= List of Estonian films since 1991 =

A list of films made in the Republic of Estonia since 1991: For a list of Estonian films released prior to 1991, see List of Estonian films.

== 1990s ==
Title	English Release Title	Director	Cast	Genre	Notes
1991
Noorelt õpitud	The Sunny Kids	Jüri Sillart	Sulev Luik, Tõnu Kark, Erki Veling, Tiina Vilu, Ülle Kaljuste	Drama	
Rahu tänav	Peace Street	Roman Baskin	Mikk Mikiver, Katrin Karisma, Lauri Vihman, Kaljo Kiisk, Elisabet Tamm	Drama	
Rist	Cross	Lauri Aaspõllu	Ain Lutsepp, Hendrik Toompere Jr., Arvo Kukumägi, Enn Nõmmik, Peeter Sauter	Drama	
Surmatants	The Dance of Death	Tõnu Virve	Evald Hermaküla, Mikk Mikiver, Sulev Luik, Peeter Volkonski, Margus Varusk, Kaie Mihkelson, Enn Kraam, Kärt Tomingas, Raivo Trass, Piret Kalda, Andrus Vaarik, Andres Dvinjaninov, Mart Nurk, Heino Mandri, Rudolf Allabert, Mati Klooren, Ain Lutsepp, Jüri Järvet, Kalju Orro, Aarne Üksküla, Hendrik Toompere Jr., Jüri Karindi, Aleksander Eelmaa, Guido Kangur, Maria Avdjuško, Tõnu Aav, Egon Nuter	Historical Drama	
Vana mees tahab koju	The Old Man Wants to Go Home (An Old Man is Missing His Home)	Tõnis Kask	Kaljo Kiisk, Raivo Trass, Kaie Mihkelson, Hendrik Toompere Jr., Angelina Semjonova, Mari Lill, Mihkel Smeljanski, Ülle Ulla	Drama	
1992
Armastuse lahinguväljad	Battlefields of Love	Valentin Kuik	Carmen Mikiver, Hendrik Toompere Jr., Vello Janson, Rein Malmsten	Drama	
Balti armastuslood	The Baltic Love	Peeter Urbla	Andres Noormets, Carmen Mikiver, Madis Kalmet	Drama	
Daam autos	The Lady in the Car	Peeter Urbla	Epp Eespäev, Toomas Hussar, Lembit Ulfsak	Crime Drama	
Hotell E	Hotel E	Priit Pärn		Animated Feature Film	
Lammas all paremas nurgas	The Secret Lamb	Lembit Ulfsak	Tõnu Kark, Margus Alver, Kaur Sinissaar, Dan Põldroos, Ain Lutsepp, Kalju Orro, Aarne Üksküla, Maria Klenskaja, Nele Ruubel, Ülle Kaljuste, Helene Vannari, Anu Lamp, Piret Kalda, Silvia Laidla	Family Comedy	
Luukas		Tõnu Virve	Ita Ever, Jüri Järvet, Ain Lutsepp	Drama	
Need vanad armastuskirjad	Those Old Love Letters	Mati Põldre	Rain Simmul, Liis Tappo, Ülle Kaljuste, Marika Korolev, Kärt Tomingas, Lii Tedre, Marina Levtova, Jaan Rekkor, Tõnu Kilgas, Andres Lepik, Vladimir Laptev, Sulev Teppart, Guido Kangur	Biography	Film about composer Raimond Valgre
Tule tagasi, Lumumba	Come Back, Lumumba	Aare Tilk	Ants Ander, Ahto Heiden, Kadri Kalm, Arvo Kukumägi, Anu Lamp, Paul Poom, Ojar Rouk, Lembit Ulfsak	Drama	
Võlausaldajad	Creditors	Jaan Kolberg	Terje Pennie, Sulev Luik, Arvo Kukumägi	Drama	
1993
In Paradisum		Sulev Keedus	Documentary		Neitsi Maali award
Tallinn pimeduses	Darkness in Tallinn (also known as City Unplugged)	Ilkka Järvi-Laturi	Ivo Uukkivi, Elina Aasa, Milena Gulbe, Jüri Järvet, Kristel Kärner, Kadri Kilvet, Salme Poopuu, Andres Raag, Enn Klooren, Ulvi Kreitsmann, Väino Laes, Kristel Leesmend, Anna-Liisa Lehtimetsä, Leida Paju, Külli Palmsaar, Kerstin Raidma, Salme Reek, Garmen Tabor	Crime Drama	
Suflöör	The Prompter	Kaljo Kiisk	Epp Eespäev, Mark Johanson, Marko Matvere, Elmo Nüganen, Andrus Vaarik	Drama	
1994
Ameerika mäed	Roller-Coaster	Peeter Simm	Maria Avdjuško, Herardo Contreras, Tõnu Kark, Kaljo Kiisk, Jüri Krjukov, Kärt Kross, Andres Lepik, Tarmo Männard, Emil Rutiku, Heiko Sööt, Dajan Ahmet	Crime Drama	
Jüri Rumm		Jaan Kolberg	Hannes Kaljujärv, Marian Wolf, Merle Palmiste, Katariina Unt, Kaljo Kiisk, Rein Oja, Peeter Kard, Dan Põldroos, Marko Matvere, Tõnu Kark, Väino Laes, Aarne Üksküla, Mari Lill, Ada Lundver, Ines Aru, Andrus Vaarik, Kaarel Kilvet, Jüri Aarma, Juhan Saar, Luule Komissarov, Egon Nuter, Toomas Suuman, Robert Gutman, Alvar Sammal, Ago Roo, Ivo Uukkivi, Mait Malmsten, Kristel Leesmend	Historical Drama, Adventure	
Saatana pisar	Tear of the Prince of Darkness	Marek Piestrak		Horror	Poland; Estonia
Tulivesi	The Firewater	Hardi Volmer	Epp Eespäev, Erik Ruus, Jaan Tätte, Ain Lutsepp, Lembit Ulfsak, Tõnu Kark, Raivo Mets, Eduard Toman, Marko Matvere, Eve Kivi, Arvo Kukumägi	Crime Drama	
1995
Ma olen väsinud vihkamast	Too Tired to Hate	Hannes Lintrop & Renita Lintrop	Jarl Karjatse, Martin Algus, Helen Kadastik, Marek Pavlov, Kari Kuulman, Tanel Saar, Renee Kaljula, Ivar Kütsen, Madis Mõttus, Aivar Kuusk, Indrek Kruusmets, Tarvo Räni, Meelis Sarv, Sven Pert, Kaljo Kiisk, Anu Lamp, Andres Noormets, Mati Klooren, Rein Oja, Kalju Kivi, Tõnu Mikk, Ahto Heiden, Hannes Hansma, Kadri Kalvi, Madis Nurmse	Drama	
1996
Elasime Eestile	We Lived for Estonia	Andres Sööt		Documentary	
Griša		Jüri Sillart		Documentary	Neitsi Maali award
1997
Isa, poeg ja püha Toorum	Father, Son and Holy Torum	Mark Soosaar		Documentary	Neitsi Maali award
Minu Leninid	All My Lenins	Hardi Volmer	Üllar Saaremäe, Viktor Sukhorukov, Andrus Vaarik, Indrek Taalmaa, Helene Vannari, Janne Sevtsenko, Peeter Volkonski, Peeter Laurits, Lauri Nebel, Jüri Järvet Jr., Eero Spriit, Elektra, Epp Eespäev, Jaan Rekkor, Omar Volmer, Linnar Priimägi, Peeter Kard, Peeter Jakobi, Sulev Luik, Gunnar Kilgas, Hannes Võrno, Raivo Rüütel, Egon Nuter, Aarne Üksküla, Ferdinand Kala, Arvo Kukumägi, Peeter Kaljumäe, Tõnu Aav, Hardi Volmer, Dajan Ahmet, Ilmar Raag	Historical Comedy	
1998
Georgica		Sulev Keedus	Evald Aavik, Mait Merekülski, Ülle Toming, Rein Oja, Kalle Käesel, Kersti Heinloo, Jane Övel, Maarika Klesman, Maret Elbing, Medni Pilve, Reino Lepp, Svetlana Metsvaht, Lily Sepping, Marika Seen, Andres Ait, Märt Kaseorg, Merlis Nõgene, Katri Altmäe	Drama	
Kallis härra Q	Dear Mister Moon	Rao Heidmets	Gabriele Guardado, Kerti Viilas, Herta Elviste, Laine Mägi, Diana Klas, Peeter Volkonski, Mart Sander, Anne Paluver, Väino Laes, Tarmo Männard, Marek Kalmus, Ivo Uukkivi, Jaanus Nõgisto, Enn Kraam, Evi Rauer	Family Comedy	
Millennium		Tõnu Trubetsky		indie punk film	
1999
Esteetilistel põhjustel	For Aesthetic Reasons	Marko Raat		Documentary	Neitsi Maali award
Kass kukub käppadele	Happy Landing	Peter Herzog, Jaak Kilmi, Rainer Sarnet	René Reinumägi, Kaia Skoblov, Regina Razuma, Arvo Kukumägi, Peeter Volkonski, Ingomar Vihmar, Raivo Trass, Hendrik Toompere Jr., Gita Kalmet, Thea Luik, Maarja Jakobson, Taavi Eelmaa, Signe Lomp, Raine Loo, Aleksander Eelmaa	Adventure	
Lurjus	An Affair of Honour	Valentin Kuik	Taavi Eelmaa, Elina Reinold, Andres Puustusmaa, Arvo Kukumägi, Vello Janson, Ago Roo, Ene Järvis, Leida Rammo, Tõnis Mägi, Kirsti Timmer	Drama	
Niisugused kolm lugu	Three Stories	Ervin Õunapuu, Askolds Saulītis, Peeter Simm		Drama	
Ristumine peateega	The Highway Crossing	Arko Okk	Andrus Vaarik, Piret Kalda, Jaan Tätte, Emil Urbel, Andres Tarand	Drama	

== 2000s ==
Title	English Title	Director	Cast	Genre	Notes
2001
Head käed (Estonian); Labās rokas (Latvian)	Good Hands	Peeter Simm	Rēzija Kalniņa, Lembit Ulfsak, Tõnu Kark, Tiit Sukk, Atis Tenbergs, Maija Apine, Leonarda Kļaviņa, Gert Raudsep, Regnārs Vaivars, Lauri Nebel, Aleksander Okunev Aleksander Okunev, Kristel Elling, Laine Mägi, Margus Prangel, Janek Joost	Comedy-Drama	Estonia; Latvia
Karu süda	The Heart of the Bear	Arvo Iho	Rain Simmul, Dinara Drukarova, Ilyana Pavlova, Külli Teetamm, Lembit Ulfsak, Nail Chaikhoutdinov, Arvo Kukumägi, Galina Bokashevskaya	Drama	Estonia; Czech Republic; Germany; Russia; Entered into the 24th Moscow International Film Festival
Lepatriinude jõulud	Ladybirds' Christmas	Heiki Ernits, Janno Põldma	Lembit Ulfsak, Anu Lamp, Andero Ermel, Kaljo Kiisk, Peeter Oja, Marko Matvere, Jan Uuspõld, Elina Reinold, Margus Tabor, Garmen Tabor, Johanna Ulfsak	Animated Feature Film	
Ma armastan Ameerikat	I Love America	Tõnu Trubetsky		indie punk film	
Peeter		Jüri Sillart		Documentary	Neitsi Maali award
2002
Agent Sinikael	Agent Wild Duck	Marko Raat	Mait Malmsten, Kersti Heinloo, Florian Feigl, Andrus Vaarik, Kaido Veermäe, Mihkel Smeljanski, Enn Klooren, Viire Valdma	Political thriller	Coproduction; Estonia; Denmark
Nimed marmortahvlil	Names in Marble	Elmo Nüganen	Priit Võigemast, Indrek Sammul, Hele Kõre, Alo Kõrve, Anti Reinthal, Ott Sepp, Mart Toome, Peter Franzén, Martin Veinmann	Drama	
2003
Elav jõud		Jaak Kilmi, Andres Maimik		Documentary	Neitsi Maali award
Kohtumine võõras linnas (or Broidit)	Brothers	Esa Illi		Drama	Coproduction; Estonia; Finland
Somnambuul	Somnambulance	Sulev Keedus	Katariina Unt, Evald Aavik, Ivo Uukkivi, Jan Uuspõld	Drama	
Vanad ja kobedad saavad jalad alla	Made in Estonia	Rando Pettai	Henrik Normann, Madis Milling, Piret Laurimaa, Robert Gutman, Viire Valdma, Marko Matvere, Jan Uuspõld, Sepo Seeman, Peeter Oja, Marika Vaarik, Enn Reitel, Egon Nuter, Algis Ramanauskas, Hilje Murel, Kaili Närep	Comedy	
2004
Frank & Wendy	Frank & Wendy	Priit Tender, Ülo Pikkov	Peeter Oja, Jan Uuspõld, Janne Shevtshenko, Andrus Vaarik, Anne Reemann, Eduard Toman, Tarmo Männard	Animated Feature Film	
Jüri – see mulk ehk mis tuul müürile ...		Enn Säde		Documentary	
Sigade revolutsioon	Revolution of Pigs	Jaak Kilmi, Rene Reinumägi	Jass Seljamaa, Evelin Kuusik, Lilian Alto, Uku Uusberg, Vadim Albrant, Mikk Tammepõld, Merle Liivak, Merli Rosar, Tarvo Kaspar Toome, Martin Mill, Üllar Saaremäe	Comedy	Entered into the 26th Moscow International Film Festival
Sügis Ida-Euroopas	The Autumn in Eastern Europe	Tõnu Trubetsky		indie punk film	
Täna öösel me ei maga	Set Point	Ilmar Taska	Carmen Kass, Priit Võigemast, Maria Avdjuško, Peter Franzén, Veikko Täär, Helen Mahmastol, Ivo Uukkivi, Oleg Rogatchov	Drama	
Vali kord		Andres Maimik		Documentary	
Veepomm paksule kõutsile	Waterbomb for the Fat Tomcat	Varis Brasla		Family Film	Latvia; Estonia
2005
August 1991	August 1991	Ilmar Raag	Tanel Ingi, Hilje Murel, Andres Mähar, Hele Kõre, Tõnu Oja, Peeter Tammearu, Andres Noormets, Hendrik Toompere Jr., Gert Raudsep, Tiina Mälberg, Rain Simmul, Tiit Palu, Hans Kaldoja, Aksel Lemberg, Indrek Taalmaa	Historical Drama	
Hämarik ja Koit	Dusk and Dawn	Tarmo Rajaleid		Documentary	
Libahundi needus	The Curse of a Werewolf	Rainer Sarnet	Katariina Lauk, Janek Joost, Raine Loo, Raivo Adlas, René Reinumägi, Tiit Lilleorg, Kersti Kreismann, Merle Palmiste, Viire Valdma, Marje Metsur, Lembit Eelmäe, Kersti Heinloo, Mait Malmsten, Elina Reinold, Hannes Kaljujärv	Comedy-Drama-Mystery	
Kohtumine tundmatuga	Touched by the Unknown	Jaak Kilmi	Tiit Sukk, Raivo E. Tamm, Peeter Oja, Ülle Kaljuste, Maria Avdjuško, Rainer Rehkli, Heino Torga, Andrus Vaarik, Kalju Orro, Robert Gutman, Anne Paluver, Hendrik Toompere Jr., Ines Aru, Lembit Ulfsak, Ingrid Tõniste	Comedy-Drama-Fantasy	
Kõrini!	Fed Up!	Peeter Simm	Heio von Stetten, Rasmus Kaljujärv, Maarja Jakobson	Comedy-Drama	Estonia; Germany
Malev	Men at Arms	Kaaren Kaer	Ott Sepp, Mirtel Pohla, Argo Aadli, Üllar Saaremäe, Mait Malmsten, Ain Mäeots, Märt Avandi, Dajan Ahmet	Comedy	
Mees animatsioonist	Pärnography	Hardi Volmer	Priit Pärn	Documentary	
Röövlirahnu Martin	Mat the Cat	René Vilbre	Madis Ollikainen, Kadi Sink, Andry Zhagars, Ott Sepp, Piret Kalda, Maria Avdjuško, Jaan Rekkor, Lembit Ulfsak, Sander Valdma, Tanel Pihlak, Rasmus Lepp, Maris Reintal, Linda Randoja	Family-Comedy-Fantasy	
Sagedused	Frequencies	Priit Pääsuke	Rasmus Kaljujärv, Aarne Üksküla, Riina Maidre, Margus Prangel, Kristjan Sarv, Kaia Skoblov, Jaanis Valk, Mait Järve	Drama Short	
Stiilipidu	Shop of Dreams	Peeter Urbla	Maarja Jakobson, Anne Reemann, Evelin Pang, Karol Kuntsel, Meelis Rämmeld, Madis Kalmet, Marika Vaarik, Hannes Prikk, Toomas Urb, Hannes Kaljujärv, Herardo Contreras, Andrus Joala, Raivo E. Tamm, Lauri Kink, Rita Raave, Aarne Soro, Mart Toome	Comedy-Drama	Estonia; Finland
Vanameeste paradiis	Paradise for Old Men	Ove Musting	Tõnu Aav, Aleksander Eelmaa, Tõnu Oja, Ants Ander, Genka, Tiit Lilleorg, Katrin Valkna	Drama Short	
2006
Igavese armastuse sõdalane	Jade Warrior	AJ Annila			Finland; China; Estonia; Netherlands
Koer, lennuk ja laulupidu	The Hostage	Laila Pakalniņa			Latvia; Estonia
Hinged eksiteel	Strayed Souls	Joe Reith	Silvia Jaksman, Laura Jürimäe, Eva Maria Männik, Maarja Männik, Ingrid Morel, Jass Seljamaa, Anneliis Tapfer	Drama	Estonia; United States
Kuldrannake	Golden Beach	Jüri Sillart	Taavi Eelmaa, Marika Korolev, Mait Malmsten, Ülle Lichtfeldt, Hendrik Toompere Jr., Maria Avdjuško, Veikko Täär, Sepo Seeman, Merle Palmiste, Margus Prangel, Tiit Sukk	Drama-Thriller	
Leiutajateküla Lotte	Lotte from Gadgetville	Heiki Ernits, Janno Põldma	Evelin Pang, Andero Ermel, Argo Aadli, Lembit Ulfsak, Garmen Tabor, Marko Matvere, Piret Kalda, Peeter Oja, Harriet Toompere, Elina Reinold, Mait Malmsten, Margus Tabor, Aarne Üksküla, Roman Baskin	Animated	Estonia; Latvia
Meeletu	Mindless	Elmo Nüganen	Rain Simmul, Mari-Liis Lill, Anne Reemann, Indrek Taalmaa, Aivar Tommingas, Peeter Tammearu, Kalju Orro, Helene Vannari, Arvo Raimo, Rein Oja, Taavi Eelmaa, Kalju Komissarov, Märt Avandi, Kristel Elling, Sulev Teppart	Comedy-Drama	
Müümise kunst	The Art of Selling	Jaak Kilmi, Andres Maimik		Documentary	
New York		Tõnu Trubetsky		indie punk film	
Tulnukas ehk Valdise pääsemine 11 osas	The Alien or Valdis' Escape in 11 Parts	Rasmus Merivoo	Märt Avandi, Ott Sepp, Vallo Kirs, Uku Uusberg, Ago Anderson, Indrek Taalmaa, Indrek Ojari, Merle Jääger, Kristjan Sarv	Comedy Short	
Ruudi	Ruudi	Katrin Laur	Paul Oskar Soe, Juta Altmets, Tarvo Langeberg, Marvo Langeberg, Mairo Ainsar, Guido Kangur, Aarne Mägi, Katariina Lauk, Aleksander Eelmaa, Ülle Kaljuste, Ines Aru, Jan Uuspõld, Dan Põldroos, Indrek Taalmaa, Janek Joost	Comedy-Family-Fantasy	Estonia; Finland; Germany
Sinimäed	The Blue Hills	Raimo Jõerand	Mait Malmsten, Taavi Teplenkov	Documentary	
The Singing Revolution		James Tusty, Maureen Castle Tusty		Documentary about the Singing Revolution	United States; Estonia
Sõprus-Druzhba	Friendship	Anu Pennanen	Ilya Alpatov, Erich Hartvich, Madis Mäeorg, Sille Paas, Ronald Pelin, Häli Ann Reintam, Olena Romanjuk, Mari Tammesalu, Steven Vihalemm	Drama short	Shown in truncated format as part of art exhibitions in Finland and Spain.
Tabamata ime	The Elusive Miracle	Jaak Kilmi, Arbo Tammiksaar	Taavi Eelmaa, Liina Vahtrik, Mari Abel, Jaak Allik, Maarja Jakobson, Liina Jaska, Madis Kolk, Erki Laur, Andres Maimik, Mait Malmsten, Marko Mägi, Siim Nestor, Merle Palmiste, Terje Pennie, Ilmar Raag	Comedy-Drama	
Tühirand	Empty	Veiko Õunpuu	Rain Tolk, Taavi Eelmaa, Juhan Ulfsak, Maarja Jakobson	Drama	
Vana daami visiit	The Visit of the Old Lady	Roman Baskin	Ita Ever, Aarne Üksküla, Raivo Trass, Aleksander Eelmaa, Ain Lutsepp, Indrek Taalmaa, Ester Pajusoo, Leila Säälik, Eino Baskin	Comedy-Drama	
2007
Georg	Georg	Peeter Simm	Marko Matvere, Anastasiya Makeeva, Renārs Kaupers, Tõnu Kark, Elle Kull, Mirtel Pohla, Karin Touart, Rein Oja, Aleksander Okunev, Sergei Fetissov, Bert Raudsep, Jevgeni Gaitsuk, Indrek Taalmaa, Jassi Zahharov, Ülle Kaljuste	Historical Drama	Estonia; Russia; Finland; Biography of Estonian singer Georg Ots
Jan Uuspõld läheb Tartusse	186 Kilometres	Andres Maimik, Rain Tolk	Jan Uuspõld, Allar Remma, Veke Ahtiainen, Toomas Kirss, Ott Sepp, Madis Rästas, Terje Kissa, Arno Saar, Tõnu Kilgas, Paul Hendrik Maimik, Peeter Volkonski	Comedy-Drama	
Jonathan Austraaliast	Jonathan from Australia	Sulev Keedus		Documentary	
Kinnunen	Kinnunen	Andri Luup	Sesa Lehto, Maria Peterson, Ott Aardam, Ksenja Agarkova, Aleksander Eelmaa, Eva Eensaar-Tootsen, Alisa Jakobi, Aleksander Katsai, Jarkko Lahti, Markus Luik, Hilje Murel, Jarkko Nyman, Ester Pajusoo, Matti Ristinen, Tarmo Song	Comedy-Drama-Romance	
Klass	The Class	Ilmar Raag	Vallo Kirs, Pärt Uusberg, Lauri Pedaja, Paula Solvak, Mikk Mägi, Riina Ries, Joonas Paas, Triin Tenso, Kadi Metsla, Laine Mägi, Saara Kadak	Drama	
Kuhu põgenevad hinged	Where Souls Go	Rainer Sarnet	Ragne Veensalu, Lenna Kuurmaa, Andres Lõo, Viire Valdma, Ivo Uukkivi, Ene Rämmeld, Tiit Lilleorg, Taavi Eelmaa, Piret Kalda, Kaie Mihkelson, Argo Aadli, Lauri Lagle	Drama	
Magnus	Magnus	Kadri Kõusaar	Kristjan Kasearu, Merle Jääger, Mart Laisk, Anu Aaremäe, Piret Avila, Hellar Bergmann, Boris Burachinski, Ivo Goldi, Heiko Hiller, Aapo Ilves, Kaisa Karu, Bille Neeve, Kristiina Nurmis, Marianne Ostrat	Drama	Estonia; United Kingdom
Mis iganes, Aleksander!	Whatever, Aleksander!	Maiju Ingman	Jaak Prints, Arvo Kukumägi, Ao Peep, Kaie Mihkelson, Arvo Raimo, Bert Raudsep, Ott Sepp, Mirtel Pohla, Riina Maidre, Ragnar Neljandi, Rudolf Allabert, Rednar Annus, Robert Mölder, Annika Tamme	Comedy	
Nuga	Knife	Marko Raat	Mait Malmsten, Kersti Heinloo, Britta Vahur, Elle Kull, Kädi Metsoja, Gert Raudsep	Drama	
Saatuse piraadid	Pirates of Destiny	Tõnu Trubetsky		indie punk film	
Sügisball	Autumn Ball	Veiko Õunpuu	Rain Tolk, Taavi Eelmaa, Juhan Ulfsak, Sulevi Peltola, Tiina Tauraite, Maarja Jakobson, Mirtel Pohla, Iris Persson, Paul Laasik, Laine Mägi	Drama	
Võõras	Detour	Dirk Hoyer	Tanel Padar, Karol Kuntsel, Maarja Mitt, Mari-Liis Lill, Hele Kõre, Karin Rask, Sven Grundberg, Gavin Kalan, Kadri Rämmeld	Crime-Drama	
Ühe metsa pojad	Sons of One Forest	Ats Surva		War Film	
2008
Detsembrikuumus	December Heat	Asko Kase	Sergo Vares, Liisi Koikson, Ain Lutsepp, Piret Kalda, Emil-Joosep Virkus, Tambet Tuisk, Mait Malmsten, Tiit Sukk, Rain Simmul	Drama	
Fritsud ja blondiinid	Nazis and Blondes	Arbo Tammiksaar	Tõnu Aav, Uldis Lieldidžs, Algimantas Masiulis	Documentary	Estonia, Latvia, Lithuania
Mina olin siin	I Was Here	René Vilbre	Rasmus Kaljujärv, Hele Kõre, Margus Prangel, Märt Avandi, Marilyn Jurman, Johannes Naan, Tambet Tuisk	Drama	Estonia; Finland
Muskusveise tagasitulek (The Return of the Musk Ox)		Riho Västrik			
Soovide puu	The Wish Tree	Liina Paakspuu	Elina Pähklimägi, Marilyn Jurman, Erki Laur, Mairit Meite, Tanel Tamm, Ago Anderson, Robert Shimuk, Hando Lukats, Marko Mägi, Akky, Raimo Pass, Elina Reinold, Andres Tabun, Lauri Kaldoja, Mario Tasane, Kristiine Truu, Anneli Rahkema, Saima Noor, Liisi Ojamaa, Marten Vets, Liina Tennosaar, Ago Soots, Kristjan Sarv, Heigo Teder, Villu Parvet, Jaak Prints, Reet Roos, Margus Grosnõi, Juss Haasma, Martin Algus	Drama	
Taarka	Taarka	Ain Mäeots	Inga Salurand, Siiri Sisask, Marje Metsur	Biography-Drama about Seto singer Hilana Taarka	First theatrically released film in the Seto dialect
Teine tulemine	The Second Coming	Tanel Toom	Rasmus Kaljujärv, Hendrik Kaljujärv, Ivo Uukkivi, Raimo Pass, Toomas Tilk	Drama Short	
Võõras	Visitor	Jukka-Pekka Valkeapää		Drama	Finland; Estonia; Germany; United Kingdom
2009
Aljoša	Alyosha	Meelis Muhu		Documentary	
Päeva lõpus	At the End of the Day	Maiju Ingman	Velvo Väli, Erik Ruus, Liisa Aibel, Toomas Suuman, Tarvo Sõmer, Eili Neuhaus, Joonas Tartu, Valdeko Korkma, Evelyn Hiie, Anneka Tamme, Marili Ott, Birgit Karus,	Drama	
Baruto – tõlkes kaduma läinud	Baruto - Lost in Translation	Artur Talvik		Documentary about Estonian sumo wrestler Baruto Kaito	
Disko ja tuumasõda	Disco and Atomic War	Jaak Kilmi		Documentary	
Püha Tõnu kiusamine	The Temptation of St. Tony	Veiko Õunpuu	Taavi Eelmaa, Ravshana Kurkova, Tiina Tauraite, Sten Ljunggren, Denis Lavant, Hendrik Toompere Jr., Katariina Lauk, Harri Kõrvits	Drama	Estonia; Sweden; Finland
Riigireetur	Traitor	Erle Veber		Documentary	
Pangarööv	Bank Robbery	Andrus Tuisk	Hannes Kaljujärv, Henri Kuus, Karin Tammaru, Marilyn Jurman, Indrek Taalmaa, Marika Barabanštšikova, Rain Simmul, Liis Lass, Andres Tabun	Drama	
Tondipoisid	Tondi Boys	Asko Kase		Documentary Short	
Vasha	Vasha	Hannu Salonen	Mehmet Kurtuluş, Mart Müürisepp, Tim Seyfi, Adnan Maral, Rein Oja, Jan Uuspõld, Malla Malmivaara, Liina Tennosaar, Merle Talvik, Evelin Võigemast, Franziska Maral, Margus Prangel, Oleg Rogatchov, Kaupo Käsik, Ada Lundver	Drama	Finland; Estonia; Ireland; Germany

== 2010s ==
Title	English Title	Director	Cast	Genre	Notes
2010
Punane elavhõbe	Red Mercury	Andres Puustusmaa	Risto Kübar, Märt Avandi, Peeter Oja	Crime-Drama, History	Estonia; Russia
Kutsar koputab kolm korda	Messenger Knocks Three Times	Elo Selirand (:et)	Marika Vaarik, Meelis Hainsoo, Erik Ruus, Kirke Selirand, Uko Ruusmaa, Markus Robam, Kersti Tombak, Liisa Aibel, Peeter Volkonski	Mystery, Fantasy	
Lumekuninganna	The Snow Queen	Marko Raat	Helena Merzin, Artur Tedremägi, Egon Nuter, Toomas Suumann, Heino Seljamaa	Romantic Drama	
Tudengimuusikal	Student Musical	Richard Meitern, Martin Liira	Adeele Sepp, Dmitri Kurilov, Kaarel Targo, Katre Luik, Merli Plink	Musical, Romance	
2011
Hing		Kullar Viimne			
Kormoranid ehk nahkpükse ei pesta	Farts of Fury	Andres Maimik, Rain Tolk	Guido Kangur, Roman Baskin, Harri Kõrvits, Jüri Vlassov, Enn Klooren, Elina Pähklimägi, Olav Osolin, Ester Pajusoo, Tanel Padar, Jaanus Rohumaa, Mikko Fritze, Lenna Kuurmaa, Piret Järvis, Tõnis Mägi, Margus Pilt	Comedy	
Üks mu sõber	A Friend of Mine	Mart Kivastik	Aarne Üksküla, Aleksander Eelmaa, Rita Raave, Harriet Toompere	Drama	
Kuku: Mina jään ellu	Kuku: I Will Survive	Andres Maimik	Arvo Kukumägi	Documentary	Portrait film about actor Arvo Kukumägi
Monoloogid 3D	Arko Okk	Ain Kaalep, Erast Parmasto, Andres Tarand, Veli Olavi Klam	Documentary	Minimalist 3D-documentary about Lennart Meri	
Rotilõks	Rattrap	Andres Puustusmaa	Mait Malmsten, Eda-Ines Etti, Aleksander Eelmaa, Ago Anderson, Tõnu Kark, Kirill Käro	Crime-Drama	
Lotte ja kuukivi saladus	Lotte and the Moonstone Secret	Heiki Ernits, Janno Põldma	Evelin Pang, Margus Tabor, Mait Malmsten, Mikk Jürjens, Tõnu Oja, Lembit Ulfsak, Priit Võigemast, Tiit Sukk, Merle Palmiste, Garmen Tabor, Elina Reinold, Tõnu Kark, Anne Reemann, Anu Lamp, Hannes Kaljujärv, Veiko Tubin	Animated	
Surnuaiavahi tütar	Graveyard Keeper's Daughter	Katrin Laur	Maria Avdjuško, Epp Eespäev, Kertu-Killu Grenman, Ülle Kaljuste, Eva Klemets, Kersti Kreismann, Katrin Järv, Arvo Kukumägi, Esther Kõiv, Anti Kobin, Ulla Reinikainen, Rain Simmul, Terje Pennie, Kristel Leesmend, Karin Tammaru, Andres Tabun, Mait Lepik, Haide Männamäe, Gregor Palmits	Drama	
Idioot	The Idiot	Rainer Sarnet	Risto Kübar, Katariina Lauk, Tambet Tuisk, Ragne Veensalu, Ain Lutsepp, Ülle Kaljuste, Tiina Tauraite, Sandra Üksküla-Uusberg, Kaido Veermäe, Juhan Ulfsak, Roman Baskin, Taavi Eelmaa	Drama	Based on the novel of The Idiot by Fyodor Dostoyevsky
Uus Maailm	The New World	Jaan Tootsen		Documentary	
Inimese mõõt	The Measure of Man	Marianne Kõrver	Kaie Kotov, Marianne Kõrver	Documentary	
Polli päevikud	The Poll Diaries	Chris Kraus	Paula Beer, Edgar Selge, Tambet Tuisk	War-Drama	Germany; Austria; Estonia
Teekond Araratile	Journey to Ararat	Riho Västrik		Documentary	
2012
Rat King	Rat King	Petri Kotwica	Max Ovaska, Julius Lavonen	Action	
Puhastus	Purge	Antti Jokinen	Laura Birn	Drama	Finland; Estonia
Eestlanna Pariisis	A Lady in Paris, Une Estonienne à Paris	Ilmar Raag	Laine Mägi, Jeanne Moreau, Patrick Pineau, François Beukelaers, Frédéric Épaud, Claudia Tagbo, Ita Ever, Helle Kuningas, Tõnu Mikiver, Helene Vannari, Ago Anderson, Piret Kalda, Roland Laos, Liis Lass	Drama	Estonia; France; Belgium
Üksik saar	Lonely Island	Peeter Simm	Lembit Ulfsak, Juhan Ulfsak, Lenna Kuurmaa	Drama	
Vasaku jala reede	Bad Hair Friday	Andres Kõpper, Arun Tamm	Kirke Algma, Martin Algus, Sten Karpov, Katri Kitsing, Ott Lepland, Priit Loog, Martin Mill, Mart Müürisepp, Mattias Naan, Eva Pajus, Lauri Pedaja, Salme Poopuu	Crime-Comedy	
Kõik muusikud on kaabakad	All Musicians are Bastards	Heleri Saarik	Riina Maidre, Nero Urke, Jarek Kasar, Helina Risti, Lotte Jürjendal, Mihkel Kõrvits, Jelena Skulskaja, Toomas Jürgenstein, Kristel Leesmend, Kaisa Mallene, Raivo Trass, Kaido Veermäe, Andres Lõo, Jaanika Arum	Musical-Drama	
Seenelkäik	Mushrooming	Toomas Hussar	Hendrik Toompere Jr. Jr., Hilje Murel, Elina Reinold, Üllar Saaremäe, Raivo E. Tamm, Juhan Ulfsak, Ott Sepp, Volli Käro, Ülle Kaljuste, Elmo Nüganen, Mari-Liis Lill, Raimo Pass, Indrek Tischler, Janek Tischler, Emil Rutiku, Hannes Võrno	Comedy	
Sinine Kõrb		Ruti Murusalu		Documentary	about ballet dancer Kaie Kõrb
Varesesaare venelased		Sulev Keedus		Documentary	
2013
Elavad pildid	Living Images	Hardi Volmer	Ita Ever, Aarne Üksküla, Anu Lamp, Tõnu Oja	Historical Drama	
Free Range: Ballaad maailma heakskiitmisest	Free Range	Veiko Õunpuu	Lauri Lagle, Jaanika Arum, Laura Peterson, Peeter Volkonski, Roman Baskin, Rita Raave, Meelis Rämmeld	Drama	Best Actor (Lagle), 22nd Vilnius International Film Festival
Kertu	Kertu	Ilmar Raag	Mait Malmsten, Ursula Ratasepp, Peeter Tammearu, Külliki Saldre	Romantic Drama	
Kohtumõistja	The Arbiter	Kadri Kõusaar	Lee Ingleby, Lina Leandersson, Andrea Lowe, Sofia Berg-Böhm	Drama	In English
Mandariinid	Tangerines	Zaza Urushadze	Lembit Ulfsak, Giorgi Nakashidze, Elmo Nüganen, Mikheil Meskhi	Drama	Estonia; Georgia
Väikelinna detektiivid ja Valge Daami saladus	Kid Detectives and the Secret of the White Lady	René Vilbre	Mikk Kaasik, Mariann Vilbre, Miikael Ainla, Liisa Koppel, Lembit Ulfsak, Tambet Tuisk, Priit Võigemast, Hilje Murel, Jaan Rekkor, Märt Pius, Kärt Tammjärv, Ülle Kaljuste - Merle Palmiste	Drama	Baltic Entertainment Company, Eesti Rahvusringhääling
2014
Risttuules	In the Crosswind	Martti Helde	Einar Hillep, Ingrid Isotamm, Laura Peterson, Mirt Preegel, Tarmo Song	Drama	Allfilm
Nullpunkt	Zero Point	Mihkel Ulk	Märt Pius, Saara Kadak, Tambet Tuisk, Mari Abel, Christopher Rajaveer, Liis Lindmaa, Reimo Sagor, Taavi Teplenkov, Brigitte Susanne Hunt, Henrik Kalmet, Külliki Saldre, Kärt Tomingas, Kärt Tammjärv, Raimo Pass, Ingmar Jõela, Aleksander Eeri Laupmaa,	Drama	
Maastik mitme kuuga	Landscape with Many Moons	Jaan Toomik	Hendrik Toompere Jr., Jaanika Juhanson, Maria Avdjuško, Garmen Tabor, Keiro Mägi, Elaan (Alar Sudak), Antti Reini, Raimo Pass, Sergei Furmanjuk, Ants Nukki, Meelis Puusepp, Aksel Kuum, Jaan Laugamõts, Jüri Ojaver, Eliko Melb	Drama	
Kirsitubakas	Cherry Tobacco	Andres Maimik, Katrin Maimik	Maarja Jakobson, Tiina Kadarpik, Andres Kütt, Viiu Maimik, Getter Meresmaa, Maris Nõlvak, Gert Raudsep, Anne Reemann, Aap Salumets	Romantic Drama	Kuukulgur Film
Kuidas ma Aafrikat päästsin	How I Saved Arica	Kullar Viimne		Documentary	
Prügi mahapanek keelatud!	Littering Prohibited!	Jaak Kilmi		Documentary Short	
2015
1944	1944	Elmo Nüganen	Marko Leht, Märt Pius, Pääru Oja, Maiken Schmidt, Ivo Uukkivi, Magnús Mariuson, Kaspar Velberg, Hendrik Toompere Jr. Jr., Mait Malmsten, Kristjan Üksküla, Priit Pius, Ain Mäeots, Karl-Andreas Kalmet, Anne Reemann, Tõnu Oja, Priit Loog, Andero Ermel, Jaak Prints	War Drama	
Must alpinist	Ghost Mountaineer	Urmas Eero Liiv	Priit Pius, Vadim Andreev, Veiko Porkanen, Hanna Martinson, Reimo Sagor, Liis Lass	Thriller	
Vehkleja	The Fencer	Klaus Härö	Märt Avandi, Lembit Ulfsak, Kirill Käro, Liisa Koppel, Alina Karmazina, Ursula Ratasepp, Kaarle Aho, Kai Nordberg, Maria Klenskaja, Joonas Koff, Tõnu Oja, Piret Kalda, Ahti Puudersell, Hendrik Toompere Jr., Andres Lepik	Historic Drama	
Roukli		Veiko Õunpuu	Taavi Eelmaa, Eva Klemets, Lauri Lagle, Mirtel Pohla, Peeter Raudsepp, Meelis Rämmeld, Tambet Tuisk, Juhan Ulfsak	Drama	
Supilinna Salaselts	The Secret Society of Souptown	Margus Paju		Family, Adventure	
2016
Mother	Ema	Kadri Kõusaar	Tiina Mälberg, Andres Tabun, Andres Noormets, Siim Maaten, Jaak Prints, Rea Lest, Jaan Pehk, Getter Meresmaa, Katrin Kalma, Marin Mägi, Margus Mikomägi, Liis Laigna, Märten Matsu	Drama	
Polaarpoiss	The Polar Boy	Anu Aun	Roland Laos, Jaanika Arum, Jörgen Liik, Kaspar Velberg, Katariina Unt, Rein Oja, Eric Simonin, Ülle Kaljuste, Andrus Vaarik, Mirtel Pohla, Indrek Sammul, Henrik Kalmet, Joosep Jürgenson, Jaan Rekkor, Ene Järvis, Raivo Adlas, Ago Anderson, Andres Mähar, Rain Simmul, Ivo Uukkivi, Meelis Rämmeld, Hendrik Toompere Jr., Kersti Heinloo, Mart Müürisepp, Mattias Naan, Eldur Verš, Jaanus Tepomees, Liisa Saaremäel, Ester Kuntu, Markus Habakukk, Karl Laumets, Kristiine Eliise Kadakas	Drama	LuxFilm
Päevad, mis ajasid segadusse	The Days That Confused	Triin Ruumet	Hendrik Toompere Jr. Jr., Jaanika Arum, Juhan Ulfsak, Taavi Eelmaa, Klaudia Tiitsmaa,	Comedy-Drama	
Klassikokkutulek	Class Reunion	René Vilbre	Mait Malmsten, G-Enka, Ago Anderson, Maarja Jakobson, Franz Malmsten, Sofia Fe Soe, Märt Pius, Arvi Mägi, Gerli Rosenfeld, Maris Kõrvits, Kadri Rämmeld, Mart Müürisepp, Kristjan Lüüs, Britta Soll, Nikolai Bentsler, Kristiina-Hortensia Port, Karin Rask, Martin Algus	Comedy	
Luuraja ja luuletaja	The Spy and the Poet	Toomas Hussar	Jan Uuspõld, Rain Tolk, Lana Vatsel, Mari Abel, Peeter Jalakas, Ivo Uukkivi, Pääru Oja, Priit Võigemast, Nikolai Bentsler, Ruslan Izmailov, Maksim Demidov, Oleg Rogatchov, Tambet Tuisk, Tõnu Oja, Tiina Tauraite, Kersti Tombak, Mait Joorits, Loore Martma, Argo Aadli, Margus Mikomägi, Kairi Prints, Jarl Karjatse, Martin Algus, Üllar Vaserik, Virag Markus, Sandra Ashilevi	Drama-Thriller	
Õnn tuleb magades	When You Least Expect It	Mart Kivastik	Katariina Unt, Ivo Uukkivi, Tiit Sukk, Katrin Pärn	Comedy-Drama	
Perekonnavaled	Family Lies	Valentin Kuik, Manfred Vainokivi	Tambet Tuisk, Eva Koldits, Roman Baskin, Ülle Kaljuste, Tõnu Kark, Jaanika Arum, Anu Lamp, Laine Mägi, Ago Anderson, Alo Kõrve, Inga Salurand, Sulev Teppart, Paul Laasik, Hilje Murel, Mati Põldre	Drama	
Teesklejad	Pretenders	Vallo Toomla	Mirtel Pohla, Priit Võigemast, Mari Abel, Meelis Rämmeld, Andres Lepik, Laine Mägi	Drama-Thriller	
Ameerika suvi	Chasing Ponies	Rain Rannu	Indrek Arula, Kerttu Karon, Wyatt Kelly, Einar Kuusk, Samantha Laurenti, Jarmo Murumaa, Helena Pruuli, Valerie Quade, Kristo Viiding	Comedy-Drama	
2017
November	November	Rainer Sarnet	Rea Lest, Jörgen Liik, Arvo Kukumägi, Katariina Unt, Taavi Eelmaa, Jaan Tooming	Fantasy-Drama	
Keti lõpp	The End of the Chain	Priit Pääsuke	Maiken Schmidt, Hendrik Toompere Jr. Jr., Tiit Lilleorg, Henrik Kalmet	Drama	
Sangarid	The Dissidents	Jaak Kilmi	Märt Pius, Karl-Andreas Kalmet, Veiko Porkanen, Esko Salminen, Julia Berngardt, Tõnu Kark	Comedy	
Svingerid	Swingers	Andrejs Ekis	Jan Uuspõld, Elina Purde, Ago Anderson, Elina Reinold, Ivo Uukkivi	Comedy	
Mehetapja / Süütu / Vari	The Manslayer / The Virgin / The Shadow	Sulev Keedus	Rea Lest, Evald Aavik, Andrus Albrecht, Kersti Heinloo, Peeter Jakobi, Guido Kangur, Piret Krumm, Elle Kull, Andres Lepik, Jörgen Liik, Mari Lill, Ain Lutsepp	Historical Drama	
Nõukogude hipid	Soviet Hippies	Terje Toomistu	Sri Rama Michael Tamm	Documentary	Estonia; Germany; Finland
Minu näoga onu	The Man Who Looks Like Me	Andres Maimik, Katrin Maimik	Roman Baskin, Tõnis Kahu, Jarek Kasar, Eve Kivi, Carmen Mikiver, Maarja Mitt, Siim Nestor, Koit Raudsepp, Raul Saaremets, Rain Tolk, Ruben Tolk, Evelin Võigemast	Comedy-Drama	
2018
Seltsimees laps	The Little Comrade	Moonika Siimets	Helena Maria Reisner, Tambet Tuisk, Eva Koldits, Juhan Ulfsak, Liina Vahtrik, Lembit Peterson, Liisa Pulk, Pille Pürg	Historical Drama	
Portugal		Lauri Lagle	Mirtel Pohla, Margus Prangel, Jarmo Reha, Taavi Eelmaa, Anne Türnpu	Drama	
Klassikokkutulek 2: Pulmad ja matused	Class Reunion 2: A Wedding and a Funeral	René Vilbre	Mait Malmsten, Ago Anderson, G-Enka	Comedy	
Võta või jäta	Take It or Leave It	Liina Triškina-Vanhatalo	Epp Eespäev, Reimo Sagor, Andres Mähar, Liis Lass, Adeele Sepp, Egon Nuter, Viire Valdma, Indrek Ojari, Kristjan Lüüs, Terje Pennie	Drama	
Tuliliilia	Fire Lily	Maria Avdjuško	Ingrid Isotamm, Johann Urb, Eva Eensaar, Rasmus Kallas, Epp Eespäev, Adele Taska, Kristjan Sarv, Raivo Trass, Liisa Pulk, Bert Raudsep, Kristo Viiding, Elina Reinold	Mystery-Drama	
Eia jõulud Tondikakul	Eia's Christmas Mission	Anu Aun	Paula Rits, Siim Oskar Ots, Liis Lemsalu, Jaan Rekkor, Juhan Ulfsak, Märt Pius, Priit Pius, Maria Annus, Robert Annus, Mirtel Pohla, Anne Reemann, Meelis Rämmeld, Tambet Tuisk, Priit Võigemast	Family	
Põrgu Jaan	The Riddle of Jaan Niemand	Kaur Kokk	Meelis Rämmeld, Pääru Oja, Aleksander Eelmaa, Egon Nuter, Peeter Volkonski, Andres Lepik, Villu Kangur	Drama	
Hölma all	Between Covers	Siim Tamm	Erki Laur, Jaanika Arum, Andres Lepik, Rasmus Kaljujärv, Pääru Oja	Drama-Thriller	
Tuulte tahutud maa	The Wind Sculpted Land	Joosep Matjus	Hannes Kaljujärv (narrator)	Nature documentary	
Lõbus perekond	Funny Family	Mikhail Pogosov	Saara Kadak, Aramo, Armen Arushanyan, Tigran Gevorkjan, Lauri Mäesepp, Mattias Naan, Arman Navasardyan, Merle Palmiste, Mikhail Politseymako, Elina Reinold, Vigen Stepanyan, Indrek Taalmaa, Mart Toome, Andrus Vaarik, Liina Vahtrik	Comedy	Estonia; Georgia
Õigus õnnele	The Right to Happiness	Toomas Kirss	Eva Püssa, Eva Lootsar, Guido Kangur, Carmen Mikiver, Andres Dvinyaninov, Kärt Anton, Getter Jaani, Kärt Kross-Merilo, Kersti Tombak, Andres Oja, Margus Jaanovits, Andres Mähar	Drama	
Elu Hammasratastel		Henrik Normann	Veljo Reinik, Kait Kall, Liisu Krass, Kerdo Mõlder, Anne Veski, Andres Ots, Rita Liiver, Anne Paluver, Pille Pürg, Ines Aru, Liina Tennosaar, Sepo Seeman, Aarne Soro, Kadi Põder, Kärt Kross-Merilo	Comedy	
2019
Lotte ja kadunud lohed	Lotte and the Lost Dragons	Heiki Ernits, Janno Põldma	Evelin Võigemast, Anu Lamp, Mait Malmsten, Elina Reinold, Sepo Seeman, Helmi Tulev, Harriet Toompere, Peeter Tammearu	Animated	
Johannes Pääsukese tõeline elu	Johannes Pääsuke's Real Life	Hardi Volmer	Märt Avandi, Ville Hytönen, Merle Jääger, Tõnu Kark, Ester Kuntu, Tõnu Oja, Peeter Raudsepp, Üllar Saaremäe, Ott Sepp, Ardo Ran Varres	Historical Comedy	
Mehed	Men	Gerda Kordemets	Tiit Sukk, Margus Prangel, Veikko Täär, Carmen Mikiver, Mihkel Vendel, Piret Laurimaa, Andrus Vaarik, Eva Püssa, Priit Pedajas, Tõnis Niinemets	Comedy	
Skandinaavia vaikus	Scandinavian Silence	Martti Helde	Rea Lest-Liik, Reimo Sagor	Drama	
Tõde ja õigus	Truth and Justice	Tanel Toom	Priit Loog, Priit Võigemast, Maiken Schmidt, Ester Kuntu, Simeoni Sundja, Indrek Sammul, Marika Vaarik, Ott Aardam, Loora-Eliise Kaarelson	Drama	Based on the 1926–1933 pentalogy of the same name by A. H. Tammsaare
Ott Tänak: The Movie		Tarvo Mölder	Ott Tänak	Documentary	Documentary about World Rally Championship driver Ott Tänak
Klassikokkutulek 3: Ristiisad	Class Reunion 3: Godfathers	René Vilbre	Ago Anderson, Mait Malmsten, G-Enka	Comedy	
Kohtunik	Your Honor	Andres Puustusmaa	Mait Malmsten, Märt Avandi, Sakari Kuosmanen, Sakarias Liukko, Anssi Pöyhönen, Mette Seppälä, Lee Trei	Comedy-Drama	
Vanamehe film	Old Man Film	Mikk Mägi, Oskar Lehemaa	Mikk Mägi, Jan Uuspõld, Märt Avandi, Jaagup Kreem, Mart Kukk, Indrek Ojari, Kristjan Lüüs	Animated Comedy	
Ükssarvik	Chasing Unicorns	Rain Rannu	Liisa Pulk, Henrik Kalmet, Johann Urb, Rogelio Douglas Jr., Roland Laos, Anti Kobin, Eduard Salmistu, Tõnu Hiielaid, Rain Tolk, Kristo Viiding, Riivo Anton, Vilma Luik, Carola Madis, Kaarel Nõmmik, Veljo Otsason	Comedy-Drama	
Ühemeheshow	The Chuck Band Show	Al Wallcat	Stewart Johnson, Genka, Ingrid Isotamm, Marta Laan, Janek Joost, Tómas Lemarquis, Pontus Olgrim, Andres Ots, Viido Polikarpus, Külliki Saldre	Comedy	Estonia; United States
Kiirtee põrgusse	Dora Who Came from Highway	Urmas Eero Liiv	Kersti Heinloo, Kristjan Kasearu, Franz Malmsten	Horror	
Kõhedad muinaslood	Eerie Fairy Tales	Mart Sander	Lisette Pomerants, Jekaterina Novosjolova, Kadri Rämmeld, Merle Palmiste, Toomas Kolk, Mart Sander, Ott Salla, Tanel Saar, Mart Müürisepp, Märt Koik, Liisa Linhein, Ain Mäeots, Vahur-Paul Põldma, Väino Puura, Heli Vahing	Fantasy-Horror	
Aasta täis draamat	A Year Full of Drama	Marta Pulk		Documentary	
Üksilduse allikas	The Spring of Solitude	Mart Sander	Ott Salla, Lisette Pomerants, Liisa Linhein, Heli Vahing, Ain Mäeots, Väino Puura, Oleg Lebedev-Bovolskiy, Hellar Bergmann	Fantasy-Horror	

== 2020s ==
Title	English Release Title	Director	Cast	Genre	Notes
2020
Fred Jüssi. Olemise ilu	Fred Jüssi. The Beauty of Being	Jaan Tootsen	Fred Jüssi	Documentary	
Sipsik	Raggie	Meelis Arulepp, Karsten Kiilerich	Ott Sepp, Elo-Mirt Oja, Hugo Malmsten, Ago Anderson, Nikolai Bentsler, Piret Krumm, Hilje Murel, Eliise Mööl, Merle Palmiste, Tobias Turk, Jan Uuspõld, Helene Vannari	Animated	Based on the 1962 children's book Sipsik by Eno Raud
Talve	Winter	Ergo Kuld	Rein Aedma, Tõnu Alveus, Riina Hein, Märt Koik, Harri Kõrvits, Margus Lepa, Franz Malmsten, Saara Nüganen, Karl Robert Saaremäe, Henessi Schmidt	Historical Comedy-Drama	
Asjad, millest me ei räägi		Andrejs Ekis, Tanel Ingi	Jan Uuspõld, Ragne Pekarev, Liis Karpov, Egon Nuter, Liina Tennosaar, Rain Tolk, Jekaterina Novosjolova, Kait Kall, Klaudia Tiitsmaa	Comedy	
Hüvasti, NSVL	Goodbye Soviet Union	Lauri Randla	Elene Baratashvili, Dima Bespalov, Ülle Kaljuste, Sten Karpov, Niklas Kouzmitchev, Jekaterina Novosjolova, Pääru Oja, Tõnu Oja, Anne Reemann, Nika Savolainen, Piret Krumm, Luule Komissarov	Historical Comedy	Coproduction; Finland; Estonia
Rain	Rain	Janno Jürgens	Aleksei Beljajev, Marcus Borkmann, Meelo Eliisabet Kriisa, Laine Mägi, Rein Oja, Indrek Ojari, Magdalena Poplawska, Andres Roosimaa, Meelis Rämmeld, Viktor Susi, Ivo Uukkivi	Drama	
Viimased	The Last Ones	Veiko Õunpuu	Pääru Oja, Tommi Korpela, Laura Birn, Elmer Bäck, Samuli Edelmann, Sulevi Peltola, Jarkko Lahti, Tero Jartti, Emmi Parviainen, Pertti Sveholm, Juhan Ulfsak	Comedy, Crime-Drama	Coproduction; Estonia; Finland
Salmonid. 25 aastat hiljem	Salmons. 25 Years Later	Toomas Kirss	Ita Ever, Maria Avdjuško, Karolin Jürise, Guido Kangur, Kersti Kreismann, Ain Lutsepp, Rein Oja, Merle Palmiste, Rita Rätsepp, Eduard Toman, Andrus Vaarik	Comedy	
O2	O2	Margus Paju	Priit Võigemast, Kaspars Znotiņš, Agnese Cīrule, Ieva Andrejevaitė, Tiit Lilleorg, Sampo Sarkola, Pääru Oja, Tambet Tuisk, Rein Oja, Elmo Nüganen, Johan Kristjan Aimla, Vaidotas Martinaitis, Valentin Novopolskij, Indrek Ojari, Alo Kõrve, Hele Kõrve, Amanda Hermiine Künnapas, Doris Tislar, Gilberto Pulga, Dainis Sumišķis, Gatis Gāga, Tõnu Oja	Historical Spy Drama	Coproduction; Estonia; Finland; Latvia; Lithuania
Vee peal	On the Water	Peeter Simm	Rasmus Ermel, Kalju Orro, Maria Klenskaja, Evelin Võigemast, Marko Matvere, Liisa Aibel, Hilje Murel, Anne Reemann, Aurora Aleksandra Künnapas, Aarne Soro, Guido Kangur, Terje Pennie, Andres Lepik, Indrek Taalmaa, Kärt Kross-Merilo, Meelis Rämmeld	Comedy-Drama	
Jõulud džunglis	Christmas in the Jungle	Jaak Kilmi	Pääru Oja, Tõnu Kark, Saara Pius, Bojan Emeršič, Rebeka Šuksta, Viktorija Bencik Emeršič, Elizabete Liepa, Rukman Rosadi	Family Film	
2021
Eesti matus	Estonian Funeral	René Vilbre	Tambet Tuisk, Jan Uuspõld, Merle Palmiste, Markus Habakukk, Peeter Oja, Hilje Murel, Ago Anderson, Anna Sergejeva, Sandra Ashilevi, Ivo Linna	Comedy	
Kratt	Kratt	Rasmus Merivoo	Mari Lill, Nora Merivoo, Harri Merivoo, Elise Tekko, Roland Treima, Mari-Liis Lill, Marek Tammets, Ivo Uukkivi, Paul Purga, Paul Laasik, Venno Loosaar, Juhan Rodrik, Jaanus Mehikas, Alo Kurvits, Jan Uuspõld, Svetlana Zanina, Birgit Veiler, Rolf Põhjala	Fantasy-Comedy	
Sandra saab tööd	Sandra Gets a Job	Kaupo Kruusiauk	Mari Abel, Kaie Mihkelson, Raimo Pass, Henrik Kalmet, Jarmo Reha, Hendrik Toompere Jr., Hendrik Toompere Jr. Jr., Tiina Tauraite, Alo Kõrve, Carmen Mikiver, Viktor Susi	Drama	
Tulilind	Firebird	Peeter Rebane	Tom Prior, Oleg Zagorodnii, Nicholas Woodeson, Diana Pozharskaya, Jake Henderson, Kaspar Velberg, Henessi Schmidt, Ester Kuntu, Sten Karpov, Margus Prangel, Mihkel Kabel, Dani Yarovsky, Britta Soll, Carmen Mikiver, Marek Rosenberg, Silver Kaljula, Rasmus Kaljujärv, Lauri Mäesepp	Historical Romantic Drama	English language Coproduction; Estonia; United Kingdom
Öölapsed	Kids of the Night	Priit Pääsuke	Grete Konksi, Piret Krumm, Alice Siil, Jaune Kimmel, Mart Müürisepp, Amanda Hermiine Künnapas, Alo Kõrve, Liis Lemsalu, Kristjan Lüüs, Laine Mägi, Peeter Oja, Juss Haasma, Ott Lepland, Ines Aru, Miika Pihlak, Lauri Pedaja, Liisa Saaremäel, Argo Aadli, Katariina Tamm, Franz Malmsten, Enni-Britta Esna	Comedy-Drama	
Jahihooaeg	Hunting Season	Ergo Kuld	Harriet Toompere, Mirtel Pohla, Grete Kuld, Jan Uuspõld, Priit Loog, Hendrik Sal-Saller, Indrek Taalmaa, Kaire Vilgats, Koit Toome, Art Aleksander Tatter	Comedy	
2022
Kiik, kirves ja igavese armastuse puu	Tree of Eternal Love	Meel Paliale	Urmet Piiling, Herman Pihlak, Marko Matvere, Andrus Vaarik, Jan Uuspõld, Egon Nuter, Mihkel Raud, Franz Malmsten, Hanna-Ly Aavik, Pirte Laura Lember, Toomas Tross, Valter Uusberg, Raivo Hein	Comedy	
Kuues saladus	The Sixth Secret				
Soo	The Bog	Ergo Kuld	Franz Malmsten, Hanna-Ly Aavik, Helgur Rosental, Martin Kork, Grete Klein, Liis Lass, Märten Matsu, Toomas Suuman, Indrek Taalmaa, Epp Eespäev	Historical Romance-Drama	Screenwritten by Martin Algus. Based on the 1914 novel Soo by Oskar Luts
Tagurpidi torn	The Sleeping Beast	Jaak Kilmi	Reimo Sagor, Ester Kuntu, Rasmus Ermel, Marek Rosenberg, Evelin Võigemast, Jaanika Arum, Rebeka Kask, Nils Jaagup England, Riho Kütsar, Anti Kobin, Kimi Reiko Pilipenko, Juuli Lill, Una Marta Soms, Andres Lepik, Laura Vahtre	Thriller	
Apteeker Melchior	Melchior the Apothecary	Elmo Nüganen	Märten Metsaviir, Alo Kõrve, Maarja Johanna Mägi, Siim Kelner, Ken Rüütel, Marko Matvere, Martin Kork, Mait Malmsten, Kristjan Sarv, Andero Ermel, Franz Malmsten, Henessi Schmidt, Hendrik Toompere Jr., Jaan Pehk, Gatis Gaga, Helgur Rosental, Volli Käro, Sten Zupping, Martin Mill, Maria Kaabel, Loora-Eliise Kaarelson, Amanda Hermiine Künnapas	Historical Mystery-Thriller	Based on the Apteeker Melchior book series by Indrek Hargla
Apteeker Melchior. Viirastus	Melchior the Apothecary. The Ghost	Elmo Nüganen	Märten Metsaviir, Loviise Kapper, Martin Kork, Alo Kurvits, Volli Käro, Alo Kõrve, Tiia Lauring, Fatme-Helge Leevald, Riina Maidre, Mait Malmsten, Marko Matvere, Carmen Mikiver, Dain Muru, Maarja Johanna Mägi, Tarmo Männard, Kert Mõttus, Egon Nuter, Maris Nõlvak, Raivo Trass, Rain Simmul, Tiit Palu, Jaan Pehk, Silva Pijon, Ken Rüütel, Aleksandr Popov, Margus Roosipuu, Eduard Salmistu, Ursel Tilk, Eduard Tee, Simeoni Sundja	Historical Mystery-Thriller	Based on the novel Apothecary Melchior and the Mystery of St Olaf 's Church by Indrek Hargla
Apteeker Melchior. Timuka tütar	Melchior the Apothecary. The Executioner's Daughter	Elmo Nüganen	Märten Metsaviir, Johan Kristjan Aimla, Faustus Bolitshenko, Liis Maria Kaabel, Alo Kõrve, Hele Kõrve, Markus Luik, Martin Mill, Maarja Johanna Mägi, Margus Prangel, Andres Mähar, Tarmo Männard, Jaan Pehk, Aleksandr Popov, Ott Raidmets, Jaan Rekkor, Ken Rüütel, Karl Robert Saaremäe, Jan Uuspõld, Martin Veinmann, Simeoni Sundja, Gabriele Amine Ahwazian, Karl Jakob Bartels, Liis Maria Kaabel, Jaan Tristan Kolberg, Kristjan Lüüs, Kädi Metsoja, Margo Mitt, Dain Muru, Oskar Punga, Margus Roosipuu	Historical Mystery-Thriller	Based on the novel Apothecary Melchior: The Executionar's Daughter by Indrek Hargla
Erik Kivisüda	Erik Stoneheart	Ilmar Raag	Herman Avandi, Nickel Bösenberg, Florin Gussak, Renārs Kaupers, Andres Lepik, Ronald Pelin, Laura Peterson-Aardam, Norbert Rutili, Kristjan Sarv, Hendrik Toompere Jr. Jr., Elina Purde, Juhan Ulfsak, Nero Urke, Jules Werner	Fantasy-Adventure	
Kalev	Kalev	Ove Musting	Mait Malmsten, Reimo Sagor, Priit Võigemast, Mihkel Kuusk, Ott Kartau, Veiko Porkanen, Kristjan Sarv, Siim Maaten, Artūrs Putniņš, Howard Frier, Jonathan Peterson, Rauno Polman, Andris Keišs, Mathias Leedo, Jēkabs Reinis, Margus Jaanovits, Sulev Teppart, Jekaterina Kordas, Igor Rogatsov, Üllar Saaremäe, Liisa Saaremäel, Raimo Pass, Karin Tammaru, Rain Tolk, Timur Ilikajev, Nero Urke, Tõnu Leemet, Mihkel Loot, Kaspar Velberg, Taavi Teplenkov, Piret Kalda, Hilje Murel, Indrek Sammul, Anne Reemann, Meelis Rämmeld	Historical Drama	
2023
Kuulsuse narrid	Fools of Fame	Ain Mäeots	Veiko Porkanen, Karl Robert Saaremäe, Maiken Pius, Ott Sepp, Argo Aadli, Vallo Kirs, Margo Mitt, Saara Nüganen, Loviise Kapper, Marian Heinat, Stefan Kristofer Soeson, Guido Kangur, Margus Jaanovits, Jüri Lumiste, Ott Raidmets, Tiit Sukk, Maria Kasesalu	Historical Comedy	
Kurvilise tee legendid	Legends of the Winding Road	Tarvo Mölder		Documentary	
Savvusanna sõsarad	Smoke Sauna Sisterhood	Anna Hints		Documentary	
Suvitajad	The Vacationers	Ergo Kuld	Ago Anderson, Kristel Elling, Maarja Jakobson, Olev Sten Erik Jõgi, Robert Klein, Lauri Nebel, Pääru Oja, Meelis Rämmeld, Adele Taska, Kaire Vilgats	Comedy	
Taevatrepp	Stairway to Heaven	Mart Kivastik	Mait Malmsten, Timotheus Sammul, Harriet Toompere, Raivo Trass, Rita Raave, Ivo Uukkivi, Katariina Unt, Voldemar Kuslap, Hannes Hermaküla, Kaie Mihkelson, Külli Teetamm, Tõnu Oja, Kaarel Pogga, Kersti Heinloo, Lena Barbara Luhse, Aurora Aleksandra Künnapas, Taavi Teplenkov, Rasmus Ermel, Guido Kangur, Marta Laan, Sepo Seeman, Aarne Soro, Tiit Sukk, Piret Simson, Indrek Sammul, Pärtel Väärt, Karl Filipp Varres, Pirjo Jonas, Tiit Palu, Tiia Kriisa, Andres Lepik, Kristo Viiding, Jüri Lumiste	Comedy	Adaptation of Mart Kivastik's novel Taevatrepp
Tähtsad ninad	Totally Boss	Ingomar Vihmar	Ruben Tolk, Mait Malmsten, Saara Pius, Nora Mia Pai, Mattias Naan, Lumi Soomets, Kleer Maibaum, Robert Alexander Peets, Elo-Mirt Oja	Family Comedy	
Nähtamatu võitlus	The Invisible Fight	Rainer Sarnet	Ursel Tilk, Kaarel Pogga, Ester Kuntu, Indrek Sammul, Mari Abel, Maria Avdjuško, Marika Barabanstsikova, Jan Gebruk, Ekke Märten Hekles, Rein Oja, Rain Simmul, Tiina Tauraite	Action-Comedy	
Tume paradiis	Dark Paradise	Triin Ruumet	Rea Lest-Liik, Jörgen Liik, Steffi Pähn, Liisa Saaremäel, Juhan Ulfsak, Reimo Sagor, Maria Avdjuško, Ain Mäeots, Kaie Mihkelson, Kristo Viiding, Priit Loog, Hendrik Sal-Saller, Ott Aardam, Üllar Saaremäe, Egon Nuter, Artur Talvik, Mart Nurk, Helena Merzin-Tamm, Katariina Tamm, Eva Püssa, Anu Pahka, Britta Soll, Allan Noormets, Margo Mitt, Tõnn Lamp	Drama	
Vaba raha	Free Money	Rain Rannu	Märt Pius, Miklós Bányai, Steffi Pähn, Ivo Uukkivi, Amanda Hermiine Künnapas, Einar Kuusk, Mari Lill, Mathias Kermes, Indrek Kasela, Aidan Carroll, Marta Laan	Comedy-Drama	
2024
Tulnukas 2 ehk Valdise tagasitulek 17 osas	Alien 2 or: The Return of Valdis in 17 Episodes	Rasmus Merivoo	Märt Avandi, Ott Sepp, Vallo Kirs, Liisa Pulk, Kaia Skoblov, Tõnn Lamp, Marek Tammets, Indrek Ojari, Ago Anderson, Indrek Taalmaa, Merle Jääger, Kaido Veermäe, Marek Kalmus	Comedy	
Biwa järve 8 nägu	8 Views of Lake Biwa	Marko Raat	Elina Masing, Tiina Tauraite, Hendrik Toompere Jr., Meelis Rämmeld, Kärt Kokkota, Simeoni Sundja, Jarmo Reha, Maarja Jakobson, Toomas Saarepera, Jan Uuspõld, Jüri Vlassov, Liina Tennosaar, Peeter Tammearu, Jekaterina Moskalenko, Tommi Korpela, Erki Laur, Ronald Mäeots, Indrek Spungin	Drama-Romance	
Elu ja armastus	Life and Love	Helen Takkin	Karolin Jürise, Mait Malmsten, Loviise Kapper, Christel Sootla, Raho Võrno, Kalev Võrno, Mia Intermitte, Aleksei Shilikin, Helgur Rosental, Kristiina-Hortensia Port, Tõnis Niinemets, Laura Kukk, Markus Habakukk, Alo Kõrve, Mihkel Kabel, Ursel Tilk, Villiam Sinijärv, Steffi Pähn	Historical Drama	
Igavene suvi	Infinite Summer	Miguel Llansó	Hannah Gross, Johanna Aurelia Rosin, Teele Kaljuvee-O'Brock, Ciaron Davies, Denise Moreno, Steve Vanoni, Katariina Unt, Ivo Uukkivi, Anne Paluver, Sissi Nylia Benita, Lily Yuri, Maarja Jakobson, Erki Veiko, Agustín Mateo, Kristin Kalamees, Saamuel Pilpak, Theodor Tabor, Germo Toonikus, Markus Mikk, Mikk Rand, Jelena Garanina, Hendra Raud Zoo, Alis Mäesalu, Roland Treima, Erko Kundla, Carlos Lesmes	Science Fiction-Thriller-Adventure	Estonia; United States; Spain
Mind on kaks	Two of Me	Raul Esko, Romet Esko	Raul Esko, Romet Esko, Priit Pius, Märt Pius, Rain Tolk, Reimo Sagor, Tom Olaf Urb, Amanda Hermiine Künnapas, Einar Kuusk, Mirtel Pohla, Kristiina-Hortensia Port, Vincent Veike, Markkus Pulk, Mari-Ly Kapp, Karl Hendrik Rattus, Mari Lill, Tanel Toom, Franz Malmsten Jr., Anne Paluver, Tiina Tauraite, Mart Toome, Tambet Tuisk, Elisabet Reinsalu, Evelin Võigemast	Comedy	
Kikilipsuga Mässaja	Rebel with a Bow Tie	Jaan Tootsen	Toomas Hendrik Ilves	Documentary	
Pikad paberid	Rolling Papers	Meel Paliale	Mihkel Kuusk, Karl Birnbaum, Maria Helena Seppik, Edgar Vunš, Kaur Tõra, Urmet Piiling, Herman Pihlak, Hanna Jaanovits, Joonas Lass, Rasmus Tikerpe, Lotta-Lizbeth Hirv, Juhan Soon, Ekke Janisk, Elina Soosaar, Robin Täpp, Oskar Kröönström, Astra Irene Susi	Comedy-Drama	
Vari	The Shadow	Jaak Kilmi	Pääru Oja, Rain Simmul, Karol Kuntsel, Kersti Heinloo, Peeter Tammearu, Riho Kütsar, Ago Anderson, Andres Mähar, Alice Siil, Tarmo Tagamets, Meelis Rämmeld, Veiko Jänes, Audra Mišinite, Lena Barbara Luhse, Indrek Sammul, Margus Jaanovits, Jass Suursild, Berit Juhkam, Enn Lillemets	Historical Crime-Drama	
Must auk	The Black Hole	Moonika Siimets	Ursel Tilk, Liina Tennosaar, Rea Lest-Liik, Doris Tislar, Anne Reemann, Eva Koldits, Kristo Viiding, Jekaterina Linnamäe, Laine Mägi, Hannu-Pekka Björkman, Peeter Volkonski, Aarne Soro, Nils Mattias Steinberg, Peeter Oja, Markus Habakukk, Tõnu Alveus, Indrek Taalmaa, Peeter Tammearu	Science Fiction-Comedy-Drama	
Mootorsaed laulsid	Chainsaws Were Singing	Sander Maran	Karl Joosep Ilves, Laura Niils, Martin Ruus, Janno Puusepp, Rita Rätsepp, Mart Toome, Ra Ragnar Novod, Henryk Johan Novod, Peeter Maran, Thomas Kolli, Olavi Saar, Mart Vugt, Sander Lee Merila, Kristo Klausson, Heiki Zvorovski	Comedy-Horror-Musical	
Vara küps	Vertical Money	Martti Helde		Documentary	
2025
Aurora	Aurora	Andres Maimik, Rain Tolk	Maarja Johanna Mägi, Ott Kartau, Jörgen Liik, Kersti Heinloo, Indrek Taalmaa, Rea Lest-Liik, Karin Rask, Margus Jaanovits, Simeoni Sundja, Robert Linna, Anti Reinthal, Sten Zupping, Liisa Linhein	Drama	
Ühemõõtmeline mees	One-Dimensional Man	Andres Puustusmaa	Juhan Ulfsak, Yang Ge, Mait Malmsten, Jaanika Arum, Julia Aug, Elmo Nüganen, Leonard Puustusmaa, Franz Malmsten Jr., Pääru Oja, Tõnis Niinemets, Harriet Toompere, Andres Puustusmaa, Peeter Tammearu, Juku Kalle Raid, Anton Aleksejev, Andres Kaljuste, Aire Ihats, Liina Tennosaar, Ervin Õunapuu	Drama	
Uus raha	New Money	Rain Rannu	Märt Pius, Steffi Pähn, Jim Ashilevi, Mari Jürjens, Mikk Jürjens, Rasmus Kaljujärv, Henrik Kalmet, Ivo Linna, Hanna Martinson, Elina Masing, Keith Siilats, Karin Tammaru, Ivo Uukkivi, Erki Veiko, Edgar Vunš	Comedy	
Mo Papa	Mo Papa	Eeva Mägi	Jarmo Reha, Rednar Annus, Ester Kuntu, Paul Abiline	Drama	
Jan Uuspõld läheb koju	Jan Uuspõld Goes Home	Andres Maimik, Rain Tolk	Jan Uuspõld, Liisa Saaremäel, Liisa Linhein, Hanna Martinson, Anna-Greta Raal, Andrei Zevakin, Robin Valting, Erlend Staub, Maria Helena Seppik, Ain Mäeots, Raul Saaremets, Andres Maimik, Grete Jürgenson, Lasse Nõgisto, Tarvo Sõmer, Ruben Tolk, Miriam Mia Maimik, Franz Malmsten	Comedy	
2026
Säärane mulk	What a Bumpkin!	Ergo Kuld	Ago Anderson, Maria Teresa Kalmet, Märt Koik, Piret Krumm, Pääru Oja, Amanda Rebeca Padar, Raimo Pass, Leonhard Sass Taalmaa, Jan Uuspõld	Historical Comedy	Based on the 1872 play Säärane mulk by Lydia Koidula
Täiuslikud võõrad	Perfect Strangers	Arun Tamm	Mait Malmsten, Maiken Pius, Evelin Võigemast, Kaspar Velberg, Tõnis Niinemets, Henessi Schmidt, Jaanus Mehikas, Helina Tüür, Kamila Kabasinskaite Konstantin	Comedy-Drama	
Meie Erika	Our Erika	German Golub	Karolin Jürise, Erki Laur, Rodion Kuzmin, Viktor Lanberg, Katariina Tamm, Ülle Kaljuste, Mari Abel, Simeoni Sundja, Tiit Sukk, Milena Mishkevich, Pääru Oja, Saara Kõiv, Juhan Ulfsak, Tiina Tauraite, Priit Loog, Kaspar Velberg, Silva Pijon, Ronja Marie Tepp	Historical Drama	Biopic of Estonian track bicycle racer Erika Salumäe
Midagi tõelist	Something Real	Evar Anvelt	Jan Uuspõld, Jaanika Arum, Ester Kuntu, Derek Leheste, Kity Liis Kallas, Sofia Gonchev, Maru Põlder, Riina Maidre, Giedrius Arbačiauskas, Linus Mikuta, Martin Algus	Drama-Thriller	Adapted from the 2018 novel of the same name by Martin Algus
Morten	Morten	Ivan Pavljutskov	Tõru Kannimäe, Helena Maria Reisner, Emili Rohumaa, Andres Mähar, Külli Teetamm, Konrad Kose, Aimei Zuo, Steven-Märt Helerand, Aleksandr Babkin, Marta Kiisa, Oskar Kröönström, Priit Loog, Gert Raudsep, Martin Aadamsoo, Liina Olmaru, Petteri Hasa	Drama	
Musta pori näkku	Dirt in Your Face	Jaak Kilmi	Timotheus Sammul, Erik Hermaküla, Erling Eding, Carolyn Veensalu, Rudolfs Apse, Ott Aardam, Karl-Erik Alalooga, Ago Anderson, Nikolai Bentsler, Mattias Hint, Simo Andre Kadastu, Jaune Kimmel, Riho Kütsar, Eke Rolf Laan, Mauri Liiv, Carmen Mikiver, Jane Napp, Priit Pius	Historical Drama	
