= The Power of Fear =

- Directed by: Oleg Fesenko
- Screenplay by: Igor Mitushyn
- Starring: Valery Nikolaev; Evgeniya Kryukova; Lembit Ulfsak
- Cinematography: Arunas; Baraznauskas
- Edited by: Yaroslav Mochalov
- Music by: Oleg Fedoseyev; Ilar Oale
- Release date: 2006
- Running time: 96 minutes
- Country: Russia
- Languages: Russian; English; Polish; German

The Power of Fear (Russian: «Ведьма», romanized: Vedma, lit. 'Witch'), also known as Evil, is a 2006 Russian gothic horror film directed by Oleg Fesenko and starring Valery Nikolaev in the lead. It is loosely based on Nikolai Gogol's story "Viy".

== Plot summary ==
A journalist (Valery Nikolaev) is sent on an assignment to investigate paranormal phenomena occurring in a nearby town, but on the way he gets caught up in a haunted mansion to shelter from the rain, from where all his troubles begin.

== Cast ==
- Valery Nikolaev as Ivan
- Evgeniya Kryukova as Marryl
- Lembit Ulfsak as Chief Sheriff
- Arnis Licitis as Mr. Patch
- Juhan Ulfsak as Deputy #1
- Rain Tolk as Deputy #2
- Ita Ever as Old Lady
- Ian Rekkor as Priest
- Peeter Volkonski as Doctor
- Anu Lamp as Kathleen
- Kati Kivitar as Waitress Margo
- Epp Eespäev as Waitress Debora
- Anastasia Ruusmaa as Third Waitress
- Margus Prangel as Mechanic
- Tõnu Kark as Cook

== Production ==
The film was mainly shot in Estonia and had early working titles of The Last Prayer and Viy: In the Power of Fear.
