= Mother (2016 Estonian film) =

2016 film

- Film poster
- Directed by: Kadri Kõusaar
- Written by: Al Wallcat; Leana Jalukse
- Starring: Tiina Mälberg
- Release date: 7 January 2016
- Running time: 89 minutes
- Country: Estonia
- Language: Estonian

Mother (Estonian: Ema) is a 2016 Estonian drama film directed by Kadri Kõusaar. It was selected as the Estonian entry for the Best Foreign Language Film at the 89th Academy Awards but it was not nominated.

== Cast ==
- Tiina Mälberg as Mother
- Andres Tabun as Father
- Andres Noormets as Aarne
- Siim Maaten as Lauri
- Jaak Prints as Andres
- Rea Lest as Riin
- Jaan Pehk as Policeman
- Getter Meresmaa as Kimberly
- Katrin Kalma as Liina
- Marin Mägi-Efert as Sister
- Margus Mikomägi as Ranger
- Liis Laigna as Doctor
- Märten Matsu as Karl-Andreas

== See also ==
- List of submissions to the 89th Academy Awards for Best Foreign Language Film
- List of Estonian submissions for the Academy Award for Best Foreign Language Film
