= Veiko Porkanen =

Estonian actor (born 1989)

Veiko Porkanen (born 4 January 1989) is an Estonian actor.

Porkanen was born in Põltsamaa. In 2014 he graduated from Estonian Music and Theatre Academy. Since 2014 he has worked as an actor at Vanemuine Theatre. Besides theatre roles he has also played in several films.

== Filmography ==
- 2015: Must alpinist
- 2017: Sangarid
- 2019: Johannes Pääsukese tõeline elu
- 2019: Reetur (television series)
- 2023: Kuulsuse narrid
