= Kärt Kross =

Estonian actress

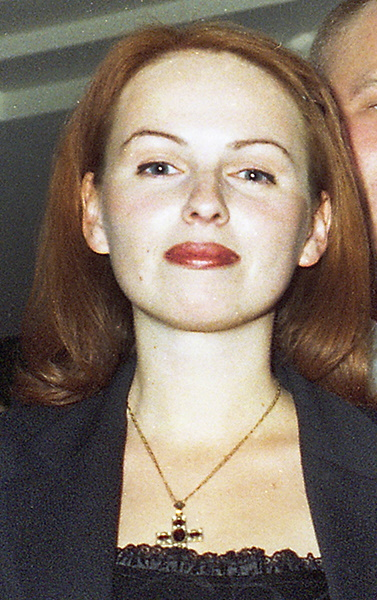
Kärt Kross in 1999

Kärt Kross (née Kärt Hansberg; born 1 January 1968) is an Estonian actress.

Kross was born in Tallinn. From 1986 until 1996, she worked at Estonian Drama Theatre. Besides theatrical roles she has also appeared in several films.

== Filmography ==
- 1985 Puud olid ... (There were the trees...) (feature film; role: Ell)
- 1986 Saja aasta pärast mais (feature film; role: Juliana Telman)
- 1987 Tants aurukatla ümber (television film; role: Vilma)
- 1991 Ankur (feature film; role: Iris)
- 1992 Lammas all paremas nurgas (feature film; role: Daughter 1)
- 1994 Ameerika mäed (feature film; role: Sirje)
- 2006-2013 Kelgukoerad (television series; role: Airi / Archive administrator)
- 2007 Brigaad 3 (television series; role: Margit)
- 2015 Pilvede all (television series: role: Doctor)
- 2017 Merivälja (television series; role: Ülle)
- 2018 Elu hammasratastel (feature film)
- 2018 Õigus õnnele (feature film: role: Principal Tiina)
