= New Money (2025 film) =

- Estonian: Uus raha
- Directed by: Rain Rannu
- Written by: Rain Rannu
- Produced by: Rain Rannu; Tõnu Hiielaid
- Starring: Märt Pius; Steffi Pähn; Elina Masing; Keith Siilats
- Cinematography: Ants Tammik
- Edited by: Rain Rannu; Moonika Raidam
- Music by: Janek Murd; Bert On Beats
- Production company: Tallifornia
- Release date: October 7, 2025
- Running time: 101 minutes
- Country: Estonia
- Language: Estonian

New Money (Uus raha) is a 2025 Estonian comedy film written and directed by Rain Rannu. It serves as a thematic sequel to Rannu's 2023 film Vaba raha (Free Money). The film stars Märt Pius and Steffi Pähn as a couple who suddenly acquire a massive fortune and must navigate the complexities of wealth, inflation, and investment scams.

The film premiered at the 29th Tallinn Black Nights Film Festival (PÖFF) in late 2025.

== Plot ==
The film picks up where the previous installment, Vaba raha, left off. Taavi (Märt Pius), a modest IT specialist, and his wife Liisa (Steffi Pähn), a schoolteacher, discover one morning that their bank account holds 50 million euros—the result of a cryptocurrency windfall.

While the previous film dealt with the "gold rush" of acquiring crypto assets, Uus raha focuses on the psychological and logistical aftermath of sudden wealth. The couple attempts to maintain their normal lives but are quickly beset by the pressures of inflation, questionable investment opportunities, and the envy of those around them. Their situation attracts the attention of Alina (Elina Masing), a skilled con artist who partners with an older fraudster to swindle the new millionaires out of their fortune.

== Cast ==
- Märt Pius as Taavi, an IT specialist who becomes an overnight multi-millionaire.
- Steffi Pähn as Liisa, Taavi's wife and a schoolteacher.
- Elina Masing (also known as Valge Tüdruk) as Alina, a con artist.
- Keith Siilats as Tommy, a private jet pilot with a nihilistic worldview.
- Ivo Uukkivi as Erik, a banker.
- Edgar Vunš as Einar, a fraudster associate.
- Henrik Kalmet as Tõnu, a startupper.
- Jim Ashilevi as Karlos, a cryptocurrency trader.
- Mari Jürjens as Maarja.
- Mikk Jürjens as Priit.
- Katariina Libe as journalist.
- Rasmus Kaljujärv as husband.

== Production ==
The film was produced by the Estonian independent production company Tallifornia, founded by Rain Rannu and Tõnu Hiielaid. Rannu, a technology entrepreneur turned filmmaker, has frequently explored themes of startups and financial technology in his previous works, such as Chasing Unicorns (2019).

Filming took place on location in Estonia and Miami, Florida, contrasting the characters' modest domestic life with the "nouveau riche" lifestyle of Miami. The soundtrack features a recurring motif based on the song "Igatsus" by the Estonian band Apelsin.

== Reception ==
Uus raha received generally positive reviews from Estonian critics, who noted its entertainment value and timely commentary on financial literacy.

Tristan Priimägi of ERR (Estonian Public Broadcasting) described the film as "very entertaining," specifically praising the mid-film appearance of Keith Siilats. Priimägi noted that Siilats's performance as the pilot Tommy provided a "refreshing nihilistic philosophy" that revitalized the film's pacing.

Critics at Postimees highlighted the film's exploration of how money amplifies existing personality traits rather than fundamentally changing people.
