= Andres Mähar =

Estonian actor (born 1978)

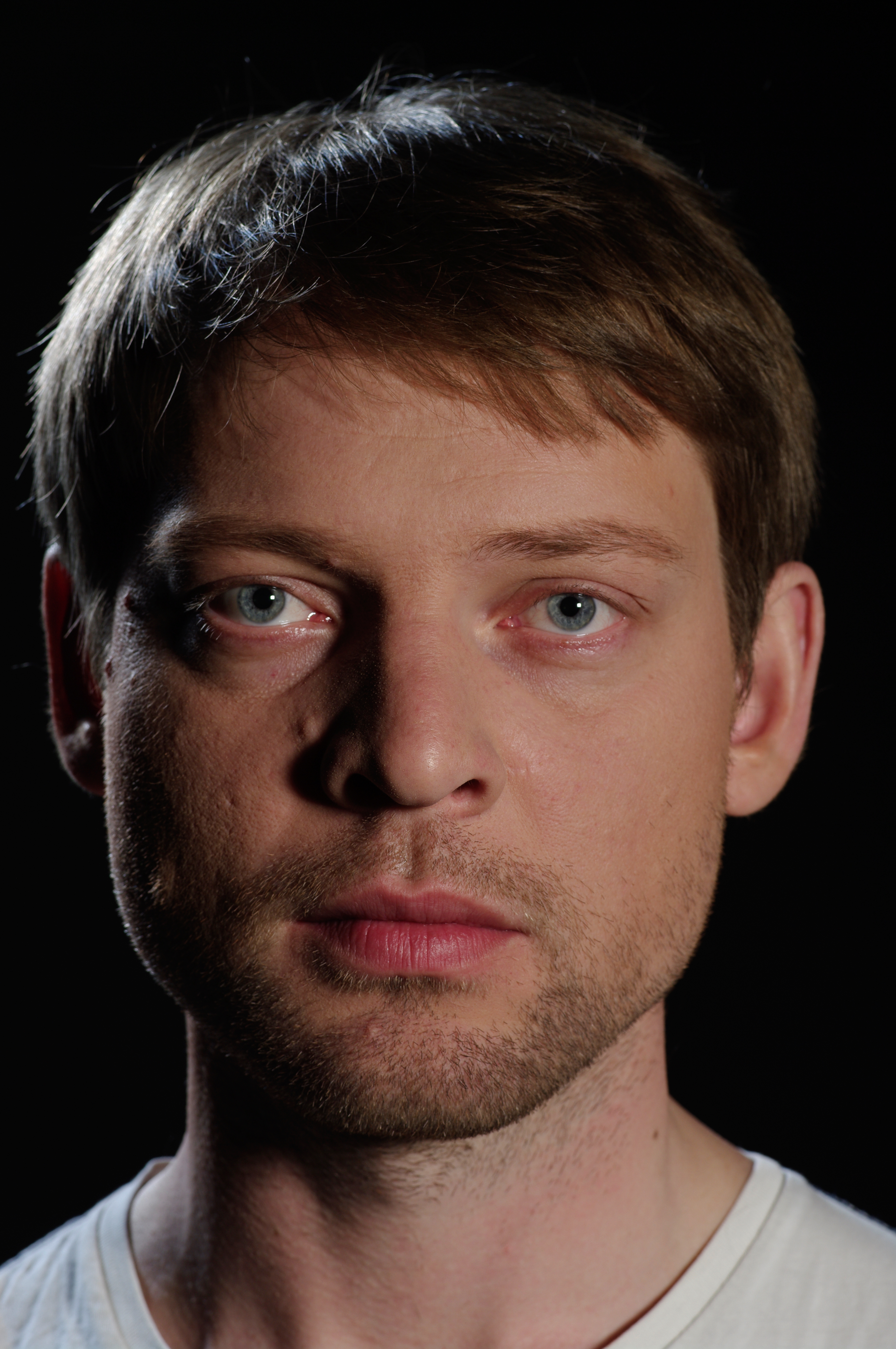
Andres Mähar in 2013

Andres Mähar (born 2 February 1978) is an Estonian actor.

Mähar was born in Tartu. He studied at Türi Secondary School and sang in the Türi Boys' Choir. In 1996, he enrolled at the Estonian Academy of Music and Theatre's performing arts department in Tallinn, studying acting under course supervisor Ingo Normet, graduating in 2000.

From 2000 until 2006, and again since 2011, he been a contracted actor at the Vanemuine theatre in Tartu. From 2006 until 2011, he worked at the NO99 Theatre. Besides stage roles he has also acted on films and television series.

In 2024, he began appearing in the role of Ardo in the Ergo Kuld directed TV3 drama Valetamisklubi.

== Selected filmography ==
- Lovesick (2003)
- Täna öösel me ei maga (2004) – second car thief
- August 1991 (2005) – Paul
- Kodu keset linna (2007) – Ervin
- Brigaad 3 (2008) – Andrei
- Detsembrikuumus (2008) – Mait
- Pangarööv (2009) – security guard
- Pihv (2009) – Riho
- Kalevipojad (2011) – Anti
- Kelgukoerad (2011) – Eero
- Polaarpoiss (2016) – policeman
- Mehetapja/Süütu/Vari (2017) – driver
- Võta või jäta (2018) – Sven
- Tõde ja õigus (2019) – Rava Kustas
- Vari (2024) – Opman
