= Sõprus-Druzhba =

2006 Estonian-Finnish short film

- Sõprus-Дружба (Russian)
- Directed by: Anu Pennanen
- Written by: Anu Pennanen
- Starring: Ilya Alpatov; Erich Hartvich; Madis Mäeorg; Sille Paas; Ronald Pelin; Häli Ann Reintam; Olena Romanjuk; Mari Tammesalu; Steven Vihalemm
- Music by: Stefan Németh
- Production companies: F-Seitse; Virta Productions
- Distributed by: Palo Art Productions
- Release date: 2006
- Running time: 31 minutes
- Countries: Estonia, Finland
- Languages: Estonian, Russian

Sõprus-Druzhba or Sõprus-Дружба (English: Friendship) is an Estonian-Finnish short film by Finnish director Anu Pennanen. The film serves as the culmination of the Tallinn Project, an initiative undertaken by the filmmaker and nine teenagers from Tallinn, Estonia in 2004–2007, which explored the attitudes of Estonia's youth towards public spaces and the continuing urbanisation of their capital. Primarily, the film depicts how the teenagers have found their own ways to interact with the city, using public locations such as the Maarjamäe Memorial and Viru Keskus shopping centre, among other spaces, for recreation. Furthermore, by overseeing the actions and, later, confluence of two sets of teenagers – one with Estonian and the other with Russian as their mother tongue – which results in a "tentative camaraderie", the film also addresses the development of ethnic relations in Estonia following the fall of the Soviet Union.

The film was selected for addition to both the Estonian Film Archives and the Finnish Central Archives of Visual Art.
