= Set Point (film) =

2004 film directed by Ilmar Taska

- French: Täna öösel me ei maga
- Directed by: Ilmar Taska
- Produced by: Kristian Taska
- Production company: Taska Film
- Release date: 2004
- Country: Estonia
- Language: Estonian

Set Point (Estonian: Täna öösel me ei maga) is a 2004 Estonian film directed by Ilmar Taska.

== Plot ==
The film opens in Tallinn, Estonia, where Älis (Carmen Kass), a beautiful but vulnerable young woman, is sitting in a café with her possessive, physically abusive boyfriend, Leo (Veikko Täär). Moments after they leave the café, a masked gunman approaches and shoots Leo dead in broad daylight.The brutal murder is witnessed by two independent bystanders: Kristofer (Priit Võigemast), an ordinary young man walking nearby, and Evelin (Maria Avdjuško), a wealthy, deeply unhappy woman trapped in a toxic, loveless marriage. Evelin’s husband is Harri (Peter Franzén), a high-ranking, powerful police investigator.Harri quickly takes official charge of the murder investigation. However, rather than seeking justice or protecting the eyewitnesses, Harri utilizes his position to control the narrative. He is heavily entangled in the criminal underworld, and the murder threatens to expose his own corrupt dealings and financial secrets.As the night progresses, the lives of the four central characters become dangerously intertwined. Harri manipulates the evidence to frame Kristofer and Älis, turning them into the primary suspects. Finding themselves targeted by both the corrupt police force and ruthless underworld criminals, Kristofer and Älis are forced to flee together through the neon-lit, chaotic streets of Tallinn.Meanwhile, Evelin discovers the depth of her husband's corruption. She is forced to choose between the safety of her affluent, "golden cage" lifestyle and doing the right thing. Trust becomes an impossibility as every character lies to protect themselves. The frantic, single-night pursuit culminates in a tense, violent showdown where alliances are shattered, and the characters must face the lethal consequences of greed, passion, and betrayal.

== Cast ==
- Carmen Kass as Älis
- Priit Võigemast as Kristofer
- Maria Avdjuško as Evelin
- Peter Franzén a Harri
- Veikko Täär as Leo
- Helen Mahmastol as Tennis Player
- Ivo Uukkivi as Kuldar
- Oleg Rogatchov as Oleg
- Ülle Kaljuste as Waitress
- Ksenja Agarkova as Helen
- Rain Simmul as Markus
- Margus Prangel as Policeman 1
- Tarmo Muld as Policeman 2
- Igor Netshajev as Policeman 3
- Margus Tohter as Surveyor
- Üllar Saaremäe as The Pimp
