= Andres Tabun =

Estonian actor

Andres Tabun (born 1 December 1954) is an Estonian actor.

Tabun was born in Tallinn. From 1976 until 1999 and again since 2001, he has been employed at the Ugala Theatre. From 1999 until 2001, he worked at the Kuressaare Town Theatre. Besides theatre roles he has played also in several films and television series.

== Filmography ==
- 2016 Mother
- 2019 Tõde ja õigus
- 2019 Ükssarvik
