= Meelis Rämmeld =

Estonian actor (born 1975)

Meelis Rämmeld (born 4 April 1975) is an Estonian actor.

Rämmeld was born in Tallinn. In 1997 he graduated from Viljandi Culture Academy Theatre Department. After graduating he worked in Ugala Theatre. Since 2015 he is working at Endla Theatre. Besides theatre roles he has played also in several films and television series.

In early summer 2016, Rämmeld married actress Kadri Adamson. In 2017, the couple had a daughter.

== Filmography ==
- 2004: Stiilipidu (feature film; role: Andres)
- 2016: Polaarpoiss (feature film; role: Mattias' lawyer)
- 2013: Free Range: Ballaad maailma heakskiitmisest (feature film; role: Susanna's father)
- 2017: November (feature film; role: Jaan)
- 2018: Eia jõulud Tondikakul (feature film; role: tractorist Pets)
- 2018: Põrgu Jaan (feature film; role: Jaan)
- 2018: Portugal (feature film; role: Karl)
- 2020: Maakohus (feature film; role: judge)
- 2020: Rain (feature film; role: Musa-Mart)
- 2020: On the Water (feature film; role: Fisherman)
- 2022: Kalev (feature film; role: Aggressive man in bar)
- 2023: Suvitajad (feature film; role: Johan)
- 2024: Biwa järve 8 nägu (feature film; role: Andrei)
- 2024: Vari (feature film; role: Madjus)
