= Epp Eespäev =

Estonian actress

Epp Eespäev (born 25 October 1961) is an Estonian actress.

Eespäev was born in Võru. In 1988 she graduated from Tallinn State Conservatory. Since 1988 she has been working at Tallinn City Theatre.

Eespäev was previously married to actor and politician Artur Talvik. The couple have two children, a son and a daughter.

Awards:

- 1987: Voldemar Panso prize
- 1996: Ants Lauter Award

== Selected filmography ==
- 1992 Daam autos (feature film; role: Daam)
- 1993 Suflöör (feature film; role: Melissa)
- 1994 Tulivesi (feature film; role: Hilda)
- 2003-2004 Kodu keset linna (television series; role: Marju)
- 2011 Ainult meie kolm (feature film; role: Regina)
- 2014 Zero Point (film)|Nullpunkt (feature film; role: Johannes' mother)
- 2018 Võta või jäta (feature film; role: Evi, Erik's mother)
- 2022 Soo (feature film; role: Metskassi ema)
