= Kaido Veermäe =

Estonian actor and film director

Kaido Veermäe (born on 1 November 1971) is an Estonian actor and film director.

Veermäe was born in Tallinn. In 1996 he graduated from Estonian Academy of Music and Theatre's performing arts department. From 1996 until 1997 he was an actor at Vanalinnastuudio. Since 2002 he is a director at the film studio Rudolf Konimois Film.

Awards:

- 1995: Voldemar Panso prize

== Filmography ==
- 1995: Wikmani poisid (television series)
- 2002: Agent Sinikael (feature film; role: Solicitor)
- 2004: Sigade revolutsioon (feature film; producer; in the role: Commander)
- 2008: Tuulepealne maa (television series, role: Rein Salusoo)
- 2010–2012: Kodu keset linna (television series, role: Paul)
- 2011: Idioot (feature film; role: Ganja)
- 2024: Tulnukas 2 ehk Valdise tagasitulek 17 osas (feature film; role: Mardo)
