= Taavi Teplenkov =

Estonian actor (born 1975)

Taavi Teplenkov (born 2 May 1975) is an Estonian actor.

Teplenkov was born in Tallinn. Since 1998 he works at Estonian Drama Theatre. Besides theatrical roles he has also played on several films and television series.

== Roles ==
=== Selected film roles ===
- Must veri (2002)
- Detsembrikuumus (2008)
- Püha Tõnu kiusamine (2009)
- Punane elavhõbe (2010)
- Taevalaul (2010)
- Rotilõks (2011)
- Vasaku jala reede (2012)
- Nullpunkt (2014)
- Taevatrepp (2023)

=== Television roles ===
- Pehmed ja karvased (2003–)
- Õnne 13 (2004)
- Riigimehed (2010)
- Heeringas Veenuse õlal (2011)
- Mustad lesed (2015)
- Hetk ajaloos (2018)
