= Egon Nuter =

Estonian actor (born 1955)

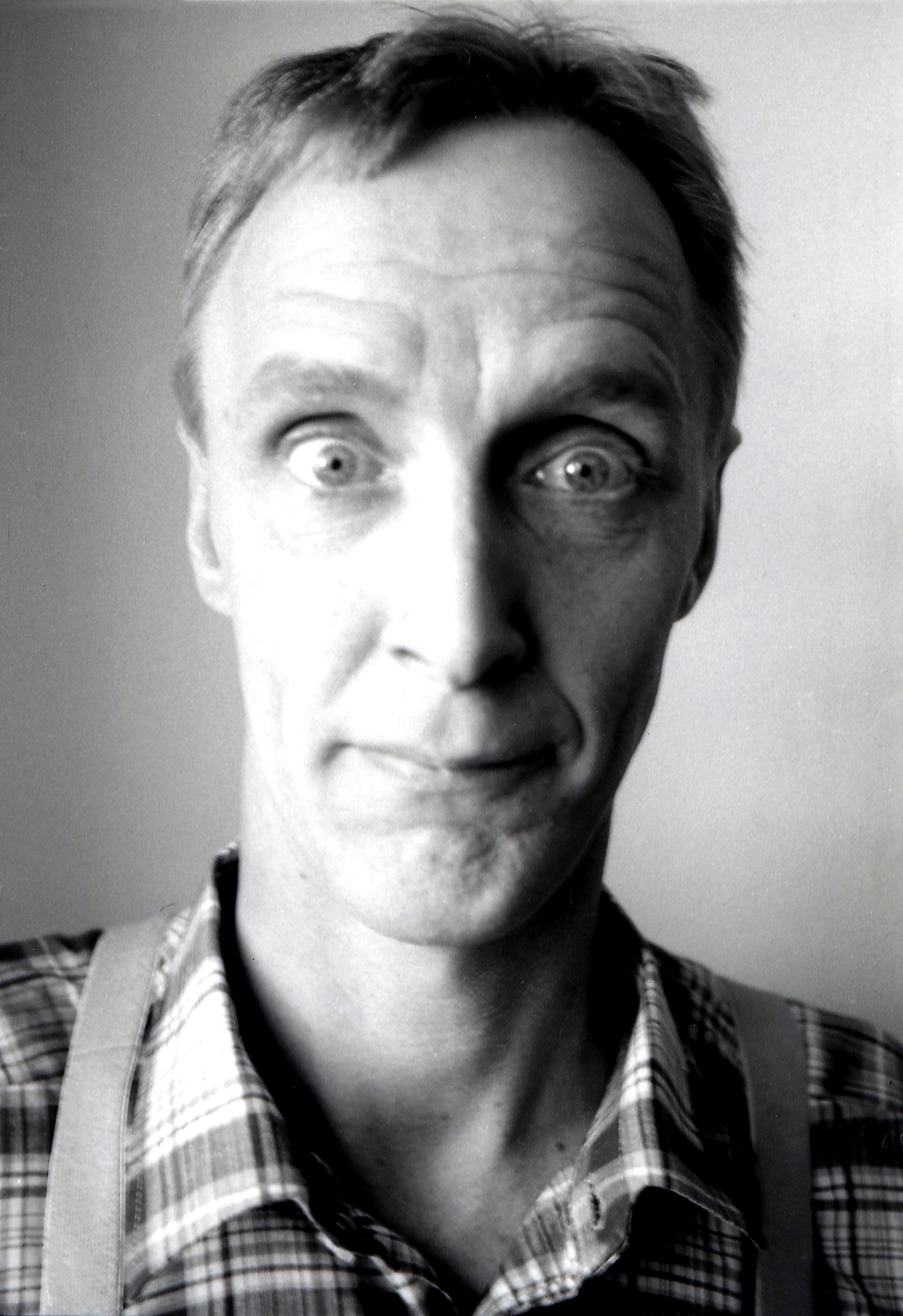
Nuter in 1993

Egon Nuter (born 23 September 1955) is an Estonian actor.

Nuter was born in Tallinn. In 1980, he graduated from Tallinn Pedagogical Institute in stage managing speciality. From 1980 until 2002, he worked at the Vanalinnastuudio. Since 2019, he has been an actor at the Tallinn City Theatre. Besides theatre roles, he has played also in several films.

== Filmography ==
- 1983: Nipernaadi
- 1984: Hundiseaduse aegu
- 1991: Surmatants
- 1996: Õnne 13
- 1997: Minu Leninid
- 1998: Kallis härra Q
- 2008: Tuulepealne maa
- 2010: Lumekuninganna
- 2010: Ühikarotid
- 2013: Elavad pildid
- 2016: Drömspel: Dream Game
- 2017: Green Cats
- 2018: Põrgu Jaan
- 2018: Võta või jäta
- 2019: ENSV
- 2019: Lotte ja kadunud lohed (animated film; in the role Kalmer (voice))
- 2019: Dora Who Came from Highway
- 2020: Asjad, millest me ei räägi
- 2020: Julius (short film)
- 2022: Kiik, Kirves ja Igavese Armastuse Puu
- 2022: Mieheni vaimo
- 2023: Estonia
- 2023: Tume paradiis
