= Jaak Kilmi =

Estonian filmmaker (born 1973)

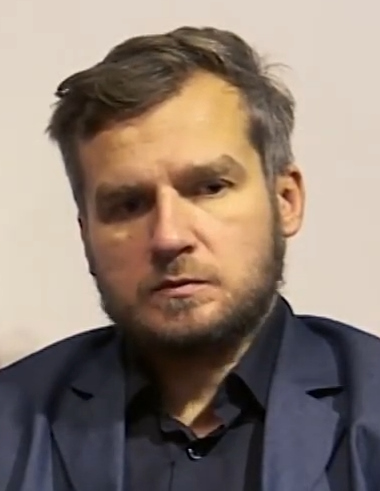
Jaak Kilmi in 2018

Jaak Kilmi (born 23 October 1973 in Tallinn) is an Estonian film director, screenwriter and producer.

In 1998 he graduated from Tallinn Pedagogical University's film school. Since 2001, Kilmi has been teaching documentary studies to scenography students at the Estonian Academy of Arts.

== Selected filmography ==
- Külla tuli (1997)
- Revolution of Pigs (2004)
- Disco and Atomic War (2009)
- The New World (2011, producer)
- The Dissidents (2017)
- Jõulud džunglis (2020)
