= Kaie Mihkelson =

Estonian actress

- Born: 12 October 1948 (age 77); Pärnu, then part of Estonian SSR, Soviet Union
- Occupation: Actress
- Spouse: Jaan Rõõmussaar (m. 1974; div. 1981) Evald Hermaküla (m. 1988; died 2000)
- Partner: Madis Kalmet

Kaie Mihkelson (born 12 October 1948) is an Estonian film and stage Actor.

== Biography ==
=== Early life and education ===
Mihkelson was born in Pärnu, Estonia on 12 October 1948. She graduated from the Tallinn Polytechnical Institute of Economics in 1969 and the Tallinn State Conservatory (now, the Estonian Academy of Music and Theatre) in 1974.

=== Career ===
From 1974 until 1977, Mihkelson was engaged at the Endla Theatre in Pärnu before leaving for the Youth Theater in Tallinn from 1977 until 1988. Mihkelson has been with the Estonian Drama Theatre in Tallinn since 1988. She has also worked as a lecturer at her alma mater, the Estonian Academy of Music and Theatre. Mihkelson has appeared in a number of television and film roles.

=== Award ===
Mikhelson was awarded the Order of the White Star, IV Class in 2008.

== Filmography ==
- The Master of the Desert (1978) – Anna
- Nipernaadi (1983) – Inriid
- Karoliine hõbelõng (1984) – Werewolf
- Õnnelind flamingo (1986) – Leaanika
- Bande (1986) – Lee Wilshire
- Keskea rõõmud (1987) – Helena
- Varastatud kohtumine (1988) – Tiina Kuusberg
- Äratus (1989) – Woman
- Surmatants (1991) – Margareth
- Vana mees tahab koju (1991) – Inna Valter
- Hotell E (1992) – Jane
- Kuhu põgenevad hinged (2007) – Woman in the Church
- The Class (2007) – Director
- Kuraditõestus (2008) – Juula
- Letters to Angel (2010)
- Kertu (2013) – Doctor
- Sandra saab tööd (2021) – Tiina
- Taevatrepp (2023) – Uu's Mother
- Tume paradiis (2023) – Leida
