= Andres Lepik =

Estonian actor and theatre director

Andres Lepik (born 27 April 1957 in Haapsalu) is an Estonian actor and theatre director.

In 1982 he graduated from the Tallinn State Conservatory's Performing Arts Department. From 1982 until 1994 and from 1995 until 2000, he worked at Ugala Theatre (1995–1998 as its artistical manager). From 2000 until 2003, he worked at the Endla Theatre. Since 2004, he has been a freelance actor. Besides theatre roles he has played also in several films and on television.

Awards:

- 1991: Ants Lauter prize

== Filmography ==
- 1987: Tants aurukatla ümber
- 1982: Need vanad armastuskirjad
- 2015: Vehkleja
- 2017: Mehetapja/Süütu/Vari
- 2018: Põrgu Jaan
- 2019: Johannes Pääsukese tõeline elu
- 2019: Tõde ja õigus
- 2020: Vee peal
- 2022: Erik Kivisüda
