= Peeter Tammearu =

Estonian actor (born 1964)

Peeter Tammearu (born 31 July 1964 in Pärnu) is an Estonian actor.

In 1986 he graduated from the performing arts department of the Tallinn State Conservatory.

2003–2009 he was the director of Ugala Theater. Since 2014 he is an actor and director in Kuressaare Linnateater.

== Selected filmography ==
- Revolution of Pigs (2004)
- August 1991 (2005)
- Meeletu (2006)
- Lotte from Gadgetville (2006)
- Deemonid (2012)
- Seenelkäik (2012)
- Kertu (2013)
- 1944 (2015)
- Truth and Justice (2019)
- Lotte ja kadunud lohed (2019)
- Sandra saab tööd (2021)
- 8 Views of Lake Biwa (2024)
- Vari (2024)
- Must auk (2024)
- Ühemõõtmeline mees (2025)
