= Free Range (film) =

2013 film

- Film poster
- Directed by: Veiko Õunpuu
- Written by: Robert Kurvitz; Veiko Õunpuu
- Produced by: Katrin Kissa
- Starring: Lauri Lagle; Jaanika Arum; Peeter Volkonski; Roman Baskin
- Release date: 19 September 2013
- Running time: 102 minutes
- Country: Estonia
- Language: Estonian

Free Range (Estonian: Free Range: Ballaad maailma heakskiitmisest) is a 2013 Estonian drama film directed by Veiko Õunpuu. The film was selected as the Estonian entry for the Best Foreign Language Film at the 86th Academy Awards, but it was not nominated.

== Cast ==
- Lauri Lagle as Fred
- Jaanika Arum as Susanna
- Laura Peterson as Traitor to the fatherland
- Peeter Volkonski as Fred's father
- Roman Baskin as Susanna's father
- Rita Raave as Susanna's mother
- Meelis Rämmeld as Susanna's father
- Jan Uuspõld as Colleague
- Anne Türnpu as Colleague
- Loore Martma as Student
- Marion Undusk as Student
- Mari Abel as Secretary
- Laine Mägi as Trolley driver
- Lauri Kaldoja as Friend
- Jim Ashilevi as Friend
- Liis Lindmaa as Friend
- Markus Luik as Friend
- Ivo Reinok as Friend
- Triin Ruumet as Friend
- Jass Seljamaa as Friend
- Reginleif Trubetsky as Friend

== See also ==
- List of submissions to the 86th Academy Awards for Best Foreign Language Film
- List of Estonian submissions for the Academy Award for Best Foreign Language Film
