= Riina Maidre =

Estonian actress (born 1982)

Riina Maidre (born 26 January 1982) is an Estonian actress.

Maidre was born in Tallinn. She has studied at Estonian Academy of Music and Theatre's Drama School and has worked at Estonian Drama Theatre and Von Krahl Theatre. Besides theatrical roles she has also played on several films and television series.

== Selected filmography ==
- 2005 Sagedused (role: Liina)
- 2007 Georg (role: Theatre make-up artist)
- 2007 Mis iganes, Aleksander! (role: Liisi)
- 2008 Taarka (role: Tato)
- 2008 Käsky (role: Beata Hallenberg)
- 2008 Taarka (role: Tato)
- 2011 Kõik muusikud on kaabakad (role: Leila)
- 2017-2018 Siberi võmm (role: Liki Erelt)
- 2022 Apteeker Melchior. Viirastus (role: Odele)
- 2026 Midagi tõelist (role: Raina)
