= Margus Prangel =

Estonian actor

Margus Prangel (born 7 July 1974 in Tallinn) is an Estonian actor.

In 2000 he graduated from the Estonian Academy of Music and Theatre. From 2000 until 2011, he worked at the Estonian Drama Theatre. Since 2011, he has been a freelancer actor. Besides theatre roles he has also appeared in films and television series.

== Filmography ==
- 2001: Head käed
- 2004: Täna öösel me ei maga
- 2006: The Power of Fear
- 2007: Klass
- 2008: Mina olin siin
- 2016: Päevad, mis ajasid segadusse
- 2017: Heleni sünnipäev
- 2017: November
- 2019: ENSV
- 2019: Tõde ja õigus
- 2021: Firebird
- 2022: Apteeker Melchior. Timuka tütar
