= Moonika Siimets =

Estonian film director

Moonika Siimets (born 7 May 1980) is an Estonian film director who has directed award-winning documentaries, television series and short films. In 2010, she received the Cultural Endowment of Estonia for World Champion and Trendy Dog. Her first feature film The Little Comrade (Seltsimees laps) remained the top film in Estonia for five weeks, attracting 100,000 viewers.

== Biography ==
Born on 7 May 1980 in Tartu, Moonika Siimets matriculated from the Forselius High School in 1999 and went on to study Estonian literature and folklore at the University of Tartu. From 2002, she studied at the Department of Audiovisual Art at Tallinn University, majoring in directing in 2006. In parallel, she attended classes at the University of Central Lancashire under the Erasmus Programme. She completed her studies in Los Angeles at the Judith Weston Studios.

From 2004, Siimets worked on a number of documentary films at Estonian Television and directed the series Selgeltnägijate tuleproov (Psychic Challenge) in 2008. Her documentaries include Report: Green Estonia (2007), World Champion (2009), Trendy Dog (2010), Another Dimension (2012), Is It You? (Stockholm Film Festival 2013) and Pink Cardigan (2014).

The Little Comrade, her first feature film, was presented at the Busan International Film Festival in 2018, receiving the BNK Busan Bank Award. It was later screened at the Tallinn Black Nights Film Festival.
