= The Dissidents =

2017 film directed by Jaak Kilmi

- Directed by: Jaak Kilmi
- Written by: Martin Algus
- Produced by: Kristian Taska (Taska Film)
- Starring: Märt Pius; Karl-Andreas Kalmet; Veiko Porkanen
- Cinematography: Aigars Sērmukšs
- Music by: Samuli Erkkilä, Joni Suhonen
- Release date: 17 February 2017
- Running time: 1h 30min
- Country: Estonia
- Language: Estonian

The Dissidents (Estonian: Sangarid) is a 2017 Estonian comedy-action film directed by Jaak Kilmi. The film is about three young men escaping from Soviet Estonia to Sweden via Finland in the 1980s.

== Cast ==
- Märt Pius - Ralf
- Karl-Andreas Kalmet - Mario / Speculator
- Veiko Porkanen - Einar / Meathead
- Esko Salminen - Lars-Jukka Lampinen
- Julia Berngardt – Rita
- Henrik Kalmet - Mario's brother
- Tõnu Kark - Grandfather
- Ott Sepp - Hillbilly
- Kristjan Lüüs - Hillbilly
