= Reimo Sagor =

Estonian actor

- Born: May 14, 1987 (age 39); Lääne-Nigula Parish, then part of Estonian SSR, Soviet Union
- Occupation: Actor
- Years active: 2014 - present

Reimo Sagor (born 14 May 1987 in Lääne-Nigula Parish) is an Estonian actor.

In 2014, he graduated from the Estonian Academy of Music and Theatre's Stage Art department. Since 2014, he is working at the Vanemuine theatre in Tartu. Intermittently, he has worked also at NO99 Theatre. Besides theatre roles, he has also played in several films.

== Filmography ==
=== Film ===
Year	Title	Role	Notes
2014	Mai	Mees	Short film.
2014	Zero Point (Nullpunkt)	Bert	
2015	Ghost Mountaineer (Must Alpinist)	Olle	
2016	The Days That Confused (Päevad, mis ajasid segadusse)	Toomas	
2017	Taatsa Side	Siim	Short film.
2018	Take It or Leave It (Võta või jäta)	Erik	
2019	Scandivanian Silence (Skandinaavia vaikus)	He	
2022	Tagurpidi Torn	Olav	
2022	Kalev	Aivar Kuusmaa	
2023	Dark Paradise (Tume paradiis)	Tolik	

=== Television ===
Year	Title	Role	Notes
2020	Agent Hamilton	Mykhailo 'Mike' Tyraschenko	5 episodes.
2021	Max Anger - With One Eye Open	Sergej Domasjov	4 episodes.
2018-24	Alo	Erki	21 episodes.
