= Vali kord =

2004 film directed by Andres Maimik

- Directed by: Andres Maimik
- Produced by: Andres Maimik, Rain Tolk, Juhan Ulfsak, Priit Aus
- Production company: Kuukulgur Film
- Release date: 2004
- Country: Estonia
- Language: Estonian

Vali kord is a 2004 Estonian documentary film directed by Andres Maimik.

Awards:

- 2004: Riga International Film Festival, program: Forum 2004 - Magical Crystal
- 2005: Ismailia International Film Festival for Documentary and Short Films (Egypt), best documentary film, and FIPRESCI prize
- 2005: Estonian Film Journalists' Association's award: Neitsi Maali award (best film of the year)

== Cast ==
- Rain Tolk - Tolk
- Ken Saan - Ken
