= Hannes Kaljujärv =

Estonian actor (born 1957)

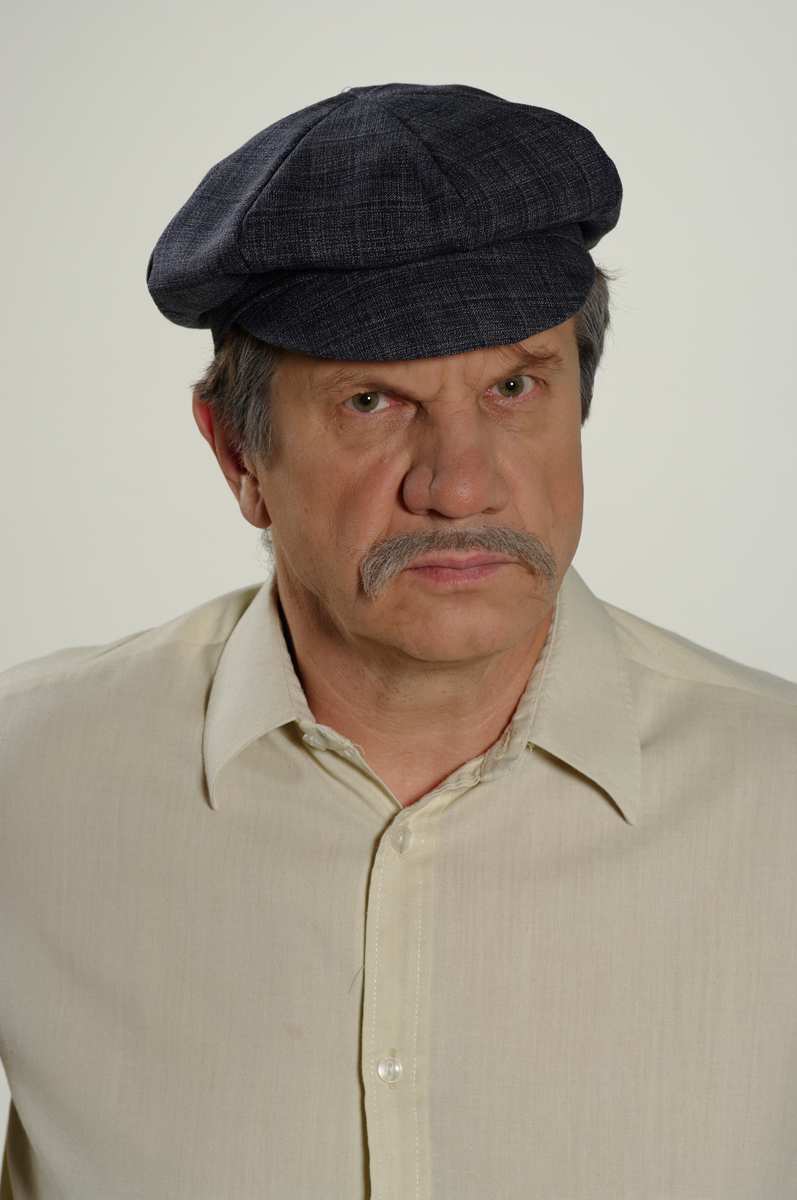
Hannes Kaljujärv in 2013

Hannes Kaljujärv (born 4 January 1957 in Tartu) is an Estonian actor.

In 1979 he graduated from the University of Tartu with a degree in physical education (Estonian: kehakultuuriteaduskond). In 1979 he also finished courses with Evald Hermaküla's Vanemuine study studio. Since 1979 he has worked at the Vanemuine theatre. In addition to stage roles, he has also appeared in several films.

In 2013 he was awarded the Order of the White Star, Fourth Class. His son is the actor Rasmus Kaljujärv.

== Selected filmography ==
- 1989: Äratus (feature film; role: Komsorg)
- 1988: Varastatud kohtumine (feature film; role: Marta's son)
- 2002: Nimed marmortahvlil (feature film; role: militia unit leader)
- 2005: Stiilipidu (feature film; role: Kalev)
- 2006: Vana daami visiit (feature film; role: citizen)
- 2009: Püha Tõnu kiusamine (feature film; role: visitor at the bar)
- 2011: Lotte ja kuukivi saladus (animated film; roles: Leo the seal (voice) and Hannes the snow lion (voice))
- 2019: Lotte ja kadunud lohed (animated film; role: Aksel (voice))
