= Veikko Täär =

Estonian actor, sport psychologist, athlete, educator, and entrepreneur

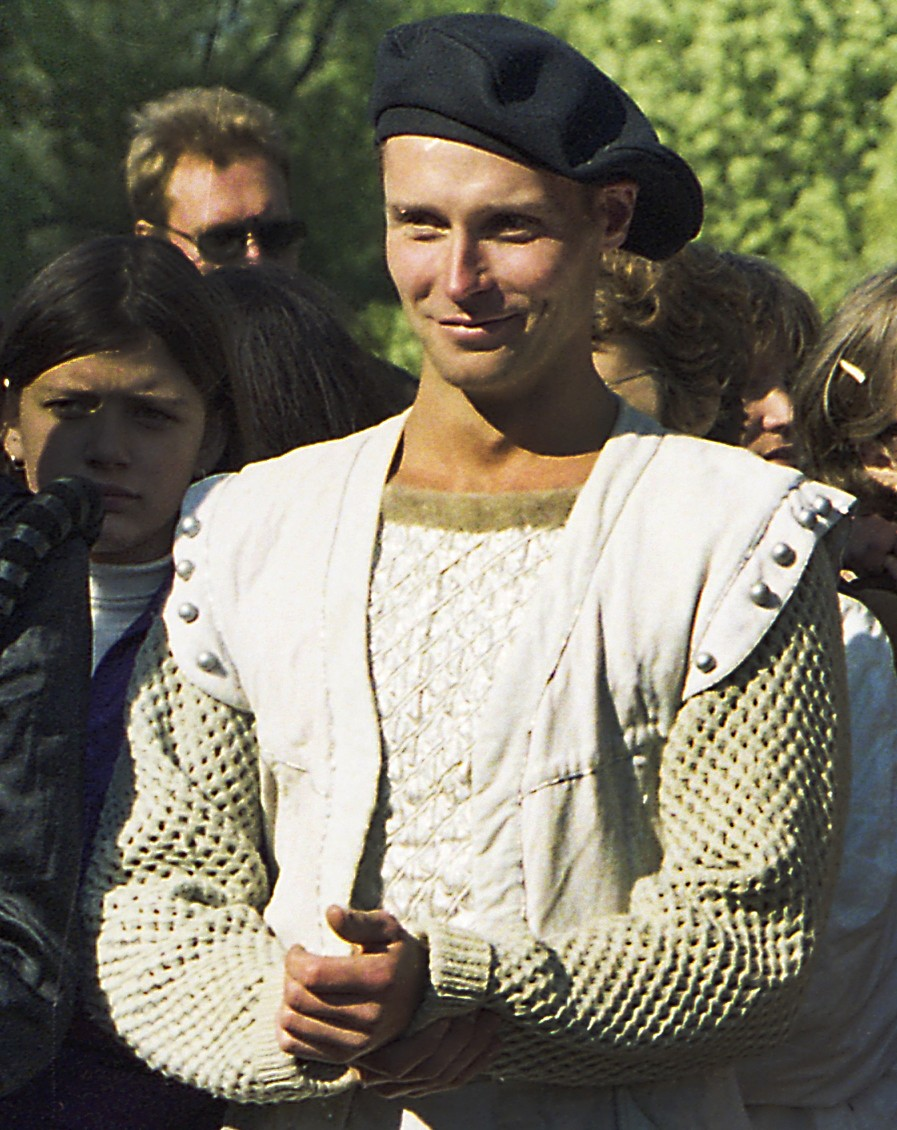
Veikko Täär, 1998

Veikko Täär (born 7 September 1971) is an Estonian actor, sport psychologist, athlete, educator and entrepreneur.

Täär was born in Tartu and graduated from Tartu 10th Secondary School in 1989. From 1989 until 1991, he studied physics at the University of Tartu, before enrolling at the Estonian Academy of Music and Theatre to study acting, graduating cum laude in 1998. After graduation, he performed in productions at the Estonian Drama Theatre, Vanemuine, Ugala and several other theatres and is a freelance actor. Besides theatre roles he has played also in several films and television series and hosted several television sports programmes.

Täär is a successful amateur athlete (ski marathons, triathlons, etc.) and was the owner of the Otepää café l.u.m.i.

== Awards ==
- 1996: Voldemar Panso Prize

== Filmography ==
- 1993: Õnne 13 (television series, role: Raivo Tiik)
- 1998: Pall vastu seina (feature film, role: Einar)
- 2004: Täna öösel me ei maga (feature film, role: Leo)
- 2006: Kuldrannake (feature film, role: Allan)
- 2011: Kormoranid ehk nahkpükse ei pesta (feature film, role: Photographer)
- 2015: Keeris (television series, role: Kain Teebel)
- 2016―2018: Siberi võmm (television series, role: Viktor Korol)
- 2016: Õnn tuleb magades (feature film, role: Kaupo)
- 2017: Lotte lood (television series, role: Mati, Bruno's father)
- 2019: ENSV (television series, role: Kestutis)
- 2019: Mehed (feature film, role: Veikko)
- 2021: Vaga vesi (television series, role: Riho)
