= Aarne Soro =

Estonian actor (born 1974)

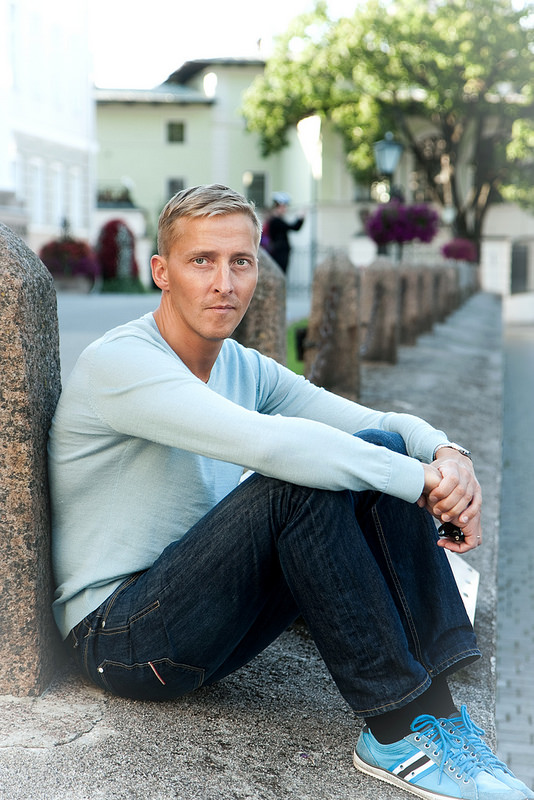
Aarne Soro in 2012

Aarne Soro (born 3 February 1974) is an Estonian actor.

Soro was born in Tõrva. In 1997 he graduated from the Viljandi Culture Academy. Since 1996 he has been working at the Ugala Theatre in Viljandi. Besides stage roles he has also participated on films and television series.

== Awards ==
- 2019: (Estonian: Hea Teatri Auhind) ('Good Theatre Prize')

== Filmography ==
- Head käed (2001)
- Helmut (2001)
- Vanad ja kobedad saavad jalad alla (2003)
- Stiilipidu (2005)
- Zen läbi prügi (2007)
- Georg (2007)
- Detsembrikuumus (2008)
- Kartulid ja apelsinid (2013-2014, television series)
- Naabriplika (2013–2019, television series)
- Seltsimees laps (2018)
- Elu Hammasratastel (2018)
- Vee peal (2020)
- Taevatrepp (2023)
- Must auk (2024)

== Personal life ==
Soro is married to Silvia Soro, an actress and director, and they have two daughters, Herta (2002) and Marta (2006), and a son, Artur (2015). His sister is the musician Anne Loho.
