= Good Hands (film) =

2001 film by Peeter Simm

- Directed by: Peeter Simm
- Produced by: Artur Talvik, Gatis Upmalis
- Production companies: Allfilm, Studio F.O.R.M.A. (Latvia)
- Release date: 2001
- Countries: Estonia, Latvia
- Languages: Estonian, Latvian, Russian

Good Hands (Estonian: Head käed, Latvian: Labās rokas) is a 2001 Estonian–Latvian comedy and crime film directed by Peeter Simm and based on the novel Arnold by Toomas Raudam.

== Cast ==
- Rēzija Kalniņa as Margita
- Lembit Ulfsak as Adolf
- Tõnu Kark as Dr. Lepik
- Tiit Sukk as Arnold
- Atis Tenbergs as Pavo
- Maija Apine as Oksana
- Leonarda Kļaviņa as Evija
- Gert Raudsep as Indrek
- Regnārs Vaivars as Arturs
- Lauri Nebel as Peeter
- Aleksander Okunev as Truck Driver
- Kristel Elling as Lady on TV Show
- Laine Mägi as Show Hostess
- Margus Prangel as Archie
- Janek Joost as Wello
- Elina Reinold as Nurse
- Aarne Soro as Border Guard
- Dainis Gadelis as Police Officer in Latvia
- Uldis Dumpis as Doctor
- Linda Skaistlauka
- Svetlana Bless
- Aksels Ilmārs Ozoliņš

== Accolades ==
Awards:

- 2001: KINOSHOCK - Open Film Festival for states of the CIS and Estonia, Latvia and Lithuania (Anapa, Russia), 2001, Grand Prix
- 2001: The National Film Festival Lielais Kristaps (Latvia), best film director (Peeter Simm), best actor (Rēzija Kalniņa), best screenwriting (Toomas Raudam, Peeter Simm)
- 2002: Lecce European Film Festival (Italy), Grand Prix, best screenwriting (Toomas Raudam, Peeter Simm)
