= Urmas Eero Liiv =

Estonian film and television director

Urmas Eero Liiv (born 17 November 1966, in Tõstamaa, Pärnu County) is an Estonian film and television director.

2001-2012 he was the creative leader (Estonian: loovjuht) of the television channel Kanal 2. Since 2021 he is the creative leader of TV3's television channels.

== Filmography ==
- "Must alpinist" 2015 (feature film)
- "Kiirtee põrgusse" 2019 (feature film)
- "Mimikri" 1999 (documentary film)
- "Inimene kadus" 2000 (documentary film)
- "Teine Arnold" 2002 (documentary film)
- "Kaali saladus" 2003 (documentary film)
- "Palju õnne!" 2004 (documentary film)
- "Casting" 2006 (documentary film)
- "Tervitusi Nõukogude Eestist!" 2007 (documentary film)
- "Pronksöö: vene mäss Tallinnas" 2007 (documentary film)
- "Staarmaakas" 2010 (documentary film)
- "Häädemeeste UFO" 2010 (documentary film)
