= Mari Abel =

Estonian actress (born 1975)

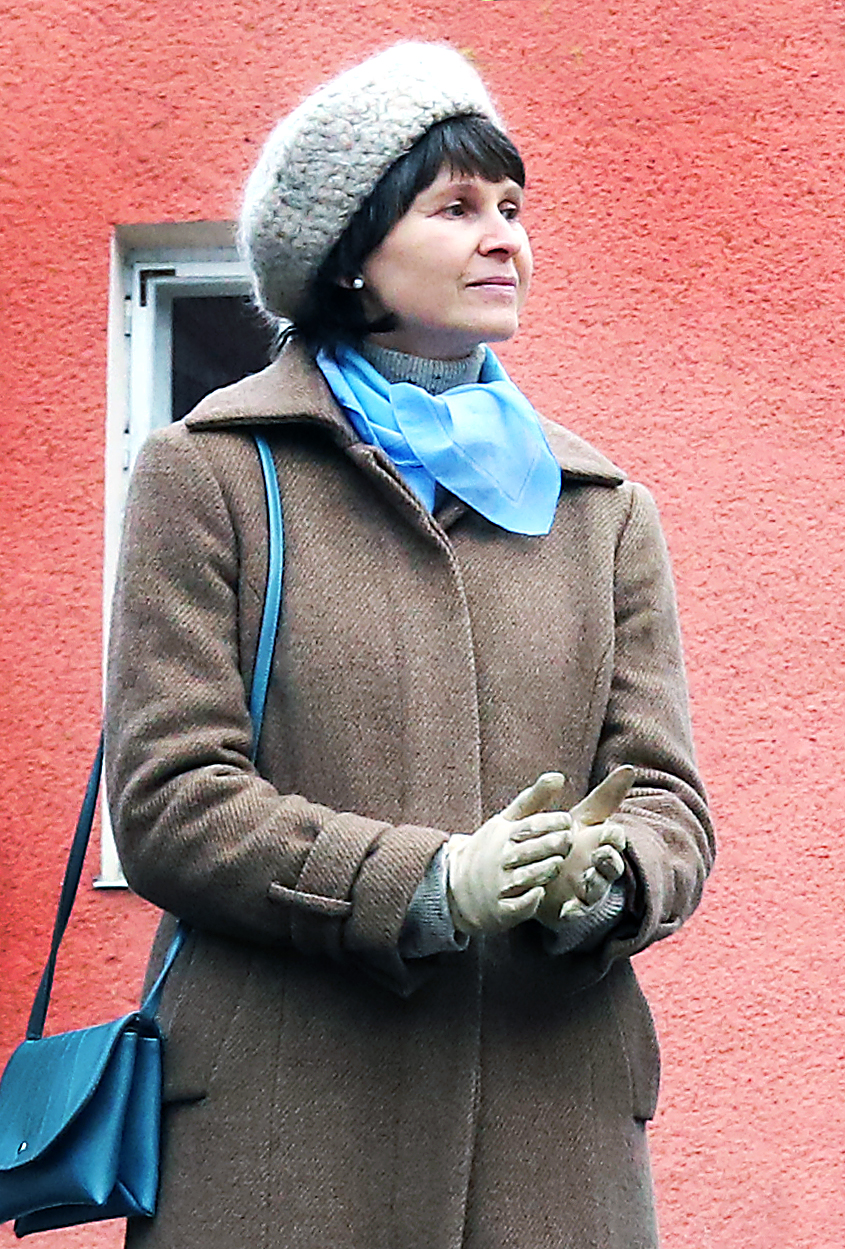
Mari Abel in 2024

Mari Abel (born 14 January 1975, age 51) is an Estonian actress.

She was born in Rapla, a small town in northern Estonia. Little is publicly available regarding her early life.

In 2004, she graduated from the Estonian Academy of Music and Theatre and started working as an actress at the Von Krahl Theatre. She later became a freelance actress. Besides various roles in theatre, she has additionally acted in several films and on television.

== Filmography ==
| Year | Movie(s) | Role |
|---|---|---|
| 2006 | Uncaught Miracle | Lilli |
| 2010 | Shift | Miina |
| 2013 | The Arbiter Free Range | Judge Secretary |
| 2014 | Zero Point | Ege |
| 2016 | The Spy and The Poet Delusion | Siiri |
| 2017 | November | Liina's Mother's Ghost |
| 2018 | FRESH BLOOD: Own and Stranger | Helen |
| 2021 | Sandra Gets a Job County Court The Diary of Vaino Vahing | Sandra Mother Actor |
| 2023 | Skin of a Mandarin The Invisible Fight | Unknown Zinaida |
| 2026 | Our Erika Mind ei ole sinuta | Ruth Unknown |
