= Mushrooming (film) =

2012 film

- Directed by: Toomas Hussar
- Written by: Toomas Hussar
- Produced by: Piret Tibbo-Hudgins
- Starring: Hendrik Toompere Jr. Jr.
- Cinematography: Rein Kotov
- Release date: 21 September 2012
- Running time: 93 minutes
- Country: Estonia
- Language: Estonian

Mushrooming (Estonian: Seenelkäik) is a 2012 Estonian comedy film directed by Toomas Hussar. The film was selected as the Estonian entry for the Best Foreign Language Oscar at the 85th Academy Awards, but it did not make the final shortlist.

== Cast ==
- Hendrik Toompere Jr. Jr. as Villu Koobalt
- Hilje Murel as Silvi Säinas
- Elina Reinold as Viivi Kägu
- Üllar Saaremäe as Local redneck
- Raivo E. Tamm as Aadu Kägu
- Juhan Ulfsak as Zäk
- Ott Sepp as Sibi
- Volli Käro as Karl
- Ülle Kaljuste as Meikar
- Hannes Võrno as Ensign
- Peeter Tammearu as Segent

== See also ==
- List of submissions to the 85th Academy Awards for Best Foreign Language Film
- List of Estonian submissions for the Academy Award for Best Foreign Language Film
