= Raimo Jõerand =

Estonian film director and scenarist

Raimo Jõerand (born 15 July 1972 in Tallinn) is an Estonian documental film director and scenarist.

2003-2005 he worked at production company OÜ Eetriüksus, being the chief producer of feature films. 2006-2013 he worked at Estonian Film Foundation, being a film specialist.

== Filmography ==
- 2006 "Sinimäed" (documental film; director and scenarist)
- 2018 "Hetk ajaloos" (television series; director and scenarist)
- 2018 "Rodeo" (documental film; director and scenarist)
- 2019 "Ajakapslid" (documental film; director and scenarist)
- 2019 "Peep Puksi lugu" (documental film; director and scenarist)
- 2021 "Sea aasta" (documental film; director and operator)
