= Indrek Ojari =

Estonian actor

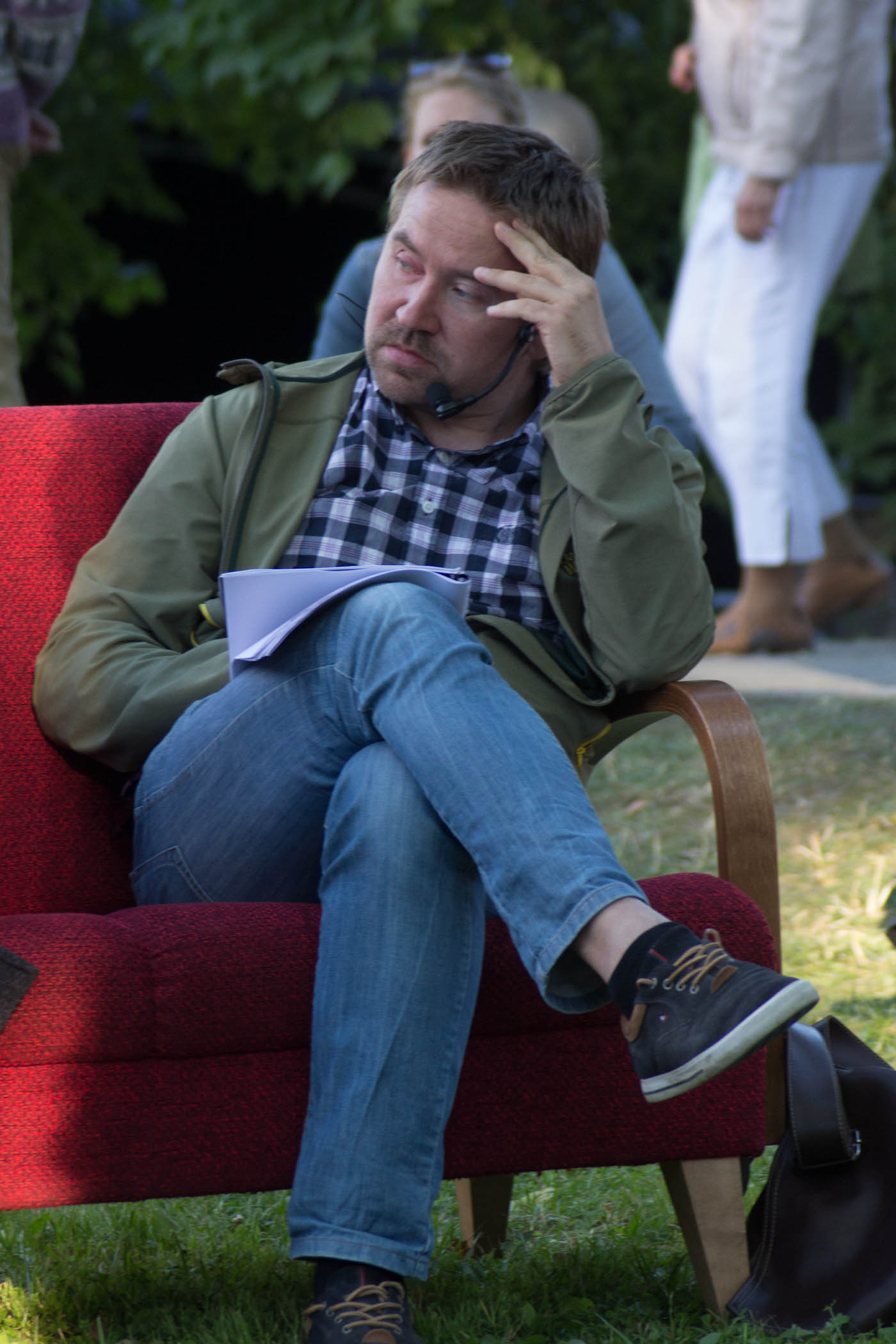
Indrek Ojari in 2015

Indrek Ojari (born 9 October 1977) is an Estonian actor.

Ojari was born in Tallinn. In 2000 he graduated from Estonian Academy of Music and Theatre. Since 2004 he is working at Tallinn City Theatre.

== Selected filmography ==
- 2002: Names in Marble (film) (Estonian: Nimed marmortahvlil, feature film; role (minor): Reinok)
- 2003–2008: Kodu keset linna (television series; role: Sten)
- 2011: IT-planeet (educational TV science fiction comedy; role: alien)
- 2018: Võta või jäta (feature film; role: Toomas)
- 2019: Vanamehe film (animated film; roles: lumberjack Indrek (voice) and rooster (voice))
- 2020: Rain (feature film; role: Rain)
- 2020: O2 (feature film; role: Andres Piirisild)
- 2021: Süü (television series; role: Detective Kaarma)
- 2024: Tulnukas 2 ehk Valdise tagasitulek 17 osas (feature film; role: Jarmo)

== Awards ==
- 2020: annual awards by Cultural Endowment of Estonia: Best Actor
- 2014 Ants Lauter Award: Actor Award
