= Andres Noormets =

Estonian theatre actor, director, and theatre pedagogue

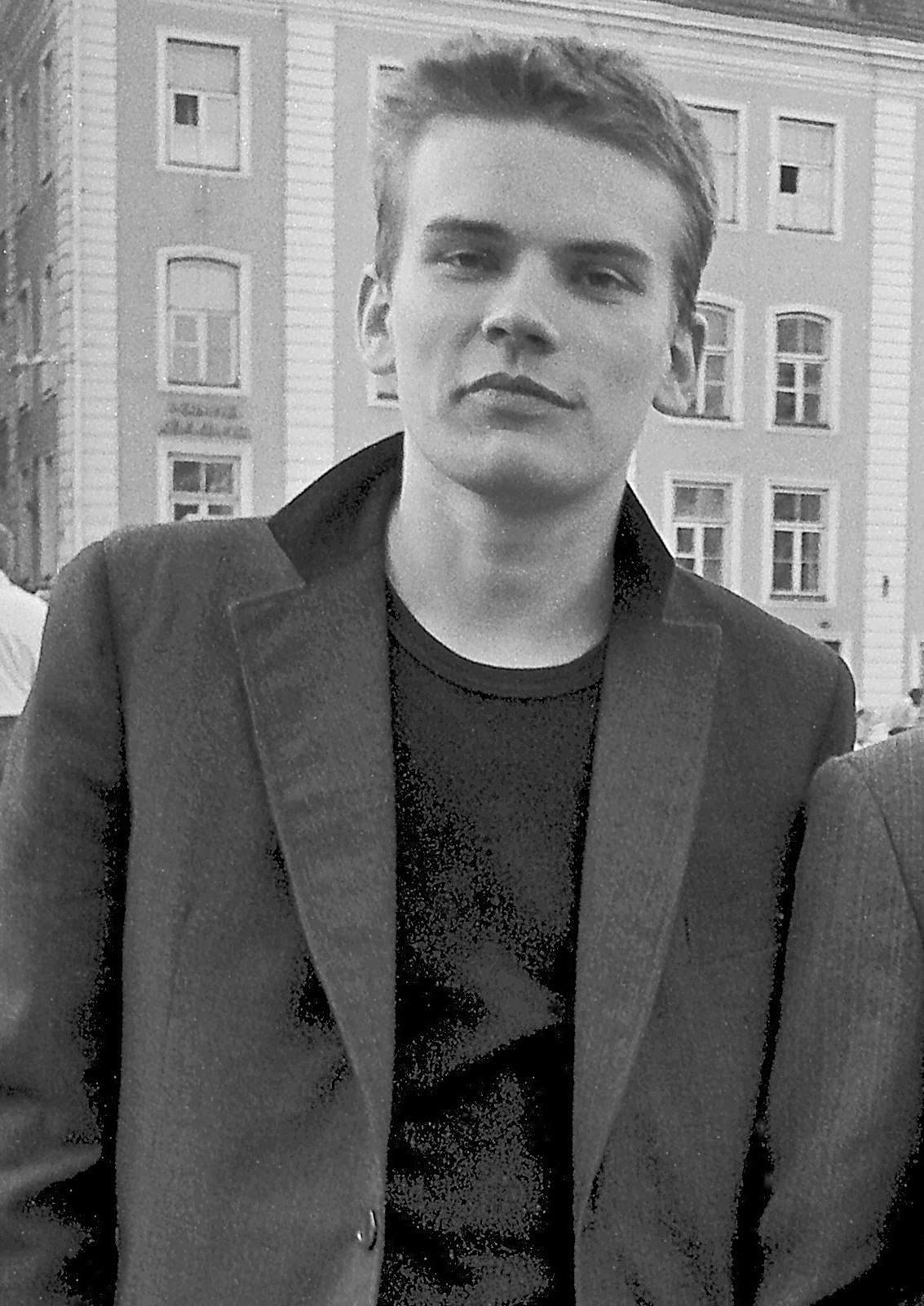
Andres Noormets in 1986

Andres Noormets (born 1 October 1963 in Paide) is an Estonian theatre actor, director and theatre pedagogue.

1988 he graduated from Tallinn State Conservatory Stage Art Department.

Besides theatre roles he has also played on several films and television series (e.g. Wikmani poisid, 1995).

In 2018 he was awarded with Order of the White Star, IV class.

== Staging works ==
- Unamuno' and Noormets' "Ühe kire lugu (1992)
- Wilde' and Noormets' "Dorian Gray portree" (1993)
- Rummo's "Valguse põik" (1993)
