= Aet Laigu =

Estonian film producer and director

Aet Laigu (pseudonym Al Wallcat) is an Estonian film producer and director. She frequently collaborates with Kadri Koussar, another Estonian director.

She has founded the Estonian production company Meteoriit.

== Filmography ==
- 2016 "Ema" (feature film; scenarist)
- 2018 "Tuliliilia" (feature film; producer, scenarist)
- 2019 "The Chuck Band Show ('Ühemeheshow') (feature film; director and scenarist)
