= Ilmar Taska =

Estonian film director and writer

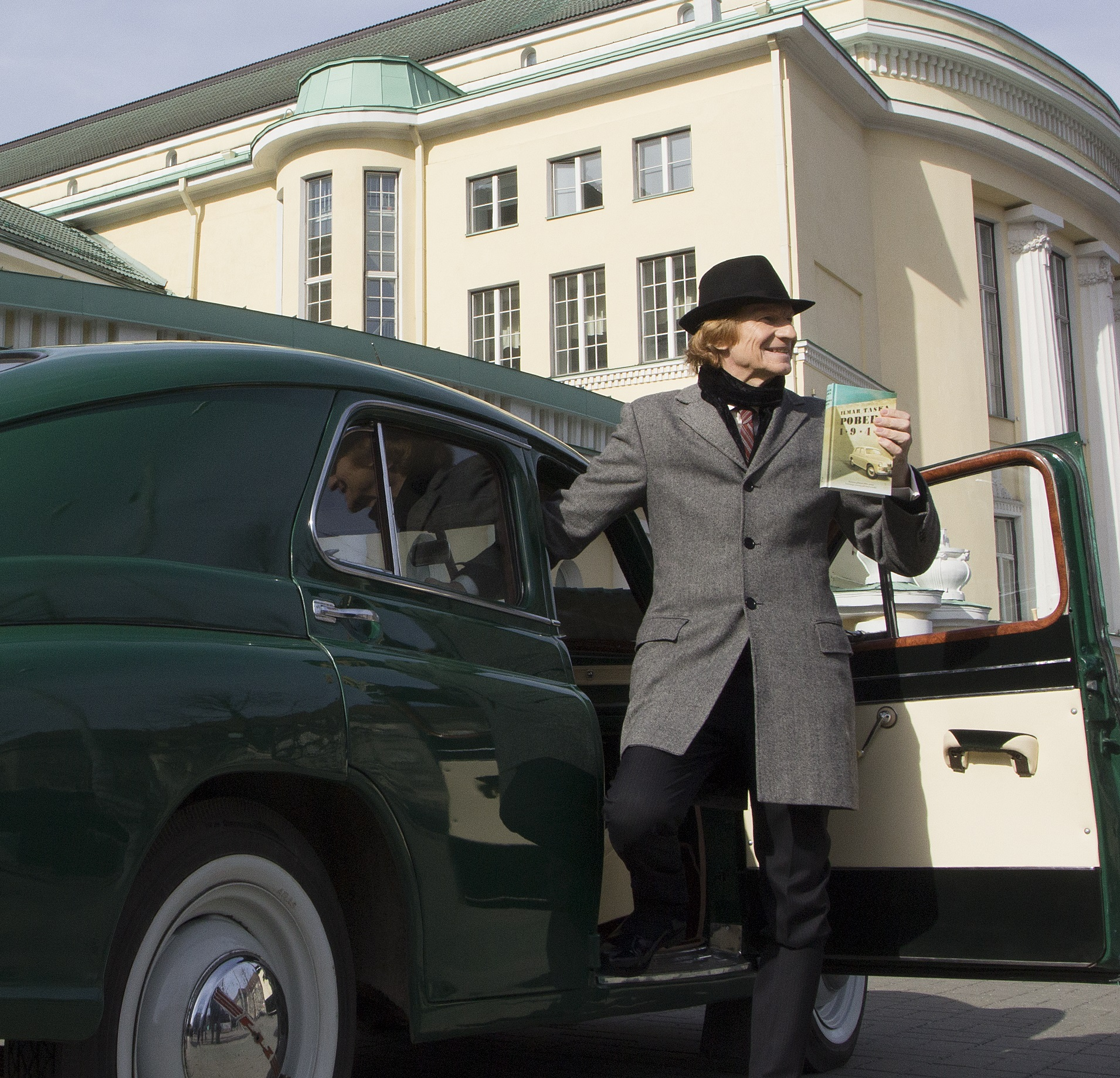
Ilmar Taska with his novel Pobeda 1946 next to a Pobeda

Ilmar Taska (born May 21, 1953, in Vyatka) is an Estonian filmmaker and writer, who was writer and producer for 20th Century Fox movie Back in the USSR (1992) and producer for Candles in the Dark directed by Maximilian Schell. Ilmar Taska's 2016 novel Pobeda 1946 has been translated into many languages and was nominated for the Jarl Hellemann Translation Prize in Finland as best translated book of the year (translated by Jouko Vanhanen).

Ilmar Taska was born in Russia, where his family had been sent from Estonia by Stalin's repressions before WW2. Ilmar Taska grew up and went to school in Estonia where he won a Noorte Hääl youth literary prize. Ilmar Taska graduated (MA) from Moscow Film Institute (VGIK).

Taska gained prominence as an international film and theatre figure working in Estonia, Sweden and the United States. He was one of the organisers of the American Soviet Entertainment Summit in Hollywood, Moscow and Rockefeller Estate and New York. Ilmar Taska founded Kanal 2, the first independent television network and still the market leader in Estonia.

In 2011 he made his debut into the literary world with an autobiographical novella Parem kui elu, (Better than Life), which was published in Denmark by Jensen & Dalgaard in 2017. In 2014 he won the annual literature prize in Estonia for his short story Pobeda, which formed the basis for his novel Pobeda 1946. His 2014 short story collection, Skönare än livet (More Beautiful than Life) was published in Sweden. A short story, Apartment for Rent, was included in the anthology Best European Fiction 2016, published by Dalkey Archive Press.

In 2016 his novel Pobeda 1946 (A Car Called Victory) was a critical success in Estonia. It topped Estonia's bestseller list of fiction for several months. It was published in Finnish by WSOY-Bonnier Books Finland; in German by Kommode Verlag; and in Lithuanian by Homo Liber in 2017. It was released in English by Norvik Press in 2018. His second novel, Elüüsiumi kutse (The Call of Elysium) was published in 2021.

Ilmar Taska's short stories have been translated into English, Swedish, Danish, Finnish, Latvian, Russian, Chinese and Bulgarian. Ilmar Taska is an Estonian writer considered international in terms of his work, his talent reaching beyond the boundaries of conventional writing.
