= Rain Rannu =

Estonian entrepreneur and film director

- Born: 2 April 1980 (age 46)
- Education: University of Tartu
- Occupations: Screenwriter, businessman

Rain Rannu (born 2 April 1980) is an Estonian screenwriter, movie director, investor and entrepreneur.

He is known as a serial entrepreneur, who is behind Fortumo, a mobile payments technology company sold to Boku in 2020, and a partner at investment fund Superangel. In 2016 he entered movie industry by releasing his first movie Chasing Ponies. In 2021 he released first private movie investment fund in Estonia. In 2024, he served as jury president of the New Flesh Competition for Best First Feature award ceremony at the 28th Fantasia International Film Festival.

== Filmography ==
Rain Rannu operates under indie film production company Tallifornia, co-founded by Rannu and Tõnu Hiielai in 2018. The company focuses exclusively on full length narrative features.

Year	Title
2016	Chasing Ponies
2018	Beqaa VR
2019	Chasing Unicorns
2022	Child Machine
2023	Free Money
2024	Infinite Summer
