= Maarja Jakobson =

Estonian actress

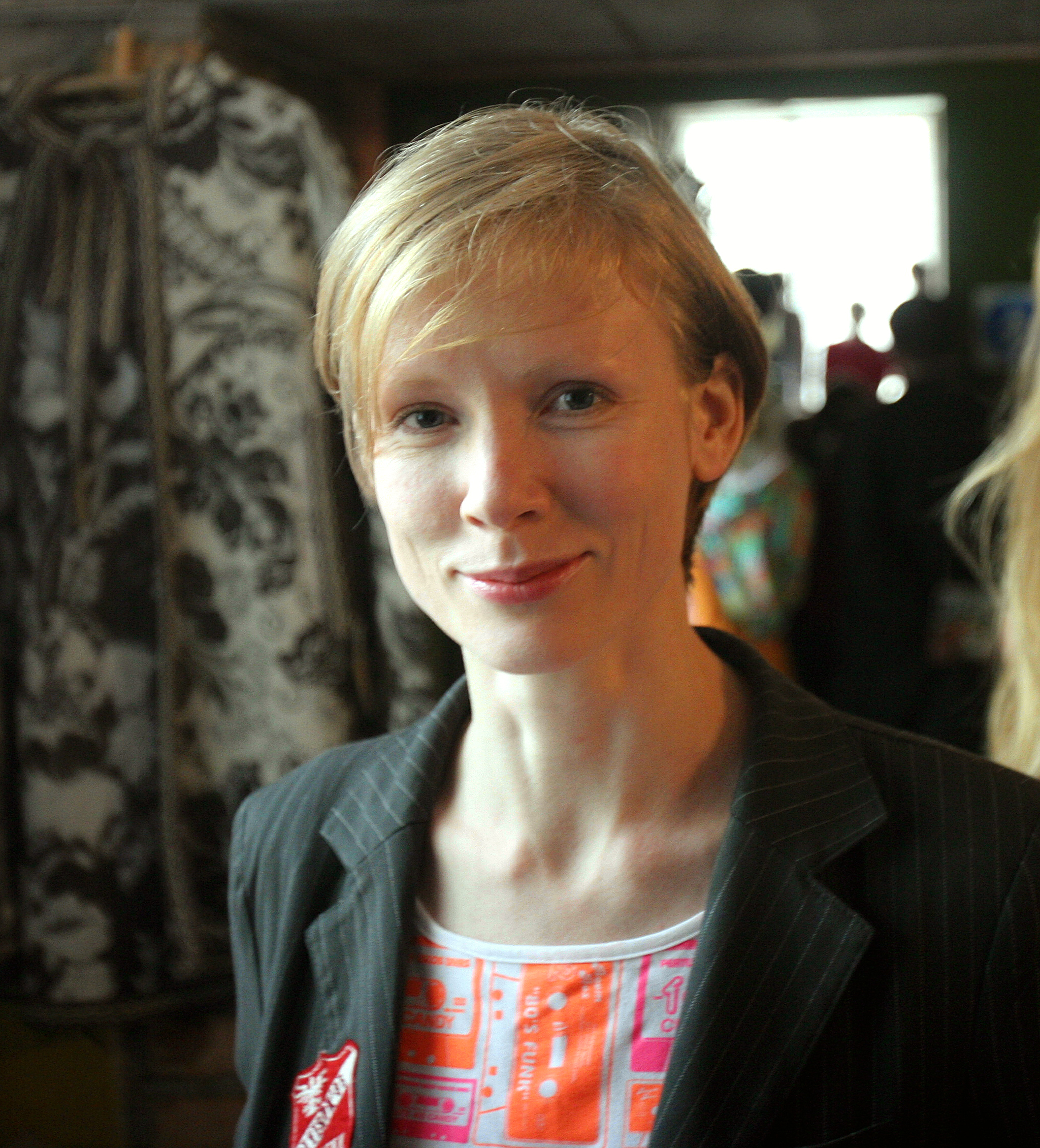
- Jakobson in 2009
- Born: 8 December 1977 (age 48); Tartu, then part of Estonian SSR, Soviet Union
- Occupation: Actress
- Years active: 1998–present
- Children: 4

Maarja Jakobson (born 8 December 1977) is an Estonian television, stage and film actress whose career began in the late 1990s.

== Early life and education ==
Maarja Jakobson was born in Tartu in 1977. She is distantly related to 19th-century writer and politician Carl Robert Jakobson, who played a pivotal role in the Estonian national awakening. She graduated from the 15th Secondary School of Tartu (now, the Tartu Descartes Lyceum) in 1995 and enrolled at the University of Tartu to study German for a year before enrolling in the performing arts department of the Estonian Academy of Music and Theatre in Tallinn in 1996 to study acting under the direction of theatre pedagogue and stage director Ingo Normet, graduating in 2000. Among her graduating classmates were actors Kersti Heinloo, Margus Prangel, Eva Püssa, Katrin Pärn, Tambet Tuisk, Piret Simson and directors Urmas Lennuk, Tiit Ojasoo and Vahur Keller.

In 2002, she graduated cum laude from Estonian Academy of Music and Theatre with a master's degree in theatre and drama. She had spent the previous year studying at the Berlin University of the Arts collecting her master's thesis material.

== Career ==
In 1998, while still a student at the Estonian Academy of Music and Theatre, Jakobson was cast in the role of Jane Peterson on the long-running Eesti Televisioon (ETV) television drama series Õnne 13; a role Jakobson has, to date, been performing on the series for over twenty years. In 1999, she made her feature film debut in a small role in the sci-fi adventure Kass kukub käppadele for Exitfilm.

In 2001, Jakobson began an engagement as a stage actress at the Endla Theatre in Pärnu before leaving in 2004 to become a freelance actress. As a freelance actress, she has appeared on the stages of the Vanemuine, the Von Krahl Theatre, the Rakvere Theatre, the Tartu New Theatre and the Kuressaare City Theatre.

After appearing in several film shorts, Jakobson received her first starring role in a feature-length film as Alice in the 2005 Peeter Urbla directed Exitfilm comedy-drama Stiilipidu opposite Anne Reemann and Evelin Võigemast. The same year, she appeared as Stella in the Peeter Simm directed comedy-drama Kõrini!

In 2006, she appeared as Maarja in the comedy-drama Tabamata ime, based on the 1912 play of the same name by author Eduard Vilde and later the same year played the role of Helina in the Veiko Õunpuu directed drama Tühirand, based on the story of the same name penned by Mati Unt. The following year she appeared as Laura, a single mother in the Veiko Õunpuu directed drama Sügisball for which she won the Best Actress award at the 11th Tallinn Black Nights Film Festival on 9 December 2007. On 11 February 2006, she was among ten European actors selected from twenty-one candidates, each representing their country, to be presented with the European Shooting Stars Award by the European Film Promotion (EFP). The event took place during the 56th Berlin International Film Festival.

In 2012, she appeared in the Petri Kotwica directed Finnish-language joint Estonian-Finnish coproduction Rat King as a German language teacher for Allfilm and Making Movies Oy. In 2013, she appeared as Loviisa Maidla in the René Vilbre directed family-adventure film Väikelinna detektiivid ja valge daami saladus. The following year, she appeared as Karmen in the Andres Maimik and Katrin Maimik directed romantic drama Kirsitubakas.

In 2016, she appeared as Juta in the René Vilbre directed Taska Film comedy Klassikokkutulek opposite actors Mait Malmsten, Genka, and Ago Anderson. The film proved to be extremely commercially successful in Estonian theatres and Jakobson reprised her role for the 2018 sequel Klassikokkutulek 2: Pulmad ja matused, and the third installment Klassikokkutulek 3: Ristiisad in 2019.

In 2018, Jakobson had prominent roles in two films: as Aunt Liilia in the Moonika Siimets directed historical drama Seltsimees laps, and as the titular character's mother in the Estonian-Icelandic crime-drama Mihkel, directed by Ari Alexander Ergis Magnússon. In 2023, she had a starring role as Laine in the Ergo Kuld directed comedy film Suvitajad.

In 2024, she began appearing in the role of Anu in the Ergo Kuld directed TV3 drama Valetamisklubi. She also starred in Marko Raat's romantic drama film 8 Views of Lake Biwa as Jänesesilm, and has a minor role in Miguel Llansó's science fiction thriller film Infinite Summer.

Apart from her decades-long role on Õnne 13, Jakobson has also had prominent roles as Annette on the Kanal 2 mystery-drama television series Nukumaja in 2017, and as Monika on the ten-part ETV drama series Miks mitte?! In 2021, she appeared as Liivia Kurm in the Priit Pius directed television drama Süü.

== Personal life ==
Jakobson is married to grocery business executive Paul Lehto. The couple have four children, two sons and two daughters, and reside in Tallinn.
