= Mirtel Pohla =

Estonian actress

- Born: 28 January 1982 (age 44); Tartu, then part of Estonian SSR, Soviet Union
- Occupation: Actress
- Years active: 2004–present

Mirtel Pohla (born 28 January 1982) is an Estonian stage, film and television actress.

== Early life and education ==
Mirtel Pohla was born in Tartu. She attended secondary school at the Tartu Karlova Gümnaasium, graduating in 2000. Afterward, she applied to and was accepted at the Estonian Academy of Music and Theatre, graduating in 2004.

== Stage career ==
Between 2004 and 2006, she was engaged as an actress at the Estonian Drama Theatre in Tallinn. In 2005, she was nominated for a Best Supporting Actress award for her portrayal of Elsa Seebalt in a staging of Andrus Kivirähk's Adolf Rühka lühikene elu. From 2006 until 2014 she was an actress at Theatre NO99 in Tallinn. In 2012, Pohla was awarded the Best Supporting Actress prize at the Estonian Annual Theatre Awards; and was nominated for the same category in 2013. In 2014, she left the Theatre NO99 but has returned as a guest actress. She has also performed at the Vanemuine theatre in Tartu and several other theatres throughout Estonia.

== Film and television ==
Apart from work on the stage, Pohla has appeared in a number of motion pictures and on Estonian television. Her first large television role was that of Berit in the Estonian TV3 soap opera Kodu keset linna from 2003 to 2004 and again from 2007 until 2009.

Her first starring role in a motion picture was that of Ilge in the 2005 Kaaren Kaer directed historical comedy Malev, opposite actor Ott Sepp. In 2006, she had a recurring role as Paula in the popular Kanal 2 television crime series Kelgukoerad. In 2007 she appeared in three popular movies; the Andres Maimik and Rain Tolk comedic road movie Jan Uuspõld läheb Tartusse; the Peeter Simm directed biopic Georg, based on the life of Estonian tenor Georg Ots; and as Jaana, in the Veiko Õunpuu directed bleak drama Sügisball, adapted from Estonian author Mati Unt's 1979 novel of the same name. In 2015, she appeared in the Veiko Õunpuu-directed drama Roukli, and in 2016, appeared in a starring role in the Vallo Toomla-directed thriller Teesklejad opposite actor Priit Võigemast. In 2016, she was offered and accepted the starring role of Karina in Lauri Lagle's directorial film debut Portugal, released in 2018.

From 2008 until 2013, she starred as Maret Roo-Kallaste, one of the four main characters, in ETV's Tuulepealne maa, which was a twelve-part Estonian television mini-series chronicling the pre-World War II history of Estonia; its birth as a country, the Estonian War of Independence, post-war life throughout 1920 up to 1941 and World War II.

In 2021, she had a starring role as Marleen in the Ergo Kuld directed comedy film Jahihooaeg alongside Harriet Toompere and Grete Kuld.

== Selected filmography ==
- Two of Us - Mother (dir. Raul Esko, Romet Esko, Tallifornia, 2024)
- Jahihooaeg - Marleen (dir. Ergo Kuld, Apollo Film Productions, Kassikuld, Taska Film, 2021)
- Eia's Christmas at Phantom Owl Farm - Lilli (dir. Anu Aun, Exitfilm 2018)
- Portugal - Karina (dir. Lauri Lagle, Allfilm, 2018)
- Pretenders - Anna (dir. Vallo Toomla, Amrion Productions, 2016)
- Roukli - Marina (dir. Veiko Õunpuu, 2016)
- The Polar Boy (dir. Anu Aun, Luxfilm, 2016)
- The Secret Society of Souptown - Kadri (dir. Margus Paju, Nafta Films, 2016)
- Zero Point - Gunnar Post's secretary (dir. Mihkel Ulk, Allfilm, 2014)
- Letters to Angel - Merily (dir. Sulev Keedus, F-Seitse, Frame Productions, 2010)
- Autumn Ball - Jaana (dir. Veiko Õunpuu, Homeless Bob Productions, 2007)
- Georg - Margot Ots (dir. Peeter Simm, Allfilm, 2007)
- Indigo Room - Grett (dir. Anu Aun, Luxfilm, 2007) (short)
- 186 Kilometers - Dandelion (dir. Andres Maimik and Rain Tolk, Kuukulgur Film, 2007)
- Empty - Marina (dir. Veiko Õunpuu, Homeless Bob Productions, 2006) (short)
- Men at Arms - Ilge (dir. Kaaren Kaer, Exitfilm, 2005)
- Shop of Dreams - Administrative assistant (dir. Peeter Urbla, Exitfilm, 2005)
