= Indrek Taalmaa =

Estonian actor and theatre director

- Born: 9 July 1967 (age 58); Viljandi, then part of Estonian SSR, Soviet Union
- Occupations: Actor, theatre director
- Years active: 1990–present
- Partner: Karin Tammaru
- Children: 2

Indrek Taalmaa (born 9 July 1967) is an Estonian stage, television, voice, film actor, and theatre director whose career began in the early 1990s.

== Early life and education ==
Indrek Taalmaa was born and raised in the town of Viljandi. He graduated from Viljandi Secondary School No. 4 in 1985. In 1986, he entered the Drama School of the Tallinn State Conservatory (now, the Estonian Academy of Music and Theatre), but was conscripted into the Soviet Army and spent two years deployed to Afghanistan during the Soviet–Afghan War.

== Career ==
=== Stage ===
Indrek Taalmaa has had a prolific career in theatre, beginning with a two-year engagement at the Ugala Theatre in Viljandi in 1991. From 1994 until 1999, he was engaged at the Rakvere Theatre in Rakvere. From 1999 until 2006, he was engaged at the Vanemuine in Tartu, until leaving for the Endla Theatre in Pärnu, where he is still currently engaged. He has also performed throughout Estonia on a number of other stage venues and has been the artistic director of several theatre festivals. In 2013, Taalmaa opened the Tallinn Chamber Theatre in the Tallinn subdistrict of Kalamaja, where he acts as the theatre director and also as a performer, often in solo performances.

=== Television ===
Taalmaa's first significant television role was as Carl Danhammer in the 2005 Ilmar Raag-directed Eesti Televisioon (ETV) television film August 1991; a dramatization of the failed Soviet attempt to suppress the independence movement in Estonia. The following year, he portrayed Konstantin Päts, the first head of government, in the twelve-part ETV historical drama television mini-series Tuulepealne maa. Also, in 2006, he appeared on Finnish television in the role of Igor Golitsyn in the Tapio Piirainen-directed crime drama film Bodomin legenda.

From 2002 until 2009, Taalmaa made frequent appearances on the long-running ETV drama serial Õnne 13 as the character Kuno Pfeffermint. From 2010 until 2012, he played the role of Villem Kadak on the ETV comedy series ENSV: Eesti Nõukogude Sotsialistlik Vabariik, which reflects on life during the 1980s in the Estonian Soviet Socialist Republic. Since 2014, he has played the role of Chef Viktor on the Kanal 2 comedy series Köök. Other notable television appearances include roles on the ETV crime series Ohtlik lend (2009), the TV3 comedy-crime series Kättemaksukontor (2009), the Kanal 2 crime series Kelgukoerad (2010), and the Kanal 2 drama series Romet ja Julia (2012–2013). In 2018, he joined the cast of the ETV series Miks mitte?! in the role of Martin.

=== Film ===
Taalmaa began his film career in several short films and as a voice actor in animated short films in the early 1990s. His first significant film role was that of Oskar Elevant in the 1997 historical comedy Minu Leninid, directed by Hardi Volmer. Other roles followed in the 2005 Rainer Sarnet-directed thriller Libahundi needus and the 2006 Elmo Nüganen-directed comedy Meeletu; both of which were originally aired on Estonian television, then released theatrically. In 2007, he played the role of Talesh in the Peeter Simm-directed biographical drama film Georg, which chronicled the life of Estonian singer and actor Georg Ots. In 2008, he again played the role of President of Estonia Konstantin Päts in the Ain Mäeots-directed Exitfilm biographical drama Taarka, based on the play of the same name by Kauksi Ülle about the difficult life of Seto folk singer Hilana Taarka.

Taalmaa has appeared in over thirty short films, animated films, and feature films. Notable appearances include roles in the 2009 Andrus Tuisk-directed road-movie Pangarööv, the 2013 René Vilbre-directed family film Väikelinna detektiivid ja valge daami saladus, the 2017 Sulev Keedus-directed drama Mehetapja/Süütu/Vari, the 2017 Andres Puustusmaa-directed comedy Rohelised kassid, and the 2018 Moonika Siimets-directed period drama Seltsimees laps. In 2021, he appeared in the role of Mõisnik in the Ergo Kuld directed comedy film Jahihooaeg alongside Harriet Toompere, Mirtel Pohla and Grete Kuld. The following year, he appeared in the Ergo Kuld directed romance-drama Soo, screen written by Martin Algus and based on the novel 1914 novel of the same name by Oskar Luts.

In 2012, when the 1994 Disney animated musical film The Lion King was dubbed into the Estonian language, Taalmaa voiced the character Pumbaa.

== Personal life ==
Indrek Taalmaa is in a long-term relationship with actress Karin Tammaru. The couple have two sons and reside in Tallinn.
