= Harriet Toompere =

Estonian actress

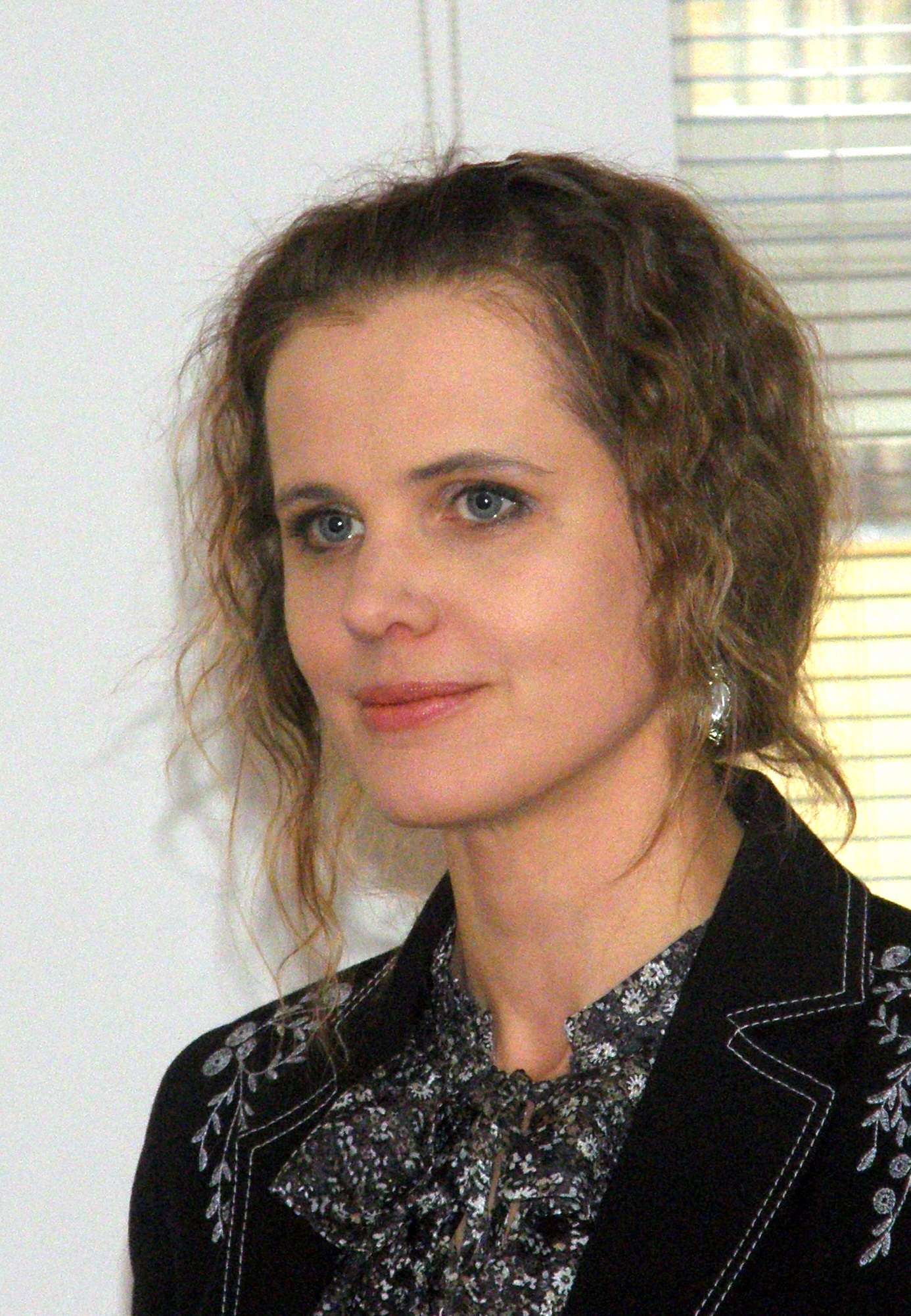
- Born: 22 May 1975 (age 51); Tallinn, then part of Estonian SSR, Soviet Union
- Occupation: Actress
- Years active: 1996–present
- Partner: Mait Malmsten
- Children: 2
- Relatives: Hendrik Toompere Jr. (brother); Hendrik Toompere Jr. Jr. (nephew)

Harriet Toompere (born 22 May 1975) is an Estonian stage, television, and film actress. She is also the author of two children's books.

== Early life and education ==
Harriet Toompere was born in Tallinn to actor and director Hendrik Toompere Sr. and actress Maie Toompere (née Kruusenberg). Her older brother is actor Hendrik Toompere Jr., and her nephew is actor Hendrik Toompere Jr. Jr. Her maternal grandfather was wrestler Herman Kruusenberg.

She studied acting at the EMA Higher Drama School (now, the Estonian Academy of Music and Theatre), graduating in 1998. Among her graduating classmates were actors Hilje Murel, Jan Uuspõld, Tiit Sukk, Veikko Täär, Liina Vahtrik, and Andero Ermel. Her diploma productions at the EMA Higher Drama School were in stage performances in Betti Alver's Lugu valgest varesest in 1996, Alan Jay Lerner and Frederick Loewe's My Fair Lady in 1997, and Madis Kõiv's Peiarite õhtunäitus, also in 1997.

== Stage career ==
Harriet Toompere began her career as stage actress in 1998 at the Estonian Drama Theatre, where she is still currently engaged. Her first stage role for the theatre was as Susanna Hall in a 1998 production of Peter Whelan's historical drama The Herbal Bed. During her may years at the theatre, she has performed in a number of roles by Estonian and international authors and playwrights. Among her more memorable roles at the Estonian Drama Theatre are in works by: Shakespeare, Molière, Chekhov, Tom Stoppard, Betti Alver, Torgny Lindgren, Andrus Kivirähk, Brian Friel, Mihkel Ulman, Astrid Lindgren, Joseph Kesselring, Neil Simon, Jean-Claude Grumberg, Roland Schimmelpfennig, Selma Lagerlöf, Urmas Lennuk, Bogusław Schaeffer, Ingmar Bergman, Paul-Eerik Rummo, Yasmina Reza, Carin Mannheimer, and Martin Algus, among others.

== Television and film career ==
Toompere has appeared in several Estonian television serials. Her first notable role on television was an appearance on the Eesti Televisioon (ETV) crime drama series Ohtlik lend as Maarja in 2006. Other memorable appearances include the role of Anna Moorus on an episode of the popular TV3 comedy-crime series Kättemaksukontor in 2010; a starring role as Anne Kõrvits in the TV3 comedy series Unistuste agentuur in 2010, as Stella in the Kanal 2 comedy series Mägede Varjud in 2013; and as Riina Mägi in the ETV drama series Mustad lesed.

Toompere's first role in film was as the character Anne in the 2001 Peeter Urbla directed film short Ränk ja Kilk for Exitfilm. This was followed by narrating the 2002 Peeter Simm directed documentary Sõda pärast sõda, which chronicled the lives of some of Estonia's Forest Brothers; individuals who had waged a guerrilla war against Soviet rule during the Soviet invasion and occupation of the Estonia during, and after, World War II. In 2006, she voiced the character Sophie in the popular animated Estonian children's film Leiutajateküla Lotte.

In 2011, she had a supporting role as Mari, the daughter of a lonely elderly man (played by Aarne Üksküla) contemplating suicide following the death of his wife in the Mart Kivastik directed Exitfilm Üks mu sõber. The following year, she appeared in a small role in the Kristo Viiding directed Exitfilm romantic mystery Gracias a la Vida, inspired by the Albert Camus novel A Happy Death. In 2016, she appeared as Ruth in the feature-length comedy-drama Õnn tuleb magades, directed by Mart Kivastik, and starring Katariina Unt and Ivo Uukkivi. In 2017, she appeared as Doris Toivonen in the Finnish-Estonian-Swedish historical war drama Ikitie, directed by Antti-Jussi Annila for Finland's Matila Röhr Productions (MRP). Later that year, she appeared as Nurse Maria in the Andres Puustusmaa directed drama Rohelised kassid. In 2018, she appeared as Marleen in the René Vilbre directed comedy Klassikokkutulek 2: Pulmad ja matused; the sequel to the 2016 comedy Klassikokkutulek.

In 2021, she had a starring role as Eva in the Ergo Kuld directed comedy film Jahihooaeg alongside Mirtel Pohla and Grete Kuld. In 2023, she had a starring role as Tiuks in the Mart Kivastik directed comedy film Taevatrepp, opposite husband Mait Malmsten, based on the novel of the same name penned by Kivastik.

== Author ==
In 2005, Harriet Toompere penned the children's book Väike Põhjapõder. The book was illustrated by Anu Kalm and published in December 2005 by Varrak. In 2007, she wrote a second book, Väikese põhjapõdra uued lood, also illustrated by Anu Kalm and published by Varrak in November 2007.

== Personal life ==
Harriet Toompere has been in a long-term relationship with actor Mait Malmsten for over twenty years. The couple have two sons, Hugo and Franz. They reside in the small village of Andineeme, in Kuusalu Parish, Harju County.
