= Ragne Veensalu =

Estonian actress (1986–2024)

- Born: 18 November 1986; Tallinn, then part of Estonian SSR, Soviet Union
- Died: 29 October 2024 (aged 37)
- Occupation: Actress
- Years active: 2011–2024

Ragne Veensalu (18 November 1986 – 29 October 2024) was an Estonian stage, film and television actress.

== Biography ==
=== Early life ===
Ragne Veensalu was born in Tallinn on 18 November 1986. She was the daughter of Kaido Veensalu and Siiri Veensalu (née Lillemägi) and had one sister. Veensalu was a 2011 graduate of University of Tartu Viljandi Culture Academy, majoring in acting.

=== Stage career ===
In 2012, Veensalu has been engaged at the Von Krahl Theatre in Tallinn. Significant roles at the Von Krahl have been in works by Shakespeare, Fyodor Dostoyevsky, Henrik Ibsen, Federico García Lorca and Sarah Kane.

=== Film and television ===
Veensalu made her film debut in a starring role as Ann in the 2007 Rainer Sarnet-directed drama Kuhu põgenevad hinged (English release title: Where Souls Go); the film explores the emotional problems caused when a teenage girl's little brother is born with a congenital heart condition, for which she won a Best Actress award at the Cyprus International Film Festival. In 2011, she played the prominent role of Aglaja in the Rainer Sarnet-directed Idioot; an adaptation of Fyodor Dostoyevsky's The Idiot. In 2012, she appeared in the Rain Tolk and Andres Maimik-directed comedy film Umbkotid.

Beginning in 2015, she became a permanent cast member of the popular TV3 comedy-crime series Kättemaksukontor as the character Luna Haab.

=== Death ===
Veensalu died on 29 October 2024, at the age of 37, following an illness. She was the mother of two young children.
