= Katariina Unt =

Estonian actress

- Born: Katariina Lauk; 6 December 1971 (age 54); Tallinn, then part of Estonian SSR, Soviet Union
- Other names: Katariina Sammul; Katariina Lauk-Tamm
- Occupation: Actor
- Years active: 1994–present
- Spouses: Indrek Sammul (m. 1993; div. 1995) Raivo E. Tamm (m. 1997; div. 2003) ---- Unt (m. 2011)
- Children: 1

Katariina Unt (born Katariina Lauk; 6 December 1971) is an Estonian stage, television, and film actress.

== Early life and education ==
Katariina Unt was born in Tallinn. Her mother is interior decorator Malle Lauk and her father is artist Tõnu Lauk, who works mainly with metals. The youngest of four siblings, she grew up mostly in Pärnu. She graduated in 1990 from Pärnu Hansa Secondary School, then completed her studies in Tallinn at the Estonian Academy of Music and Theatre Drama School in 1994 (now, the Estonian Academy of Music and Theatre). Her graduating classmates included Mait Malmsten, Ain Mäeots, Liisa Aibel, Ago Anderson, Indrek Sammul, and Andres Puustusmaa.

== Stage career ==
Between 1994 and 2001, she was engaged at the Tallinn City Theatre. Following her departure, she worked for a while as a freelance actor, performing at the Estonia Theatre, Endla Theatre and the Kuressaare Town Theatre, among others. In 2007, she joined the VAT Theatre in Tallinn, where she still currently performs. Among her more memorable roles in theater were in works by: William Shakespeare, Anton Chekhov, Madis Kõiv, Molière, Tadeusz Różewicz, Luchino Visconti, Tom Stoppard, Andrus Kivirähk, August Kitzberg and Friedrich Reinhold Kreutzwald, among many others.

== Film and television ==
Katariina Unt made her film debut as Mari in the 1994 Jaan Kolberg-directed film Jüri Rumm. This was followed by a recurring role on the popular ETV drama series Õnne 13. In 2013, she appeared in the Kanal 2 paranormal-thriller television series Süvahavva. Her first large film role was that of Eetla in the 2003 Sulev Keedus-directed war drama Somnambuul (English: Somnambulance). Other popular roles were in films such as Katrin Laur's Ruudi (2006), Veiko Õunpuu's Sügisball (Autumn Ball, 2007), Sulev Keedus' Kirjad Inglile (Letters to Angel, 2011) and Rainer Sarnet's Idioot (The Idiot, 2011), and a starring role as Viivi in the 2016 Mart Kivastik directed romantic drama Õnn tuleb magades opposite actor Ivo Uukkivi. In 2023, she appeared as young Ruth in the Mart Kivastik directed and penned comedy feature film Taveatrepp.

In many of her earlier film and television appearances, she is credited as Katariina Lauk (her birthname) and Katariina Lauk-Tamm (while married to Raivo E. Tamm).

== Personal life ==
In 1993 she married actor Indrek Sammul, the couple divorced in 1995. In 1997, she wed actor Raivo E. Tamm, the two would divorce in 2003. Unt and Tamm have a daughter. In 2011, she remarried once again, taking her husband's surname Unt.

== Selected filmography ==
- Somnambuul (English: Somnambulance, 2003)
- Ruudi (2006)
- Sügisball (English: Autumn Ball, 2007)
- Püha Tõnu kiusamine (English: The Temptation of St. Tony, 2009)
- Kirjad Inglile (English: Letters to Angel, 2010)
- Idioot (English: The Idiot, 2011)
- Lõvikuningas (English: The Lion King, 2012; voice)
- November (2017)
- Infinite Summer (2024) as Detective Katrin

== Awards and recognition ==
- Voldemar Panso Prize (1993)
- Ants Lauter Award (2002)
- Helmi Tohvelman Prize (2010)
- Estonian Theatre Critics' Union award of "Good Theatre" (2011)
- "Monomaffia" Theatre Festival prize (2011)
- Theatre Association Awards, lead actress (Niisa, 2012)
- Monobaltija International Theatre festival award (Niisa, 2012)
