= Liisa Aibel =

Estonian actress

- Born: 21 September 1972 (age 53); Viljandi, then part of Estonian SSR, Soviet Union
- Other name: Liisa Lennuk
- Occupation: Actress
- Years active: 1988–present
- Spouse: Urmas Lennuk

Liisa Aibel (born 21 September 1972) is an Estonian stage, film and television actress.

== Early life and education ==
Liisa Aibel was born in Viljandi and attended school in Pärnu, graduating from Pärnu Secondary School No. 6 in 1990. As a teenager, she became interested in the theatre and studied at the Pärnu School Theatre under the instruction of Aare Laanemets.

In 1990, she enrolled in the performing arts department of the Tallinn Conservatory (now, the Estonian Academy of Music and Theatre) in Tallinn, under instruction of theatre pedagogue and director Ingo Normet, graduating in 1994. Her graduating classmates included Mait Malmsten, Ain Mäeots, Katariina Lauk, Ago Anderson, Indrek Sammul, and Andres Puustusmaa.

== Career ==
=== Stage ===
In 1994, following graduation from the Tallinn Conservatory, Aibel received and engagement at the Endla Theatre in Pärnu. She performed with the theatre until 2004. Notable roles at the Endla Theatre include productions in works by: Anton Chekhov, Selma Lagerlöf, Tove Jansson, Noël Coward, Karl Gassauer, Jerry Herman, Oskar Luts, Charles De Coster, Wendy Kesselman, Luigi Lunari, Aino Pervik, and Bogusław Schaeffer. Since 2004, she has been engaged at the Rakvere Theatre in Rakvere. Some notable roles at the Rakvere Theatre include productions in works by such varied authors and playwrights as: August Strindberg, A. R. Gurney, Patrick Barlow, August Gailit, Tom Kempinski, Edmond Rostand, Donald Churchill, Aleksey Nikolayevich Tolstoy, Arto Paasilinna, Iris Murdoch, Andrus Kivirähk, and Brian Friel.

=== Television ===
Aibel's first significant role on Estonian television was as the character Mõmmi Mai on the Eesti Rahvusringhääling children's television series Mõmmi ja aabits. 20 aastat hiljem, which aired from 1998 until 1999 and was a revamping of the popular 1970s Eesti Televisioon (ETV) children's series Mõmmi ja aabits. In 2005, she was cast in a main role of Sirli Baum in the ETV comedy series Hajameelselt abielus; the series ran for a year, ending in 2006. Other television appearances include roles on the TV3 comedy-crime series Kättemaksukontor, the long-running ETV drama series Õnne 13, and the Kanal 2 crime-drama Siberi võmm.

=== Film ===
Liisa Aibel's first significant role in a feature-length film was the dual roles of Marta and Marion in the 2009 Maiju Ingman-directed drama Päeva lõpus. This was followed by a small role in the Elo Selirand-directed 2010 drama Kutsar koputab kolm korda for Exitfilm. In 2017, she appeared in a small role in Rohelised kassid, directed by former Tallinn Conservatory classmate Andres Puustusmaa.

In 2019, she appeared in the role of Lambasihver in the epic drama film Tõde ja õigus, directed by Tanel Toom. The film was an adaptation of the first volume of the 1926–1933 social epic pentalogy of the same name by Estonian author A. H. Tammsaare. Tõde ja õigus was selected as the Estonian entry for the Best International Feature Film at the 92nd Academy Awards. Also in 2019, she appeared in the Hardi Volmer-directed comedy-adventure film Johannes Pääsukese tõeline elu, which chronicled early 20th-century photographer, filmmaker and ethnographer Johannes Pääsuke's 1913 trek to Setomaa.

== Personal life ==
Liisa Aibel is married to playwright, director, and drama teacher Urmas Lennuk. The couple have a daughter, adopted in May 2008.
