= Empty (film) =

2006 film directed by Veiko Õunpuu

- Estonian: Tühirand
- Directed by: Veiko Õunpuu
- Produced by: Katrin Kissa, Rain Tolk
- Production company: Kuukulgur Film
- Release date: 2006
- Country: Estonia
- Language: Estonian

Empty (Estonian: Tühirand) is a 2006 Estonian drama film directed by Veiko Õunpuu and based on the Mati Unt's same-named story.

Awards:

- 2006: Estonian Film Journalists' Association's award: Neitsi Maali (best film of the year)
- 2006: Tallinn Black Nights Film Festival (Tallinn, Eesti), Scottish Leader Eesti Filmi Auhind
- 2006: annual award by Cultural Endowment of Estonia (best film of the year)

== Cast ==
- Rain Tolk as Mati
- Taavi Eelmaa as Eduard
- Maarja Jakobson as Helina
- Mirtel Pohla as Marina
- Juhan Ulfsak as Neighbour
