= Taavi Eelmaa =

Estonian stage and film actor (born 1971)

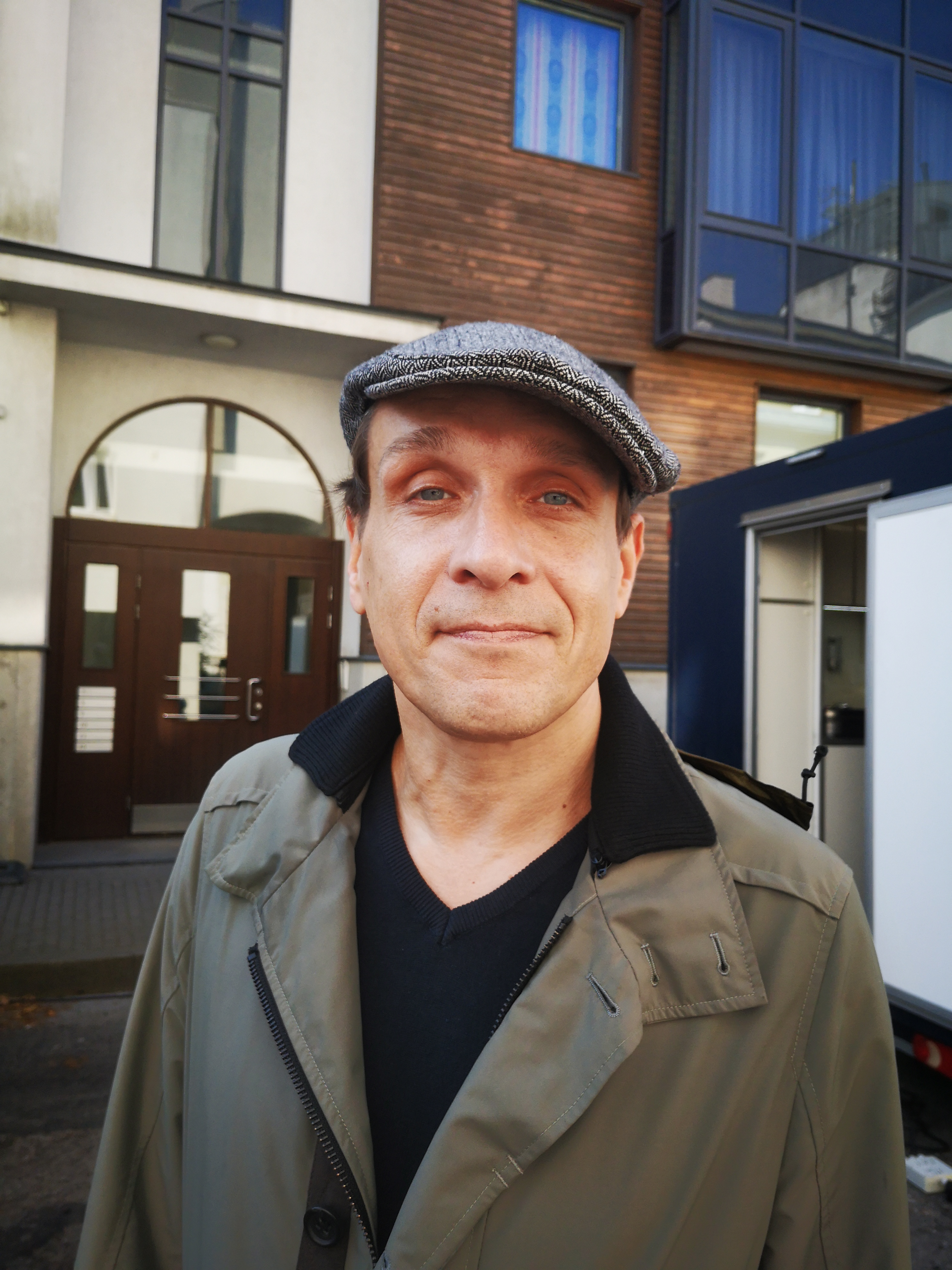
- Eelmaa in 2021
- Born: 15 June 1971 (age 55); Tallinn, then part of Estonian SSR, Soviet Union
- Occupation: Actor
- Years active: 1993–present

Taavi Eelmaa (born 15 June 1971) is an Estonian stage and film actor.

== Biography ==
=== Career ===
Born and raised in Tallinn, he is the son of actor Aleksander Eelmaa and Reet Eelmaa. Taavi Eelmaa began studies at the Estonian Academy of Music and Theatre, graduating in 1996. Among his graduating classmates were Karin Tammaru, Ain Prosa, René Reinumägi, Indrek Saar, Tarvo Sõmer, and Ardo Ran Varres. After graduating, he worked for six years at the Estonian Drama Theatre in Tallinn, and from 2002 to present at the Von Krahl Theatre in Tallinn.

Eelmaa made his screen debut in 1993 in the Rainer Sarnet-directed short film Merehaigus (English: Seasickness) and has gone on to appear in roles in numerous Estonian films. Among his more memorable roles were as Theo in the 2007 Veiko Õunpuu-directed drama Sügisball (English: Autumn Ball), inspired by Estonian writer Mati Unt's novel of the same name, and as the title character in Õunpuu's 2009 black comedy Püha Tõnu kiusamine (English: The Temptation of St. Tony). The film was selected as Estonia's submission for the Academy Award for Best Foreign Language Film at the 83rd Academy Awards, but it didn't make the final shortlist. He has also appeared on television, most notably as the character Priit Post in the Kanal 2 crime series Kelgukoerad.

== Selected filmography ==
- Ruudi (2006)
- Tühirand (Empty, 2006)
- Meeletu (Mindless, 2006)
- Sügisball (Autumn Ball, 2007)
- Püha Tõnu kiusamine (The Temptation of St. Tony, 2009)
- 60 Seconds of Solitude in Year Zero (2011)
- Idioot (The Idiot, 2011)
- Purge (Finnish: Puhdistus, 2012)
- Päevad, mis ajasid segadusse (The Days That Confused, 2016)
- November (2017)
- Viimased (The Last Ones, 2020)
- Reunion 3: Singles Cruise (Finnish: Luokkakokous 3 – Sinkkuristeily, 2021)
