= Ulfsak =

Ulfsak is a surname. Notable people with the surname include:

- Juhan Ulfsak (born 1973), Estonian actor
- Lembit Ulfsak (1947–2017), Estonian actor
