= Raivo E. Tamm =

Estonian actor and politician

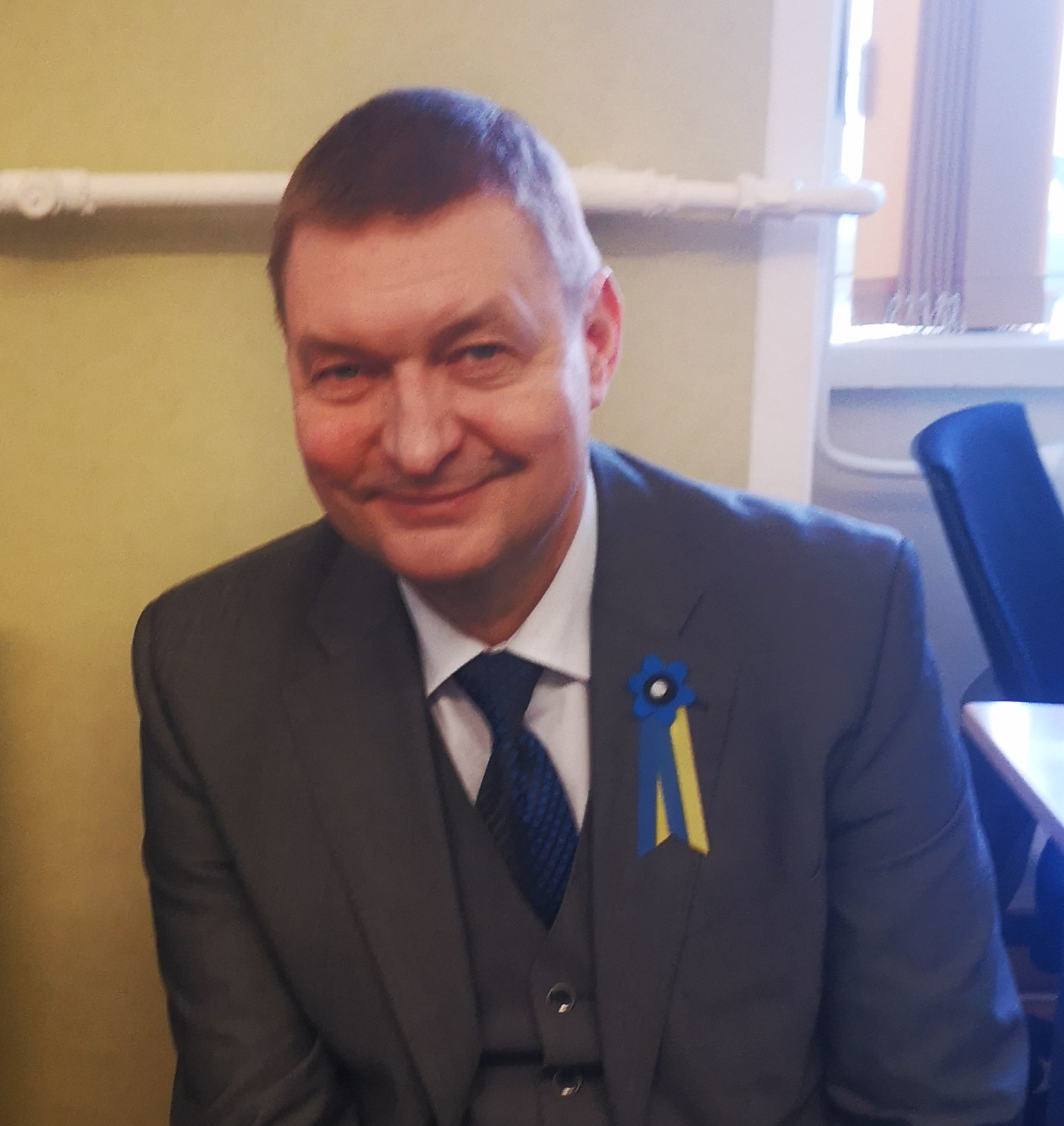
Raivo E. Tamm, 2022

Raivo E. Tamm (born 15 July 1965) is an Estonian actor and politician. In 2019, he was elected as a member of the XIV Riigikogu.

Tamm was born in Tallinn. In 1988 he graduated from Estonian Academy of Music and Theatre specializing in acting. From 1988 to 1993 he was an actor for the Vanalinnastuudio theatre; 1994 for Tallinn City Theater.

Since 2019 he has been a member of Isamaa party.

== Personal life ==
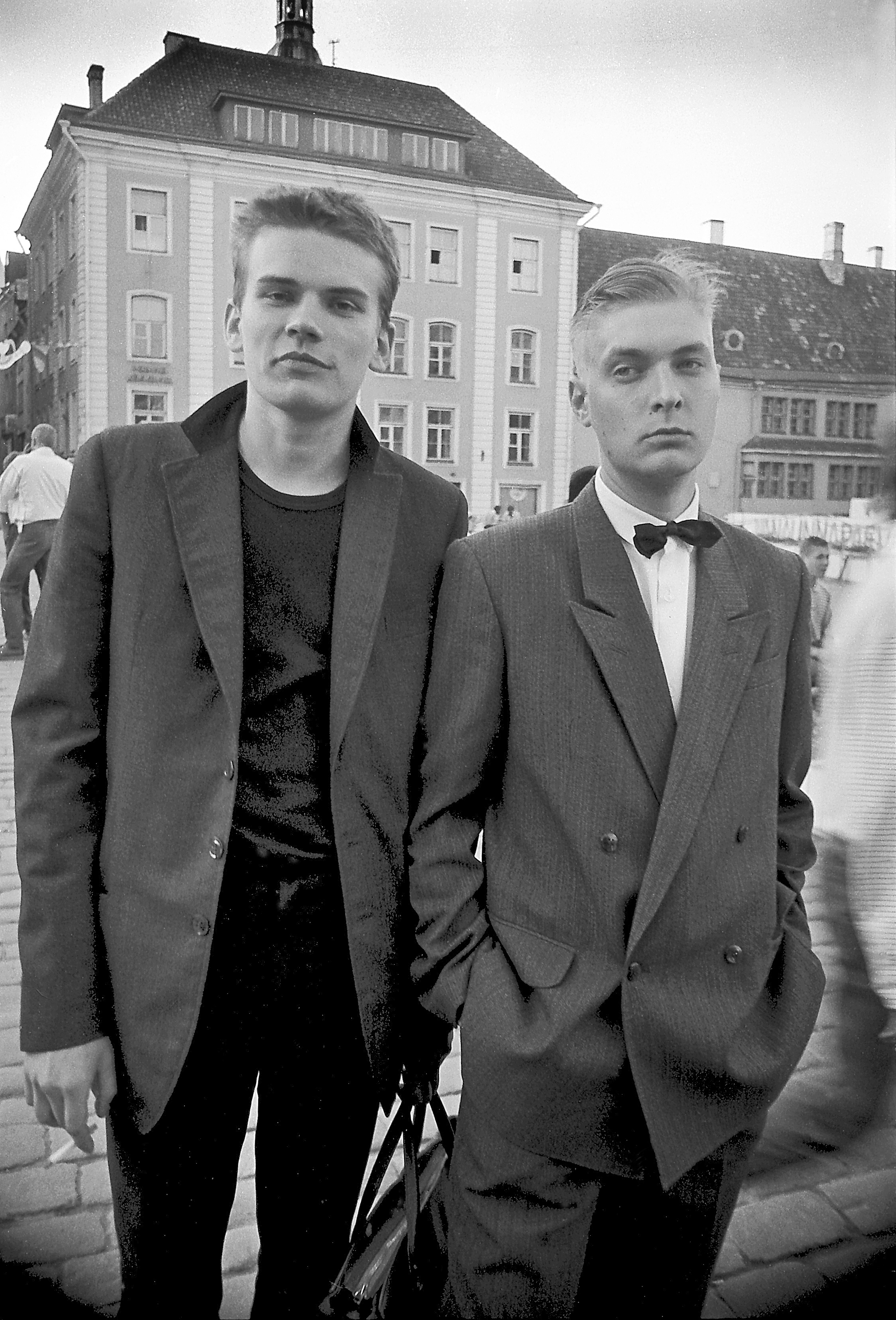
Raivo E. Tamm (right), aged 21, and actor Andres Noormets (left), aged 22, in 1986

Tamm was married to actress Külli Palmsaar, with whom he had a daughter. The couple later divorced. He then married actress Katariina Unt from 1997 until their divorce in 2003. The couple had a daughter. In 2007, he married actress Helena Merzin, with whom he has a son, born in 2015.

== Selected filmography ==
- Õnne 13 (1993–present)
- Malev (2005)
- Shop of Dreams (2005)
- Autumn Ball (2007)
- The Temptation of St. Tony (2009)
- Mushrooming (2012)
