= Eelmaa =

Estonian family name

Origin
- Language: Estonian
- Meaning: "fore land"
- Region of origin: Estonia

Eelmaa is an Estonian surname meaning "fore land"; a compound of eel (fore, in front of) and maa (land).

As of 1 January 2021, 59 men and 66 women in Estonia have the surname Eelmaa. Eelmaa is ranked as the 1670th most common surname for men in Estonia, and 1643th for women. The surname Eelmaa is most common in Rapla County, where 2.39 per 10,000 inhabitants of the county bear the surname.

Notable people bearing the surname Eelmaa include:

- Aleksander Eelmaa (1946–2021), actor
- Andres Eelmaa (born 2000), folk musician (Lõõtsavägilased), actor, journalist
- Liisi Eelmaa (born 1982), theatre artist
- Taavi Eelmaa (born 1971), actor
