= Ruudi =

2006 film directed by Katrin Laur

- Directed by: Katrin Laur
- Produced by: Piret Tibbo-Hudgins
- Production company: Allfilm
- Release date: 2006
- Country: Estonia
- Language: Estonian

Ruudi is a 2006 Estonian family film directed by Katrin Laur.

Awards:

- 2006: MAFF - Multimedia Audiovisual Film Festival (Warsaw, Poland), second prize
- 2006: SCHLINGEL International Film Festival (Chemnitz, Germany), audience prize
- 2006: Tokyo International Film Festival (Japan), Grand Prix

== Cast ==
- Paul Oskar Soe as Ruudi
- Juta Altmets as Vika
- Tarvo Langeberg as Ints
- Marvo Langeberg as Ants
- Mairo Ainsar as Aleks
- Guido Kangur as Sass
- Aarne Mägi as Enn
- Katariina Unt as Karmen, Ruudi's mother
- Aleksander Eelmaa as Jaak Lolle
- Ülle Kaljuste as Liivi
- Ines Aru as Metsa Aino
- Jan Uuspõld as Gynnar
- Dan Põldroos as Leif
- Indrek Taalmaa as Father of twins
- Helga Nurmekann as Folk musician
- Ain Hannus as Folk musician
- Janek Joost as Head Viking
- Juhan Ulfsak as Host of beauty contest
- Taavi Eelmaa as Host of beauty contest
- Anna-Maria Toom as Beauty contest winner
- Raine Tarima as Finn
- Väino Puura as Singer
- Maie Saulep as Old woman with coat
- Rein Pruul as Angry driver
- Paul Vahelaan as Customer
- Kristel Leesmend as Nurse
- Lembit Sarapuu as Old Orm
