= Tiina Tauraite =

Estonian actress (born 1976)

Tiina Tauraite (born on 2 June 1976 in Tallinn, Estonia) is an Estonian actress.

In 1998 she graduated from the Estonian Academy of Music and Theatre. Since then, she has worked as a theatre actress at Von Krahl Theatre. Besides theatre roles she has appeared in a number of films (most notably The Temptation of St. Tony (2009), Autumn Ball (2007) and the 2016 film The Spy and the Poet) and television series (Elu keset linna (2012) and Screwed in Tallinn in 1999).

Besides her native Estonian, Tauraite is fluent in English, Russian and Finnish.

== Filmography ==
- 2008: Sügisball
- 2009: The Temptation of St. Tony
- 2011: Idioot
- 2016: Kala-kala
- 2016: Luuraja ja luuletaja
- 2018: Omad
- 2019: Colours in Black & White
- 2019: Virago
- 2020: Teene
- 2020: My Dear Corpses
- 2021: Sandra saab tööd
- 2023: Nähtamatu võitlus
- 2024: Biwa järve 8 nägu
- 2024: The Missile (Ohjus)
- 2024: Two of Us
- 2026: Our Erika

== Television ==
- 2018: Lõks
- 2018: Pank

== Awards ==
Tauraite has received three Estonian Theatre Awards. In 2008 she was awarded for her work as supporting actor in "Seagull", as Best Supporting Actor in the 2012 production "Dona Rosita The Spinster" and a Special Award for her one-woman show "Tiina Tauraite's Tractor."
