= Pulmapilt =

1980 film directed by Raul Tammet

- Directed by: Raul Tammet
- Written by: Svjatoslav Gervassijev
- Starring: Rein Aren; Lembit Ulfsak
- Cinematography: Jüri Garšnek
- Edited by: Vladimir Malõgin
- Music by: Gunnar Graps
- Production companies: Tallinnfilm; Mosfilm's collective "Debüüt"
- Release date: June 1980
- Running time: 29 minutes
- Country: Estonia
- Language: Estonian

Pulmapilt (English: Wedding Picture) is a 1980 Estonian sci-fi film directed by Raul Tammet.

Awards, nominations, participations:

- 1983: Soviet Estonia Film Festival (USSR), best male actor: Rein Aren

== Plot ==
An elderly man saves the life of an alien who is capable of time travel. They go back in time to the man's wedding day.

== Cast ==
- Rein Aren
- Lembit Ulfsak
- Ella Rihvk
- Paul Laasik
- Katrin Püttsepp
