= Jan Uuspõld läheb Tartusse =

2007 film directed by Andres Maimik and Rain Tolk

- Directed by: Andres Maimik; Rain Tolk
- Written by: Andres Maimik; Rain Tolk
- Produced by: Alvar Reinumägi; Rain Tolk; Meelis Mäeots
- Starring: Jan Uuspõld
- Cinematography: Mart Taniel
- Music by: Vaiko Eplik; Sten Sheripov
- Production company: Kuukulgur Film
- Release date: 2007
- Running time: 118 minutes
- Country: Estonia
- Language: Estonian

Jan Uuspõld läheb Tartusse (English release title: 186 Kilometres) is a 2007 Estonian comedy film directed by Andres Maimik and Rain Tolk.

== Plot ==
Jan Uuspõld, a talented actor who has lost his top form due to alcoholism, decides to stop playing a TV clown and take on a serious role in the Vanemuine theater, located in Estonian city of Tartu. He doesn't have money to take a bus ride, so he begins a long road trip from Tallinn to Tartu. On a way there, he meets all kinds of different, unique and interesting people.

== Cast ==
- Jan Uuspõld as Jan
- Roman Baskin as Theatre director
- Rita Raave as Stage manager
- Mait Malmsten as himself
- Lembit Ulfsak as himself
- Andres Maimik as Barman
- Mari-Liis Lill as Marion
- Tõnu Kilgas as Georg Ots
- Ain Mäeots as himself
- Raul Saaremets as Arvo Pärt
- Ott Sepp as Akselerant Ott
- Raul Põllusmaa as Tractor driver
- Paul Laasik as Inseminator
- Dan Põldroos as Foreman
- Enn Klooren as Agronomist
- Liina Tennosaar as Viire
- Viire Valdma as Liina
- Rain Tolk as Hippie
- Margus Vaher as Nature man
- Meelis Adamson as Platoon commander Mart
- Juss Haasma as Soldier Juss
- Mirtel Pohla as Dandelion
- Juhan Ulfsak as Valev
- Toomas Hussar as Church pastor
- Hannes Võrno as Eco-businessman
- Arvo Kukumägi as Mr. Jürna
- Reet Linna as Reet Linna
- Kadri Kõusaar as VIP guest
- Toomas Hendrik Ilves as himself
- Linnar Priimägi as Philologist Linnar
- Marko Mägi as Reporter Marko
- Mihkel Smeljanski Politician Edgar
- Taavi Teplenkov as Politician's voice
- Liina Vahtrik as Nationalist mother
- Berk Vaher as Literary man Berk
- Peeter Volkonski as Stage director Volk

== Release ==
Participation in film festivals:

- 2007: goEast - Festival of Central and Eastern European Film (Wiesbaden, Germany), competition program
- 2007: Warsaw International Film Festival (Poland)
- 2007: Kinoshock - Open Film Festival for states of the CIS and Estonia, Latvia and Lithuania (Anapa, Russia)
- 2007: Vancouver Film Festival (Canada), 2007
- 2008: Mumbai Film Festival (India)
