= 8 Views of Lake Biwa =

- Theatrical release poster
- Estonian: Biwa järve 8 nägu
- Directed by: Marko Raat
- Screenplay by: Marko Raat
- Based on: 8 Views of Lake Biwa by Max Dauthendey
- Produced by: Ivo Felt; Dora Nedeczky
- Starring: Elina Masing
- Cinematography: Sten-Johan Lill
- Edited by: Jaak Ollino Jr.
- Music by: Jakob Juhkam
- Production companies: Allfilm; Oy Bufo Ab
- Distributed by: ACME Film
- Release dates: January 31, 2024 (IFFR); March 8, 2024 (Estonia)
- Running time: 126 minutes
- Countries: Estonia; Finland
- Language: Estonian
- Budget: €1.3 million

8 Views of Lake Biwa (Estonian: Biwa järve 8 nägu) is a 2024 romantic drama film written and directed by Marko Raat. A co-production between Estonia and Finland, the film stars Elina Masing. It is loosely based on the novel of the same name by Max Dauthendy. It was selected as the Estonian entry for the Best International Feature Film at the 97th Academy Awards, but was not nominated.

== Synopsis ==
On the shimmering shores of Europe's otherworld, two young girls, Hanake and her best friend, talk about their first love interest while watching the yachts sailing toward Kyoto. Nevertheless, the magic is fading in their isolated fishing village as they deal with a recent disaster. It is clear that intimacy alone will not help them process their loss.

== Cast ==
The actors participating in this film are:

- Elina Masing as Hanake
- Simeoni Sundja as Kiri
- Kärt Kokkota as Merikarp
- Tommi Korpela as Platon
- Maarja Jakobson as Jänesesilm
- Hendrik Toompere Jr. as Roman
- Tiina Tauraite as Õnne
- Jan Uuspõld as Sora
- Jarmo Reha as Okuro
- Jüri Vlassov as Siimeon
- Peeter Tammearu as Timofei
- Meelis Rämmeld as Andrei
- Liina Tennosaar as Nina
- Erki Laur as Ain

== Production ==
Principal photography began July 28, 2022, and wrapped on September 10, 2022, at Lake Peipus, Estonia.

== Release ==
It had its world premiere on January 31, 2024, at the 53rd International Film Festival Rotterdam, then screened on June 21, 2024, at the 23rd Transilvania International Film Festival, on July 24, 2024, at the 31st Palić European Film Festival, and on September 22, 2024, at the Helsinki International Film Festival.

It was commercially released on March 8, 2024, in Estonian theaters.

== See also ==
- List of submissions to the 97th Academy Awards for Best International Feature Film
- List of Estonian submissions for the Academy Award for Best International Feature Film
