= Külli Palmsaar =

Estonian actress

- Born: 1 October 1966 (age 59); Tallinn, then part of Estonian SSR, Soviet Union
- Occupation: Actress
- Spouse(s): Heino Seljamaa (divorced); Raivo E. Tamm (divorced)

Külli Palmsaar (born 1 October 1966) is an Estonian actor.

== Early life and education ==
Palmsaar was born in Tallinn, Estonia, on 1 October 1966 and graduated from the Tallinn State Conservatory (now, the Estonian Academy of Music and Theatre) in 1988. Among her graduating classmates were actors Dajan Ahmet, Epp Eespäev, Merle Jääger, Piret Kalda, Elmo Nüganen, Anne Reemann, Rain Simmul, Artur Talvik, Hendrik Toompere Jr. and Raivo E. Tamm.

== Career ==
Palmsaar worked as an announcer for the Eesti Televisioon from 1989 to 1996. She performed theatre roles in multiple venues including the Estonian National Puppet Theatre, Rakvere Theatre, Tallinn City Theatre, Estonian Drama Theatre and Theater der Nacht. In 2009, she co-founded the First Hand Theatre with Danish puppeteer Hans Hartvich-Madsen.

Palmsaar also starred in films and TV series such as Õnne 13 , Kättemaksukontor, Saladused, Härra Lapsti lasteteater, Ühikarotid, Parim enne, Viimane võmm and Vidiots TV.

== Filmography ==
- 1985 The Gang (feature film)
- 1984 Karoliine's Silver Yarn (feature film)
- 1990 Regina (feature film)
- 1993 Hysteria (feature film, Finland)
- 1993 Darkness in Tallinn (feature film)
- 2010 The Snow Queen (feature film)
- 2012 Dorm Rats: Sisters (TV series)
- 2014 Free (student film)
- 2014 Do svidaniya mama (feature film, Russia)
- 2018 True (short feature film)
- 2018 The Little Comrade (feature film)
- 2020 Tenet
