= Nazis and Blondes =

2008 documentary by Arbo Tammiksaar

Nazis and Blondes (Estonian: Fritsud ja blondiinid (Note: The literal translation of the original Estonian title is "Fritzes and Blondes". "Fritz" and "Hans" were pejorative references to Nazi Germans in the Soviet Union since World War II and a tall athletic blonde man with blue eyes is a stereotypical image of a true Nordic Aryan Herrenmensch.)) is a 2008 Estonian-Latvian-Lithuanian documentary about actors from the Baltic states who played the roles of Nazi villains in the Soviet World War II films.

== Plot ==
The tagline of the documentary is: "They were young. They were beautiful. They looked like Germans." The film traces the history of the Baltic actors who helped to create the image of a German enemy in Soviet films. The documentary portrays Tõnu Aav, Uldis Lieldidžs, Algimantas Masiulis (the first three ones are the central actors of the film, of whom Lieldidžs stands out by playing the largest number of roles of this type, in nearly 40 films), Ervin Abel, Juozas Budraitis, Ants Eskola, Olev Eskola, Harijs Liepiņš, Viktors Lorencs, Jüri Lumiste, Heino Mandri, Bruno O'Ya, and Lembit Ulfsak.

== Production ==
The film was co-produced by the Estonian film studio Kuukulgur Film, the Latvian one, Subjektiv Filma, and the Lithuanian VG studija. It was produced in two versions: 82 min. for the cinema and 52 min. for TV. The film was partially financed by a grant from Eurimages, as well as by the National Film Centre of Latvia, the Latvian State Culture Capital Foundation and the Estonian Film Foundation.

The filming took two years and cost about 2.4 million.

The film producers organized a massive get-together for several dozen veteran actors who have played blonde Nazis in Soviet films, in a castle in Kurzeme, producing a massive gala, with the swastika overlaid with the hammer and sickle, and Young Pioneers, and Hitlerjugend, and the fireworks. Martin Aadamsoo notes the absence of the famous Lithuanian actor Juozas Budraitis there (who did act as a Nazi German in notable Soviet films, such as The Shield and the Sword and Blockade, but that was a minor part of his long career).

== Commentary ==
Tarmo Teder notes that these actors never played the German top brass. He thinks that was because Nazi leaders were supposed to be shown as despicable villains, and therefore these roles could not be given to the actors who evoke sympathy. He also writes that this use of Baltic actors fostered in the Soviet populace the streotype of Baltic peoples as Nazi sympathizers. He also criticized the film for its inconsistency of author's position and for not giving clear answers. At the same time he recognizes the difficulties in handling the huge amount of pertinent material.
