= Infinite Summer (film) =

- Theatrical release poster
- Directed by: Miguel Llansó
- Written by: Miguel Llansó
- Produced by: Allison Rose Carter; Tõnu Hiielaid; Miguel Llansó; Rain Rannu; Jon Read
- Starring: Hannah Gross; Johanna Aurelia Rosin; Teele Kaljuvee-O'Brock
- Cinematography: Israel Seoane
- Edited by: Velasco Broca
- Music by: Laurie Spiegel
- Production companies: Lanzadera Films; Savage Rose Films; Tallifornia
- Distributed by: Tallifornia
- Release dates: August 27, 2024 (Fantasia); April 11, 2025 (Estonia)
- Running time: 90 minutes
- Countries: Estonia; United States; Spain
- Languages: Estonian; English

Infinite Summer (Estonian: Igavene suvi) is a 2024 science fiction thriller adventure film written, co-produced and directed by Miguel Llansó. A co-production between Estonia, the United States and Spain, the film stars Hannah Gross, Johanna Aurelia Rosin and Teele Kaljuvee-O'Brock.

== Synopsis ==
Mia spends her summer vacation in a cabin with Grete, her best friend, and Sarah, with whom she has a complicated relationship. There, they discover a mysterious young man and his exciting new approach to dating. Through an interactive dating app, a new reality unfolds before their eyes.

== Cast ==
- Hannah Gross as Sarah
- Johanna Aurelia Rosin as Grete
- Teele Kaljuvee-O'Brock as Mia
- Ciaron Davies as Ivo / Dr. Mindfulness
- Denise Moreno as Muki
- Steve Vanoni as Detective Jack
- Katariina Unt as Detective Katrin
- Ivo Uukkivi as Mia's Father
- Anne Paluver as Grandma
- Sissi Nylia Benita as Sisi
- Lily Yuri as Detective Yasuko
- Maarja Jakobson as Doctor
- Erki Veiko as Policeman
- Agustín Mateo as Hologram Lorenzo
- Kristin Kalamees as Nurse
- Saamuel Pilpak as Boy 1
- Theodor Tabor as Boy 2
- Germo Toonikus as Party Popper
- Markus Mikk as Delivery Guy
- Mikk Rand as Suspect 1
- Jelena Garanina as Suspect 2
- Hendra Raud Zoo as Volunteer
- Alis Mäesalu as Radio
- Roland Treima as Boy in the Dream
- Erko Kundla as Helicopter Pilot
- Carlos Lesmes as Carlos

== Release ==
Infinite Summer had its world premiere on July 27, 2024, at the 28th Fantasia International Film Festival, then screened on August 7, 2024, at the 7th Octopus Film Festival, on September 16, 2024, at the Helsinki International Film Festival, on September 20, 2024, at the 5th Sydney Science Fiction Film Festival, on October 4, 2024, at the 57th Sitges Film Festival, on October 25, 2024, at the Imagine Film Festival, on November 10, 2024, at the QCinema International Film Festival, and on May 3, 2025, at the Haapsalu Horror and Fantasy Film Festival.

The film was commercially released on April 11, 2025, in Estonian theaters.

== Reception ==
=== Critical reception ===
On the review aggregator website Rotten Tomatoes, 85% of 13 critics' reviews are positive.

=== Accolades ===
Year	Award / Festival	Category	Recipient	Result	Ref.
2024	28th Fantasia International Film Festival	Cheval Noir - Best Film	Infinite Summer	Nominated	
2024	57th Sitges Film Festival	Noves Visions - Best Film	Infinite Summer	Nominated	
