= Candles in the Dark =

1993 television film directed by Maximilian Schell

- Genre: Drama
- Written by: Nicholas Niciphor
- Directed by: Maximilian Schell
- Starring: Alyssa Milano; Chad Lowe
- Music by: Richard Bowers
- Country of origin: United States
- Original language: English

Production
- Executive producer: James M. Dowaliby
- Producer: Ilmar Taska
- Production location: Tallinn, Estonia
- Running time: 88 minutes
- Production company: Family Productions

Original release
- Network: The Family Channel
- Release: December 3, 1993

Candles in the Dark is a 1993 American made for television Christmas drama film directed by Maximilian Schell. Produced for The Family Channel, the film stars Alyssa Milano and Chad Lowe.

== Plot ==
When her father thinks she is too spoiled, he sends Sylvia to her aunt in Estonia. She soon finds herself engulfed in a struggle with her father, and finds herself being hunted by the KGB. Meanwhile, after she meets Jaan, Sylvia immediately falls in love with him. Together, they fight to keep the Christmas spirit alive in the dark and old fashioned city.

== Cast ==
- Alyssa Milano as Sylvia Velliste
- Chad Lowe as Jaan Toome
- Natalya Andrejchenko as Marta Velliste
- Günther Maria Halmer as Pastor Harma
- Maximilian Schell as Colonel Arkush
- Aleksey Petrenko
- Gita Ränk as Tiina
- Helena Merzin as Natasha Omeltchenko
- Lembit Ulfsak as Gospodin Omeltchenko
- Mart Sander as the resistance fighter
- Hendrik Toompere Sr.
- Andres Puustusmaa
- Salme Reek
- Elle Kull
- Maria Avdjuško

== Production ==
The film was shot between August and September 1993 on location with an Estonian crew, most of whom did not speak English. According to the Los Angeles Times, this was the first non-Estonian film to be shot in Estonia. Maximilian Schell looked back on production and the crew: "They would say 'yes' to everything. Sometimes it would fit and sometimes it wouldn't. Our time was very short with the sound and music, all of the coordination. It was a lot to do in such a short period of time."

The version aired on the Family Channel was not Schell's final cut. He planned on buying the film's rights to distribute a re-edited version overseas, but this never happened.

== Reception ==
Variety magazine wrote: "Candles in the Dark is a sweet, endearing but safe story that occasionally suffers from low production values and muddled sub-characters but will no doubt make the family weep."

== See also ==
- List of Christmas films
