= The Last Ones (film) =

2020 Estonian-Finnish drama film

- Film poster
- Directed by: Veiko Õunpuu
- Starring: Pääru Oja
- Release date: 22 September 2020 (Finland)
- Running time: 117 minutes
- Countries: Estonia; Finland
- Language: Finnish

The Last Ones (Finnish: Viimeiset, Estonian: Viimased) is a 2020 Estonian-Finnish drama film directed by Veiko Õunpuu. It was selected as the Estonian entry for the Best International Feature Film at the 93rd Academy Awards, but it was not nominated.

== Plot ==
In a mining village in Lapland, reindeer herders and miners worry about their future.

== Cast ==
- Pääru Oja as Rupi
- Tommi Korpela as Kari Kolehmainen
- Laura Birn as Riitta
- Elmer Bäck as Lievonen
- Sulevi Peltola as Chief Oula
- Samuli Edelmann as Tatu
- Jarkko Lahti as Foreman
- Tero Jartti as Moilanen
- Indrek Spungin as Kinnunen
- Emmi Parviainen as Sanna
- Juhan Ulfsak as Butcher
- Taavi Eelmaa as Boatswain Dieter
- Veiko Õunpuu as Helmsman Bohlen
- Pirjo Leppänen as Maisa
- Timo-Pekka Luoma as Miner
- Tom Petäjä as Policeman
- Pasi Kajo as Policeman
- Jouni Laaksomies as Politician

== See also ==
- List of submissions to the 93rd Academy Awards for Best International Feature Film
- List of Estonian submissions for the Academy Award for Best International Feature Film
