= Guido Kangur =

Estonian actor (born 1956)

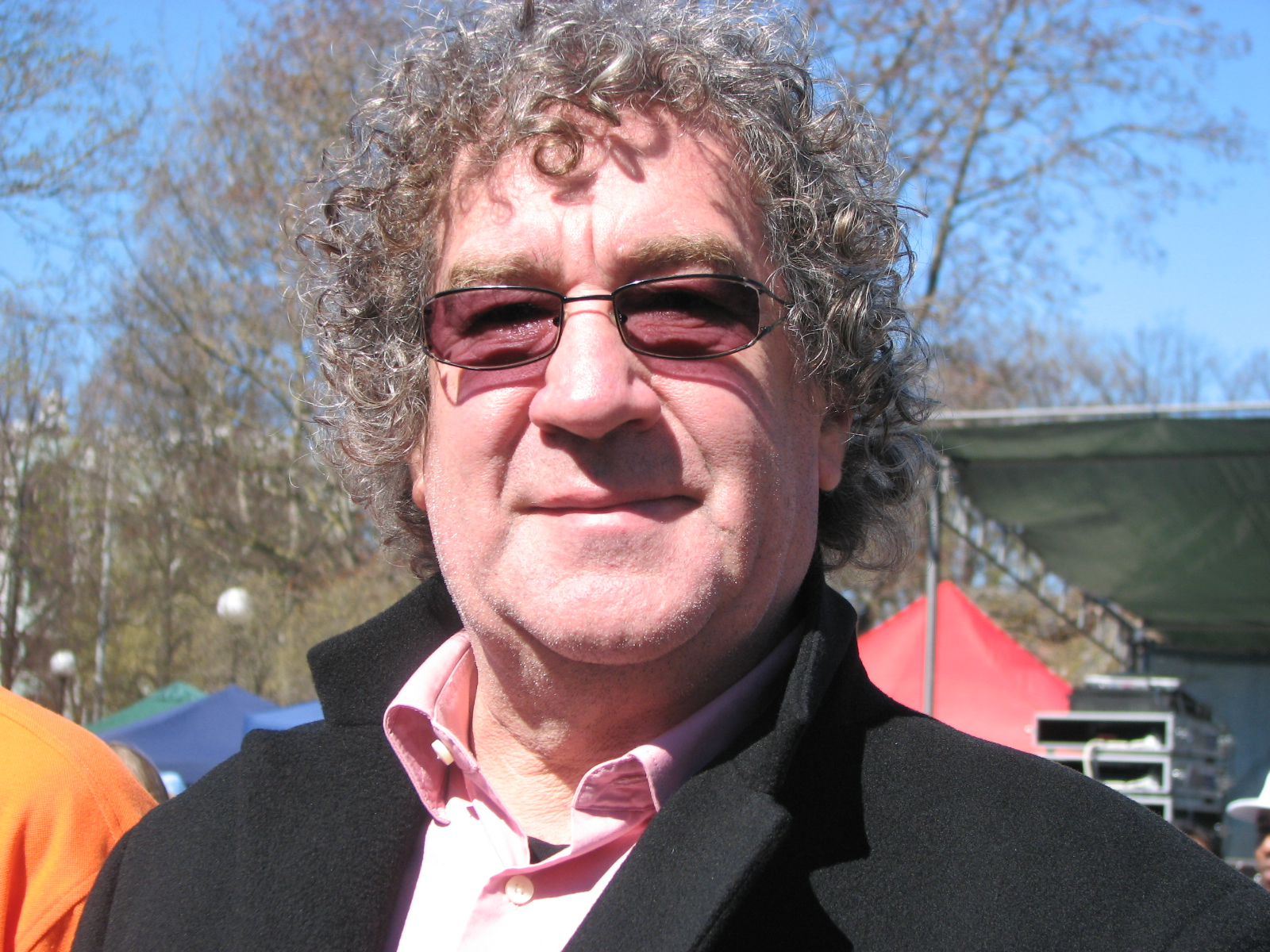
Guido Kangur

Guido Kangur (born 9 June 1956) is an Estonian actor.

Kangur was born in Kohtla-Järve. In 1980 he graduated from Tallinn State Conservatory. From 1980 to 1992 he was an actor in Noorsooteater. Since 1992 he is an actor in Estonian Drama Theatre. He has also played in many films and theater plays.

== Selected filmography ==
- Names in Marble (2002)
- Ruudi (2006)
- Farts of Fury (2011)
- Elu keset linna (2012)
- The Wall (2012)
- Living Images (2013)
- It Flies to the Hive (2015)
- Üheotsapilet (2015)
- The Manslayer/The Virgin/The Shadow (2017)
- Deserved Happiness (2018)
- On The Water (2020)
- Salmonid 25 aastat hiljem (2020)
- Kuulsuse narrid (2023)
