= The Idiot (2011 film) =

2011 film

- Film poster
- Directed by: Rainer Sarnet
- Written by: Fyodor Dostoyevsky; Rainer Sarnet
- Produced by: Katrin Kissa
- Starring: Risto Kübar
- Cinematography: Mart Taniel
- Release date: 14 October 2011
- Running time: 132 minutes
- Country: Estonia
- Language: Estonian

The Idiot (Estonian: Idioot) is a 2011 Estonian drama film directed by Rainer Sarnet and based on the 1869 novel of the same name by Fyodor Dostoyevsky.

== Cast ==
- Risto Kübar as Myshkin
- Katariina Unt as Nastasja Filippovna
- Tambet Tuisk as Rogozin
- Ragne Veensalu as Aglaja
- Ain Lutsepp as Jepantsin
- Ülle Kaljuste as Jelizaveta
- Tiina Tauraite as Aleksandra
- Sandra Üksküla-Uusberg as Adelaida
- Kaido Veermäe as Ganja
- Juhan Ulfsak as Ippolit
- Roman Baskin as Totski
- Taavi Eelmaa as Lebedev
- Liina Vahtrik as Varja
