= Andineeme =

Village in Estonia

Coordinates: 59°30′N 25°28′E

- Village
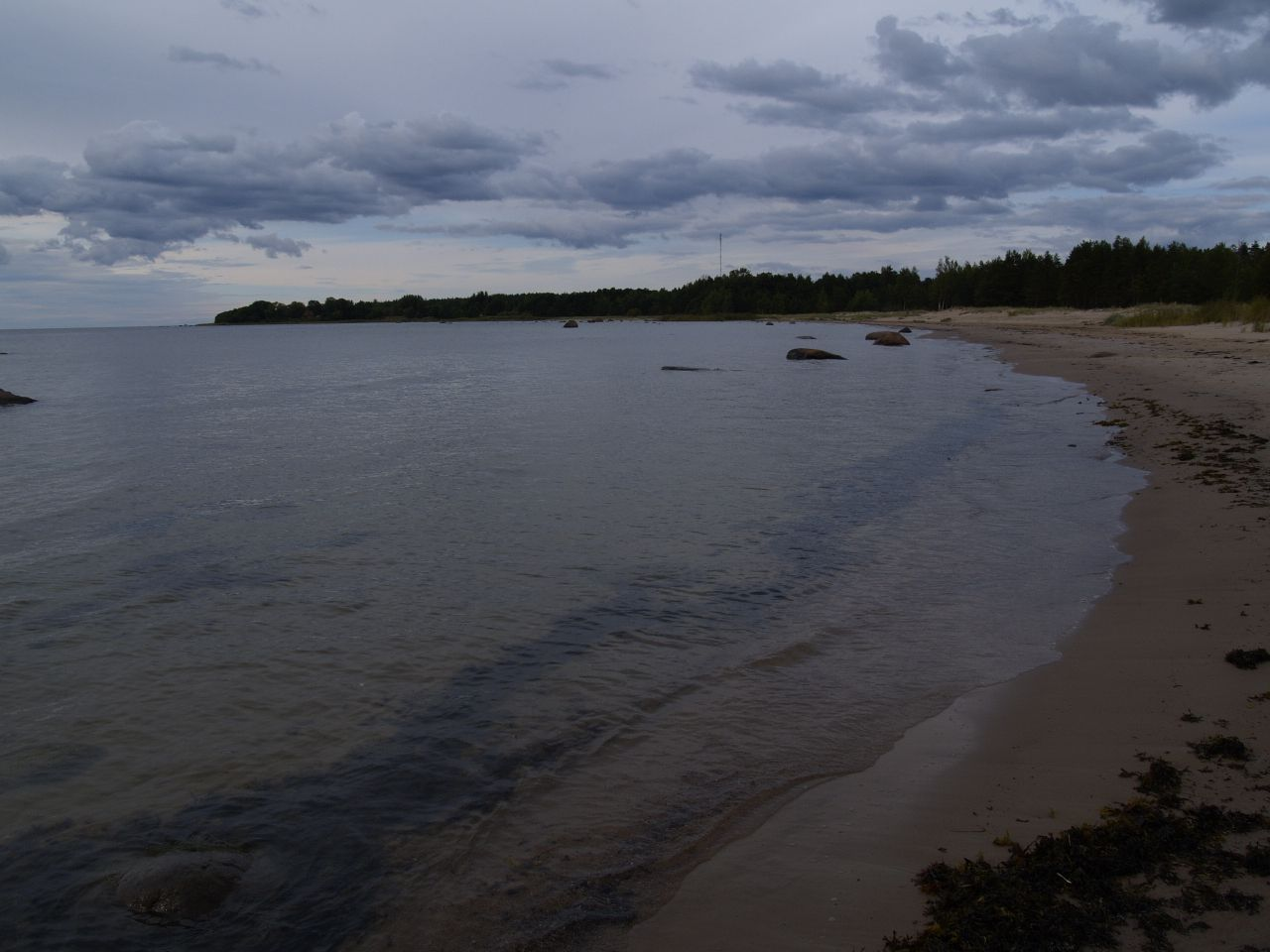
- Andineeme beach
- Interactive map of Andineeme
- Country: Estonia
- County: Harju County
- Parish: Kuusalu Parish
- Time zone: UTC+2 (EET)
  - Summer (DST): UTC+3 (EEST)

Andineeme is a village in Kuusalu Parish, Harju County in northern Estonia.

== Name ==
Andineeme was arrested in written sources as Antineme in 1823, Antinöm in 1871 (referring to the farm), and Andinömme in 1913 (referring to the village). There is a farm in the village called Andineeme, and this name was applied to the village in the early twentieth century, encompassing several scattered farms. The name of the farm is probably derived from that of the nearby cape, which was named after a resident: Andineem (literally, 'Anti's cape') < Andi (genitive of Anti 'Andreas') + neeme (genitive of neem 'cape').
