= Rain Tolk =

Estonian actor and film director

Rain Tolk (born 9 June 1977) is an Estonian actor, screenwriter and film director.

Tolk was born in Tallinn. Since 2002 he has been the director, screenwriter and producer in the company Kuukulgur Film.

== Selected film roles and directed films ==
- 2006 Tühirand (feature film; role: Mati)
- 2007 186 Kilometers (feature film; director, role: Hippie)
- 2007 Sügisball (feature film; role: Mati)
- 2008 Sauna (feature film; role: Rogosin)
- 2009 The Temptation of St. Tony (feature film; role: Kleine Willy)
- 2010 Sky Song (animated film; role: voice)
- 2017 Paha lugu: Kokkulepe (feature film; director)
- 2017 Paha lugu: Varakevad (feature film; director)
- 2017 Litsid (television series; role: Mister Tamm)
- 2017 Merivälja (television series; role: Kaabus Mees)
- 2017 Minu näoga onu (feature film; role: Hugo and Young Raivo)
- 2019 Kõhedad muinaslood (feature film)
- 2019 Ükssarvik (feature film; role: Businessman Per)
- 2020 Asjad, millest me ei räägi (feature film)
- 2022 Kalev (feature film; role: Journalist 1)
- 2025 Aurora (feature film; director)
