= Juhan Ulfsak =

Estonian actor

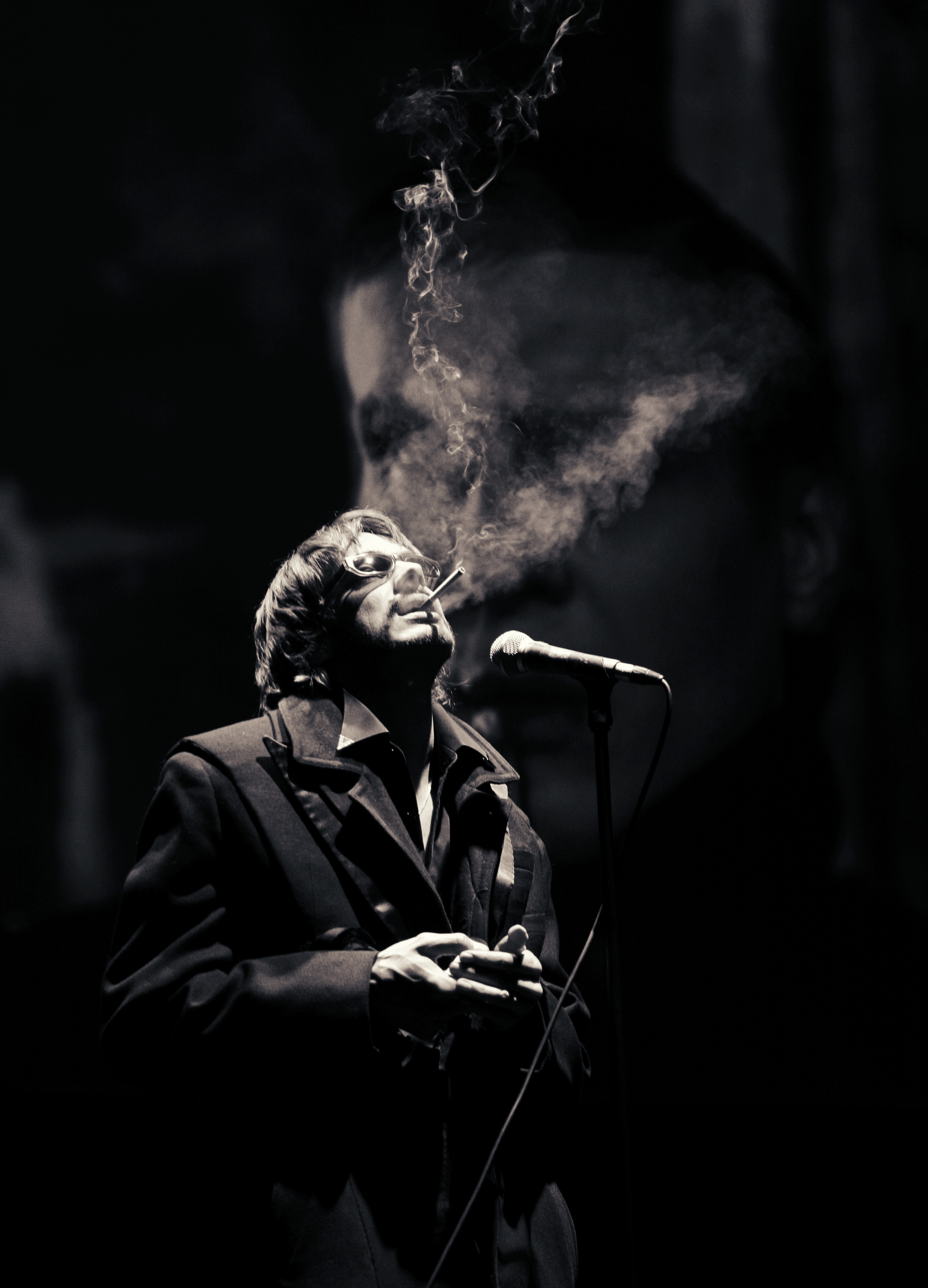
Juhan Ulfsak

Juhan Ulfsak (born 18 April 1973 in Tallinn) is an Estonian actor.

Since 1998 he has been an actor in the theatrical group at Von Krahl Theatre. He has also acted in several films, including Autumn Ball. His father was actor Lembit Ulfsak.

== Selected filmography ==
- 2005 Stiilipidu (feature film; role: Erki)
- 2006 The Power of Fear (feature fil; role: Head sheriff)
- 2006 Ruudi (feature film; role: Beauty contest host)
- 2007 Jan Uuspõld läheb Tartusse (feature film; role: Valev)
- 2011 Idioot (feature film; role: Ippolit)
- 2012 Seenelkäik (feature film; role: Zäk)
- 2012 Üksik saar (feature film; role: Olaf, professor's son)
- 2015 Roukli (feature film)
- 2016 Päevad, mis ajasid segadusse (feature film; role: Juulius)
- 2017 Mehetapja/Süütu/Vari (feature film; role: Aleksander Kross (Süütu))
- 2017 Miami (feature film; role: Eduard)
- 2018 Eia jõulud Tondikakul (feature film; role: Raiesmiku Raivo)
- 2018 Seltsimees laps (feature film; role: Paul Varik)
- 2020 Viimased (feature film; role: Butcher)
- 2022 Erik Kivisüda (feature film; role: Külmking)
- 2023 Tume paradiis (feature film; role: Renee)
- 2025 Ühemõõtmeline mees (feature film; role: Raul)
- 2026: Our Erika as Aksel – directed by German Golub
