= Kuukulgur Film =

Film studio based in Estonia

Kuukulgur Film (internationally known as Moonwalker Film) is an Estonian film studio. The studio has produced feature films, documentaries and advertisements.

Studio was established in 2003.

== Filmography ==
- 2006 "Tühirand"
- 2006 "Täkutallinn"
- 2006 "Müümise kunst"
- 2007 "Sügisball"
- 2007 "Jan Uuspõld läheb Tartusse"
- 2008 "Radikaal"
- 2008 "Fritsud ja blondiinid"
- 2009 "Väike puust linn"
- 2009 "Tõuteadur"
- 2009 "Suits"
- 2009 "Revolutsioon, mida ei tulnud"
- 2010 "Vanad kalad"
- 2010 "Tsirkusetuur"
- 2010 "Protsess"
- 2011 "Uus Maailm"
- 2011 "KUKU: Mina jään ellu"
- 2011 "Kormoranid ehk nahkpükse ei pesta"
- 2012 "Umbkotid"
- 2012 "Kümnest kümneni"
- 2013 "Karikakramäng II: Hõbepulm"
- 2013 "Karikakramäng II: Foto"
- 2014 "Prügi mahapanek keelatud!"
- 2014 "Kirsitubakas"
- 2015 "Viirusekandur"
- 2015 "Konnade tee"
- 2017 "Minu näoga onu"
- 2017 "Paha lugu: Varakevad"
- 2017 "Paha lugu: Nissan Patrol"
- 2017 "Paha lugu: Kokkulepe"
- 2018 "Paha lugu: Jõulumüsteerium"
