= Katrin Laur =

Estonian film director

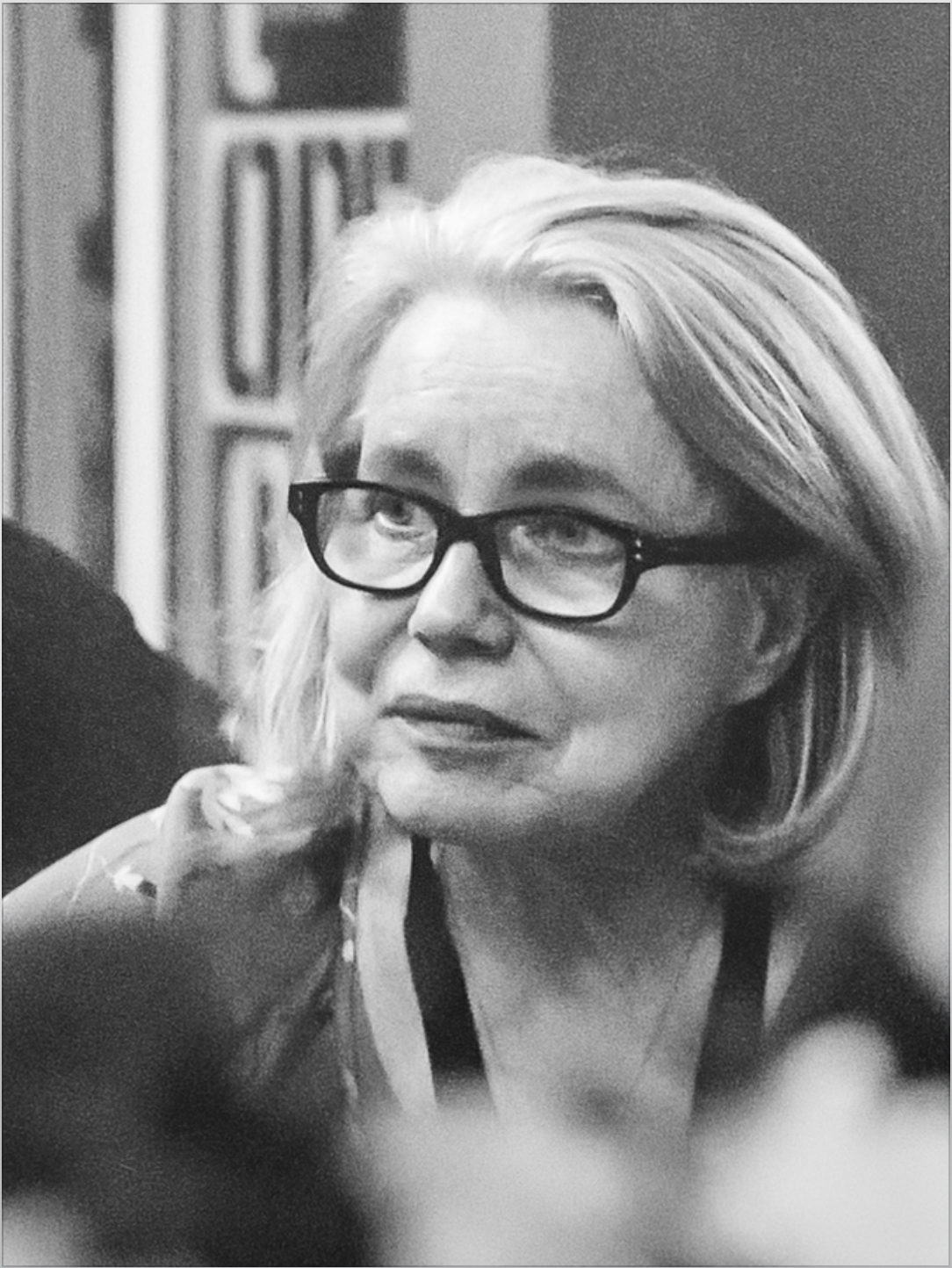
Katrin Laur

Katrin Laur (née Poola, born in 1955) is an author, film director and professor. She lives in Estonia and Germany.

== Biography ==
Laur was born in 1955 in Tartu, Estonian SSR. In 1973 in Soviet-occupied Tallinn she graduated from a school that gave an excellent command of English (Tallinn Secondary School N°7), she then had different jobs. Laur learned photography at the Tallinn Technical School N°2 and studied philosophy for one year at the Moscow State University. From 1977 to 1982 Laur studied feature film directing at the Moscow State Institute of Cinematography (VGIK), in the masterclass of Sergey Gerasimov, and graduated in 1982 with a diploma summa cum laude (diploma film: "Kolm tundi rongi väljumiseni" – "Three Hours before the Train leaves."). After graduating from the film school she left the Soviet Union with her then-husband, a Colombian fellow student, and their three-year-old daughter. She applied for political asylum in Munich, Germany, which was granted to her two years later. In Munich, she again worked different jobs, studied German at LMU Munich, and made a couple of documentaries for the Bavarian TV: 1987 – "Revolution aus dem Salon" – "Revolution from a Salon" – about Russian female dissidents.

From 1986 to 1994 she was a journalist at Radio Free Europe in Munich. In 1993, she published a collection of poetry "Sõnad" ("Words") (Tallinn: Kunst, 1993) In 1994 Laur moved to Berlin and took up filmmaking again, especially scriptwriting script consulting. For some years she lived in Zürich (Switzerland), where she made a documentary feature about Swiss long-distance lorry drivers „Die lange Reise des Reto Bantli“ („The long Journey of Reto Bantli“) 2002.

Since the beginning of 2000, she worked more and more in Estonia. Laur taught screenwriting at the Tallinn University Film- and Media School (BFM). Her interest in history and the way time shapes the lives of people manifests itself in two feature-length documentaries: „Debora Vaarandi aeg“ („Poet and her Time“), about a celebrated poet Debora Vaarandi (1916–2007), one of the people who supported the Soviet takeover in 1940 and was close to the regime throughout the Soviet occupation and who still wrote great poetry in her later years. In 2011 she made a documentary about Olav Roots (1910–1974), chief conductor of the Estonian National Symphony Orchestra from 1939 to 1944. Before the final Soviet takeover in 1944, Roots, like many Estonians, artists, in particular, immigrated to Sweden. Unable to find a proper use for his talent and work he accepted an offer from Colombia and worked as chief conductor of the Colombia Symphony Orchestra in Bogotá from 1952 until his death in 1974. Laur's film „Sada aastat sõda ja muusikat“ („One Hundred Years of War and Music“) (2011) restored Roots to his place in the history of Estonian music. She also made two feature films – „Ruudi“ (2007) and „Surnuaiavahi tütar“ (2011) „Graveyard Keeper’s Daughter“, which were both successful in Estonia and at international film festivals. From 2011 to 2021 Laur was a professor for dramaturgy and screenwriting at the Academy of Media Arts Cologne. In 2012, she was a Fulbright Visiting Scholar at Boston University - screenwriting and creative writing. In 2022 Laur's historical novel „Tunnistaja“ („The Witness“) was published. The events of the book take place from 1930 to 1942 in Estonia, Germany, and the Vatican and closely follow the fate of Europe. (Tallinn: Hea Lugu, 2022, 832 p.) 2023 Katrin Laur was awarded the prestigious Jaan Kross literary prize for "The Witness".

== Selected filmography ==
- 2006 Ruudi (feature film; director and scenarist)
- 2007 Debora Vaarandi aeg (documentary film; director, producer and scenarist)
- 2009 Vasha (feature film; scenarist)
- 2011 Roots - sada aastat sõda ja muusikat (documentary film; director, producer and scenarist)
- 2011 Surnuaiavahi tütar (feature film; director, scenarist and co-producer)
