= Hendrik Toompere Jr. =

Estonian actor and director

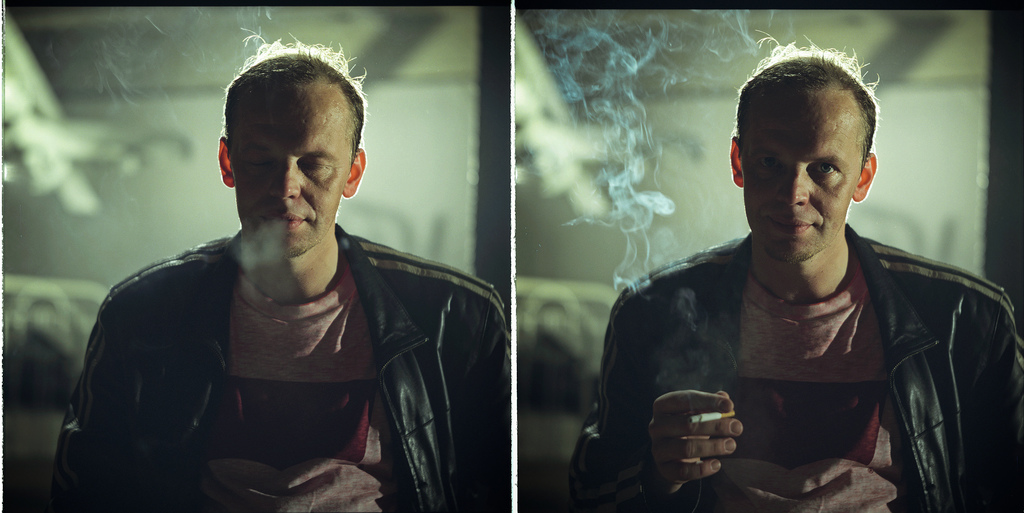
Toompere in 2007.

Hendrik Toompere Jr. (born 5 June 1965) is an Estonian actor and director.

Toompere was born in Tallinn to actor and director Hendrik Toompere Sr. and actress Maie Toompere (née Kruusenberg). His sister is actress Harriet Toompere and his son is actor Hendrik Toompere Jr. Jr. His maternal grandfather was wrestler Herman Kruusenberg.

In 1988, he graduated from Tallinn State Conservatory Stage Art Department. From 1988 until 1989 he worked at Noorsooteater. Since 1990 he is working at Estonian Drama Theatre. Between 1996 and 2003, he was the author and director of advertisements in the company Brand Sellers DDB. He has also worked as a course instructor at the Estonian Academy of Music and Theatre. Besides theatrical roles he has also played on several films. He is married to Viktoria and they have two children.

Awards:

- 1998: Ants Lauter Award
- 2016: Order of the White Star, IV class.

== Selected filmography ==
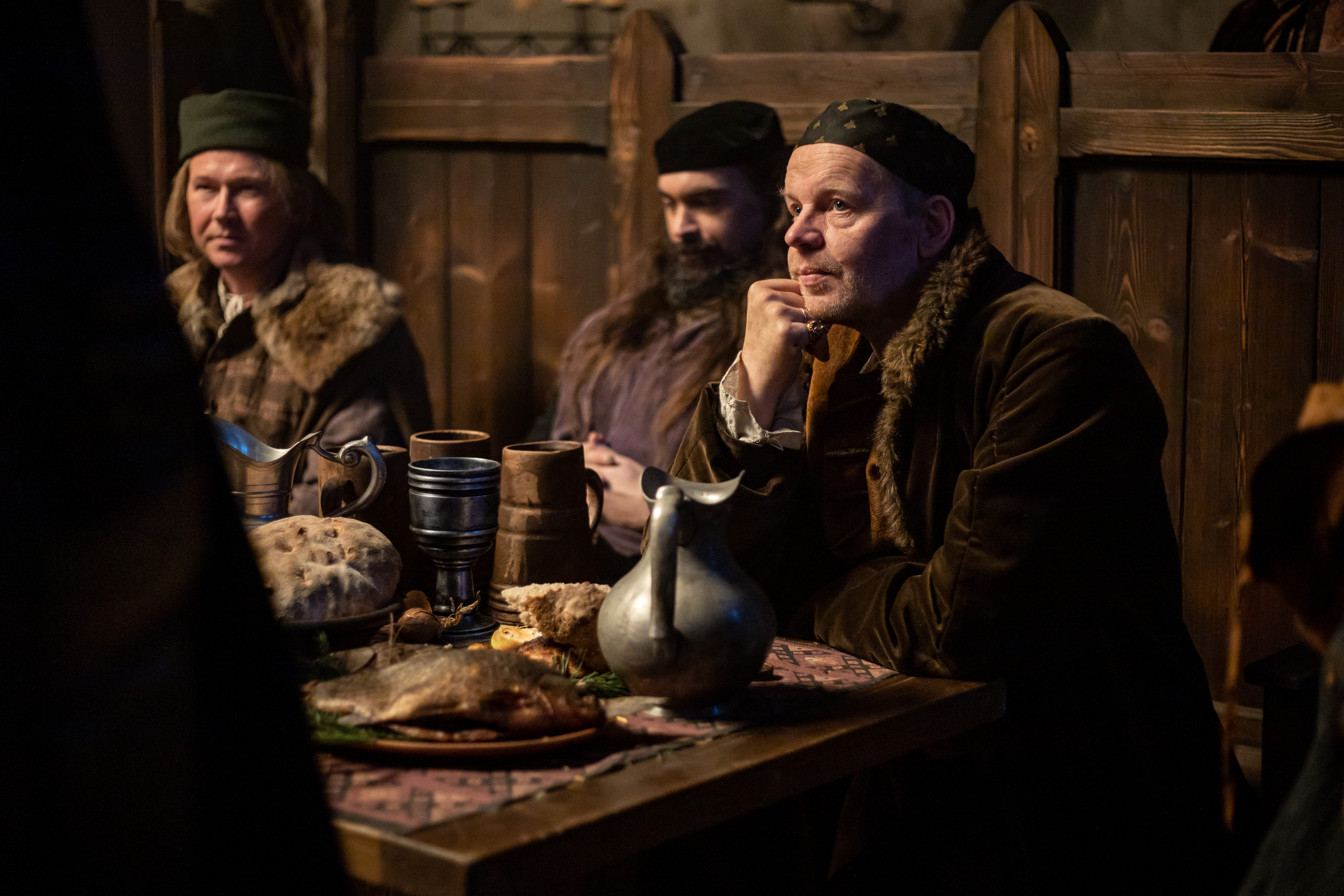
Toompere Jr. as the character Burckhart Casendrope during the filming of the 2020 film Melchoir the Apothecary

- 1985: Naerata ometi (role: Robi)
- 1987: Keskea rõõmud (role: Student Ott)
- 1991: Ainult hulludele ehk halastajaõde (role: Johan)
- 1999: Kass kukub käppadele (role: Florian)
- 2003: St Mercedes Day (role: Director)
- 2006: Vana daami visiit (role: Artist)
- 2006: Kuldrannake (role: Eugen)
- 2009: Püha Tõnu kiusamine (role: Toivo)
- 2016: The Days That Confused (role: Jaak)
- 2015: Vehkleja (role: School principal)
- 2016: Päevad, mis ajasid segadusse (role: Jaak)
- 2022: Apteeker Melchior (role: Casendrope)
- 2024: Biwa järve 8 nägu (role: Roman)
