= Aleksander Eelmaa =

Estonian actor (1946–2021)

Aleksander Eelmaa (6 November 1946 – 21 July 2021) was an Estonian actor.

Eelmaa was born in Viljandi. From 1968 to 1969 he studied at the Estonian SSR Theatre Association's pantomime studio. From 1976 to 1981 he was an actor at Estonian Youth Theatre, from 1981 to 1990 at Vanalinnastuudio, from 1990 to 2006 at Estonian Drama Theatre, from 2007 to 2015 at Tallinn City Theatre, and from 2015 again at Estonian Drama Theatre.

Besides theatrical roles he also played on several films (Agent Wild Duck, A Friend of Mine and Vana daami visiit) and television series (Tuulepealne maa and Õnne 13).

Eelmaa's children are actor and director Taavi Eelmaa and theatre artist Liisi Eelmaa.

Eelmaa died on 21 July 2021, at the age of 74 in Ohtla. He was appearing in the play Kadunud kodu at the Saueaugu Theatre Farm, which had premiered the night before his death.

== Awards ==
- 1984: Ants Lauter prize
- 2004 Order of the White Star, IV class.

== Selected filmography ==
- 1980: Metskannikesed
- since 1996: Õnne 13
- 2002: Ferdinand
- 2005: Vanameeste paradiis
- 2006: Ruudi
- 2011: Üks mu sõber
- 2012–2013: Tupiktänava mehed
