= The Temptation of St. Tony =

2009 Estonian film

- Estonia Poster
- Directed by: Veiko Õunpuu
- Written by: Veiko Õunpuu
- Produced by: Katrin Kissa
- Starring: Taavi Eelmaa
- Cinematography: Mart Taniel
- Edited by: Thomas Lagerman; Veiko Õunpuu
- Music by: Ülo Krigul
- Production companies: Homeless Bob Production; ATMO Media; Bronson Club
- Release date: 10 October 2009
- Running time: 110 minutes
- Countries: Estonia; Sweden; Finland
- Language: Estonian
- Budget: €983,080 ($1.4 million)

The Temptation of St. Tony (Estonian: Püha Tõnu kiusamine) is a 2009 Estonian film written and directed by Veiko Õunpuu, starring Taavi Eelmaa. The plot has been described as a black comedy and centers around a successful, middle aged man who becomes interested in questions about morality. The film was a co-production between companies from Estonia, Sweden and Finland.

== Cast ==
- Taavi Eelmaa as Tõnu
- Ravshana Kurkova as Nadezhda
- Tiina Tauraite as Tõnu's wife
- Sten Ljunggren as Herr Meister
- Denis Lavant as Count Dionysos Korzybski
- Hendrik Toompere Jr. as Toivo
- Katariina Lauk as Toivo's wife
- Harry Kõrvits as Director
- Taavi Teplenkov as Urbo
- Marika Barabanstsikova as Urbo's wife
- Rain Tolk as Kleine Willy
- Liis Lepik as Tõnu's child
- Valeri Fjodorov as Nadezhda's father
- Evald Aavik as Priest
- Andres Puustusmaa as Fence builder

== Awards and nominations ==
Markku Pätilä and Jaagup Roomet were nominated for Best Production Designers at the European Film Awards 2010 for their work on the film. The Temptation of St. Tony was selected as Estonia's submission for the Academy Award for Best Foreign Language Film at the 83rd Academy Awards, but it didn't make the final shortlist.

== See also ==
- List of Estonian submissions for the Academy Award for Best Foreign Language Film
- List of submissions to the 83rd Academy Awards for Best Foreign Language Film
- The Temptation of St. Anthony
- The temptation of St. Anthony in visual arts
