= Shop of Dreams =

2005 film

- Directed by: Peeter Urbla
- Written by: Peeter Urbla, Mo Blackwood
- Starring: Maarja Jakobson
- Release date: 14 April 2005
- Running time: 110 minutes
- Country: Estonia
- Language: Estonian

Shop of Dreams (Estonian: Stiilipidu) is a 2005 Estonian drama film directed by Peeter Urbla. It was selected as the Estonian entry for the Best Foreign Language Film at the 78th Academy Awards, but it was not nominated.

== Cast ==
- Maarja Jakobson as Alice
- Anne Reemann as Ada
- Evelin Võigemast as Jana
- Karol Kuntsel as Ivar
- Meelis Rämmeld as Andres
- Madis Kalmet as Edgar
- Marika Vaarik as Silvia
- Hannes Prikk as Bergvald
- Toomas Urb as Siimer
- Hannes Kaljujärv as Kalev
- Gerardo Contreras as Stjopa
- Andrus Joala as Stjopa Jr.
- Raivo E. Tamm as Toomas
- Lauri Kink as Rain
- Aarne Soro as Edur
- Juhan Ulfsak as Erki
- Sepo Seeman as Mr. Lõbu
- Ireen Kennik as Pussycat
- Ago Anderson as Lauri
- Marta Vaarik as Keit
- Mirtel Pohla as Administrative assistant #1
- Kristel Elling as Administrative assistant #
- Üllar Saaremäe as Jaan
- Rita Raave as Madame
- Erik Ruus as Vello
- Peeter Jakobi as Mr. Kask
- Mart Toome as Ingel

== See also ==
- List of submissions to the 78th Academy Awards for Best Foreign Language Film
- List of Estonian submissions for the Academy Award for Best International Feature Film
