= Autumn Ball =

2007 film by Veiko Õunpuu

- Directed by: Veiko Õunpuu
- Written by: Screenplay: Veiko Õunpuu; Novel: Mati Unt
- Produced by: Katrin Kissa
- Cinematography: Mart Taniel
- Edited by: Veiko Õunpuu
- Music by: Ülo Krigul
- Distributed by: Taska Film
- Release dates: 7 September 2007 (Venice); 13 September 2007 (Estonia); 3 June 2009 (United States)
- Running time: 127 minutes
- Country: Estonia
- Language: Estonian

Autumn Ball (Estonian: Sügisball) is a 2007 Estonian drama film directed by Veiko Õunpuu, adapted from Mati Unt's 1979 novel of the same name. The film depicts six desolate people of different yet similar fates in characteristically Soviet pre-fabricated housing units (khrushchyovka). It premiered at the 64th Venice International Film Festival, where it won the Horizon Award.

== Cast ==
- Rain Tolk as Mati
- Taavi Eelmaa as Theo
- Tiina Tauraite as Ulvi
- Maarja Jakobson as Laura
- Mirtel Pohla as Jaana
- Sulevi Peltola as August Kaski
- Iris Persson as Laura's daughter
- Juhan Ulfsak as Maurer
- Ivo Uukkivi as Laura's ex-husband
- Katariina Lauk as female conference visitor
- Paul Laasik as television repairman
