= Lembit Ulfsak =

Estonian actor

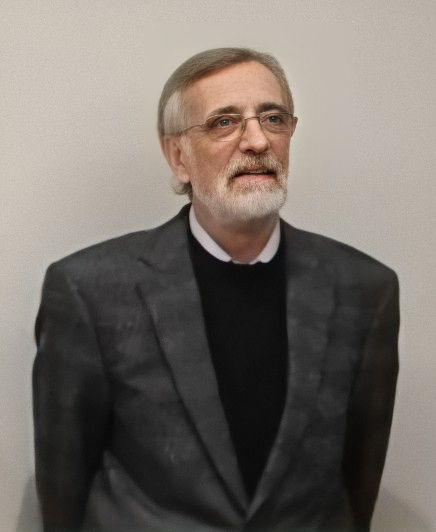
- Born: Lembit Ulfsak; 4 July 1947; Koeru, then part of Estonian SSR, Soviet Union
- Died: 22 March 2017 (aged 69); Tallinn, Estonia
- Education: Estonian Academy of Music and Theatre
- Occupation: Actor
- Years active: 1969–2017
- Children: 3, including Juhan Ulfsak

Lembit Ulfsak (4 July 1947 – 22 March 2017) was an Estonian stage and film actor. Ulfsak starred in the 2014 film Tangerines which was nominated for the Best Foreign Language Film at the 87th Academy Awards. It was also among the five nominated films at the 72nd Golden Globe Awards for Best Foreign Language Film. Ulfsak died on 22 March 2017, at the age of 69.

== Selected filmography ==
He has appeared in almost 100 films, among them:

- Ukuaru (1973)
- Legenda o Tile (1977)
- Karge meri (1981)
- Dear, Dearest, Beloved, Unique... (1984)
- TASS Is Authorized to Declare... (1984)
- Mary Poppins, Goodbye (1984)
- Sofia Kovalevskaya (1985)
- In Search of Captain Grant (1986)
- Ainult hulludele ehk halastajaõde (1990)
- Candles in the Dark (1993)
- Firewater (1994)
- Good Hands (2001)
- The Heart of the Bear (2001)
- Vedma (The Power of Fear) (2006)
- 186 Kilometres (2007)
- Lotte and the Moonstone Secret (2011)
- Ice Age (2002 film) Estonian version, voice cast for mammoth Manny (2012)
- Ice Age: The Meltdown Estonian version, voice cast
- Tangerines (2013)
- The Fencer (2015)
- The Eternal Road (2017)
