= Andres Puustusmaa =

Estonian film director and actor

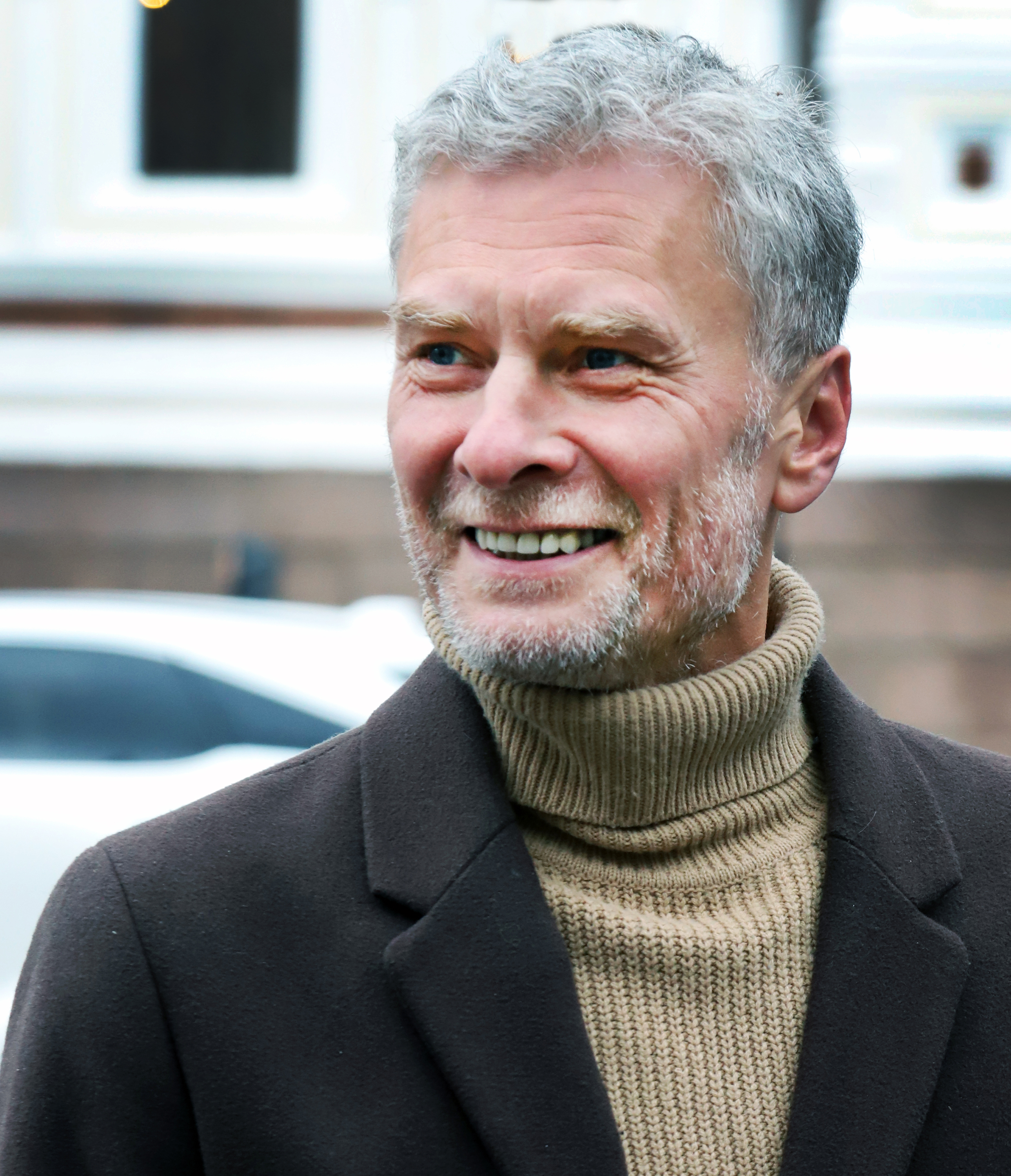
- Puustusmaa in 2024
- Born: 19 July 1971 (age 54); Tallinn, then part of Estonian SSR, Soviet Union
- Occupations: Film director, actor, screenwriter, academic, photographer
- Years active: 1993 – present
- Spouse: Natalja Murina (2001 – 2011; divorced)
- Children: 3

Andres Puustusmaa (born 19 July 1971) is an Estonian film director, actor, screenwriter, professor, and photographer who began his career in the early 1990s. He has worked extensively in his native Estonia, as well as in Russia.

== Early life and education ==
Andres Puususmaa was born in Tallinn to Tõnu and Eva Puustusmaa (née Mildeberg). After secondary school he enrolled in the Drama Department of Tallinn Conservatory (now, the Estonian Academy of Music and Theatre) under the instruction of theatre pedagogue Ingo Normet, graduating in 1994. Following his graduation from the Estonian Academy of Music and Theatre he joined the Estonian Drama Theatre in Tallinn, where he performed as a stage actor until 2002 when he relocated to Russia to study High Courses for Scriptwriters and Film Directors at the Gerasimov Institute of Cinematography in Moscow until 2004.

== Career ==
=== Actor ===
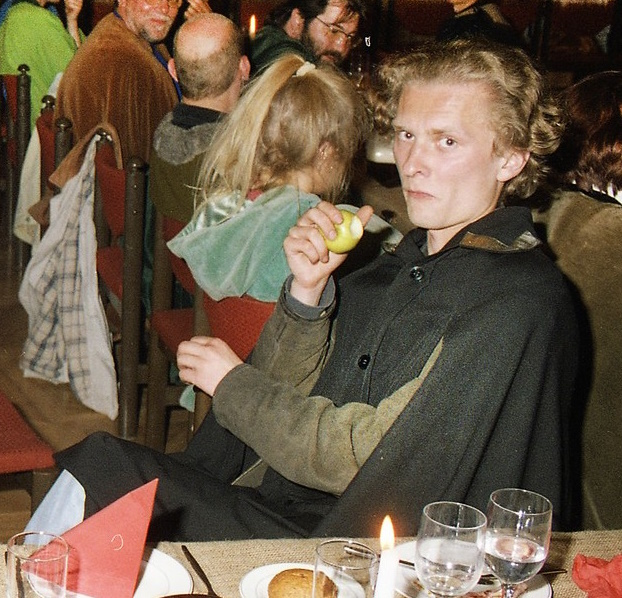
Puustusmaa in 1997

As well as performing onstage at the Estonian Drama Theatre, Puustusmaa has appeared as an actor on television and in film. One of his first television appearances was a small role was in the 1993 Maximilian Schell-directed American made for television drama Candles in the Dark, which was filmed on location in Tallinn. In 2001, he appeared on the popular, long-running Eesti Televisioon drama series Õnne 13.

Puustusmaa's first film role was a small part in the 1997 Hardi Volmer-directed historical comedy Minu Leninid. This was followed by roles in the 1999 Valentin Kuik-directed drama Lurjus, the 2009 Veiko Õunpuu-directed drama Püha Tõnu kiusamine, and the 2016 Anton Bilzho-directed Russian comedy Dreamfish, among others. He has also appeared in small roles in films that he has directed, such as 2011's crime drama Rotilõks and the 2017 drama Rohelised kassid.

=== Director ===
After graduation from the Gerasimov Institute of Cinematography, Puustusmaa worked as a film director in Russia for Mosfilm and Lenfilm. Some Russian-language features directed by Puustusmaa include: 1814 (2007), Krasnyy zhemchug lyubvi (2008), Volshebnik (2008), My iz budushchego 2 (2010), and Belyy pesok (2010).

Following his return to Estonia, he has continued to direct shorts and features, including: Rotilõks (2011), Rohelised kassid (2017), and Kohtunik (2018).

=== Educator ===
Since 2004, Andres Puustusmaa has been a lecturer in film and telecommunication at the Estonian Academy of Music and Theatre and from 2015, a professor at the institution.

== Personal life ==
Andres Puustusmaa was married to Estonian actress Natalja Murina from 2001 until their divorce in 2011. The couple have a son, Aleksander. Puustusmaa and his former common-law wife Katerina Monastyrskaya have one child named Leonard.

== Filmography ==
=== Actor ===
- Ühemõõtmeline meess – Agent (2025, feature film)
- Rohelised kassid – Politician (2017, feature film)
- Dreamfish – Kairo (2016, Russian feature film)
- Vahetus – Heiki (2011, film short)
- Rotilõks – Real estate agent (2011, feature film)
- The Temptation of St. Tony – Fence builder (2009, feature film)
- 1814 (2007, Russian feature film)
- Ferdinand (2002, film short)
- Õnne 13 – Töömees (2001, TV series)
- Lurjus – Berg (1999, feature film)
- Kõrbekuu – Hans Kaufmann (1999, film short)
- Minu Leninid (1997, feature film)
- Candles in the Dark (1993, American TV film)

=== Director ===
- Ühemõõtmeline mees (2025, Estonian)
- Siis kui elu maitses hästi (2024, Estonian TV series)
- Akula (2022, Russian TV series)
- Kohtunik (2019, Estonian)
- Libertas (2018, Estonian)
- Rohelised kassid (2017, Estonian)
- Wandering Roots (2017, Estonian short)
- Caché (2017, Estonian short)
- Varshava (2016, Russian)
- Mustad lesed (2015, Estonian TV series)
- Chuzhaya zhizn (2014, Russian TV series)
- Rotilõks (2011, Estonian)
- Belyy pesok (2010, Russian)
- Punane elavhõbe (2010, Estonian)
- My iz budushchego 2 (2010, Russian)
- Volshebnik (2008, Russian)
- Krasnyy zhemchug lyubvi (2008, Russian)
- 1814 (2007, Russian)
- Febris (1997, Estonian short)
- Süü (1997, Estonian short)
