= Peeter Urbla =

Estonian film director and producer

Peeter Urbla (born 2 June 1945 in Türi) is an Estonian film director, producer, and screenwriter.

In 1969, he graduated from the University of Tartu in art history. In 1977, he finished a two-year program for screenwriters and directors in Moscow.

From 1976 to 1989, he worked as a film director and screenwriter at Tallinnfilm and at Eesti Telefilm. In 1992, he founded the independent film studio Exitfilm.

== Selected filmography ==
- Daam autos (1992)
- Balti armastuslood (1994)
- Agent Wild Duck (2002, producer)
- Lilya 4-ever (2002, associate producer)
- Shop of Dreams (2005)
- Vana daami visiit (2006, producer)
- Camino (2011)
- Klassikaaslased 1943 (2012)
- Dora Gordine: Ars gratia artis (2014)
- Liblikmees (2015)
- Mausoleum (2016)
- Tiit Pääsuke ja tembitud värvid (2016)
- Pööripäev (2018)
- Noored piiril (2019)
- Cerberus (2020)
- Hüvasti, NSVL (2020, producer)
