= Rainer Sarnet =

Estonian film director (b. 1969)

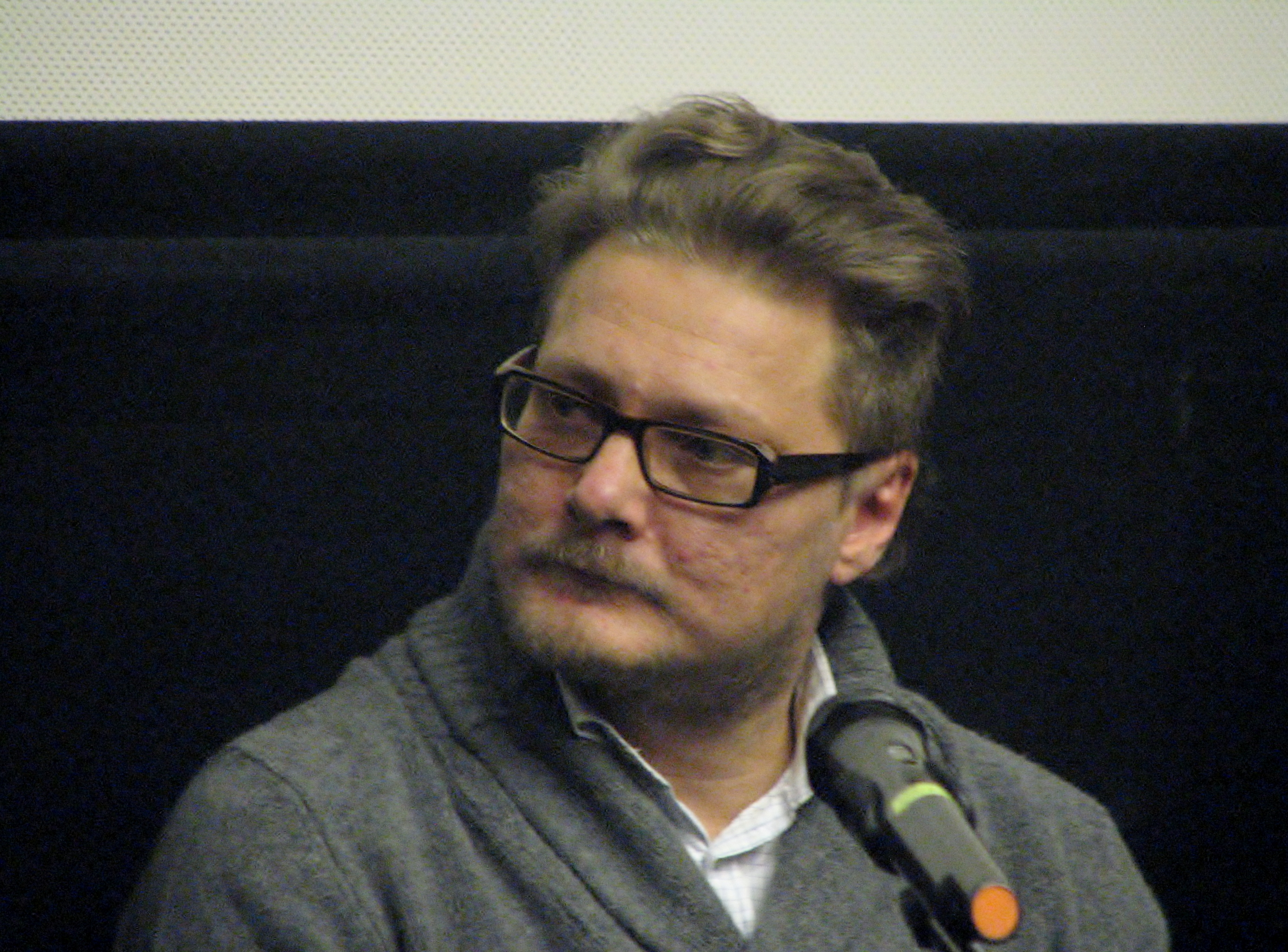
- Rainer Sarnet performing during 16th Tallinn Black Nights Film Festival
- Born: Rainer Sarnet; March 3, 1969 (age 57); Rakvere, then part of Estonian SSR, Soviet Union
- Occupations: Director, writer
- Years active: 1998–present

Rainer Sarnet (born 3 March 1969) is an Estonian film director and screenwriter whose visually stylised features draw on folklore, genre cinema and literary classics. He gained international attention with the black-and-white folk-horror film November (2017) and consolidated his reputation at the 76th Locarno Film Festival with the kung-fu comedy The Invisible Fight (2023).

== Early life and education ==
Sarnet was born in Rakvere and developed an early interest in both animation and literature.

He studied film direction at the Baltic Film and Media School of Tallinn University, which lists him among its distinguished alumni.

Before turning to feature films he worked as an animator and director of television commercials, experience critics say still informs his eclectic visual style.

== Career ==
=== Cinema ===
Sarnet’s first feature Where Souls Go (2007) announced a preoccupation with spiritual themes, while The Idiot (2011) transplanted Dostoevsky’s novel to contemporary Estonia. It was screened at the Tallinn Black Nights EurAsia competition.

November (2017), adapted from Andrus Kivirähk’s novel, premiered at the Tribeca Film Festival, where cinematographer Mart Taniel won the Best Cinematography award. The picture became Estonia’s submission for Best International Feature at the 90th Academy Awards but did not make the shortlist. Taniel’s monochrome images later received the American Society of Cinematographers Spotlight Award.

With the docu-fiction hybrid The Diary of Vaino Vahing (2021) Sarnet turned to Estonian intellectual history, earning praise at the Tallinn Black Nights Baltic Film Competition.

The Invisible Fight (2023) mixed kung-fu, heavy-metal and Orthodox mysticism; it premiered in competition at Locarno on 11 August 2023 and opened theatrically in Estonia on 7 December 2023. The film went on to win Best Film at the 2024 Estonian Film and Television Awards.

=== Theatre work ===
Parallel to filmmaking, Sarnet has staged productions at Tallinn’s Von Krahl Theatre, including Stanisław Przybyszewski’s Snow (2005), Maxim Gorky’s Mother (2005) and Elfriede Jelinek’s satirical sequel to A Doll’s House (2008).

== Filmography ==
| Year | Title | Original title | Release date |
|---|---|---|---|
| 2007 | Where Souls Go | Kuhu põgenevad hinged | 2007 |
| 2011 | The Idiot | Idioot | 2011 |
| 2017 | November | Rehepapp ehk November | 24 April 2017 (Tribeca premiere) |
| 2021 | The Diary of Vaino Vahing | Vaino Vahingu päevaraamat | 23 November 2021 |
| 2023 | The Invisible Fight | Nähtamatu võitlus | 7 December 2023 |

== Awards and recognition ==
Rainer Sarnet earned 11 wins and 10 nominations across various international and Estonian film awards. For his film November (2017), Sarnet won the Estonian Film and Television Awards (EFTA) for Best Director and Best Estonian Film, the Riga International Film Festival (RIGA IFF) Award for Best Film, the New Mexico Film Critics (NMFC) Award for Best Original Screenplay, the Splendid Palace People's Choice Award, and the International Fantasy Film Award's Special Jury Prize. He was also nominated for the Jury Award for Best International Narrative Feature and the Prix Sauvage for Best Feature Film, among others. For The Invisible Fight (2023), Sarnet was nominated for the Golden Leopard for Best Film, the New Visions Award for Best Motion Picture, the Lubina for Feature Film Competition, and the Free Spirit Award. In 2024, he won the EFTA for Best Screenplay and was nominated for Best Director for The Invisible Fight. For Vaino Vahingu päevaraamat (2021), Sarnet won the EFTA for Best Director and Best Documentary Feature in 2022.
