= Mait Malmsten =

Estonian actor (born 1972)

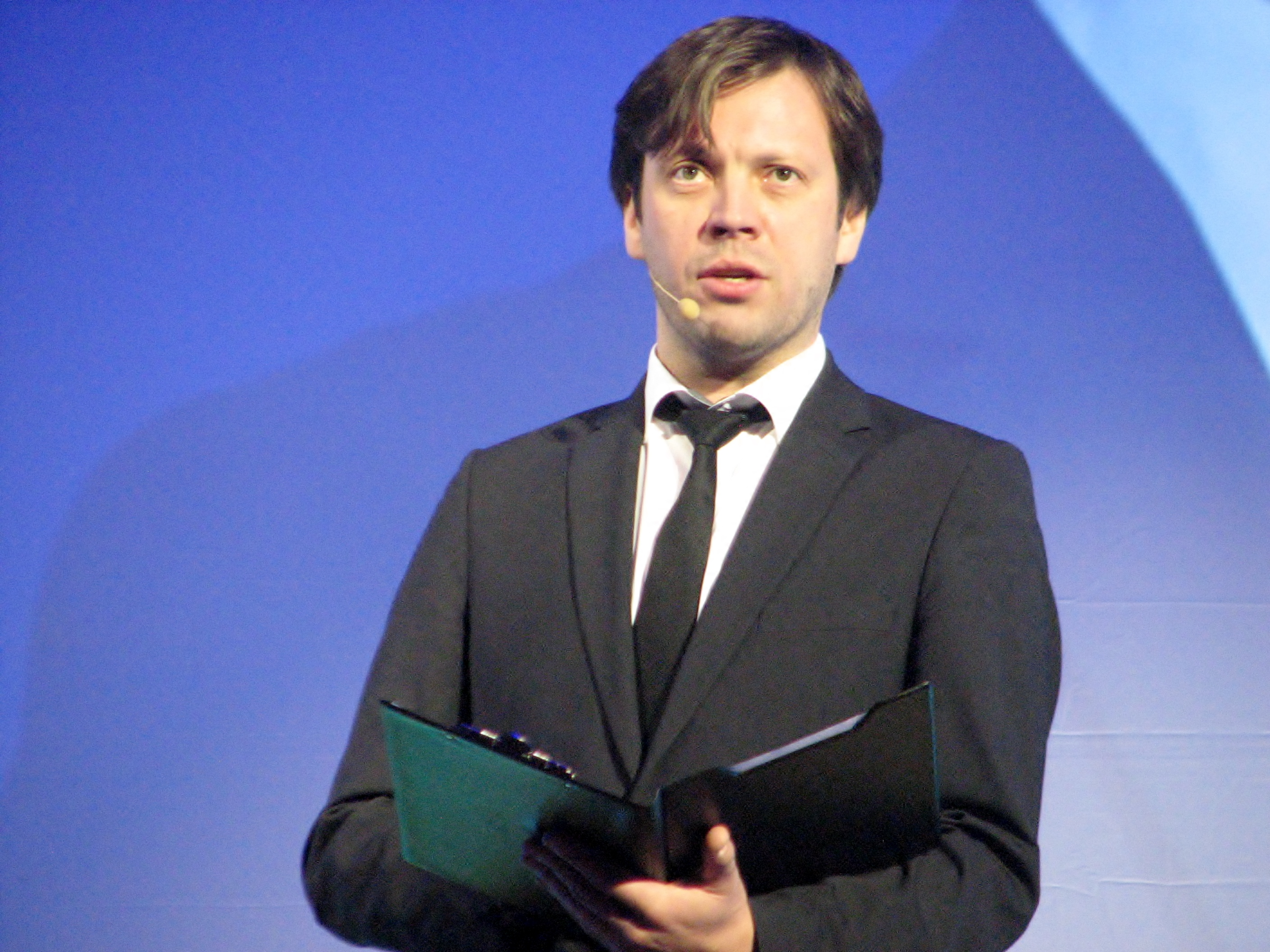
Mait Malmsten

Mait Malmsten (born 6 September 1972 in Viljandi) is an Estonian actor.

Malmsten comes from a family of actors. His father is actor Rein Malmsten. His paternal grandparents were actors Franz Malmsten and Eva Meil. His great-uncle was actor Hugo Malmsten and his great-aunt was actress Lydia Bock.

In 1994 he graduated from the Estonian Academy of Music and Theatre.

Since 1993 he is working as an actor in Estonian Drama Theatre. Besides theatrical appearances he is also played in numerous films and television series, e.g. Wikmani poisid. He is married to actress Harriet Toompere and the couple have two sons, Franz and Hugo, who are also both television and film actors.

== Selected filmography ==
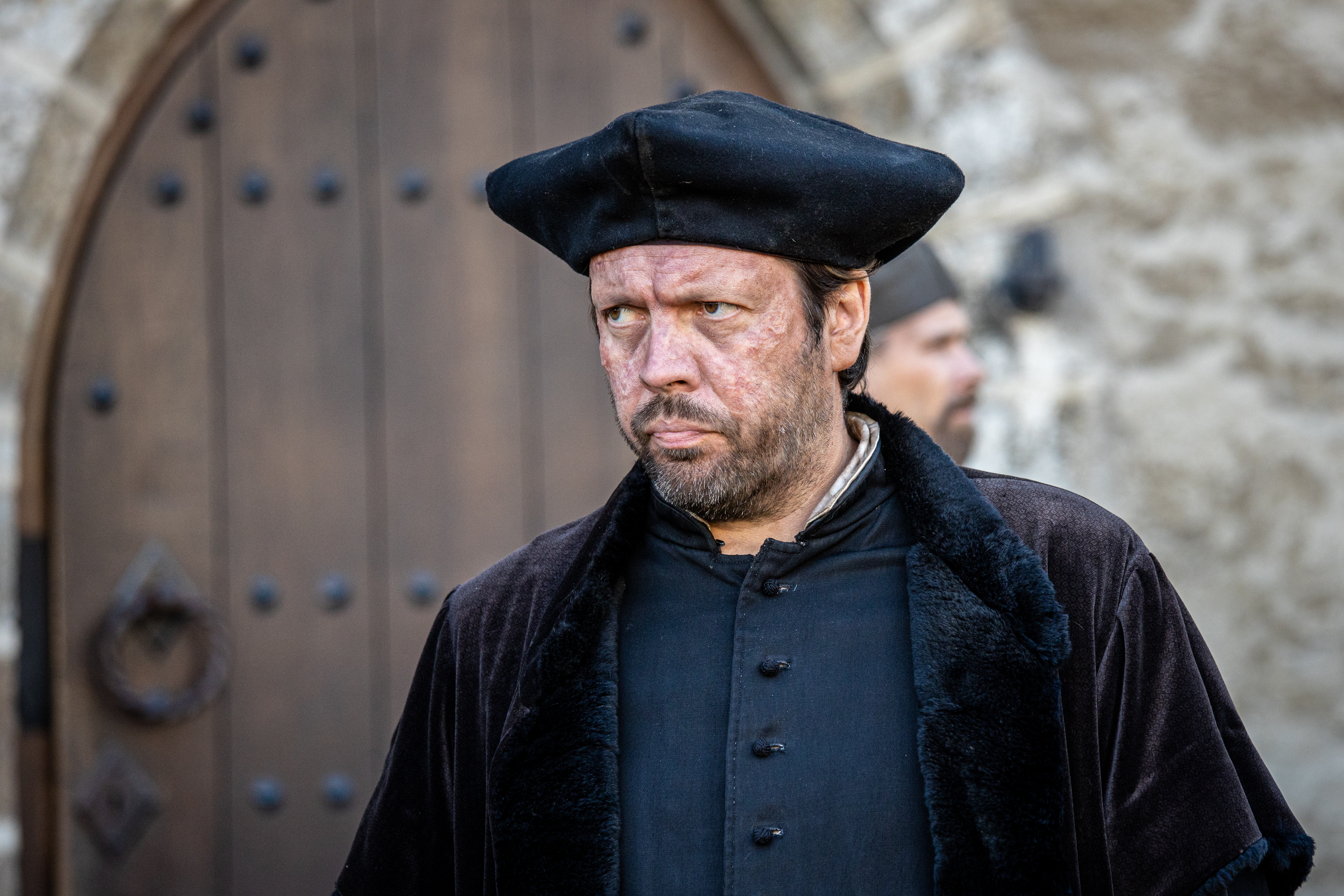
Malmsten as Rode in the 2022 film Melchior the Apothecary

- Agent Wild Duck (Estonian: Agent Sinikael) (2002)
- Lotte from Gadgetville (Estonian: Leiutajateküla Lotte) (2006)
- 186 Kilometres (Estonian: Jan Uuspõld läheb Tartusse) (2007)
- December Heat (Estonian: Detsembrikuumus) (2008)
- Lotte and the Moonstone Secret (Estonian: Lotte ja kuukivi saladus) (2011)
- Kertu (2013)
- 1944 (2015)
- Seneca's Day (Lithuanian: Senekos diena) (2016)
- Class Reunion (Estonian: Klassikokkutulek) (2016)
- Take It or Leave It (Estonian: Võta või jäta) (2018)
- Lotte and the Lost Dragons (Estonian: Lotte ja kadunud lohed) (2019)
- Melchior the Apothecary (Estonian: Apteeker Melchior) (2022)
- Stairway to Heaven (Estonian: Taevatrepp) (2023)
- Totally Boss (Estonian: Tähtsad ninad) (2023)
- Perfect Strangers (Estonian: Täiuslikud võõrad) (2026)
