= Exitfilm =

Movie studio

Exitfilm is an Estonian movie studio established in 1992 that produces and distributes feature films, short films and documentaries.

Exitfilm's international co-productions include Lilja 4-Ever by Lukas Moodysson (Sweden), Unforgettable by Anders Rønnow Karlund (Denmark) and Rothschild’s Violin by Edgardo Cozarinsky (France).

On the list of Estonian feature films produced would be the Shop of Dreams (Estonian: Stiilipidu) in 2005 co-produced with Finland, directed by Peeter Urbla, one of the founders of Exitfilm.
Agent Wild Duck (2002) co-produced with Zentropa in Denmark, was directed by Marko Raat.
