= Veiko Õunpuu =

Estonian film director

Veiko Õunpuu (born 16 March 1972, in Saaremaa) is an Estonian film director and screenwriter who is best known for his artistic movies Autumn Ball (Sügisball, 2007) and The Temptation of St. Tony (Püha Tõnu kiusamine, 2009). Õunpuu's films are usually slow-paced artistic movies with eccentric characters.

== Film work ==
In 2006 he wrote and directed the independent short film Empty (Tühirand). In 2007 he adapted Mati Unt's novel Autumn Ball (Sügisball) that won the Horizon Award at the 64th Venice International Film Festival, which remains the highest international recognition an Estonian film has ever received.

In 2010 Õunpuu's second feature drama The Temptation of St. Tony (Püha Tõnu kiusamine) screened in Sundance Film Festival. The film was selected as Estonia's submission for the Academy Award for Best Foreign Language Film at the 83rd Academy Awards, but it didn't make the final shortlist.

His third feature "Free Range" Premiered at 2014 Berlin International Film Festival and fourth "Roukli"(2015) at 28th Tokyo International Film Festival in 2016. "Free Range" was selected as the Estonian entry for the Best Foreign Language Film at the 86th Academy Awards, but it was not nominated.

Õunpuu has also done two stage directions in NO99 theatre in Tallinn. In 2010 Rainer Werner Fassbinder's play "City, Garbage and Death" and in 2016 Bertolt Brecht's "Mother Courage".

== Filmography ==
Director

- The Last Ones (2020)
- Roukli (2015)
- Free Range (2013)
- The Temptation of St. Tony (2009) (Püha Tõnu kiusamine)
- Autumn Ball (2007) (Sügisball)
- Empty (2006) (Tühirand) (short film).

== Awards ==
Venice Film Festival

- Won: Venice Horizon Award for Autumn Ball (2007) (Sügisball)

Sundance Film Festival

- Nominee: Grand Jury Prize - World Cinema - Dramatic for The Temptation of St. Tony (2007) (Püha Tõnu kiusamine)

Karlovy Vary International Film Festival

- Won: East of West Award - Special Mention for The Temptation of St. Tony (2007) (Püha Tõnu kiusamine)
