= Ergo Kuld =

Estonian director and operator

Ergo Kuld (born 23 August 1976) is an Estonian film director, cinematographer and producer.

Kuld was born in Tartu. In 1994, he graduated from Kullamaa Secondary School. Between 1998 and 2000, he studied photography at the Baltic Film and Media School in Tallinn and from 2000 until 2004 at Tallinn University as a cinematographer. In 2000, he worked as a photographer for the newspapers Äripäev and Postimees, and from in 2000 until 2002, as a photo editor for Postimees.

In 2019, Kuld's partner, actress and singer Grete Klein, gave birth to a daughter. In 2020, the couple wed.

== Filmography ==
- 2015 Varjudemaa
- 2016 Doktor Silva
- 2016 Papad mammad
- 2017 Lillepood
- 2017 Nukumaja
- 2018 Miks mitte
- 2019 Lahutus Eesti moodi
- 2019 Reetur
- 2019 Talve
- 2020 Tulejoonel
- 2021 Jahihooaeg
- 2022 Soo
- 2023 Suvitajad
- 2023 Vigased pruudid
- 2023 Valetamisklubi
- 2026 Säärane mulk

Source: EFIS
