= Andres Maimik =

Estonian film director (born 1970)

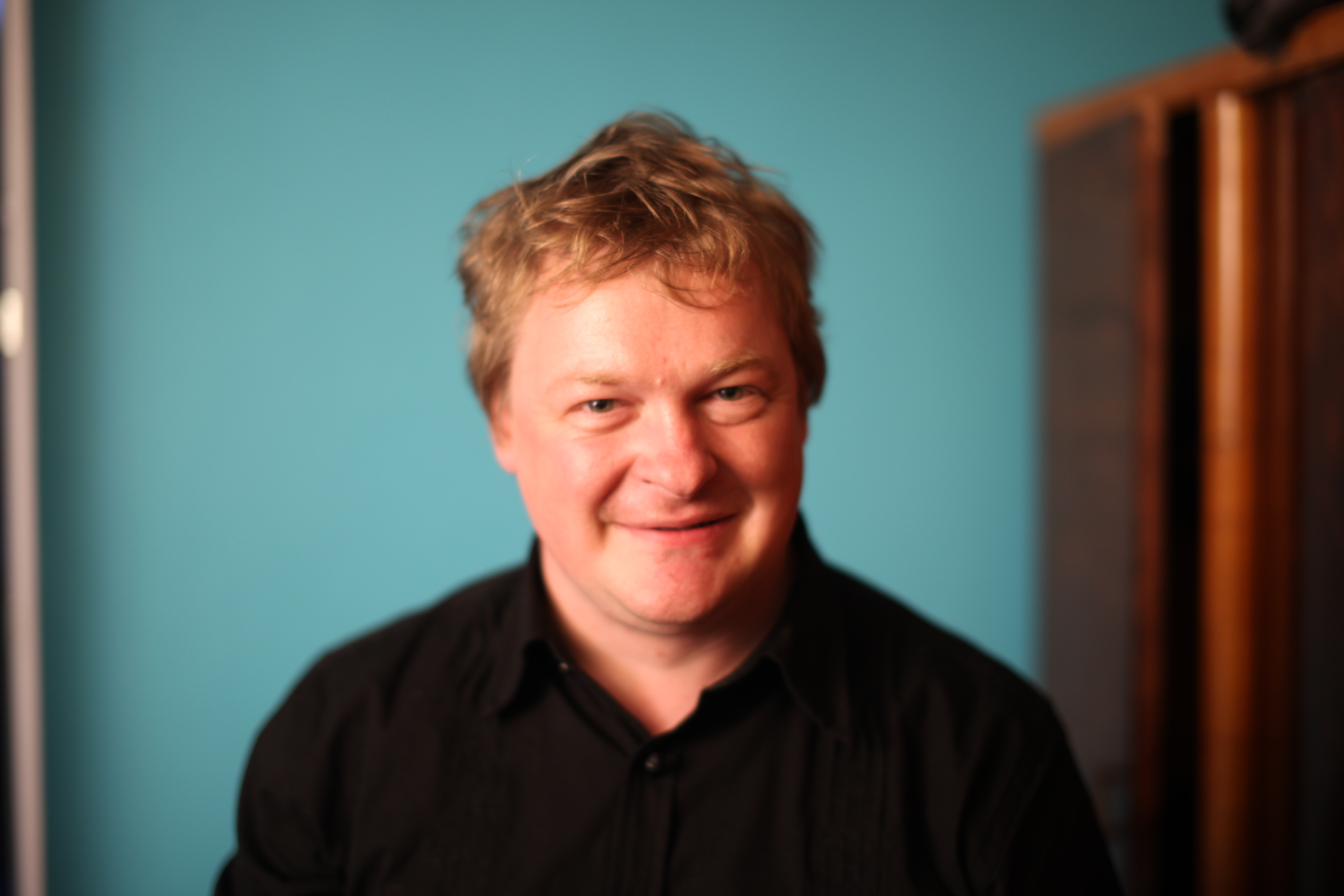
- Maimik in 2009
- Born: 8 February 1970 (age 56); Tallinn, then part of Estonian SSR, Soviet Union
- Occupations: Film director; producer; screenwriter; cinematographer; actor
- Awards: Estonian Film Critics Award

Andres Maimik (born 8 February 1970) is an Estonian film director, producer, screenwriter, cinematographer and actor. His first feature film, the political satire Vali kord won the Estonian Film Critics Award in 2004.

== Selected filmography ==
- 2002 Agent Wild Duck (feature film; screenwriter)
- 2004 Vali kord (feature film; director and screenwriter)
- 2006 Jan Uuspõld läheb Tartusse (feature film; director and screenwriter)
- 2010 Taevalaul (animated film; role: voice)
- 2014 Kirsitubakas (eng.: Cherry Tobacco)(feature film; director and scenarist)
- 2016 Luuraja ja luuletaja (feature film; director and screenwriter)
- 2016 Päevad, mis ajasid segadusse (feature film; in role: Margus)
- 2017 Minu näoga onu (eng.: The Man who looks like me) (feature film; director and scenarist)
- 2017 Paha lugu: Kokkulepe (eng.: A Bad Scene: Christmas Mystery) (short film collection; director and screenwriter)
- 2021 Sassis (director and screenwriter)
- 2025 Aurora (feature film; director and screenwriter)
- 2025 Jan Uuspōld läheb koju (eng.: Jan Uuspōld Goes Home) (feature film; director and screenwriter)
