= Allfilm =

Film production company based in Estonia

Allfilm is an Estonian movie studio established in 1995.

Since Allfilm's establishment in 1995, its main activities have included producing features, documentaries, TV-commercials, TV-series, music videos and promotional films.

Allfilm also provides production services for features, documentaries and TV-commercials from Nordic countries, United Kingdom and the US.

Allfilm is a member of the Association of Estonian Film Producers and International Quorum of Motion Picture Producers.
