= Von Krahl Theatre =

Theatre in Tallinn, Estonia

- Von Krahli Teater
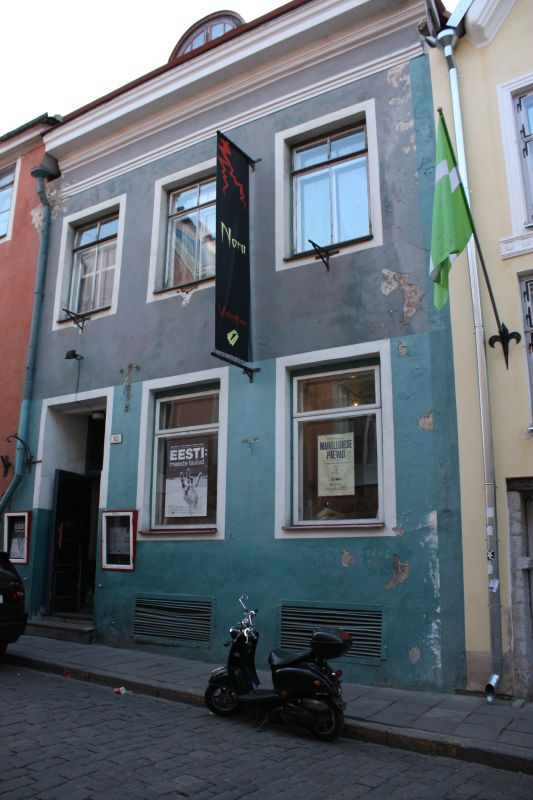
- Von Krahl Theatre.
- Interactive map of Von Krahl Theatre
- Address: Telliskivi street 60a-9, 10412, Tallinn, Estonia
- Location: Tallinn, Estonia
- Coordinates: 59°26′14″N 24°44′33″E

Website
- vonkrahl.ee

Von Krahl Theatre (Estonian: Von Krahli teater) is a theatre in Tallinn, Estonia. The theatre directors are Juhan Ulfsak and Jaak Prints

The theatre is established in 1992 by Peeter Jalakas and his theatrical group "Ruto Killakund".

The theatre's hall has about 100 seats.
