= Beretta M1918 =

Beretta Model 1918
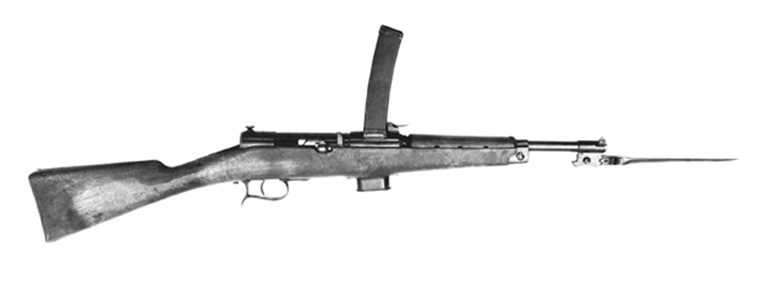
- Type: Semi-automatic carbine Submachine gun (prototype variant only)
- Place of origin: Kingdom of Italy

Service history
- Used by: See Users
- Wars: World War I Second Italo-Ethiopian War; Spanish Civil War; World War II

Production history
- Designed: 1917-1918
- Manufacturer: Beretta
- Developed from: Villar Perosa submachine gun
- No. built: ~5,000 (M1918 variant only)
- Variants: "Bigrillo" Model; Model 1918/30

Specifications
- Mass: 7 lb 3 oz (3.3 kg)
- Length: 43 in (1092 mm)
- Barrel length: 12 in (305 mm)
- Cartridge: Glisenti M.915 Per Mitragliatrici; 9mm Parabellum
- Caliber: 9mm
- Action: Blowback, semiautomatic only.
- Muzzle velocity: 1,275 ft/s (389 m/s)
- Feed system: 25 round detachable box. 12 or 25 round detachable box magazine (1918/30)

The Moschetto Automatico Revelli-Beretta Mod. 1915 (commonly known as the Beretta Model 1918) was a self-loading carbine that entered service in 1918 with the Regio Esercito. Designed as a semi-automatic carbine, the weapon came with an overhead inserted magazine, an unconventional design based on the simplicity of allowing a spent round to be replaced using assistance from gravity. The gun was made from half of a Villar-Perosa aircraft submachine gun.

Like all weapons of the Villar Perosa family, including the O.V.P. submachine gun it was originally intended to fire a variant of the 9mm Glisenti cartridge, known as Glisenti M.915 "Per Mitragliatrici" ("For Machine-Guns"). This was a higher-velocity version of the standard Glisenti cartridge with an over-powder wad, designed to improve the penetration abilities of the weak base cartridge.

== Design ==
- Barrel rifling: 6 grooves with a right-hand twist (6-right)
- Semiautomatic carbine, cal. 9mm, having a barrel length of 12.5" and a magazine capacity of 25 rounds.

== Variants ==
=== Mod.1918/30 ===
In the 1930s, the semi-automatic Mod.1918/30 model was developed; It completely revamped the action of the gun, replacing the delayed-blowback Villar Perosa action with a new closed-bolt system with a loose firing pin that was cocked by a guided rod protruding from the rear of the receiver, with a ring-shaped cocking piece. This earned the gun the nickname "Il Siringone" ("The Syringe"). The magazine feed was also revamped, now taking straight box magazines from the underside of the receiver. The folding bayonet was retained on most models. Few examples of the Model 1918 survive, since the Mod.1918/30 was produced by converting existing Mod.1918s.

=== MIDA ===
While the standard Revelli-Beretta carbine was a semi-automatic weapon only, several experimental variants were developed with selective-fire capability. Most of these were not made at Beretta, but at Manifattura Italiana d'Armi (MIDA) in Brescia, and may have been designed by Alfredo Scotti. These included twin-trigger "bigrillo" models which gave automatic fire on their rear triggers and single fire from their forward triggers. This type of trigger group became standard on later Beretta submachine guns, including the well-known Model 38 series. Apart from the trigger system, the MIDA variants also differed from the standard Beretta in most of their components, with different stocks, sights, magazine release catches, ejection chutes, and bayonet mounts that took the detachable Carcano TS bayonet rather than the folding cavalry bayonet. One MIDA-made experimental model also incorporated a right-canted magazine feed; the reason for this is unknown. Although a small lot of twin-trigger MIDA submachine guns are known to have been produced, they were probably never taken into service. The exact reason for the development of the MIDA submachine gun is still not entirely known but it was probably for a special military contract from some unit that desired a variant of the Revelli-Beretta carbine with automatic fire capability.

== Users ==
- Italy
- Albania
- Argentina: Beretta 1918/30 in 9mm Parabellum adopted in 1933 by the Federal Police, and Buenos Aires Provincial Police
- Ethiopia: Surplus mod.1915 and mod.1918/30 were bought from Italy and issued to the Kebur Zabagna, possibly some were also shipped to Eritrea and captured by the Ethiopians
- Saudi Arabia: Purchased surplus Carbines, possibly around 1938

=== Non-state entities ===
- La Cagoule: A number of Mod.1918/30 carbines were smuggled by OVRA in exchange for favours to the Italian government.

== See also ==
- Hafdasa C-4, an Argentine derivative of the Beretta Model 1918/30.
- OVP 1918, another Italian submachine gun made from half of a Villar-Perosa that was produced at the same time as the Beretta Model 1918 by Officine di Villar Perosa.
- Italian submachine guns
- Owen gun, an Australian submachine gun also using a toploading design.
