= OVP =

OVP may refer to:

== Politics ==
- Office of the Vice President of the United States
- Office of the Vice President of the Philippines
- Austrian People's Party (Österreichische Volkspartei)

== Other ==
- Officine di Villar Perosa, an Italian firearm maker who developed the Villar Perosa aircraft submachine gun and the OVP 1918
- Online video platform, enables users to upload, convert, store and play back video content on the Internet
- Overvoltage protection, in a power supply
- Open Virtual Platforms OVPsim, for simulating electronic systems

== See also ==
- ÖVP
