= Adolf Zilmer =

Estonian politician

Adolf Zilmer (also Zillmer; born 21 September 1891, Vaabina Parish (now Antsla Parish), Kreis Werro – died 16 March 1936, Tallinn) was an Estonian politician. He served as a member of the II Riigikogu for a period of less than three weeks in 1924, beginning on 22 March, when he replaced Rudolf Pälson, and ending with his resignation on 9 April. Zilmer was succeeded by Eduard Tiiman.
