= Friends, Comrades =

1990 film directed by Rauni Mollberg

- Original Finnish film poster
- Directed by: Rauni Mollberg
- Written by: Rauni Mollberg; Joni Skiftesvik
- Produced by: Katinka Faragó; Rauni Mollberg
- Starring: Mikk Mikiver
- Cinematography: Kjell Lagerroos
- Edited by: Kaie-Ene Rääk
- Release date: 16 November 1990
- Running time: 132 minutes
- Country: Finland
- Languages: Finnish; English; Swedish; German; Russian
- Budget: FIM 18.5 million

Friends, Comrades (Finnish: Ystävät, toverit) is a 1990 Finnish drama film directed by Rauni Mollberg. It is a brutal story of greed and power, taking place in Petsamo during World War II, and the main character is a nickel factory worker named Arno Jurmala, who always humiliates the side that is winning the war, first the Nazis, then the Red Army.

The film was shot in nine episodes between June 1989 and May 1990, in a total of about 90 shooting days. The majority of the filming took place in the autumn, and a significant part of it was spent in Norway, when a suitable mining village was found in Kirkenes and a log cabin in Hauksjøen for the exterior shots of the Jurmala house. In Finland, the main filming took place in Vesilahti at Mollberg's home studio, where the interior shots of the Jurmala Manor were staged. In the Soviet Union, a monastery and polluted nature were filmed. The film is spoken in five different languages: Finnish, English, Swedish, German and Russian.

Upon its completion, Friends, Comrades was the most expensive Finnish film at time, with a budget of 18.5 million marks. However, it was met with mixed reviews and it had fewer viewers than Mollberg's previous films. The number of viewers in theaters was 38,567. The film was screened in the Un Certain Regard section at the 1991 Cannes Film Festival.

== Cast ==
- Mikk Mikiver as Arno Jurmala
- Stina Ekblad as Lisa Jurmala
- Hannu Lauri as Jaunkahns
- Paavo Liski as Kaakamo
- Otto Ševčík as Manfred Horst
- Ain Lutsepp as Pavlovski
- Aulis Rosendahl as Superintendent Blom
- Tapio Aarre-Ahtio as Lisma
- Göran Schauman as Director Liljeroos
- José Martin as Colonel Camino
- Tuire Salenius as Ulla Kaakamo
- Ilkka Rosma as Younger Jopi Kaakamo
- Kare Eskola as Older Jopi Kaakamo
- Mikko Nousiainen as Merchant Pukki
- Walter Bacon as Kane
- Carmen Mikiver as Olga
