= Villar Perosa submachine gun =

Villar Perosa
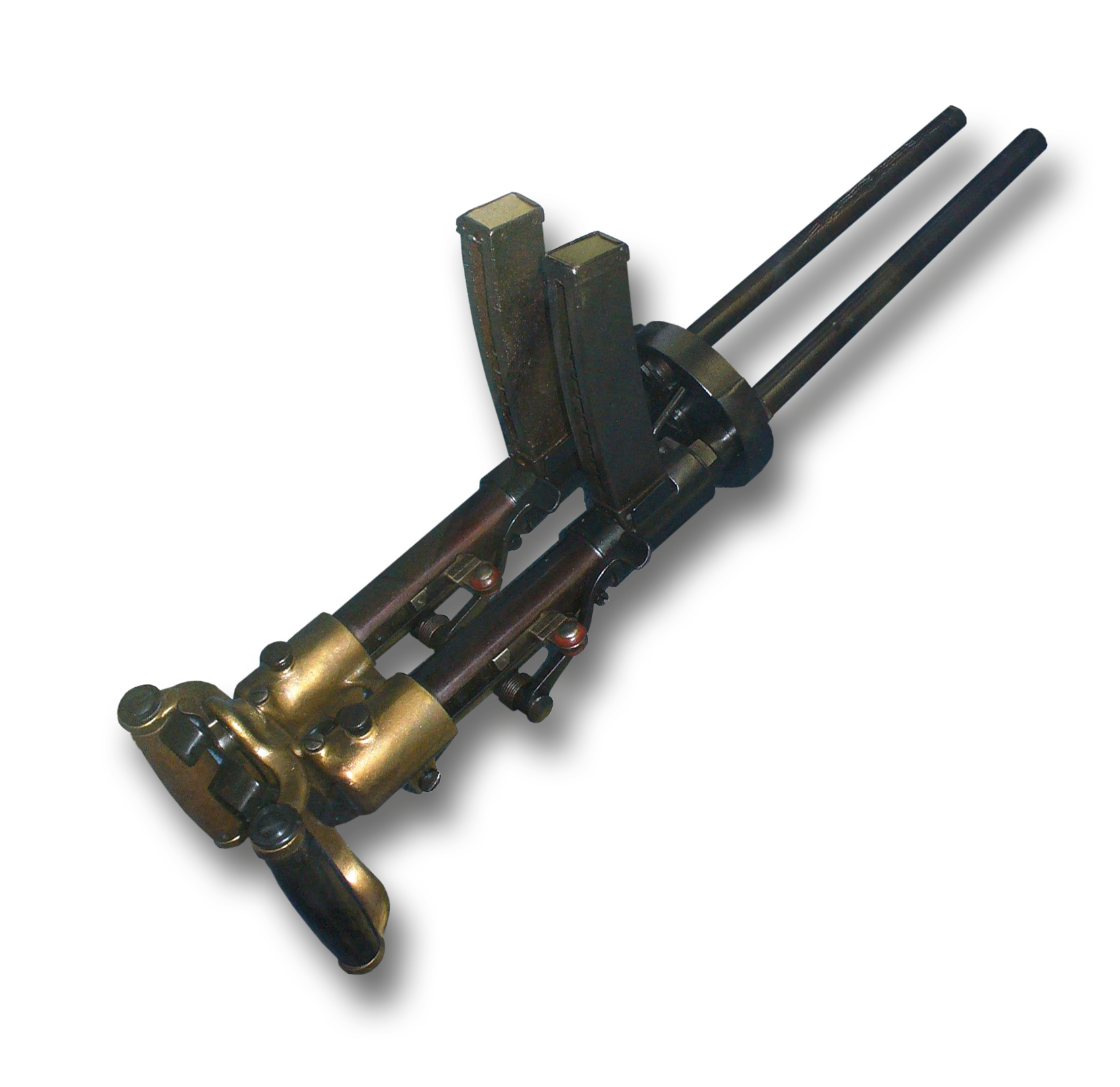
- Type: Light machine gun Aircraft machine gun
- Place of origin: Italy

Service history
- In service: 1915–1920s
- Used by: See users
- Wars: World War I

Production history
- Designer: Bethel Abiel Revelli
- Designed: 1914
- Manufacturer: Officine di Villar Perosa (OVP), FIAT
- Produced: 1915–1918
- No. built: ~15,000
- Variants: Beretta 1918, OVP 1918

Specifications
- Mass: 6.5 kg (14 lb)
- Length: 533 mm (21.0 in)
- Barrel length: 320 mm (13 in)
- Cartridge: Glisenti M.915 Per Mitragliatrici, 9x23mm Steyr (Sturm-Pistole), .455 Webley (Trials only)
- Barrels: 2, side by side
- Action: Delayed blowback
- Rate of fire: 1200-1500 rounds/min per barrel, 2400-3000 total
- Feed system: Two 25-round box magazines or two conjoined 50-round box magazines for Aviation use

The Pistola Mitragliatrice Fiat Mod. 1915, commonly nicknamed the Villar Perosa, was an Italian portable automatic weapon developed during World War I by the Officine di Villar Perosa.

As it was designed to use 9×19mm ammunition, it is said to be the first submachine gun, although not a true submachine gun by modern standards. Due to its extremely high rate of fire, it was nicknamed Pernacchia (literally raspberry) by its operators.

== Design ==
The Villar Perosa was designed as a portable double-barrel machine gun firing a handgun round. It consisted of two independent coupled weapons, each with its own barrel, firing mechanism, and separate 25-round magazine.

Sighting was adjustable for elevation on the infantry model, with five positions available ranging from 100 to 500 meters in 100 meter intervals through a hole in the receiver, and it suffered from handling issues in the early periods of the war as the large shield mount was cumbersome and had a large profile, and later in the war it was replaced with a bipod, which although it didn't provide as much stability as the shield, it was much more mobile and liked by the crews. As the gun lacked any stock it could not be shouldered and fired, use of the gun on the assault typically involved the use of the Bassi mount, or some other mount to hold the gun.

The Villar Perosa operated on a delayed-blowback action. On the forward part of each bolts is an extension housing a guided slot. These slots are engaged by a lug which cause the bolts to rotate 45° upon firing. The bolt's retraction is delayed by the inertia forced by the lug as the bolt rotates. Both bolts ride on a spring-loaded guide rod.

All weapons of the Villar Perosa family, including the O.V.P. submachine gun and Revelli-Beretta carbine, were originally intended to fire a variant of the 9mm Glisenti cartridge, known as Glisenti M.915 "Per Mitragliatrici" ("For Machine-Guns"). This was a higher-velocity version of the standard Glisenti cartridge with an over-powder wad, designed to improve the penetration abilities of the weak base cartridge.

The original patent was filed in April 1914 by Abiel Bethel Revelli, a Piedmontese officer who was active in designing most of the Italian Army's automatic weapons in the early 20th century.

A common myth is that this weapon was originally designed as an aircraft gun, and adapted for infantry. In reality ground use was taken into consideration from the very beginning, particularly for the Bersaglieri's cyclist battalions. At the time the Italian Army was experimenting with adapting machineguns to be carried or fired from a bicycle, including a special folding bicycle that carried a Fiat-Revelli machine-gun underneath the seat. This misconception was generated because the Italian Air Corp (at that time a wing of the Army) was the first Corp to adopt the gun into service, with the first batch of Villar Perosa produced issued to them in April 1915 - giving rise to the myth that it was designed as an aircraft gun, even though the original design included the steel shield that the gun would slot into for use in the defensive role.

Before World War I, one of the many Italian Royal Army suppliers was a small factory near Pinerolo, known as Officine di Villar Perosa (O.V.P.). This company was a subsidiary of FIAT operated by Roberto Incerti. O.V.P. was primarily contracted to manufacture bicycles, but later the Italian Army commissioned them to produce automatic weapons designed by Abiel Revelli. They placed an order for 6,000 Genovesi-Revelli automatic rifles in 1910, but only 150 were built since the weapon underperformed and was cancelled. The Villar Perosa submachine gun was developed by Revelli in the following years, and it would seem to have offered a solution to the Cyclist Bersaglieri's armament request, since photographs show a Villar Perosa experimentally mounted to the handlebars of a bicycle.

== Operational history ==
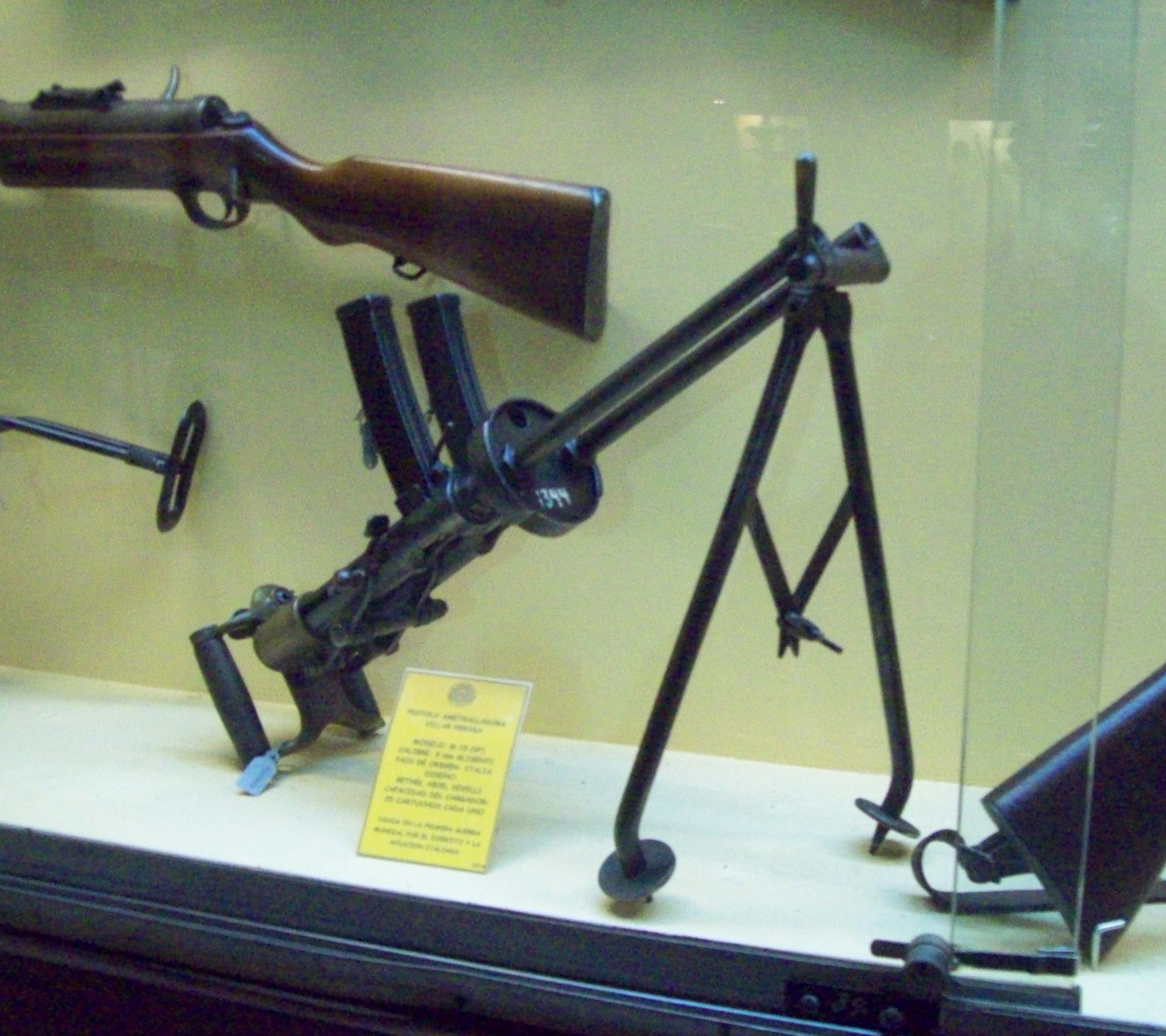
A Villar Perosa at the Museo de Armas de la Nación, Buenos Aires.

In early 1915, O.V.P. produced a trial batch of Villar Perosas and submitted them to the Army for testing. The weapon was accepted into service in August 1915 and an immediate order was placed. When Italy entered World War I that year, the Army suffered a shortage of machine guns, since it had only half the machine-gun sections needed for the mobilization. These sections were mostly armed with modern Vickers guns, while fortifications and garrisons were armed with some obsolete 1886 Gardner guns, Perino machine guns, and a few Maxim guns.

The Fiat-Revelli and the Villar Perosa were the only domestically-produced machine guns, and the demand ramped up significantly. Production in the first year fell short, with only about 200 - 400 Fiat-Revellis being turned out, and about 350 Villar Perosas. The Italian Air Corp had virtually no machine-guns, and the first 350 Villar Perosas ordered were issued to them, with the first 50 delivered in April 1915 - giving rise to the myth that it was designed as an aircraft gun.By the end of the war the total amount of Villar Perosa in aircraft configuration used by the Italian Air Corp varied between the 800 and 2,000 guns.

The weapon was originally issued with a gun shield, assembled separately by the Turin State Arsenal (Arsenale Costruzione d'Artiglieria di Torino) with steel supplied by Genova Ansaldo and Terni steel mills. The main bottlenecks in early production were in fact the shields, that needed special treatments to stop shrapnel and rifle bullets, slowing down the whole process.

The Villar Perosa was first issued to the infantry in April 1916, with mixed results.

The Austro-Hungarians first encountered the weapon at the Battle of Asiago in May 1916. Although only a few hundred Villar Perosas were in frontline service initially, the number swelled up to about over 2,000 by the end of 1916 and it became increasingly common for Austro-Hungarian troops to come under attack from Italian troops wielding this new weapon.

The weapon was light and easy to transport in the terrain of the Alpine Front, but troops were initially not given training with it and officers had no idea how best to field it. The weapon was used almost exclusively as a defensive machine-gun on trench lines and observation points for most of 1916. In this role it would have almost certainly been inadequate, as it lacked the range, accuracy, capacity and firepower of a proper machine gun.

As the war progressed, training for the gun was introduced and infantrymen trained on the Villar Perosa were issued a shoulder patch to signify that they had experience with the weapon, in accordance with a practice in the Italian Army to issue patches that illustrated the machine-gun that a gunner was trained with.

By 1917 the newly formed Arditi shock troops pioneered assault tactics with the weapon. It was well liked due to its high rate of fire and its weight (it was very light for a support weapon), and went under various modifications: Lt. Col. Giuseppe Bassi personally designed a carrying system (consisting of a leather belt fixed to the handles that was later arranged behind the gunner's neck) to enhance Arditi performances in battle. In his idea, a section of 8 (later 16) VP machine guns had to support the attack of 20 to 30 Arditi armed with rifles, daggers and hand-grenades, giving adequate suppressive fire and striking the enemy on a psychological level as well. Each weapon was manned by four people: a shooter with a backpack or a shoulder ammo bag and 3 ammo carriers, who could take with them up to 5,000 rounds.

Also in 1917, a bipod was introduced to replace the obsolete shield mount, for which the gun was originally designed.

A tripod mount was also developed, which could be fitted to the flexible pintle seen on the aerial service Villar Perosas. The Italian government contracted the Canadian General Electric company of Toronto to produce the tripod-mounted Villar Perosas; why Canada was approached is not entirely known. This version of the Villar Perosa lacked the central sighting ring, and used an elevated fore-sight fixed onto the barrels, with a circular rear-sight above the spade grips. These Villar Perosas were probably used for defensive fixtures and mounted on vehicles.

Some VP machine pistols were equipped with a wooden stock, though the firing mechanism remained unaltered and was not modified in the fashion of, for example, the Carabinetta Automatica O.V.P or the Moschetto Automatico Revelli-Beretta Mod. 1915.

By 1917 the Austrian Sturmbataillons were being trained with captured Villar Perosas.

== Legacy ==
=== Italian derivatives ===
The mechanism of the VP was a sound design, and shortly after the end of the war was used as the basis of more practical weapons, such as the Carabinetta Automatica O.V.P and the Moschetto Automatico Revelli-Beretta Mod. 1915.

=== British Trials ===
On the 7th of October 1915 Mr. Bernachi a representative from Officine di Villar Perosa, demonstrated a 9mm Villar Perosa at the School of Musketry in Hythe. A report describing the gun as "two long-barreled automatic pistols connected together", was forwarded to the Small Arms Committee, who expressed an interest in this gun. On the 18th of October, the SAC tested the same Villar Perosa at Enfield. It performed rather well and was considered to be an ideal gun for trench warfare. The SAC report referred to the gun as the "Villar Perosa Machine Gun", the first known use of the now-ubiquitous name for the gun (In Italy, the Villar Perosa was known only as the "Revelli" or the "Fiat").

When approached by the SAC over the requirement of a submachine gun by the British Army, the General Headquarters in France responded in late January 1916 with a clear refusal. This would mark the beginning of the British Army's reluctance to engage with the submachine gun concept until 1940.

Later in 1916, after O.V.P. developed the pintle mount for the Villar Perosa, they sent a prototype to Britain chambered in the .455 Webley Auto cartridge. Only one such example was ever made and is today in the National Firearms Center in Leeds. This gun fed from straight magazines which were windowed across the sides rather than the back. It was probably intended for aerial use, but there appears to have been no interest from the Royal Flying Corps.

=== Sturmpistole ===
Feeling that the Anschlagpistole M.12 was not a suitable counter, the Austro-Hungarians began designing SMGs that would give equivalent performance to the Villar Perosa.

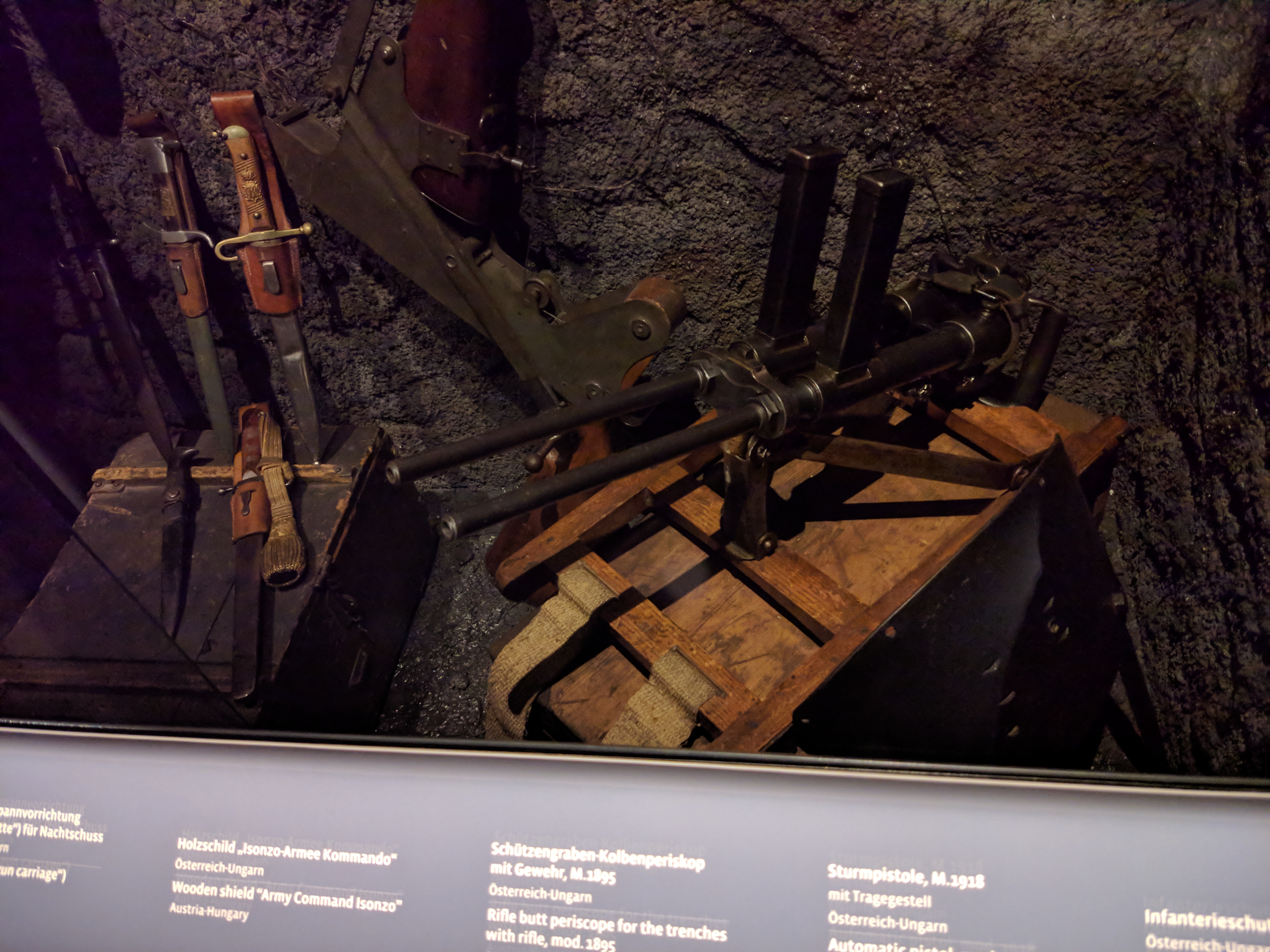
A Sturmpistol M.18 in the Heeresgeschichtliches Museum in Vienna.

By February 1917, several prototype designs that met this requirement had been developed. These included submissions by ŒWG of Steyr, FÉG of Budapest, and Škoda of Plzeň. The designs by ŒWG and FÉG centered around the idea of tethering two machine pistols together onto a central mount to mimic the Villar Perosa, but they bore no similarity to the Italian weapon on a technical basis. The FEG factory developed unusual contraption consisting of two Frommer machine-pistols mounted upside-down onto a tripod, with remote trigger mechanisms mounted to a pair of spade grips.

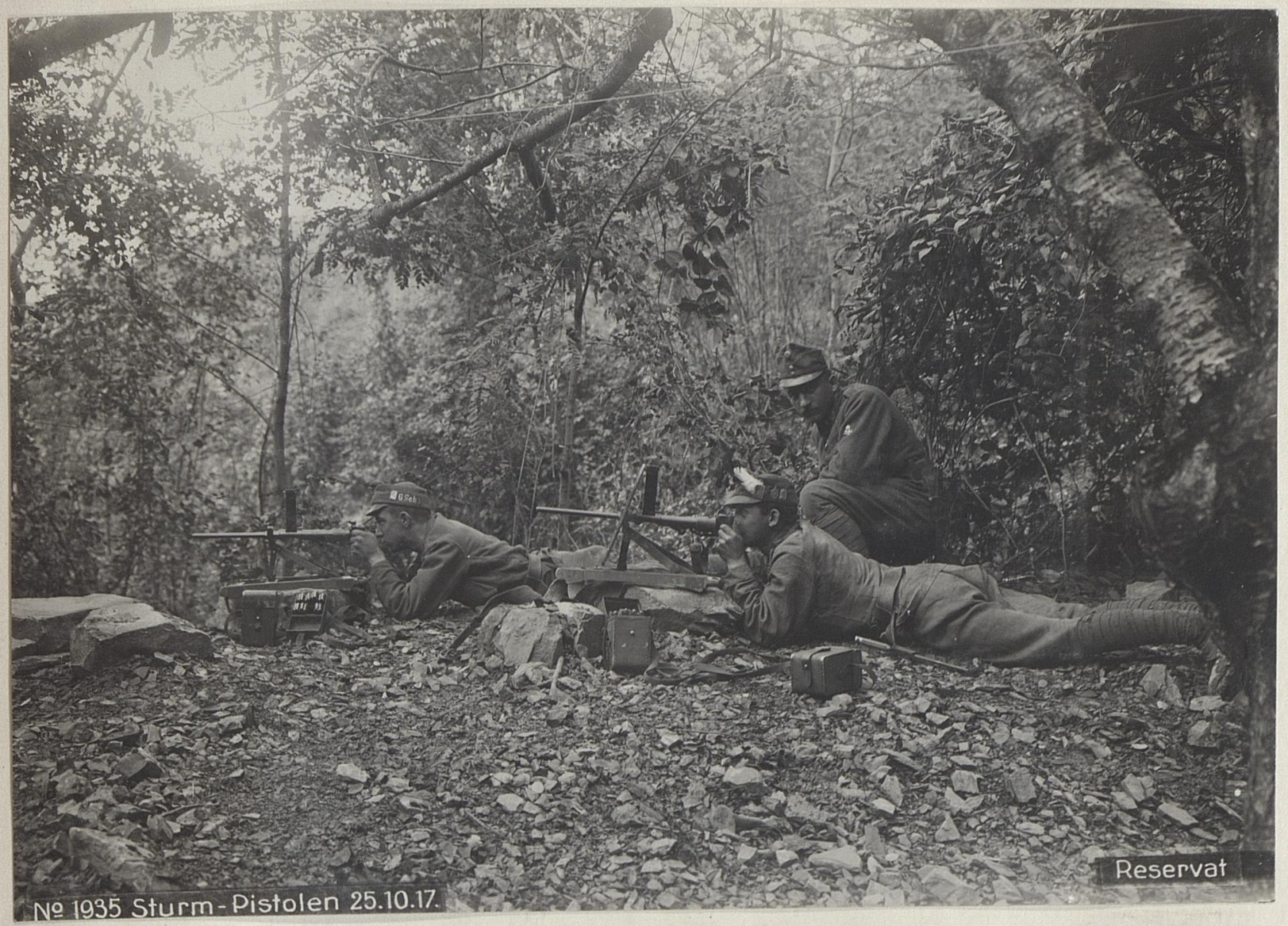
Austro-Hungarian troops using the Sturmpistole during the Battle of Caporetto

Škoda decided that it would be simpler to directly reverse-engineer the Villar Perosa and manufacture a straight copy, which would be almost interchangeable with the original. In March that year, Škoda delivered their first batch of experimental guns - which they called the 'Sturmpistole' ('Assault Pistol') - to the K.u.K. Artillerie-Arsenal in Vienna, and trials were carried out over the coming months. A conclusion was reached in about August or September 1917, in favour of the Škoda gun, an order for 50 Sturmpistolen was placed by K.u.K. Kriegsministerium in anticipation of field trials at the planned Caporetto offensive.

The Sturmpistole was chambered in 9x23mm and fed from 25 round straight magazines. Although this weapon was essentially a copy of the original Italian gun, the construction was different and the parts were not necessarily interchangeable. The Sturm-Pistole was fitted to a wooden tray mount similar to the one used by the Arditi.

The first Sturmpistolen were delivered in October and issued in batches of ten to Gebirgsschützenbataillonen (Mountain Battalions) in the Mrzli-Vodil sector outside Caporetto. Almost immediately, issues with the weapons were reported; the magazines were unreliable. One battalion, under a Captain Prasch, reported that only one of the ten guns they received was fully operational, indicating that they may have been rushed into service without proper testing. Additionally, the new weapon and its faults were disclosed by two Czech deserters from Captain Prasch's battalion on the 19th or 20 October. There exists a photograph from the second day of the offensive depicting two of these guns being fielded by Austrian machine-gun crews, with the caption "Sturm-Pistolen".

Some Sturmpistolen and Villar Perosas were retained by the independent Czechoslovak Army, but were generally only kept in storage and not issued.

=== German research ===
The Germans were familiar with the Villar Perosa prior to the development of the MP 18,I. The Austro-Hungarians had captured quantities of the weapon over the course of 1916, and by March 1917, the Austrian Sturmbataillons - trained by German instructors - were training with Villar Perosas. It is likely that the Austrians would have introduced the Germans to this weapon. Additionally, the capture of some 2,200 Villar Perosas at the Battle of Caporetto, furnished both the Austro-Hungarian and German forces with a large pool of submachine guns to study and, in fact, issue to their own troops.

German assessments of the Villar Perosa appeared in Die Technik im Weltkriege (1920) and Die militärischen Lehren des grossen Krieges (1923). No solid connection can be made between the Villar Perosa and the MP 18,I, but the Germans were certainly aware of this Italian submachine gun, and were presumably aware of the efforts that Austria-Hungary made to replicate it since 1917. It is possible that German studies into the submachine gun concept during the First World War were partially inspired by the use of submachine guns by the Italian and Austro-Hungarian armies prior to 1918.

=== Kulometná Pistole Netsch ===
The 'Kulometná Pistole Netsch', designed by a former engineer of the Škoda plant, Josef Netsch, was a single-barreled automatic with a buttstock which employed the same bolt design and locking mechanism as the Villar Perosa. Netsch was doubtlessly influenced by Škoda's work on the Sturmpistole. Several variations of his carbine were tested by the Czechoslovak Army in 1919, but it was not adopted.

== Users ==
- Italy
- Austria-Hungary: Captured examples, Sturmpistole
- Czechoslovakia
- Germany: Captured examples
- United Kingdom: Trial purposes, chambered in .455 Webley Auto

== See also ==
- Beretta M1918
- Gast gun

== Bibliography ==
- George M. Chinn, The Machine Gun. History, Evolution, and Development of Manual, Automatic, and Airborne Repeating Weapons, Volume I.
- Philip Schreier, The World's First Sub-Gun. Guns & Ammo Surplus Firearms, September 2009.
- Nicola Pignato, Le armi di una vittoria, Vol. 2, Gaspari Editore, 2010.
- Franco Cabrio, Uomini e mitragliatrici nella Grande Guerra, Parte seconda, Gino Rossato Editore, 2009.
- Filippo Cappellano; Basilio Di Martino; Bruno Marcuzzo, Gli artigli delle aquile, l'armamento aereo in Italia durante la Grande Guerra, Ufficio Storico Aeronautica Militare, 2011.
