= 1924 Estonian coup attempt =

Coup attempt by communists infiltrated from the USSR

Coordinates: 58.595272°N 25.013607°E

Date	1 December 1924
Location	Estonia
Result	Estonian government victory

Belligerents
Communists; Supported by: Soviet Union	Estonia

Commanders and leaders
Jaan Anvelt; August Lillakas	Johan Laidoner; Johan Unt

Strength
279 armed militants and red soldiers, 56 sympathisers with 5 Thompson light machine guns, 55 rifles, 65 hand grenades, 8 explosive devices and 150 pistols	500–700 soldiers and cadets

Casualties and losses
125 killed 500 arrested	26 soldiers and cadets

The 1924 Estonian coup d'état attempt was a failed coup attempt in Estonia on 1 December 1924, conducted by the Comintern, and staged by the Communist Party of Estonia and Bolsheviks who in most part had been infiltrated from the Soviet Union. Of the 279 actively participating pro-communist rebels, 125 were killed in action, later more than 500 people were arrested. Estonian government forces lost 26 men.

== Background ==
The Communist Party of Estonia had affiliated with the Comintern in 1920, and it continued underground activities in Estonia with strong Soviet Russian backing.

The incapacity and death of Vladimir Lenin (21 January 1924) triggered a struggle for power between Leon Trotsky and Joseph Stalin. The Soviet Union's foreign policy drifted during this period in relation to Estonia. On 1 December 1924 the Comintern attempted the communist coup in Estonia.

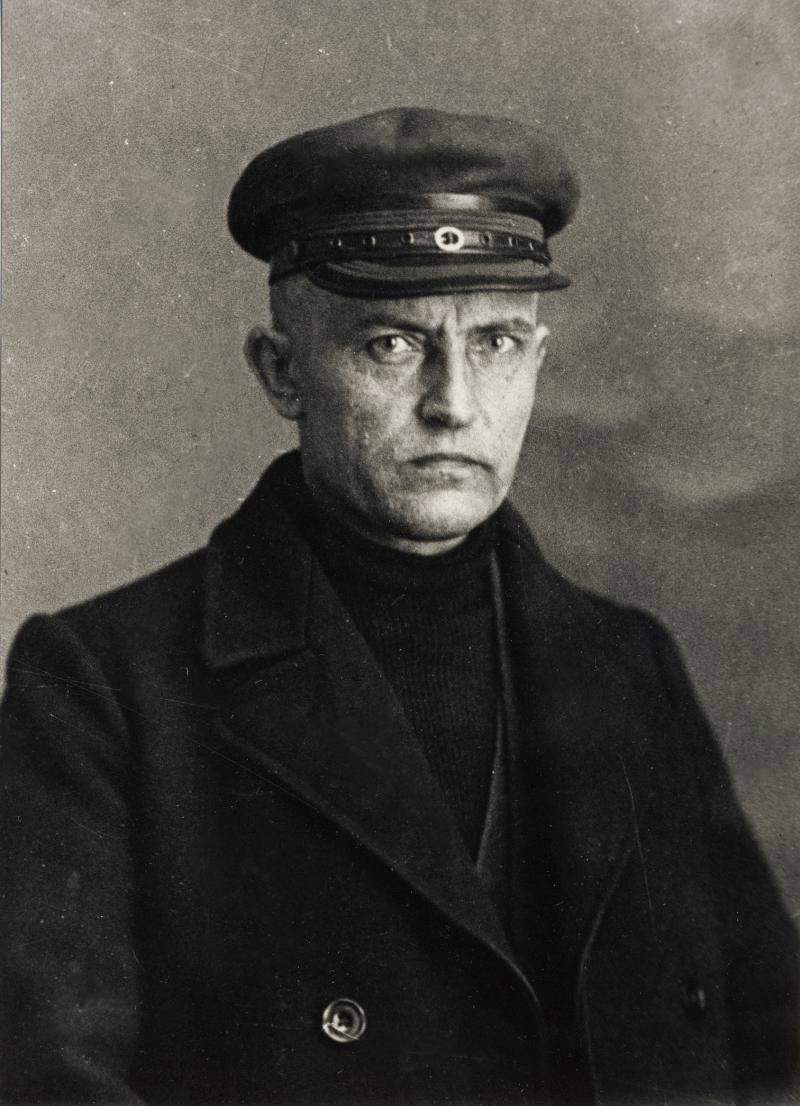
Jaan Anvelt

== Planning ==
Sixty Razvedupr officers were dispatched to Tallinn in the spring of 1924 to organise an uprising.

The plan was hatched by Jaan Anvelt and Karl Rimm. The latter was a veteran of the Russian Civil War. The plan envisaged a main attack aimed at Tallinn, with subsequent coups in Tartu, Narva, Pärnu, Viljandi, Rakvere, Kunda, and Kohila.

The revolt was supposed to start at 5:15 a.m. The 279 communists, mostly infiltrated from the Soviet Union, were armed with 5 Thompson submachine guns, 55 rifles, 65 hand grenades, 8 explosive devices and 150 pistols. It was incorrectly expected that the workers and soldiers would join the insurgency and would help seize power in the capital. The plan called for the establishment of a Soviet republic with a "working people's government" in Estonia.

Most of the schemes were spoiled by the Trial of the 149 in November 1924, which eliminated many potential communist organisers. The gunmen's first priority was to take over the Estonian National Defence College based in the Tondi suburb south of the city centre, the main narrow gauge railway station in Tallinn-Väike, and a battalion of engineering troops in Nõmme.

== Action ==
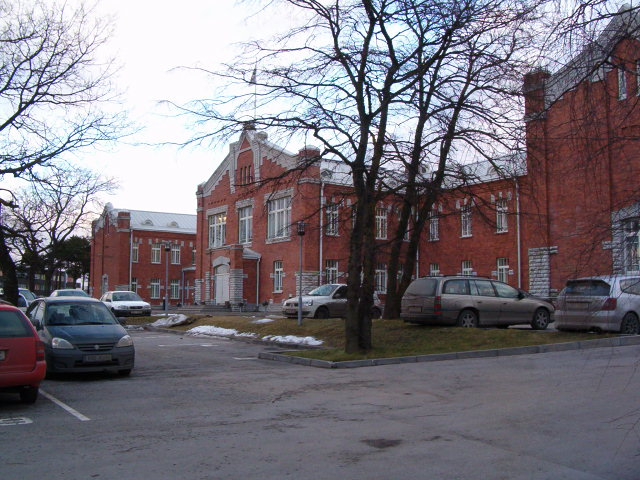
Tondi barracks HQ

In late November 1924, shortly after the conclusion of the Trial of the 149, the decision was taken in Moscow to initiate the uprising on 1 December. On the night of 30 November, those assigned to attack the Tondi Military Officer Candidate School were instructed to assemble at the Reimann residence, located roughly a kilometre away. Although around 140 participants had been expected, only 56 ultimately appeared. The group’s armament was limited, consisting of a single light machine gun, four rifles, several pistols, and a number of hand grenades. Three couriers were designated to maintain communication with other detachments and with the central command.

The communist gunmen started to move on 1 December 1924, at 5:00 a.m. At the time there were 450 cadets, non-commissioned officers and officers in the military college. The officer on duty was Lieutenant Joosep Lääne, assisted by a cadet. The three-member guard had just returned to the building after their patrol.

When the gunmen reached their target, they attacked the dormitory of cadets, throwing hand grenades into windows and shooting sleeping cadets on the ground floor. Three guardsmen assisted by four artillery cadets who had managed to get 9 mm semi-automatic pistols from the armory blocked the way to the first floor and opened fire on the attackers. This gave the cadets on the first floor time to get their guns from the armory and launch a counterattack, forcing the attackers to retreat. At the same time a smaller group of insurgents had attacked the cadets' mess, which was empty as the officer on duty and his assistant had left the building.

A patrol of cadets stopped a car coming from the city. Seeing armed cadets, the driver tried to escape, but he and his companions were caught and brought to the military academy. Two of them turned out to be brothers of an insurgent, Rudolf Vakmann, who had been sent to bring weapons from the academy. A court-martial composed of three officers was formed. After a short investigation, all seven passengers were summarily executed that night.

Nine cadets were wounded during the uprising. Cadets Arnold Allebras, Aleksander Teder, Aleksander Tomson and August Udras were killed.

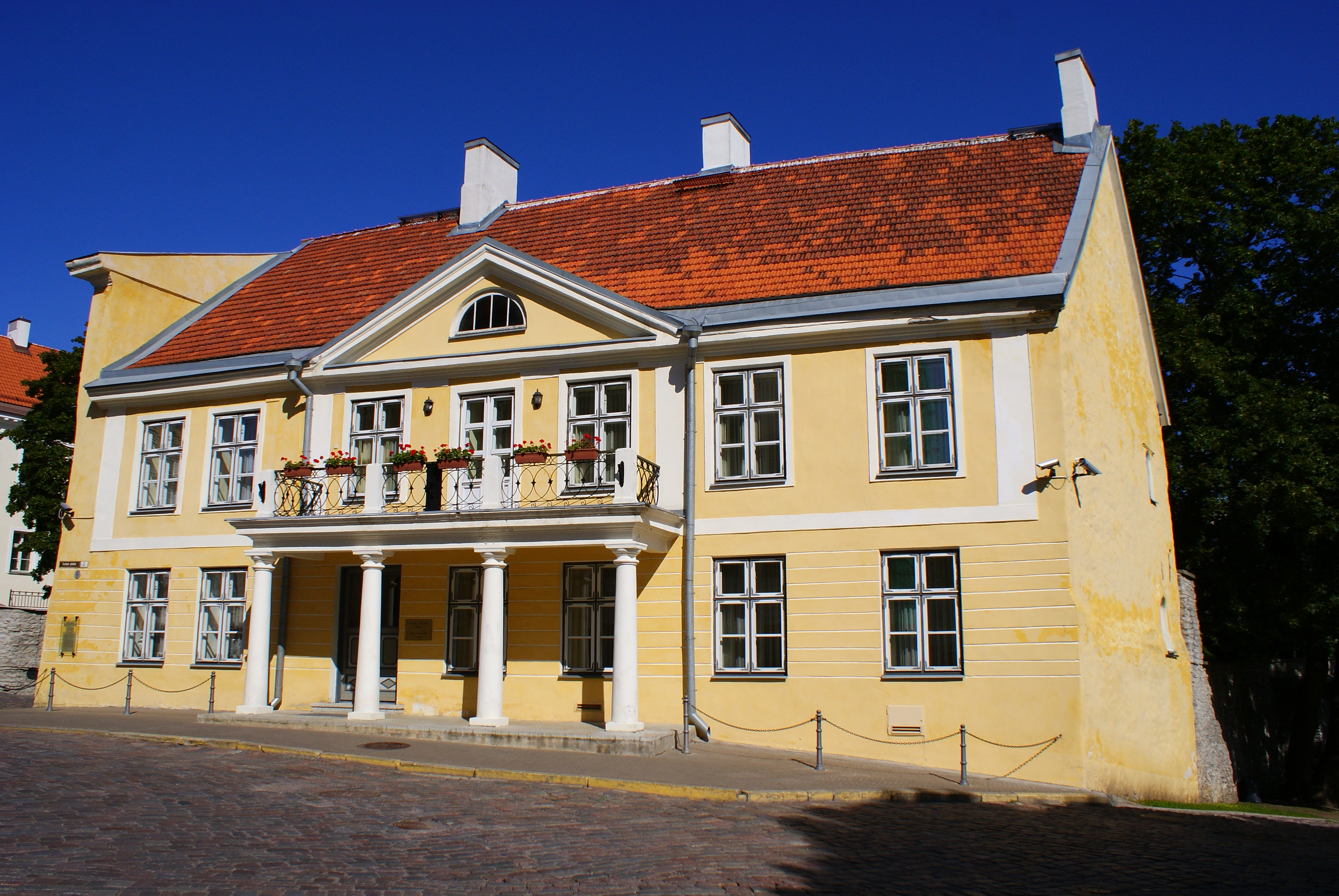
The residence of the State Elder from 1919 to 1929, now the residence of the Ambassador of Germany to Estonia

Another strike team of communists attacked the Toompea Castle, where the offices of the State Elder, Riigikogu and the Government were located. A third group entered the apartment of the State Elder behind the Alexander Nevsky Cathedral. The State Elder, Friedrich Akel, managed to escape through the back door.

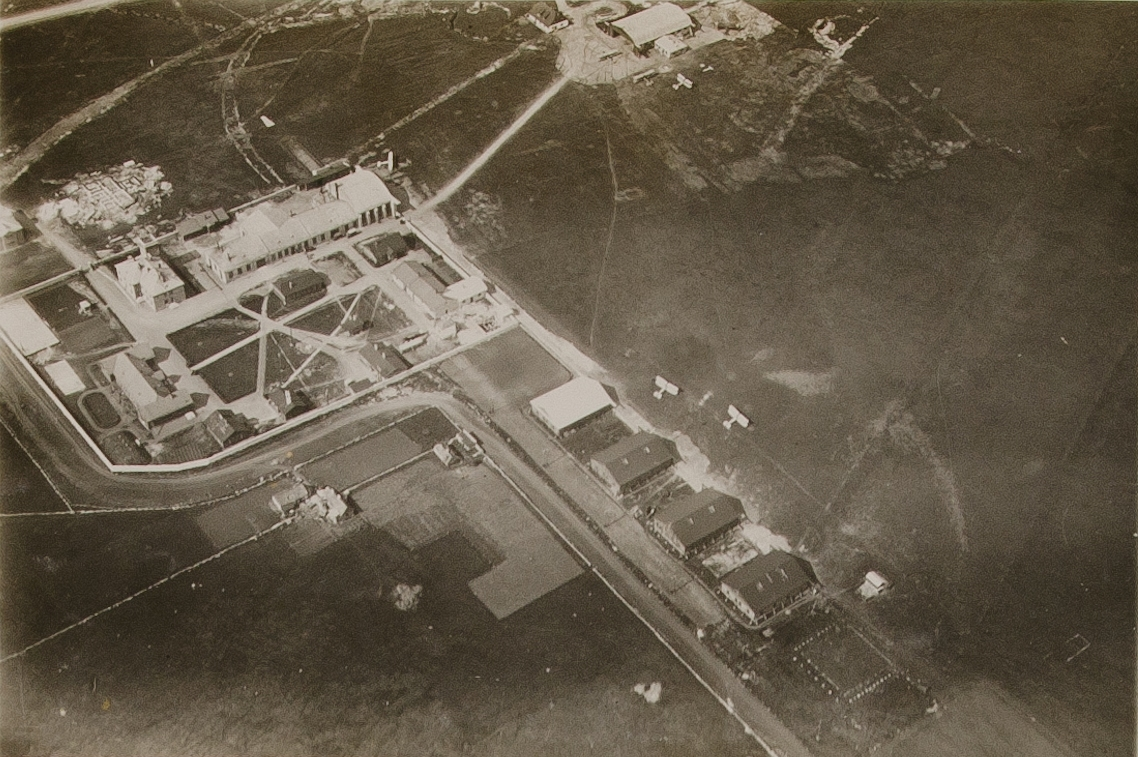
Lasnamäe Airfield in the late 1920s

The communists were successful in capturing the military airfield and barracks of the air division in Lasnamäe, where some soldiers joined them. However, the additional units that soon arrived forced the attackers to retreat. Two air force lieutenants were court-martialled for their collaboration with the attackers and sentenced to death. Seeing their failure, the attackers hijacked two military aircraft and tried to escape to the Soviet Union. One of the planes was forced to land close to Narva, but the other plane managed to cross the border unharmed.

In the motorised division the communists got some help from a non-commissioned officer, took over the tank garage and damaged some of the tanks, rendering them immovable. After the non-commissioned officer Loorents was shot by Rudolf Kaptein, another non-commissioned officer, the insurgents ran away.

Another group took over the main railway station, arrested the officer of the day and killed several police officers. As all passenger trains were halted by the insurgents, the Minister of Roads, Karl Kark, decided to check personally on the situation. He was shot and mortally wounded on the stairs of the railway station.

An exchange of fire also took place at the corner of Vene and Apteegi Streets where the Main Post Office was located. The Chief of the Tartu garrison, General Ernst Põdder was in Tallinn on an errand, and was having a drink in a mess with his friends close to the exchange of fire early in the morning. They noticed the skirmish in the street and rushed into the battle.

By 10:00 a.m. the government forces had the situation under control and had retaken all buildings captured by the rebels.

== Aftermath ==
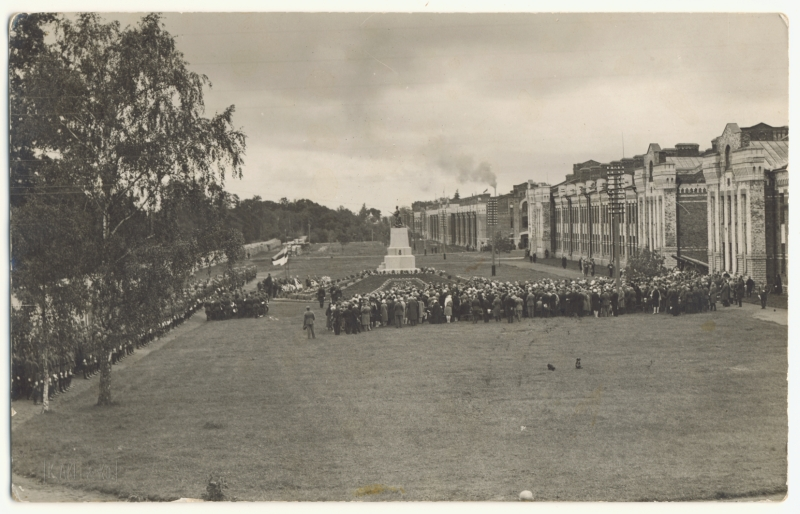
Unveiling of the monument to the fallen cadets in 1928

Although the attempted coup was over in five hours, the manhunt for participants continued for several days.

On 5 December 1924, a battle took place near Tallinn in Iru. Police officers shot three prominent communists: Arnold Sommerling, Evald Ambos and Osvald Piiri. On 7 December there was a police operation in Vilmsi Street in Tallinn. The police raided a house at 50 Vilmsi Street and shot three Communists: G. Kreuks, V. Bogdanov and Rudolf Pälson.

Some of the main organisers, including Jaan Anvelt and Rudolf Vakmann, managed to escape to the Soviet Union. Later, they were arrested and executed by Soviet authorities during the Great Purge.

The Estonian government awarded the Cross of Liberty to ten people for their contribution: Johan Laidoner, Johan Unt, Hermann Rossländer, Rudolf Aaman, Richard Brücker, Rudolf Kaptein, August Keng, Alfred Klemmer, Albert Pesur and August Schaurup. That was the last occasion that the award was granted.

A monument to the cadets who died during the coup attempt (also known as the Tondi Boys Statue) was unveiled in 1928 in Tondi (at Tondi tänav 55/57), which was designed by Amandus Adamson. Destroyed by the Soviets in 1941, it was rebuilt at the original location and unveiled on Tallinn Day on 15 May 2009 by sculptor Jaak Soans.

Estonia was eventually invaded and occupied by the Soviet Union during and after the World War II until the restoration of the country's independence in 1991. During the 1944-1991 Soviet occupation of Estonia, the 1924 communist coup attempt was referred to by the authorities as the Tallinn Uprising of 1 December 1924, and described as part of a Marxist world revolution.

In 1974, a monument to the rebels was opened across the road from the Balti jaam, the main railway station. It was demolished in the beginning of the 1990s. People used to joke that it was the only monument in the world that managed to portray all the participants of a coup attempt (there were four figures presented).

== Film ==
- December Heat (2008) directed by Asko Kase, is a drama film depicting planning of the coup and events on 1 December.
- Ask The Dead For The Price Of Death (1978) directed by Kaljo Kiisk, a Soviet drama film, set after the failure of the coup a few months later through the viewpoint of an arrested communist idealist named Anton Sommer.

== Literature ==
- J. Saar. Enamlaste riigipöörde katse Tallinnas 1. detsembril 1924. Osavõtjate tunnistuste ja uurimise andmete järel. Tallinn, 1925.
- Chapter: Der Aufstand in Reval (The uprising in Reval), in: A. Neuberg (that is Hans Kippenberger/M. N. Tuchatschewski/Ho Chi Minh): Der bewaffnete Aufstand. Versuch einer theoretischen Darstellung. Eingeleitet von Erich Wollenberg, Frankfurt a. M. 1971 (originally published Moscow 1928 under the legend of Zürich), p. 42-66.

== Sources ==
- Estonian MFA's fact sheet on the coup (in English)
