= December Heat =

2008 film

- Directed by: Asko Kase
- Written by: Mihkel Ulman; Lauri Vahtre
- Produced by: Artur Talvik
- Starring: Sergo Vares; Liisi Koikson; Tõnu Kark; Mait Malmsten; Tambet Tuisk; Carmen Mikiver; Ain Lutsepp
- Cinematography: Kjell Lagerroos
- Edited by: Tambet Tasuja
- Distributed by: Ruut Pictures
- Release date: 16 October 2008
- Running time: 100 minutes
- Country: Estonia
- Languages: Estonian; Russian; English

December Heat (Estonian: Detsembrikuumus) is a 2008 historic action drama film about the 1924 Estonian coup d'état attempt directed by Asko Kase and starring Sergo Vares and Liisi Koikson.

== Plot ==
"December 1924. It's only a matter of minutes whether Estonian young independence continues to exist or we become a province with minor importance of big communist Russia. Independence which seems so self-evident today depends at that moment on couple of random coincidences."

== Cast ==
- Sergo Vares as Tanel Rõuk
- Liisi Koikson as Anna Rõuk
- Ain Lutsepp as Julius Saarepuu
- Piret Kalda as Maret Saarepuu
- Emil-Joosep Virkus as Joosep Saarepuu
- Tambet Tuisk as Specialist
- Mait Malmsten as lawyer Jaan (prototype: Jaan Anvelt)
- Taavi Teplenkov as Veidesoo
- Tiit Sukk as factory owner Indrek
- Rain Simmul as Head of Intelligence

Historic people

- Tõnu Kark as Major General Ernst Põdder
- Priit Pedajas as Major General Johan Unt
- Carmen Mikiver as Elsa Kingissepp
- Ilkka Koivula as Otto Kuusinen
- Yevgeny Knyazev as Grigori Zinovjev

== Production ==
Actual conscripts from Tallinn's Guard Battalion were used to play the part of the mass-up soldiers.
