= Mikk Mikiver =

Estonian actor and theater director

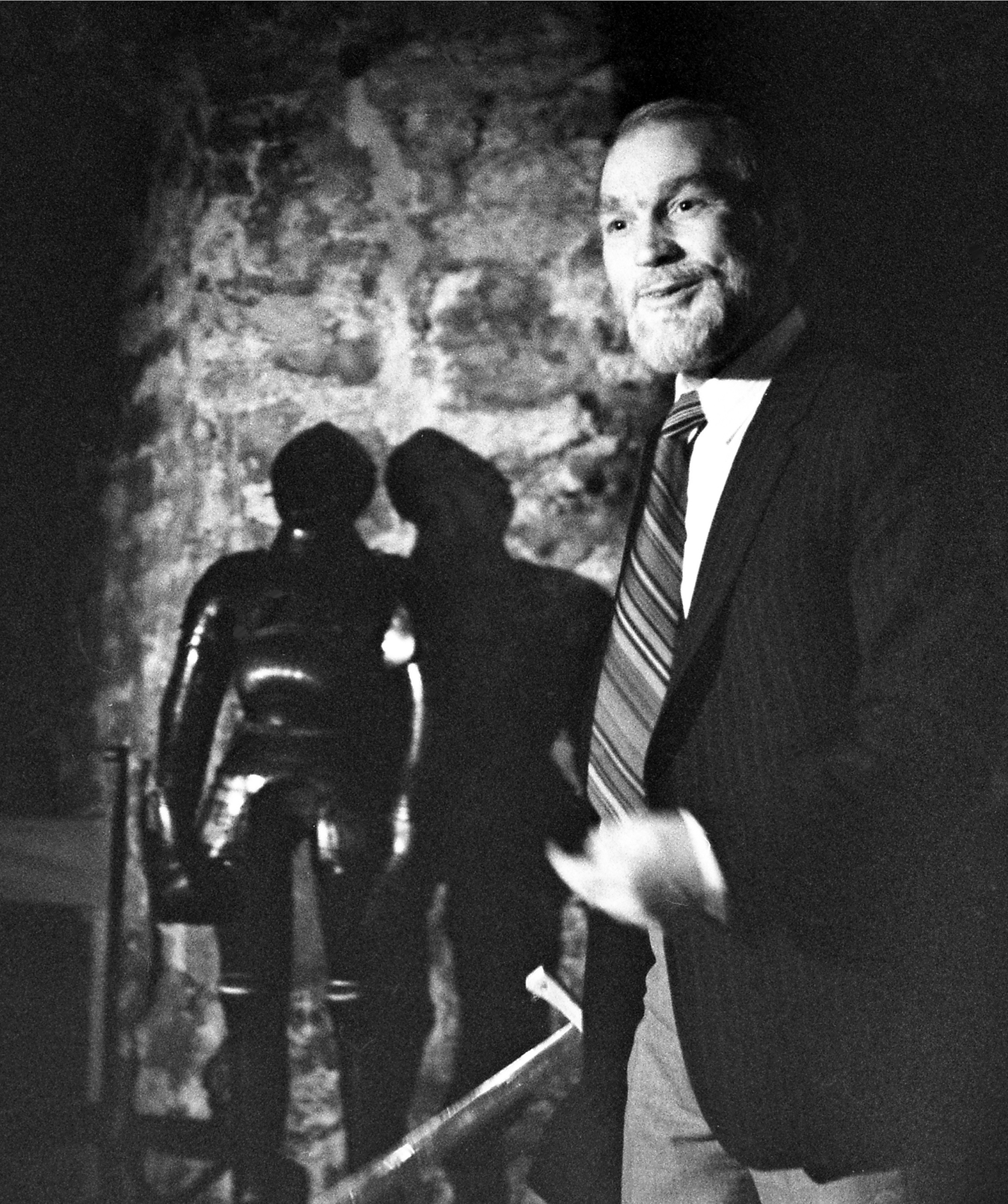
- Mikiver in 1983
- Born: 4 September 1937; Tallinn, Estonia
- Died: 9 January 2006 (aged 68); Võsu, Estonia
- Occupations: actor, theater director

Mikk Mikiver (4 September 1937 – 9 January 2006) was a prominent Estonian stage and film actor and theater director.

== Biography ==
Mikiver was born in Tallinn, Estonia. He graduated from the State Conservatory of Tallinn in 1961. He then went on to appear in many Estonian films and was a highly regarded dramatic actor. In addition to stage and film, Mikiver was also a prodigious television actor. While never retiring from acting, Mikiver gradually became more interested in theater direction and was for many years the principal director of the Estonian Drama Theatre and the Estonian Youth Theater.

In addition to Estonian language films, Mikiver also appeared in Russian, Swedish, Polish and Finnish productions.

For his notable achievements, the Estonian government awarded Mikiver the Order of the White Star, 4th Class, as well as the National Lifetime Achievement award. Mikiver was also a patron of the Tallinn Children's Hospital Foundation. He died at the age of 68 on 9 January 2006.

Mikk Mikiver was the older brother of actor Tõnu Mikiver and was married to actress Carmen Mikiver from 1989 until his death. Between 1971 and 1983 he was married to actress Ada Lundver.

== Selected filmography ==
- Diamonds for the Dictatorship of the Proletariat (1975)
- "Hukkunud Alpinisti" hotell (1979)
- Karge meri (1981)
- The End of Eternity (1987)
- The 13th Apostle (1988)
- Entrance to the Labyrinth (1989)
- Friends, Comrades (1990)
- Rahu tänav (1991)
