= Rudolf Pälson =

Estonian politician (1900–1924)

Rudolf Pälson (24 June 1900, Kudina Parish (now Jõgeva Parish), Kreis Dorpat – 7 December 1924, Tallinn) was an Estonian politician. He was a member of II Riigikogu. On 22 March 1924, he resigned and was replaced by Adolf Zillmer. On 1 December 1924, he participated in the 1924 Estonian coup d'état attempt, and on 7 December, he was shot by Estonian police officers in Tallinn while resisting arrest.
