= Carmen Mikiver =

Estonian actress (born 1964)

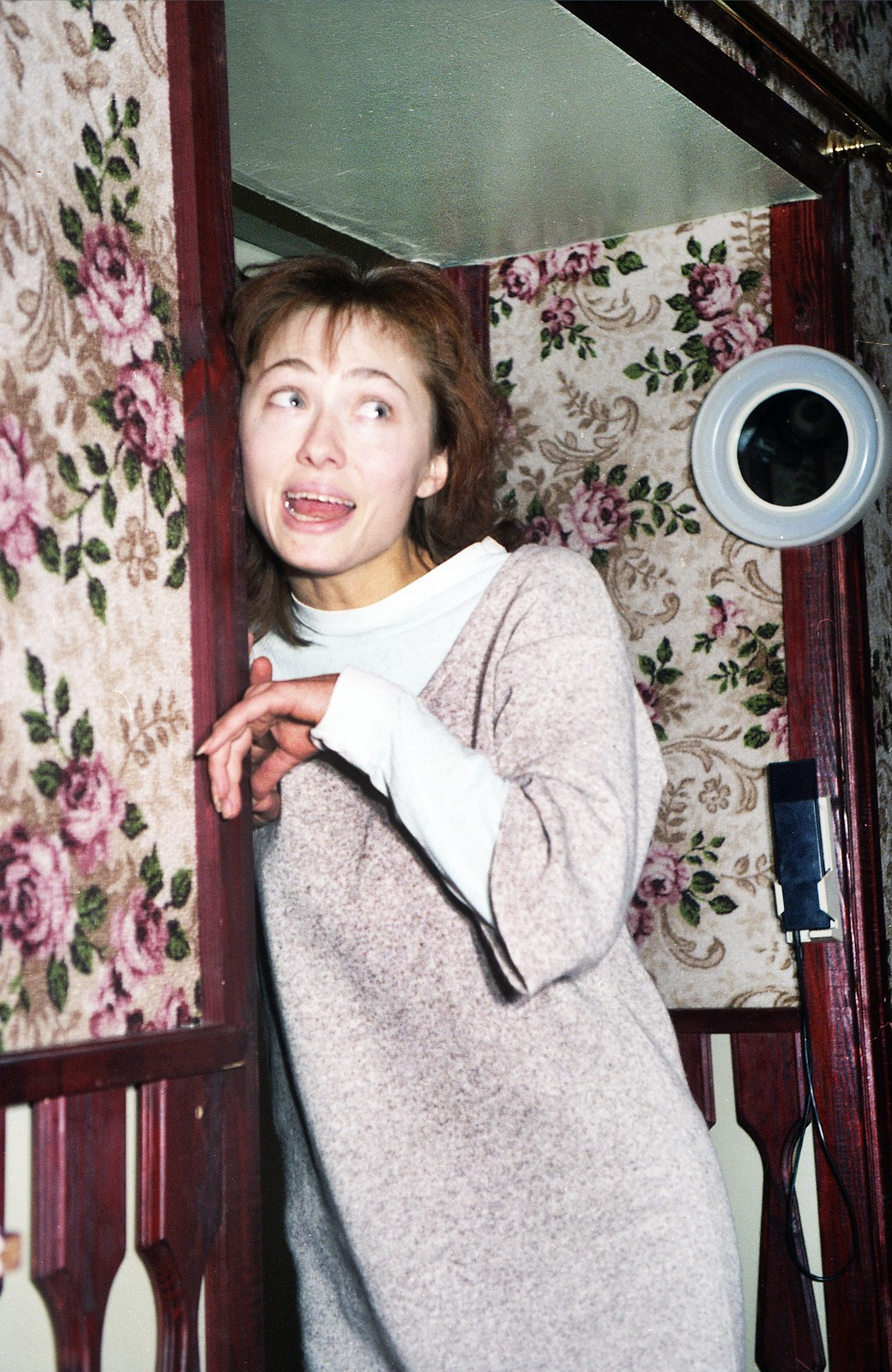
Carmen Mikiver in 1994

Carmen Mikiver (née Uibokant; born on 13 January 1964) is an Estonian actress.

Mikiver was born in Tallinn. In 1989 she graduated from Tallinn Pedagogical Institute in theatrical directing speciality (Estonian: näitejuhtimise eriala). 1987-1993 and 1996-1998 she worked at Estonian Drama Theatre. Since 2002 she is working at Endla Theatre. Besides theatrical roles she has also played in several films.

In 1989, she married actor Mikk Mikiver. The couple remained married until his death in 2006.

== Selected filmography ==
- 1986 Saja aasta pärast mais (role: Alissa)
- 1988 Varastatud kohtumine (role: Sirje)
- 1988 Narva kosk (role: Siina Aunvärk)
- 1990 Ystävät, toverit (Friends, Comrades) (role: Olga)
- 1992 Armastuse lahinguväljad (role: Ilona)
- 1993 Hysteria (role: Mari)
- 1993 Tear of the Prince of Darkness (role: Mimi)
- 1994 Balti armastuslood (role: Ann)
- 2005-2006, 2008–2009 Kodu keset linna (role: Heike)
- 2008 Detsembrikuumus (role: Elsa Kingissepp)
- 2010 Klass: Elu pärast (role: Karmen)
- 2011-2013 Kättemaksukontor (role: Ivi Pihelgas)
- 2013 Karikakramäng II: Hõbepulm (role: Raili)
- 2015 The Fencer (role: Parent at meeting)
- 2015-2016 Viimane võmm (role: Rita Suviste)
- 2017 Minu näoga onu (role: Registrar)
- 2018 Seltsimees laps (role: Hairdresser Carmen)
- 2019 Johannes Pääsukese tõeline elu (role: Gyspy)
- 2021 Sandra saab tööd (role: Investigator)
- 2021: Firebird (role: Army Doctor)
- 2022: Apteeker Melchior. Viirastus (role: Annlinn)
- 2026: Our Erika as Kaagvere direktor – Directed by German Golub
