= Submachine gun =

Type of automatic firearm

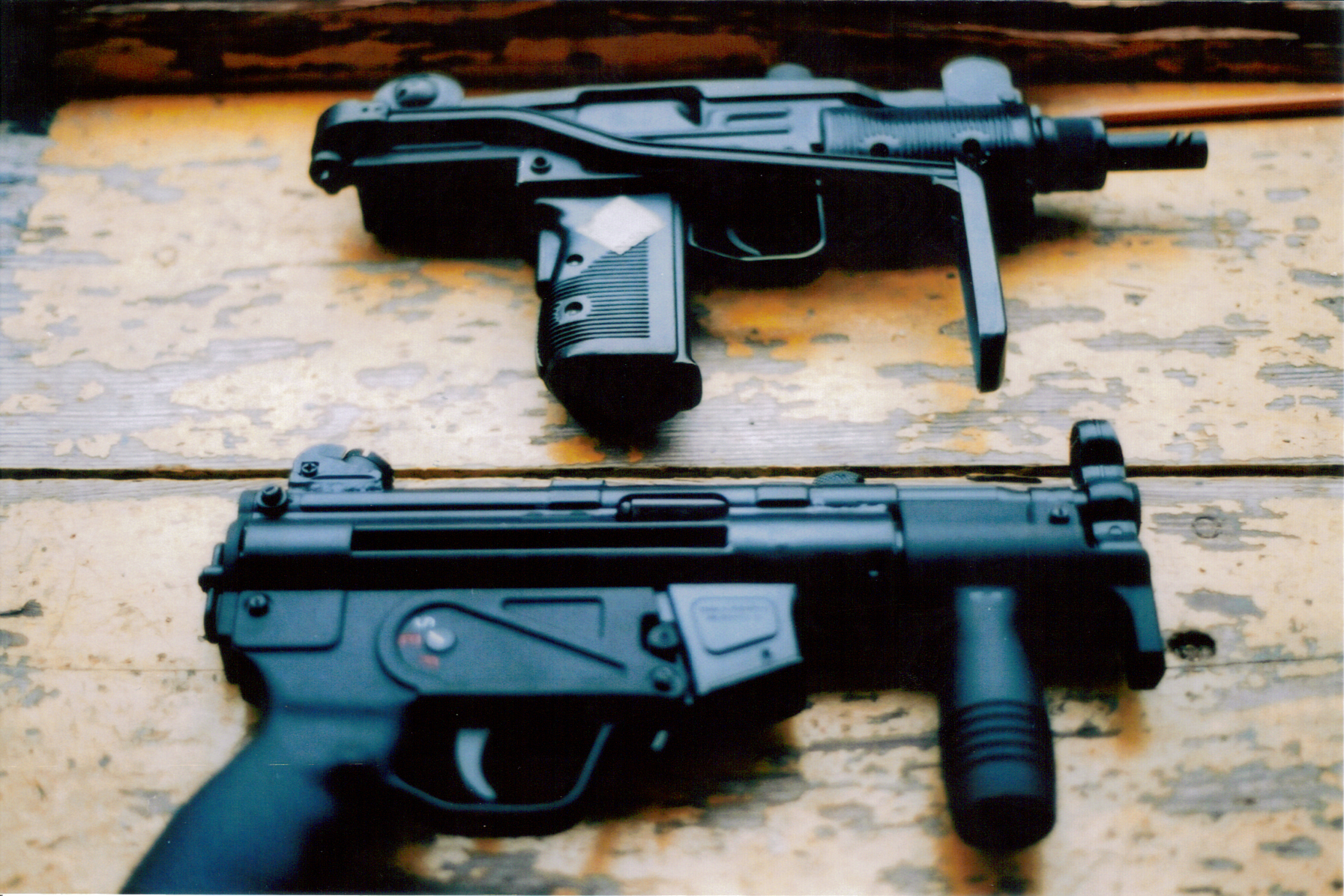
A Mini Uzi and a Heckler & Koch MP5K, two common submachine guns

A submachine gun (SMG) or sub-gun is a magazine-fed automatic carbine designed to fire handgun cartridges. The term "submachine gun" was coined by John T. Thompson, the inventor of the Thompson submachine gun, to describe its design concept as an automatic firearm with notably less firepower than a machine gun (hence the prefix "sub-"). As a machine gun must fire rifle cartridges to be classified as such, submachine guns are not considered machine guns.

In the 20th century, the submachine gun was developed during World War I (1914–1918) as a close-quarter offensive weapon, mainly for trench raiding. At its peak during World War II (1939–1945), millions of submachine guns were made for assault troops and auxiliaries whose doctrines emphasized close-quarter suppressive fire. New submachine gun designs appeared frequently during the Cold War, especially among special forces, commandos and mechanized infantrymen. Submachine gun usage for frontline combat decreased in the 1980s and 1990s.

== Name ==
There are some inconsistencies in the classification of submachine guns. British Commonwealth sources often refer to SMGs as "machine carbines". Other sources refer to SMGs as "machine pistols" because they fire pistol-caliber ammunition, for example, the MP-40 and MP5, where "MP" stands for Maschinenpistole ("machine pistol" in German, but cognate with the English term "submachine gun"). However, the term "machine pistol" is also used to describe a handgun-style firearm capable of fully automatic or burst fire, such as the Stechkin, Beretta 93R, Glock 18, and the H&K VP70. Furthermore, personal defense weapons such as the FN P90 and H&K MP7 are a subset of submachine guns.

== History ==
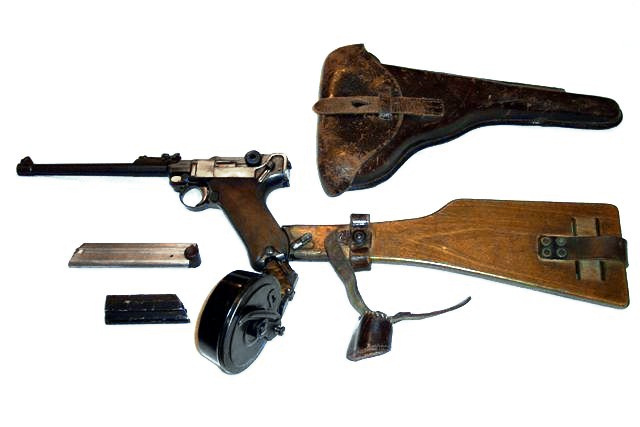
Artillery Luger P08 pistol with snail-drum magazine and removable stock.

Some time around 1890, Hiram Maxim produced the 'miniature Maxim' which was a pistol-caliber Maxim machine gun chambered in 7.63x25 Mauser. This reduced scale Maxim machine gun was used to demonstrate the recoil operated mechanism and was not put into production.

Between 1894 and 1895 a fully automatic Borchardt C93 was demonstrated to the Austrian and United States militaries.

In 1896, a select-fire pistol was patented by the British inventor Hugh Gabbett-Fairfax.

Georg Luger himself demonstrated a ''hand mitrailleuse'' converted from a regular Luger pistol at the 1901 Austrian trials.

In February 1914 Manuel and Everardo Navarro of Celaya, Mexico patented a full auto conversion of the Luger. A spring arm was attached to the sear bar, which would enable automatic fire by adjusting the thumb screw. When fired in full auto it would fire continuously until the user released the grip safety

In April 1914, Abiel Bethel Revelli, an Italian military officer, patented a twin-barreled, magazine-fed automatic gun in a pistol caliber, lighter than a machine gun and shorter than a rifle. A common myth is that this weapon was originally designed as an aircraft gun. In reality ground use was taken into consideration from the very beginning, particularly for the Bersaglieri's cyclist battalions.

=== 20th century ===
==== World Wars ====
===== World War I =====
Stocked pistols were common at the beginning of the 20th century, the Germans initially using heavier versions of the P08 pistol equipped with a detachable stock, larger-capacity snail-drum magazine and a longer barrel.

In 1915, the Kingdom of Italy adopted Revelli's design as the FIAT Mod. 1915. It fired pistol-caliber 9mm Glisenti ammunition, but was not a true submachine gun, as it was originally designed as a mounted weapon.

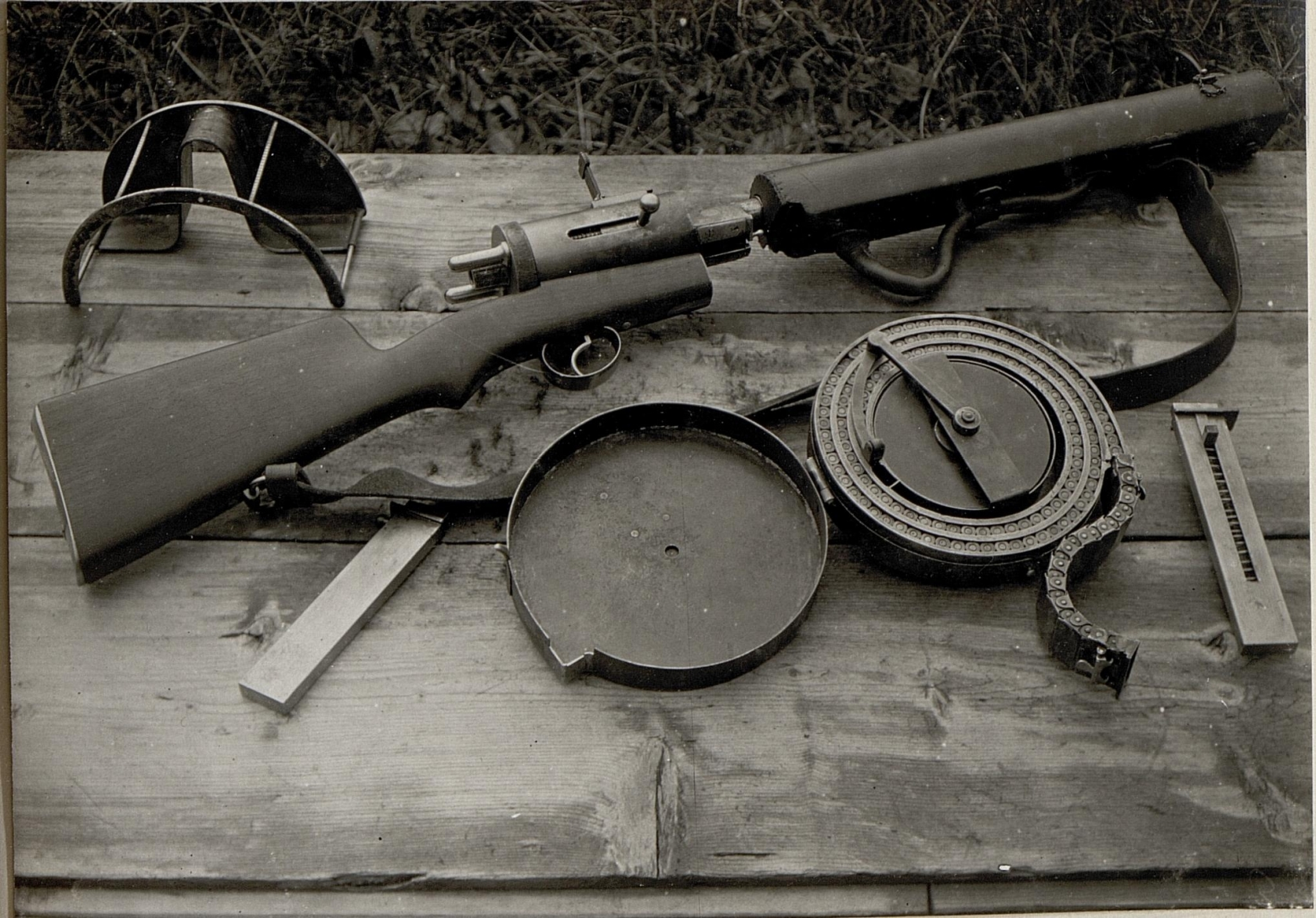
A Standschütze Hellriegel M1915, the first submachine gun with a buttstock, seen here with stick and drum magazines

In late 1915, the first submachine gun with a buttstock was built: the Austro-Hungarian Standschütze Hellriegel M1915 although the weapon was never used in combat.

In February 1916, the Austro-Hungarian first fielded the M.12/P16 machine pistol. This was the first machine pistol to be adopted by any military, being issued to Tyrolean units fighting in the Alps

In 1916, Heinrich Senn of Bern designed a modification of the Swiss Luger pistol to fire in single shots or in full-automatic. Around the same time Georg Luger demonstrated a similar Luger machine pistol which inspired the German Army to develop submachine guns.

Colonel Bethel-Abiel Revelli had already conceived the principles of the submachine gun in September 1915, when he wrote that his gun could be converted to a single-barreled version that "may be mounted in the manner of a rifle so that it may be fired from the shoulder". The FIAT Mod. 1915 would be later modified into the OVP 1918 automatic carbine. The OVP 1918 had a traditional wooden stock, a 25-round top-fed box magazine, and had a cyclic rate of fire of 900 rounds per minute.

By 1918, Bergmann Waffenfabrik had developed the 9x19mm Parabellum MP 18, the first practical submachine gun. This weapon used the same 32-round snail-drum magazine as the Luger P-08. The MP 18 was used in significant numbers by German stormtroopers employing infiltration tactics, achieving some notable successes in the final year of the war. However, these were not enough to prevent Germany's collapse in November 1918. After World War I, the MP 18 evolved into the MP28/II SMG, which incorporated a simple 32-round box magazine, selective fire, and other minor improvements. Though the MP18 had a rather short service life, it was influential in the design of later submachine guns, such as the Lanchester, Sten and PPD-40.

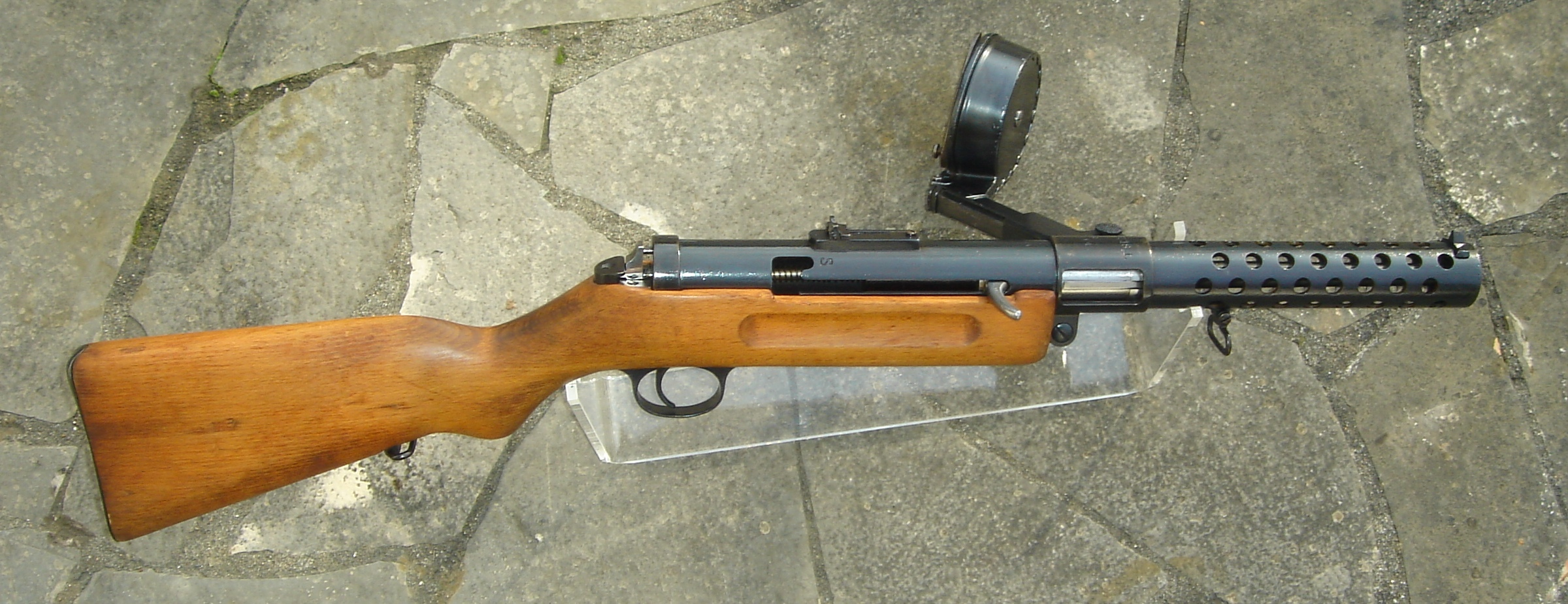
A Bergmann MP 18, the first mass-produced submachine gun to see extensive use in an assault role

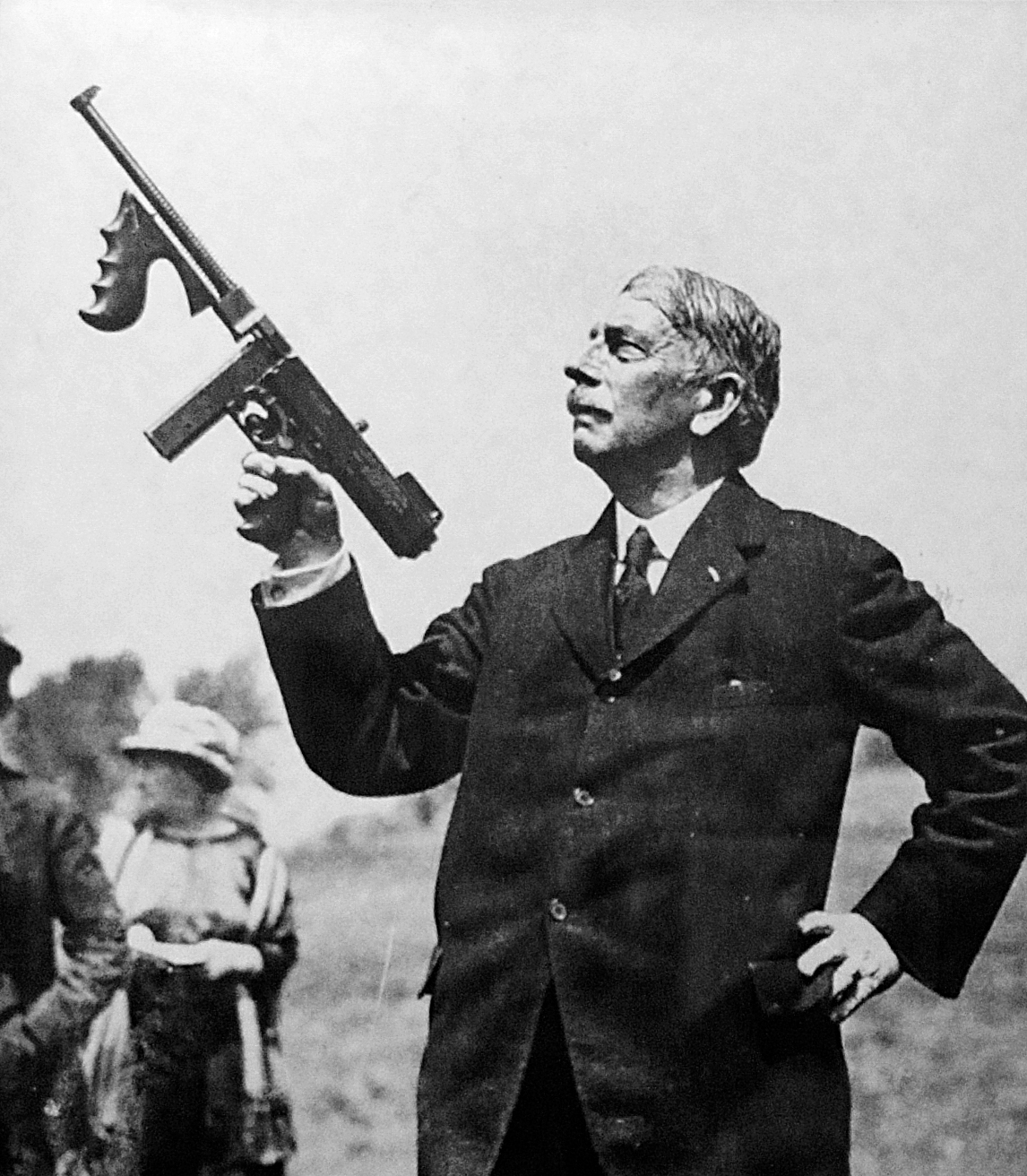
General John T. Thompson holding a Thompson Model 1921

The .45 ACP Thompson submachine gun had been in development at approximately the same time as the Bergmann and the Beretta. However, the war ended before prototypes could be shipped to Europe. Although it had missed its chance to be the first purpose-designed submachine gun to enter service, it became the basis for later weapons, and was much more successful than the submachine guns produced during World War I.

===== Interwar period =====
The Thompson entered production as the M1921. It was available to civilians, but, because of the weapon's high price, initially saw poor sales. The Thompson (with one Type XX 20 round "stick" magazine) had been priced at $200 in 1921 (roughly equivalent to $3,610 in 2025). The Thompson was used in combat that same year:

West Virginia state police bought 37 guns and used them during the Battle of Blair Mountain. Some of the first batches of Thompsons were bought by agents of the Irish Republican Army. They purchased a total of 653 units, though U.S. customs authorities in New York seized 495 of the units in June 1921.

The Thompson, nicknamed "Tommy Gun" or "Chicago Typewriter" became notorious in the U.S. due to its employment by the Mafia: the image of pinstripe-suited James Cagney types wielding drum-magazine Thompsons caused some military planners to shun the weapon. However, the FBI and other U.S. police forces themselves showed no reluctance to use and prominently display these weapons. Eventually, the submachine gun was gradually accepted by many military organizations, especially as World War II loomed, with many countries developing their own designs. The U.S. Marine Corps adopted the Thompson during this period and used them during the Banana Wars in Central America. The gun was also used by the China Marines.

During the 1924 uprising in Estonia, the Soviets supplied four Thompsons to Estonian Communist militants; those were used against Estonian soldiers in a failed attempt to storm the Tallinn barracks. Some of the defenders were armed with the MP18s; and this was possibly the first engagement where submachine guns were used on both sides.

Germany transferred its MP 18s to the German police forces after World War I. They also saw use in the hands of various paramilitary Freikorps during the aftermath of the German Revolution. In the 1920s a new, more reliable box magazine was developed for the MP 18 to replace the older snail-drum magazines. In 1928 a new version of the MP 18, the MP 28, saw the light of day, it featured the new box magazine as standard, a bayonet lug and a single shot mode. The MP 28 was manufactured in Belgium and Spain and was widely exported from there, including to China and South America. Another variant based on the MP 18 was the MP 34 that was manufactured by the Germans through the Swiss front company Solothurn. The MP 34 was manufactured from the very best materials available and finished to the highest possible standard. Consequently, its production costs were extremely high. It was adopted by the Austrian police and army in the 1930s, and they were taken over by the Germans after German annexation of Austria in 1938. The MP35 was another interwar German submachine gun, designed by the Bergmann brothers. It was exported to Sweden and Ethiopia and also saw extensive use in the Spanish Civil War. About 40,000 of the type were manufactured until 1944, with many going into the hands of the Waffen-SS. The Erma EMP was yet another submachine gun from this period, based on a design by Heinrich Vollmer, about 10,000 were manufactured. It was exported to Spain, Mexico, China and Yugoslavia, but also used domestically by the SS, as well as being produced under license in Francoist Spain.

===== World War II =====
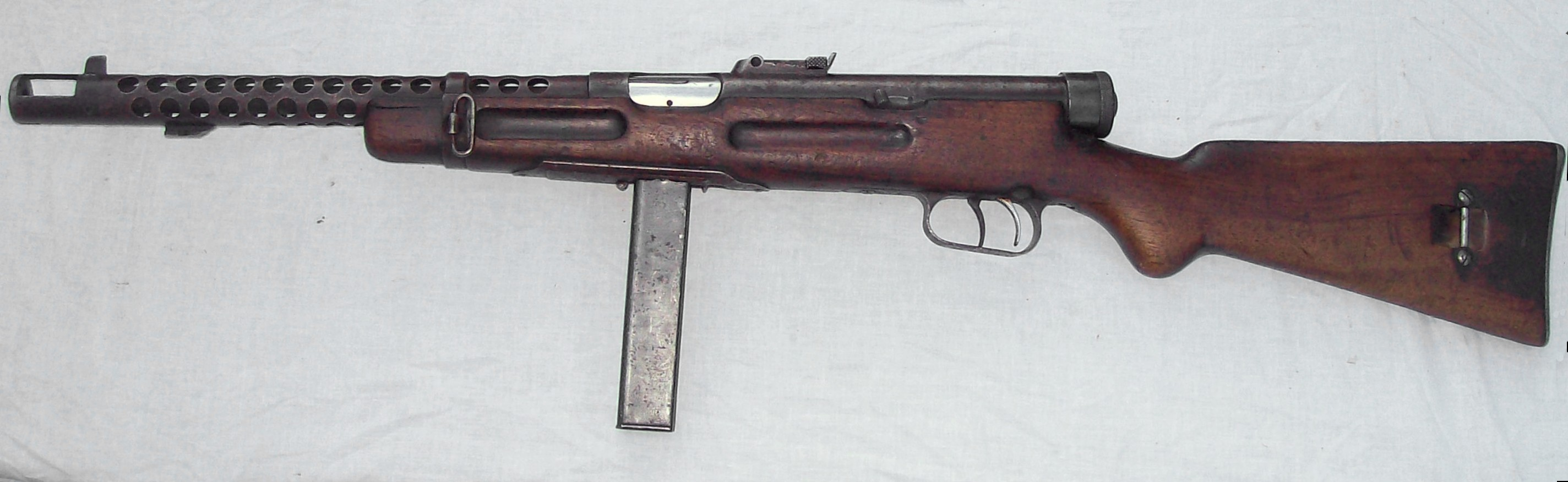
A Beretta Model 38, one of the most successful Italian weapons of World War II

Changes in design accelerated during the war, with one major trend being the abandonment of complex and finely made pre-war designs like the Thompson submachine gun to weapons designed for cheap mass production and easy replacement like the M3 Grease Gun.

While the Italians were among the first to develop submachine guns during World War I, they were slow to produce them under Benito Mussolini; the 9mm Parabellum Beretta Model 38 (MAB 38) was not available in large numbers until 1943. The MAB 38 was made in a series of improved and simplified models all sharing the same basic layout. The MAB 38 has two triggers, the front for semi-auto and rear for full-auto. Most models use standard wooden stocks, although some models were fitted with an MP40-style under-folding stock and are commonly mistaken for it. The MAB 38 series was extremely robust and proved very popular with both Axis and Allied troops (who used captured MAB 38s). It is considered the most successful and effective Italian small arm of World War II. During the later years of the war, the TZ-45 submachine gun was manufactured in small numbers in the Italian Social Republic. A cheaper alternative to the MAB 38, it also sported an unusual grip safety.

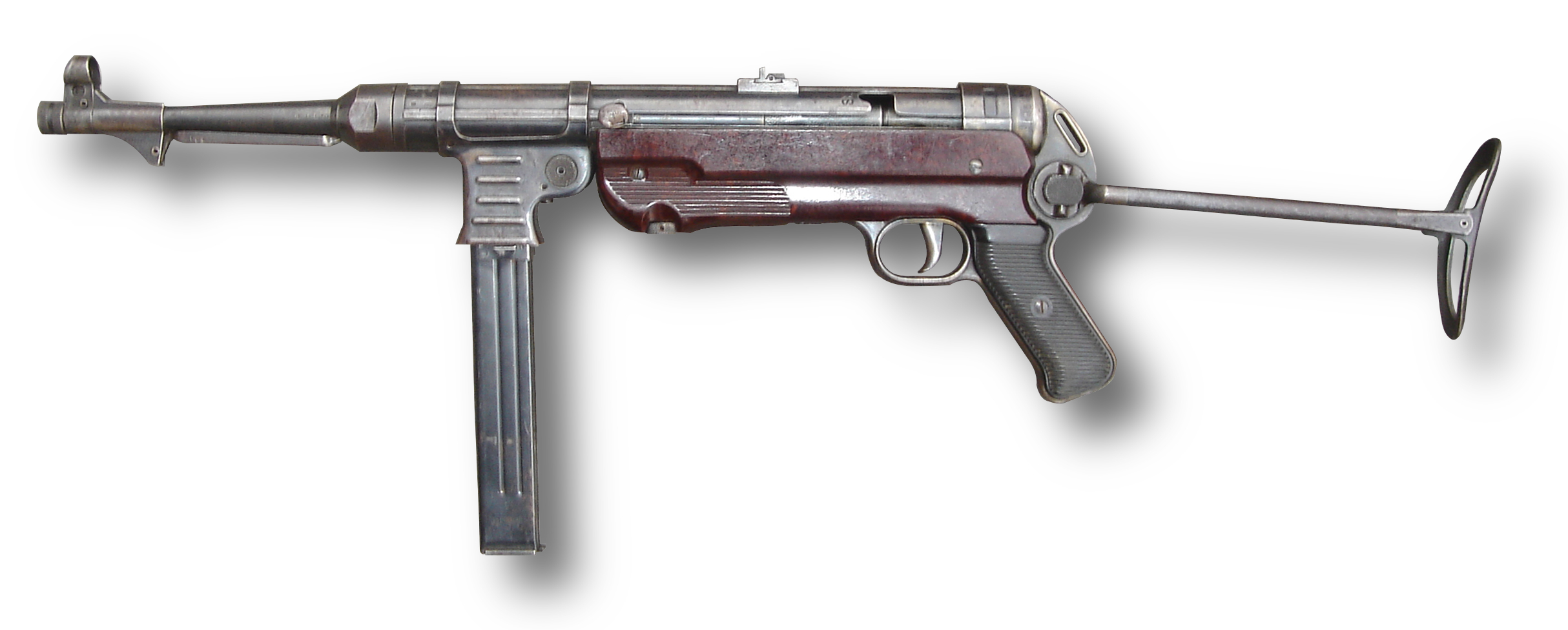
An MP 40 submachine gun with its stock extended

In 1939, the Germans introduced the 9mm Parabellum MP38 which was first used during the invasion of Poland of September that year. The MP38 production was still just starting and only a few thousand were in service at the time. It proved to be far more practical and effective in close-quarters combat than the standard-issue German Karabiner 98k bolt-action rifle. From this experience, the simplified and modernized MP 40 (commonly and erroneously referred to as the Schmeisser) was developed and made in large numbers; about a million were made during World War II. The MP40 was lighter than the MP38. It also used more stamped parts, making it faster and cheaper to produce. The MP38 and MP40 were the first SMGs to use plastic furniture and a practical folding stock, which became standard for all future SMG designs. The Germans used a large number of captured Soviet PPSh-41 submachine guns, some were converted to fire 9mm Parabellum while others were used unmodified (the German 7.63×25mm Mauser cartridge had identical dimensions to the 7.62×25mm Tokarev, albeit slightly less powerful).

During the Winter War, the badly outnumbered Finnish used the Suomi KP/-31 in large numbers against the Russians with devastating effect. Finnish ski troops became known for appearing out of the woods on one side of a road, raking Soviet columns with SMG fire and disappearing back into the woods on the other side. During the Continuation War, the Finnish Sissi patrols often equipped every soldier with KP/-31s. The Suomi fired 9mm Parabellum ammunition from a 71-round drum magazine (although often loaded with 74 rounds). "This SMG showed the world the importance of the submachine gun in modern warfare", prompting the development, adoption and mass production of submachine guns by most of the world's armies. The Suomi was used in combat until the end of the Lapland War, was widely exported and remained in service to the late 1970s. Inspired by captured examples of the Soviet PPS submachine gun, a gun that was cheaper and quicker to manufacture than the Suomi, the Finns introduced the KP m/44 submachine gun in 1944.

In 1940, the Soviets introduced the 7.62×25mm PPD-40 and later the more easily manufactured PPSh-41 in response to their experience during the Winter War against Finland. The PPSh's 71-round drum magazine is a copy of the Suomi's. Later in the war they developed the even more readily mass-produced PPS submachine gun - all firing the same small-caliber but high-powered Tokarev cartridges. The USSR went on to make over 6 million PPSh-41s and 2 million PPS-43s by the end of World War II. Thus, the Soviet Union could field huge numbers of submachine guns against the Wehrmacht, with whole infantry battalions being armed with little else. Even in the hands of conscripts with minimal training, the volume of fire produced by massed submachine guns could be overwhelming.

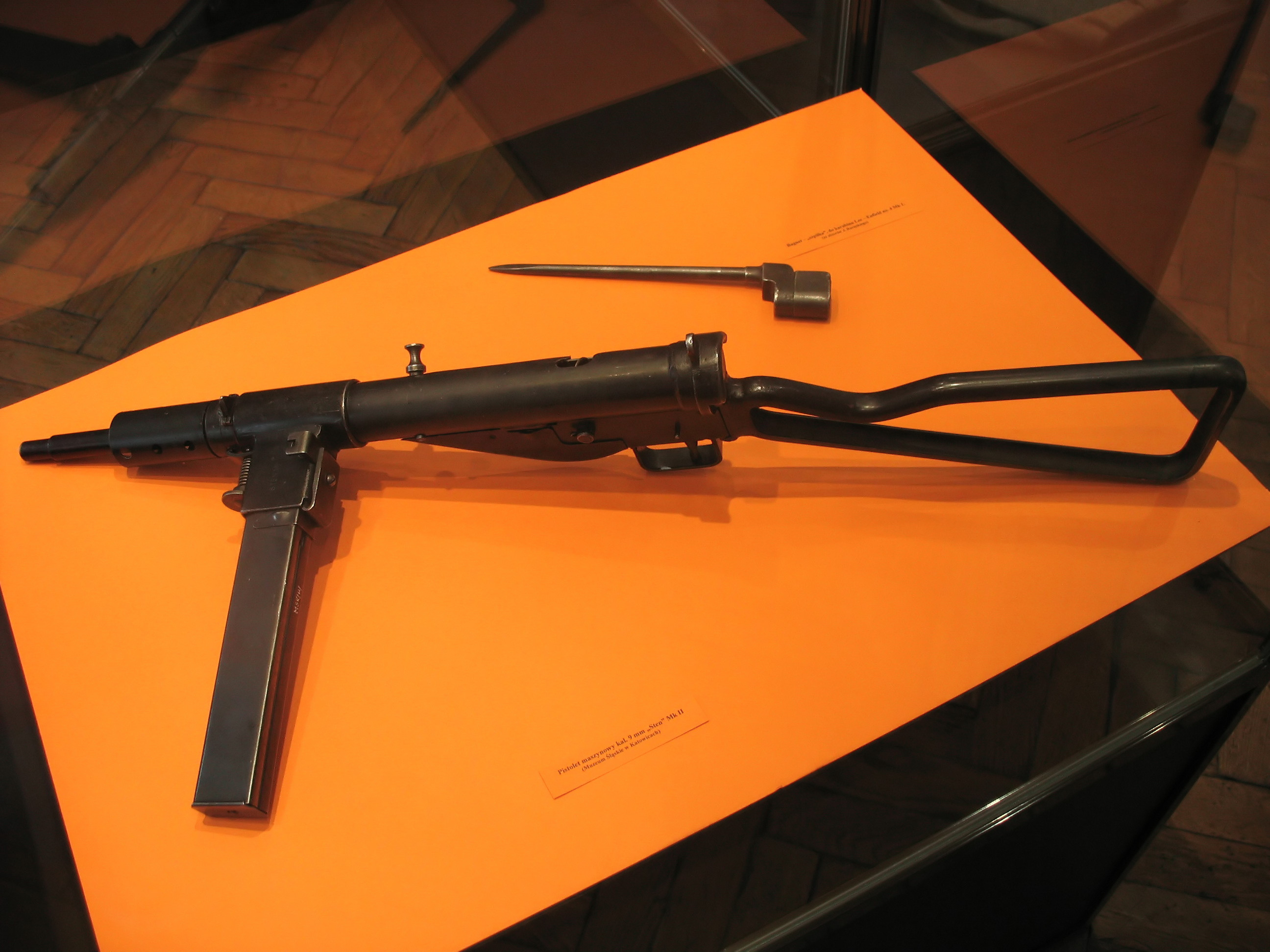
A Sten Mk II, the second most produced submachine gun of World War II

Britain entered the war with no domestic submachine gun design but instead imported the expensive US M1928 Thompson. After evaluating their battlefield experience in the Battle of France and losing many weapons in the Dunkirk evacuation, the Royal Navy adopted the 9mm Parabellum Lanchester submachine gun. With no time for the usual research and development for a new weapon, it was decided to make a direct copy of the German MP 28. Like other early submachine guns it was difficult and expensive to manufacture. Shortly thereafter, the simpler Sten submachine gun was developed for general use by the British armed forces, it was much cheaper and faster to make. Over 4 million Sten guns were made during World War II. The Sten was so cheap and easy to produce that towards the end of the war as their economic base approached crisis, Germany started manufacturing their own copy, the MP 3008. After the war, the British replaced the Sten with the Sterling submachine gun.

The United States and its allies used the Thompson submachine gun, especially the simplified M1. The Thompson was still expensive and slow to produce. Therefore, the U.S. developed the M3 submachine gun or "Grease Gun" in 1942, followed by the improved M3A1 in 1944. While the M3 was no more effective than the Tommy Gun, it was made primarily of stamped parts and welded together and could be produced much faster and at a fraction of the cost of a Thompson; its much lower rate of fire made it a lot more controllable. It could be configured to fire either .45 ACP or 9mm Luger ammunition. The M3A1 was among the longest-serving submachine gun designs, being produced into the 1960s and serving in US forces into the 1990s.

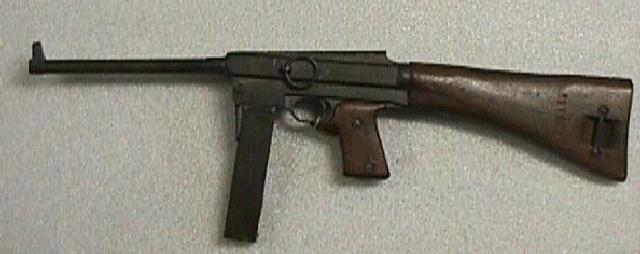
The MAS-38 was France's only WWII submachine gun design, but France was defeated before very many were manufactured.

France produced only about 2,000 of the MAS-38 submachine gun (chambered in 7.65×20mm Longue) before the Fall of France in June 1940. Production was taken over by the occupying Germans, who used them for themselves and also put them into the hands of the Vichy French.

The Owen gun is a 9mm Parabellum Australian submachine gun designed by Evelyn Owen in 1939. The Owen is a simple, highly reliable, open bolt, blowback SMG. It was designed to be fired either from the shoulder or the hip. It is easily recognisable, owing to its unconventional appearance, including a quick-release barrel and butt-stock, double pistol grips, top-mounted magazine, and unusual offset right-side-mounted sights. The Owen was the only entirely Australian-designed and constructed service submachine gun of World War II and was used by the Australian Army from 1943 until the mid-1960s, when it was replaced by the F1 submachine gun. Only about 45,000 Owens were produced during the war for a unit cost of about A$30.

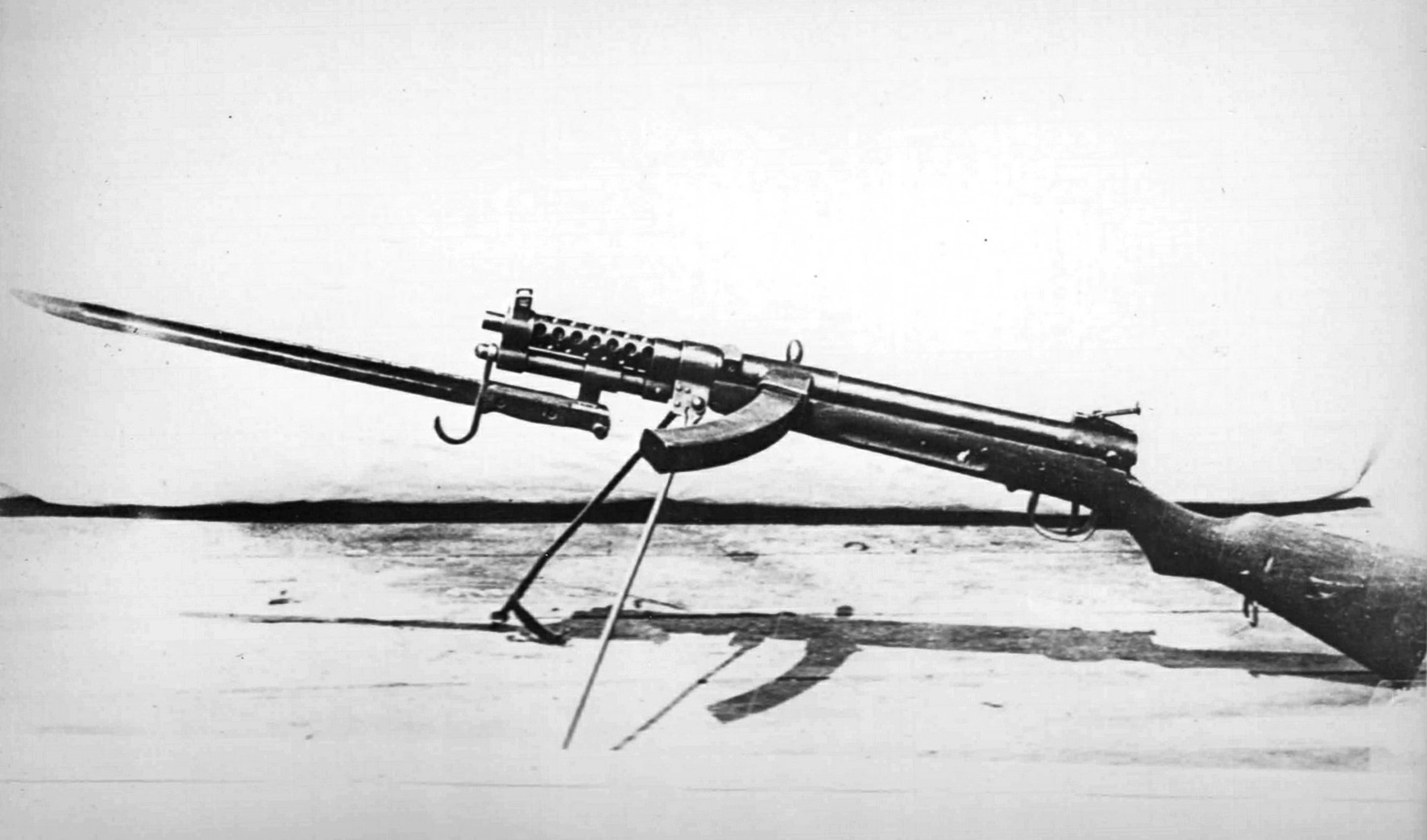
A Type 100 submachine gun with bayonet

While most other countries during World War II developed submachine guns, the Empire of Japan had only produced one, the Type 100 submachine gun, based heavily on the German MP28. Like most other small arms created in Imperial Japan, the Type 100 could be fitted with the Type 30 bayonet. It used the 8×22mm Nambu cartridge, which was about half as powerful as a standard Western 9mm Parabellum round. Production of the gun was even more inadequate: by the war's end, Japan had only manufactured about 7,500 of the Type 100, whereas Germany, America, and other countries in the war had produced well over a million of their own SMG designs.

The German military concluded that most firefights took place at ranges of no more than ~300 yd (270 m). They therefore sought to develop a new class of weapon that would combine the high volume of fire of the submachine gun with an intermediate cartridge that enabled the shooter to place accurate shots at medium ranges (beyond that of the 100–200 yd (91–183 m) range of the typical submachine gun). After a false start with the FG 42, this led to the development of the Sturmgewehr 44 select-fire assault rifle (assault rifle or storm rifle is a translation of the German Sturmgewehr). In the years following the war, this new format began to replace the submachine gun in military use to a large extent. Based on the StG44, the Soviet Union created the AK-47, which is to date the world's most produced firearm, with over 100 million made.

===== Post–World War II =====
After World War II, "new submachine gun designs appeared almost every week to replace the admittedly rough and ready designs which had appeared during the war. Some (the better ones) survived, most rarely got past the glossy brochure stage." Most of these survivors were cheaper, easier, and faster to make than their predecessors. As such, they were widely distributed.

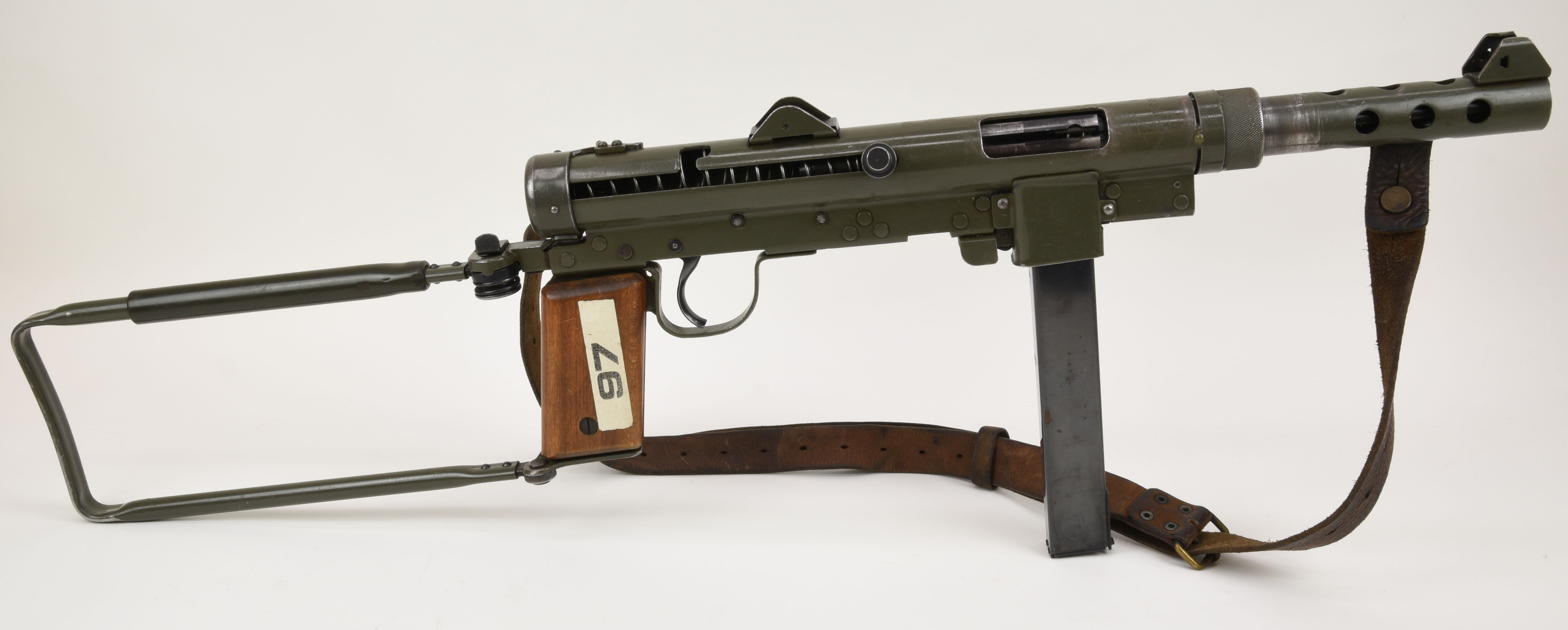
A Carl Gustaf m/45

In 1945, Sweden introduced the 9 mm Parabellum Carl Gustaf m/45 with a design borrowing from and improving on many design elements of earlier submachine-gun designs. It has a tubular stamped steel receiver with a side folding stock. The m/45 was widely exported and especially popular with CIA operatives and U.S. special forces during the Vietnam War. In U.S. service it was known as the "Swedish-K". In 1966, the Swedish government blocked the sale of firearms to the United States because it opposed the Vietnam War. As a result, in the following year Smith & Wesson began to manufacture an m/45 clone called the M76. The m/45 was used in combat by Swedish troops as part of the United Nations Operation in the Congo, during the Congo Crisis during the early 1960s. Battlefield reports of the lack of penetrative power of the 9mm Parabellum during this operation led to Sweden developing a more powerful 9 mm round designated "9mm m/39B".

In 1946, Denmark introduced the Madsen M-46 and, in 1950, an improved model, the Madsen M-50. These 9 mm Parabellum stamped steel SMGs featured a unique clamshell type design, a side-folding stock, and a grip safety on the magazine housing. The Madsen was widely exported and especially popular in Latin America, with variants made by several countries.

In 1948, Czechoslovakia introduced the Sa vz. 23 series. This 9 mm Parabellum SMG introduced several innovations: a progressive trigger for selecting between semi-automatic and full auto fire, a telescoping bolt that extends forward wrapping around the barrel, and a vertical handgrip housing the magazine and trigger mechanism. The vz. 23 series was widely exported and especially popular in Africa and the Middle East with variants made by several countries. The vz. 23 inspired the development of the Uzi submachine gun.

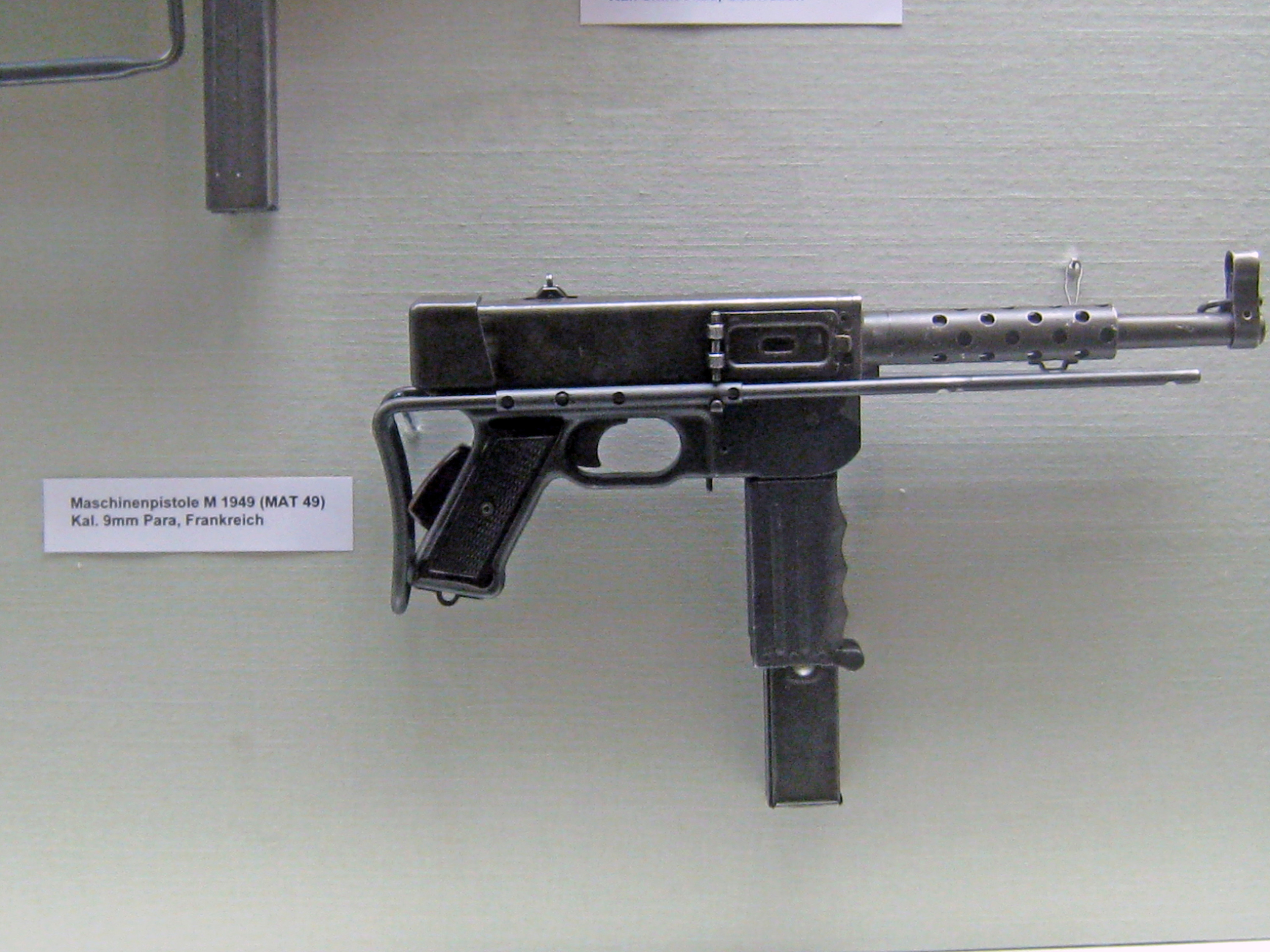
MAT-49 on display

In 1949, France introduced the MAT-49 to replace the hodgepodge of French, American, British, German, and Italian SMGs in French service after World War II. The 9 mm Parabellum MAT-49 is an inexpensive stamped-steel SMG with a telescoping wire stock, a pronounced folding magazine housing, and a grip safety. This "wildebeast-like design" proved to be an extremely reliable and effective SMG and was used by the French well into the 1980s. It was also widely exported to Africa, Asia, and the Middle East.

==== Cold War ====
===== 1950s =====
In 1954, Israel introduced a 9mm Parabellum open-bolt, blowback-operated submachine gun called the Uzi (after its designer Uziel Gal). The Uzi was one of the first weapons to use a telescoping bolt design with the magazine housed in the pistol grip for a shorter weapon. The Uzi has become the most popular submachine gun in the world, with over 10 million units sold, more than any other submachine gun.

In 1959, Beretta introduced the Model 12. This 9mm Parabellum submachine gun was a complete break with previous Beretta designs. It is a small, compact, very well made SMG and among the first to use a telescoping bolt design. The M12 was designed for mass production and was made largely of stamped steel and welded together. It is identified by its tubular shape receiver, double pistol grips, a side folding stock and the magazine housed in front of the trigger guard. The M12 uses the same magazines as the Model 38 series.

====== Submachine guns in the Korean War ======
Submachine guns again proved to be an important weapon system in the Korean War (25 June 1950 – 27 July 1953). The Korean People's Army (KPA) and the Chinese People's Volunteer Army (PVA) fighting in Korea received massive numbers of the PPSh-41, in addition to the North Korean Type 49 and the Chinese Type 50, which were both licensed copies of the PPSh-41 with small mechanical revisions. While lacking the accuracy of the U.S. M1 Garand and M1 carbine, it provided more firepower at short distances and was well-suited to the close-range firefights that typically occurred in that conflict, especially at night. United Nations Command forces in defensive outposts or on patrol often had trouble returning a sufficient volume of fire when attacked by companies of infantry armed with the PPSh. As infantry Captain (later General) Hal Moore stated: "on full automatic it sprayed a lot of bullets and most of the killing in Korea was done at very close ranges and it was done quickly—a matter of who responded faster. In situations like that it outclassed and outgunned what we had. A close-in patrol fight was over very quickly and usually we lost because of it." U.S. servicemen, however, felt that their M2 carbines were superior to the PPSh-41 at the typical engagement range of 100–150 meters.

Other older designs also saw use in the Korean War. The Thompson had seen much use by the U.S. and South Korean militaries, even though the Thompson had been replaced as standard-issue by the M3/M3A1. With huge numbers of guns available in army ordnance arsenals, the Thompson remained classed as "limited standard" or "substitute standard" long after the standardization of the M3/M3A1. Many Thompsons were distributed to the US-backed Nationalist Chinese armed forces as military aid before the fall of Chiang Kai-shek's government to Mao Zedong's communist forces at the end of the Chinese Civil War in 1949. (Thompsons had already been widely used throughout China since the 1920s, at a time when several Chinese warlords and their military factions running various parts of the fragmented country made purchases of the weapon and then subsequently produced many local copies.) US troops were surprised to encounter communist Chinese troops armed with Thompsons (among other captured US-made Nationalist Chinese and American firearms), especially during unexpected night assaults, which became a prominent Chinese combat tactic in the conflict. The gun's ability to deliver large quantities of short-range automatic assault fire proved very useful in both defense and assault during the early part of the war when it was constantly mobile and shifting back and forth. Many Chinese Thompsons were captured and placed into service with American soldiers and marines for the remaining period of the war.

===== 1960s =====
In the 1960s, Heckler & Koch developed the 9mm Parabellum MP5 submachine gun. The MP5 is based on the G3 rifle and uses the same closed-bolt roller-delayed blowback operation system. This makes the MP5 more accurate than open-bolt SMGs, such as the Uzi. The MP5 is one of the most widely used submachine guns in the world, having been adopted by over 40 nations and numerous military, law enforcement, and security organizations.

In 1969, Steyr introduced the MPi 69, which is similar in appearance to the Uzi SMG. The MPi 69's receiver is a squared stamped steel tube that partly nestles inside a large plastic molding (resembling a lower receiver) which contains the forward hand-grip, vertical pistol-grip and the fire control group, making the MPi 69 one of the first firearms to use plastic construction in this way.

===== 1970s =====
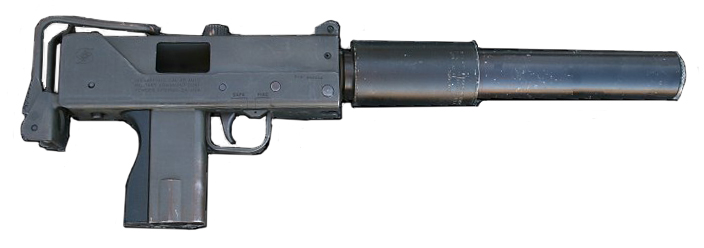
An Ingram MAC-10 with a suppressor, magazine detached

In the 1970s, extremely compact submachine guns, such as the .45 ACP MAC-10 and .380 ACP MAC-11, were developed to be used with silencers or suppressors. While these SMGs received enormous publicity, and were prominently displayed in films and television, they were not widely adopted by military or law enforcement agencies.

===== 1980s =====
By the 1980s, the demand for new submachine guns was very low and could be easily met by existing makers with existing designs. However, following H&K's lead, other manufacturers began designing submachine guns based on their existing assault rifle patterns. These new SMGs offered a high degree of parts commonality with parent weapons, thereby easing logistical concerns.

In 1982, Colt introduced the Colt 9mm SMG based on the M16 rifle. The Colt SMG is a closed bolt, blowback operated SMG and the overall aesthetics are identical to most M16 type rifles. The magazine well is modified using a special adapter to allow the use of the smaller 9mm magazines. The magazines themselves are a copy of the Israeli Uzi SMG magazine, modified to fit the Colt and lock the bolt back after the last shot. The Colt was widely used by US law enforcement and the USMC.

==== 1990s ====
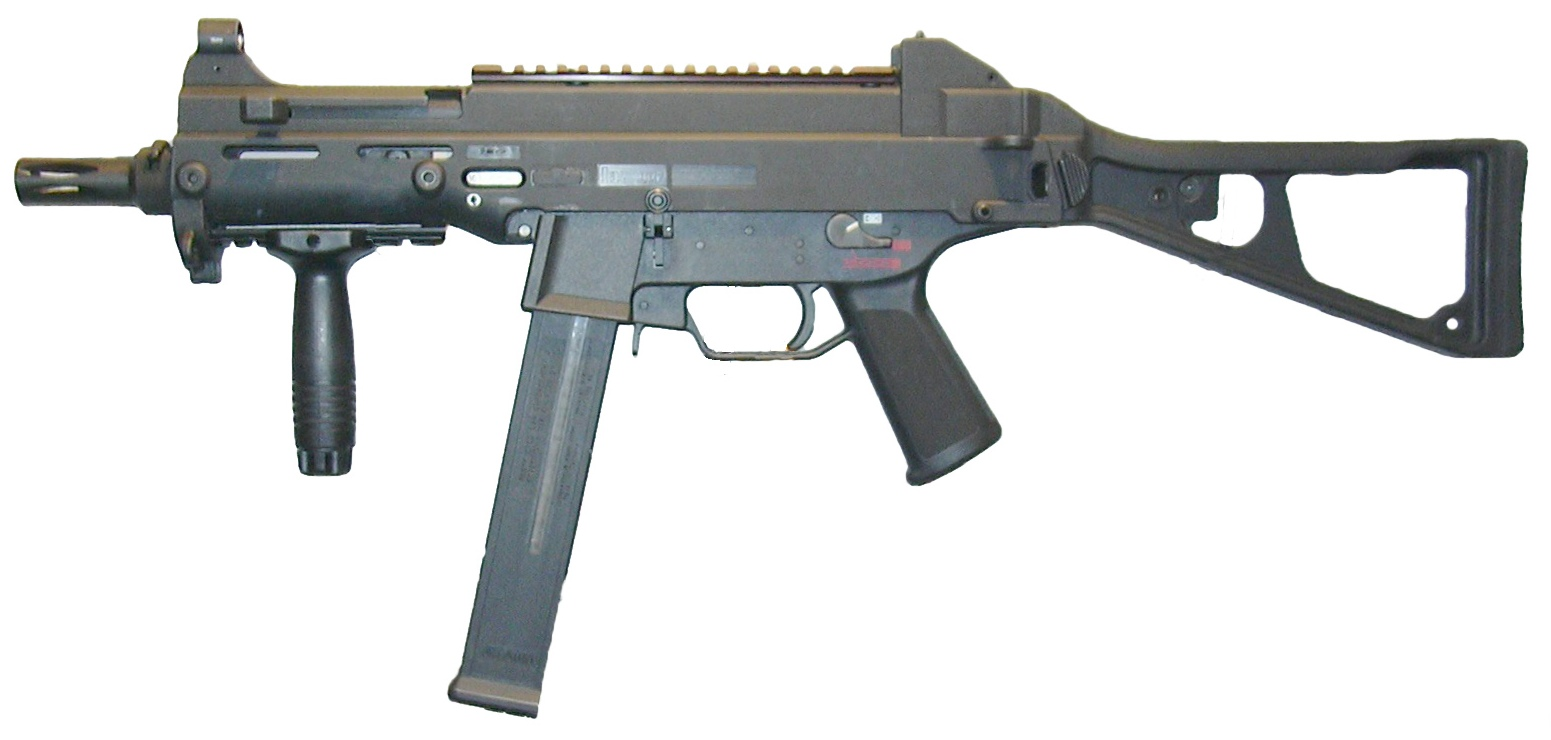
A Heckler & Koch UMP45 with a vertical foregrip

In 1999, H&K introduced the UMP "Universal Machine Pistol". The UMP is a 9mm Parabellum, .40 S&W, or .45 ACP, closed-bolt blowback-operated SMG, based on the H&K G36 assault rifle. It features a predominantly polymer construction and was designed to be a more cost effective, lighter weight, and less complex design alternative to the MP5. The UMP has a side-folding stock and is available with four different trigger group configurations. It was also designed to use a wide range of Picatinny rail mounted accessories

=== 21st century ===
==== 2000s ====
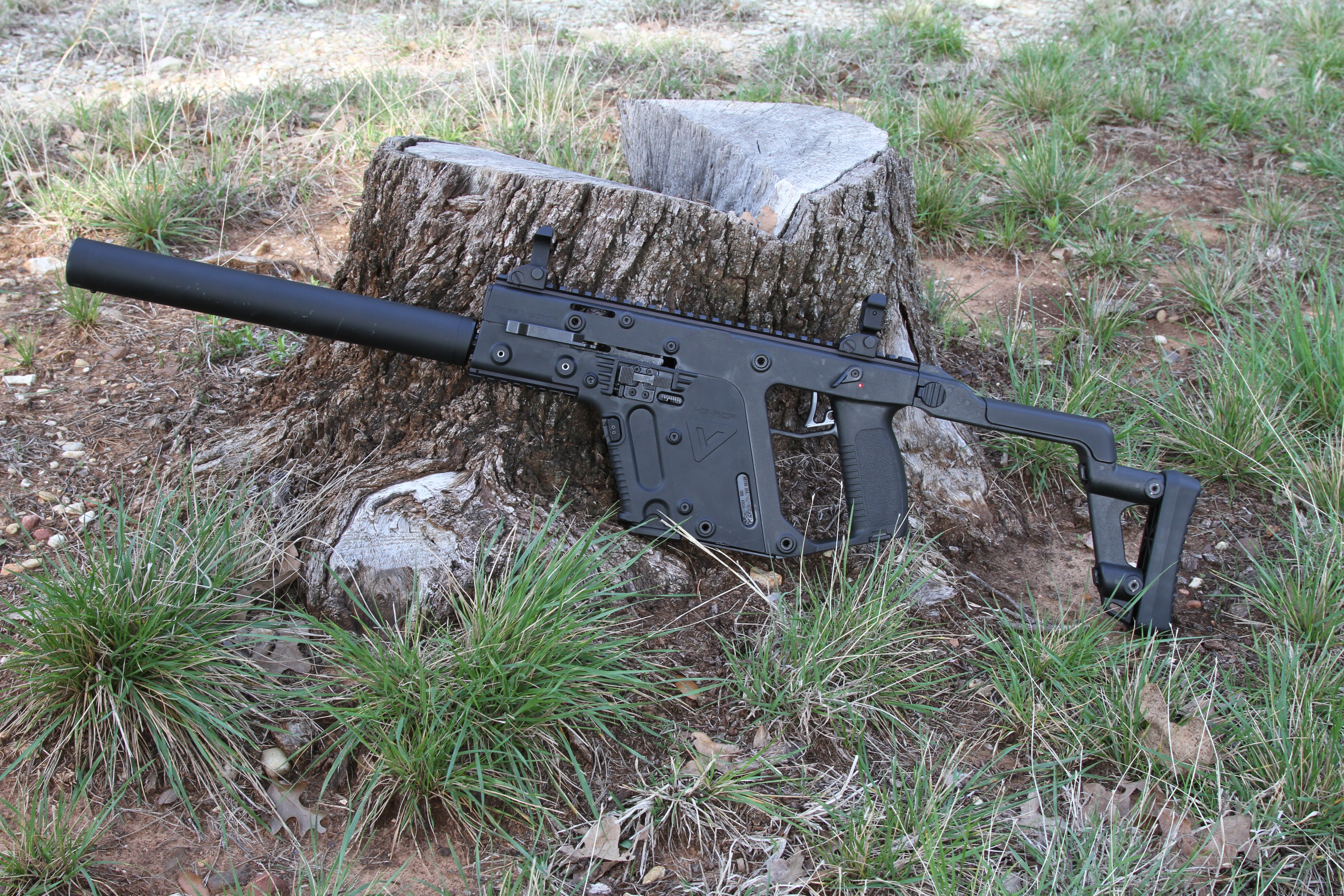
A KRISS Vector, seen here with a suppressor

In 2004, Izhmash introduced the Vityaz-SN a 9mm Parabellum, closed bolt straight blowback operated submachine gun. It is based on the AK-74 rifle and offers a high degree of parts commonality with the AK-74. It is the standard submachine gun for all branches of Russian military and police forces.

In 2009, KRISS USA introduced the KRISS Vector family of submachine guns. Futuristic in appearance, the KRISS uses an unconventional delayed blowback system combined with in-line design to reduce perceived recoil and muzzle climb. The KRISS comes in 9mm Parabellum, .40 S&W, .45 ACP, 9×21mm, 10mm Auto, and .357 SIG. It also uses standard Glock pistol magazines.

==== 2010s ====
By the early 2010s, compact assault rifles and personal defense weapons had replaced submachine guns in most roles. Factors such as the increasing use of body armor and logistical concerns have combined to limit the appeal of submachine guns. However, submachine guns are still used by police (especially SWAT teams) for dealing with heavily armed suspects and by military special forces units for close-quarters combat, due to their reduced size, recoil and muzzle blast, and capability for sound suppression. Submachine gun designs adopted during this period include the Brügger & Thomet APC and SIG MPX.

=== Adjacent weapon developments ===
==== Land defense pistol ====
During the Apartheid era of South Africa and the Rhodesian Bush War/South African Border War, a semi-automatic only pistol calibre carbine based on submachine guns existed for civilian personal protection as Land Defence Pistols (LDP). Known examples were the Bell & White 84, BHS Rhogun, Cobra Mk1, GM-16, Kommando LDP, Northwood R-76, Paramax, Sanna 77 and TS III.

==== Personal defense weapons ====
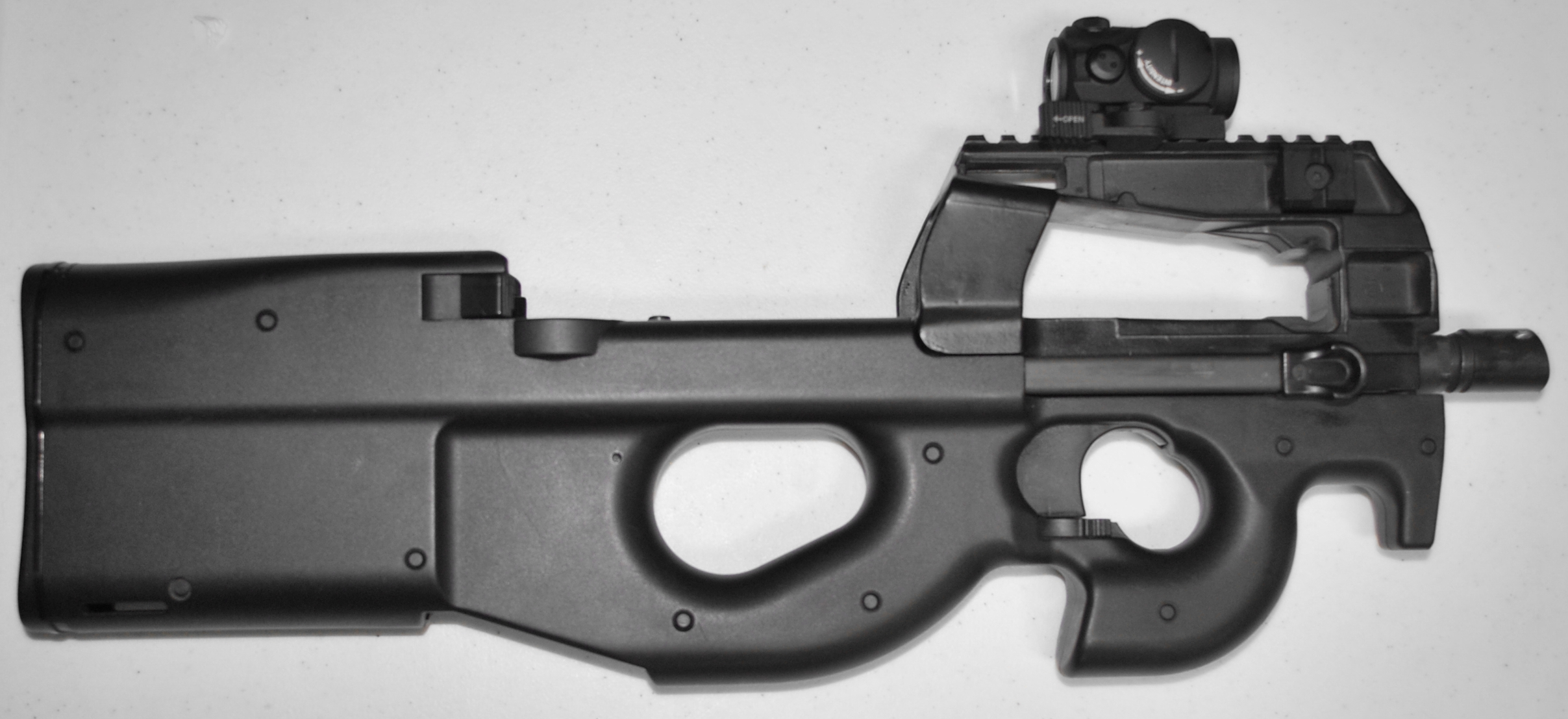
An FN P90 personal defense weapon

First developed during the 1980s, personal defense weapons (PDWs) were created in response to a NATO request for a replacement for 9×19mm Parabellum submachine guns. PDWs are compact automatic weapons that are sufficiently light to be issued to non-combat arms or support troops, particularly those in vehicles, while being capable of greater range and terminal ballistics than a handgun. As a result of these characteristics, most PDWs can be used as close-quarters battle weapons for special forces and counter-terrorist groups.

Introduced in 1991, the FN P90 features an unusual appearance, having a 50-round magazine housed horizontally above the barrel, an integrated reflex sight and fully ambidextrous controls. A simple blowback automatic weapon, it was designed to fire the proprietary FN 5.7×28mm cartridge which can penetrate soft body armor. The FN P90 was designed to have a length no greater than an average-sized man's shoulder width, to allow it to be easily carried and maneuvered in tight spaces, such as the inside of an infantry fighting vehicle. The FN P90 is currently in service with military and police forces in over 40 nations.

== See also ==
- Assault rifle
- Firearm action
- List of submachine guns
- Machine gun
- Machine pistol
- Overview of gun laws by nation
- Personal defense weapon
- Semi-automatic pistol
