= Karl Kark =

Estonian politician

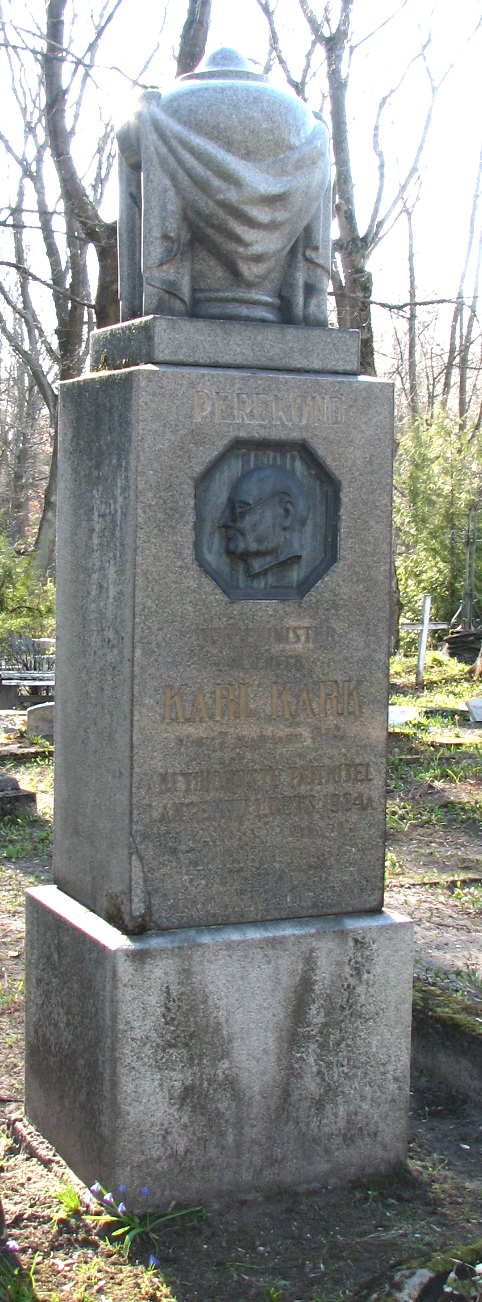
Grave of Karl Kark at Vana-Kaarli Cemetery in Tallinn

Karl Kark (22 December 1884 – 1 December 1924) was an Estonian civil engineer and politician.

In 1924 he was Minister of Transportation. On the morning of 1 December 1924, Kark was assassinated by gunshot by communist insurgents at the Tallinn Baltic Station during the 1924 Estonian coup d'état attempt. He was buried in Tallinn's Vana-Kaarli Cemetery, within the larger Siselinna Cemetery.
