= Asko Kase =

Estonian film director

Asko Kase (born 26 February 1979 in Tallinn) is an Estonian film and television director.

In 2009 his film "December Heat" was nominated in 82nd Academy Awards for Best Foreign Language Film (see the list).

Asko has a minor acting career, having played roles in the movie "Made in Estonia", and TV series "Revenge Office" in 2011-2022.

== Filmography ==
Year	Title	Notes	Ref(s).
2001	Buddha	Also a writer	
2001	Linnapiloot		
2003	Vanad ja kobedad ilma grimmita		
2003	Eesti lood		
2003	Konfiskeeritud		
2004	Kooma		
2006	Eesti Rulett	Also a writer	
2006	Hundi agoonia	Also an editor	
2007	Zen läbi prügi	Also an editor and writer	
2008	Katkised Suhted	Also an editor and writer	
2008	December Heat		
2012	Meie aasta Siberis		
2015	Meie aasta Hiinas		
2016	Meie aasta Austraalias		
2018	Meie aasta Iraanis		
2018	Meie suvi iraanlastega		
2019	Meie aasta Aafrikas		
2020-2021	Meie aasta Indias		
2021	Tuuli Roosma Mees	Also an editor	
2025	Meie aasta Jaapaanis	Also an editor	
2025	Meie aasta Brasillias	Also an editor	
