= OVP 1918 =

OVP
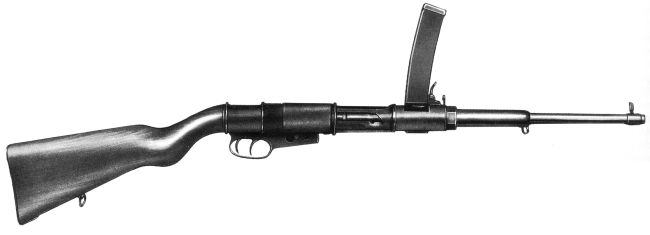
- Type: Submachine gun
- Place of origin: Italy

Service history
- In service: 1918
- Used by: Italy; Ethiopia
- Wars: World War I(possibly); Second Italo-Ethiopian War; World War II

Production history
- Manufacturer: Officine di Villar Perosa
- Produced: 1918
- No. built: 500

Specifications
- Mass: 3.6 kg (7 lb 15 oz)
- Length: 902 mm (2 ft 11.5 in)
- Barrel length: 279 mm (11.0 in)
- Cartridge: 9mm Glisenti
- Caliber: 9mm
- Action: Delayed blowback, selective fire
- Rate of fire: 900 rpm cyclic
- Muzzle velocity: 318 m/s (1,000 ft/s)
- Feed system: 25 round detachable box magazine

The Carabinetta Automatica O.V.P was a submachine gun developed in Italy for service during World War I.

== Development ==
At the end of 1916, Major Bethel-Abiel Revelli, designer of the Villar Perosa, demonstrated a new weapon to the Department of Air Artillery which was called the Carabinetta Automatica O.V.P. The weapon was an attempt to adapt the Villar Perosa into a single-barreled, shoulder-fired carbine, on the request of the Aviation Corps who wanted a replacement for the Mauser C96 as a personal defence weapon for aviators.

The OVP was little more than the barrel and action of the VP attached to a wooden buttstock and provided with a trigger and some small refinements.

Although formally classed as a delayed blowback, the delay is minimal and certainly had little practical effect as seen by the high rate of fire. The mechanism is the usual one of bolt and return spring, but the bolt is controlled by a track in the receiver body that causes the bolt to rotate 45 degrees as it closes. The striker carries a lug bearing on the receiver track that also bears on a cam face on the bolt, so that the firing pin, driven by the return spring, cannot go forward to fire the cartridge until the bolt has rotated. When the gun is fired, recoil of the cartridge case moves the bolt back, causing it to rotate to the unlocked position, during which movement the pin is withdrawn by the action of the bolt's cam surface. Once unlocked the bolt is free to recoil and complete the firing cycle.

An unusual feature of the OVP that was not on the original VP gun was the use of a cylindrical sleeve surrounding the receiver for cocking the weapon. This was grasped and pulled to the rear to retract the bolt and then pushed forward during firing. Another oddity, this time carried over from the VP, was the provision of a slot in the rear edge of the top mounted magazine that allowed the firer to see how many rounds remained inside it. However, this also allowed dust and dirt to enter the magazine.

The O.V.P. submachine gun was trialed again in February 1917 and patented in March. The patent sketch depicts a few design features that would not be present in the production model, including the placement of the magazine feed on the underside of the receiver, and centrally mounted iron sights which would be replaced in the final model with offset, left-mounted sights. It is possible that this magazine arrangement was abandoned because the Villar Perosa magazines performed better with gravity assistance. It is not known whether the prototype tested in 1916 and early 1917 was built with the unusual features seen on the patent sketch, but in any case the final production model was not.

== History ==
Requirement for a weapon of this type was decided by the Aviation Corps upon experiencing difficulty requisitioning Mauser C96 pistols. Due to the war the Italian government could not place further orders from the Mauser factory. Purchases of C96 copies from other countries, including China, managed to ward off the adoption of the O.V.P until May 1918, when it officially came into service as the C96's replacement. Its adoption was also approved by the Naval Aviation Corps. Some 500 submachine guns (recorded as Carabine .V.P.) were delivered to the Aviation Corps in 1918. It is generally believed that these were the only such guns ever produced. These guns were distributed to pilots and observers in the last year of the war; a known user of the O.V.P. submachine gun was the famous aviator Antonio Locatelli.

Contrary to popular belief, the O.V.P. submachine gun was not issued to infantry assault units. The army held their own separate submachine gun trials which compared designs by Beretta, Ansaldo, SIAI Savoia, Cei-Rigotti, and A.N. The Beretta gun was adopted in September 1918 as the Moschetto Automatico Revelli-Beretta Mod. 1915 (commonly known as the "Beretta Model 1918"); however, it was ultimately only adopted in semi-automatic form.

After the war, the immediate requirement for the O.V.P. submachine gun disappeared and production likely ceased. O.V.P. split with Fiat in 1919 and suspended armaments manufacture. A small number of O.V.P. submachine guns remained in Italian service, however by the 1930s, it was considered obsolete and it appears that quantities of this gun were sold as surplus to Haile Selassie's army. The Italians later invaded the country in 1935 and may have captured some O.V.P. guns from the Ethiopians. It was used in small numbers by some Italian units in the Western Desert in 1941, but generally the weapon was phased out by the superior Beretta 38.
