= Märten Metsaviir =

Estonian actor (born 1994)

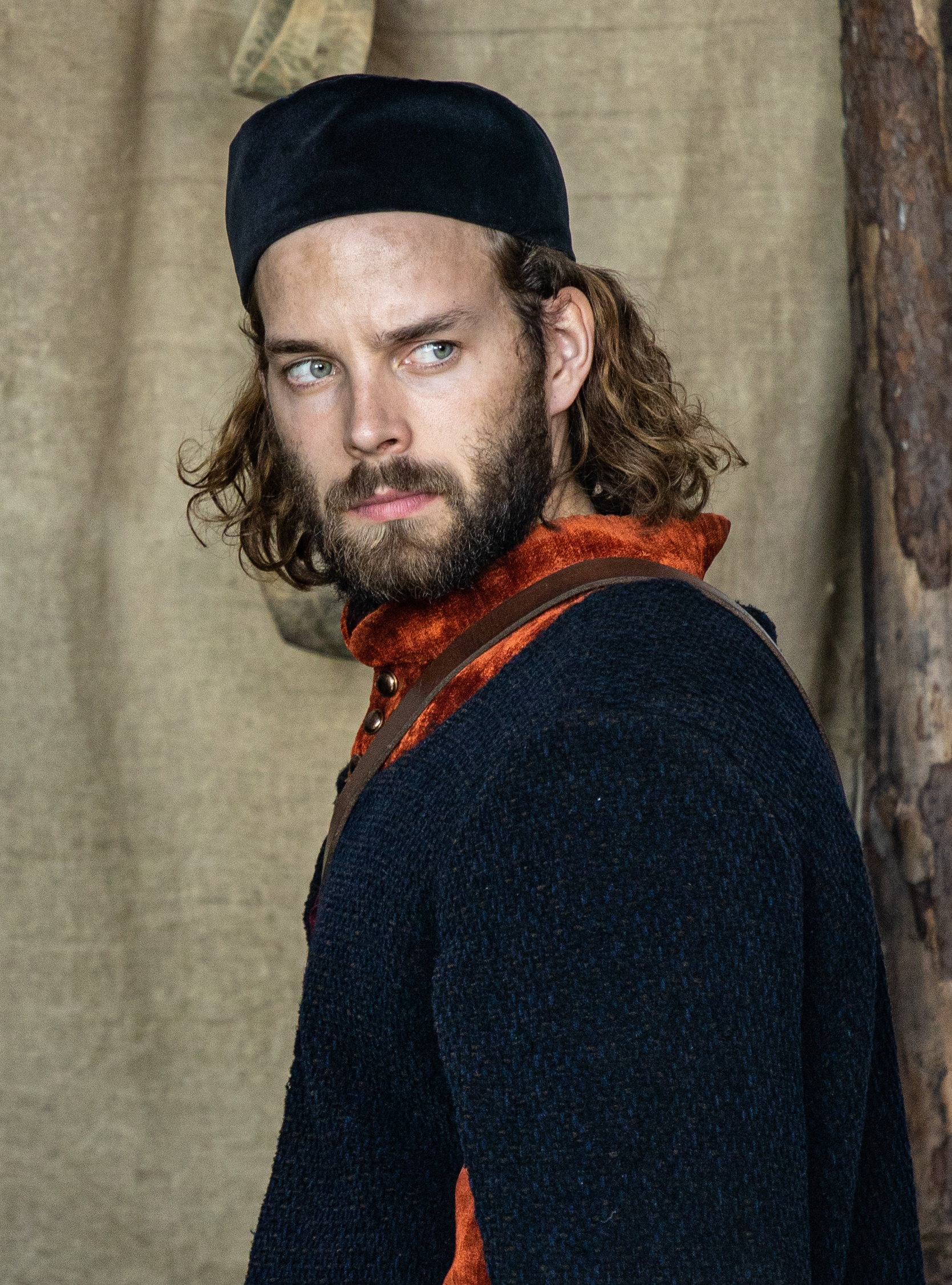
- Metsaviir as the character Melchior Wakenstede in the 2022 film Melchior the Apothecary
- Born: 15 March 1994 (age 31); Tallinn, Estonia
- Occupation: Actor

Märten Metsaviir (born 15 March 1994) is an Estonian actor who came to prominence in 2022 for his starring role as Melchior Wakenstede in the "Melchior" film trilogy based on the series of medieval mystery crime novels by author Indrek Hargla.

== Early life and education ==
Märten Metsaviir was born in Tallinn. His mother, Irja Heinmaa is an accountant. He is a 2013 graduate of Tallinn Secondary School No. 32. In 2016, he enrolled at the drama department of the Estonian Academy of Music and Theatre to study acting under supervisors Elmo Nüganen and Anu Lamp, graduating in 2020. His diploma production roles included Antoine de Saint-Exupéry's The Little Prince and The Doctor in a production of Maxim Gorky's Children of the Sun.

== Career ==
In 2019, while still a student at the Estonian Academy of Music and Theatre, Metsaviir was cast for various minor voice roles in the Janno Põldma and Heiki Ernits directed animated children's film Lotte and the Lost Dragons; part of the popular Lotte literature and film franchise.

In January 2021, Metsaviir began an engagement at the Estonian Drama Theatre in Tallinn. Notable stage roles at the Estonian Drama Theatre include Tomas Egerman in Ingmar Bergman's Private Confessions, Ragnar Solness in Henrik Ibsen's The Master Builder, Dom McGuire in Brian Friel's The Loves of Cass McGuire, and Michael in David Almond's Skellig.

In 2020, while still a drama student, he was cast in the starring role of Melchior Wakenstede (also known as Melchior the Apothecary) in the Elmo Nüganen directed medieval mystery crime feature film Melchior the Apothecary for Taska Film. The film, released in April 2022, was part of a trilogy, based on the popular Apteeker Melchior novels by Estonian author Indrek Hargla. Melchior the Apothecary: The Ghost was released August of the same year, and in April 2023, Melchior the Apothecary: The Executioner's Daughter was released. All three films featured Estonian Academy of Music and Theatre classmate Maarja Johanna Mägi and veteran actor Alo Kõrve.

In 2023, Metsaviir joined the main cast of the long-running TV3 comedy-crime television series Kättemaksukontor in the role of Madis Toor.

Metsaviir has also worked as a voice actor, dubbing foreign language television series into the Estonian language; most notably the Canadian children's series Endlings and the Irish children's drawing tutorial series Draw With Will.

== Personal life ==
Märten Metsaviir resides in Tallinn. He has a daughter. He is an avid kart racing fan and former racer and footballer.
