= Adeele Jaago =

Estonian actress

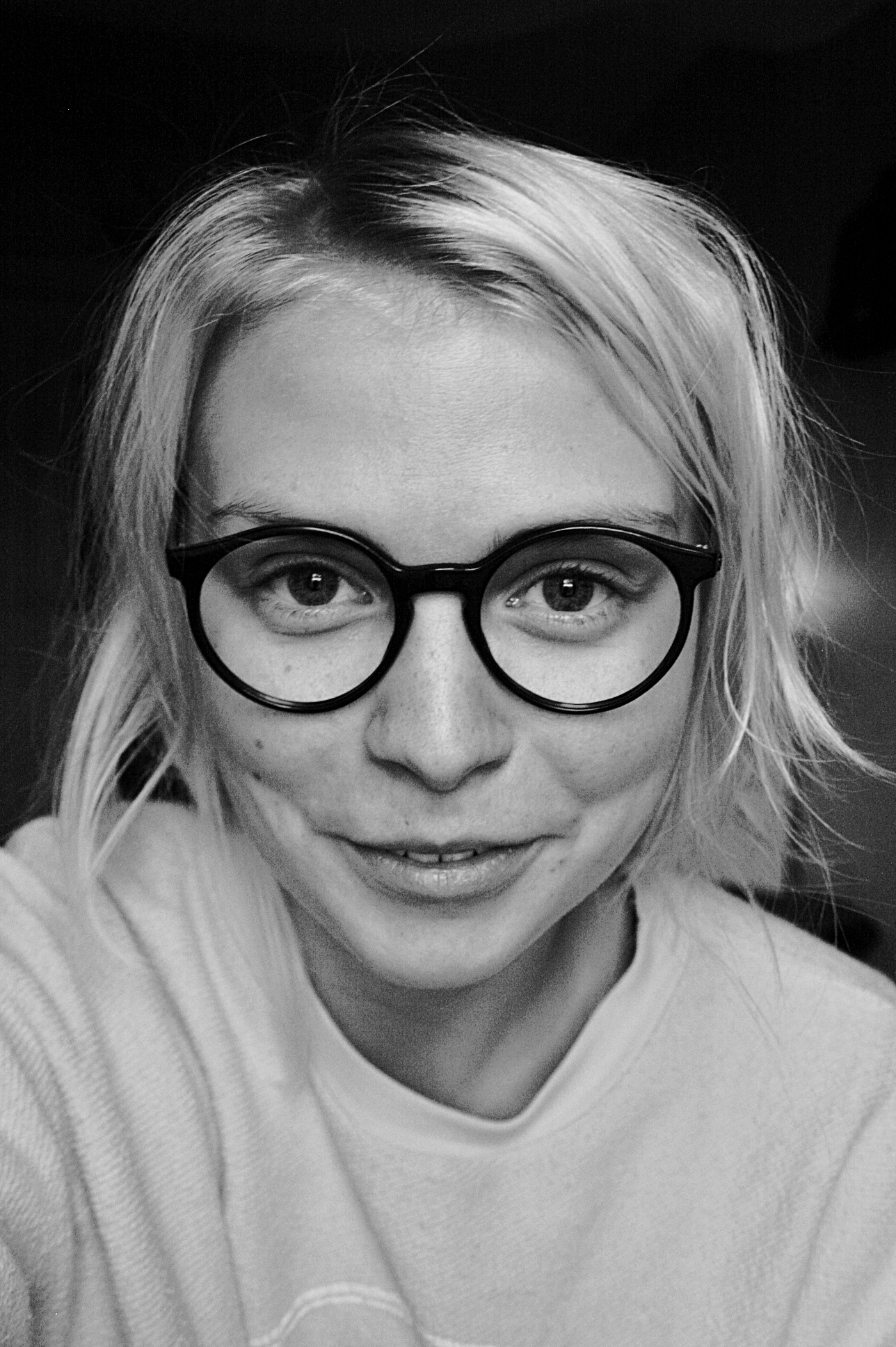
- Born: Adeele Sepp; 10 November 1989 (age 36); Kuressaare, then part of Estonian SSR, Soviet Union
- Occupation: Actress
- Years active: 2011 – present
- Spouse: Jaan Jaago (m. 2019)
- Children: 1

Adeele Jaago (until 2019, Adeele Sepp; born 10 November 1989) is an Estonian stage, film, and television actress.

== Early life and education ==
Adeele Jaago was born as Adeele Sepp in Kuressaare, on the island of Saaremaa in 1989. Her parents divorced when she was twelve. She attended schools in Valga County, graduating from secondary school at Tõrva Gymnasium in Tõrva in 2008. From 2008 until 2009, she studied semiotics at the University of Tartu before enrolling at the University of Tartu Viljandi Culture Academy to study drama, graduating cum laude in 2013.

== Career ==
=== Stage ===
In 2013, shortly after graduation, Adeele Sepp began an engagement as an actress at the Ugala theatre in Viljandi, where she is still currently employed. She made her stage debut at the theatre while still a student in a production of Viktor Pelevin's 1993 allegorical story The Yellow Arrow in 2011. Since joining the Ugala, Sepp has appeared in roles in productions of such varied international authors and playwrights as: George Stiles, Fyodor Dostoyevsky, Abi Morgan, Carlo Goldoni, Rainer Werner Fassbinder, Ken Ludwig, and L. Frank Baum, among others. Roles at the Ugala in works by Estonian authors and playwrights include those of: Tõnu Õnnepalu, Martin Algus, Oskar Luts, and A. H. Tammsaare.

Sepp has also appeared in productions at the Teatri Kodu, the Vanemuine theatre, and the MTÜ Tuulekell.

=== Film ===
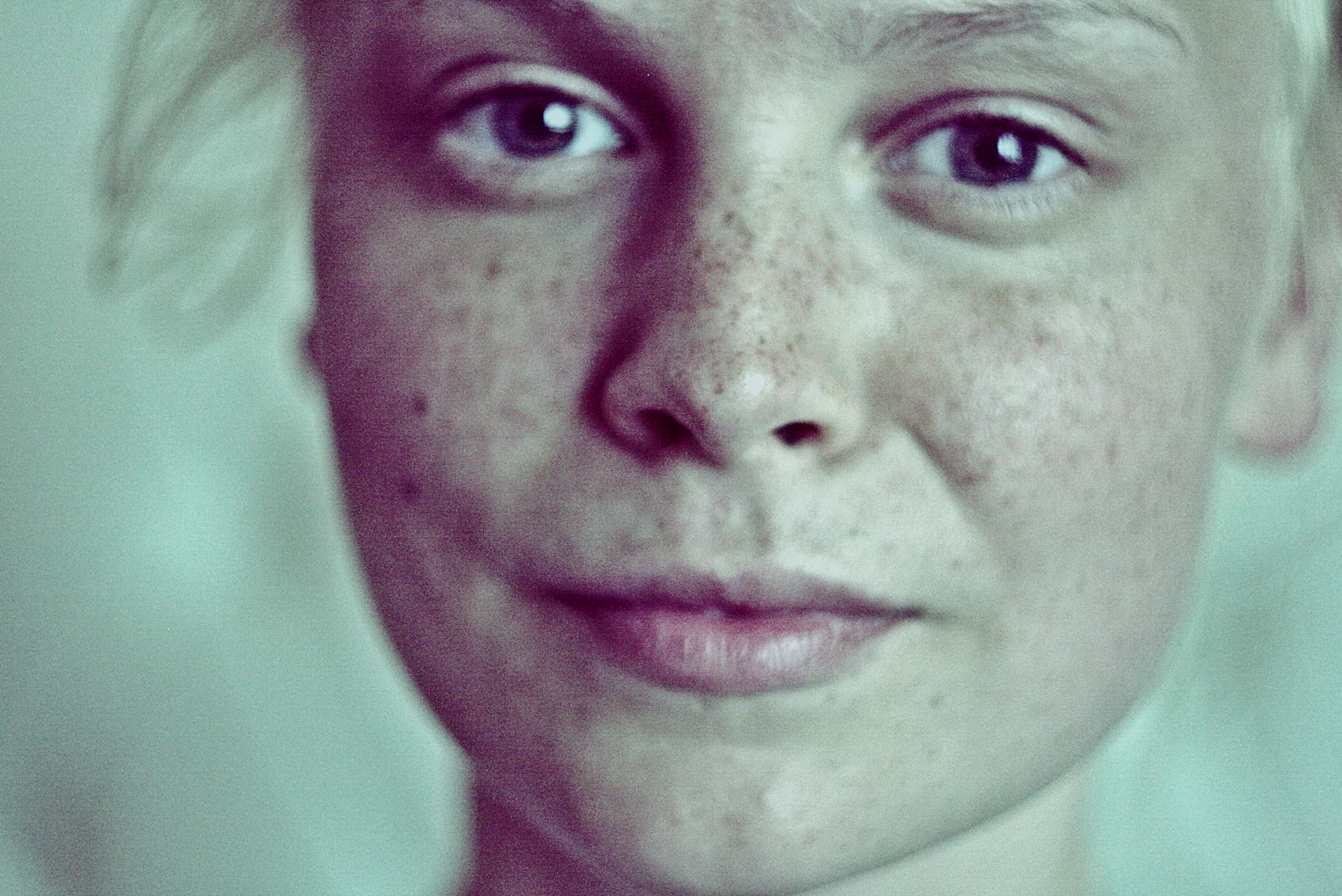
Portrait of Adeele (Sepp) Jaago in 2012.

In 2010, Sepp made her feature film debut in a starring role as Elen in the Richard Meitern and Martin Liira directed student film musical-romance Tudengimuusikal about a teenager who moves from her father's home in Tallinn to the student dormitories in Tartu to study economics at university. The film revolves around Elen's newfound liberation from her father, new friendships, and the attentions of two very different young men. The film is interspersed with musical and dance numbers. Tudengimuusikal would be Estonia's most expensive student film. In 2018, she appeared in a supporting role as Katrin in the Liina Triškina-Vanhatalo-directed drama Võta või jäta for Allfilm.

=== Television ===
Sepp made her television debut as Saara on an episode of the Kanal 2 crime series Kelgukoerad in 2010. She is possibly best recalled, however, as the character Kirke Klein on the popular TV3 comedy-crime series Kättemaksukontor; a role she played from 2013 until 2015.

In 2016, Sepp was a contestant on TV3's Su nägu kõlab tuttavalt, the Estonian version of Your Face Sounds Familiar, an interactive reality television franchise series where celebrity contestants impersonate singers. Sepp's impersonations included Renārs Kaupers of Brainstorm, Brigitte Bardot, the Spice Girls, David Bowie, Jennifer Hudson, and Anne Veski, among others. She finished in third place at series end.

== Personal life ==
Adeele Jaago currently resides in Viljandi while she is engaged at the Ugala theatre. She frequently commutes to Tallinn for other work.

On 3 August 2019, Sepp married Jaan Jaago, guitarist and vocalist of the Estonian folk band Curly Strings. The couple have a daughter, Salmeli, born in October 2018.
