= Vallo Kirs =

Estonian actor

- Born: 23 November 1987 (age 38); Rakvere, then part of Estonian SSR, Soviet Union
- Occupations: Actor, theatre director
- Years active: 2004-present
- Partners: Klaudia Tiitsmaa
- Children: 2

Vallo Kirs (born 23 November 1987) is an Estonian stage, film, and television actor and stage director whose career began as a teenager in 2004. Kirs is possibly best recalled internationally for his role as Kaspar in the 2007 Ilmar Raag-directed feature film drama Klass.

== Early life and education ==
Vallo Kirs was born in 1987 in the town of Rakvere in Lääne-Viru County, where he attended primary and secondary school at the Rakvere Gymnasium. After graduation, he studied history at the University of Tartu's Faculty of Philosophy. In 2009, Kirs left his studies at the University of Tartu to study acting and directing at the University of Tartu Viljandi Culture Academy, graduating in 2013.

== Career ==
=== Film ===
Kirs began his career at ages sixteen and seventeen appearing as an uncredited extra in crowd scenes in two Estonian feature films in 2004 and 2005: Sigade revolutsioon and Malev. This was followed by the role of Ott in the popular 2006 Rasmus Merivoo-directed comedy short film Tulnukas ehk Valdise pääsemine 11 osas opposite actors Mart Avandi, Ott Sepp, Uku Uusberg, and Merle Jääger.

Kirs' most prominent film role to date was a starring role as Kaspar in director Ilmar Raag's gritty 2007 feature film Klass for Estonian Culture Film. The film focused on rampant bullying which leads two teens (played by Kirs and actor Pärt Uusberg) to plan and commit a school shooting. Klass received awards from the Karlovy Vary International Film Festival and the Warsaw International Film Festival and was the official Estonian submission for the Best Foreign Language Film Category of the 80th Academy Awards, although it was not nominated.

In 2023, Kirs appeared in the role of Kaltsakas Vallo in the Ain Mäeots directed historical feature film comedy Kuulsuse narrid, based on the 1892 story of the same name by Eduard Bornhöhe.

In 2024, he reprised his role of Ott in Tulnukas 2 ehk Valdise tagasitulek 17 osas, directed by Rasmus Merivoo, which is a feature-length sequel to Tulnukas ehk Valdise pääsemine 11 osas.

Kirs has also appeared in several student films and short films.

=== Television ===
In 2010, Vallo Kirs reprised his role of Kaspar from Klass for Klass: elu pärast, a seven-part television miniseries that appeared on Estonia's ETV2 and followed up on the aftermath of the school shooting. Kirs has since appeared in roles on the Kanal 2 crime series Kelgukoerad in 2010, the TV3 comedy series Ment in 2012, and the TV3 comedy-crime series Kättemaksukontor in 2017. In 2017, he began appearing as Albert in the Eesti Televisioon (ETV) children's television series Lotte lood, based on the popular Estonian Lotte franchise.

=== Theatre ===
While enrolled at the University of Tartu Viljandi Culture Academy, Kirs began performing as an actor on stage, mostly at the Ugala theatre in Viljandi. After graduation, he became engaged at the Ugala as a stage actor and director, where he still currently works. As an actor, he has appeared in productions of works by such authors, playwrights and lyricists as Viktor Pelevin, Anthony Drewe and George Stiles, Tõnu Õnnepalu, Carlo Goldoni, Tom Stoppard, Gianni Rodari, and Martin Algus. As a director, he has overseen and orchestrated the mounting of a theatre productions of works by Mati Unt, Thorbjørn Egner, André Gide, Fyodor Dostoyevsky, A. H. Tammsaare, Carlo Goldoni, John Steinbeck, Urmas Lennuk, and others.

Kirs has also performed in and directed productions at the Tallinna Linnateater, the Rakvere Theatre, and several smaller venues throughout Estonia.

== Personal life ==
Vallo Kirs currently resides in Viljandi, while engaged at the Ugala theatre. He is in a romantic relationship with actress Klaudia Tiitsmaa. On 9 September 2018, Tiitsmaa gave birth to their first child, a son, named Vallo Kirs Jr. In October 2020, Tiitsmaa gave birth to the couple's second son, Villu.

Kirs is an avid football fan and played as a defender for Suure-Jaani United and Põhja-Sakala football clubs.
