= Klaudia Tiitsmaa =

Estonian actress (born 1990)

- Born: 9 September 1990 (age 36); Tallinn, then part of Estonian SSR, Soviet Union
- Occupation: Actress
- Years active: 2012-present
- Partners: Vallo Kirs
- Children: 2

Klaudia Tiitsmaa (born 9 September 1990) is an Estonian stage, television and film actress.

== Early life and education ==
Klaudia Tiitsmaa was born in Tallinn to artist Margus "Sorge" Tiitsmaa and doll and puppet maker Resa Tiitsmaa. She grew up mainly in Türi in Järva County, where she graduated from secondary school at Türi Gymnasium in 2009. She is a 2013 graduate of University of Tartu Viljandi Culture Academy, majoring in acting.

== Stage career ==
In 2013, shortly after graduation, she joined the Ugala theatre in Viljandi. She made her stage debut at the theatre as a student in a 2010 production of the Astrid Lindgren children's book Karlsson-on-the-Roof. She debuted at the Ugala as an actress engaged at the theatre in the role of Katja in a 2013 production of Tõnu Õnnepalu's Sajand.

Tiitsmaa has appeared in roles one the Ugala stage in productions of works by such varies authors and playwrights as: Fyodor Dostoyevsky, A. H. Tammsaare, George Stiles, Carlo Goldoni, Mati Unt, Rainer Werner Fassbinder, Oskar Luts, David Mamet, and L. Frank Baum, among others. In 2015, Tiitsmaa received both the Ugala theatre's Best Actress and the audience's choice for Best Actress award.

== Television and film career ==
Tiitsmaa made her television debut in 2010 in two appearances on the Kanal 2 crime-drama series Kelgukoerad. She has also appeared on the popular TV3 comedy-crime series Kättemaksukontor in 2013 and joining the cast as the character Kioko Veega from 2017 until 2018, and as Ingel in 2015 on the TV3 drama series Üheotsapilet. Between 2010 and 2012, she appeared in several roles on the Kanal 2 drama series Saladused.

In 2016, Klaudia Tiitsmaa made her feature-length film debut in the Triin Ruumet directed tragicomedy The Days That Confused for Kinosaurus Film. The film stars Hendrik Toompere Jr. Jr. as a young, disaffected man from rural Estonia on a frantic journey through midsummer Estonia in the late 1990s trying to discover purpose and meaning in his life; and Tiitsmaa as Maria, a young, wealthy, law student from Tallinn holidaying in the region when their paths cross. Tiitsmaa has also appeared in a number of film shorts. In 2020, she appeared in the Andrejs Ekis and Tanel Ingi directed comedy film Asjad, millest me ei räägi.

== Personal life ==
Klaudia Tiitsmaa currently resides in Viljandi. She is in a relationship with actor Vallo Kirs. On 9 September 2018 (Tiitsmaa's birthday), she gave birth to their first child, a son, named Vallo Kirs Jr. In October 2020, Tiitsmaa gave birth to the couple's second son, Villu.
