= Alo Kõrve =

Estonian theater, film, and television actor

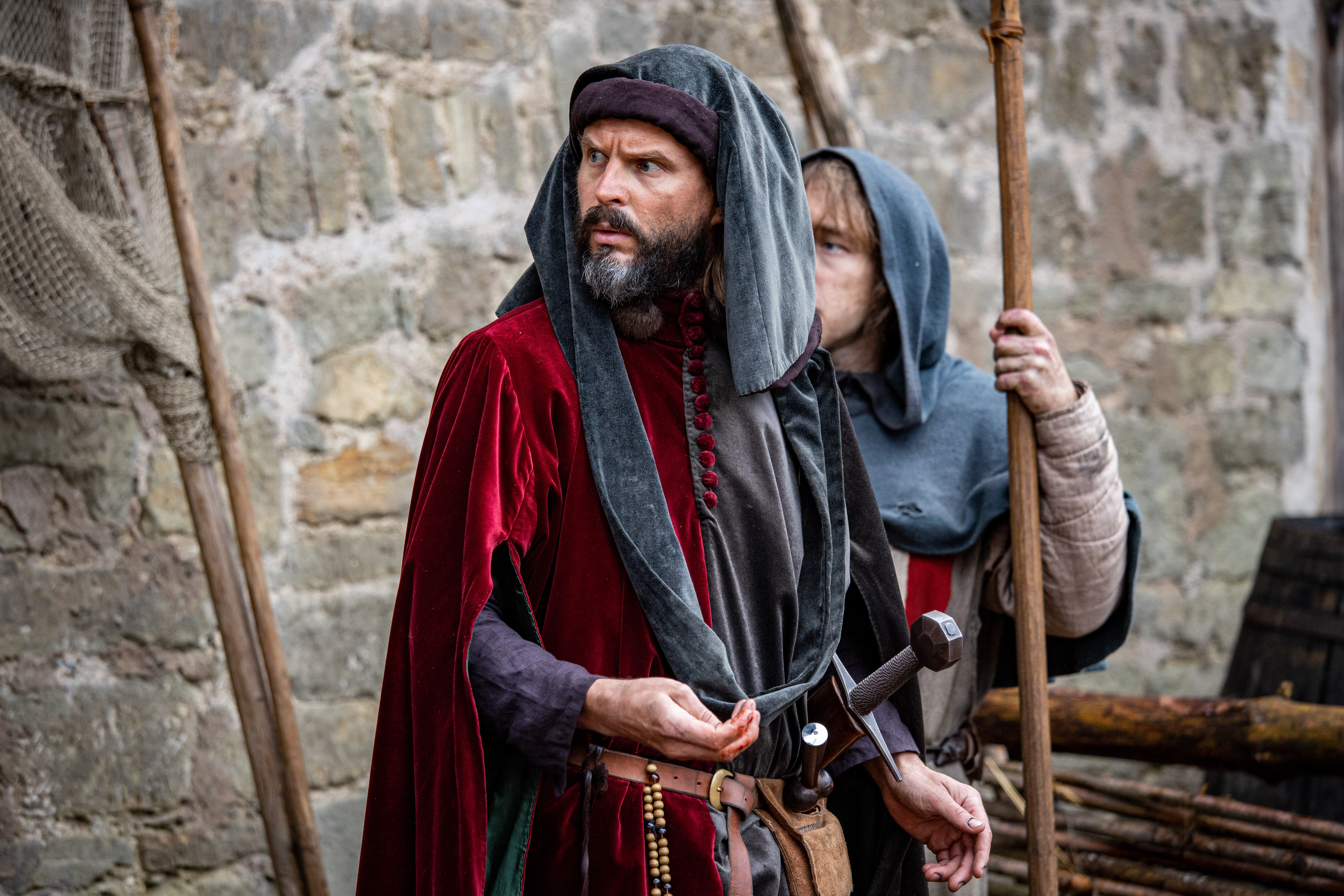
- Alo Kõrve as Wentzel Dorn in the 2022 film Melchior the Apothecary
- Born: 2 December 1978 (age 47); Jõgeva, then part of Estonian SSR, Soviet Union
- Occupation: Actor
- Years active: 2001 – present
- Spouse: Hele Kõre (2009 – present)
- Children: 2

Alo Kõrve (born 2 December 1978) is an Estonian stage, film, and television actor.

== Early life and education ==
Alo Kõrve was born in Jõgeva, Jõgeva County to Are Kõrve and his wife (née Simson). He is the youngest of two siblings; his older sister Ave Kõrve-Noorkõiv was born in 1975. After graduating from secondary school Kõrve initially planned to study law, however, he subsequently enrolled in the dramatic arts department of the EMA Higher Drama School (now, the Estonian Academy of Music and Theatre) in Tallinn, graduating in 2002. Among his diploma production roles were: Brian in Mark Twain's The Prince and the Pauper (2000), Basilio the Cat in Aleksey Nikolayevich Tolstoy's Buratino (2000), Doctor Vaik and Advocate Kurg in Eduard Vilde's The Elusive Miracle (2001), and Timo, in Aleksis Kivi's Seven Brothers (2001).

== Career ==
=== Stage ===
Since 2002, Alo Kõrve has been engaged as an actor at the Tallinn City Theatre. During his years at the Tallinn City Theatre, he has performed in a large variety of stage productions by such international playwrights and authors as: Shakespeare, Alexandre Dumas, W. B. Yeats, Martin McDonagh, David Storey, Victor Pelevin, Evelyn Waugh, Carlo Gozzi, Sławomir Mrożek, Tennessee Williams, J. B. Priestley, Tom Stoppard, Ferenc Molnár, Otfried Preußler, Ann Jellicoe, and John Steinbeck, among others. Among his more memorable performances at the Tallinn City Theatre in roles by Estonian playwrights and authors include those of: A. H. Tammsaare, Paavo Piik, Jaanus Rohumaa, and Triin Sinissaar.

In addition to his performances at the Tallinn City Theatre, Kõrve has also appeared in roles in a number of productions at other theatres throughout Estonia, including: the Estonian Drama Theatre, the VAT Theatre, the R.A.A.A.M. Theatre, the MTÜ Look theatre, and the Varius Theatre in Tallinn, among others.

=== Film ===
Alo Kõrve's first substantial film role was the character Käsper in the 2002 Elmo Nüganen directed period feature film war drama Nimed marmortahvlil. The film was adapted from the 1936 novel of the same name by Albert Kivikas, which chronicles the lives of several Estonian students during the 1918–1920 Estonian War of Independence. The film also starred Kõrve's future wife, actress Hele Kõre. Nimed marmortahvlil was the highest budgeted Estonian feature film and the most successful film in Estonia in terms of box office profits. This was followed by appearances in several film shorts, including the 2007 Anu Aun directed Indigo Room opposite actress Mirtel Pohla, and the 2014 Margus Paju directed Kaastundeavaldus, opposite actors Tiit Lilleorg and Pääru Oja.

In 2009, Alo Kõrve was among several narrators of the documentary Disko ja tuumasõda (Disco and Atomic War), directed by Jaak Kilmi, which lightheartedly chronicles how Western pop culture of the 1970s and 1980s infiltrated the Estonian Soviet Socialist Republic through Finnish television broadcasts trickling into northern Estonia and the Soviet regime's attempt to halt it. That same year, he appeared as Rebane (Fox) in the Rasmus Merivoo directed musical comedy feature film Buratino. In 2016, he appeared as Heiki in the Valentin Kuik and Manfred Vainokivi-directed drama Perekonnavaled.

In 2020, he appeared alongside his wife as the character Paul Parik in the Margus Paju directed World War II spy drama O2. In 2021, he appeared as Anton in the Priit Pääsuke directed comedy-drama Öölapsed. In 2022, he appeared as the character Wentzel Dorn in the Elmo Nüganen directed historical thriller-mystery trilogy films Melchior the Apothecary, Apteeker Melchior. Viirastus, and Apteeker Melchior. Timuka tütar for Taska Film, based on the novel series by Indrek Hargla.

=== Television ===
Alo Kõrve has made frequent appearances on Estonian television, beginning with a small role as Mario in an episode of the Eesti Televisioon (ETV) crime-drama series Ohtlik lend in 2006. He has made other appearances on such television series as the TV3 drama Helena, the popular TV3 comedy-crime series Kättemaksukontor, the Kanal 2 crime-drama series Viimane võmm, and the ETV drama Mustad lesed. Kõrve is possibly best recalled, however, for his recurring role as Sven Uudas on the Kanal 2 drama series Restart, beginning in 2015.

== Personal life ==
Alo Kõrve married the actress and singer Hele Kõre in June 2009. They have two daughters; Roosi, born in 2009 and Kirsi, born in 2012. The family reside in Üksnurme, Harju County, near Tallinn.
