= Leino Rei =

Estonian actor and theatre director

Leino Rei (born 18 March 1972) is an Estonian actor and theatre director.

== Selected filmography ==
- 2002 Ferdinand (feature film; role; Dumb man)
- 2004 Bussi juures (documentary feature film; role: Narrator)
- 2006-2007 Ohtlik lend (television series; role: Marek)
- 2010 Riigimehed (television series; role: Doctor)
- 2010-2014 Õnne 13 (television series; role: Vaapo Väluste)
- 2012-2016 Kättemaksukontor (television series; role: various)
- 2013 Väikelinna detektiivid ja Valge Daami saladus (feature film; role: Mait Maidla)
- 2014 Väikelinna detektiivid (television series; role: Mait Maidla)
- 2016 Klassikokkutulek (feature film; role: Roland)
- 2017 Lotte lood (television series; role: Rabbit Wolfgang)
- 2018 Lõks (television series; role: Tauno, Taavi)
- 2018 Tuliliilia (feature film; role: Inspector (Estonian: uurija))
