= Mart Müürisepp =

Estonian actor

- Born: 28 October 1991 (age 34); Tallinn, Estonia
- Occupation: Actor
- Years active: 2009 – present

Mart Müürisepp (born 28 October 1991) is an Estonian stage, film, and television actor.

== Early life and education ==
Mart Müürisepp was born and raised in Tallinn. He attended secondary school at the Jakob Westholm Gymnasium, graduating in 2011.

== Acting career ==
In 2008, while still attending classes in the 10th grade at the Jakob Westholm Gymnasium, Müürisepp was approached to appear in the starring role of Tom in the Hannu Salonen directed crime-drama feature film Vasha, about a naïve sixteen-year-old schoolboy who finds himself to be an unwitting accomplice in a deadly game of vengeance after befriending Artur (played by Mehmet Kurtuluş), a Chechen man who is eager to avenge the murder of his family. After filming was completed, Müürisepp returned to Jakob Westholm Gymnasium to finish his secondary education as well as studying acting and puppetry from 2009 until 2011 at the Estonian Puppet and Youth Theatre (NUKU) in Tallinn.

In 2011, shortly after graduation, Müürisepp was offered an engagement as a stage actor at the NUKU, which he accepted. He is still currently employed at the theatre. Some of his most memorable roles since joining the NUKU include those in stage productions by such varied international playwrights and authors as: Victor Hugo, Franz Kafka, Astrid Lindgren, Mati Unt, and Oscar Wilde, among others.

Also, in 2011, Müürisepp began appearing on the TV3 television drama series Päikese poole in the role of Tom. The series starred singer Getter Jaani and ended production in 2012. Müürisepp also had a small role on the TV3 comedy series Unistuste agentuur in 2011.

In 2012, Müürisepp appeared as Risto in the Andres Kõpper and Arun Tamm directed dark-comedy feature film Vasaku jala reede for Tallinn Skyline Productions. The film chronicles eight groups of different people who cross paths in the space of twenty-four hours due to some very bad decisions.

In 2014, he was a contestant and ultimate winner on TV3's Su nägu kõlab tuttavalt, the Estonian version of Your Face Sounds Familiar, an interactive reality television franchise series where celebrity contestants impersonate singers. Müürisepp's impersonations included Antonio Banderas, Nancy Sinatra, Rolf Roosalu, Shaggy, James Hetfield of Metallica, Tina Turner, and Jaak Joala, among others. In 2016, he appeared on the second season of the Kanal 2 series Suur Komöödiaõhtu, in which several Estonian celebrities compete in a variety of weekly comedic challenges.

Also in 2016, Müürisepp played the role of Ken-Priidik in the René Vilbre directed comedy feature film Klassikokkutulek, for Taska Film. Klassikokkutulek follows three middle-aged men (played by Mait Malmsten, G-Enka aka Henry Kõrvits, and Ago Anderson) who decide to attend their twenty-fifth high school reunion. In 2019, he appeared in the Mart Sander directed fantasy-horror film Kõhedad muinaslood. In 2021, he followed with the role of Markus in the Priit Pääsuke directed comedy-drama Öölapsed.

== Personal life ==
Mart Müürisepp currently resides in Tallinn. He has previously been romantically linked to actress Kaisa Selde.
