= Kristjan Lüüs =

Estonian actor (born 1991)

- Born: 17 March 1991 (age 35); Tartu, Estonia
- Occupation: Actor
- Years active: 2009–present
- Spouse: Maris Nõlvak (m. 2016; div. 2020)

Kristjan Lüüs (born 17 March 1991) is an Estonian stage, film and television actor whose career began in the 2010s.

== Early life and education ==
Kristjan Lüüs was born and raised in Tartu. He is a 2010 graduate of the Tartu Art Gymnasium secondary school (now, Tartu Variku School). In 2011, he enrolled in the Theatre Arts Department of the University of Tartu Viljandi Culture Academy in Viljandi to study acting, graduating in 2015. His diploma roles were in productions of Jaanika Tammaru's Pööriöö, Ivar Põllu's 1987, Birgit Landberg's Ada ja Evald, and William Shakespeare's Romeo and Juliet.

== Career ==
=== Stage ===
In 2014, before graduating from the University of Tartu Viljandi Culture Academy, Lüüs joined the Must Kast (Black Box) theatre in Tartu, where he is still currently engaged. He has performed in productions by Daniil Kharms, Albert Camus, Birgit Landberg, Rudyard Kipling, and Kaija M. Kalvet. He has also performed onstage at the Estonian Drama Theatre, R.A.A.A.M. theatre, Ugala, Tartu New Theatre, and Endla Theatre, as well as a number of smaller theatres throughout Estonia.

=== Television ===
Since 2013, Lüüs has appeared in several Estonian television roles. In 2014, he appeared in several roles on the Eesti Televisioon (ETV) sketch-comedy series Tujurikkuja and the following year appeared in various character roles on the Kanal 2 comedy series Takso, as Aaron on the TV3 drama series Krista lood, and Ekke in an episode of the ETV drama series Mustad lesed. In 2016, he appeared on the Kanal 2 comedy series Heeringas Veenuse õlal and in 2017 played the role of Sander Pronks in the long-running TV3 comedy-crime series Kättemaksukontor. Lüüs' most prominent television roles were as the character Mauno Mesine in the TV3 military drama series Vabad mehed, a role he played from 2014 until 2017, as Arno Sark on the Kanal 2 crime series Siberi võmm, joining the cast in 2016, and as Bert in the TV3 comedy series Padjaklubi from 2018 until 2019.

=== Film ===
In 2009, while still attending secondary school, Kristjan Lüüs was cast to play the role of Andres in the Richard Meitern and Martin Liira-directed romantic musical film Tudengimuusikal. In 2016, he appeared in a small role in the René Vilbre-directed comedy Klassikokkutulek and the same year as Andres in the frenetic Triin Ruumet-directed youth-tragicomedy Päevad, mis ajasid segadusse. In 2017, he had a supporting role as a hick in the Jaak Kilmi-directed historical comedy Sangarid and a small role in the Antti-Jussi Annila-directed Finnish historical drama Ikitie. In 2018, played the role of Marko in the Liina Trishkina-Vanhatalo-directed Allfilm drama feature film Võta või jäta. The film was the official Estonian submission to the 91st Academy Awards for Best Foreign Language Film but was not selected. In 2021, he appeared as Robert in the Priit Pääsuke-directed comedy Öölapsed, and the following year in the third installment of the Elmo Nüganen directed trilogy Apteeker Melchior. Timuka tütar for Taska Film, based on the novel series by Indrek Hargla.

== Personal life ==
Kristjan Lüüs wed actress Maris Nõlvak in July 2016. The marriage ended in divorce in 2020. Lüüs currently reside in Tartu.
