= Kadri Rämmeld =

Estonian actress

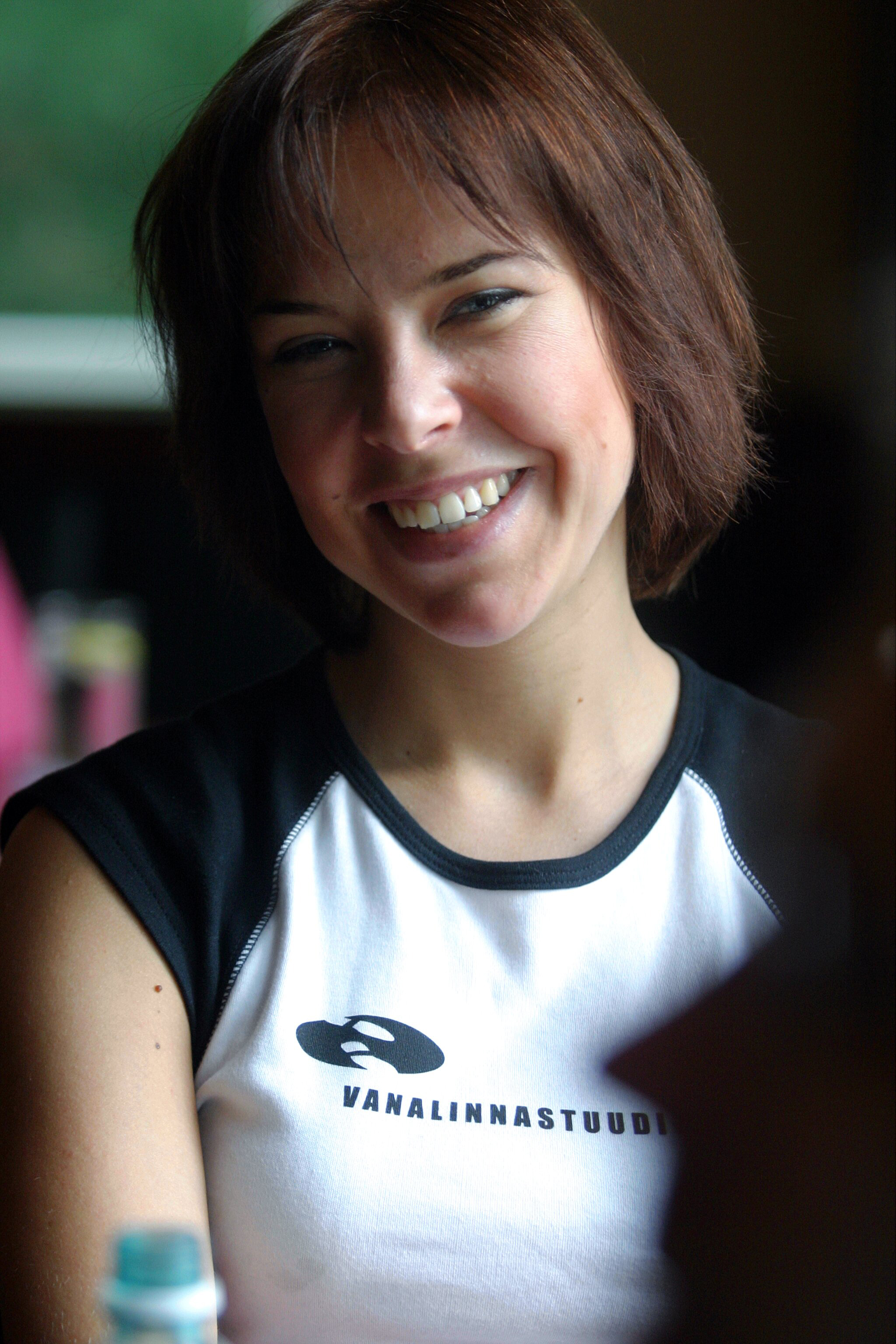
- Born: Kadri Adamson; 16 August 1976 (age 49); Tallinn, then part of Estonian SSR, Soviet Union
- Occupation: Actress
- Years active: 1998 – present
- Spouse: Meelis Rämmeld (m. 2016)
- Children: 3

Kadri Rämmeld (until 2016, Kadri Adamson; born 16 August 1976) is an Estonian stage, film, and television actress.

== Early life and education ==
Kadri Rämmeld was born Kadri Adamson in Tallinn in 1976. She attended both primary and secondary schools in Tallinn, graduating from the Mustamäe German Gymnasium (Tallinna 54. Keskkool). Afterward, she majored in German studies at the Estonian Institute of Humanities (now part of Tallinn University) and graduated in 1999 from the institute's drama and theatre department.

== Career ==
=== Stage ===
Following graduation, Rämmeld was engaged at a number of theatres and worked as a freelance actress, including the Theatrum SA, the Vanalinnastuudio, and Old Baskin's Theatre; all in Tallinn. Since 2014, she has been engaged as an actress at the Endla Theatre in Pärnu. Some of her earlier roles at the Endla include Bella Manningham in a production of Patrick Hamilton's Gaslight, and Alberta in the Bettina Hamel, Tobias Krechel, et al. penned play Titanic – Beautiful People Act Out Great Feelings. In 2016, 2019, 2021 and 2023, she was voted the Endla Theatre audience favorite.

=== Film ===
Rämmeld made her film debut in the gritty 2007 Dirk Hoyer directed crime-drama Võõras, in which she appeared as the main character TP's (played by Tanel Padar) sister. In 2006, she appeared in the film Tabamata ime; a collection of six short films adapted from the 1912 play of the same name by author Eduard Vilde.

In 2016, she played the role of Anne in the René Vilbre directed comedy film Klassikokkutulek, which follows three middle-aged men (played by Mait Malmsten, Henry Kõrvits aka Genka, and Ago Anderson), who decide to attend their twenty-fifth high school reunion. In 2019, she again played the role of Anne in the third installment, Klassikokkutulek 3: Ristiisad. In 2018, she appeared in the role of Aunt Iida in the Moonika Siimets directed period drama Seltsimees laps, and in 2019 appeared in the role of Milady in the Mart Sander directed fantasy-horror film Kõhedad muinaslood.

Rämmeld has also worked as a voice actress; in 1998, she provided a number of character voices in the animated Peep Pedmanson directed short film Just märried for Nukufilm.

=== Television and radio ===
Rämmeld is possibly most recognized for her roles in a number of popular Estonian television series, beginning with the role of Liis Uuspere in the ETV drama series Kodu keset linna in 2003, in which she was an original cast member. She would leave the series in 2006, but reprise her role again in 2009, and again in 2012.

Between 2006 and 2008, she played the character Laura (aka Brita) in the Kanal 2 crime-drama series Kelgukoerad. Rämmeld's most popular role is arguably that of Marion Pärn in the TV3 comedy-crime series Kättemaksukontor, in which she has been a main cast member since the series was first broadcast in 2009. Other television appearances include the TV3 parody series Edekabel in 2004, and the Kanal 2 game show Kis? Mis? Kus? in 2008.

Apart from her stage, film, and television career, Rämmeld has performed in a number of radio plays.

== Personal life ==
Kadri Adamson was in a long-term relationship with businessman Toomas Vara. The couple had two children; a daughter, Miira, born 18 February 2006; and a son, Voldemar, born 7 November 2007. In October 2014 the couple announced they had separated.

In early summer 2016, Adamson married actor Meelis Rämmeld. In January 2017, the couple announced they were expecting a daughter. Following her marriage, Adamson began using the surname of her husband, Rämmeld, in both her personal and professional life.
