= Eeva Talsi =

Estonian folk musician (born 1988)

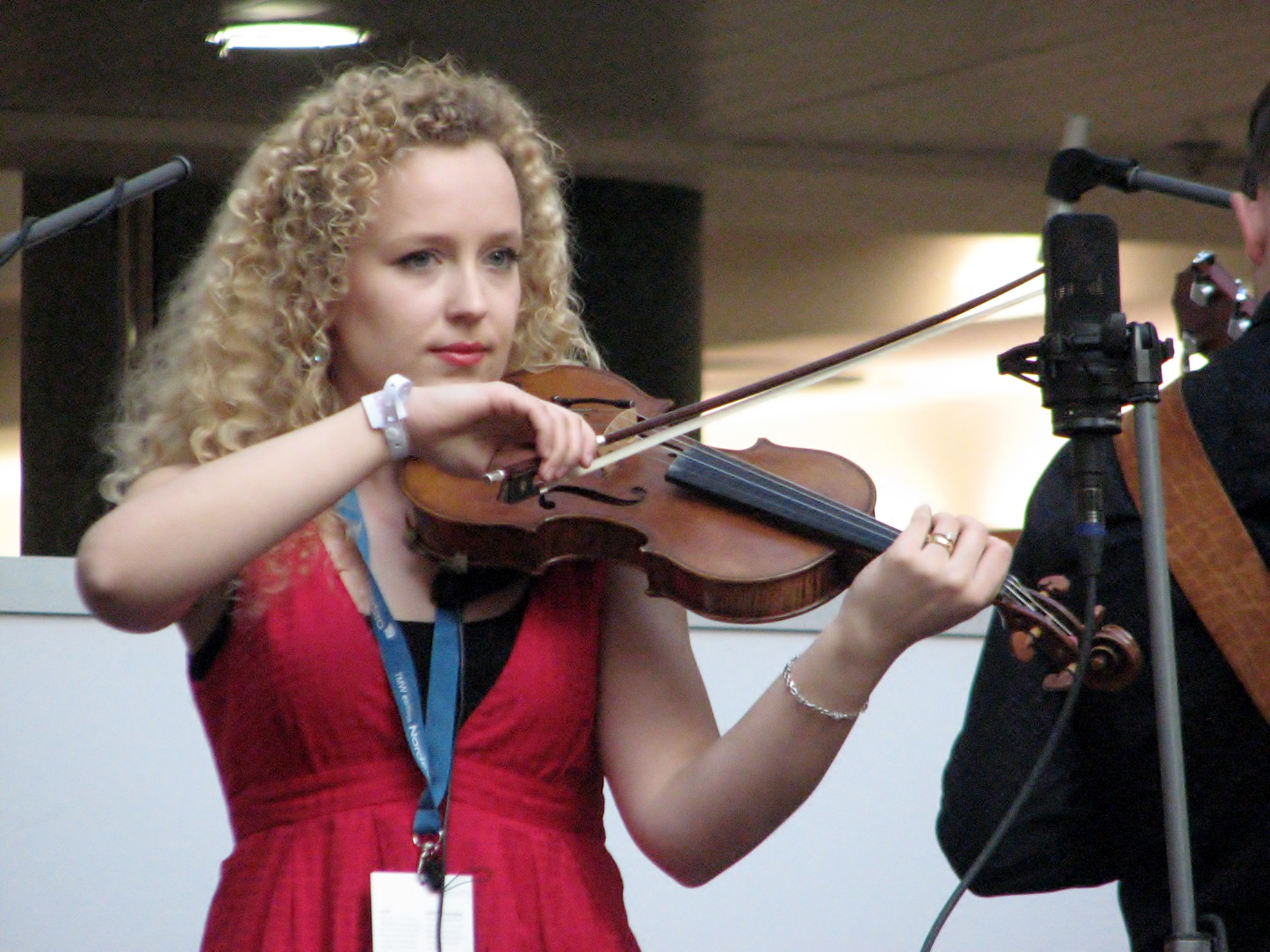
- Talsi performing with Curly Strings at Tallinn Music Week in 2014

Background information
- Born: Eeva Lindal; 17 December 1988 (age 37); Tartu
- Genres: Folk
- Instruments: Violin, vocals
- Member of: Curly Strings; Torupilli Jussi Trio

Eeva Talsi (née Lindal, born 17 December 1988) is an Estonian folk musician, violinist and singer. She is a member of the band Curly Strings.

== Biography ==
Talsi was born on 17 December 1988 in Tartu, and grew up in Ülenurme. She began playing the violin as a child, aged 3. She was educated in classical music at Ülenurme Music School (Estonian: Ülenurme Muusikakool) [et].

After leaving school, Talsi studied at the University of Tartu Viljandi Culture Academy (Estonian: Tartu Ülikooli Viljandi kultuuriakadeemia), graduating in 2011. She took part in a student exchange programme to the University of Gothenburg in Sweden.

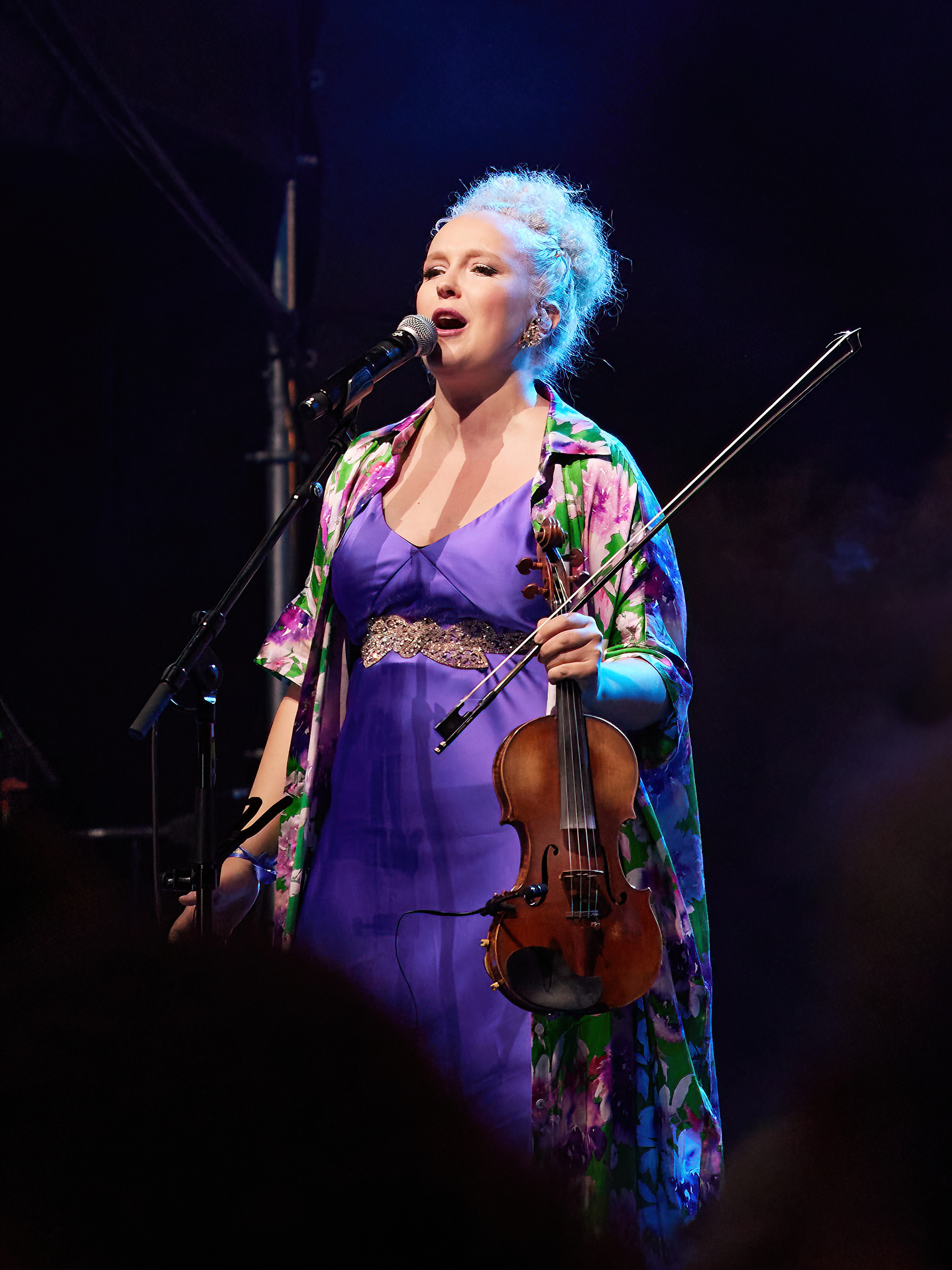
Talsi performing in 2023

Talsi is a member of the Estonian folk band Curly Strings, which was established in 2013. In 2015, Curly Strings won in four categories at the Estonian Music Awards, winning Best Album, Best Band, Best Debut Album and Best Song for their track In a distant village (Estonian: Kauges kolas). In 2016, the band were named "European Bluegrass Band 2016" at the European World of Bluegrass festival in Voorthuizen, The Netherlands. Talsi is also a member of the Torupilli Jussi Trio [et].

Talsi is also a songwriter and is the head of the traditional music department at the Heino Eller Tartu Music College (Estonian: Heino Elleri Muusikakool). She gives lessons on old violin songs and their dance steps.

Alongside her music career, in 2024 Talsi collaborated with the brand GIVEN on a silver jewellery collection which was inspired by an Estonian creation song. The collection was called LEND / FLIGHT and raised money for the Tartu University Clinic Children's Fund.

== Personal life ==
She married Estonian folk musician, mandolin player and fellow member of Curly Strings, Villu Talsi [et] in 2011. They have two children together. She was featured on the front cover of parenting company Ajakiri EMA's magazine in 2020.

Talsi's grandfather Aksel Herbert Lindal managed to avoid being deported from his village to Siberia by Soviet forces during the mass March deportation of 1949, after being warned by a neighbour. His mother and brother were deported. Lindal's story was the inspiration for Curly Strings 2020 song They Won't Catch Me (Estonian: Mind nad kätte ei saa) and its music video, directed by Johannes Magnus Aule.
