= Elina Reinold =

Estonian actress

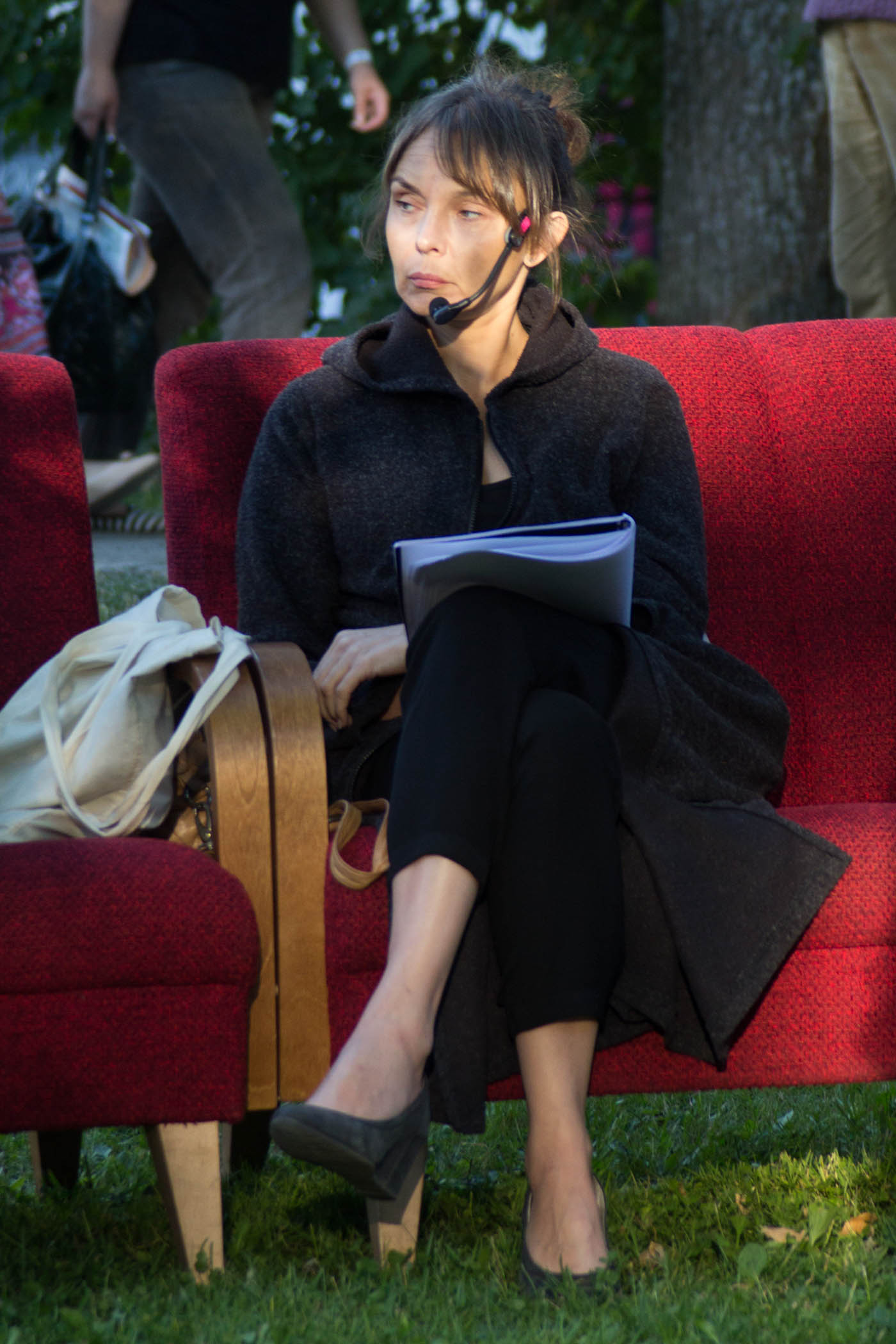
Elina Reinold

Elina Reinold (born 28 December 1971) is an Estonian actress.

Reinold was born in Tallinn. In 1994 she graduated from Estonian Academy of Music and Theatre's Drama School. 1993-2006 she worked at Estonian Drama Theatre. Since 2006 she is a freelance actress. Besides theatrical roles she has also played on several films and television series.

== Filmography ==
- 1995: Wikmani poisid (role: Maila)
- 1994–1996: Õnne 13 (role: Kristi)
- 1999: Lurjus (role: Evelin Timmer)
- 2001: Ladybirds' Christmas (voice role: Leonardo the Cricket)
- 2001: Head käed (role: Nurse)
- 2006: Lotte from Gadgetville (role: Susumu)
- 2007: Kelgukoerad (role: Kärt)
- 2010 and 2013: Kättemaksukontor (role: Mailis in 2010; role: Freya Narvik in 2013-2023)
- 2011: Lotte and the Moonstone Secret (roles: Ernst the Spider and Uno the Tiny Illness Man)
- 2012: Seenelkäik (role: Viivi Kägu)
- 2016: Päevad, mis ajasid segadusse (role: Malle)
- 2018: Tuliliilia (role: Witch)
