= Liina Vahtrik =

Estonian actress

Liina Ertl (née Liina Sallo, known professionally as Liina Vahtrik; born 8 August 1972) is an Estonian actress.

Liina Vahtrik was born in Tallinn to actress and singer Helgi Sallo and opera singer Uno Heinapuu (:et). She attended schools in Tallinn, graduating from Tallinn Secondary School no. 47, before enrolling at the drama department of the Estonian Academy of Music and Theatre in 1994, graduating in 1998.

After graduation from the Estonian Academy of Music and Theatre, in 1998 Vahtrik began an engagement as an actress at the Von Krahl Theatre in Tallinn. She left the Von Krahl Theatre in 2008, became a freelance actress and has appeared in a number of films and television series .

Liina Vahtrik has been married to Hungarian-French Esperantist and translator István Ertl since 2023.

== Selected filmography ==
- 2006 – Tabamata ime (role: Eeva Marland/Pedak)
- 2007 – Jan Uuspõld läheb Tartusse (role: Rahvusema)
- 2007-2011 – Kodu keset linna (role: Sirje Koristaja)
- 2009 – Disko ja tuumasõda (role: Narrator)
- 2009 – Idioot (role: Varja)
- 2016 – Päevad, mis ajasid segadusse (role: Maarika)
- 2016-2018 – Naabriplika (role: Krista Koosar)
- 2018 – Seltsimees laps (role: Aunt Anne)
- 2018 – Lõbus perekond (role: Neighbour)
- 2019 – Lahutus Eesti moodi (role: Laura)
- 2021 – Vahingu päevaraamat
- 2025 – Armukelm (role: Signe)
