= Padjaklubi =

Estonian television series

- Genre: Comedy
- Created by: Kassikuld OÜ
- Written by: Birk Rohelend; Martin Algus; Silvia Soro
- Starring: Katariina Ratasepp; Kristel Aaslaid; Grete Klein; Kertu Moppel
- Country of origin: Estonia
- Original language: Estonian
- No. of seasons: 15
- No. of episodes: 170

Production
- Producers: Ergo Kuld; Martin Algus
- Production location: Tallinn
- Running time: 45 minutes

Original release
- Network: TV3
- Release: March 10, 2014 – January 15, 2022

Padjaklubi (English: The Pillow Club) is an Estonian comedy series that debuted in 2014 and aired on the TV channel TV3 in Estonia.

Written by Birk Rohelend, Martin Algus, Silvia Soro and others, it is the story of four young women with very different personalities, who hold very different worldviews, who end up having to live together, under one roof.

The series was awarded Best TV Series of the Year at the Estonian Entertainment Awards in 2014. The series ended production in 2022.

== Main cast ==
- Katariina Ratasepp – Maria
- Kertu Moppel – Kristina
- Grete Klein – Laura
- Kristel Aaslaid – Misha

== Recurring characters ==
- Sander Rebane – Illimar (2016–2018)
- Amanda Hermiine Künnapas – Elisabeth, Gretta (2016)
- Martin Kõiv – Harly (2015–2016)
- Veiko Tubin – Toomas (2015)
- Imre Õunapuu – Mihkel (2015)
- Merle Jääger – Aunt Saša (2014)
- Raimo Pass – Kalle (2014)
- Kristo Toots – Margus (2013–2014)
- Vilma Luik – Diana (Maria's mother) (2016-2022)
- Reimo Sagor – Ken-Stefan (2017)
- Andres Keil – Ervin (Illimar's father) (2017–2022)
- Margus Grosnõi – Gabriel (2017–2018)
- Janek Joost – Gregor (2018)
- Mihkel Tikerpalu – Ott (2018)
- Kristjan Lüüs – Bert (Hiidlane) (2018–2019)
- Aarne Soro – Meelis (2018)
- Jürgen Pärnsalu – Christian (2018–2022)
- Eliise Ra Tõemäe – Eliise (Laura's niece) (2015)
