= Grete Kuld =

Estonian singer, actress, and television presenter

- Born: 12 February 1989 (age 37); Tallinn, then part of Estonian SSR, Soviet Union
- Citizenship: Estonia
- Occupations: Singer; actress; television presenter

Grete Kuld (née Klein; born 12 February 1989) is an Estonian singer, actress, and television presenter.

== Early life ==
Kuld was born on 12 February 1989 in Tallinn, Estonia.

== Career ==
Kuld became known as a weather forecaster for the Kanal 2 news program Reporter. In 2012, she participated in the TV show Tähed jääl (Stars on Ice). From 2014 to 2022, she portrayed Laura (Laura Pille Lind), one of the four main characters in Padjaklubi (Pillow Club). In 2021, Kuld was awarded the title "Sexiest Woman of the Year". Together with Tõnis Niinemets, she was the presenter of Eesti Laul in 2021, 2023 and 2024.

As a singer, Kuld has released two solo albums and was in the band Sunberryz in 2012.

== Personal life ==
On 13 March 2019, Kuld gave birth to a daughter named Saara. On 26 June 2020, she married her partner Ergo Kuld.

== Discography ==
Studio albums

- Armastusega (2010)
- Liebe (2017)

Singles

- Kruiisime (2012, with Sunberryz)
- Vari (2014)
- Ma valin Sind ft. Margus Vaher (2015)

== Filmography ==
=== Film ===
Year	Role	Film
2016	Josefine	Klassikokkutulek
2021	Isabel	Jahihooaeg
2016	Proua Martinson	Soo

=== Television ===
Year	Role	Series
2010–2011	Mia	Kelgukoerad
2014–2022	Laura-Pille Lind	Padjaklubi
2016	Rebekka	Miks mitte?!
2022	Doris Vastsemägi	Naised vormis
