= Arvi Mägi =

Estonian actor and director

- Born: February 25, 1949 (age 77); Tartu, then part of Estonian SSR, Soviet Union

Arvi Mägi (born 25 February 1949) is an Estonian actor and theatre director.

In 1971, he graduated from Tallinn Pedagogical Institute with a degree in stage arts. From 1971 until 1989 and from 1993 until 1994, he was an actor at the Rakvere Theatre; from 1989 until 1993, he was also its artistic leader (Estonian: kunstiline juht). From 1994 until 2015, he worked at Ugala Theatre in Viljandi. Since 2016, he is engaged at the Kuressaare Town Theatre. Besides stage roles, he has also acted on films and in television series.

== Awards ==
- 1982: Ants Lauter Prize
- 1984: Meritorious Artist of the Estonian SSR

== Filmography ==
- 1981: Keskpäev
- 2013: Naabriplika
- 2013: Hakkab jälle pihta
- 2015: Varjudemaa
- 2016: Klassikokkutulek
