= Melchior the Apothecary =

2022 film directed by Kristian Taska and others

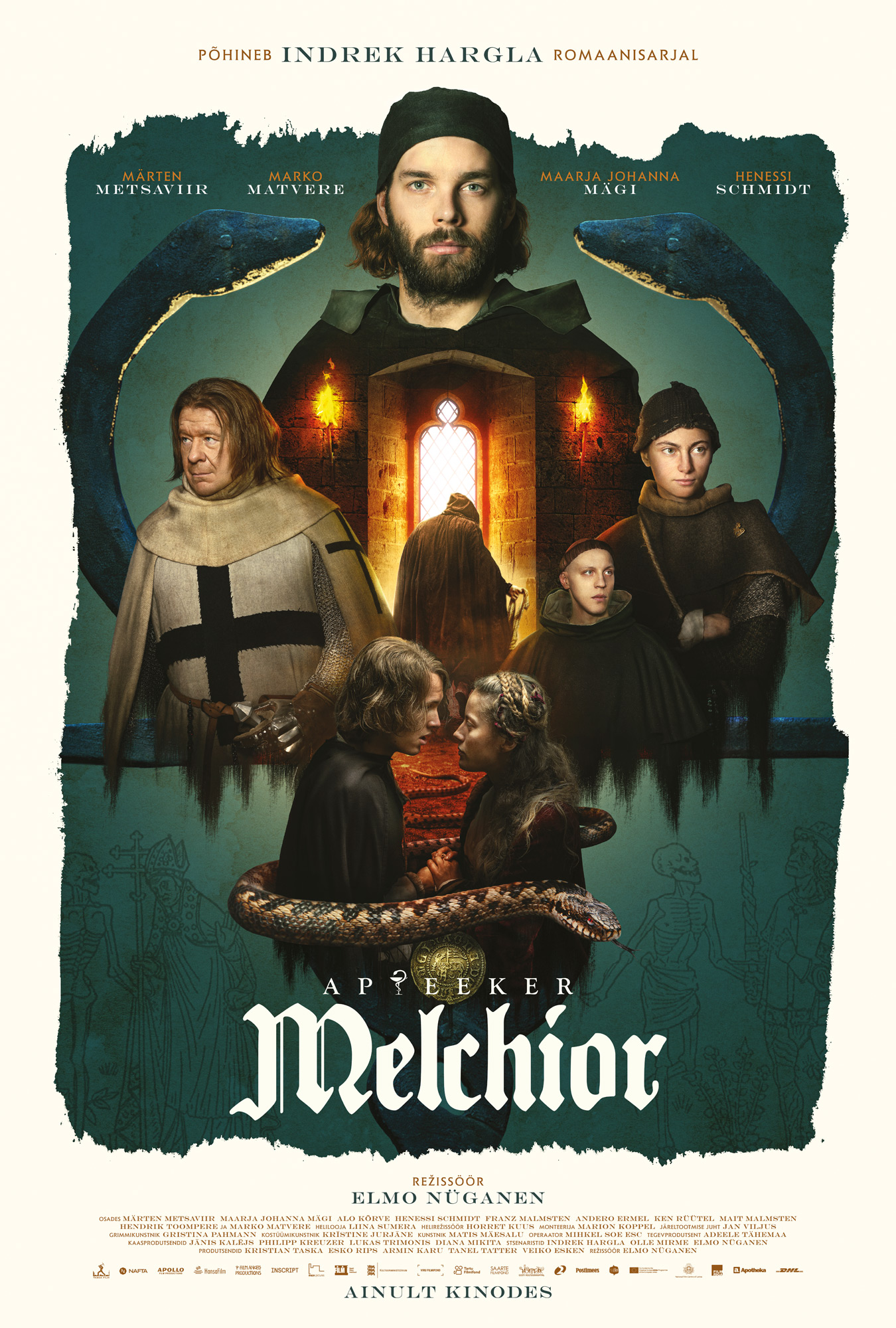
- Film poster
- Directed by: Elmo Nüganen
- Written by: Indrek Hargla; Elmo Nüganen; Olle Mirme
- Produced by: Kristian Taska; Esko Rips; Veiko Esken; Tanel Tatter; Armin Karu
- Starring: Märten Metsaviir; Alo Kõrve; Maarja Johanna Mägi
- Cinematography: Mihkel Soe
- Edited by: Marion Koppel
- Music by: Liina Sumera
- Distributed by: Taska Film, Nafta Films, Apollo Film Productions, Hansafilm
- Release date: 11 April 2022
- Countries: Estonia, Latvia, Germany
- Language: Estonian

Melchior the Apothecary (Estonian: Apteeker Melchior) is a 2022 Estonian historical mystery film. It is the first instalment of the Melchior trilogy, based on the novels by Indrek Hargla. The film stars Märten Metsaviir as the apothecary Melchior Wakenstede, who solves crimes in medieval Tallinn. The film is directed by Elmo Nüganen.

== Background ==
The film was set to premiere in October 2021, but was delayed to April 2022 due to the COVID-19 pandemic.

The second part of the trilogy Melchior the Apothecary: The Ghost, was issued in August 2022, and the third Melchior the Apothecary: The Executioner’s Daughter followed in October. It is the first time in Estonia film history where an entire trilogy were premiered within a single calendar year.

Filming locations in Tallinn included St. Catherine's Monastery, Danish King's Garden, Town Hall Square and Pikk Jalg street. Some scenes were also filmed in Kuressaare Castle.

The film is one of the most successful in Estonian cinema history with cinema admissions of 125,500 by 31 August 2022. It is one of only 11 Estonian films to receive over 100,000 cinema admissions since Estonia restored independence. The film received a limited release in Vantaa, Finland, with producer Veiko Esken citing the response as positive and planning to screen the sequels in Vantaa, as well.

== Cast ==
- Märten Metsaviir as Melchior Wakestende
- Maarja Johanna Mägi as Keterlyn Wakenstede (née Kordt)
- Alo Kõrve as Wentzel Dorn
- Siim Kelner as Clingenstain
- Ken Rüütel as Hinric the Monk
- Marko Matvere as Spanheim
- Martin Kork as Martin
- Mait Malmsten as Rode
- Kristjan Sarv as Rinus
- Andero Ermel as Freisinck
- Franz Malmsten as Kilian
- Henessi Schmidt as Hedwig
- Hendrik Toompere Jr. as Casendrope
- Jaan Pehk as Ditmar
- Gatis Gaga as Ludeke
- Helgur Rosental as Vicke
- Volli Käro as Lodevic
- Sten Zupping as Wunbald
- Martin Mill as Heerold
- Liis Maria Kaabel as Valge Akrobaat
- Loora-Eliise Kaarelson as Girl at Courtroom
- Amanda Hermiine Künnapas as Servant Girl
- Simeoni Sundja as Town Soldier
