= Katariina Ratasepp =

Estonian actress

- Born: 26 November 1986 (age 39); Tallinn, then part of Estonian SSR, Soviet Union
- Citizenship: Estonia
- Occupation: Actress

Katariina Libe (née Ratasepp; born 26 November 1986) is an Estonian actress.

In 2012, Ratasepp graduated from the Drama School at Estonian Academy of Music and Theatre, which was supervised by Elmo Nüganen.

She is primarily known for her role in the TV series Padjaklubi (Pillow Club), where she portrayed Eva-Lota Maria from 2014 to 2022.

== Personal life ==
Ratasepp is the younger sister of actress Ursula Ratasepp.

Ratasepp was married to actor Mihkel Kabel from 2009 to 2011, they have a son, Rudolf Mattias, born on 5 January 2009. On 17 December 2016, her second son was born. In 2019, she got engaged to TV and radio journalist Taavi Libe. They got married in July 2021.

== Filmography ==
=== Television ===
Year	Role	Series
2007	administrator	Ohtlik lend
2014		Viimane võmm
2014–2022	Maria	Padjaklubi
2017	Kirke	Vabad mehed
