= Maarja Johanna Mägi =

Estonian actress

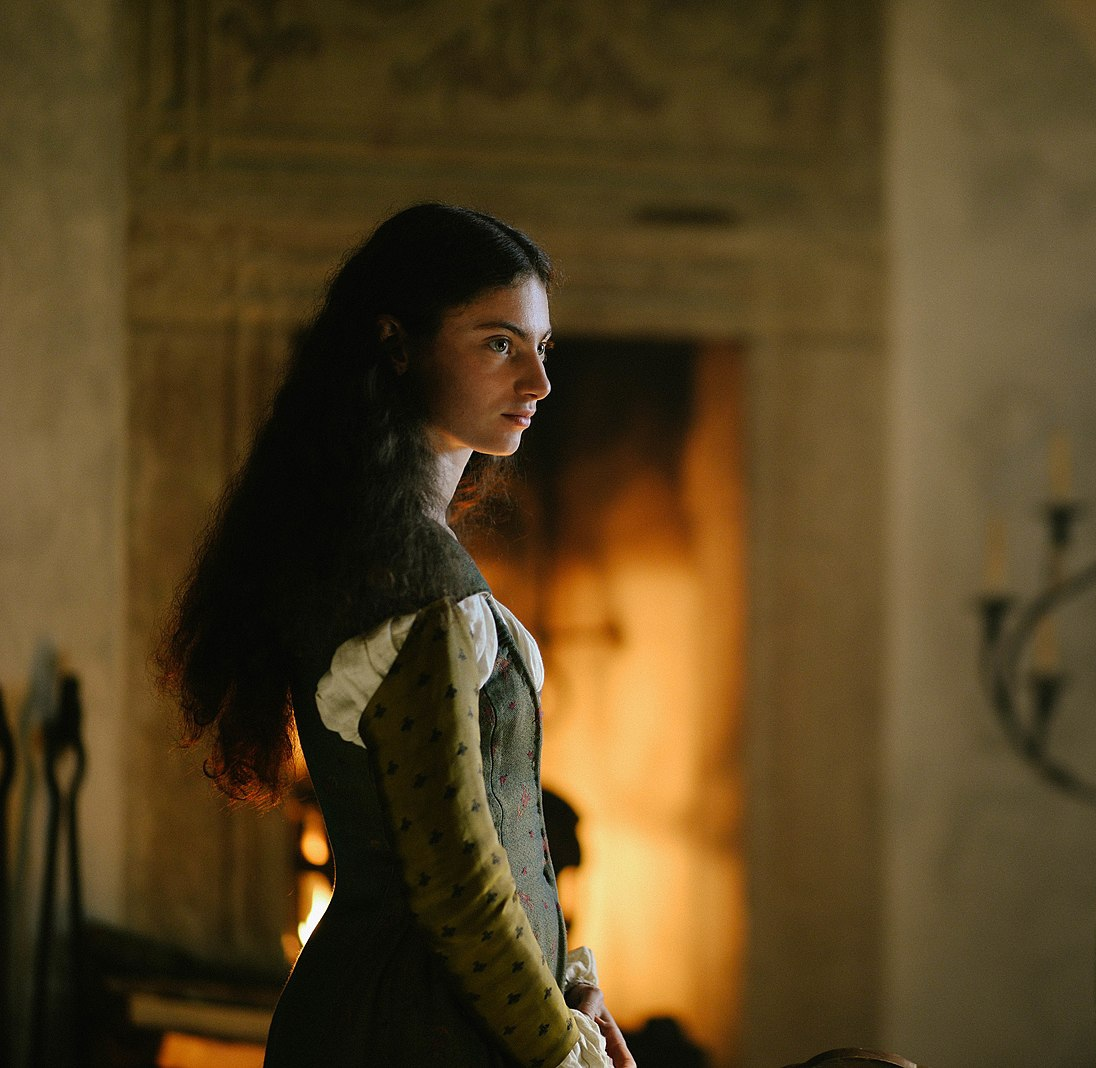
- Maarja Johanna Mägi in the movie Melchior the Apothecary. The Ghost (2022)
- Born: Maarja Johanna Mägi; 24 March 1997 (age 29); Tartu, Estonia
- Occupation: Actress
- Years active: 2020 – present
- Awards: Estonian Film and Television Awards (EFTA) - Best Actress in film (2023).

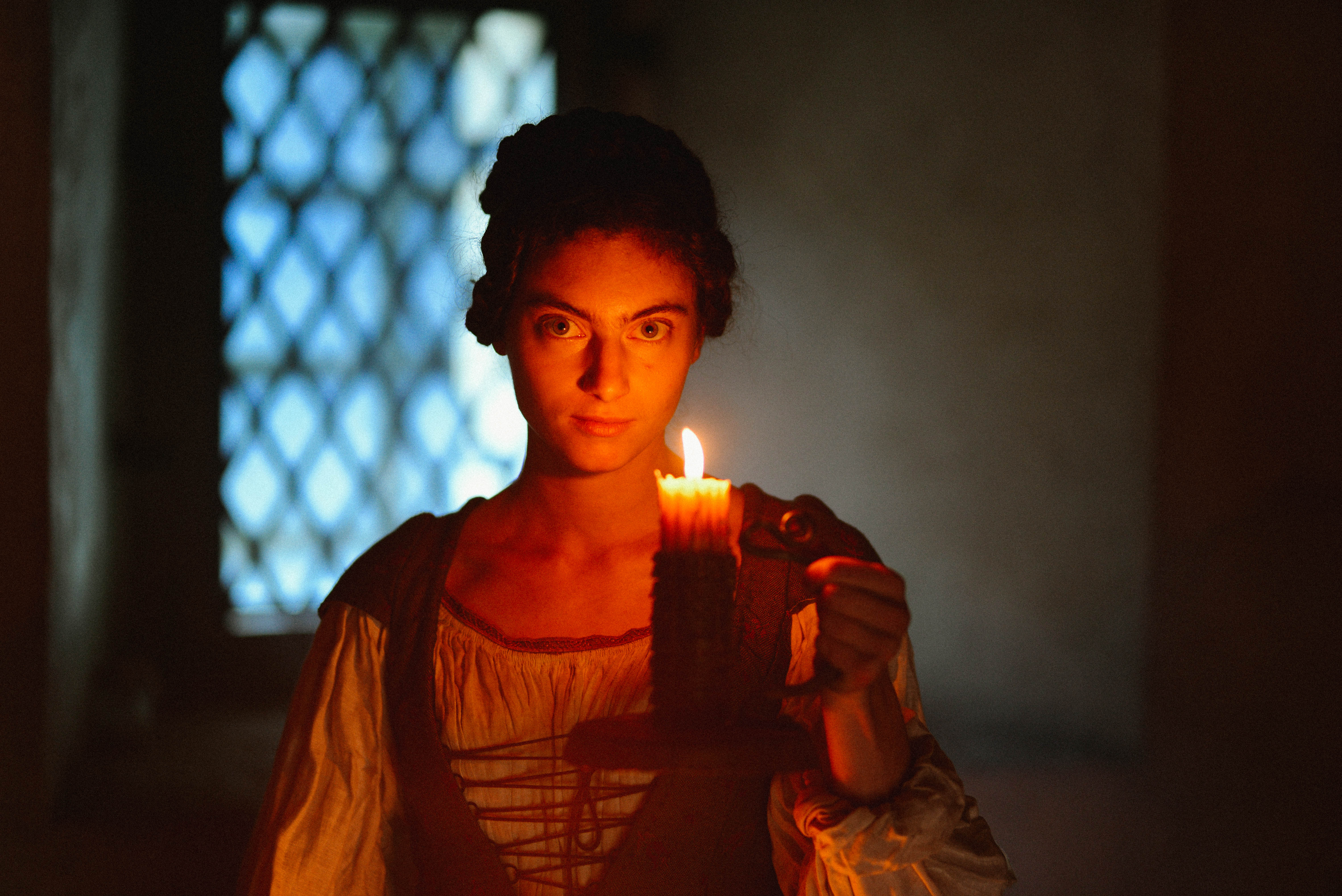
Maarja Johanna Mägi in the movie Melchior the Apothecary. The Ghost (2022)

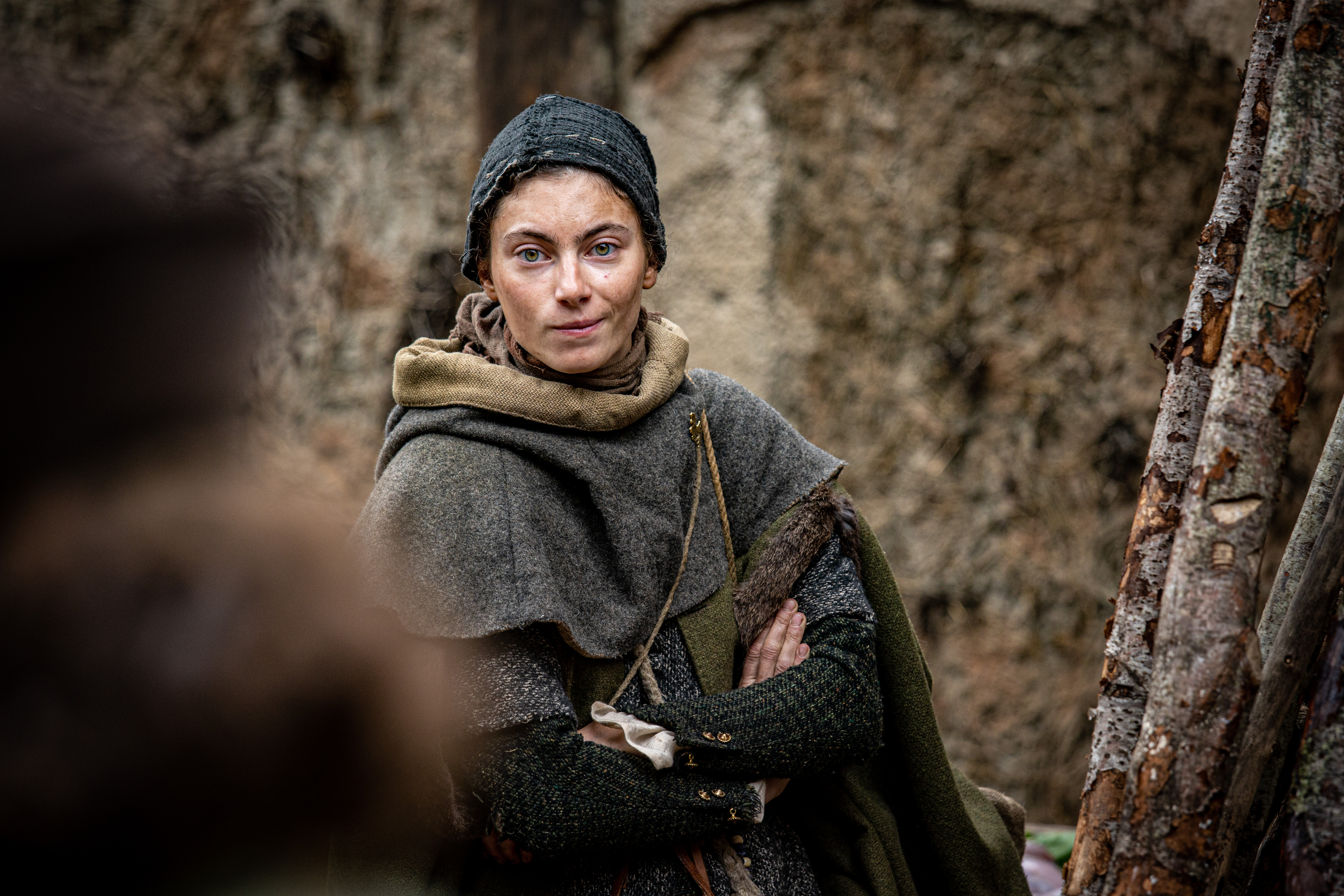
Maarja Johanna Mägi in the film Melchior the Apothecary (2022)

Maarja Johanna Mägi (born 24 March 1997) is an Estonian stage and film actress.

Maarja Johanna Mägi was born in Tartu. She graduated from the Estonian Academy of Music and Theatre in Tallinn in 2020. She has been an actress at the Vanemuine theatre in Tartu since 2020.

Mägi has played a starring role of Keterlyn Kordt in a three-part series of historical drama films Melchior the Apothecary, directed by Elmo Nüganen: Melchior the Apothecary (April 2022), Apteeker Melchior. The Ghost (August 2022), and Apteeker Melchior. The Executioner’s Daughter (October 2022). The films are based on the historical mystery crime novels by Indrek Hargla.

In 2022, she was cast in the role of Leena in a folk comedy Faulty Brides, directed by Ergo Kuld. The movie was made in the Matsalu National Park in summer 2022 and the film was premiered in autumn 2023. The movie is based on the story of same name by Eduard Vilde from the year 1888.

In 2025, she had a starring role in the Andres Maimik and Rain Tolk-directed drama film Aurora.

== Recognition ==
- Voldemar Panso Award (2019)
- Vanemuine Colleague Award, for the most busy actor of the year (2022; played 67 plays during year 2021)
- Honorary title of "Tartu Culture Bearer"; Young Culture Bearer of the Year (2022)
- Estonian Film and Television Awards (EFTA) - Best Actress for the role of Keterlyn in Melchior the Apothecary (2023)
- Best Colleague of the Year Award - Theatre Vanemuine (2023)
