= Klassikokkutulek =

2016 film directed by Rene Vilbre

- Directed by: René Vilbre
- Starring: Mait Malmsten; Ago Anderson; G-Enka
- Release date: 19 February 2016
- Running time: 1h 30min
- Country: Estonia
- Language: Estonian

Klassikokkutulek (English: Class Reunion) is a 2016 Estonian comedy film directed by René Vilbre.

== Cast ==
- Mait Malmsten - Mart
- Ago Anderson - Andres
- G-Enka - Toomas
- Maarja Jakobson - Juta
- Franz Malmsten - Joonas
- Märt Pius - Young boss
- Arvi Mägi - Doctor
- Gerli Rosenfeld - Tüdruk
- Maris Kõrvits - Lea
- Sofia Fe Soe - Saara
- Kadri Adamson - Anne
- Mart Müürisepp - Ken-Priidik
- Kristjan Lüüs - Young man
- Britta Soll - Sperm clinic doctor
- Mari Lill – Old woman
- Karin Rask – Simone
- Grete Klein – Josefine
- Kristiina-Hortensia Port – Jane
- Leino Rei – Roland
- Ülle Lichtfeldt – Eva
- Martin Algus – Father
- Ciara Simone Pirn – Tütar
- Allan Kress – Olle
- Mait Trink – Peter
- Marika Korolev – Luule
- Karmel Eikner – Ulla
- Kaja Plovits – Karin
- Ene Järvis – History teacher
- Mari Lill – Old woman
- Nikolai Bentsler – Fat man
