= The Days That Confused =

2016 film directed by Triin Ruumet

- Directed by: Triin Ruumet
- Release date: 8 April 2016
- Running time: 1h 45min
- Country: Estonia
- Language: Estonian

The Days That Confused (Estonian: Päevad, mis ajasid segadusse) is a 2016 Estonian comedy-drama film directed by Triin Ruumet. The film stars Hendrik Toompere Jr. Jr. and Klaudia Tiitsmaa.

== Plot ==
Allar (Hendrik Toompere Jr. Jr.), a disaffected man from rural Estonia is on a frantic journey through midsummer Estonia in the late 1990s trying to discover purpose and meaning in his life.

== Cast ==
- Hendrik Toompere Jr. Jr. as Allar
- Juhan Ulfsak as Juulius
- Jaanika Arum as Nele
- Taavi Eelmaa as Pontu
- Klaudia Tiitsmaa as Maria
- Juss Haasma as Mattias
- Liina Vahtrik as Maarika
- Kait Kall as Pets
- Kristjan Lüüs as Andres
- Reimo Sagor as Toomas
- Kethi Uibomägi as Riina
- Merlyn Uusküla as Jaana
- Ott Aardam as Herko
- Igor Maasik as Uncle Bella
- Katariina Tamm as Katariina
- Kaisa Selde as Kaisa
- Rita Kender as Merli
- Joosep Jürgenson as Young Uncle Bella
- Henry Mandel as Maarek
- Liina Vahtrik as Maarika
- Hendrik Toompere Jr. as Jaak
- Merle Palmiste as Mari
- Margus Prangel as Aivo
- Markus Dvinjaninov as Lauri
- Ingrid Margus as Marta
- Andres Maimik as Margus
- Viiu Maimik as Grandmother
- Hela Kindsiveer as Volleyball Coach
