= Tartu University Clinic =

Hospital in Tartu, Estonia

Coordinates: 58°22′11.95″N 26°42′0.1″E

Geography
- Location: Tartu, Estonia

Organisation
- Funding: Public hospital
- Type: Teaching
- Affiliated university: University of Tartu

Services
- Emergency department: Yes
- Beds: 965

Helipads
- Helipad: Yes

History
- Opened: 1804

Links
- Website: www.kliinikum.ee/eng

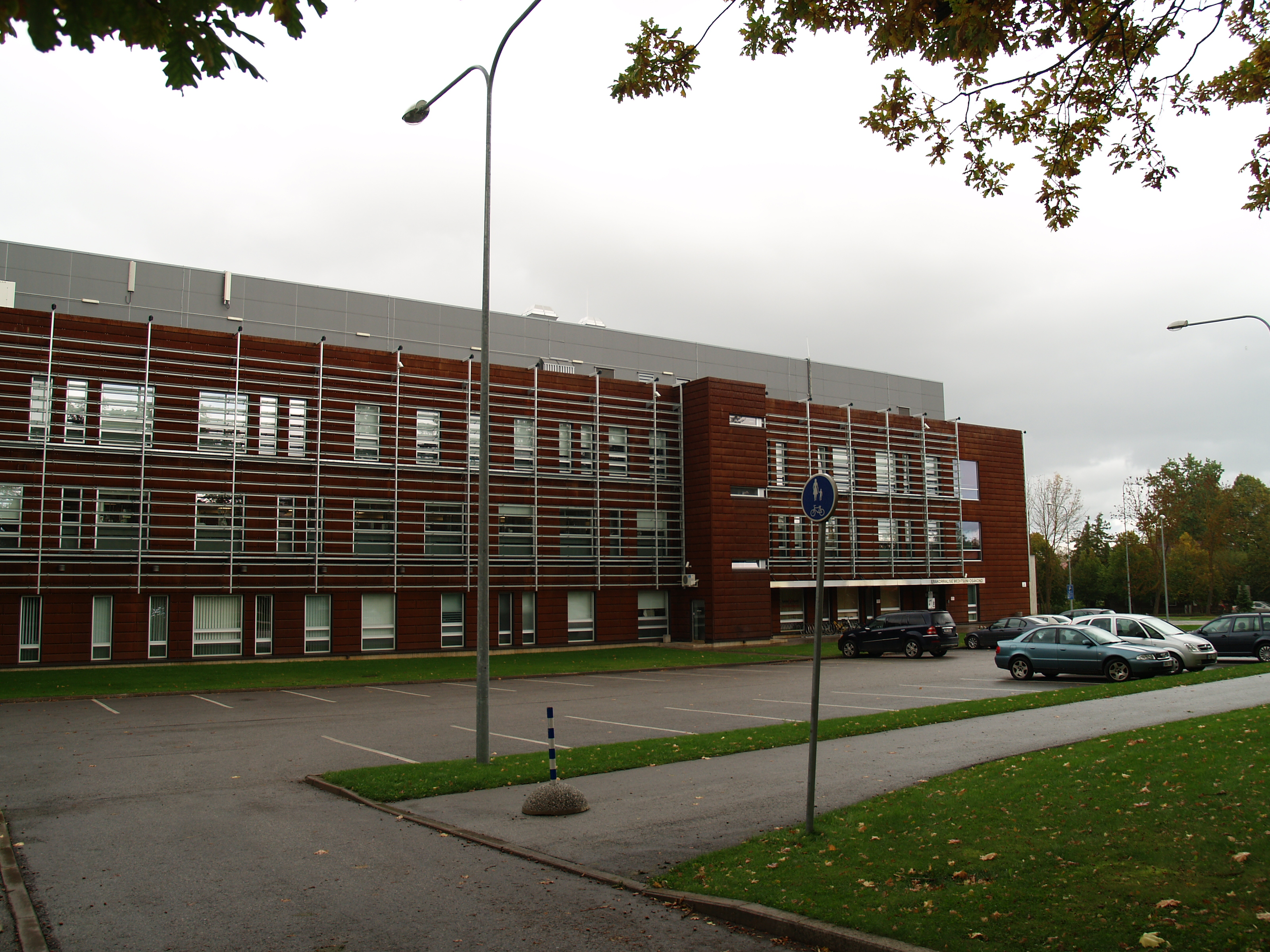
The main building

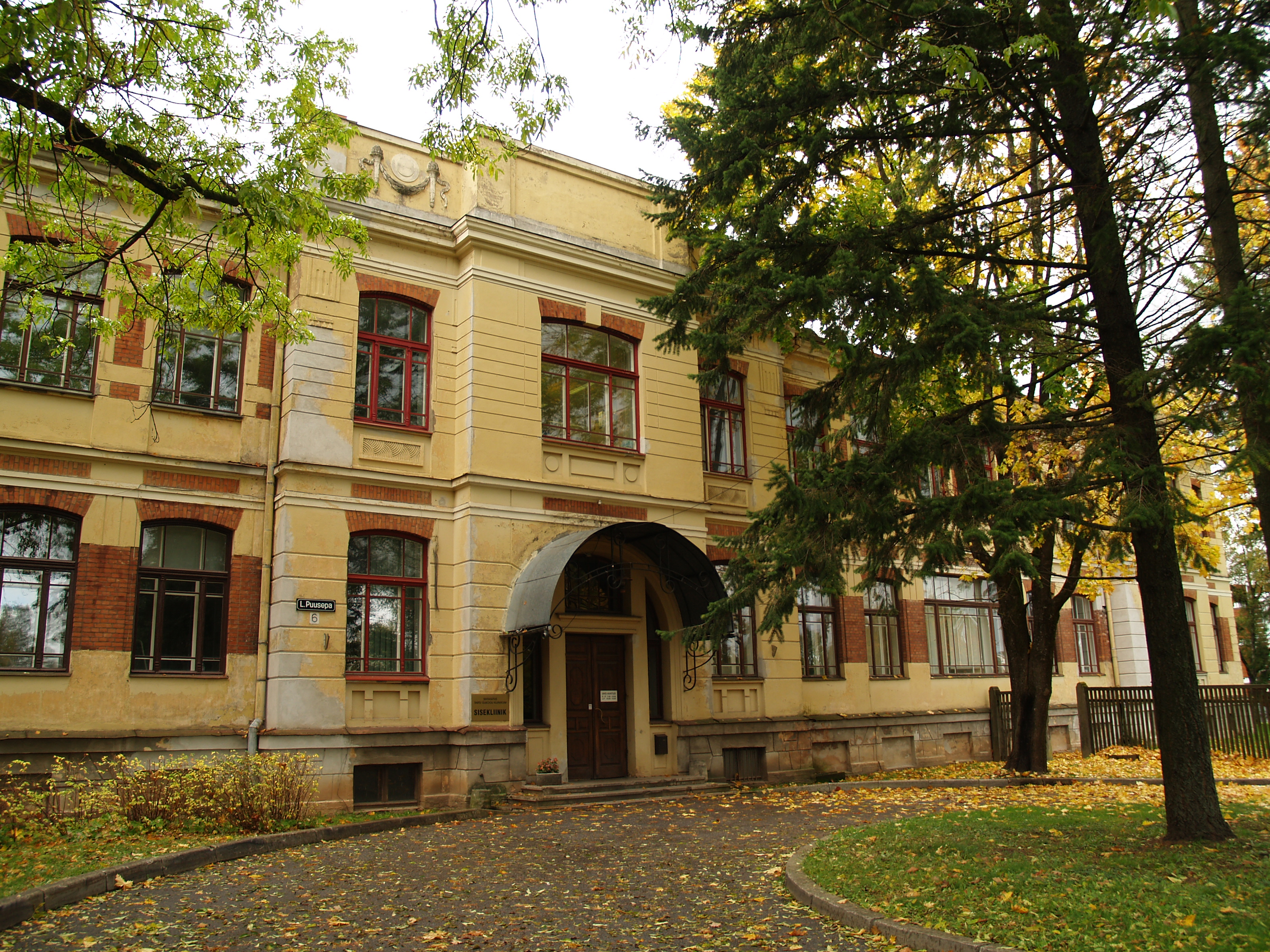
Clinic of Internal Medicine

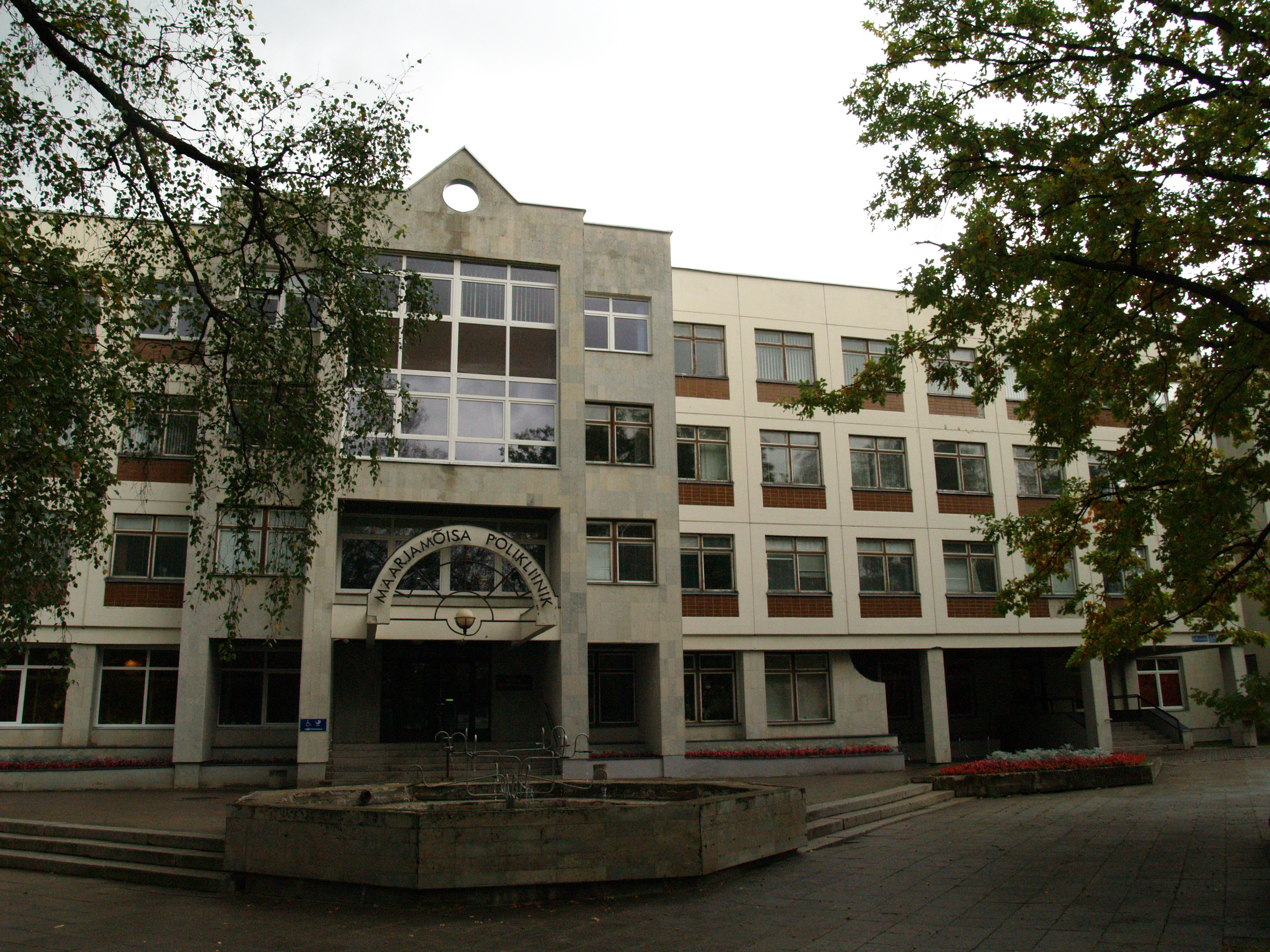
Maarjamõisa Polyclinic

The Tartu University Clinic (Estonian: Tartu Ülikooli Kliinikum) is a healthcare and medical teaching service in Tartu, Estonia, and a subsidiary of the Tartu University. Its administrative services are located in two buildings on Puusepa Street; its buildings are located throughout the city of Tartu. As an exception, the Clinic's andrology clinic has a facility in Tallinn, on Gonsiori Street.

The clinic had a pioneering role in the study of mental illnesses, as it was the world's first university clinic with a psychiatry department. Famous German psychiatrist Emil Kraepelin worked there.

The surgery of the clinic is connected with works of famous Russian surgeons Nikolay Pirogov (worked there in 1836–1840) and Nikolai Burdenko (worked there in 1906–1918).

== Hospital ==
The Tartu University Hospital, also known as Tartu Hospital, located at 8 Puusepa Street, is a part of the Tartu University Clinic.
