= Curly Strings =

Estonian musical group

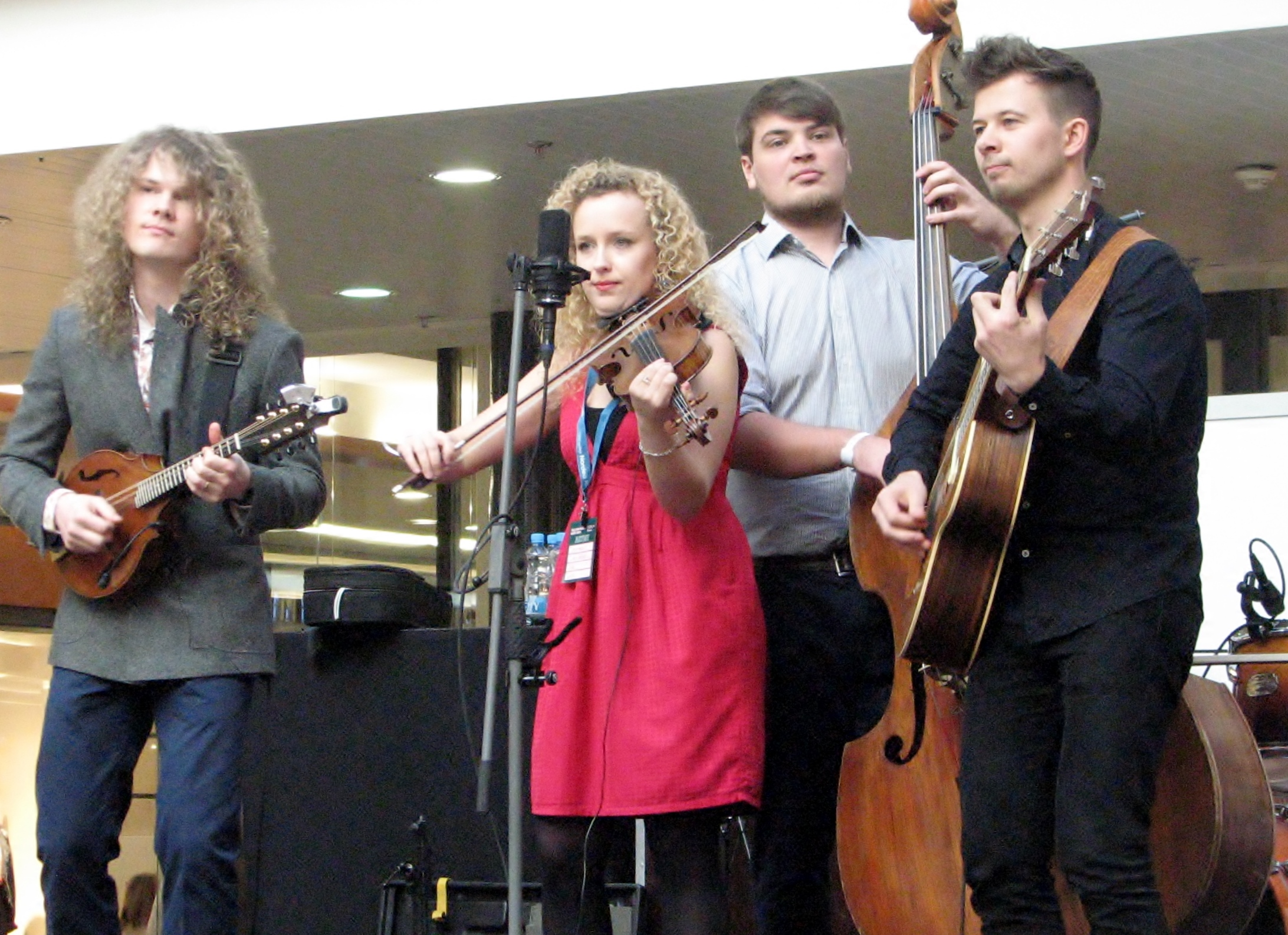
Curly Strings, 2014

Curly Strings is an Estonian folk band which was established in 2013.

In 2023, ahead of the band's 10th anniversary, they were commemorated for their services to Estonian music with a tram bearing their name in Tallinn.

== Members ==
- Eeva Talsi – fiddle, lead vocals
- Taavet Niller – upright bass, vocals
- Peeter Hirtentreu – guitar, vocals
- Villu Talsi – mandolin

== Discography ==
=== Albums ===
- 2014 "Üle ilma"
- 2015 "Elumäng"
- 2017 "Hoolima"
- 2020 "Sümfooniline Curly Strings"
- 2020 Curly Strings ja Sõbrad "Lastele"
- 2021 "Pidu meis eneses"
- 2021 "Rahu meis eneses"

== Awards ==
Band has won several awards:

Estonian Folk Music Awards

- Album of the year 2015
- Band of the year 2015
- Best New Folk Artist 2017

Estonian Ethno Music Awards

- Best New Folk Artist 2015.

European World of Bluegrass Awards

- European Bluegrass Band 2016
