= Ago Anderson =

Estonian actor (born 1972)

Ago Anderson (born 8 April 1972) is an Estonian actor.

Anderson was born in Pärnu. Since 1994 he has been working at Endla Theatre. He has also played in several films and television series.

== Selected roles in films and television series ==
- 1995 Wikmani poisid (television series)
- 2005 Malev (film)
- 2005 Shop of Dreams (film)
- 2008 Tuulepealne maa (television series)
- 2011-2012 Kälimehed (television series)
- 2012–2013 Ment (television series)
- 2014 Keskea rõõmud (television series)
- 2016 Polaarpoiss (film)
- 2016 Klassikokkutulek (film)
- 2020 Sipsik (animated film)
- 2021 Süü (television series)
- 2023 Suvitajad (film)
- 2024 Tulnukas 2 ehk Valdise tagasitulek 17 osas (film)
- 2024 Vari (film)
- 2026 Säärane mulk (film)
