= Disco and Atomic War =

2009 film directed by Jaak Kilmi

- Disko ja tuumasõda
- Directed by: Jaak Kilmi
- Written by: Kiur Aarma, Jaak Kilmi
- Produced by: Kiur Aarma, Aleksi Bardy, Annika Sucksdorff
- Cinematography: Manfred Vainokivi
- Edited by: Lauri Kaasik
- Music by: Ardo Ran Varres
- Production company: Eetriüksus
- Release date: April 7, 2009 (Estonia)
- Running time: 80 minutes
- Country: Estonia
- Language: Estonian

Disco and Atomic War (Estonian: Disko ja tuumasõda) is a 2009 Estonian documentary film written by Jaak Kilmi. In the film, Kilmi talks about illegally watching Finnish television in communist Estonia as a boy. He describes, among other things, how his father made special converters for Soviet television sets to watch Finnish TV, his mother made TV guides for Finnish television that he would then sell at school, and the popularity of Dallas, Knight Rider, and Emmanuelle in Estonia in the 1980s.

== Awards and nominations ==
- 2009: Warsaw Film Festival Documentary Competition: Best Documentary
- 2009: Jihlava International Documentary Film Festival: Silver Eye for Best Full-Length Documentary
- 2009: Tallinn Black Nights Film Festival, full-length Baltic films: nomination, International Federation of Film Critics Best Baltic Film
- 7th EBS International Documentary Festival: Spirit Award
