= Kättemaksukontor =

- Also known as: The Vengenace Bureau; Revenge Office
- Genre: crime-comedy
- Written by: Mihkel Ulman; Mihkel Seeder; Marite Butkaite; Elise Kumm
- Directed by: Ain Prosa
- Starring: Marika Vaarik-Soo; Kadri Rämmeld; Elina Pähklimägi; Elina Reinold; Adeele Jaago; Ragne Veensalu; Amanda Hermiine Künnapas; Elisabet Reinsalu; Märten Metsaviir
- Opening theme: Uku Suviste "Saatanlik Naine"
- Country of origin: Estonia
- Original language: Estonian
- No. of seasons: 34 (have been released)
- No. of episodes: 396 (have been released)

Production
- Producer: Raivo Suviste
- Production locations: Tallinn, Estonia
- Editor: Ain Prosa
- Running time: 40–50, 80 minutes

Original release
- Network: TV3, Go3
- Release: 30 April 2009 – 2027

Kättemaksukontor (English: The Vengeance Bureau or Revenge Office) is an Estonian comedy-crime television series. In the series, a group of women own an organization called "Kättemaksukontor", which helps to solve murder cases for the police.

The series is written by Mihkel Ulman, directed by Ain Prosa, and produced by Raivo Suviste.

It began airing in 2009, and is broadcast on TV3 and Go3. The series will end with the final 34th season in the autumn of 2026.

== Series overview ==
- The founders of "Kättemaksukontor" are two women – former homicide detective Frida Arrak and former secretary Marion Pärn. Despite their contrasting personalities and worldviews, they are united by a common hatred for males, which leads them to the idea of offering revenge services to other women.
- In season 6, they are joined by master thief Häidi Õigepaulus. When Frida decides to become a nun in season 10, her younger sister, physicist Freya Narvik, takes her place.
- In season 11, Häidi leaves and is replaced by former police investigator Kirke Klein. After Kirke leaves at the end of season 13, former street kid Luna Haab joins the team. When Luna decides to become a survival instructor at the end of season 24, the young and inexperienced Lumi-Lee Aigo joins in season 25.
- At the beginning of season 31, it is revealed that Freya and Marion have left "Kättemaksukontor". Lumi-Lee decides to close the office and start a new life with her partner Madis, but a series of incoming cases constantly postpone this decision. During one investigation, she crosses paths with lawyer Barbara Laando, whom she initially suspects of murder. Throughout the season, Lumi-Lee works with Barbara and Madis, solving various cases. In the final episode of the season, Barbara becomes an official member of the Revenge Office. After solving the last case, the trio decides to go on a trip together. When they leave the airport, Freya walks through the terminal door at the same time, unexpectedly returning to Estonia.
- At the beginning of season 32, Freya returns to Estonia because her documents have expired. She soon discovers that Milana Luuve is also back in Estonia. When Freya, along with Barbara and Lumi-Lee, begins to investigate the case, it turns out that it is related to her husband Emil. After years of hiding, Emil has reappeared and is working for Milana, helping to create a prototype of a dangerous weapon. With Freya's help, Milana is finally caught and the case is solved. Freya and Emil are then offered to join a new lab team abroad, which they accept.
- In season 33, an old acquaintance Martin Arrak appears, asking the detectives for help in stealing a painting and also wants to find a famous art dealer. Barbara becomes Martin's bodyguard, which turns out to be dangerous. With the help of the Revenge Office, the language is caught and the famous art dealer is also found.
- In season 34, the Revenge Office closes its doors. In addition to Lumi-Lee, Barbara and Madis, the latest cases also include Frida, Marion and Häidi. The season is full of surprises and Gerth and Kaspar also appear.

== Cast ==
Actors, who had the main roles in "The Revenge Office"
Actor	Years acted	Seasons acted in
Marika Vaarik–Soo	2009–2013, 2018, 2026	1–9, 20, 34
Kadri Rämmeld	2009–2024, 2026	1–30, 34
Elina Pähklimägi	2009–2013, 2018, 2026	1–10, 20, 34
Elina Reinold	2013–2024	10–32
Adeele Jaago	2013–2015	10–13
Ragne Veensalu	2015–2020, 2023	14–25, 29
Amanda Hermiine Künnapas	2021–2026	25–34
Elisabet Reinsalu	2024–2026	31–34
Märten Metsaviir	2023–2026	29–34

Actors, who starred in "The Revenge Office"
Actor	Part in the series	Years acted in series	Season acted in
Revenge Office Private Investigators
Marika Vaarik	Frida Arrak (née Idasaar)	2009–2013, 2018, 2026	1–9, 20, 34
Kadri Rämmeld	Marion Pärn	2009–2023, 2026	1–30, 34
Elina Pähklimägi	Häidi Õigepaulus	2009–2013, 2018, 2026	1–10, 20, 34
Elina Reinold	Freya Narvik (née Idasaar)	2013–2024	10–32
Adeele Jaago	Kirke Klein	2013–2015	10–13
Ragne Veensalu	Luna Haab	2015–2021, 2023	14–25, 29
Amanda Hermiine Künnapas	Lumi–Lee Aigo	2021–2026	25–34
Elisabet Reinsalu	Barbara Laando	2024–2026	31–34
Märten Metsaviir	Madis Toor	2023–2026	29–34
Police investigators
Märt Avandi	Gerth Maango	2009–2011, 2013, 2017–2018, 2021, 2026	1–5, 9, 17, 20, 26, 34
Ott Sepp	Kaspar Tuvi	2009–2011, 2013, 2017–2018, 2021, 2026	1–5, 9, 17–18, 20, 26, 34
Marilyn Jurman	Sonja Maango (before Säde)	2010–2011, 2017	3–6, 17
Jaan Rekkor	Rein Pihelgas (Mr. Neat)	2010–2013	4–9
Tarvo Sõmer	Tiit Marvel	2011–2026	5–34
Sergo Vares	Karl Suur	2012–2013	8–9
Juss Haasma	Rainis Sõber	2013–2016, 2018	10–15, 20
Ireen Kennik	Selene Kronk	2015–2020	14–23
Risto Vaidla	Rasmus Uuber	2016–2017	16–17
Kristjan Lüüs	Sander Pronks	2017, 2019–2026	18, 21–34
Mark Erik Savi	Joosep Liblik	2024–2026	31–34
Supporting actors
Kristjan Sarv	Kaur Moks	2009–2013, 2018–2022	1–10, 20–21, 23, 25, 28
Sepo Seeman	Martin Arrak	2009–2013, 2025	1–3, 5–7, 10, 33
Eduard Salmistu	Armin Eila	2009–2010, 2014, 2016, 2024	1, 4, 11–12, 16, 32
Guido Kangur	Mart Mesilane (Mr. Hurmur)	2009–2013, 2016–2019, 2022–2023	2–3, 5, 8–9, 15–17, 20, 22, 27, 29
Merle Talvik	Tiiu Pärn	2009, 2012, 2016, 2020–2023	2, 8, 16, 24, 26, 28, 30
Heino Seljamaa	Kalju Pärn	2009, 2012, 2016, 2020–2023	2, 8, 16, 24, 26, 28, 30
Nikolai Bentsler	Aleksander Vesper	2010–2022, 2026	3–5, 8–9, 11, 13–19, 22–23, 25–27, 34
Ain Prosa	Sergei Hämaläinen	2010, 2013, 2016–2020, 2022–2026	3–4, 9, 12, 15, 17, 20–22, 24, 29, 32–34
Carmen Mikiver	Ivi Pihelgas	2011–2013	6–9
Alo Kurvits	Hardi Noova (née Taavidson)	2013–2014, 2017, 2019, 2022	9, 11, 17, 22–23, 27
Raimo Pass	Emil Narvik	2013, 2024	10, 32
Tanel Padar	Daniel Frank	2014–2015	11–12
Lauri Kink	Pavel Lust	2015–2019, 2022	14–15, 17–19, 22, 27
Liina Kanemägi–Jõerand	Tuulikki Lust (née Naves)	2015–2019, 2022	14–16, 18–19, 22, 27
Ivo–Ernesto Reinok	Margus Uniloo (FMR, Guy Fawkes)	2016–2017, 2022–2023	15–18, 27, 29
Klaudia Tiitsmaa	Kioko Veega	2017–2018, 2022–2023	18–19, 28–29
Nora Reinsalu	Sandra Pronks	2025–2026	33–34

== Seasons and episodes ==
=== Season 34, autumn 2026 ===
Episode	Episode title	Airing on Go3	Airing on TV3
01	Tagasitulek 1	29.09.2026	autumn 2027
02	Tagasitulek 2	06.10.2026	autumn 2027
03	Tõde ridade vahel 1	13.10.2026	autumn 2027
04	Tõde ridade vahel 2	20.10.2026	autumn 2027
05	Jõulud 1	27.10.2026	autumn 2027
06	Jõulud 2	03.11.2026	autumn 2027
07	Rahatants 1	10.11.2026	autumn 2027
08	Rahatants 2	17.11.2026	autumn 2027
09	TBA	24.11.2026	autumn 2027
10	TBA	01.12.2026	autumn 2027
11	TBA	08.12.2026	autumn 2027
12	TBA	15.12.2026	autumn 2027

== Seasons summary ==
Season	Episodes	Go3 release	TV3 release
1	4		spring 2009
2	12		autumn 2009
3	12		spring 2010
4	12		autumn 2010
5	12		spring 2011
6	12		autumn 2011
7	12		spring 2012
8	12		autumn 2012
9	12		spring 2013
10	12		autumn 2013
11	14		spring 2014
12	12		autumn 2014
13	12		spring 2015
14	12		autumn 2015
15	14		spring 2016
16	12		autumn 2016
17	12		spring 2017
18	12		autumn 2017
19	12		spring 2018
20	12		autumn 2018
21	12		spring 2019
22	12		autumn 2019
23	8		spring 2020
24	12		autumn 2020
25	12		spring 2021
26	12		autumn 2021
27	12		spring 2022
28	12		autumn 2022
29	12	spring 2023	autumn 2023
30	12	autumn 2023	spring 2024
31	12	spring 2024	autumn 2024
32	12	autumn 2024	spring 2025
33	12	autumn 2025	autumn 2026
34	12	autumn 2026	autumn 2027
Episodes total			400

- Started with season 29 to season 34, new seasons were released first on the Go3 platform and then on TV, when the next new season starts and releases on the Go3 platform.
