= Tõnu Õnnepalu =

Estonian writer (born 1962)

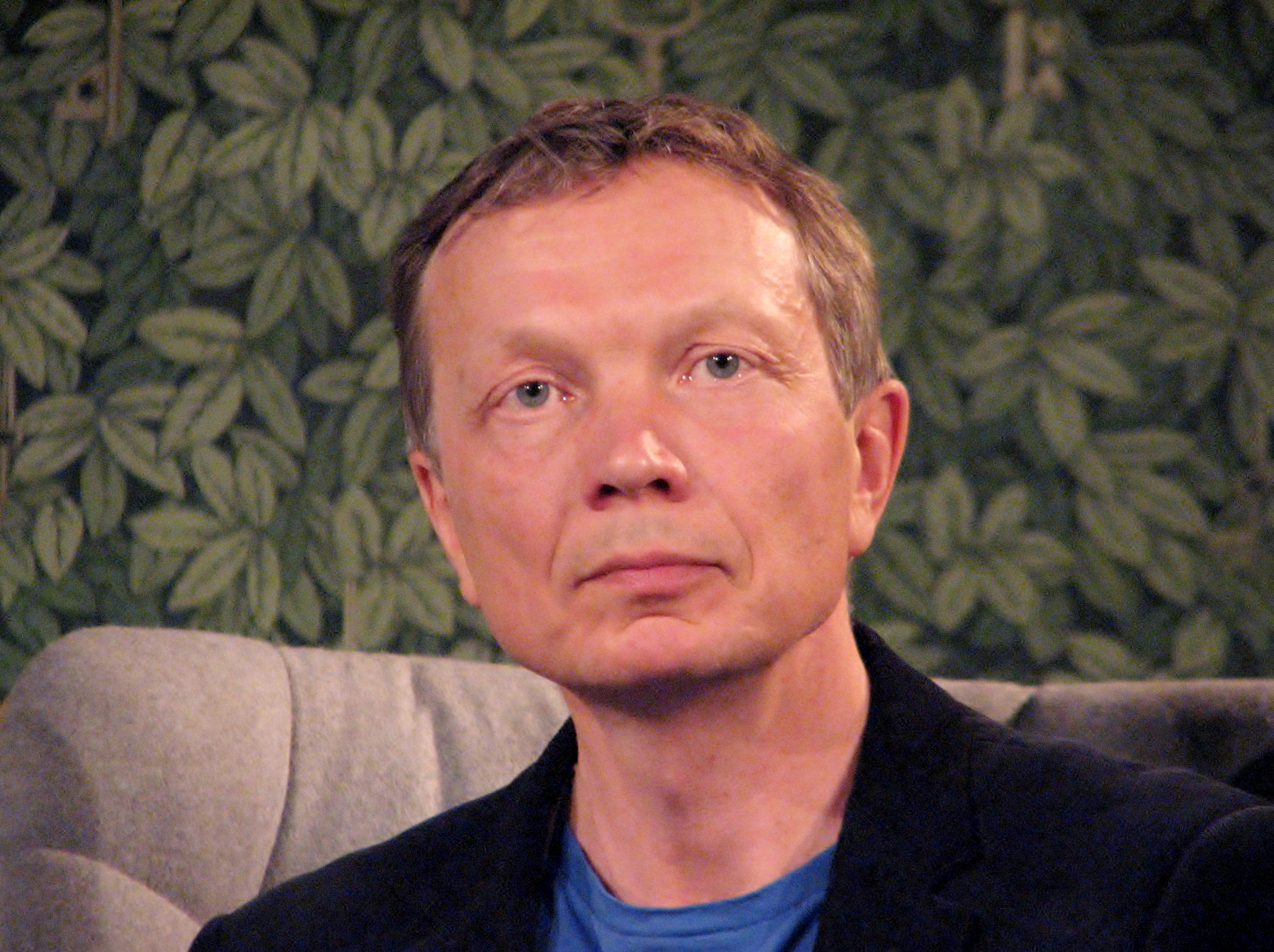
- Tõnu Õnnepalu in 2014
- Born: 13 September 1962 (age 63); Tallinn, then part of Estonian SSR, Soviet Union
- Writing career
- Pen name: Emil Tode, Anton Nigov

Tõnu Õnnepalu (born 13 September 1962), also known by the pen names Emil Tode and Anton Nigov, is an Estonian poet, author and translator.

Õnnepalu was born in Tallinn and studied biology at the University of Tartu from 1980 to 1985. He began his writing career as a poet in 1985 and has published three collections of his works. In 1993 he garnered international attention when his novel Piiririik (English translation: "Border State") was published under his pen name 'Emil Tode'. The book was translated into 14 languages and became the most translated Estonian book of the 1990s. In 1994 he was awarded the Baltic Assembly Prize for Literature. Õnnepalu's work often explores topics such as homosexuality, isolation and betrayal.

In 1992, his poem "Inquiétude du Fini" was performed as a choral piece, with notable Estonian composer Erkki-Sven Tüür acting as conductor.

In addition to writing novels, Tõnu Õnnepalu has translated works into Estonian from the French language by such authors as François Mauriac, Charles Baudelaire and Marcel Proust and has written for such English language publications as the Poetry Society. Tõnu Õnnepalu is also a member of the Board of Governors of the Eesti Maaülikool (Estonian University of Life Sciences) in Tartu.

== Novels ==
- Piiririik ("Border State", as Emil Tode)
  - Published by Tuum, 1993.
- Hind ("The Price", as Emil Tode)
  - Published by Tuum, 1995.
- Mõõt ("The Measure", as Emil Tode)
  - Published by Tuum, 1996.
- Printsess ("Princess", as Emil Tode)
  - Published by Täht, 1997.
- Harjutused ("Practicing", as Anton Nigov)
  - Published by Eesti Keele Sihtasutus, 2002.
- Raadio ("Radio", as Emil Tode)
  - Published by Eesti Keele Sihtasutus, 2002.
  - English translation, Radio, published by Dalkey Archive Press, 2014 (ISBN 1-62897-008-1)
- Paradiis ("Paradise", as Tõnu Õnnepalu)
  - Published by Varrak, 2009.
- Mandala ("Mandala", as Tõnu Õnnepalu)
  - Published by Varrak, 2012.
- Valede kataloog. Inglise aed
  - Published by Eesti Keele Sihtasutus, 2017.
- Lõpmatus (Infinity, as Tõnu Õnnepalu)
  - Published by EKSA, 2019.
- Palk: talvepäevik (Salary: Winter Diary, as Tõnu Õnnepalu)
  - Published by Paradiis, 2021.
- Eesti loodus (Estonian Nature, as Tõnu Õnnepalu)
  - Published by Paradiis, 2022.
- Õhtupäike väikestel majadel: tükk elust (Small Houses in the Evening Sun: A Piece of Life, as Tõnu Õnnepalu)
  - Published by Paradiis, 2024.
- Tööpäev (Workday, as Tõnu Õnnepalu)
  - Published by Varrak, 2026.

== Collections of poetry ==
- Jõeäärne maja, 1985
- Ithaka 1988
- Sel maal, 1990
- Mõõt, 1996
- Enne heinaaega ja hiljem, 2005
- Kevad ja suvi ja, 2009
- Kuidas on elada, 2012
- Klaasveranda, 2016
- Pimeduse tunnel, 2020
- Kevaded ja aastad 2022
