= Indrek Hargla =

Estonian writer

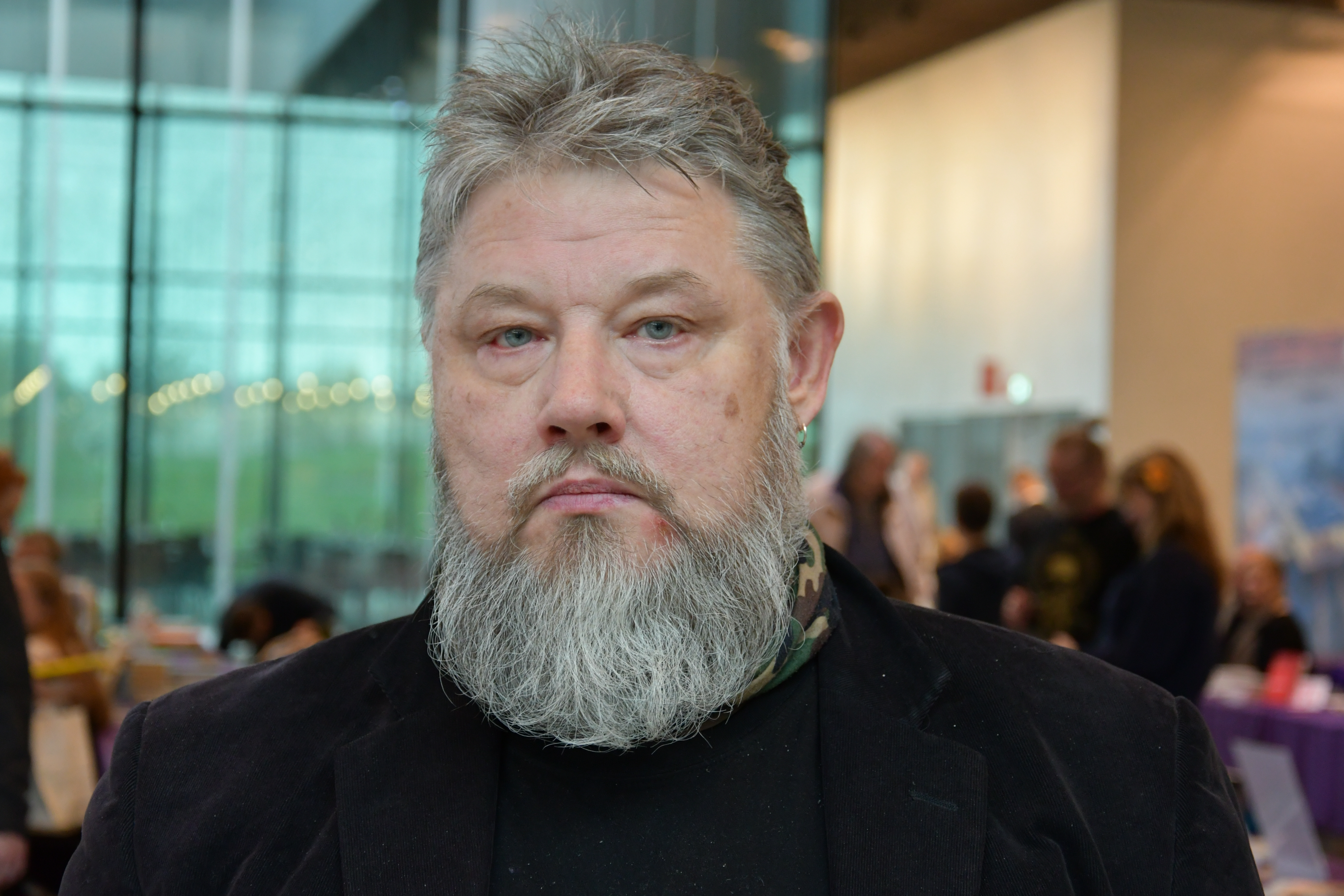
Indrek Hargla in 2025

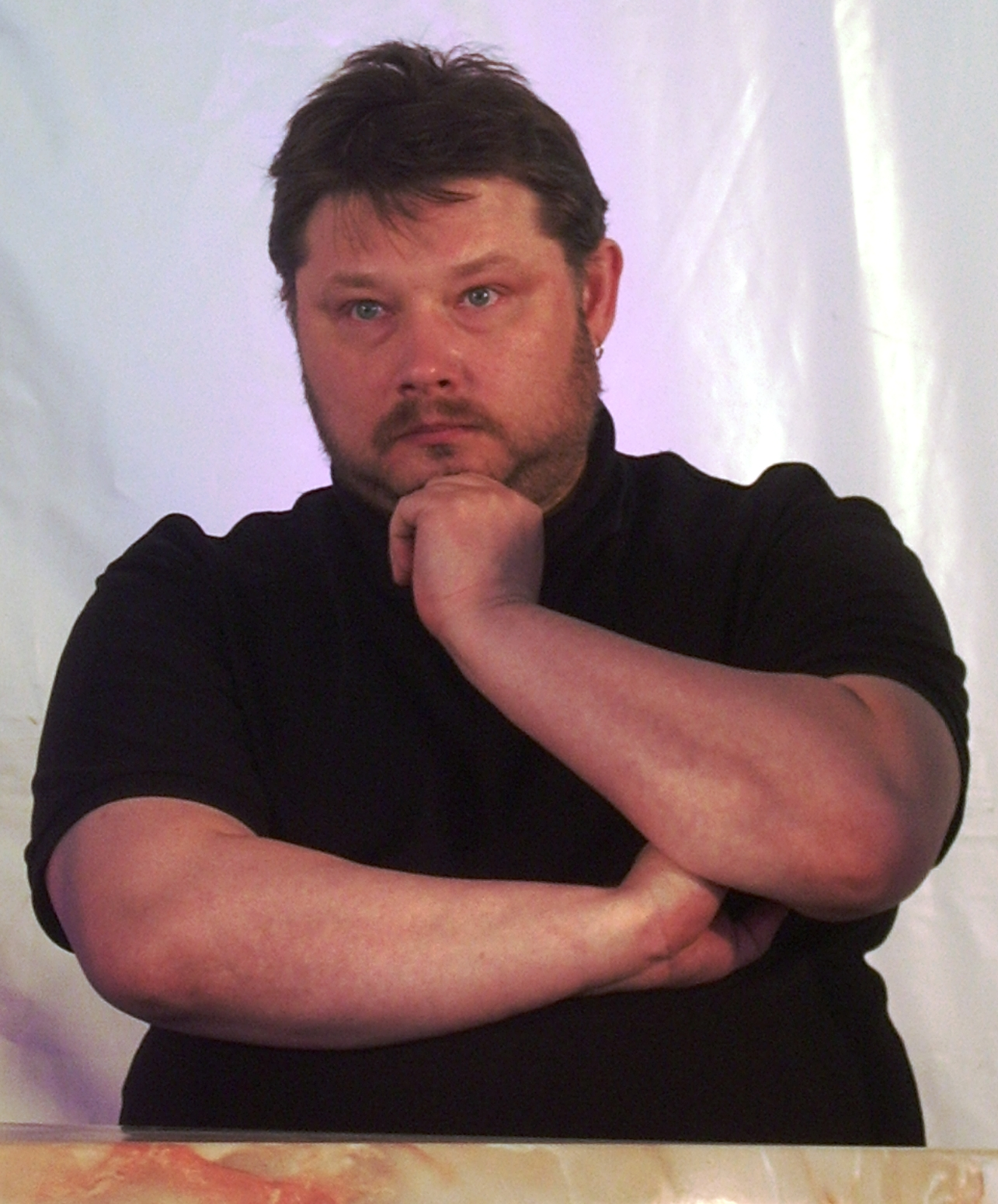
Indrek Hargla (2009)

Indrek Hargla (real name Indrek Sootak, born 12 July 1970), also known by his pseudonyms Andrei Golikov and Marat Faizijev, is an Estonian writer. He is one of the most prominent Estonian writers of science fiction and crime novels. His most notable work is the Apothecary Melchior series, set in medieval Tallinn.

Hargla was born in Tallinn. In 1993, he graduated from University of Tartu, having studied jurisprudence. After graduation, he worked at the Estonian Ministry of Foreign Affairs. Since 2012, he has been a professional writer.

He has won many awards, e.g. 17 times Estonian 'Stalker' science fiction prize.

== Works ==
- Apteeker Melchior ja Oleviste mõistatus. Tallinn: Varrak, 2010, 310 pp
- Apteeker Melchior ja Rataskaevu viirastus. Tallinn: Varrak, 2010, 286 pp
- Apteeker Melchior ja timuka tütar. Tallinn: Varrak, 2011, 431 pp
- Apteeker Melchior ja Pirita kägistaja. Tallinn: Varrak, 2013, 404 pp
- Apteeker Melchior ja Tallinna kroonika. Tallinn: Varrak, 2014, 469 pp
- Apteeker Melchior ja Gotlandi kurat. Pärnamäe: Raudhammas, 2017, 558 pp
- Apteeker Melchior ja Pilaatuse evangeelium. Pärnamäe: Raudhammas, 2019, 467 pp
