= University of Tartu Viljandi Culture Academy =

Academic institution in Estonia

- Tartu Ülikooli Viljandi Kultuuriakadeemia
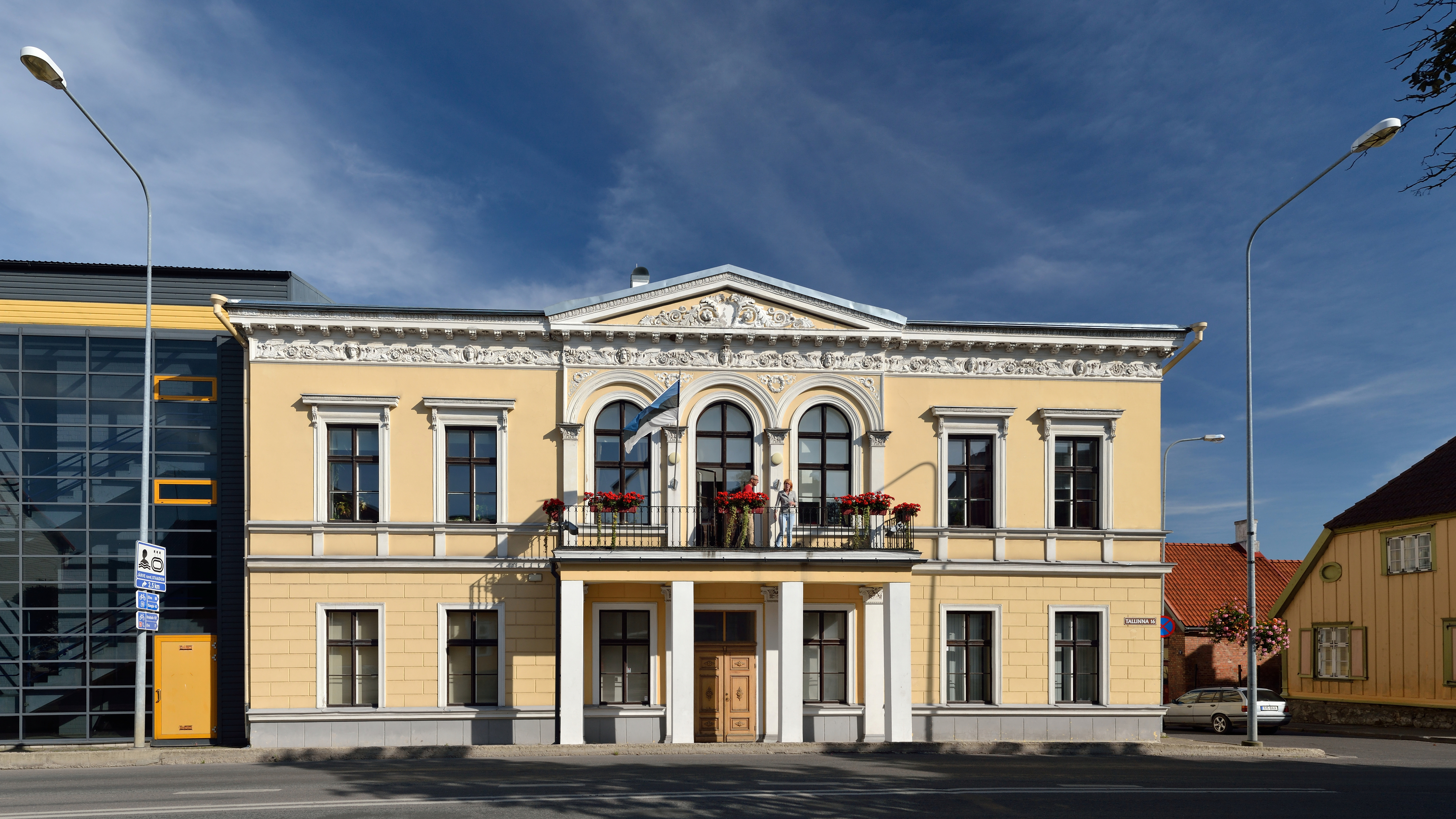
- Type: Public
- Established: 1952
- Students: 800 (2015)
- Location: Viljandi, Estonia; 58°21′59″N 25°35′50″E
- Website: http://www.kultuur.edu.ee

University of Tartu Viljandi Culture Academy (Estonian: Tartu Ülikooli Viljandi Kultuuriakadeemia) is an Estonian institution of higher education, situated in the provincial town of Viljandi, central Estonia. The UT Viljandi Culture Academy merged with the University of Tartu in 2005. The UT VCA has been teaching professional higher education and performing applied research within information science, culture education and creative arts since 1952. The academy has about 700 students, half of whom are open university students. The teaching and instruction are based on the continuity and sustainability of Estonian native culture enriched by new impulses which widen the notion of traditional culture.

== Education ==
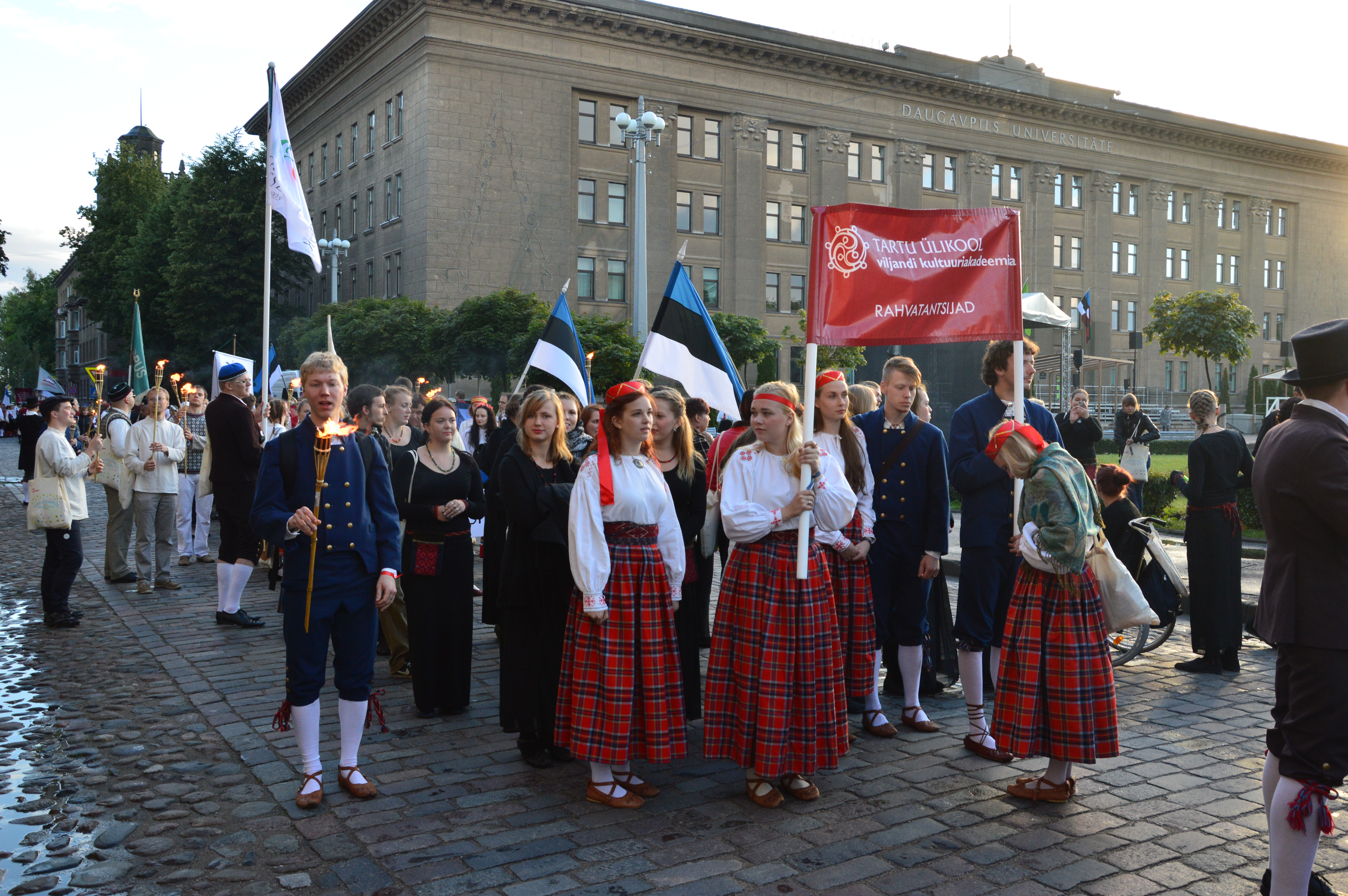
Viljandi Culture Academy students at Gaudeamus festival outside Daugavpils University.

The UT Viljandi Culture Academy offers undergraduate study programmes in such fields as performing arts, culture management, music, Estonian native crafts, community education and hobby activity.

The Academy also offers MA graduate study programmes in such fields as creative applications of cultural heritage, teacher of arts and technology, creative project management, and sound and visual technology.

== Research and creative studies ==
In the last decades, the UT VCA’s main area of research has been the humanities, but there is an increasing amount of cooperation with social, economic, technological and material sciences. The contemporary teaching methods within creative arts, non-formal education and education in arts and music are among the most covered applied research areas. The most remarkable development has taken place in the field of applied inherited crafts. In 2009 the Academy began publishing a series of academic publications, Studia Vernacula.

== International cooperation ==
There are also various international projects in which different departments from the academy are taking part. In addition, the academy also participates in the activities of several international university networks:

- AEC the European Association of Conservatoires.
- IASJ the International Association of Schools of Jazz.
- NORDTRAD a Nord Plus network of academies and universities in the Nordic and Baltic countries offering third level education in traditional music.
- NORTEAS a Nord Plus network for Nordic and Baltic Theatre and Dance Institutions of Higher Education.
- DAMA a Nord Plus network of Dance and Media Art Schools.
- NNME a Nordic Network for Music Education.
- NORDPULS a Nord Plus network of academies and universities in the Nordic and Baltic countries providing professional music training in the area of pop, jazz and related music genres.

UT VCA has signed bilateral co-operation agreement in the framework of the Erasmus+ programme with many universities (selection):

- (Austria) Konservatorium Wien University
- (Austria) University of Music and Performing Arts Graz
- (Finland) Helsinki Metropolia University of Applied Sciences
- (Finland) HUMAK University of Applied Sciences
- (Finland) Jyväskylä University of Applied Sciences
- (Finland) Kuopio Academy of Music and Dance
- (Finland) Mikkeli University of Applied Sciences
- (Finland) North Karelia University of Applied Sciences
- (Finland) Seinajoki University of Applied Sciences
- (Finland) Sibelius Academy
- Theatre Academy of Finland
- (Finland) Turku University of Applied Sciences, Arts Academy
- (Germany) Palucca School of Dance
- Iceland Academy of Arts
- (Lithuania) Vilniaus kolegija/University of Applied Sciences
- (Lithuania) Klaipeda University
- Art Academy of Latvia
- (Norway) Norwegian Academy of Music
- (Norway) Telemark University College
- (Portugal) Instituto Politecnico de Lisboa, Escola Superior de Dança
- (Sweden) Academy of Music and Drama University of Gothenburg
- (Sweden) Karlstad University, Ingesund College of Music
- (Sweden) Malmö Academy of Music, Lund University
- (Sweden) Royal College of Music in Stockholm
- (Turkey) Cumhuriyet University
- (United Kingdom) University of Chester

== History ==
In Tallinn in the year 1952, the Tallinn Culture School (est: Tallinna Kultuurharidusala Kool) – later the Tallinn School of Cultural Education (Tallinna Kultuurharidustöö Kool) was founded, where specialists are educated for libraries and community centres. By 1960, the school building in Tallinn has become too small and the Tallinn School of Cultural Education is transferred to Viljandi. In 1978, the school takes its new name, Viljandi Culture School (Viljandi Kultuurikool). In the autumn of 1991, the educational institution is reorganised into Viljandi Culture College (Viljandi Kultuurikolledž), providing applied higher education within different areas of culture. In 2003, the Viljandi Culture College becomes the Viljandi Culture Academy and in 2005 it joins the University of Tartu.

== Buildings ==
Main Building

The oldest part of the building was built in 1860 as a town-palace by count Theodor von Helmersen, the owner of Karula manor house in the north of Viljandi and was registered as a protected architectural monument in 1998.

Music House

The Music House of UT VCA was opened in December 2005. The building is home to the whole music department of the academy, including the chairs of traditional music, classical- and church-music, jazz music, and school music. The music house is of importance not only for the academy but for the whole city. The renovated building is situated in the heart of Viljandi city as well as the main building. Both buildings contribute to the idea of a culture district in the city centre. The Music house, Carl Robert Jakobson street 14, is located at the corner of Carl Robert Jakobson- and Lossi street, in the historical monument preservation zone of Viljandi's old town. The house was built in 1888 in historicist style as a two-storey stone dwelling house, which belonged in the beginning to the Viljandi governor of the Russian tsar, baron von Wolff. In 1917 the building hosted the Viljandi war-revolution committee. Later it was home to the staff of the Sakala partisan battalion and in soviet time it was used as a war-commissariat. After Estonia restored its independence in the beginning of the 1990s, the building was used as the Viljandi department of Estonia's state-defence. The building has been protected as an architectural monument since 1964.

Vilma house

In May 2012, the Culture Academy acquired the buildings of the former Viljandi bread factory. The building, known as Vilma, is located a few hundred meters from the main building, near Viljandi Market, at Turu Street 7.

The Vilma educational building houses a white box, a smithy, a wool workshop, a log workshop, a multimedia center, and auditoriums.

== Notable alumni ==
- Meelika Hainsoo (born 1979), folk musician
- Eeva Talsi (born 1988), folk musician

== See also ==
- Narva College of the University of Tartu
- Viljandi Folk Music Festival
