= Mari Lill =

Estonian actress (born 1945)

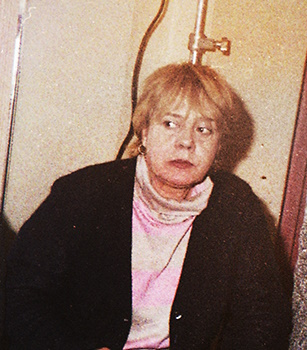
- Lill in 1996
- Born: 21 December 1945 (age 80); Tallinn, then part of Estonian SSR, Soviet Union
- Occupation: Actress
- Years active: 1968 – present
- Spouse: Tõnu Tamm (m. 1968)
- Children: 2, including Elisabet Reinsalu
- Relatives: Ivo Lill (brother)

Mari Lill (born 21 December 1945) is an Estonian stage, film and television actress whose career began onstage in the late 1960s.

== Early life and education ==
Mari Lill was born in Tallinn to Felix Lill and Asta Lill (née Multer) just after the end of World War II and the Soviet occupation and annexation of Estonia. Her father Felix was arrested by Soviet authorities and spent several years sentenced to forced labor in the gulag system in Siberia when she was still an infant. He was later able to return to the family when Mari was quite young. Lill is the middle child of three siblings; she has an older sister Kadri, and her younger brother was glass artist Ivo Lill. Lill grew up and attended schools in the district of Nõmme and spent time visiting her grandmother on the island of Saaremaa.

After graduating from secondary school, Lill studied acting under the supervision of course instructor Voldemar Panso at the Tallinn State Conservatory (now, the Estonian Academy of Music and Theatre). Her diploma production was in the role of Helen Keller in a 1967 staging of William Gibson's The Miracle Worker. She graduated in 1968. Among her graduating classmates were actors Helle-Reet Helenurm, Ago Roo, Katrin Karisma, Raivo Trass, Enn Klooren, Jaan Tooming, Peeter Jakobi, and Kalju Komissarov.

== Stage career ==
In 1968, following her graduation from the Tallinn State Conservatory, she joined the Estonian Soviet Socialist Republic National Youth Theatre in Tallinn (now, the Tallinn City Theatre). Her first significant role at the Youth Theatre was in the role of Hedvig in a production of Henrik Ibsen's 1884 play The Wild Duck. Lill remained with the Youth Theatre for nine years, leaving in 1977. Prominent roles during her time at the Youth Theatre include those in works by such playwrights and authors as: Shakespeare, A. H. Tammsaare, Henrik Ibsen, N. Richard Nash, Andrus Kivirähk, and Anton Chekhov, among others.

In 1977, Mari Lill began performing at the Estonian Drama Theatre in Tallinn, where she is still currently engaged as an actress. Lill's stage career with the Estonian Drama Theatre has been prolific; performing in over seventy theatre roles. Some of her more memorable roles have been in productions of works by such varied international authors and playwrights as: Shakespeare, Ibsen, Molière, Valentin Rasputin, J. M. Barrie, Edward Bond, Leonid Andreyev, Leo Tolstoy, Eugene O'Neill, Clare Boothe Luce, Isaac Babel, Marsha Norman, Françoise Sagan, Albert Camus, Yukio Mishima, Ray Cooney, Ödön von Horvath, Astrid Lindgren, Frank Marcus, Tankred Dorst, Joseph Kesselring, Terry Pratchett, Wilkie Collins, Juan Rulfo, Antti Tuuri, Arthur Miller, and Yasmina Reza, among many others. Memorable roles in works by Estonian authors and playwrights include those of: Madis Kõiv, A. H. Tammsaare, Vaino Vahing, Mart Kivastik, Urmas Lennuk, Andrus Kivirähk, Oskar Luts, Eduard Vilde, Mats Traat, Jaan Kruusvall, and Jaan Kross, among several others.

== Television career ==
In 1990, Mari Lill appeared in the Sulev Keedus directed feature-length television drama Ainus pühapäev. This was followed the next year by the role of Maile in the Tõnis Kask directed television melodrama film Vana mees tahab koju, based on the 1983 novel of the same name by Raimond Kaugver. In 1995, she played the role of Mrs. Laasik in the ETV drama mini-series Wikmani poised, which was based on the 1988 novel of the same name by Jaan Kross.

Lill has also made appearances in a number of roles on Estonian television series, including; the popular, long-running ETV drama series Õnne 13 in 1995; the ETV crime drama Ohtlik lend in 2006; the Kanal 2 mystery-horror serial Süvahavva in 2012; the ETV political satire series Riigimehed in 2013; the Kanal 2 crime drama Viimane võmm; the TV3 serial Üheotsapilet in 2016; and several episodes of the popular TV3 comedy-crime series Kättemaksukontor in 2016.

== Film career ==
In 1977, Lill made her feature film debut in the Kaljo Kiisk directed drama Surma hinda küsi surnutelt for Tallinnfilm.

Following this role, she returned to the stage and did not make another film appearance until the role of Robi's mother in the 1985 Leida Laius and Arvo Iho directed drama Naerata ometi, which chronicles the turbulent life of a teenage girl in a Soviet orphanage. The film was based on the 1963 Silvia Rannamaa penned novel Kasuema. In 1989, she would appear in two film roles: as Asta in the Leida Laius directed drama Varastatud kohtumine, as well as in the Jaan Kolberg directed short Mardipäev, both for Tallinnfilm.

In 1990, she made an appearance in Uzbek director Khadzhi Akhmar's Russian language Soviet science-fiction film Sputnik planety Uran for Uzbekfilm, which featured a multi-ethnic cast of Russian, Uzbek, Estonian, Kazakh, Georgian and Ukrainian actors. In 1992, Lill appeared in a small role in the Aare Tilk directed family drama Tule tagasi, Lumumba, based on the Toomas Raudam story Lugu Reinust. In 1994, she appeared in the Jaan Kolberg directed adventure period piece Jüri Rumm, based on the real-life exploits of the 19th-century Estonian folk hero, thief and outlaw Rummu Jüri.

Mari Lill would spend much of the late 1990s and early 2000s in the theatre. She would resume her film career in 2007, with a small role in the Veiko Õunpuu black comedy Sügisball. In 2012, she would lend her voice to the Priit Tender animated film short Ussinuumaja produced by Eesti Joonisfilm. In 2016, she appeared in the René Vilbre directed Taska Film comedy Klassikokkutulek and the following year in the Sulev Keedus directed drama Mehetapja/Süütu /Vari. In 2020, he had a starring role as Grandmother in the Rasmus Merivoo directed dark comedy-fantasy film Kratt.

Throughout her film career, Lill would also appear in a number of short films and student films.

== Personal life ==
In 1968, Mari Lill married actor Tõnu Tamm. The couple have two daughters, pediatrician Katariina Rebane (b. 1974), and actress Elisabet Reinsalu (b. 1976). They currently live in the small village of Andineeme in Kuusalu Parish, Harju County.

== Acknowledgements ==
- Order of the White Star, V Class (2002)
- Merited Artist of the Estonian SSR (1975)
