= Ellen Kaarma =

Estonian actress

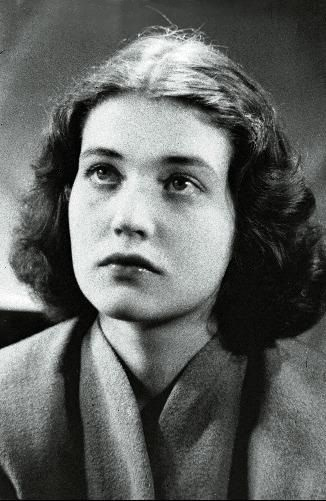
- Born: 2 January 1928; Tartu, Estonia
- Died: 4 June 1973 (aged 45); Tartu, then part of Estonian SSR, Soviet Union
- Other name: Ellen Kilgas
- Occupation: Actress
- Years active: 1949–1971
- Spouse: Gunnar Kilgas (1950 – 1952; divorced)
- Partner: Lembit Mägedi
- Children: Tõnu Kilgas (1954–2021)
- Relatives: Hedvig Hanson (granddaughter); Piret Krumm (granddaughter)

Ellen Kaarma (2 January 1928 – 4 July 1973) was an Estonian stage and film actress.

== Early life and education ==
Ellen Kaarma was born in Tartu, the only child from the marriage of accountant Artur Kaarma and Elisabeth Kaarma (née Kutsar). Her mother died when she was thirteen. She had two younger half-siblings from her father's second marriage; Jaak Kaarma (born 1943), who became a publisher and was a former Estonian Soviet Socialist Republic communist party politician; and a half-sister, Krista, who died in infancy. Kaarma attended Tallinn 8th Secondary School, graduating in 1944 while Estonia was under German occupation during World War II.

In 1946 Kaarma began studying drama at the now defunct Estonian State Theatre Institute in Tallinn, graduating in 1949. Among her graduating classmates were actors Jüri Järvet, Heikki Haravee, Ellen Alaküla and future husband Gunnar Kilgas.

== Stage and film career ==
Following graduation, Kaarma was engaged at the South Estonia Theatre in Võru with most of her graduating classmates from the Estonian State Theatre Institute. Kaarma's stage debut was as Viola, in William Shakespeare's Twelfth Night in 1949. However, the theatre was poorly funded and closed in 1951 after only two years of operation.

In 1951, Kaarma began a tumultuous engagement at Tartu's Vanemuine theatre, where she performed in roles in works by such varied authors and playwrights as Honoré de Balzac, Leo Tolstoy, Bertolt Brecht and Anton Chekhov, among others, throughout her career with the theatre. At the time, the Vanemuine was under the direction of actor and stage pedagogue Kaarel Ird. Although praised for her ability as an actress, Kaarma's relationship with Ird was turbulent and the two were frequently at odds with one another and mired in personal and professional disputes. At one point, during the late 1950s, Kaarma was offered an engagement at the Estonian Drama Theatre in Tallinn by theatre director Ilmar Tammur. However, Ird refused to grant Kaarma permission to leave the Vanemuine. Kaarma's final appearance onstage at the Vanemuine was a role in the production of the Hugo Raudsepp comedic play Vedelvorst in 1967.

In 1957, Kaarma was cast as Salme in the Aleksandr Mandrõkin directed black-and-white feature film drama Pöördel for Tallinna Kinostuudio. The film centered around a communist party official, portrayed by Kaarma's former husband Gunnar Kilgas, who is sent to revive the faltering productivity of a collective farm. This was Kaarma's biggest film role. In 1971, she had a small role in the Kalju Komissarov directed drama film Metskapten, starring former Estonian State Theatre Institute classmate Jüri Järvet.

== Alcoholism and death ==
It was during her years at the Vanemuine that Kaarma began drinking heavily and later progressed to late stage alcoholism. In 1967, Kaarma was fired from the Vanemuine by Kaarel Ird due to her excessive drinking. Although the two had never gotten along professionally or personally, Ird later told Kaarma's half-brother Jaak that he would consider letting Kaarma return to the theatre if she was able to remain sober. However, by 1968, Kaarma was unwilling or unable to control her drinking and never returned to the stage.

Following her departure from the Vanemuine theatre, Kaarma's alcoholism spiraled further out of control. In mid-June 1973, she was forcibly hospitalized. On 3 July 1973, she escaped from the hospital through a first-floor window wearing only a hospital gown and fled to the apartment she had shared with her then 18-year-old son Tõnu in Tartu. The following evening, Kaarma began drinking at a friend's apartment on Vallikraavi Street when she succumbed to what was officially recorded as a stroke at age 45. In 2011, while Kaarma's granddaughter Hedvig Hanson was doing research on Kaarma, a neighbor revealed that the night of her death, Kaarma had received a severe blow to the head; possibly delivered by one of the people in the apartment that she had been drinking with.

Kaarma was buried at Viljandi Forest Cemetery, next to her father.

== Personal life and legacy ==
Ellen Kaarma was married to actor Gunnar Kilgas from 1950 until 1952. Before their marriage ended, Kaarma began a relationship with actor and former soldier Lembit Mägedi. Mägedi and Kaarma had a son, Tõnu, in 1954. Tõnu took his mother's married name Kilgas and become an actor and singer. Kaarma's granddaughters include jazz singer Hedvig Hanson and actress Piret Krumm.

In 2011, Hedvig Hanson found several diaries belonging to Kaarma in her father's basement. These eventually provided the foundation of a biography Hanson wrote in 2012 titled Jutustamata lugu: Vanemuise näitleja Ellen Kaarma (1928–1973) (English: The Untold Story: Vanemuine Actress Ellen Kaarma (1928–1973)), published by Tänapäev.

== Selected Vanemuine theatre roles ==
- Zoya, Margarita Aliger's Tale about Truth (1951)
- Anda, Rainis' Blow, Wind! (1952)
- Pauline, Honoré de Balzac's Stepmother (1952)
- Tanya, Aleksei Arbuzov's Tanja (1953)
- Linda Eriste, Hella Wuolijoki's The Burning Land (1955)
- Kira, Leonid Leonov's Common Man (1955)
- Liida, Alexander Korneitšuk's Wings (1956)
- Olli, Liidia Kompus' Exams (1957)
- Mari-Elts, Egon Rannet's Heartache (1957)
- Svea Lokke, Ardi Liives' Robert the Great (1957)
- Annela, Ardi Liives' New Year's Night (1958)
- Annunziata, Evgeny Schwartz's The Shadow (1959)
- Nina Mikhailovna Zarechnaya, Anton Chekhov's The Seagull (1959)
- Liza, Leo Tolstoy's The Living Corpse (1960)
- Valya, Aleksei Arbuzov's Irkutsk Story (1960)
- Virginia, Bertolt Brecht's Life of Galileo (1961)
- Masha, Alexander Stein's The Ocean (1961)
- Sofia, Alexander Griboyedov's Woe from Wit (1963)
- Regina Engstrand, Henrik Ibsen's Ghosts (1965)
- Asya, Alexander Stein's The Widower (1966)
