= Tõnu Kilgas =

Estonian actor (1954–2021)

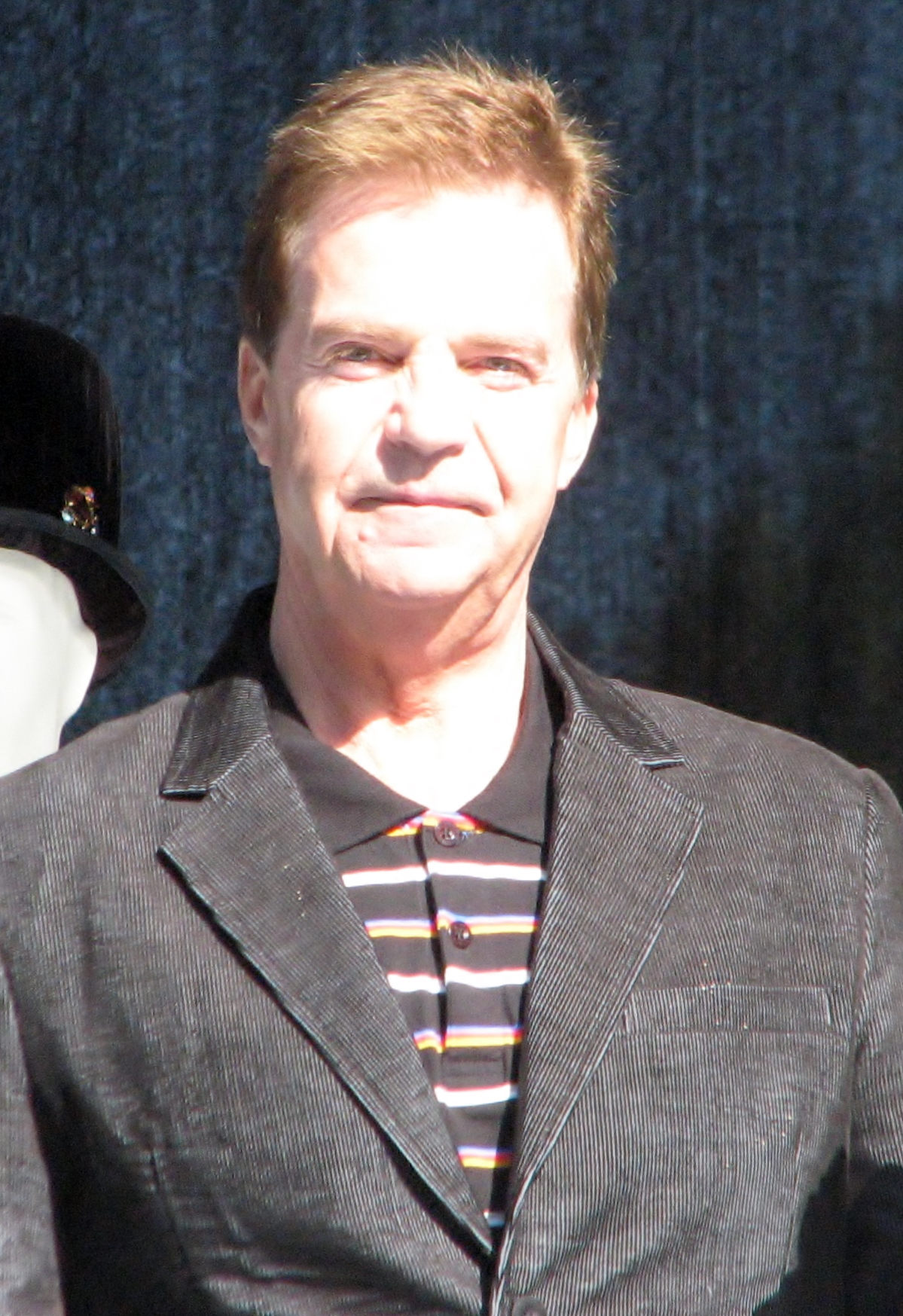
- Born: August 13, 1954; Tartu, then part of Estonian SSR, Soviet Union
- Died: May 25, 2021 (aged 66); Tallinn, Estonia
- Resting place: Metsakalmistu, Tallinn
- Occupations: Singer, Actor
- Years active: 1976–2021
- Spouse(s): Novella Hanson (divorced); Tatjana Bassova (divorced)
- Partners: Katrin Karisma
- Children: 4, including Hedvig Hanson and Piret Krumm
- Parent(s): Ellen Kaarma; Lembit Mägedi

Tõnu Kilgas (13 August 1954 – 25 May 2021) was an Estonian singer (baritone) and stage, film, voice, and television actor.

== Early life and education ==
Tõnu Kilgas was born in Tartu, the only child of Vanemuine theatre actors Lembit Mägedi and Ellen Kaarma. His parents were in a long-term relationship but not married and he took his mother's surname from her earlier marriage to actor Gunnar Kilgas. Both parents were largely absent from Kilgas' life during his childhood and he was primarily raised by his aunt. His mother battled alcoholism and died in 1973 when Kilgas was eighteen. Kilgas attended Tartu 3rd Secondary School (currently Tartu Raatuse School) and the Heino Eller Tartu Music School, graduating in 1977.

== Career ==
=== Rock singer ===
Before joining the stage as an actor, Kilgas performed as a singer with the Estonian rock ensemble Fix from 1972 until 1974. The band released a large number of successful singles and albums. The band also included Kilgas' first wife, singer Novella Hanson.

=== Stage ===
Kilgas began an engagement at the Vanemuine theatre in Tartu in 1976 that lasted until 1984, when he joined the Estonian National Opera where he performed in acting roles as well as a soloist in operas, stage musicals, operettas, and concerts. His career at the Estonian National Opera lasted until 2005 and afterward he became a freelance singer and actor. Additionally, he has performed as both a singer and actor in roles at the Vanalinnastuudio, the Estonian Drama Theatre, the Endla Theatre, the Tartu Hansa Theatre, Old Baskin's Theater, and the Kell Kümme Theatre. Kilgas has also performed onstage in operas in the United States, United Kingdom, Germany, the Netherlands, and Denmark.

Some of Kilgas' more memorable roles have been in stage productions of works by such composers and lyricists as: Emmerich Kálmán, John Kander, Paul Abraham, Jerry Herman, Franz Lehár, Eduard Tubin, Cole Porter, Johann Strauss, Jule Styne, Arthur Sullivan, Franz Schubert, and Heinrich Berté.

=== Film ===
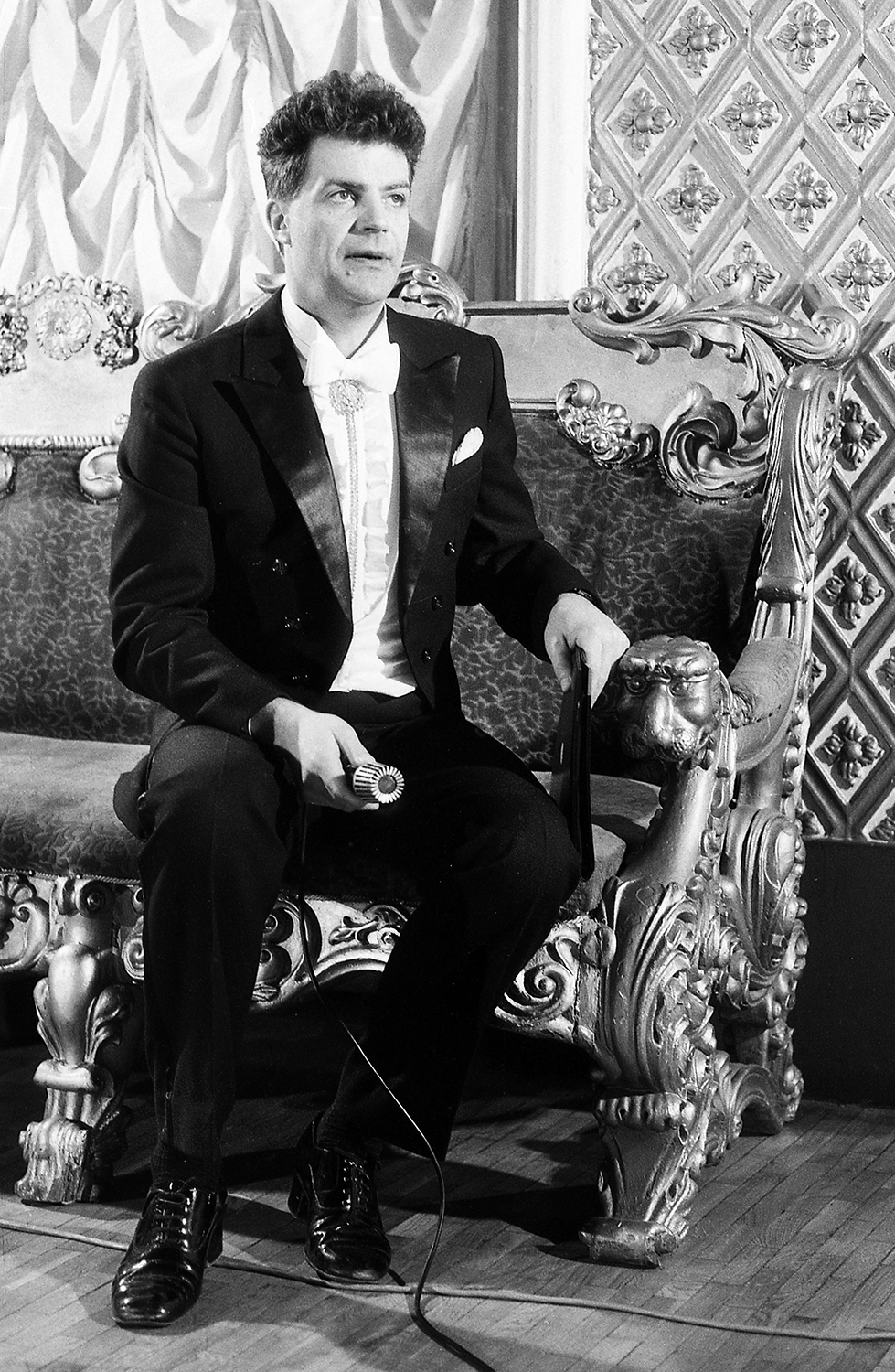
Kilgas in 1990

Kilgas' first major film role was as Father in the 1989 Peeter Simm directed historical drama film Inimene, keda polnud, which chronicles the life of a young Estonian singer and actress named Imbi (played by Katri Horma) from the 1930s until the March 1949 deportations of Estonian citizens to inhospitable areas of the USSR by Soviet authorities. In 1991, he appeared as Kuno in the Eino Baskin directed Tallinnfilm drama Rahu tänav, starring Mikk Mikiver and Jüri Järvet. The following year, he appeared as Leo in the Mati Põldre directed biographical period drama Need vanad armastuskirjad for Freya Film about the life of Estonian musician and lyricist Raimond Valgre (played by Rain Simmul) during the 1930s and 1940s and following the banning of his works in 1948 by Soviet authorities.

In 2007, Kilgas returned to the screen to play the spirit of legendary Estonian singer and actor Georg Ots in the Andres Maimik and Rain Tolk directed Kuukulgur Film road movie comedy Jan Uuspõld läheb Tartusse; a film that portrays Estonian actor and singer Jan Uuspõld as a down-on-his-luck caricature of himself trying to hitchhike from Tallinn to Tartu to perform in a role at the Vanemuine theatre.

Tõnu Kilgas has also worked as a voice actor, most notably dubbing foreign animated films into the Estonian language. These include characters in the 2008 Walt Disney Studios Motion Pictures animated science fiction comedy film WALL-E and the DreamWorks Animation Kung Fu Panda franchise, among others.

=== Television ===
Kilgas' first major part in television film was a starring role as Lembit Savikas in the 1978 Peeter Simm directed comedy film Stereo, about a young veterinarian who arrives at a collective farm, only to be initially met with apprehension from the villagers. The film, however, was not permitted to be released by Soviet authorities and was only eventually shown on Estonian television in 1991, after Estonia regained independence from the Soviet Union.

In 1981, Kilgas appeared as Ilya Fruntov in the Tõnis Kask directed two-part television film Kaks päeva Viktor Kingissepa elust; a biopic of Estonian communist politician Viktor Kingissepp.

For many Estonians, Kilgas is possibly best known for his role of Harry Ahven on the popular, long-running Eesti Televisioon (ETV) drama serial Õnne 13. Kilgas had been a regular cast member of the series since it first aired in 1993, leaving the series in 2020 due to illness.

== Personal life and death ==
Tõnu Kilgas was first married to singer and music teacher Novella Hanson; the couple have one daughter, jazz singer Hedvig Hanson. His second marriage was to Russian-born dancer, actress, and choreographer Tatjana Bassova; the union produced one daughter, Ellen Kilgas. After his divorce from Bassova, he began a long-term relationship with actress and singer Katrin Karisma; the couple had one daughter, actress Piret Krumm. Kilgas and Karisma ended their relationship in 2007. Kilgas' youngest child is daughter Susan, a cancer researcher, from a relationship with travel writer and photographer Lembe Mõttus.

Kilgas has openly discussed his past alcohol and gambling addictions. In 2004, at age fifty, he stopped drinking and gambling, as well as quitting cigarette smoking.

In 2011, Kilgas' daughter Hedvig Hanson found several diaries belonging to Kilgas' mother Ellen Kaarma in his basement. These would eventually provide the foundation of a biography Hanson would write about Kaarma in 2012 titled The Untold Story: Vanemuine Actress Ellen Kaarma (1928–1973), published by Tänapäev.

Tõnu Kilgas resided primarily in Tallinn, with additional time spent in summer homes in rural Estonia.

Kilgas died on 25 May 2021, aged 66, after undergoing treatment for lung cancer that had metastasized to his brain. He was interred next to his father at Forest Cemetery in the Tallinn district of Pirita.
