= Katrin Pärn =

Estonian actress and singer

- Born: 20 May 1977 (age 49); Tallinn, then part of Estonian SSR, Soviet Union
- Occupations: Actress, director, singer
- Years active: 2000 – present
- Children: 2
- Parent(s): Eino Baskin, Malle Pärn

Katrin Pärn (born 20 May 1977) is an Estonian stage, film and television actress and singer.

== Early life and education ==
Katrin Pärn was born in Tallinn to actor, theatre founder, and director Eino Baskin (1929–2015) and actress and politician Malle Pärn (born 1945). She had one older half-brother, actor Roman Baskin (1954–2018), from her father's first marriage to actress Ita Ever. She attended primary and secondary schools in Tallinn before enrolling at the EMA Higher Drama School (now, the Estonian Academy of Music and Theatre), graduating in 2000 under the direction of Ingo Normet. In 2008, she received a master's degree in the dramatic arts from the Estonian Academy of Music and Theatre. She has also lived and studied abroad in the United States, New Zealand and Germany.

== Stage career ==
From 2000 to 2008 Pärn was engaged as at the Vanemuine theatre in Tartu where she performed in roles as both an actress and in musical productions. Some of her more memorable roles at the Vanemuine include: Peemont, in a production of Mikhail Bulgakov's The Master and Margarita; Linda, in Willy Russell's Blood Brothers; Abigail Williams, in Arthur Miller's The Crucible; Rebecca, in Gabriel García Márquez's One Hundred Years of Solitude; and Lora, in Vaino Vahing's Stars in a Morning Sky. In 2010, Katrin Pärn appeared at the Tartu New Theatre in a production of the Ivar Põllu penned and directed Ird, K., about controversial Estonian theatre actor and stage pedagogue Kaarel Ird. For her performance, Pärn would be nominated for Best Actress by the Estonian Theatre Union.

== Television and film career ==
Katrin Pärn made her television debut as an actress in 2007 on an episode of the Eesti Televisioon (ETV) crime-drama series Ohtlik lend. She would go on to make appearances in several popular Estonian series such as the Kanal 2 crime-drama Kelgukoerad in 2010; the Kanal 2 crime-drama Viimane võmm in 2014; and the Kanal 2 drama Restart in 2015.

In 2016, Pärn made her feature-length film debut in a supporting role as Maret in the Mart Kivastik directed comedy-drama Õnn tuleb magades for Kopli Kinokompanii and Vintage Pictures, starring Katariina Unt and Ivo Uukkivi. The following year, she appeared as Ode in the Sulev Keedus directed drama film Mehetapja/Süütu/Vari (The Manslayer/The Virgin/The Shadow).

== Music career ==
Apart from acting, Pärn is also the lead vocalist of the folk-pop band Külm Mai. The band has released one album, Igasugused, in 2006.

== Personal life ==
Katrin Parn is in a long-term relationship with partner Kaur Mägi. They have two sons.
