= Ellen Alaküla =

Estonian actress

- Born: 30 April 1927; Kohtla-Järve, Estonia
- Died: 15 January 2011 (aged 83); Tallinn, Estonia
- Other names: Ellen Alumäe; Ellen Roots; Ellen Liivaku
- Occupation: Actress
- Years active: 1946–2002
- Spouses: Leo Alumäe (m. 1950; div. 1970) Otto Roots (m. 1984; died 1994) Uno Liivaku (m. 2006)
- Children: 1

Ellen Alaküla (30 April 1927 – 15 January 2011) was an Estonian stage, radio, television, and film actress and theatre teacher whose career spanned over forty years.

== Early life and education ==
Ellen Alaküla was born in Kohtla-Järve in Ida-Viru County to parents Rudolf Alaküla and Johanna Alaküla (née Lukner). She was one of three siblings; having a brother and a sister. The family moved to Tallinn when she was young. Her father was a stage actor and sang in the church choir and her mother was a homemaker. Her father was later deported to Siberia by Soviet authorities, but was eventually allowed to return to Estonia.

Alaküla attended schools in Tallinn; she graduating from secondary school at the Tallinn 5th School. In 1946 and began studying acting and theatre at the now defunct Estonian State Theatre Institute in Tallinn, graduating in 1949. Stage and film actors Gunnar Kilgas, Jüri Järvet, Heikki Haravee and Ellen Kaarma were among her classmates.

== Career in the theatre ==
In 1946, while still a student, Ellen Alaküla would be engaged as an actress at the National Drama Theatre in Tallinn (now, the Estonian Drama Theatre). She would have two more engagements at the theatre: from 1950 until 1953, and from 1984 until 1989. In 1949, following graduation, Alaküla spent a year engaged at the South Estonia Theatre in Võru with most of her graduating classmates from the Estonian State Theatre Institute in Tallinn. From 1958 until 1967, she was engaged at the Lydia Koidula Pärnu Drama Theatre (now, the Endla Theatre).

Throughout her long career as a stage actress, she had performed in roles in works by such varied international authors and playwrights as: Shakespeare, Nikolai Pogodin, Lion Feuchtwanger, Nâzım Hikmet, George Bernard Shaw, Victor Hugo, and Leo Tolstoy, among others. Memorable roles in works by Estonian authors and playwrights include those of: August Kitzberg, Eino Alt, A. H. Tammsaare, Egon Rannet, Enn Vetemaa, and Hugo Raudsepp.

Between 1954 and 1958, Alaküla taught drama and arts and cultural management at the Tallinn School of Cultural Education (now, University of Tartu Viljandi Culture Academy). Between 1975 and 1980, she taught elocution at the Tallinn Pedagogical University, and from 1983 and 1990, she taught elocution to students at the Tallinn 20th Secondary School (now, Tallinn Gymnasium). Later, she worked in student administration at the Estonian Management Institute and Tallinn University of Technology.

== Film, television and radio career ==
In 1970, Ellen Alaküla made her feature-length film debut as the character Ulla in the Kalju Komissarov directed Soviet-Estonian thriller Valge laev for Tallinnfilm. This was followed by the role of the wife of the villainous Baron von Üxküll in the 1972 Madis Ojamaa directed historical fiction-adventure film Verekivi, again for Tallinnfilm. The next year, she appeared in the Valdur Himbek directed Tuli öös, a story about children caught between danger and doing what is noble during the German occupation of Estonia. The film was based on the 1967 Eno Raud children's story Tuli pimendatud linnas.

In 1976, Alaküla had a small role in the Veljo Käsper directed melodrama Aeg elada, aeg armastada. This was followed by another small role in the 1981 Arvo Kruusement film adaptation of the 1938 August Gailit novel Karge meri. Her final feature film appearance was in the 1988 drama Ma pole turist, ma elan siin, directed by Peeter Urbla.

In addition to feature films, Alaküla has also appeared several television films, including; 1975's Aeg maha!, a drama directed by Tõnis Kask and Ben Drui; and the 1978 comedy film Siin me oleme, directed by Sulev Nõmmik and based on writer Juhan Smuul's 1968 monologue Suvitajad. Both television films were made for Eesti Telefilm. In 1983, she appeared in a small role in the ETV adaptation of the 1912 Eduard Vilde novel Tabamata ime. Her last television appearance was in a 2002 episode of the popular, long-running ETV drama series Õnne 13.

Throughout her years as an actress, Alaküla has also appeared in a number of radio plays; one of her most memorable performances being the role of Marie Antoinette in a production of Lion Feuchtwanger's The Widow Capet in 1961.

== Personal life ==
Ellen Alaküla was married three times. Her first marriage was to Leo Alumäe in 1950. The couple had a daughter who would become a mathematician. However, they would divorce in 1970. Her second marriage was to engineer and lyricist Otto Roots. Roots died in 1994 while still married to Alaküla. Her third marriage was in 2006, to longtime friend Uno Liivaku and lasted until Alaküla's death in 2011 at age 83. She was buried in Tallinn's Metsakalmistu cemetery.
