= Sisask =

Family name

Sisask is an Estonian surname. Notable people with the surname include:

- Siiri Sisask (born 1968), Estonian singer, actress, and politician
- Urmas Sisask (1960–2022), Estonian composer
