= Vana daami visiit =

2006 film directed by Roman Baskin

- Directed by: Roman Baskin
- Written by: Friedrich Dürrenmatt (play); Ilmar Raag (screenplay); Roman Baskin (screenplay)
- Produced by: Andres Arro; Roman Baskin; Kaspar Kaljas; Peeter Urbla
- Starring: Ita Ever
- Cinematography: Janno-Hans Arro
- Edited by: Tambet Tasuja; Maarek Toompere
- Music by: Olav Ehala
- Distributed by: Eesti Televisioon (ETV); Exitfilm; MTÜ Kell Kümme
- Release date: 6 April 2006
- Running time: 99 minutes
- Country: Estonia
- Language: Estonian

Vana daami visiit (English: The Visit of the Old Lady) is a 2006 Estonian film directed by Roman Baskin and based on the 1956 play The Visit by Friedrich Dürrenmatt.

== Cast ==
- Ita Ever as Claire Zachanassian
- Hannes Kaljujärv as Citizen
- Feliks Kark as Citizen
- Indrek Taalmaa as Citizen
- Arvo Kukumägi as Citizen
- Hendrik Toompere Jr. as Artist
- Jaanus Orgulas as Stationmaster
- Raivo Trass as Mayor
- Aarne Üksküla as Alfred III
- Leila Säälik as Mathilde III
- Ain Lutsepp as Minister
- Aleksander Eelmaa as Gymnasium director
- Rain Simmul as Train conductor
- Lembit Eelmäe as Butler Boby
- Eino Baskin as Claire's spouse Moby
- Marko Matvere as Bodyguard Roby
- Üllar Saaremäe as Bodyguard Toby
- Tõnu Kark as Police Chief
- Kaljo Kiisk as Doctor
- Tõnu Aav as Koby
- Peeter Jakobi as Loby
- Ester Pajusoo as Citizen's wife
- Maria Klenskaja as Citizen's wife
- Ülle Kaljuste as Citizen's wife
- Elisabet Reinsalu as Ottilie
- Gert Raudsep as Karl
- Epp Eespäev as Luise
- Arvo Kruusement as Claire's bodyguard
- Rein Oja as Journalist
- Aivar Tommingas as Journalist
