= Helle-Reet Helenurm =

Estonian actress (1944–2003)

- Born: 26 January 1944; Paide, then part of Generalbezirk Estland, Reichskomissariat Ostland
- Died: 23 February 2003 (aged 59); Tallinn, Estonia
- Occupation: Actress
- Years active: 1968–2003
- Spouse: Kalju Komissarov (m. 1967; div. 1971)
- Children: 1

Helle-Reet Helenurm (26 January 1944 – 23 February 2003) was an Estonian actress whose career began in 1968 in theatre. She also performed as a radio, television, and film actress until her death, aged 59, of cancer.

== Early life and education ==
Helle-Reet Helenurm was born in the town of Paide in Järva County, the only child of Udo and Ilse Helenurm (née Petron), during the German occupation of Estonia in World War II. Following the reoccupation of Estonia by the Soviet Union in 1944, when she was just several months old, her father fled the country and settled in Germany and she was raised solely by her mother, who worked as an accountant. She knew little about her father until she was a teenager and didn't meet him until later in life. After establishing contact with him, the two subsequently remained in touch with one another until her death in 2003.

Helenurm graduated from secondary school in Paide in 1962 and studied English and music at the Tallinn Pedagogical Institute (now, Tallinn University) from 1962 until 1964, when she enrolled in the Tallinn State Conservatory's Performing Arts Department (now, the Estonian Academy of Music and Theatre) to study under course supervisor Voldemar Panso, graduating in 1968. Among her graduating classmates were actors Mari Lill, Katrin Karisma, Ago Roo, Raivo Trass, Enn Klooren, Jaan Tooming, Peeter Jakobi, and Kalju Komissarov. Helenurm and Komissarov would marry in 1967, while both were still students at the institution.

== Career ==
Following her graduation from the Tallinn State Conservatory in 1968, Helenurm began a long engagement as an actress at the Estonian Drama Theatre in Tallinn. She was employed at theatre for twenty-six years before departing in 1994 when she joined the Vanalinnastuudio in Tallinn, where she remained a year, ending her engagement in 1995. Afterward, she had a short engagement at the Tallinn City Theatre and then worked as a freelance actress. During her years on the stages of Estonian theatres, she would appear in notable productions of works by such varied foreign authors and playwrights as: Peter Shaffer, Friedrich Schiller, Aleksei Arbuzov, Maxim Gorky, Grigori Gorin, Imre Kertész, Jerome Kilty, Neil Simon, Leo Fall, Jean Anouilh, and Guy de Maupassant. Notable stage roles in productions of works by Estonian authors and playwrights include the works of: Jaan Kruusvall, August Kitzberg, A. H. Tammsaare, Juhan Smuul, and Hugo Raudsepp.

Helenurm also had a long career as a voice actress on radio, where she performed in a number of dramas and serials and participated in the long-running Eesti Raadio program Meelejahutaja. She also recorded a number of audiobooks.

In 1974, she garnered critical praise for her role as Mrs. Erlynne in a televised stage production of Oscar Wilde's Lady Windermere's Fan, which was directed by former Tallinn State Conservatory classmate Raivo Trass and broadcast on Eesti Televisioon (ETV). In 1975, she had her first substantial role in a television film as Riina in the Tõnis Kask and Ben Drui-directed drama Aeg maha!, broadcast on ETV. This was followed by a small role in the television drama film Õnnelind flamingo in 1986, again, directed by Tõnis Kask, and based on the 1984 novel Meie pole süüdi by Estonian author Raimond Kaugver. Helenurm also appeared in a number of roles in Estonian television series and sketch shows. She is possibly best recalled by the television-viewing public for her role as Malle Nurm in the long-running ETV drama series Õnne 13. Helenurm joined the cast in 1993, the first year that the series began airing, and left the series just prior to her death in 2003. As well as stage, radio, and television, Helenurm had also appeared in feature films; her most prominent role was that of Soo in the 1988 Leida Laius-directed Tallinnfilm drama Varastatud kohtumine.

== Personal life and death ==
Helle-Reet Helenurm married fellow actor Kalju Komissarov in 1967, while both were students at the Tallinn State Conservatory. The couple later divorced in 1971. She had a son, translator and musician Pearu Helenurm. Following a diagnosis of cancer, Helenurm continued to work and only shared the news of the diagnosis with a few of her colleagues. She died in Tallinn, aged 59, and was buried at Tallinn's Forest Cemetery.

== Acknowledgements ==
- Merited Artist of the Estonian SSR (1986)
