= Ester Pajusoo =

Estonian actress (1934–2026)

- Born: Ester Lage; 1 July 1934; Nõmme, Harju County, Estonia
- Died: 19 April 2026 (aged 91)
- Occupation: Actress
- Years active: 1958–2026
- Spouse: Jüri Pajusoo (1956–2006)
- Awards

Ester Pajusoo (née Lage; 1 July 1934 – 19 April 2026) was an Estonian stage, film, radio and television actress whose career spanned nearly six decades.

== Early life ==
Ester Pajusoo was born Ester Lage on 1 July 1934, in the small village of Nõmme in rural Tuhala Parish (now, Kose Parish; not to be confused with Nõmme, one of the urban administrative districts of Tallinn), she was the youngest of three daughters of Johannes Lage and Marie Johanna "Anni" Lage (née Kull). She had three older half-siblings from her father's previous marriage. She graduated from secondary school in Tallinn in 1953 and attended the Estonian Drama Theatre's training studio, graduating in 1957. In 1956, she began using the surname Pajusoo after her marriage to Jüri Pajusoo.

== Stage career ==
Ester Pajusoo began an engagement at the Estonian Drama Theatre in 1958, the year following her graduation. She subsequently remained with the theatre. She made her stage debut at the theatre in Bertolt Brecht's Mr Puntila and his Man Matti in 1958. During her years at the theatre, she performed in a number of stage productions by such international playwrights and authors as: William Shakespeare, Samuel Beckett, Henrik Ibsen, Evgeny Schwartz, Hjalmar Söderberg, Friedrich Dürrenmatt, Yukio Mishima, Arthur Miller and Anton Chekhov, among others. Notable performances in works by Estonian playwrights and authors include those of: Oskar Luts, Mats Traat, Andrus Kivirähk, Jaan Kross and A. H. Tammsaare.

== Film and television ==
Pajusoo made her film debut as the character Sirje in the 1960 Virve Aruoja directed Estonian drama television film Näitleja Joller. This was followed by a small, uncredited role in the 1972 Sulev Nõmmik directed television film comedy Noor pensionär. In 1981, she made her screen debut in the Arvo Kruusement directed drama Karge meri; an adaptation of the 1938 August Gailit novel of the same name. She would not appear in another film until 2006; in the Roman Baskin directed comedy Vana daami visiit. Her appearance in Vana daami visiit would revive her film career and between 2006 and 2016, she would appear in eight films; including the title role of Astrid in the 2016 Sander Koit directed drama short.

Among her more memorable roles in television was that of the recurring character Reet from 2008 until 2013 in the historical mini-series Tuulepealne maa, which aired on Eesti Televisioon. She also made appearances on Estonian television series including Ohtlik lend, Kättemaksukontor and IT-planeet.

== Personal life and death ==
Pajusoo was married to Jüri Pajusoo from 1956 until his death in 2006. As of 2016, she resided in Tallinn. Pajusoo died on 19 April 2026, at the age of 91.

== Acknowledgements ==
- Väike Ants, Estonian Drama Theatre Prize, Supporting Actress (Imbi Rehepapp; Rehepapp ja näärisokk and Vihukse perenaine; Tagasi Vargamäel) (2001)
- Order of the White Star, IV Class (2004)
