= The Birdwatcher =

1987 film directed by Arvo Iho

- Directed by: Arvo Iho
- Screenplay by: Marina Šeptunova
- Starring: Svetlana Tormahova; Erik Ruus
- Cinematography: Tatjana Loginova
- Edited by: Marju Juhkum; Ingrid Laos
- Music by: Lepo Sumera
- Production company: Tallinnfilm
- Release dates: 14 March 1988 (Tallinn, Estonia); 28 September 1989 (Germany)
- Running time: 89 minutes
- Countries: Estonia; Soviet Union
- Languages: Estonian; Russian

The Birdwatcher (also The Bird Watcher or The Observer, Estonian: Vaatleja) is an Estonian film directed by Arvo Iho for the Tallinnfilm studio, filmed in 1987 in the northern Urals, and first shown in cinemas in 1988. It stars Svetlana Tormahova as a Russian forester and Erik Ruus as a student who meets her while studying ornithology on the island where she works.

Iho had previously worked with Leida Laius on several documentaries, and The Birdwatcher is his solo directorial debut.

The Birdwatcher won awards at the Karlovy Vary International Film Festival, the Torino Film Festival, and the Rouen Nordic Film Festival.

== Plot ==
24-year old Estonian ornithology student Peeter travels to a small island in the Russian North for fieldwork, where he meets Aleksandra, a middle-aged Russian forester and poacher. They begin a love/hate relationship that leads to tragic consequences when Peeter is killed in a trap set by Aleksandra.

== Cast ==
- Svetlana Tormahova – Aleksandra
- Erik Ruus – Peeter

== Reception ==
In the book Postcolonial Approaches to Eastern European Cinema: Portraying Neighbours on Screen, the authors commented on the polarities between the two characters, with Peeter representing mind, law and order, rationality, and idealism, while Aleksandra represents body, criminality, barbarity, and cynicism, which they equated to Edward Said's characterization of the occidental and oriental, with "Russia [functioning] to a considerable degree as a negative model against which Estonian 'Westernness' is constructed", and their affair "symbolic of the complicated relationship between Russia and the Baltic countries it subjugated to its power".

== Awards ==
- Karlovy Vary International Film Festival (Czech Republic), 1988, FIPRESCI prize for best debut film
- Torino Film Festival (Italy), 1989, Jury Special Award
- Rouen Nordic Film Festival (France), 1990, Grand Prix
