= Heikki Haravee =

Estonian actor (1924–2003)

- Born: Heikki Huusmann; 29 April 1924; Tallinn Estonia
- Died: 23 January 2003 (aged 78); Tartu, Estonia
- Occupations: Actor, theatre director, singer
- Years active: 1949–2002

Heikki Haravee (born Heikki Huusmann; 29 April 1924 – 23 January 2003) was an Estonian actor, theatre director, and singer whose career spanned over fifty years; forty-three of which were spent at the Vanemuine theatre in Tartu.

== Early life ==
Heikki Haravee was born and raised in Tallinn as Heikki Huusmann. The family changed the surname to Haravee in early 1939 when he was fourteen. He graduated from Tallinn 2 Gymnasium (now, Tallinn Secondary School of Science) in 1943 while Estonia was under German occupation during World War II. Afterward, he enrolled at the Estonian State Theatre Institute in Tallinn to study drama under instructors Ants Lauter, Priit Põldroos, Leo Kalmet, and Felix Moor, among others, graduating in 1949. Among his graduating classmates were Gunnar Kilgas, Jüri Järvet, Ellen Alaküla, and Ellen Kaarma. After graduation, Haravee was engaged at the South Estonia Theater in Võru with most of his graduate classmates from the Estonian State Theater Institute. However, the theatre was poorly funded and closed in 1951 after only two years of operation.

== Stage career ==
Following the closure of the South Estonia Theatre, Haravee spent eight years (1952–1960) at the Lydia Koidula Pärnu Drama Theater (now, the Endla Theatre) in Pärnu before joining the Vanmuine theatre in Tartu in 1960. From 1961 until 1962, he studied stage direction and drama at the Estonian Studio of the Lutasharsky National Institute of Theatrical Arts (GITIS) in Moscow. Haravee's engagement at the Vanemuine would last forty-three years; ending upon his death in 2003. Highlights of his early career at the Vanemuine include performances in Juhan Smuul's Kihnu Jõnnis (1963), Henrik Ibsen's Ghosts (1965), Mati Unt's See maailm või teine (1966), and Arthur Miller's The Crucible (1969). Haravee also performed in a number of productions of operas and operettas by Georg Philipp Telemann, Gioachino Rossini, and Giuseppe Verdi.

Throughout the 1960s and 1970s, Haravee also instructed actors and worked as a director of several productions at the Vanemuine, worked as a performing arts instructor at the University of Tartu, as well as performing onstage and in radio plays. Notable performances of the 1970s include roles in productions of Oskar Luts' 1933 novel Tagahoovis (1974) and A. H. Tammsaare's 1939 novel Põrgupõhja uus Vanapagan (1976). In 1986, Haravee had the memorable role of Gregory Solomon in a Vanemuine production of Arthur Miller's 1968 play The Price and continued to perform throughout the 1990s and early 2000s, notably in mature roles in performances under the direction of theatre director Jaan Tooming. His last stage performance before his death was a role in a production of the 1784 Friedrich Schiller tragedy Intrigue and Love a week prior to his death.

== Film and television ==
Heikki Haravee has also appeared in a number of feature films and teleplays. In 1972, he appeared as Manov in the Madis Ojamaa-directed historic adventure feature Verekivi for Tallinnfilm. In 1975, he played the role of Valter, a fanatical Nazi, in the Antonis Vogiazos-directed Russian language World War II television drama miniseries Variant 'Omega'. In 1977, he reprised his role of Kaval-Ants for a television production of the A. H. Tammsaare's Põrgupõhja uus Vanapagan and two years later garnered the starring role of Jaan Ööbik in the Jaan Tooming-directed Eesti Televisioon (ETV) telefilm Mees ja mänd, opposite actress Herta Elviste.

In 1981, he appeared in the Valentin Kuik-directed television film comedy Teaduse ohver, based on the 1936 Branislav Nušić play Dr. He spent the remaining decade and 1990s appearing onstage and directing and appearing in a number of radio plays.

== Death ==
Heikki Haravee died on 23 January 2003 at age 78 after suffering a stroke at his residence in Tartu.

== Acknowledgements ==
- Merited Artist of the Estonian SSR (1978)
