= Somnambuul =

Estonian World War II film (2003)

- Directed by: Sulev Keedus
- Written by: Sulev Keedus; Madis Kõiv
- Produced by: Kaie-Ene Rääk; Lasse Saarinen
- Starring: Katariina Unt; Evald Aavik; Ivo Uukkivi; Jan Uuspõld
- Cinematography: Rein Kotov
- Edited by: Kaie-Ene Rääk
- Music by: Helena Tulve
- Production company: F-Seitse
- Release date: 18 September 2003
- Running time: 129 minutes
- Country: Estonia
- Language: Estonian

Somnambuul (English: Somnambulance) is a 2003 Estonian drama film directed by Sulev Keedus.

The film is set in autumn 1944 in Estonia. Thousands of people are fleeing to the west in order to be free from Soviet occupation. A young woman, Eetla, is about to reach a boat, but at the last moment she resigns and goes back to her home. Her father is the only one on the island, who also didn't escape. Fear, dreams and unknown future are ahead.

Awards:

- 2004: Festival Baltyk-o-Balkan (Paris, France), 2004, Grand Prix

== Cast ==
- Evald Aavik as Gottfried, lighthouse keeper Gottfried
- Katariina Unt as Eetla, Gottfried's daughter Eetla
- Ivo Uukkivi as Kasper, war refugee
- Jan Uuspõld as Ivan, Russian soldier
