= Leila Säälik =

Estonian actress

- Born: 4 December 1941 (age 84); Tallinn, Estonia
- Other name: Leila Kalmet
- Occupation: Actress
- Years active: 1960 – present
- Spouse: Toomas Kalmet (1964 – 1969; divorced)
- Children: 3

Leila Säälik (born 4 December 1941) is an Estonian stage, film and radio actress.

== Early life and education ==
Leila Säälik was born in Tallinn. Her father was a machinist and her mother was a seamstress. She attended primary and secondary schools in Tallinn, graduating from Tallinn 7th Secondary School in 1960. Afterward, she enrolled at the Viljandi Cultural School (now, the University of Tartu Viljandi Culture Academy), graduating in 1963.

== Stage career ==
In 1962, while still a student at the Viljandi Culture Academy, Säälik became engaged at the Ugala theatre in Viljandi as an actress. Säälik's career at the Ugala was prolific and she would perform as an actress until her retirement from the Ugala in 2008; 46 years. She made her stage debut as Liis in the August Kitzberg and Juhan Simm Estonian language singspiel Kosjasõit in 1962. During her long career at the Ugala, Säälik has appeared in roles in productions of such varied international authors and playwrights as: Shakespeare, Steinbeck, O'Neill, Dostoyevsky, Albee, Ibsen, Gorky, Shaw, De Filippo, Enquist, De Coster, and Feuchtwanger, among many others. Roles at the Ugala in works by Estonian authors and playwrights include those of: A. H. Tammsaare, Oskar Luts, Hella Wuolijoki, Rein Saluri, Urmas Lennuk, Jaan Kross, Juhan Smuul, Olav Ehala, and several others.

After retiring from the Ugala, Säälik became a freelance actress. She has also performed onstage at the Kuressaare City Theatre, the Endla Theatre in Pärnu, the Vanemuine theatre in Tartu, and several other prominent Estonian theatres throughout her career.

== Film career ==
Leila Säälik made her film debut as Anete in the 1971 Kaljo Kiisk directed Tallinnfilm drama Tuuline rand, which was an adaptation of the 1951 four volume novel of the same name by author Adu Hint. In 1973, she had a starring role as Reet, opposite Latvian actor Uldis Pūcītis in the Kaljo Kiisk directed romantic drama Maaletulek. Following her role in Maaletulek, Säälik would concentrate on her stage work and not appear in another film until the role of Mrs. Rinnus in the 1990 dramatic short film Teenijanna, directed by Veiko Jürisson and based on the short story Epp by Mait Metsanurk.

In 2006, Säälik would return to film with the role of Mathilde III in the Roman Baskin directed Vana daami visiit; an adaptation of the 1956 tragicomic play by Swiss dramatist Friedrich Dürrenmatt. In 2007, she had a small but pivotal role in the Ilmar Raag directed Klass as the grandmother of Kaspar, one of two boys in secondary school who experience severe bullying and eventually engage in a school shooting. The film received awards from Karlovy Vary International Film Festival, the Warsaw International Film Festival, and the Tallinn Black Nights Film Festival. It was also the official Estonian submission to the Best Foreign Language Film Category of the 80th Academy Awards, but did not make the shortlist . Säälik would reprise her role in Klass: Elu pärast in 2010, an Eesti Televisioon (ETV) mini-series that chronicled the aftermath of the school shooting.

In 2013, Leila Säälik appeared as the character Malle in the Ilmar Raag directed romantic drama Kertu, starring Ursula Ratasepp and Mait Malmsten for Amrion.

== Television and radio ==
Since 2010, Leila Säälik has appeared in the role of Maimu Laurand, a sharp-tongued and spiteful mother-in-law, on the popular Kanal 2 drama series Pilvede all. The series has won three Estonian Entertainment Awards.

Throughout her acting career, Säälik also performed in a number of radio theatre plays. Among her more memorable roles was as Anne in a 1975 radio production of Inge Trikkel's Öölaul, opposite actor Rein Malmsten.

== Personal life ==
Leila Säälik was married to actor Toomas Kalmet from 1964 until their divorce in 1969. She has three children; two sons and a daughter, and is a grandmother. She currently resides in Abja-Paluoja in Viljandi County.

== Acknowledgements ==
- Merited Artist of the Estonian SSR (1974)
- People's Artist of the Estonian Soviet Socialist Republic (1986)
- Estonian Theatre Award for Best Actress (2003)
- Order of the White Star, IV Class (2011)
