= Piret Krumm =

Estonian actress and singer

- Born: 20 January 1989 (age 37); Tallinn, then part of Estonian SSR, Soviet Union
- Occupations: Actress, singer, comedian
- Years active: 2012–present
- Parent(s): Tõnu Kilgas (father); Katrin Karisma (mother)
- Relatives: Hedvig Hanson (half-sister); Ellen Kaarma (grandmother); Lembit Mägedi (grandfather)

Piret Krumm (born 20 January 1989) is an Estonian actress, singer, and comedian whose career began in the early 2010s. She has performed as a stage, television, film and voice actress, as well as a jury panelist for the Eesti Laul competition. She is a singer for the Tallinn-based band Diskofon.

== Early life and education ==
Piret Krumm was born in Tallinn to actors and singers Tõnu Kilgas and Katrin Karisma. She took her surname from her step-father, opera singer Hendrik Krumm, while still a child. She has three half-sisters from her father's previous relationships and marriages, including jazz singer Hedvig Hanson, and two half-siblings from her mother's marriage to Krumm. Her paternal grandparents were Vanemuine theatre actors Ellen Kaarma and Lembit Mägedi.

Krumm attended primary and secondary schools in Tallinn before enrolling in at the Estonian Academy of Music and Theatre's Performing Arts Department to study acting under course supervisor Elmo Nüganen, graduating in 2012. Among her graduating classmates were: Henrik Kalmet, Karl-Andreas Kalmet, Priit Pius, Märt Pius, Pääru Oja, Liis Lass, Maiken Schmidt, and Kaspar Velberg.

== Career ==
Following graduation from the Estonian Academy of Music and Theatre in 2012, Krumm began an engagement as an actress at the Estonian Drama Theatre in Tallinn. Krumm remained with the theatre until 2017, when she opted to leave to become a freelance actress.

Following several roles in student films in 2013, Krumm made her feature film debut as Lilith in the 2017 Sulev Keedus directed drama Mehetapja/Süütu/Vari and the same year appeared as Jõgeva "Rabbit" in the Priit Pääsuke drama feature Keti lõpp. In 2019, she appeared as Rita in the third installment of the René Vilbre directed Klassikokkutulek comedy films, Klassikokkutulek 3: Ristiisad.

in 2020, she appeared as a social worker in the Lauri Randla directed and Peeter Urbla produced period Exitfilm comedy film Hüvasti, NSVL. In 2021, she appeared in a starring role as Karin in the Priit Pääsuke directed comedy youth film Öölapsed.

Krumm has also worked as a voice actress; In 2015, she provided Estonian language dubbing for the American animated film Inside Out. In 2017, she dubbed the voice of the character Valerie for the American animated film Despicable Me 3. In 2020, she voiced the character of Kristel Adrienne in the animated children's film Sipsik.

In 2015, she was a contestant on TV3's Su nägu kõlab tuttavalt, the Estonian version of Your Face Sounds Familiar, an interactive reality television franchise series where celebrity contestants impersonate singers. Krumm's impersonations included Steven Tyler of Aerosmith, Alannah Myles, Keith Flint of The Prodigy, her half-sister Hedvig Hanson, Etta James, Rihanna, Kanye West, and Paul McCartney. Krumm placed fifth at the end of the competition.

In 2017, Krumm was a jury panelist for the Eesti Laul finals broadcast on Eesti Televisioon (ETV); the competition to decide who will represent Estonia at the Eurovision Song Contest. In 2019, she was the competition's co-host with singer Karl-Erik Taukar.

Since 2013, Krumm has also frequently performed as one-half of a comedy duo with fellow actress Katariina Tamm. The two women have appeared onstage at comedy festivals and on television in skits and in monologues.

In addition to acting, Krumm sings for the retro, disco-influenced pop band Diskofon and operates a café in Tallinn.

In 2026, she appeared as Anne in the Ergo Kuld directed comedy film Säärane mulk, an adaptation of the 1872 play by Lydia Koidula. The same year became a contestant in season one of Taskmaster - kuninga käsul, the Estonian TV3 adaptation of the British comedy gameshow Taskmaster.
