= The Heart of the Bear =

2001 film by Arvo Iho

The Heart of the Bear (Estonian: Karu süda)
- Directed by: Arvo Iho
- Written by: Nikolai Baturin
- Produced by: Kristian Taska
- Cinematography: Rein Kotov
- Edited by: Sirje Haagel, Arvo Iho
- Music by: Peeter Vähi
- Release date: 6 September 2001
- Running time: 95 minutes
- Countries: Estonia; Czech Republic; Germany; Russia
- Languages: Estonian; Russian

The Heart of the Bear (Estonian: Karu süda) is a 2001 Estonian, Czech, German, Russian co-produced romantic drama film directed by Arvo Iho. It was Estonia's submission to the 74th Academy Awards for the Academy Award for Best Foreign Language Film, but was not accepted as a nominee. It was also entered into the 24th Moscow International Film Festival.

== Plot ==
A young Estonian hunter ventures into the Siberian taiga, seeking to discover his true self, far from the reaches of civilization. Building a home in the wilderness, Niika quickly integrates with the local Evenki people, among whom he becomes well-liked. Several women fall in love with him: first, a young village teacher who wants to be a good wife to him; and second, a striking fifteen-year-old from the local tribe, wild and untamed, who becomes his mythical "bear-woman". When this rejected beauty plunges a knife into her stomach, Niika’s life takes a dark turn. After he inadvertently kills a large black bear — symbolizing his own "shadow self" — he is burdened with guilt and haunted by the bear-woman, who transforms from time to time into a silent, savage figure. Yet, he is ultimately offered a chance to find inner peace and restore balance within himself.

== Cast ==
- Rain Simmul as Nika / Nganasan
- Dinara Drukarova as Gitya
- Ilyana Pavlova as Emily
- Külli Teetamm as Laima
- Lembit Ulfsak as Simon
- Nail Chaikhoutdinov as Tolkun
- Arvo Kukumägi as Venjamin
- Galina Bokashevskaya as Katherine
- Merle Palmiste as Grey-One
