= Georgica (film) =

1998 film directed by Sulev Keedus

- Directed by: Sulev Keedus
- Written by: Sulev Keedus; Madis Kõiv
- Starring: Evald Aavik; Mait Merekülski; Ülle Toming
- Release date: 1998
- Running time: 109 minutes
- Country: Estonia
- Language: Estonian

Georgica is a 1998 Estonian drama film directed by Sulev Keedus. The film takes its name from Virgil's poem of the same name.

== Plot ==
The action takes place in post-World War II Estonia. An old man lives alone on a deserted island which the Soviet fighter planes use for nighttime target practicing. A young neglected boy, who has become mute, is banished from the mainland and sent to the island to keep the old man company. Both are haunted by memories, the boy about his mother and the old man about the years before World War I he spent as a young missionary in Africa.

== Cast ==
- Evald Aavik – Jakub
- Mait Merekülski – Maecenas (Boy)
- Ülle Toming – Mother

== Reception ==
Georgica was well received by critics. The Association of Estonian Film Journalists awarded it the annual prize of Film of the Year in 1998 and in 2006 Estonian film critics chose Georgica the best film of the 15 years since Estonia regained independence.

The film was shown at several international film festivals, including Rotterdam, Stockholm (awarded Honorable Mention), Toronto and Prix Europa Festival in Berlin (awarded Prix Europa Special).
