= Ivo Lill =

Estonian glass artist (1953–2019)

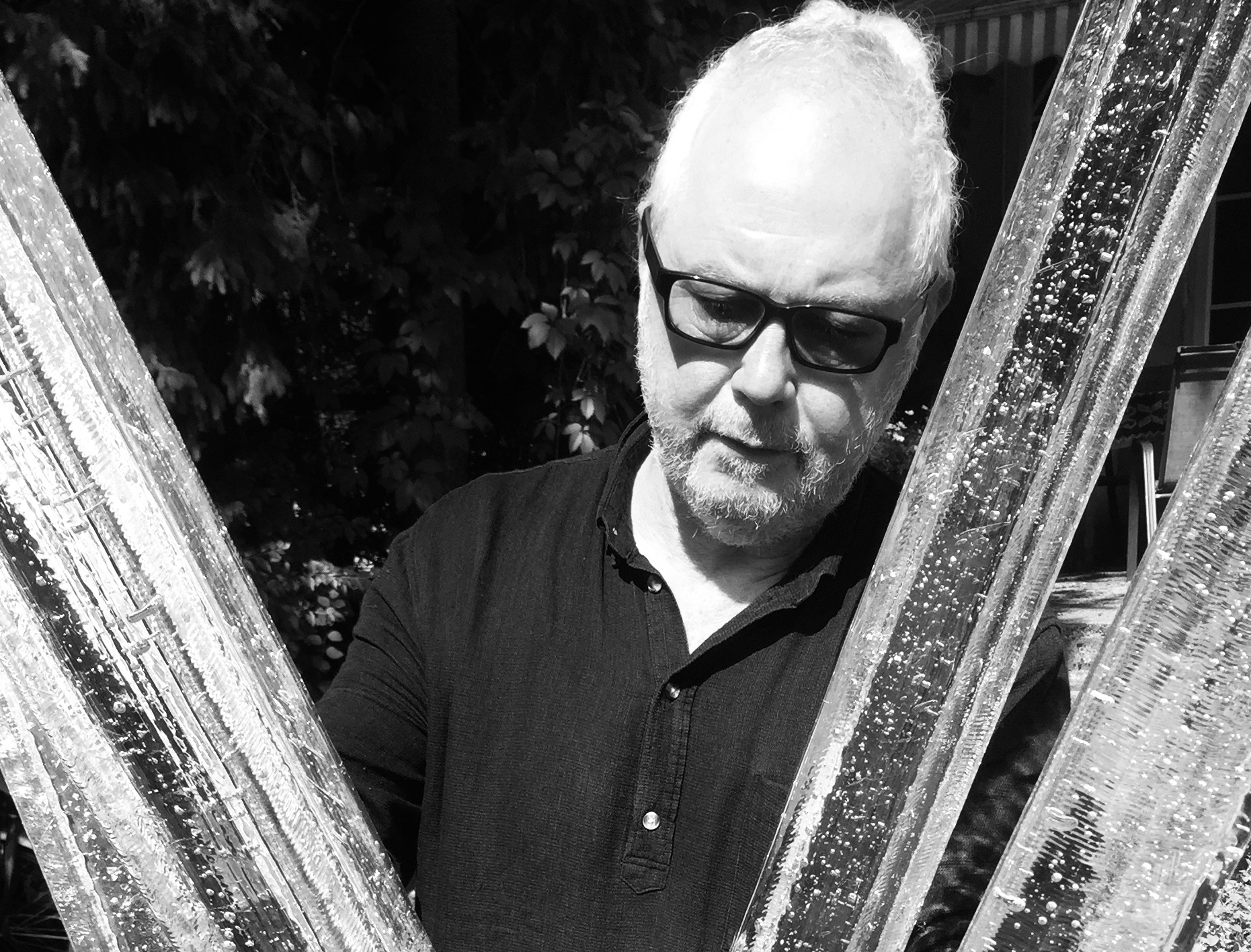
Ivo Lill in 2016

Ivo Lill (24 June 1953 – 4 August 2019) was an Estonian glass artist.

== Early life and education ==
Ivo Lill was born in Tallinn to Felix Lill and Asta Lill (née Multer). His father was arrested by Soviet authorities and spent several years sentenced to forced labor in the gulag system in Siberia, but was able to later return to the family. Lill was the youngest child of three siblings; he had two older sisters, Kadri, and actress Mari Lill. Lill grew up and attended schools in the district of Nõmme and spent time visiting his grandmother on the island of Saaremaa. His niece is actress Elisabet Reinsalu.

Lill was a 1985 graduate of the Estonian Academy of Arts in Tallinn and worked almost exclusively in the medium of glass sculpting and design. He was a member of the Estonian Artists' Association, G.A.S. (The Glass Art Society) of Seattle, United States, and the Centro Studio Vetro, of Murano-Venice, Italy.

== Works in public collections ==
- Art Museum of Estonia – Tallinn, Estonia
- Estonian Art Fund – Tallinn, Estonia
- Tallinn Art Hall – Tallinn, Estonia
- Tallinn Museum of Applied Art – Tallinn, Estonia
- Tartu Art Museum – Tartu, Estonia
- Tallinn Business Center – Tallinn, Estonia
- The Corning Museum of Glass – Corning, New York, United States
- Glasmuseet Ebeltoft – Ebeltoft, Denmark
- Glasmuseum Frauenau – Frauenau, Germany
- Centre del Vidre de Barcelona – Barcelona, Spain
- Gus-Khrustalny Glass Museum – Gus-Khrustalny, Russia
- Bohemia Hall – Nový Bor, Czech Republic
- Ministry of Culture of the Republic of Lithuania – Vilnius, Lithuania
- Zimmerli Art Museum at Rutgers University – New Brunswick, New Jersey, United States

== Commissioned works ==
- since 2006 – Estonian Annual Theatre Awards "Theodori silm" trophies
- 2002 – Trophies for the Eurovision Song Contest
- since 1999 – Annual Prizes for The Black Nights Film festival
- since 1999 – Annual Prizes for Estonian Drama Theatre
- 1994 – Glass sculpture "The Right To Hope", (47×20×20 cm), "One World Art" programme, travelling exhibition
- 1993 – Glass sculpture "The Trinity", (28×28×27 cm), a gift to the Catholic Pope John Paul II from the Union of Estonian Churches, Pope's Artistic Collection, Vatican City
- 1986 – Glass sculpture “Seven Cubed”, (30×30×30 cm), Ministry of Culture of Russia (Moscow)
- 1985 – Glass sculpture “Monster", (100×50×70 cm), Estonian Embassy in Moscow, Russia

== Awards ==
- 2014 – Tallinn Order of Merit
- 2001 – The Silver Prize of the International Exhibition of Glass, Kanazawa, Japan
- 1999 – Kristjan Raud Annual Arts Award
- 1995 - Kristjan Raud Annual Arts Award
- 1988 – The prize on the Baltic Applied Art Triennial IV
- 1986 – The Annual Estonian Artists' Union award

== Personal life and death ==
Ivo Lill was married to Irene Lill. The couple had two daughters. He died unexpectedly at age 66 in Haapsalu on 4 August 2019.
