= Evald Aavik =

Estonian actor (1941–2024)

- Aavik in The Only Sunday (1990)
- Born: January 24, 1941; Kuressaare, then part of Estonian SSR, Soviet Union
- Died: May 7, 2024 (aged 83)
- Education: Vanemuine Theatre's stage art studio
- Occupation: Actor
- Years active: 1966–2024
- Known for: Theatre and film roles

Evald Aavik (24 January 1941 – 7 May 2024) was an Estonian actor.

== Life and career ==
Aavik was born in Kuressaare on 24 January 1941. In 1965 he graduated from Vanemuine Theatre's stage art studio (diploma nr 1). 1966–1988 he worked at Vanemuine Theatre, 1986–1989 in Ugala Theatre and 1989–1993 in Estonian Youth Theatre. Besides theatre roles he also appeared in several films. Aavik died on 7 May 2024, at the age of 83.

== Filmography ==
- Inimesed sõdurisinelis (1968) as lieutenant Aava
- Reigi õpetaja (1977) as Jako
- Tuulte pesa (1979) as foreigner
- Jõulud Vigalas (1980) as Bernhard Laipmann
- Naerata ometi (1985) as teacher
- Näkimadalad (1989) as Jakob Ambrosson
- Doktor Stockmann (1989) as episode
- Ainus pühapäev (1990) as father
- Perekondlik sündmus (1998) as grandfather
- Georgica (1998) as Jakub
- Somnambuul (2003) as Gottfrid
- Räägitakse, et tomatid armastavad rokkmuusikat (2016) as Aleksander
- Mehetapja/Süütu/Vari (2017) as Heino
