= Rouen Nordic Film Festival =

Coordinates: 49°26′N 01°05′E

The Rouen Nordic Film Festival (French: Festival du Cinéma Nordique) was a film festival hold in Rouen, France for screening and competition films made in Nordic and Baltic countries, the Netherlands and Belgium.

In December 2010, the organizers, in conflict with the City Council, announce their intention to put an end to the festival.

== The Grand Jury Prize ==
- 2010 - Norway: Upperdog (2009), Director: Sara Johnsen
- 2009 - Norway: Cold Lunch (2008), Director: Eva Sørhaug
- 2008 - Denmark: Temporary release (2007), Director: Erik Clausen
- 2007 - Norway: Reprise (2006), Director: Joachim Trier
- 2005 - Norway: Uno (2004), Director: Aksel Hennie
- 2004 - Norway: Falling Sky (2002) (Norwegian: Himmelfall), Director: Gunnar Vikene
- 2003 - Iceland: Noi the Albino (2003) (Icelandic: Nói albínói), Director: Dagur Kári
- 2002 - Netherlands: Drift (2001), Director: Michiel van Jaarsveld
- 2001 - Iceland: 101 Reykjavík (2000), Director: Baltasar Kormákur
- 2000 - Norway: Magnetist's Fifth Winter (1999) (Norwegian: Magnetisörens femte vinter), Director: Morten Henriksen
- 1999 - Belgium: When the Light Comes (1998), Director: Stijn Coninx
- 1998 - Lithuania: A Wolf Teeth Necklace (1997) (Lithuanian: Vilko dantu karoliai), Director: Algimantas Puipa
- 1997 - Sweden: Hamsun (1996), Director: Jan Troell
- 1996 - Finland: The Last Wedding (1995) (Finnish: Kivenpyörittäjän kylä), Director: Markku Pölönen
- 1994 - Norway: Daddy Blue (1994) (Norwegian: Du Pappa), Director: René Bjerke
- 1993 - Iceland: Ingaló (1992), Director: Ásdís Thoroddsen
- 1992 - Denmark: The Great Day on the Beach (1991) (Danish: Den Store badedag), Director: Stellan Olsson
- 1991 - Denmark: The Birthday Trip (1990) (Danish: Kaj's fødselsdag) (1990), Director: Lone Scherfig
- 1990 - Estonia: The Observer (1988) (Estonian: Vaatleja), Director: Arvo Iho
- 1989 - Finland: The Glory and Misery of Human Life (1988) (Finnish: Ihmiselon ihanuus ja kurjuus), Director: Matti Kassila
- 1988 - Denmark: Babette's Feast (1987) (Danish: Babettes gæstebud), Director: Gabriel Axel
