= Arvo Iho =

Estonian film director and cinematographer

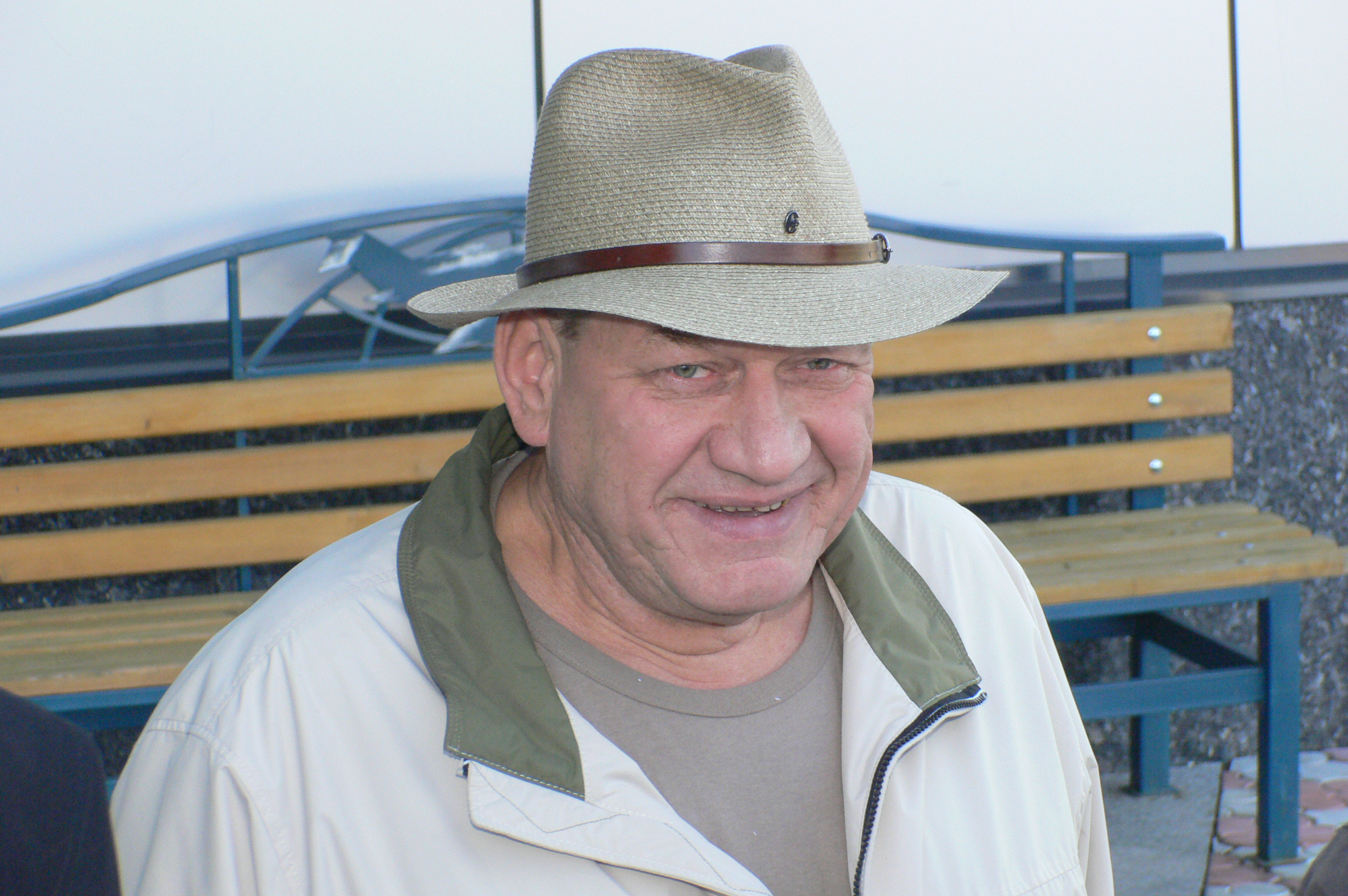
- Born: 21 June 1949 (age 77); Rakvere, then part of Estonian SSR, Soviet Union
- Occupations: Film director, cinematographer
- Years active: 1970s–present

Arvo Iho (born 21 June 1949) is an Estonian film director, cinematographer, actor and photographer, who has worked in the areas of documentary and drama.

== Career ==
Iho was born in Rakvere, and he is of Ingrian Finnish descent. He worked as a photographer and assistant for Tallinnfilm before studying cinematography at the Gerasimov Institute of Cinematography. Iho acted as assistant director to Andrei Tarkovsky on the 1979 film Stalker. He went on to work as a cameraman for Tallinnfilm in the 1980s.

In 1985, Iho co-directed the feature film Games for School–Age Children with Leida Laius, also acting as director of cinematography, and in 1987 made his solo directorial debut with The Birdwatcher, about the relationship between a poacher and an ornithologist. He followed this with Only for the Insane (1990). In 2001 he made The Heart of the Bear, based on the Nikolai Baturin novel, and in 2006 made Gooseberries.

As a photographer, Iho has exhibited nationally and internationally.

As of 2017, Iho was a professor at Tallinn University's Baltic Film and Media School.

== Filmography as director ==
- Mitme Kandiga Õun (Skulptor Ülo Õun) (1984)
- 29 Minutes with Ülo Õun (1984)
- Games for School-Age Children (1985)
- Tülitaja (1986)
- The Birdwatcher (1987)
- Milarepa Laulud (1989)
- For Crazies Only (1990)
- Sireniki Kroonika (1991)
- Impeeriumi Lapsed (1993)
- Jaanipäev Ingerimaal (1995)
- The Heart of the Bear (2001)
- Marina Kuvaitseva and the Lonely Women (2004)
- Children of the Singing Revolution (2004)

== Awards ==
- National Union Prize for the Best Youth Film, 1987, for Games for School-Age Children
- UNICEF Award, Berlin International Film Festival, 1987 (with Leida Laius), for Naerata ometi
- Jury Special Prize, Torino International Festival of Young Cinema, 1988, for The Birdwatcher
- FIPRESCI prize for best debut film, Karlovy Vary International Film Festival (Czech Republic), 1988, for The Birdwatcher
- Grand Jury Prize, Rouen Nordic Film Festival, 1990, for The Birdwatcher
- Grand Prize & Catholic Film Critics Award, Mannheim-Heidelberg International Filmfestival, 1992, for Ainult hulludele ehk halastajaõde
- Order of the White Star, V Class, 2001.
