= Erik Ruus =

Estonian actor (1962–2025)

- Born: 23 April 1962
- Died: 22 April 2025 (aged 62)

Erik Ruus (until 1986 Erik Molodov, pseudonym Erik Moldov; 23 April 1962 – 22 April 2025) was an Estonian actor.

== Life and career ==
Ruus was born on 23 April 1962. In 1982 he graduated from Viljandi Culture Academy. Between 1985 and 1995 and 1996 and 2009, he was an actor at the Rakvere Theatre. From 1995 to 1996, he was an actor at the Endla Theatre in Pärnu. Beginning in 2009, he was a freelance actor. Besides performing in stage roles, he also acted in films and television series.

Ruus died on 22 April 2025, at the age of 62.

== Filmography ==
- 1987: Vaatleja
- 1991: Ainus pühapäev
- 1995: Tulivesi
- 1997: Minu Leninid
- 2002: Ferdinand
- 2005: Stiilipidu
- 2006: Ohtlik lend
- 2009: Päeva lõpus
- 2010: Kutsar koputab kolm korda
- 2019: Johannes Pääsukese tõeline elu
