= Naerata ometi =

1985 film directed by Arvo Iho and Leida Laius

Games for Schoolchildren
- Naerata ometi
- Directed by: Arvo Iho; Leida Laius
- Written by: Silvia Rannamaa; Marina Sheptunova
- Starring: Monika Järv; Hendrik Toompere Jr.; Tauri Tallermaa
- Cinematography: Arvo Iho
- Edited by: Lauri Kärk
- Music by: Lepo Sumera
- Production company: Tallinnfilm
- Release date: 28 November 1985
- Running time: 83 minutes
- Countries: Estonia; Soviet Union
- Language: Estonian

Games for Schoolchildren (also known as Games for Teenagers or Well, Come On, Smile; (Estonian: Naerata ometi) is a 1985 Estonian drama film directed by Arvo Iho and Leida Laius. The film is loosely based on the 1963 short story Kasuema (Stepmother) by Estonian author Silvia Rannamaa.

== Plot ==
After the death of her mother, high school student Mari ends up in an orphanage. Three days later, the girl returns home, but her drunken father makes it clear almost from the door that she doesn't belong here.

The night spent at the train station ends for Mari with an acquaintance with an aggressive group of teenagers, led by Robi, and being driven to the police. In the morning, the fugitive leaves the cell: the orphanage teacher came for her.

The orphanage has its own internal hierarchy. The dashing guy Robi is considered the informal leader. The guys obey him and readily obey. The polite, intelligent Tauri, who, unlike the other pupils, has a respectable and very busy father, takes custody of the newcomer. Among the girls, the harsh, nervous Katrin, who ended up in an orphanage after her mother was imprisoned, dominates.

== Cast ==
- Monika Järv as Mari Lehiste
- Hendrik Toompere Jr. as Robi
- Tauri Tallermaa as Tauri
- Katrin Tampleht as Katrin
- Kerttu Aaving as Kerttu
- Edith Helen Tuusk as Melita
- Siiri Sisask as Siiri
- Janika Kalmus as Anne
- Helle Kuningas as Nursery teacher
- Mari Lill as Robi's mother
- Evald Hermaküla as Ülo, Mari's father
- Eduard Tinn as Tauri's father
- Rudolf Allabert as Director of the orphanage
- Rein Pakk as Rein
- Maria Klenskaja as Ülo's lover
- Evald Aavik as Teacher

== Awards and nominations ==
- All-Union Film Festival (1986)
  - Grand Prize
  - Best Screenplay (Marina Sheptunova)
- International Film Festival of Young Filmmakers of Socialist Countries in Koszalin (1986) — Polish Film Critics Prize named after Wisniewski (Arvo Iho)
- USSR State Prize for 1987 (director and cameraman Arvo Iho, screenwriter Marina Sheptunova)
- Berlin International Film Festival (1987) — participation in the "Kinderfilmfest" program, prize of the United Nations Children's Fund
