= Hedvig Hanson =

Estonian singer

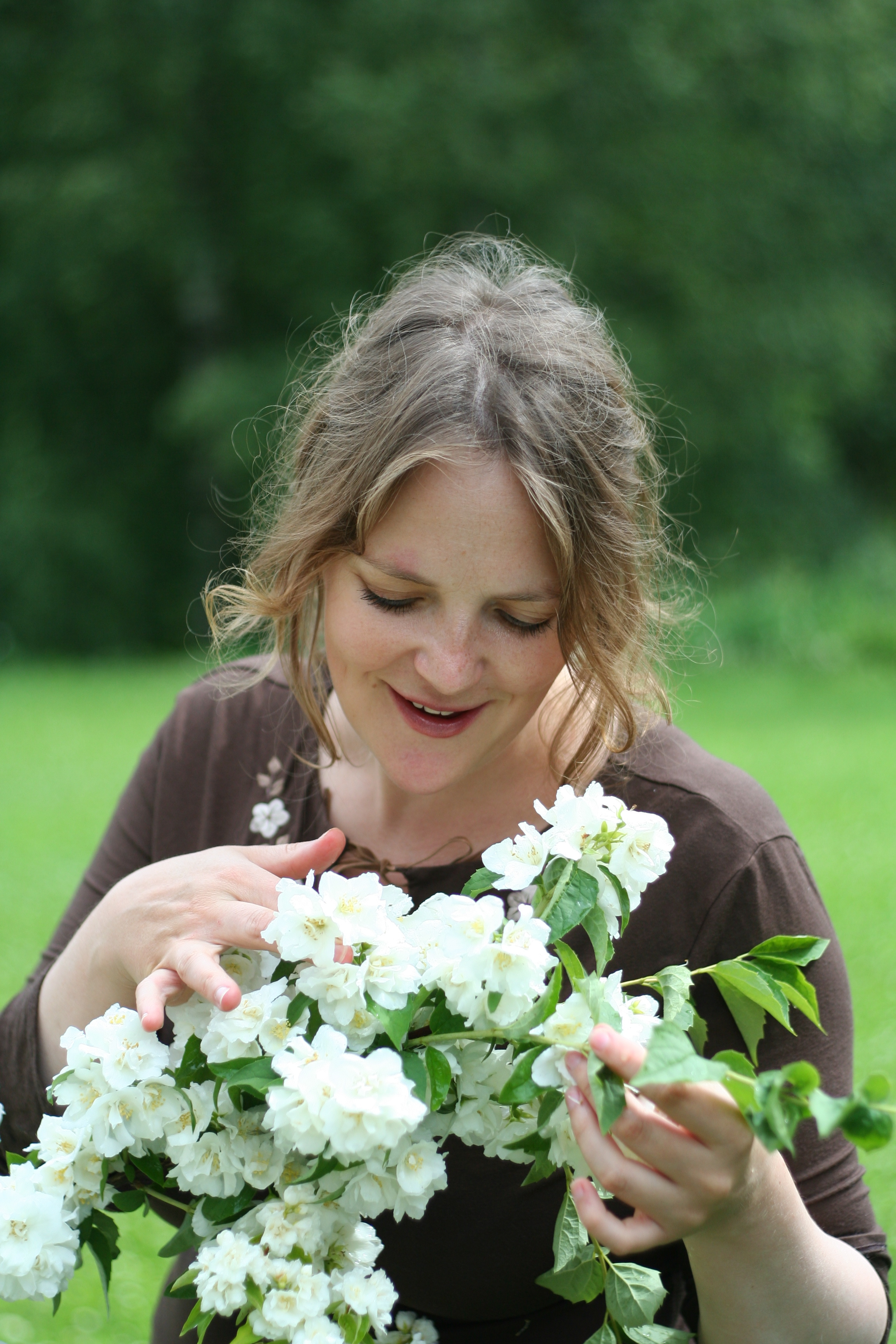
Hedvig Hanson

Hedvig Hanson (born 22 April 1975) is an Estonian jazz vocalist.

Born in Tartu, Hedvig Hanson's mother is singer Novella Hanson and her father is actor and singer Tõnu Kilgas. Her half-sister is actress Piret Krumm. Hanson's paternal grandparents were Vanemuine actors Ellen Kaarma and Lembit Mägedi.

== Albums ==
- 1997 "Love For Sale" – Kaljuste Music Productions
- 2000 "Let Me Love You" – BIO Management
- 2001 "Tule mu juurde" – MT Holding
- 2003 "What Colour Is Love" – Emarcy / Universal
- 2004 "Nii õrn on öö" – MT Holding Ltd.
- 2005 "You Bring Me Joy" – Universal
- 2006 "Ema laulud" – Music Maker
- 2008 "Kohtumistund" – Music Maker
- 2009 "Armastuslaulud" – Music Maker
- 2011 "Tants kestab veel" – Music Maker
- 2013 "Esmahetked" – Music Maker
- 2015 "Ilus elu" – Music Maker
- 2017 "Talvine soojus" – Music Maker

== Awards ==
- Estonian Radio Award, Musician of the Year (2003)
- Estonian Music Awards, Female and Jazz Artist of the Year (2001)
- Estonian Music Awards, Female and Jazz Artist of the Year (2004)
- Estonian Music Awards, Jazz Artist of the Year (2009)
- Estonian Music Awards, Jazzalbum of the Year (2013)
