= Siiri Sisask =

Estonian singer, stage and film actress, and politician

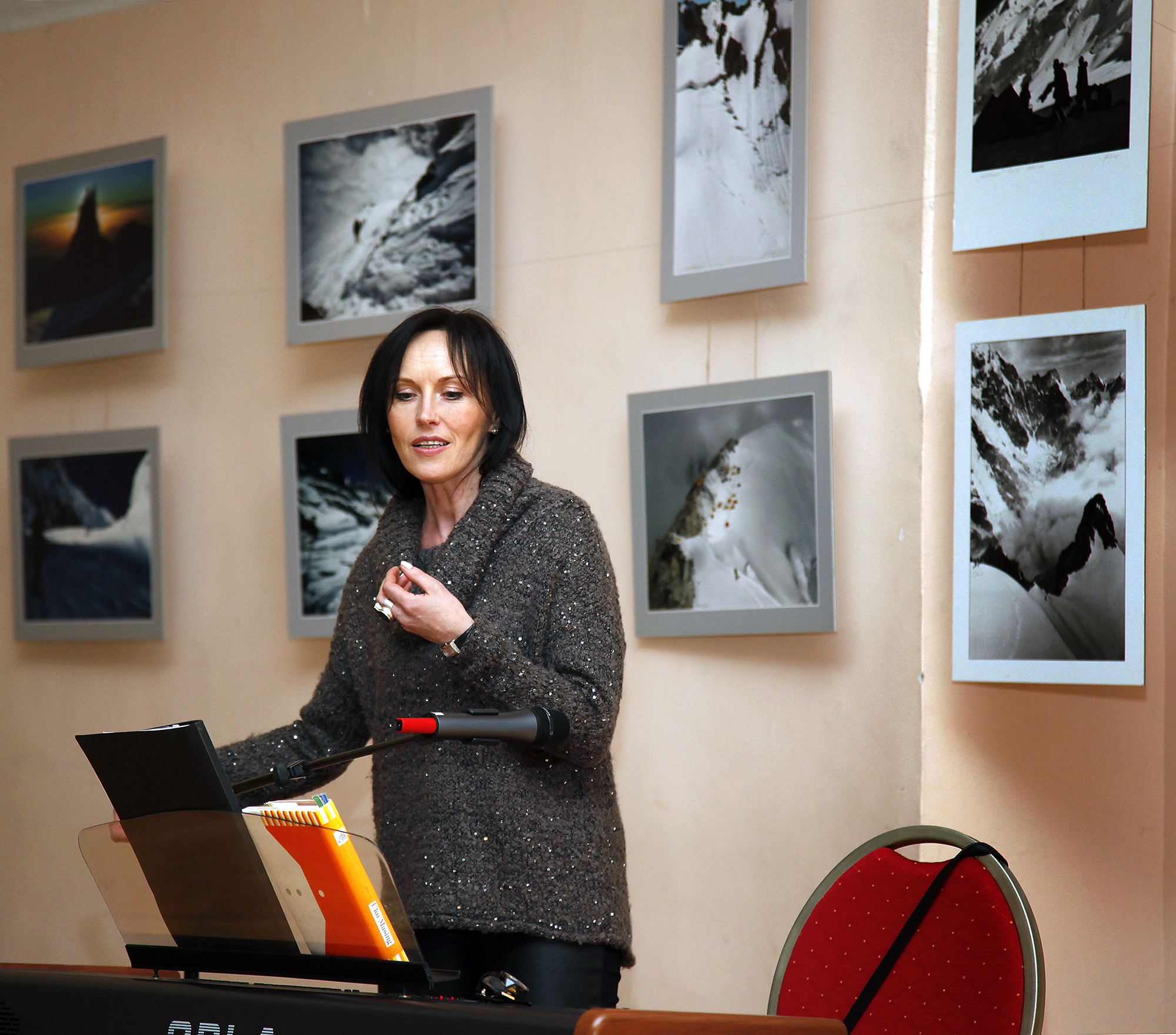
Siiri Sisask in 2014

Siiri Sisask (born 21 September 1968) is an Estonian singer, stage and film actress, and politician.

Sisask was born in Rapla. Her older brother was composer Urmas Sisask. She was a member of X Riigikogu, representing the Res Publica Party.

She has been a member of several notable musical collectives, including:

- 1986: T-Klaas ensemble – lead singer
- 1987: Ruja ensemble – lead singer
- 1988: Vitamiin ensemble – lead singer
- Ultima Thule – lead singer.

== Solo discography ==
- Hold Me, Wind/We'll Meet Another Time (1996)
- 1st Acoustic Graffiti (1996)
- Mis maa see on (1998)
- Jälg (2002)
- Laulud hingest... (with the Revalia Kammermeeskoor; 2003)
- Ürg ja jõud (2003)
- We've Been A While (2003)
- Kuu lõhn (2005)
- Teine jälg (2006)
- Taarka (2008)
- 11 (2011)
- Lingua mea (2010)
- Hommikupuu (2012)
- Kuristi kohal (2016)

== Filmography ==
- Arabella, mereröövli tütar (1982)
- Karoliine hõbelõng (1985)
- Naerata ometi (1985)
- Õnnelind flamingo (1986)
- Varastatud kohtumine (1989)
- Taarka (2008)
