= Eino Baskin =

Estonian actor and theatre director

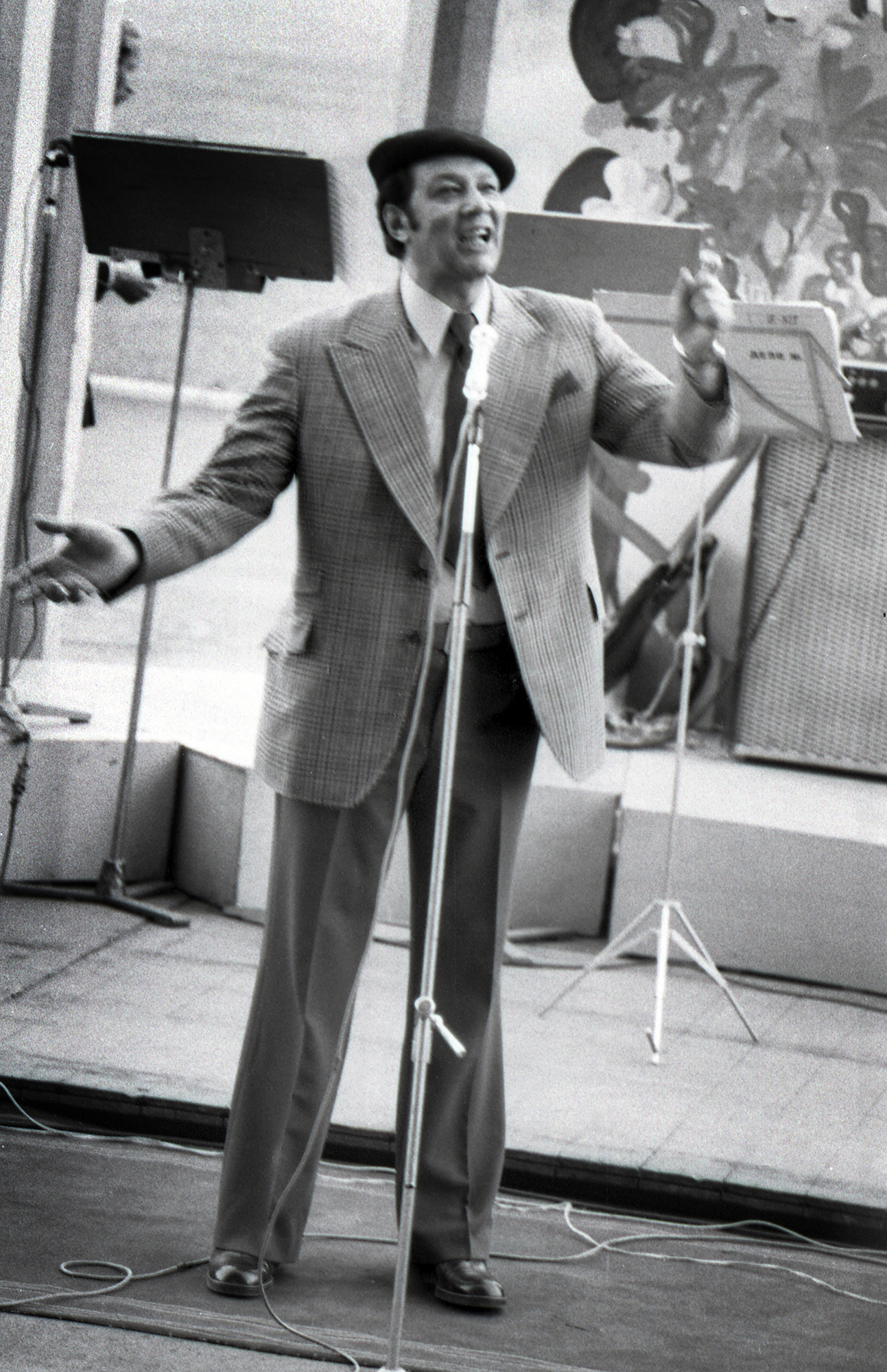
Baskin in 1974

Eino Baskin (17 June 1929 – 11 March 2015) was an Estonian actor and theatre director.

Baskin was born in Tallinn to Jewish parents Hirsch and Maria Baskin (née Raage). In 1951 he graduated from Estonian State Theater Institute before becoming engaged at the Estonian Drama Theatre.

In 1980 he established Vanalinnastuudio and for a long time he was its director. When Vanalinnastuudio was closed, he established Old Baskin's Theater.

== Personal life ==
In 1954, he married actress Ita Ever. Their son was actor and director Roman Baskin. The couple later divorced. He married his second wife, Galina Dõrdina 1961, with whom he had a daughter who died in infancy. The couple remained married for 38 years, until Dõrdina's death in 1999. In 2000, he married Veera Toll. The couple remained married until Baskin's death in Tallinn in 2015. Baskin also had a daughter, actress Katrin Pärn, from a relationship with actress, theologian and politician Malle Pärn in 1977.

== Selected filmography ==
- Tagahoovis (1957)
- Juhuslik kohtumine (1961)
- Bonycrone and Captain Drum (1978)
- Kolm rubiini (1978)
- Murder on the 31st Floor Part I (1979)
- Teisikud (1982)
- The Triangle (1982)
- Õnne 13 (1993–2010)
- Fox Woman (2002)
- Õpetajate tuba (2003)
- The Visit of the Old Lady (2006)
- ENSV (2010)

Source: EFIS
