= Nikolai Baturin =

Estonian novelist and playwright (1936–2019)

Nikolai Baturin (5 August 1936 – 16 May 2019) was an Estonian award-winning novelist and playwright.

== Biography and career ==
Baturin was born in the village of Arumetsa in Suislepa Parish (now the village of Maltsa, Viljandi Parish), Viljandi County. His father was a fisherman. After attending high school, military service took him for five years to the Caspian oil-fields and the Atlantic Ocean; for fifteen years he was a hunter in the Siberian taiga. For six years he participated in various geological expeditions.

Baturin debuted with a collection of poetry, Maa-alused järved (Underground Lakes, 1968), in the last wave of the "cassette" generation in the 1960s. In addition to fiction, he has written plays, poetry, screenplays, and essays. He has illustrated his own books and produced his own plays. His works have been translated into Russian, Ukrainian, and Lithuanian. He became a member of the Estonian Writers' Union in 1973.

Baturin lived at his home farm by Lake Võrts.

== Bibliography ==
=== Collections of poetry ===
- Blue Reign, 1990 (4000).
- The Silence of the Pole. The Pole of Silence, 1980 (3000).
- The Gallery, 1977 (4000)
- The Flight of the Stork, 1975 (5000).
- From the Squares and from the Fields, 1972 (4000).
- The Lyrefish, 1972 (4000).
- Underground Lakes, 1968 (12,000).

=== Novels, short stories and prose poems ===
- The Centaur, 2003
- Apocalypse Anno Domini, 1997 (1000)
- Caught in a Vicious Circle, 1996 (2000).
- Timid Nikas, the Comber of Lions' Manes, 1993 (10,000).
- A Murder at the Lighthouse, 1993 (16,000)
- The Heart of the Bear, 1989 (16,000).
- Early Ice, 1985 (25,000).
- Forests Spreading Far and Wide:a prose poem, 1981 (5000)
- Somersaults (prose poem, short story, drama), 1980 (8000)
- Echo Finds, 1977 (28,000).
- King of the King's Cabin, 1976 (28,000).
- The Oasis, 1973 (23,000).
- At an Early Late Hour: a prose poem, 1973 (20,000).

=== Screenplays ===
- Timid Nikas, the Comber of Lions' Manes, 1999.
- A Murder at the Lighthouse, 1994.
- The Heart of the Bear (in seven instalments), 1993.
- Summer Snowstorms, 1992.

=== Dramas ===
- A Ghost in the Cupboard, 1993 (5000).
- The Diamond Path, 1986 (5000)
- A Dwarf on the Cothurns
