= Yamburgsky Uyezd =

Former subdivision of the Russian Empire

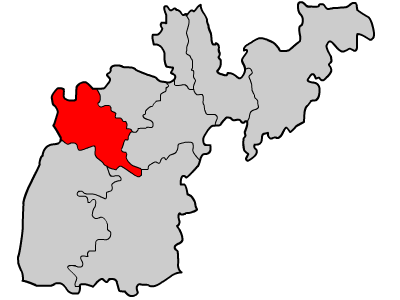

Yamburgsky Uyezd (Russian: Ямбургский уезд) was one of the eight subdivisions of the Saint Petersburg Governorate of the Russian Empire. Its capital was Yamburg (Kingisepp). Yamburgsky Uyezd was located in the westernmost part of the governorate (the westernmost part of present-day Leningrad Oblast together with the city of Narva, which is part of Estonia).

== Demographics ==
At the time of the Russian Empire Census of 1897, Yamburgsky Uyezd had a population of 81,972. Of these, 50.9% spoke Russian, 21.9% Estonian, 14.2% Finnish, 7.8% Ingrian, 2.6% German, 0.9% Polish, 0.8% Yiddish, 0.3% Votic, 0.2% Latvian, 0.1% English and 0.1% Romani as their native language.
