= Rain Simmul =

Estonian actor (born 1965)

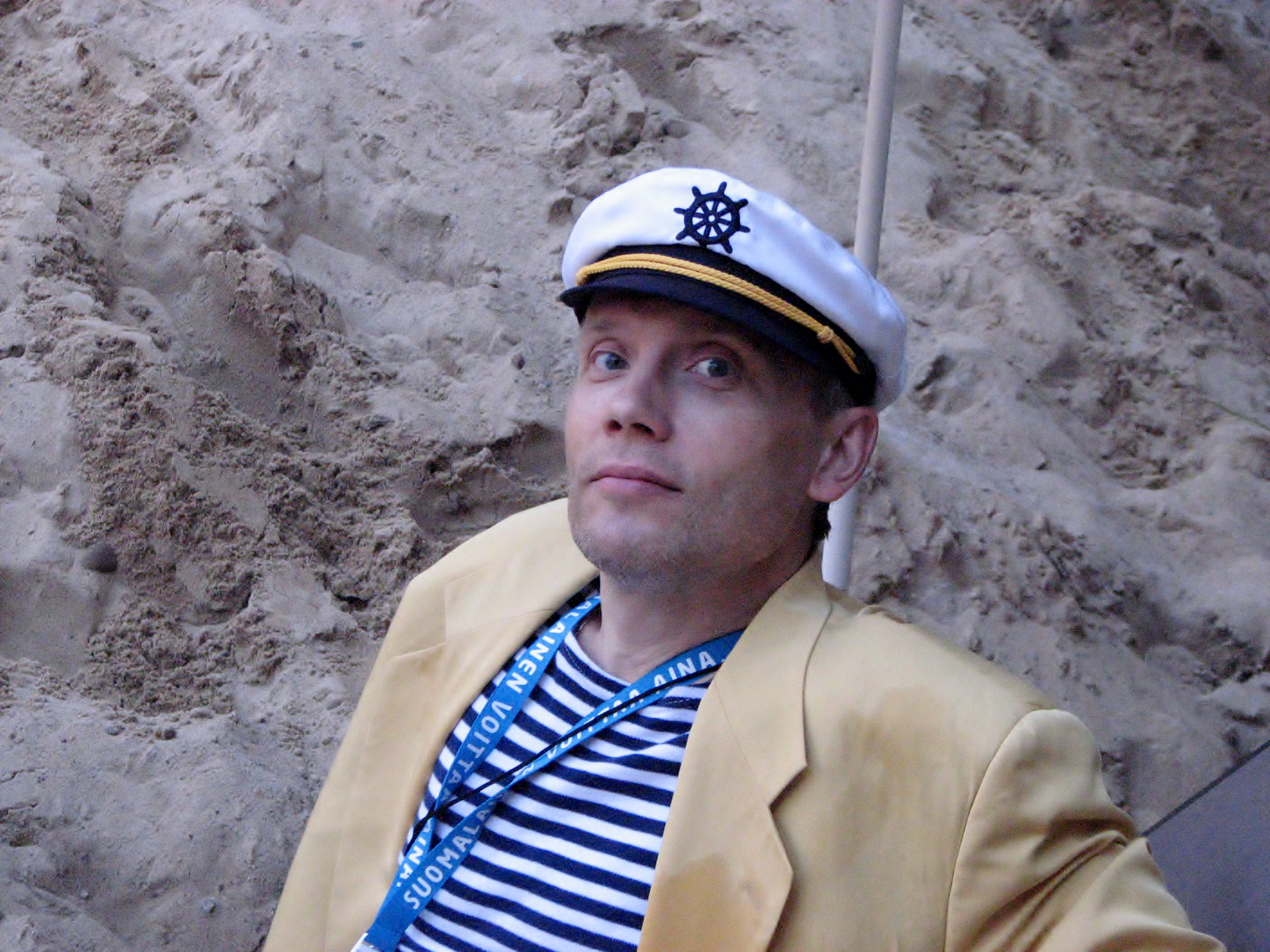
Rain Simmul in 2012

Rain Simmul (born 18 August 1965) is an Estonian actor.

Rain Simmul was born in Tartu. In 1988 he graduated from the Tallinn State Conservatory's Performing Arts Department. 1988–1999 he worked at Vanemuine Theatre. Since 1999 he is working at Tallinn City Theatre.

== Selected filmography ==
- Surmatants (1991)
- Need vanad armastuskirjad (1992)
- Karu süda (2001)
- Täna öösel me ei maga (2004)
- August 1991 (2005)
- Vana daami visiit (2006)
- Meeletu (2006)
- Detsembrikuumus (2008)
- Pangarööv (2009)
- Thibaut (2009)
- Kirjad Inglile (2011)
- Surnuaiavahi tütar (2011)
- 1944 (2015)
- Vehkleja (2015)
- Polaarpoiss (2016)
- Räägitakse, et tomatid armastavad rokkmuusikat (2016)
- Naine on süüdi (2017)
- Tuliliilia (2018)
- Apteeker Melchior. Viirastus (2022)
- Estonia (2023)
- Nähtamatu võitlus (2023)
- Vari (2024)

source: EFIS
