= Leida Laius =

Estonian film director

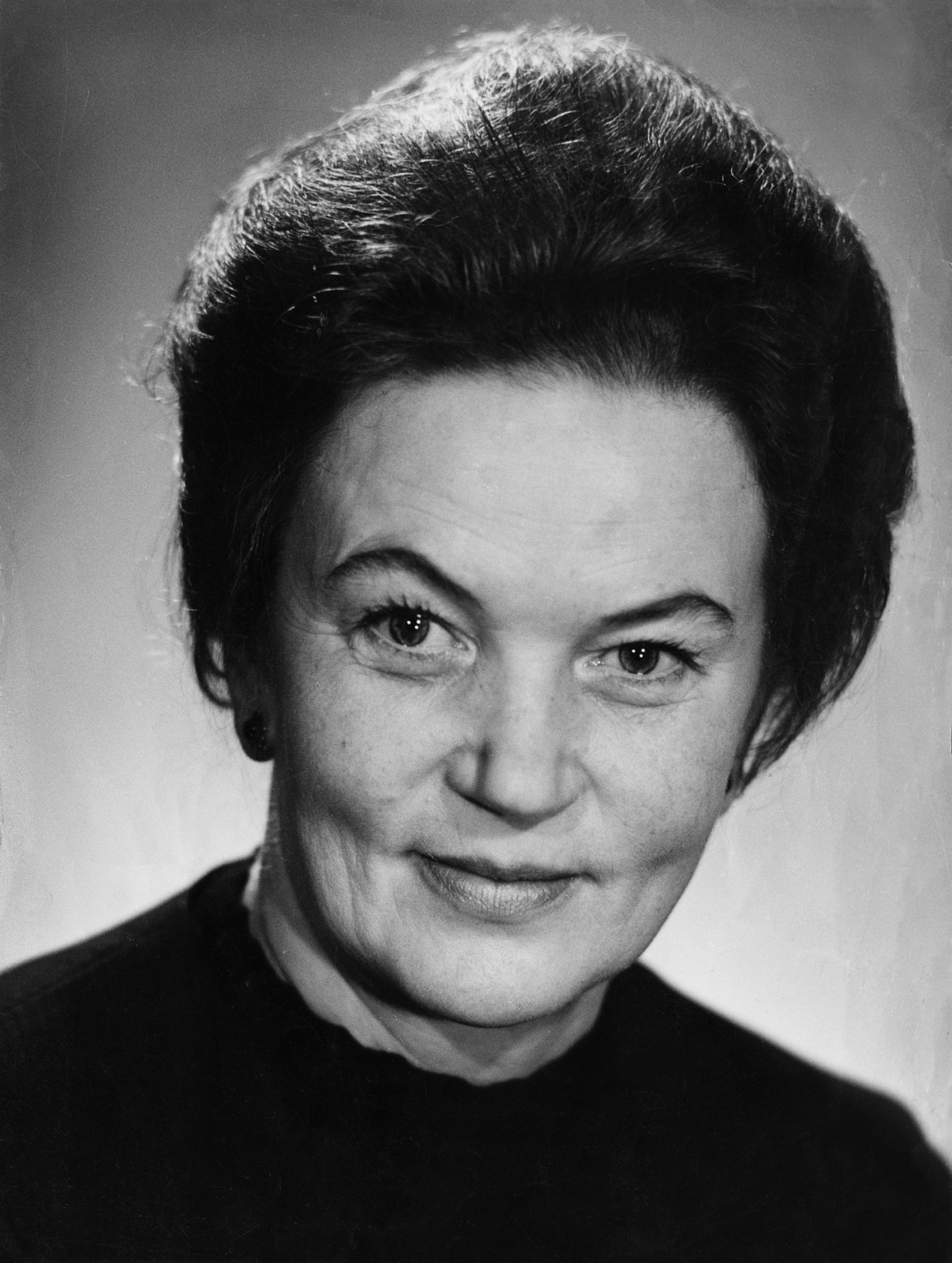
- Leida Laius (1970)
- Born: 26 March 1923; Horoshevo, Yamburgsky Uyezd, Russian SFSR, Soviet Union
- Died: 6 April 1996 (aged 73); Tallinn, Estonia
- Resting place: Pärnamäe Cemetery, Tallinn
- Education: Gerasimov Institute of Cinematography
- Known for: Film director
- Notable work: Naerata ometi, Varastatud kohtumine
- Awards: UNICEF-Prize of the Berlin International Film Festival (1987), Prix Graine de Cinéphage, Festival International de Films de Femmes, Créteil (1990)

Leida Laius (26 March 1923 – 6 April 1996) was an Estonian film director. She is widely received as one of the most renowned filmmakers in Estonian cinema. In 1995 she was honored by the Estonian Cultural Foundation with the Lifetime Achievement Award in special recognition of her contributions to the cultural history of Estonia.

== Life ==
Leida Laius was born in Horoshevo, Yamburgsky Uyezd into an Estonian farming family and grew up in Jamburg, later renamed Kingisepp, near Saint Petersburg. Her mother Armanda (née Sepp) came from an upper-middle-class family in Narva. Her father Richard was deported to a labor camp as a kulak during the Stalin era in the late 1930s and executed there as part of the so-called Great Purge.

Leida Laius volunteered for the Red Army during World War II and served as a nurse in the field hospital for the lightly wounded No. 3826 of the 22nd Army and as a librarian. She was a member of the Komsomol and a non-commissioned officer in the administrative service. For her military service, she was awarded the Medal "For Battle Merit" in 1944, the Medal "For the Victory over Germany in the Great Patriotic War 1941–1945" in 1945 and the Order of the Patriotic War second Class in 1985.

After the Soviet reoccupation of Estonia in 1944, she came to Tallinn. From 1945 to 1947 she worked as an inspector in the Ministry of Food Industry, from 1947 to 1949 as an official in the office of the Architects' Association and from 1950 to 1951 as an inspector in the theater department of the Estonian Ministry of Culture.

During this time, she trained to be an actress at the Estonian Theater Institute, which she completed in 1950. From 1951 to 1955, she was part of the ensemble at the Estonian Drama Theatre in Tallinn. From 1960, she worked at Tallinnfilm. In 1962, Laius graduated from the Gerasimov Institute of Cinematography (then the All-Union State Institute of Cinematography), the state film school in Moscow, with a diploma in directing. Laius submitted the short film Õhtust hommikuni (From Evening to Morning) as her diploma thesis. In the same year, she became a member of the Estonian Film Association.

In 1995, a year before her death, she was honored by the Estonian Cultural Foundation with the Lifetime Achievement Award. It is awarded in special recognition of a person's contribution to the cultural history of Estonia.

Laius died in Tallinn on 6 April 1996, age 73 and was buried next to her mother at Pärnamäe Cemetery in the Pirita district of Tallinn.

== Works ==
Leida Laius' feature films are characterized by an emphasis on the actors performance, for example Maria Klenskaja was awarded Best Actress in the role of Valentina Saar in the film Stolen Meeting (Varastatud kohtumine) at the All-Union Festival of Actors in Kaliningrad in 1989, and Hendrik Toompere jr. was awarded Best Male Actor in Games for Schoolchildren (Naerata ometi) at the Festival International de Films de Femmes (FIFF) in Créteil in 1987.

Her focus lies on strong female characters who face challenges in marriage and motherhood or find themselves in a classic dramatic love triangle of unrequited love and jealousy, i. e. as in Libahunt (1968). Games for Schoolchildren is a coming-of-age drama in which the main character Mari has to assert her place among her peers in a children's home and experiences her first love. The film was cast exclusively with non-professional actors and actresses and partly shot on original locations with a hand-held camera, which seems modern from today's perspective.

Leida Laius' last film, Stolen Meeting (Varastatud kohtumine), focuses on the subject of motherhood. After being released from prison, Valentina returns to Estonia in search of her son Jüri. Valentina left Jüri in a children's home after he was born, but he is now living with a foster family in Tartu, where he is doing well. She believes that she can get her life back on track if she regains custody of her child. However, having grown up in an orphanage herself, she eventually has to face the harsh reality that her desire makes not for the best life choice for her son. The director herself described the film as a conceptual sequel to Naerata ometi.

Eva Näripea, the director of the Estonian Film Archives, compared Leida Laius's films to the new narrative forms of the so-called "Thaw Cinema", an era of a new wave of cinema of the 1960s in the Soviet Union. The Estonian film critic Olev Remsu rated the film Libahunt as one of the ten best films of Estonian cinema.

== Recognition ==
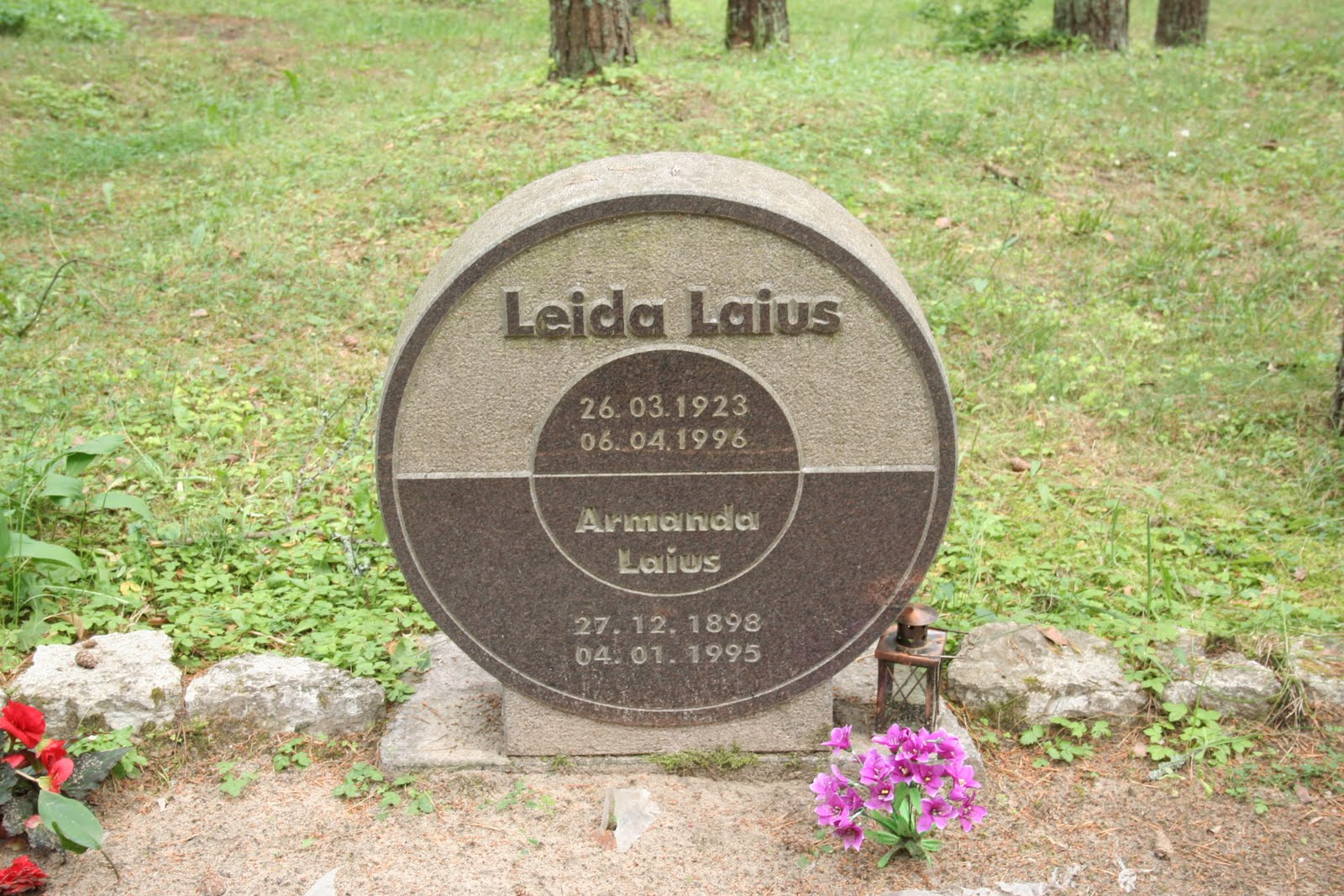
Leida and Armanda Laius's Gravesite at Pärnamäe Cemetery in Tallinn

Jüri Sillart, who worked as a cinematographer on Varastatud kohtumine, Laius' last film, released a documentary about the film director in 2002, titled Leida's Story (original title: Kairiin).

On the occasion of her 100th birthday in 2023, an extensive retrospective of Leida Laius' life and work was held in Tallinn and Tartu, including film screenings, discussion events and exhibitions of set photographs from the Estonian National Archives' collection in the Elektriteatri and Sõprus cinemas. Her films were also made available on streaming platforms. In this context, a monument dedicated to her and created by the sculptor Flo Kasearus was unveiled in Lembitu Park in Tallinn on March 26, 2023.

The Estonian Film Museum presented a year-long exhibition titled Leida Laius. Lõpetamata naeratus (″Leida Laius. The Unfinished Smile″), which opened on March 31, 2023. On display were materials and objects from the film collection of the Estonian National Archives from Laius's private life and her film sets, which had not been accessible to the public until then. These included documents and materials from the planning phase of her films to their realization, screening and reception.

The 57th Karlovy Vary International Film Festival 2023 screened the film Stolen Meeting (Varastatud kohtumine) in the Out of the Past series. The film had been restored in 2022 with the support of A Season of Classic Films, an initiative of the Association des Cinémathèques Européennes, which is part of the Creative Europe MEDIA program.

The 75th Berlin International Film Festival 2025 will once again screen the film Games for Schoolchildren (Naerata ometi), which had won an award at the 1987 edition of the festival, in a 4K digitized and restored version as part of the Berlinale Classics series. The Estonian National Archives digitized the feature film on behalf of the Estonian Film Institute.

The 54th Festival La Rochelle Cinema 2026 will provide a retrospective of Leida Laius' works notably including screenings of Sündis Inimene, Lapsepõlv and Kodulinna Head Vaimud courts as well as Libahunt, Ukuaru, Kõrboja Peremees, Naerata Ometi and Varastatud Kohtumine films.

== Filmography ==
- Õhtust hommikuni (short film, 1962)
- Mäed kui valged elevandid (1963)
- Mäeküla piimamees (1965)
- Libahunt (1968)
- Ukuaru (1973)
- Sündis inimene (documentary, 1975)
- Lapsepõlv (documentary, 1976)
- Jäljed lumel (documentary, 1978)
- Kõrboja peremees (1979)
- Kodulinna head vaimud (documentary, 1983)
- Naerata ometi (1985) (with Arvo Iho)
- Varastatud kohtumine (1988)

== Awards (Selection) ==
- 1995: Lifetime Achievement Award of the Estonian Cultural Foundation

Naerata ometi

- 1986 Grand Prize at the All-Union Film Festival in Alma Ata
- 1986 Best Feature Film and Best Children's and Youth Film at the Soviet-Estonian Film Festival
- 1987 Berlin International Film Festival — UNICEF prize
- 1990 Prix Graine de Cinéphage, Festival International de Films de Femmes (FIFF), Créteil

Varastatud kohtumine

- 1989: Best Feature Film at the 5th Women in Film Festival and the presentation of the Lillian Gish Awards, held at the Directors Guild of America, Los Angeles
- 1990: Best Feature Film, Festival of Female Film Directors, Venice
