= Urmas Sisask =

Estonian composer (1960–2022)

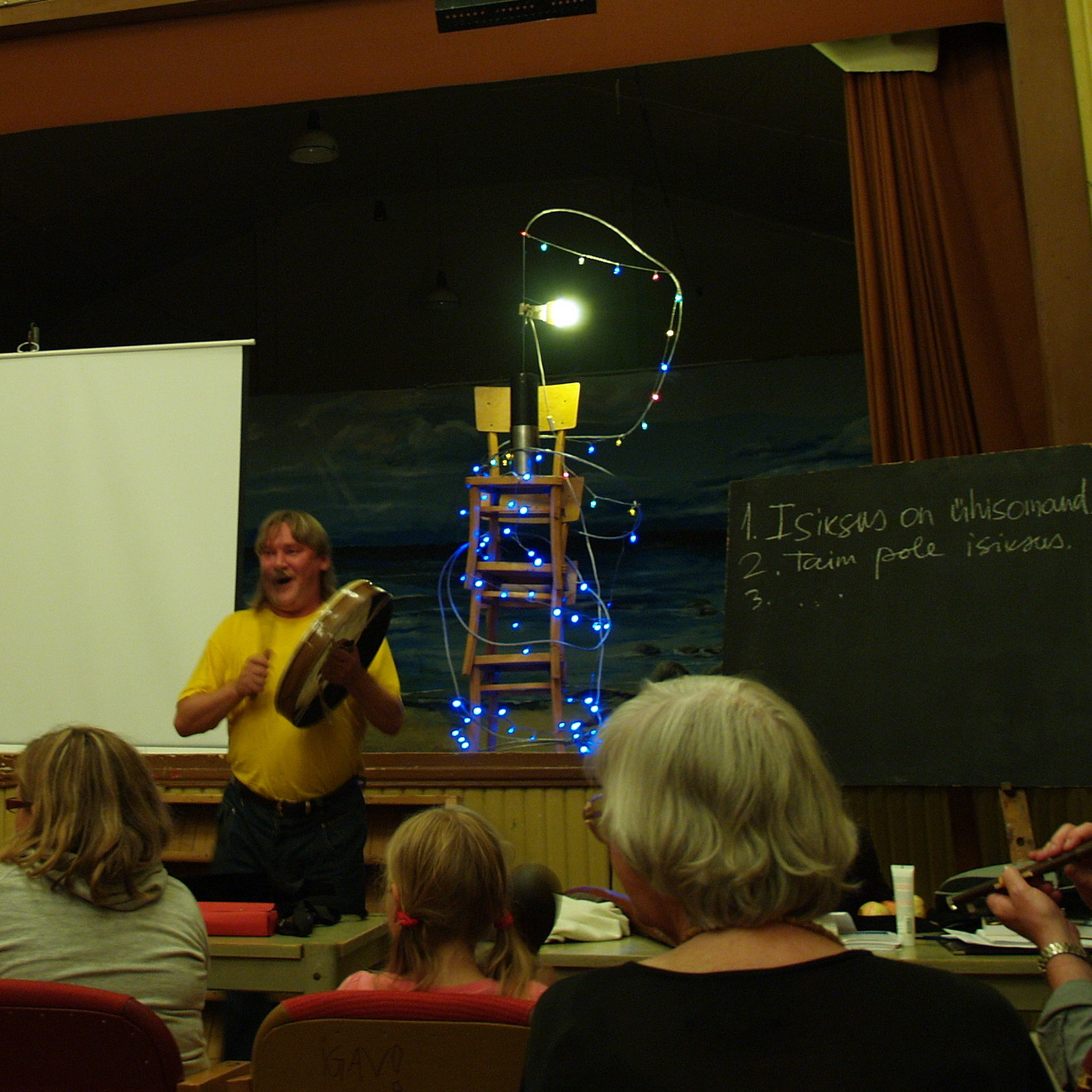
- Sisask in 2011
- Born: September 9, 1960; Rapla, Estonia
- Died: December 17, 2022 (aged 62); Estonia
- Occupation: Composer
- Notable work: *Starry Sky Cycle* (1980–1987); *Gloria Patri* (1988); *Milky Way* (1990)
- Relatives: Siiri Sisask (sister)

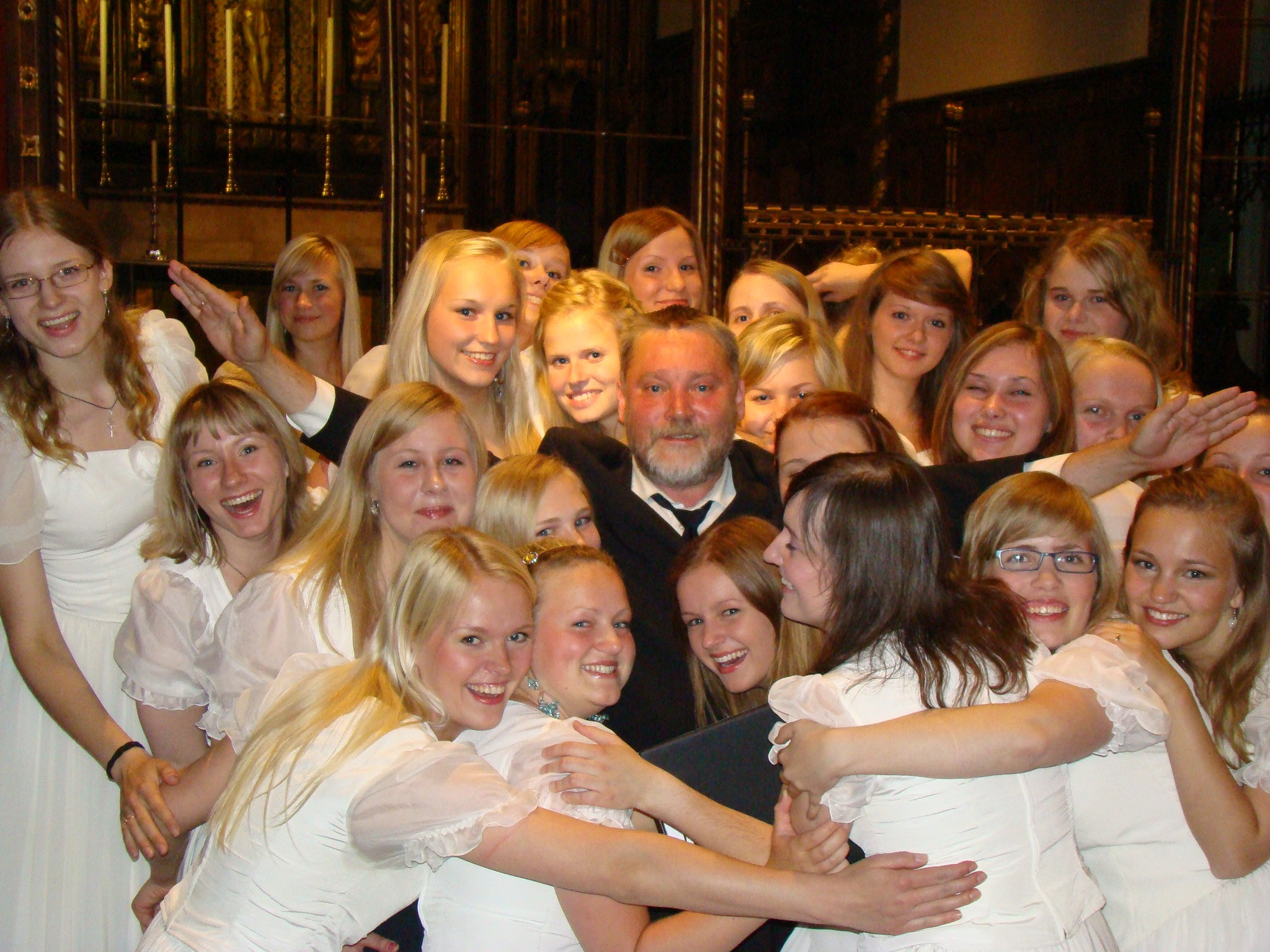
Estonian TV Girls' Choir with Urmas Sisask at St Paul's cathedral in London, 2008.

Urmas Sisask (9 September 1960 – 17 December 2022) was an Estonian composer.

== Biography ==
Sisask was born in Rapla on 9 September 1960. One of the major inspirations for his music was astronomy. Based on the trajectories of the planets in the Solar System, he created the "planetal scale", a mode consisting of the pitches C#, D, F#, G#, and A. Later, he discovered to his surprise that this was exactly the same as the Japanese Kumajoshi mode, which is also known as the Japanese pentatonic scale.

Sisask was a Roman Catholic, and much of what he composed was sacred music. His younger sister is singer and actress Siiri Sisask.

Sisask died on 17 December 2022, at the age of 62.

== Discography ==
- Starry Sky Cycle (Estonian: "Tähistaeva tsükkel") (1980–1987)
- Gloria Patri (1988)
- Pleiads ("Plejaadid") (1989)
- Milky Way ("Linnutee galaktika") (1990)
- Andromeda ("Andromeda galaktika") (1991)
- Benedictio (for mixed chorus) (1991)
- Christmas oratorio ("Jõuluoratoorium") (1992)
- Magnificat
- Missa Nr. 1
- Symbiotic Symphony ("Sümbiootiline Sümfoonia")
- Comet Hyakutake
- Ave Sol
- Missa Nr. 4 op. 46: Christmas mass ("Jõulumissa")
- Polaris ("Põhjanael")
- Veni Sancte Spiritus
