= Katrin Karisma =

Estonian actress, singer, and politician

Katrin Karisma (also Katrin Karisma-Krumm; born on 21 August 1947) is an Estonian actress, singer and politician. She was a member of XI Riigikogu.

Karisma born in Tallinn. She was married first to actor Peeter Jakobi and then to opera singer Hendrik Krumm. She has three children: a son Ivo Krumm and daughters Mari Krumm and actress Piret Krumm. Piret Krumm is from her relationship with actor and singer Tõnu Kilgas.

She has been a member of Estonian Reform Party.
