= Peeter Jakobi =

Estonian actor

Peeter Jakobi (15 October 1940 — 21 September 2014) was an Estonian actor.

Jakobi was born in Tallinn. In 1968 he graduated from the Tallinn State Conservatory's Performing Arts Department. From 1973 until 2008, he was an actor at the Rakvere Theatre. Besides theatre roles he has played also in several films.

From 1966 until 1973, he was married to actress Katrin Karisma. The couple had a son, Ivo.

== Awards ==
- 2006: Kultuuripärl (given by Cultural Endowment of Estonia)

== Selected filmography ==
- 1969: Viimne reliikvia (feature film; in the role: Ivo Schenkenberg)
- 1971: Metskapten
- 1997: Minu Leninid
- 2004: Igavene reliikvia
- 2005: Libahundi needus
- 2005: Stiilipidu
- 2006: Vana daami visiit
- 2013: Elavad pildid
- 2017: Mehetapja/Süütu/Vari
