= Tänapäev =

Company based in Estonia

- Company type: Public (Aktsiaselts)
- Industry: Book publisher
- Founded: 1999
- Headquarters: Tallinn, Estonia
- Products: books
- Website: www.tnp.ee

Tänapäev is an Estonian publishing house established in 1999 and headquartered in Tallinn. The main subjects it publishes are translated and original fiction, history, politics, biographies and children literature. In the year 2000, Tänapäev published 45 books. It published 60 books in 2001, 70 books in 2002, 86 books in 2004, and in 2012, it published about 135 books. About 2/3 of titles are translations, 1/3 Estonian originals.

The most prominent series is called "The Red Book", which features authors like Oscar Wilde, Kurt Vonnegut, Albert Camus, Franz Kafka, Italo Calvino, Günter Grass, Ian McEwan, Lyudmila Ulitskaya, John Irving, Mikhail Bulgakov and many others, there are currently over 80 books in the series. Tänapäev also publishes several popular crime authors such as Boris Akunin, Robert van Gulik, Dashiell Hammett and Lindsey Davis. The non-fiction list includes many titles on history and politics, both from recent and ancient times. Authors include Norman Davies, Antony Beevor, Francis Fukuyama, Robert Graves, Bill Bryson and many others. In recent years Tänapäev has been the biggest publisher of Estonian poetry. "My First Book" is a popular series of original Estonian children's literature and there is also a separate series for young adult readers. Prominent series also include albums of old postcards and photos of landmarks in Estonia, "Golden Biographies" focuses on lives of culturally or historically significant persons.

Tänapäev is the main organizer of literature competitions in Estonia. It is organizing competitions for children and young adult books and also a novel competition, which has been held twice so far.

Tänapäev publishing house has organized novel competitions. The first was won by Angela Hofberg with the novel "Ikkagi", the second by Avo Kull with the novel "Hospital" and the third by Janka Leis with the novel "Vihmasaattjat".
