= Egon Rannet =

Estonian writer (1911–1983)

Egon Rannet (until 1940 Eugen/Jevgeni Brükke; 29 November 1911 – 1 November 1983) was a Soviet and Estonian writer, playwright and screenwriter. Many of his works were affected by socialist realism.

He was born in Tallinn. In the 1930s he was a member of Vaps Movement. During World War II he was in Soviet military service. Since 1947 he was a professional writer.

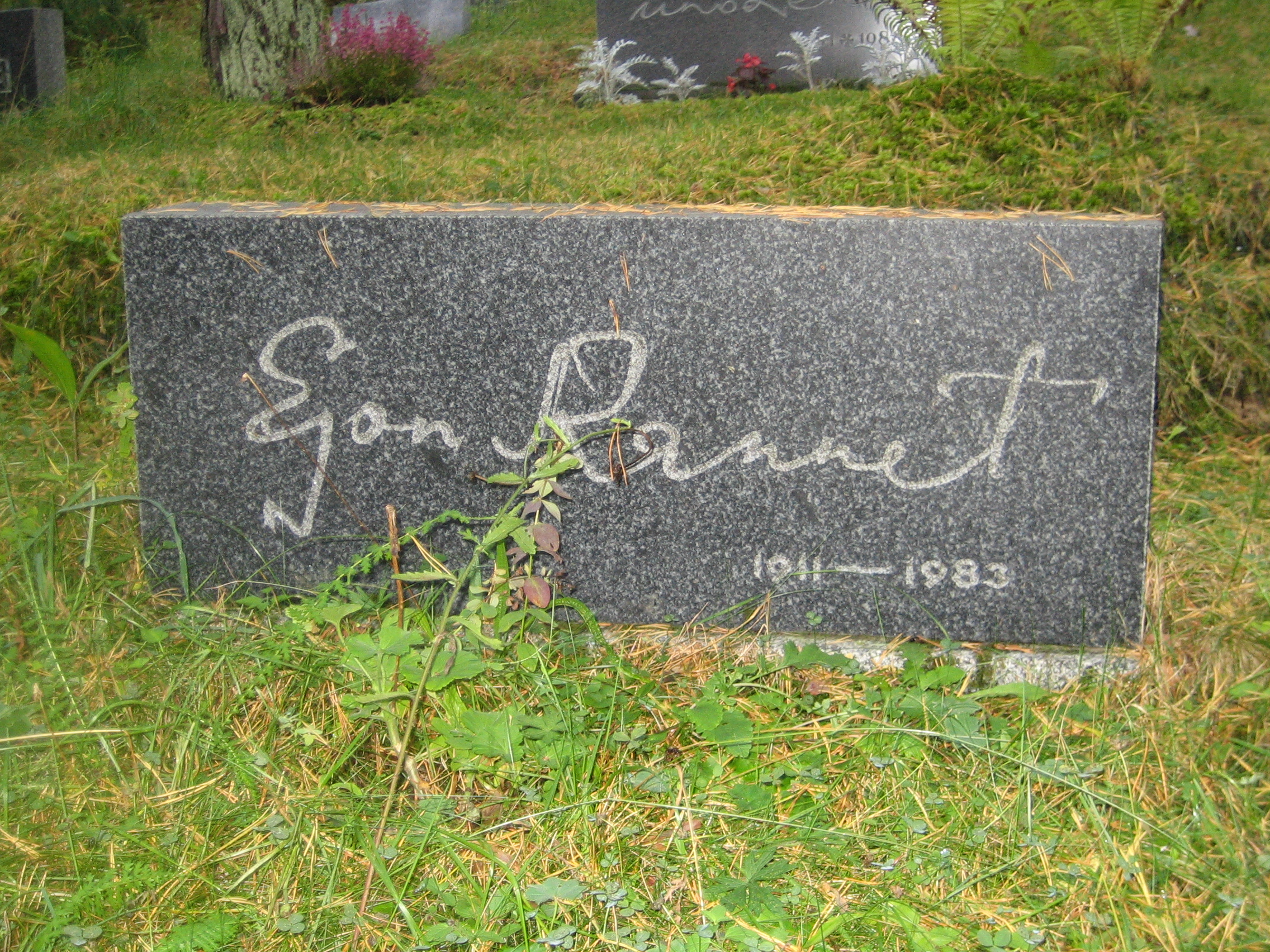
Grave of Egon Rannet in Metsakalmistu

== Works ==
- novel "Kivid ja leib" (I 1972, II 1985, III 1992, IV 1996)
- short story "Tugevate tee" (1954)
- short story "Kilde Taani-reisilt" (1960)
