= Ita Ever =

Estonian actress (1931–2023)

- Ita Ever
- Born: Ilse Ever; 1 April 1931; Paide, Estonia
- Died: 9 August 2023 (aged 92); Tallinn, Estonia
- Occupation: Actress

Ita Ever (born Ilse Ever; 1 April 1931 – 9 August 2023) was an Estonian film, radio, theatre, and television actress. She has been described as a Grand Old Lady of Estonian theatre.

Ever began her career in 1953 as a stage actress, and appeared in numerous Estonian and Russian film productions. She was formerly married to Estonian actor Eino Baskin and is the mother of director and actor Roman Baskin.

In 1983, she starred as Miss Marple in Secret of the Blackbirds (Russian: Тайна «Чёрных дроздов», Tayna chyornykh drozdov), the Russian language film adaptation of Agatha Christie's novel A Pocket Full of Rye.

Ever appeared in stage and film productions based on the works of Oskar Luts, A. H. Tammsaare, Mats Traat, Agatha Christie, Nikolai Gogol, William Shakespeare, John Steinbeck, Henrik Ibsen, and Anton Chekhov.

Ever died on 9 August 2023, at the age of 92.
