= Kalju Komissarov =

Estonian actor, theatre and film director

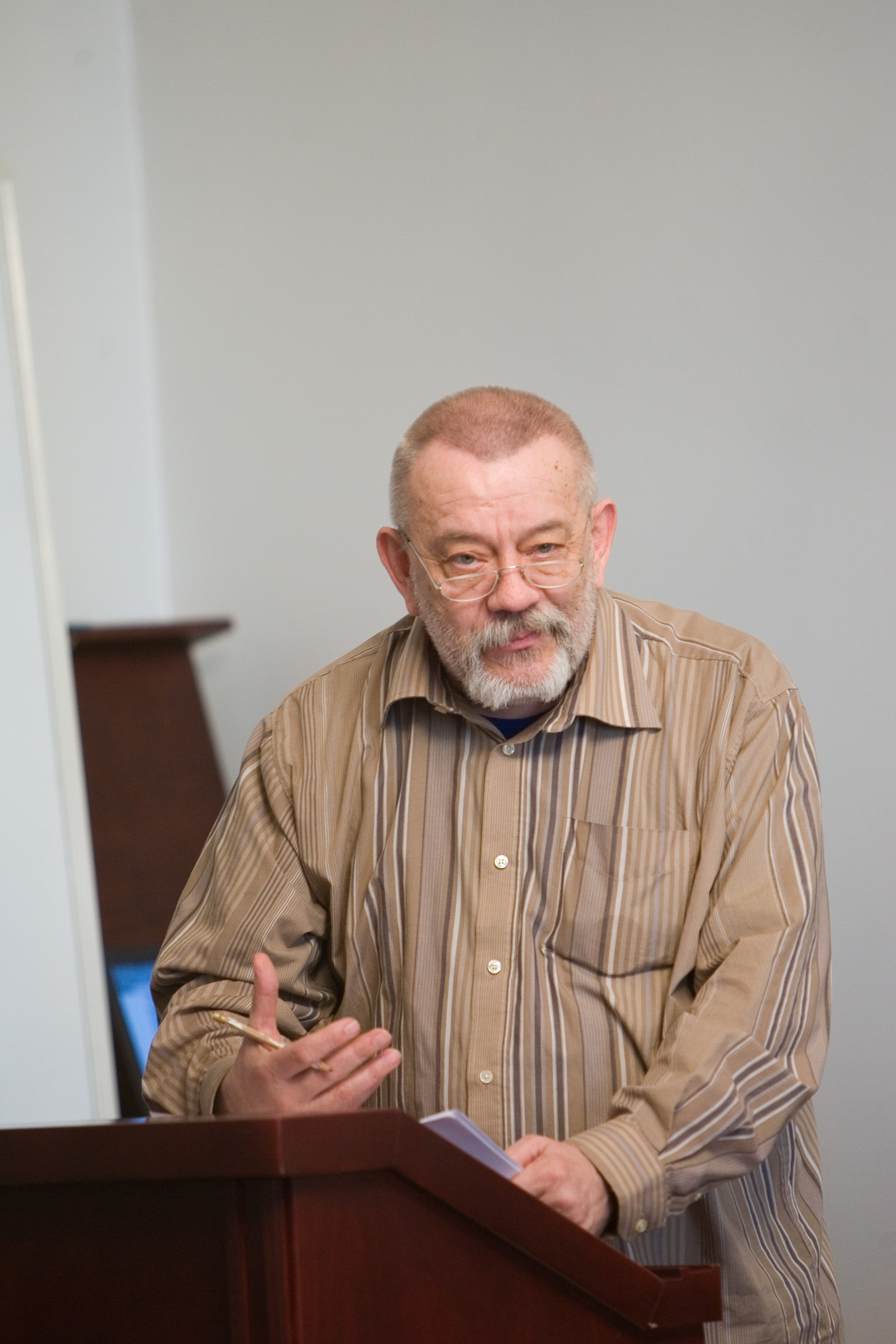
Kalju Komissarov in 2007

Kalju Komissarov (8 March 1946 Võru – 6 March 2017) was an Estonian actor, theatre and film director, and theatre pedagogue.

In 1968, he graduated from Tallinn State Conservatory. From 1968-1974, he worked as a film director at Tallinnfilm. From 1974-1986, he was the principal stage manager at Noorsooteater, and from 1986-1988, at Ugala Theatre. From 1986-1995, he was the head of the Estonian Music and Theatre Academy's Higher Theatre School (Estonian: Eesti Muusikaakadeemia Kõrgem Lavakunstikool).

In 2006, he was awarded with Order of the White Star, III class.

Komissarov was married to actress and former Tallinn State Conservatory classmate Helle-Reet Helenurm from 1967 to 1971.

== Selected filmography ==
- 1967 Keskpäevane praam (feature film; role: Boy in Moskvich)
- 1989 Viimne reliikvia (feature film; role: Monk)
- 1970 Valge laev (feature film; role: Enn Alling)
- 1971 Metskapten (feature film; role: ?)
- 1973 Tavatu lugu (feature film; role: Young inspector)
- 1980 Ideaalmaastik (feature film; role: Secretary of district committee)
- 1997 Minu Leninid (feature film; role: Russian gendarme official)
- 2006 Meeletu (feature film; role: Parish mayor)
- 2006-2012 Kelgukoerad (television series; role: Kelk)
