= Sulev Keedus =

Estonian film director (born 1957)

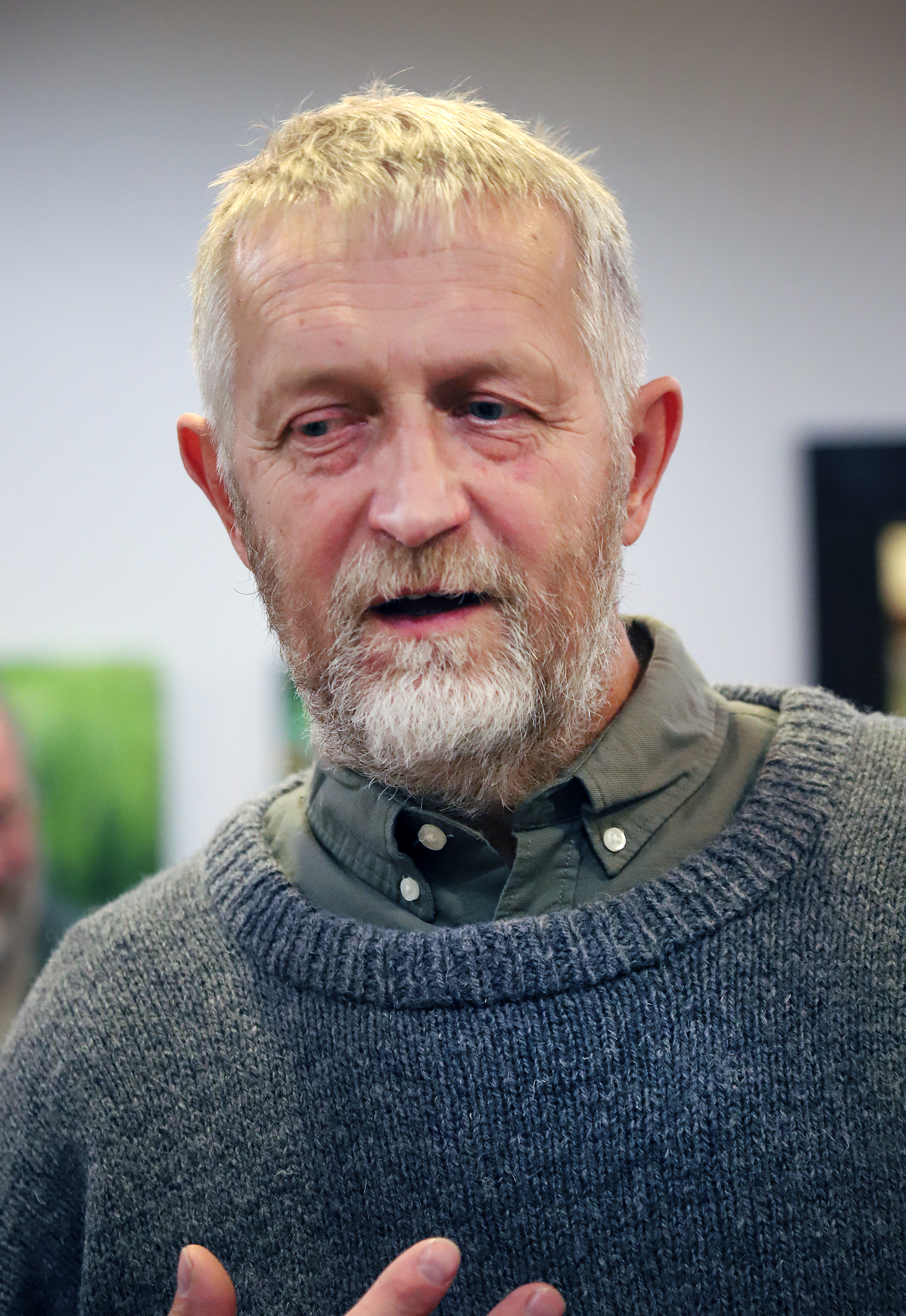
Keedus in 2022

Sulev Keedus (born 21 July 1957 in Tallinn) is an Estonian film director who studied at the Gerasimov Institute of Cinematography in Moscow.

== Selected filmography ==
- Luigeluum (1982)
- Ainus pühapäev (1990)
- Georgica (1998)
- Somnambulance (2003)
- A Family (2004)
- Tormis' Sledge of Song (2005)
- Ruudi (2006)
- Travelling Light (2006)
- Jonathan from Australia (2007)
- Letters to Angel (2011)
- The Russians on Crow Island (2012)
- The Manslayer/The Virgin/The Shadow (2017)
- War (2017)
- Kellamängumaastikud (2020)
