= Gunnar Kilgas =

Estonian actor and theatre director

Gunnar Kilgas (8 May 1926 in Narva – 6 August 2005 in Tallinn) was an Estonian actor and theatre director.

Kilgas graduated from Tallinna Reaalkool in 1944 and from the National Theatre Institute of the Estonian SSR in 1949, majoring in acting. He played in the first feature film made in the Estonian SSR "Life in the Citadel" (1947).

He then worked as an actor at the South Estonian Theatre (1949 – 1951), Vanemuis (1951 – 1960) and the Estonian Drama Theatre (1960 – 1969). In 1950–1951, Kilgas was an announcer at Estonian Radio.

In 1982, Kilga received the honorary title of meritorious artist of the Estonian SSR.

In the years 1969 to 1986, Kilgas was a director of television productions at Estonian Television . One of his best-known TV productions is "Rudolf and Irma", based on AH Tammsaare's novel "Elu ja ryųbų".

In the years 1987 to 1992, he worked at Vanalinnastudio as the director of the literary department, and in 1993 - 1995 as a director there. Kilgas has appeared inRadio Estonian Radio reading classes an, hestening games, he has also translated plays.

Since 1995, he was a freelancer.

== Filmography ==
- 1947 - Elu tsitadellis (feature film; role: Karl Miilas)
- 1957 - Pöördel (feature film; role: Raivo Kotkas)
- 1959 - Kutsumata külalised (feature film; role: Salusoo)
- 1971 - Valge laev (feature film; role: Ilmar Tomson)
- 1972 - Verekivi (feature film; role: Ducker)
- 1973 - Tuli öös (feature film; role: Form master)
- 1987 - Metsluiged (feature film; role: Father-King)
- 1988 - Vernanda (feature film; role: Windshield wiper)
- 1997 - Minu Leninid (feature film; role: German officer)
- 2008 - Nazis and Blondes (documentary; episodic role)
