= Roman Baskin =

Estonian actor and director (1954–2018)

Roman Baskin (25 December 1954 – 13 September 2018) was an Estonian actor and director of stage and screen.

His parents were Eino Baskin and Ita Ever. Baskin's credits as an actor included Lotte from Gadgetville (2006), 186 Kilometres (2007), Letters to Angel (2010), and The Idiot (2011). He directed Peace Street in 1991, and a television film adaptation of The Visit in 2006.

For his career in film, Baskin received the Order of the White Star, fourth class in 2018. He was diagnosed with cancer and died on 13 September 2018.
