= Inga Salurand =

Estonian actress

- Born: 1 August 1983 (age 42); Tartu, then part of Estonian SSR, Soviet Union
- Citizenship: Estonia
- Occupation: Actress
- Years active: 2005–present

Inga Salurand (born 1 August 1983) is an Estonian stage, film, and television actress whose career began in the mid-2000s.

== Early life and education ==
Inga Salurand was born and raised in Tartu, where she attended primary and secondary schools. In 2002, she enrolled in the Estonian Academy of Music and Theatre in Tallinn to study acting under instruction of Priit Pedajas, graduating in 2006. Among her graduating classmates were Risto Kübar, Lauri Lagle, Mari-Liis Lill, Laura Peterson, Ursula Ratasepp, Britta Vahur, and Sergo Vares.

== Career ==
=== Theatre ===
In 2006, just after Shortly after graduating from the Estonian Academy of Music and Theatre, Salurand began an engagement at Tallinn's Theatre NO99 that lasted until her departure in 2014. After a year working as a freelance actress, she began an engagement at the Estonian Drama Theatre in Tallinn, where she is still currently employed. Notable roles in theatre have been in works by such international playwrights and authors as: George Orwell, Anton Chekhov, Michael Cimino, Alfred Jarry, William Shakespeare, Harriet Beecher-Stowe, Rainer Werner Fassbinder, Stanisław Lem, A. R. Gurney, Marius Ivaškevičius, Yasmina Reza, and Tom Stoppard. Roles in works by Estonian authors and playwrights include those of: Helen Käit, Jaan Tooming, and Andrus Kivirähk.

=== Television ===
Salurand's career in television began in 2006, when she was cast in the role of Tuuli/Hele in an episode of the Eesti Televisioon (ETV) crime-drama Ohtlik lend. Later the same year, she became a regular cast member of the TV3 drama series Helena in the role of Triin. In 2008, she played the role of Silvia in the ETV twelve-part television historical-drama mini-series Tuulepealne maa. This was followed by the role of Katariina in the Kanal 2 drama series Saare sosinad between 2012 and 2013, which was filmed in on location in Madeira.

Other television roles include several appearances on the TV3 comedy-crime series Kättemaksukontor between 2009 and 2015, and as a cast member in the role of Kirsika Lehtonen on the 2015 ETV drama series Mustad lesed. In 2018 she joined the cast of the ETV ten-part drama series Pank as the character Kelli; which follows the rise and subsequent misfortunes of a new bank that which emerges in Estonia in the 1990s.

=== Film ===
In 2008, Salurand was cast in a starring role in the Ain Mäeots-directed Exitfilm biographical film Taarka, based on the play of the same name by Kauksi Ülle about the difficult life of Seto folk singer Hilana Taarka. Salurand played Hilana Taarka as a young woman and was one of three actresses to play the role of Taarka in the film at various stages of her life; Siiri Sisask portrayed older adult Taarka and Marje Metsur arjportrayed Taarka as an elderly woman. Taarka has the distinction of being the first feature-length film in the Seto dialect.

In 2010, she played a supporting role as Marju in the Andres Puustusmaa-directed Taska Film crime-thriller Punane elavhõbe and followed with the role of Ly in the 2016 Valentin Kuik and Manfred Vainokivi-directed drama Perekonnavaled for Filmivabrik. In 2018, she was cast in the role of Julia in former Estonian Academy of Music and Theatre classmate Lauri Lagle's directorial feature-film debut drama Portugal for Allfilm.

=== E-Courses ===
In addition to theatre, television, and film, Salurand has also appeared as an actress for Keeleklikk, an online language course for native English language and Russian language speakers who wish to learn the Estonian language, created by Marju Kõivupuu and Malle Rüütli in 2013.

== Personal life ==
Salurand currently lives in Tallinn whilst engaged as an actress at the Estonian Drama Theatre.
