= Risto Kübar =

Estonian theater, film, and voice actor

- Born: 4 December 1983 (age 42); Kose, Harju County, then part of Estonian SSR, Soviet Union
- Occupation: Actor
- Years active: 2004–present

Risto Kübar (born 4 December 1983) is an Estonian stage, voice, and film actor.

== Early life and education ==
Risto Kübar was born on 4 December 1983 in the small borough of Kose. His older brother is sidecar motocross racer Silver Kübar.

He attended Kose Secondary School from 1990 until 1999, followed by studies at the Tallinn Old Town Educational College (VHK), graduating in 2002. After graduation from VHK he was accepted to the Estonian Music and Theatre Academy of Dramatic Art (now, the Estonian Academy of Music and Theatre) where he studied in courses under the tutelage of actor and teacher Priit Pedajas, graduating in 2006. Among his graduating classmates were Inga Salurand, Lauri Lagle, Mari-Liis Lill, Laura Peterson, Ursula Ratasepp, Britta Vahur, and Sergo Vares.

== Career ==
=== Theatre ===
While still a student, Kübar made his stage debut at Estonian Drama Theatre in Finis nihili, a play written by Madis Kõiv. This was followed by a role in William Shakespeare's A Midsummer Night's Dream. In 2006, just after graduation, he began working at Theatre NO99 in Tallinn, where he made his debut in Anton Chekhov's The Cherry Orchard.

Kübar performed at the Tallinn City Theatre in a production of George Orwell's Animal Farm, and the Vanemuine theatre in Tartu, where he played the role of guitarist Jaanus Nõgisto in the rock opera Ruja in 2008; a production based on the Estonian rock band of the same name.

He was engaged at Theatre NO99 until 2014, where he was also involved in the international co-production Three Kingdoms by Simon Stephens (directed by Sebastian Nübling). For his performance in Orpheus Descending by Tennessee Williams (directed by Nübling), Kübar was voted Young Actor of the Year 2013 by the professional journal Theater heute.

He joined the Munchner Kammerspiele, where he became a member of the ensemble from 2014 to 2015, under the direction of intendant Johan Simons.

From 2015 until 2018 Kübar was a member of the ensemble of the Belgian theatre NTGent, before its structure changed in 2018 under the new artistic director Milo Rau.

Kübar featured in Die Fremden, a production of NTGent and the German Ruhrtriennale festival, directed by Johan Simons. On 2 September 2016 Die Fremden premiered in the Kohlenmischhalle of the Zeche Auguste Victoria in Marl, Germany as part of the Ruhrtriennale 2016. The premiere in Ghent took place on 21 September 2016 in the Floralies Hall.

On 1–2 October 2016, Kübar returned to the Theatre NO99 in a production of the play Spectacular Lightshows of Which U Don't See The Effect. The two-man show, with Belgian actor Benny Claessens, caused some controversy for the amount of nudity and the homosexual theme, but garnered positive reviews.

In February 2018, Kübar performed with NTGent, director Florian Fischer and actress Lien Wildemeersch To name herstory, which was an adaptation of Don Quixote: which was a dream (1986) by Kathy Acker. The press called Kübar's idiosyncratic style perfect in its content, inventor of a new language that, despite its bizarre character, communicates immediately with the audience.

In 2018 he joined the Schauspielhaus Bochum ensemble, where he appeared in Die Jüdin von Toledo (dir.Johan Simons), and in the co-production with NTGent Orestes in Mosul (dir. Milo Rau).

=== Film ===
Kübar made his film debut as a voice actor in the 2006 animated short film Maraton for Eesti Joonisfilm. He followed this as a voice extra in the feature-length Heiki Ernits and Janno Põldma-directed Estonian animated children's film Leiutajateküla Lotte (English: Lotte from Gadgetville).

He became more widely known when he played a starring role in the 2011 Rainer Sarnet-directed Idioot; an adaptation of Fyodor Dostoyevsky's The Idiot.

== Recognition and awards ==
- Voldemar Panso award (2004)
- Kristallkingake award (Adolf Rühka, Adolf Rühka lühikene elu) (2006)
- Estonian Theatre Award for Best Supporting Actor (The Trickster, Three Kingdoms) (2011)
- Estonian Cultural Endowment of the Arts (2013)
- Theater heute Young Actor of the Year (2013)
- Arlecchino for Best Supporting Actor for Dit zijn de namen (2016), written by Tommy Wieringa and directed by Philipp Becker

== Personal life ==
On 6 October 2014, Kübar penned an open letter addressed to Estonian lawyer Varro Vooglaid, who is the foundation chairman of the Foundation for the Protection of the Family and Tradition (SAPTK) (Estonian: Perekonna ja Traditsiooni Kaitseks). The letter, printed in the daily Estonian newspaper Postimees, was a personal and public appeal that took aim at Vooglaid's anti-gay sentiments and opposition towards the gender-neutral civil partnership law passed by the Estonian Parliament; a cohabitation agreement that gives the same legal protections to same-sex couples that are available to opposite-sex couples. In the letter, Kübar publicly came out as gay, making him one of the first well-known Estonian celebrities to do so.
