= Merle Jääger =

Estonian actress and poet

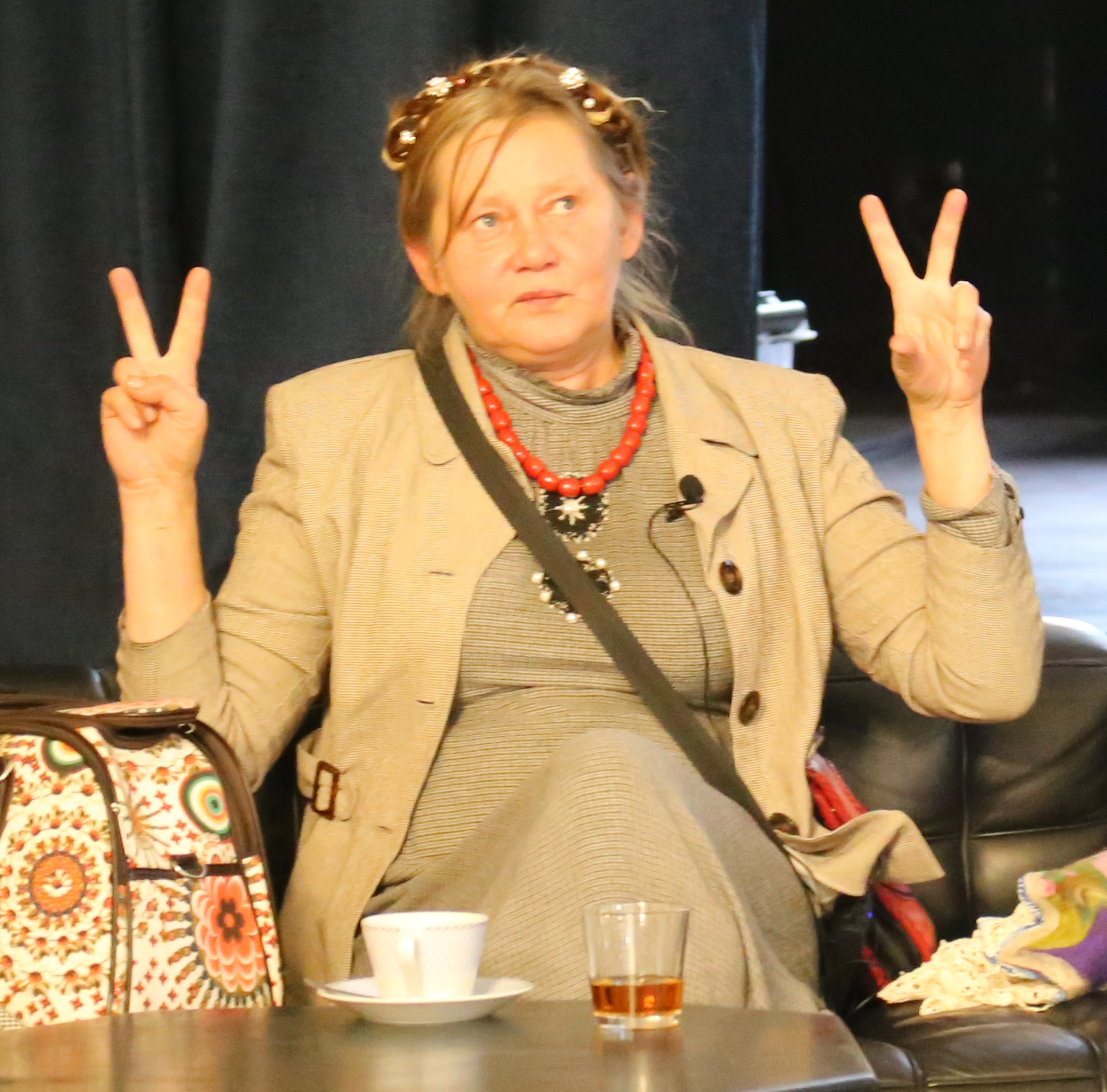
- Jääger in 2021
- Born: 19 October 1965 (age 61); Tallinn, then part of Estonian SSR, Soviet Union
- Other name: Merca
- Occupations: Actress, poet, author
- Years active: 1986–present
- Children: 1

Merle Jääger (born 19 October 1965) is an Estonian television, stage and film actress, poet and author who frequently uses the pen name Merca. Initially associated with the burgeoning Estonian punk rock scene of the early to mid 1980s, she has been described as the "bard of protest". Her career as an actress began in her early 20s and she has received a number of high-profile awards for stage roles.

== Early life and education ==
Merle Jääger was born and raised in Tallinn to parents Ülo and Ivi Jääger, where she attended primary school and Tallinn Extramural Secondary School, Tallinn 46th Secondary School, and Tallinn Secondary School of Science. Her father was railway worker and her mother was an accountant. After secondary school in 1983, Jääger studied acting and theatre at the Tallinn State Conservatory (now, the Estonian Academy of Music and Theatre) under instruction of theatre pedagogue Kalju Komissarov, graduating in 1988. Among her graduating classmates were actors Elmo Nüganen, Piret Kalda, Dajan Ahmet, Külli Palmsaar, Raivo E. Tamm, Rain Simmul and Anne Reemann.

== Career ==
=== Acting ===
Following her graduation from Tallinn State Conservatory, Jääger has been engaged as a stage actress at the Vanemuine theatre in Tartu since 1988, with several lapses. Jääger's production diploma roles were as Prince Hamlet in William Shakespeare's Hamlet in 1987, performed at St. Catherine's Monastery in Tallinn, and as Olga Sergeyevna Prozorova in Anton Chekhov's Three Sisters, performed at the Ugala theatre in Viljandi in 1988. Her first two roles as an actress engaged at the Vanemuine were as Florence in a production of Robert Thomas' 1964 play Trap for a Lonely Man, and as Lady Macduff in a production of William Shakespeare's MacBeth, both performed in 1988. During her career at the Vanemuine, Jääger has appeared in roles in productions of such varied international authors and playwrights as: Johann Wolfgang von Goethe, Oscar Wilde, René Highway, Witold Gombrowicz, Jean Anouilh, Biljana Srbljanović, Charlotte Jones, Tom Stoppard, Arthur Miller, Algot Untola, Edward Albee, C. S. Lewis, Jule Styne, Billy Roche, Ödön von Horváth, Brian Friel, the Sherman Brothers, Tim Firth, Anton Chekhov, Robert James Waller, Ingmar Bergman, Velma Wallis, J. B. Priestley, Kander and Ebb, and Ray Cooney. Among her more memorable performances at the Vanemuine in roles by Estonian playwrights and authors include those of: Kauksi Ülle, Eduard Vilde, Oskar Luts, Ilmar Külvet, Bernard Kangro, Kati Vatmann, Madis Kõiv, Andrus Kivirähk, Andra Teede, and Meelis Friedenthal.

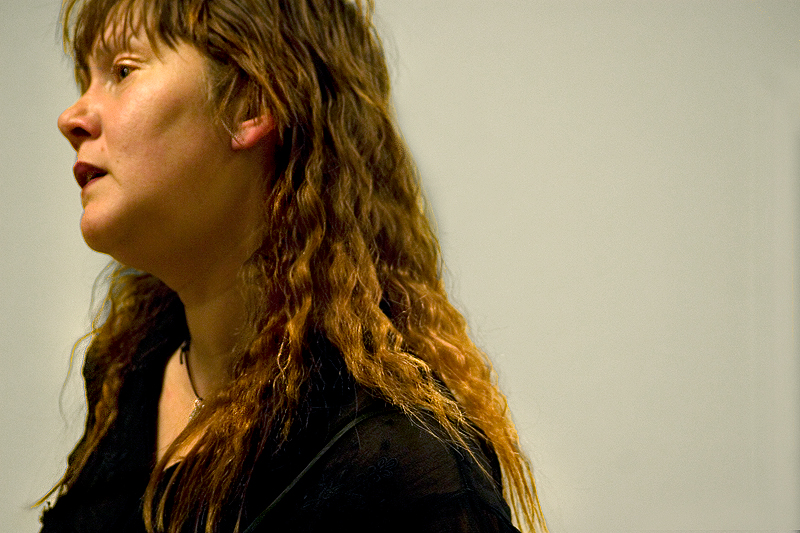
Jääger in 2008.

Since 2006, Jääger has also performed as a stage actress in humorous summer productions at the Hansahoovi Theatre in Tartu. She has also written two plays, Saun and Kolhoos, that were performed at the theatre in 2008 and 2009, respectively, with Jääger among the cast. She has also performed, written and directed with the Taarka Heritage Theatre collective, an amateur theatre group founded with the goal to promote and preserve Seto culture and identity.

Merle Jääger has also appeared in a number of television roles. Her first significant role was as Hilda in the 1992 two-part Eesti Televisioon (ETV) period drama film Soo, based on the 1914 novel of the same name (originally titled Kirjutatud on…) by Oskar Luts. In 2009, she appeared as Miia in six episodes of the Kanal 2 crime series Kelgukoerad. She has also appeared in several other Estonian televisions series, including: Kättemaksukontor in 2013, Padjaklubi in 2014, and Viimane võmm and Restart in 2015.

In 1988, Jääger made her film debut in a small role in the Elo Trust-directed and Mati Unt-penned short film Noid. Her first significant feature-length film role was that of Lembala, the wife of 13th-century Estonian chieftain Lembitu (played by Ain Mäeots), in the 2005 Kaaren Kaer-directed historical comedy Malev. This was followed by the role a history teacher in the Ilmar Raag-directed 2007 drama Klass. The film won several international awards and was the official Estonian submission to the Best Foreign Language Film Category of the 80th Academy Awards. Also, in 2007, she appeared as Mother in the Kadri Kõusaar-directed family drama film Magnus. In 2011, she appeared in the Mart Kivastik-directed drama Üks mu sõber, opposite actor Aarne Üksküla. Other feature-length film roles include Õnn tuleb magades in 2016, Rohelised kassid in 2017, and Klassikokkutulek 2: Pulmad ja matused, a 2018 sequel to the 2016 René Vilbre-directed comedy Klassikokkutulek. In 2019, she appeared as early 20th-century Seto folk singer Hilana Taarka in the Hardi Volmer-directed historical comedy Johannes Pääsukese tõeline elu.

Additionally, Jääger has also appeared in a number of student films and short films, including the role of Eve in the popular 2006 Rasmus Merivoo-directed comedy Tulnukas ehk Valdise pääsemine 11 osas, opposite actors Mart Avandi, Ott Sepp, Vallo Kirs, and Uku Uusberg.

In 2024, she reprised her role of Eve in Tulnukas 2 ehk Valdise tagasitulek 17 osas, directed by Rasmus Merivoo, which is a feature-length sequel to Tulnukas ehk Valdise pääsemine 11 osas.

She is a member of the Estonian Theatre Union since 1990 and a member of the Estonian Actors' Union since 1993.

=== Poetry ===
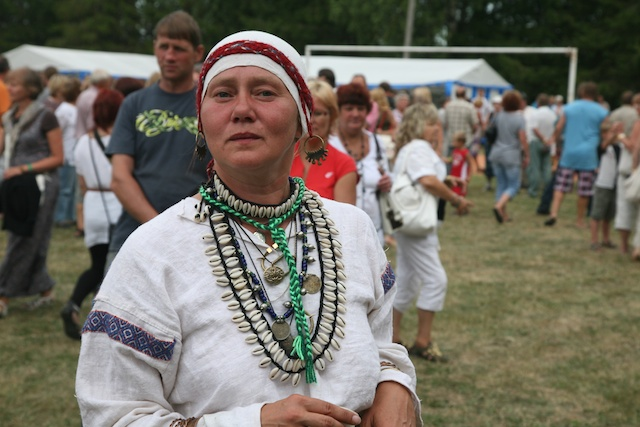
Merle Jääger at the Seto Kingdom Day in August 2011.

Since 1986, Merle Jääger has been a published poet, using the pen name Merca. Inspired by, and central to the burgeoning punk rock music scene happening in the country in the early to mid 1980s while the Estonian Soviet Socialist Republic was still subordinated directly to the Government of the Soviet Union. Open, direct, and often confrontational in her work (particularly, her early work), she became something of an enfant terrible and has been described as rebellious and the "bard of protest". In 1988, she collaborated with Tõnu Trubetsky, singer of the punk rock band Vennaskond, on two poems that were included in his book of poetry Pogo, published by Eesti Raamat.

In 1988, Jääger was the youngest of the twenty-four founding members of the Estonian cultural and literary group Wellesto. The group also included such notable intellectuals as Madis Kõiv, Maimu Berg, Mati Hint, Sven Grünberg, Doris Kareva, Rein Kruus, Toomas Liiv, Ivar Ivask, Toomas Raudam, Hasso Krull, Linnart Mäll, Jaan Undusk, Haljand Udam, Olev Remsu, Mati Sirkel, Ülev Aaloe, and future fourth President of Estonia Toomas Hendrik Ilves. In 2000, she became a member of the Estonian Writers' Union.

== Politics ==
Merle Jääger is a member of the Tartu City Council and serves on the council's Cultural Committee, having belonged to the Pro Patria and Res Publica Union Party and Estonian Free Party. Jääger also unsuccessfully ran for the Estonian European Parliament elections of 2014 on the Estonian Independence Party ticket, receiving 178 votes.

== Personal life ==
Merle Jääger has one daughter from a marriage that ended in divorce. She had a thirteen year relationship with stage manager Imre Toomeoks which ended in 2023 after Jääger alleged abuse by Toomeoks.

Jääger resides on a farm in Obinitsa in Võru County.

She has served in the Estonian Defence Forces, and is a member of the Academic Unit of the Defence League unit in Tartu.

== Works ==
Collections of poetry

- Merca by air mail: Ameerika valimik (1989)
- MercAmerka: teine Ameerika-valimik (1989)
- Vana libu hommik (1998)
- Hele häärber (2005)
- Narrivile (2007)
- Pühä päiv (2013)
- Iseqnn (2020)

Novels

- Mees (2009)

Prose

- Jututulbad / Storypillars (2015)
- Ollipanõhõpõpääle (2021, Seto language)

Children's literature

- Mullivesi (2009)

== Acknowledgements ==
- Voldemar Panso Prize (1988)
- Drama '96 Award (1996)
- Ants Lauter Award (1997)
- Estonian Theatre Union Award (Best Actress) (1998)
- Drama '99 Award (Best Actress) (1999)
- Karl Eduard Sööt Prize for Children's Poetry (2009)
- Estonian Theater Union Award (Best Supporting Actress) (2014)
