= Ursula Ratasepp =

Estonian actress (born 1982)

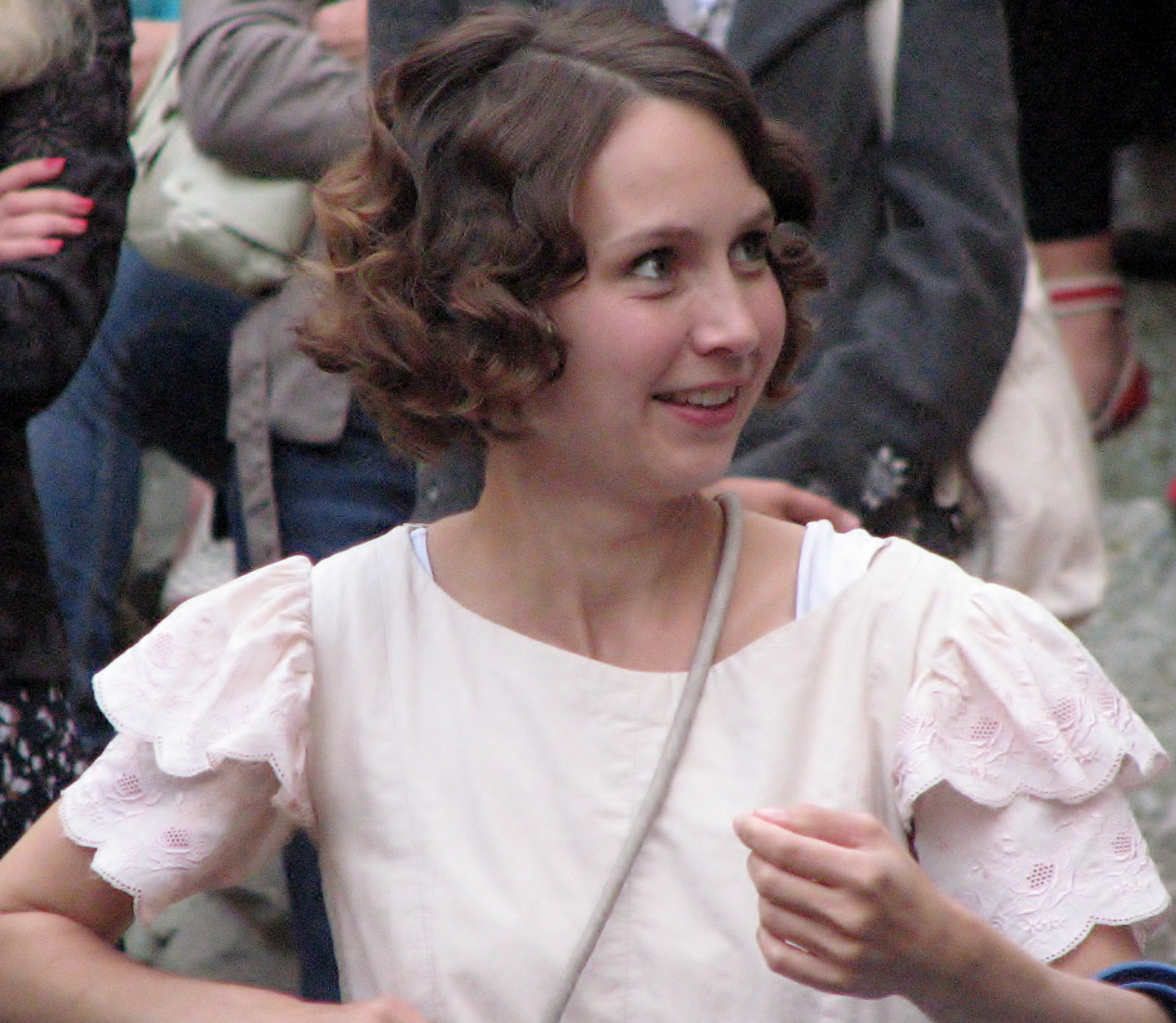
- Ratasepp in 2012
- Born: 17 June 1982 (age 43); Tallinn, Estonia
- Other names: Ursula Oja; Ursula Ratasepp-Oja
- Occupation: Actress
- Years active: 2004–present
- Spouse: Kaarel Oja (m. 2010)
- Children: 3

Ursula Ratasepp (born 17 June 1982) is an Estonian stage, film and television actress.

== Early life and education ==
Ursula Ratasepp was born in Tallinn in 1982. She is the older sister of actress Katariina Ratasepp (born 1986). She studied drama at the Vanalinnastuudio until 2001, then studied psychology at the University of Tartu until 2002. She then enrolled at the EMA Higher Drama School (now, the Estonian Academy of Music and Theatre) in Tallinn, graduating in 2006. Among her graduating classmates were Inga Salurand, Risto Kübar, Mari-Liis Lill, Laura Peterson, Lauri Lagle, Britta Vahur, and Sergo Vares. In 2014, she received her bachelor's degree in psychology from the University of Tartu.

== Career ==
=== Stage ===
Following her graduation from the EMA Higher Drama School in 2006, Ratasepp became engaged as a stage actress at the Tallinn City Theatre, where she is still currently employed. She made her stage debut at the theatre in a small role in the Jaan Tätte-penned Kaev the year she joined the theatre. Some of her more memorable roles at the Tallinn City Theatre include those in works by such authors and playwrights as Luigi Pirandello, William Butler Yeats, Nicholas Wright, A. H. Tammsaare, Carlo Gozzi, and J. B. Priestley.

Ratasepp has also performed at various other theatres throughout Estonia, including the Estonian Drama Theatre in Tallinn, the Theatre NO99 in Tallinn, the Endla Theatre in Pärnu, and the Tartu Summer Theatre.

=== Film and television ===
Ratasepp made her television debut as Kaisa on the TV3 television drama series Kodu keset linna in 2005, a character she would play until leaving the series in 2006. From 2006 until 2007, she appeared in several episodes of the Eesti Televisioon (ETV) crime drama series Ohtlik lend in the role of Kaja. In 2010, she played the role of the Prime Minister's secretary in the ETV political satire series Riigimehed. She has also appeared on several episodes of the popular TV3 comedy-crime series Kättemaksukontor. In 2016, she joined the cast of the popular Kanal 2 crime series Siberi võmm as the character Eeva Lindeman. In 2017, she a played a central role of Brita in the Kanal 2 drama-mystery series Nukumaja, and in 2020, she appeared as the character Rita Laikmaa on the ETV drama series Reetur.

In 2024, she began appearing in the role of Kadri in the Ergo Kuld directed TV3 drama Valetamisklubi.

Ratasepp made her film debut as a voice extra in the feature-length Heiki Ernits- and Janno Põldma-directed 2006 animated children's film Leiutajateküla Lotte (English: Lotte from Gadgetville). In 2013, she had a starring role as the title character Kertu in the Ilmar Raag-directed romantic-drama Kertu, opposite actor Mait Malmsten. The film was retitled Love Is Blind in English-language markets. In 2011, she appeared as a nurse in the Mart Kivastik-directed drama Üks mu sõber. In 2015, she had another starring role as Kadri in the Klaus Härö-directed period drama Vehkleja (English: The Fencer), which was adapted from the life story of Endel Nelis, and co-stars Märt Avandi as a fencer and instructor wanted by the Soviet secret police who eventually has to make a life-altering decision. Vehkleja won several awards, including Best Film at Finland's 2016 Jussi Awards, and was nominated for Best Motion Picture at the 73rd Golden Globe Awards in 2016.

== Personal life ==
Ursula Ratasepp (Ratasepp-Oja) married then an Estonian Theatre Festival CEO, theatre manager and director, now a deputy mayor of Tallinn, Kaarel Oja in 2010. The couple have three children: a daughter Elo-Mirt (2009), a son Jaakob Eik (2011) and another son Laurits (2016). They currently reside in Tallinn. Her sister is actress Katariina Ratasepp, her father-in-law is actor Tõnu Oja, as is her brother-in-law Pääru Oja.
