= Britta Soll =

Estonian actress and model

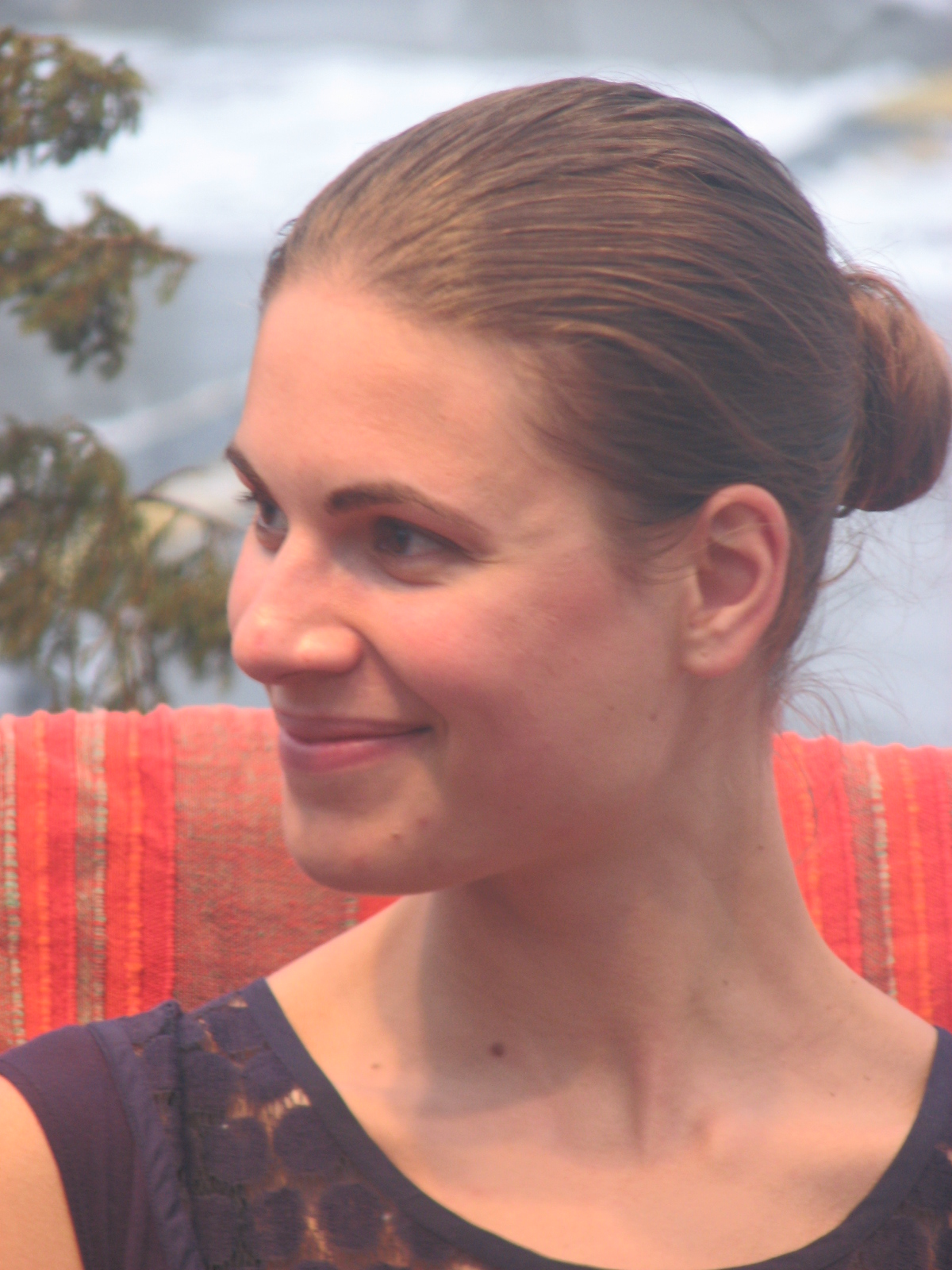
- Born: Britta Vahur; 14 July 1984 (age 41); Tallinn, then part of Estonian SSR, Soviet Union
- Occupations: Actress, model
- Years active: 2002 – present
- Spouse: Allan Soll (2013 – present)
- Children: 2

Britta Soll (until 2013, Britta Vahur; born 14 July 1984) is an Estonian stage, film, and television actress and former fashion model.

== Early life and education ==
Britta Vahur was born in Tallinn, where she attended schools. Her mother works in a bank and her father is a trolley driver. She has an older half-brother, Marius. She graduated from secondary school at the Jakob Westholm Gymnasium in 2002. Afterward, she enrolled in the EMA Higher Drama School (now, the Estonian Academy of Music and Theatre) in Tallinn, graduating in 2006. Among her graduating classmates were Inga Salurand, Risto Kübar, Mari-Liis Lill, Laura Peterson, Ursula Ratasepp, Lauri Lagle, and Sergo Vares.

== Career ==
=== Stage ===
In 2006, Vahur began an engagement at the Estonian Drama Theatre in Tallinn, where she still currently performs. During her career at the Linnateater, she has appeared in roles in productions of such varied authors and playwrights as: Shakespeare, Fyodor Dostoevsky, Selma Lagerlöf, Brian Friel, Ivan Turgenev, Ingmar Bergman, Bogusław Schaeffer, Juan Rulfo, Anton Chekhov, Peter Quilter, Tom Stoppard, Jean Anouilh, Tena Štivičić, Lee Hall, and Jean-Claude Grumberg, among several others. Additionally, she appeared in several productions of works by such Estonian authors and playwrights as: Mihkel Ulman, Madis Kõiv, Priit Pedajas, Uku Uusberg, and, Paul-Eerik Rummo.

Vahur has also worked as a fashion model and as a stage actress at several theatres, including: the R.A.A.A.M. theatre, Theatre NO99, the Tallinn City Theatre, and the Endla Theatre, among others.

=== Film and television ===
In 2006, Soll (then still using her maiden name Britta Vahur) made her first appearance on Estonian television with a role on an episode of the Eesti Televisioon (ETV) crime-drama series Ohtlik lend. This was followed by the role of Anu on the Kanal 2 crime series Kelgukoerad between 2007 and 2008; and as Marja-Liisa from 2011 until 2012 on the ETV historical comedy series ENSV: Eesti Nõukogude Sotsialistlik Vabariik, which reflects on life during the 1980s in the Estonian Soviet Socialist Republic. She has also made appearances in smaller roles on such television series as: the TV3 serial Helena in 2006, the TV3 comedy series Kalevi naised in 2008, the TV3 crime-comedy Kättemaksukontor in 2009, the TV3 drama Kartulid ja apelsinid in 2014, and the TV3 drama Üheotsapilet in 2015.

Soll made her film debut as Elisabeth in the Moonika Siimets directed film short Deus ex Machina in 2005. In 2007, she appeared as Karin in her first feature-length film, Nuga; a drama directed by Marko Raat which starred Mait Malmsten and Kersti Heinloo. The same year, she had a small role in the Peeter Simm directed biographic drama Georg, which chronicled the life of Estonian singer and actor Georg Ots. In 2016, she appeared in another small role as a sperm clinic doctor in the René Vilbre directed comedy film Klassikokkutulek. In 2021, she appeared as Katya in the Peeter Rebane directed historical drama Firebird.

== Personal life ==
Britta Vahur married businessman Allan Soll in August 2013. The couple have been in a long-term relationship since 2009. They have two daughters, born in 2013 and 2014. The family currently reside in Tallinn.
