= Lauri Lagle =

Estonian actor and film director

- Born: 12 February 1981 (age 45); Tallinn, then part of Estonian SSR, Soviet Union
- Occupations: Actor, film director, playwright
- Years active: 2004–present
- Children: 1

Lauri Lagle (born 12 February 1981) is an Estonian stage and film actor, screenwriter, stage producer, director and playwright.

== Early life ==
Lauri Lagle was born in Tallinn, where he attended school. He graduated from the Estonian Academy of Music and Theatre in 2006. Among his graduating classmates were Inga Salurand, Risto Kübar, Mari-Liis Lill, Laura Peterson, Ursula Ratasepp, Britta Vahur, and Sergo Vares.

== Stage career ==
While still a student, he made his stage debut at the Estonian Drama Theatre (Eesti Draamateater) as Mauno Susi in a 2004 production of Madis Kõiv's Finis nihili. This was followed by the role of Puck in Shakespeare's A Midsummer Night's Dream, the same year. In 2005, he appeared as Arno in a production of Oskar Luts' Kevade. In 2006, he would officially become engaged at the Estonian Drama Theatre, beginning with the role of David in a production of Brian Friel's The Home Place. Lagle would remain at the Estonian Drama Theatre until 2013 and appear in stage productions of works by Fyodor Dostoyevsky, Arthur Miller, Hendrik Toompere Jr., and Antti Tuuri, among others.

Following his engagement at the Estonian Drama Theatre, Lagle became a freelance actor, appearing frequently in roles at the Theatre NO99 in Tallinn, as well as performing at the Tallinn City Theatre and the Endla Theatre.

As well as performing as a stage actor, Lauri Lagle has also produced and directed a number of plays. These include several for the Estonian Drama Theatre and Theatre NO99 and most notably, 2016's Paradiis, which was also written by Lagle and debuted at Tallinn's Von Krahl Theatre.

== Film and television ==
Lauri Lagle made his film debut in the 2005 Kristjan Sarv-directed road movie short 2pic. This was followed by the role of La Mort in the 2007 Rainer Sarnet-directed drama Kuhu põgenevad hinged. In 2013, he had a starring role as Fred in the Veiko Õunpuu directed drama Free Range/Ballaad maailma heakskiitmisest. The film was selected as the Estonian entry for the Best Foreign Language Film at the 86th Academy Awards, but it was not nominated. Lagle's performance, however, garnered him a Best Actor award at the 22nd Vilnius International Film Festival in 2014. The following year, he appeared as Lowry in the Veiko Õunpuu-directed drama Roukli, starring Taavi Eelmaa. In 2019, he appeared in the role of Commander Rebane in the Miguel Llansó-directed English language absurdist action comedy/sci-fi film Jesus Shows You the Way to the Highway.

In 2009, he appeared as Käbi in the ETV twelve-part television mini-series Tuulepealne maa, which follows the pre-World War II history of Estonia; its birth as a country, the Estonian War of Independence, post-war life throughout 1920 up to 1941 and World War II. He has also made appearances as Sten in the popular TV3 crime-comedy series Kättemaksukontor in 2009.

In 2016, the Estonian Film Institute and the Cultural Endowment of Estonia granted Lagle €120,000 to direct his first feature film, Portugal; based on a screenplay written by Lagle and starring Mirtel Pohla and Jarmo Reha.

== Personal life ==
Lagle is in a romantic relationship with artist and graphic designer Eliise Raadik. The couple have a daughter, born on 12 October 2018.

== Acknowledgments ==
- Käsu Ants, Estonian Drama Theatre stage director Colleague Award (2009)
- Estonian Theatre Critics and Researchers' award for Good Theatre (2012)
- Best Actor award, 22nd Vilnius International Film Festival (2014)
- Ants Lauter Award (2017)
