= Helene Vannari =

Estonian actress (1948–2022)

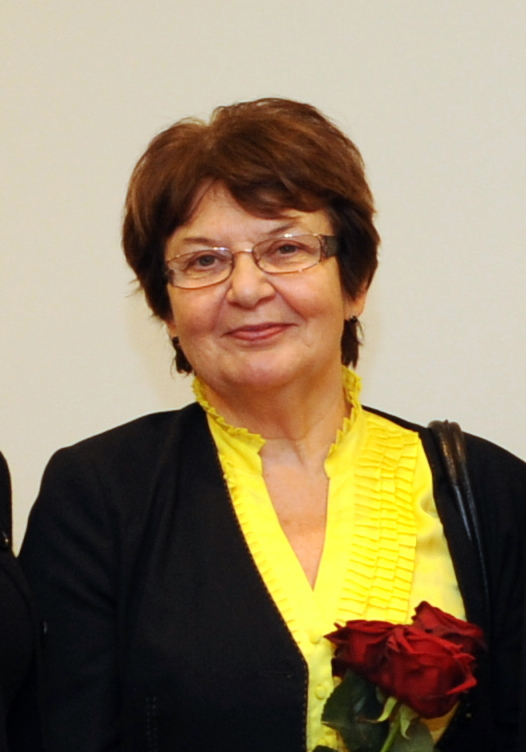
- Vannari in 2013
- Born: 20 March 1948; Kilingi-Nõmme, then part of Estonian SSR, Soviet Union
- Died: 16 March 2022 (aged 73); Tallinn, Estonia
- Other names: Helene Pillak; Helene Vannari-Pillak; Leeni Vannari
- Occupation: Actress
- Years active: 1970–2021
- Spouse: Peep Pillak (m. 1969; div. 1999)
- Children: Annaliisa Pillak
- Awards: Order of the White Star IV Class

Helene Vannari (20 March 1948 – 16 March 2022) was an Estonian stage, radio, television and film actress.

== Early life and education ==
Vannari was born in the town of Kilingi-Nõmme in Pärnu County. Her father was a forestry teacher and her mother was an archivist. She is one of two siblings, both girls. When Vannari was three-years-old, her family moved to Tartu, where she attended schools, including studying at the Vanemuine drama studio, graduating in 1966. At age seven, her father died and she was raised by her mother. In 1970, she graduated from the Tallinn State Conservatory, Performing Arts Department (now, the Estonian Academy of Music and Theatre). During her studies at the Tallinn State Conservatory, she met and befriended classmate Ene Järvis. The two would become lifelong friends.

== Stage career ==
After graduation, Vannari, referred to as "Leeni" by colleagues and friends, joined the Ugala theatre in Viljandi in 1970. She would remain an actress at the theatre until 1974. Some of her most memorable stage roles at the Ugala were as Petrella Lucia in Eduardo De Filippo's The Art of Comedy (1970), Miina in August Kitzberg's Püve Peter's Tricks (1971), Valentina in Mikhail Roshchin's Valentin and Valentina (1971), and as Tom Canty in Mark Twain's The Prince and the Pauper (1972).

In 1976, she joined the Tallinn City Theatre where she was still engaged until her death. During her many years at the theatre, she has performed in memorable roles in works by international authors and playwrights such as: Shakespeare, Molière, Guilherme Figueiredo, Eugene O'Neill, Federico García Lorca, Jean Genet, Sławomir Mrożek, Rainer Werner Fassbinder, Dario Fo, Eduard Uspensky, Arthur Conan Doyle, Martin McDonagh, Alexandre Dumas, Thomas Mann, Martin McDonagh and Evelyn Waugh, among others. Memorable roles in works by Estonian authors and playwrights include those of: Rein Saluri, Paul Kuusberg, Hugo Raudsepp, A. H. Tammsaare, and Jaan Tätte, among others.

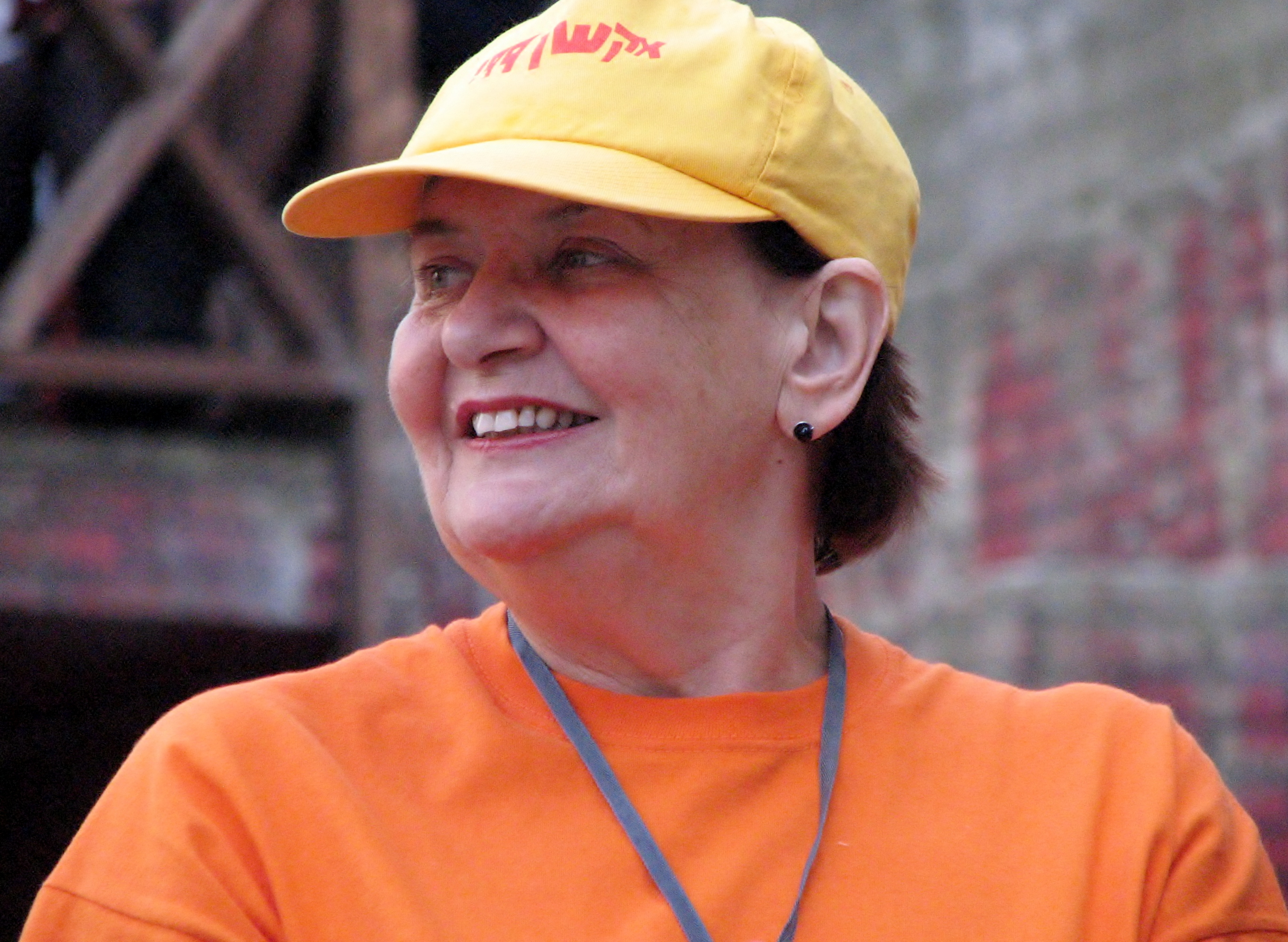
Vannari at the Tallinn City Theatre in 2012

Throughout her career onstage, she has appeared in many other theatres in Estonia, including: the Estonian Drama Theatre, the Vanalinnastuudio (Old Town Studio theatre), the Rändteater (Travelling Theatre), the Pärimusteater (Heritage Theatre), and the Vana Baskini Teater (Old [Eino] Baskin's Theatre).

== Television career ==
Vannari's first substantial television role was as Tiiger Urr in the 1981 television family film Onu Tik-Taki seiklused, directed by Virve Koppel. This was followed by the role of Ivo's mother in the 1994 Finnish-Estonian comedy television film Amerikan unelma, directed by Kalle Pursiainen for Yleisradio (YLE). In 1995, she appeared as Maria in the ETV historical drama miniseries Wikmani poised, based on the 1988 novel of the same name by Estonian author Jaan Kross.

In 2006, she appeared on the ETV crime-drama series Ohtlik lend, and in 2011 appeared as Aino Lillepuu in an episode of the Finnish MTV3 crime-drama thriller Tappajan näköinen mies. From 2010, she had a recurring role as Aino Kessner in the historical comedy series ENSV: Eesti Nõukogude Sotsialistlik Vabariik, which reflects on life during the early 1980s in the Estonian Soviet Socialist Republic.

Other appearances in television series include; Tupiktänava mehed (2012–2013), Saare Sosinad (2012–2013); Kelgukoerad (several roles between 2007 and 2012); Mägede Varjud (2013–2014); Üheotsapilet (2015); and as Asta Vilumäe in two episodes of the popular TV3 comedy-crime series Kättemaksukontor (2015).

== Film ==
Vannari made her feature film debut in 1990 in a small role in the Arvo Kruusement directed Sügis for Tallinnfilm. The film was based on the 1938 Oskar Luts novel of the same name and the final part of a trilogy of both the novels and films made based on them. This was followed by another small role in the Aimée Beekman and Vladimir Beekman penned, Kaljo Kiisk directed drama Regina, also released in 1990 by Tallinnfilm. In 1991, she played the role of Selma in the Roman Baskin directed drama Rahu tänav, and in 1992 she played the role of Juula in the Lembit Ulfsak directed comedy family film Lammas all paremas nurgas.

In 1997, Vannari played Russian Bolshevik revolutionary, politician, and the wife of Vladimir Lenin, Nadezhda Krupskaya in the Hardi Volmer directed Estonian historic comedy Minu Leninid, starring Üllar Saaremäe.

In 2002, she appeared in a small role in the Elmo Nüganen historical drama Nimed marmortahvlil, based on the 1936 novel of the same name by author Albert Kivikas, that follows young Estonian men fighting in the 1918-1920 Estonian War of Independence. In 2006, she appeared as Leida in the television comedy film Meeletu, directed by Elmo Nüganen and produced by Taska Film and Tallinnfilm. In 2007, Vannari appeared in the Peeter Simm directed film Georg; a biographical drama chronicling the life of Estonian singer Georg Ots. In 2006, Vannari had appeared in a television film musical with the same title, also focusing on the life of Ots.

In 2012, she played the role of Mai in the Ilmar Raag directed drama Une Estonienne à Paris. The film follows an Estonian woman named Anne (played by Laine Mägi) who leaves Estonia to travel to Paris and care for an elderly Estonian woman named Frida (played by French actress Jeanne Moreau) who emigrated to France long ago. The following year she appeared as Helga in the romantic drama Kertu, again directed by Ilma Raag, and starring Ursula Ratasepp and Mait Malmsten.

In 2020, she voiced the character of Grandmother in the Meelis Arulepp and Karsten Kiilerich directed animated feature film Sipsik, based on the popular 1962 children's book of the same title by Eno Raud.

== Personal life ==
Vannari married actor Peep Pillak in 1969, at age 21. They have one daughter, singer Annaliisa Pillak. The couple divorced in 1999. She died in Tallinn on 16 March 2022, at the age of 73.
