= Hilje Murel =

Estonian actress

- Born: 17 December 1975 (age 50); Võru, then part of Estonian SSR, Soviet Union
- Occupation: Actress
- Years active: 1998 – present
- Children: 2

Hilje Murel (born 17 December 1975) is an Estonian stage, film, and television actress.

== Early life and education ==
Hilje Murel was born in the town of Võru in Võru County. She is a 1998 graduate of the EMA Higher Drama School (now, the Estonian Academy of Music and Theatre) in Tallinn. Among her graduating classmates were Tiit Sukk, Veikko Täär, Harriet Toompere, Andero Ermel, Liina Vahtrik and Jan Uuspõld.

== Career ==
=== Stage ===
In 1998, shortly after graduation from the EMA Higher Drama School, Murel began an engagement as an actress at the Ugala theatre in Viljandi where she made her stage debut in the role of Ida in Astrid Saalbach's 1986 play The Dance Lesson. She spent ten years as an actress with the Ugala, leaving in 2008. Memorable performances there include roles in works by Shakespeare, Molière, Leo Tolstoy, David Harrower, Thorbjørn Egner, Friedrich Schiller, Mark Twain, Fyodor Dostoyevsky, Conor McPherson, Ben Travers, Mark Ravenhill, Isaac Bashevis Singer, Eve Ensler, Giovanni Boccaccio, Erich Maria Remarque, Nikolai Gogol, Jean Anouilh, Anton Chekhov, Otfried Preußler, Alistair Beaton and Donald Margulies. Roles in works by Estonian authors and playwrights include works by Oskar Luts, Eduard Vilde, A. H. Tammsaare, Kauksi Ülle, Olev Remsu, Hella Wuolijoki, Urmas Lennuk, August Gailit, August Kitzberg, and Loone Ots.

In 2008, Murel joined the Estonian Drama Theatre in Tallinn, where she is still engaged. In the same year, she appeared as Miss Framer in a production of Peter Shaffer's 1987 satirical play Lettice and Lovage. She has had other roles in productions of works by authors and playwrights including Tennessee Williams, Juan Rulfo, Arthur Miller, Halldór Laxness, Tom Stoppard, Andrus Kivirähk, Tracy Letts, Jane Bowles and David Hare. More recent roles have included Dorine in Molière's Tartuffe, Jenny in Simon Gray's Final and Françoise Hirt in Yasmina Reza's Bella Figura.

=== Film ===
Hilje Murel made her film debut in a starring role as Li in the Rainer Sarnet-directed 1998 dramatic short film Libarebased ja kooljad in 1998, which was adapted from the collection of short stories by the Qing dynasty Chinese writer Pu Songling and produced by Eesti Televisioon (ETV) and Eesti Telefilm.

In 2003, she appeared in the role of Linda's daughter in the Rando Pettai-directed, Peep Pedmanson-written comedy Vanad ja kobedad saavad jalad alla (English release title: Made in Estonia). The film was based on the popular Estonian television comedy series Vanad ja kobedad. In 2004, she had a starring role in the Andres Maimik-directed dramatic short film Kurat tuleb sauna, based on the leitmotif Saunakuuldemängu by the Estonian writer Mati Unt. This was followed by a small role as Nasta in the 2008 Ain Mäeots-directed Exitfilm biographical feature film Taarka, based on the play of the same name by Kauksi Ülle about the difficult life of the Seto folk singer Hilana Taarka. Taarka has the distinction of being the first feature-length film made in the Seto dialect and won the 2008 Estonian Cultural Endowment Debut Award.

In 2013, she played the role of Silvi Säinas in the Toomas Hussar-directed comedy-adventure film Seenelkäik. The film was selected as the Estonian entry for the Best Foreign Language Oscar at the 85th Academy Awards, but it did not reach the final shortlist. In 2013, she played the role of Berit Piir in the family-fantasy drama Väikelinna detektiivid ja valge daami saladus, directed by René Vilbre and written by Mikhel Ulman. In 2016, she had a small role in the Valentin Kuik and Manfred Vainokivi-directed melodrama Perekonnavaled. In 2018, she appeared in a supporting role in the Liina Triškina-Vanhatalo-directed drama Võta või jäta and, in 2020, appeared in the Peeter Simm directed coming-of-age period drama Vee peal (On the Water).

In 2020, she voiced the character of Mother Rat in the Meelis Arulepp and Karsten Kiilerich-directed animated film Sipsik, based on the popular 1962 children's book of the same title by Eno Raud.

=== Television ===
Murel's first substantial television role was as Ludmila in the four episodes of the Swedish television drama miniseries Soldater i månsken in 2000. In 2005, she appeared as Anu in the Ilmar Raag-directed feature-length television drama film August 1991, a dramatisation of the failed Soviet attempt to suppress the independence movement in Estonia during the 1991 Soviet coup d'état attempt. The following year, she had a recurring role as Lea in the popular Kanal 2 crime-drama series Kelgukoerad. In 2007, she appeared as Külli in the Andri Luup-directed joint Estonian-Finnish television comedy film Kinnunen, about a Finnish misfit (played by Sesa Lehto) searching for a wife in Estonia.

In 2013, Murel appeared in several episodes of the comedy ETV political satire series Riigimehed. Throughout the 2000s, she has also made appearances in other television series, including the ETV crime drama series Ohtlik lend, the TV3 comedy-crimes series Kättemaksukontor and the Kanal 2 crime series Viimane võmm. In 2014, she joined the cast of the Kanal 2 comedy series Parim enne(Best before) as the character Kelluke.

She appeared in the Võro language dubbing of Peppa Pig, as well as several Estonian live action dramas and films.

== Personal life ==
Murel resides in Tallinn with her two children, a daughter and a son.
