= Kelgukoerad =

Estonian television series

Kelgukoerad is an Estonian criminal television series, which aired on the Kanal 2 television channel.

The series is directed by Raivo Maripuu.

The series was on the air from 2006-2013.

== Cast ==
- Kalju Komissarov as Mati Kelk (2006–2013)
- Madis Milling as Mart Kukk (2006–2013)
- Olaf Suuder as Robert "Rops" Rebane (2007–2012)
- Ita Ever as Elviira Memm (2006–2011)
- Kristofer Pai as Andri (2006–2012)
- Romiina Luik as Twin Romiina (2007–2012)
- Katarina Luik as Twin Katarina (2007–2012)
- Kaie Mihkelson as Liisbet Kann (2008–2011)
- Ivo Uukkivi as Post (2006–2009)
- Mait Malmsten as Kõsta (2006–2009)
- Priit Võigemast as Leo Pulk/Leonid Palka (2009–2012)
- Ülle Kaljuste as Signe (2006–2009)
- Taavi Eelmaa as Priit Post (2006–2012)
- Juhan Ulfsak as Kalle Kõsta (2010–2012)
- Kadri Rämmeld as Laura/Brita (2006–2008)
- Ada Lundver as Malle Kukk (2007–2010)
- Natali Lohk as Bärbel Orav (2011–2012)
- Kairit Tuhkanen as Anna Post (2007–2010)
- Liina Orlova as Aunt Agatha (2009–2010)
- Karin Rask as Triin Mets (2007–2008)
- Ithaka Maria as Milli (2008–2010)
- Anti Kobin as Minister Kõrs (2008–2013)
- Taavi Tõnisson as Peeter Pullerits (2008–2013)
- Paul Laasik as Volli (2006–2007)
- Hilje Murel as Lea Kõsta (2006)
- Liivika Hanstin as Kersti (2008–2012)
- Arolin Raudva as Hele (2011)
- Janek Sarapson as Alo Ojakäär/Arvi Tibar (2012)
- Meelis Pai as Toomas (2007–2008)
- Markko Aduson as Felix (2010)
- Liis-Katrin Avandi as Kirsika (2012–2013)
- Vilma Luik as Heli Õnneoja (2009–2012)
- Lenna Kuurmaa as Lili (2010)
- Merle Palmiste as Kertu Post (2006–2007)
- Arvo Kukumägi as Tõnn/Jaak (2006–2011)
- Märt Visnapuu as Ülo (2007–2011)
- Britta Soll as Anu Murakas (2007–2008)
- Merilin Kirbits as Kairi Lepik (2013)
- Kalju Orro as Hendrik Soopalu (2012)
- Maria Avdjuško as Heleene Bauman (2012)
- Kenneth Tutt as Gregor (2011)
- Mairi Jõgi as Aile Tammer (2012)
- Kersti Kreismann as Ella (2008)
- Helena Merzin as Mari (2007)
- Kärt Kross as Airi/Kertu (2006–2012)
- Tõnu Oja as Joosep Talivere (2010–2012)
- Andres Ild as Grandfather Artur (2007)
- Meeli Sööt as Roosi/Lilli (2008–2011)
- Mari-Liis Lill as Stella Veerik (2008)
- Ivo Eensalu as Manfred Aavakivi/Alo Smitt (2007–2011)
- Merle Jääger as Miia (2009)
- Grete Klein as Secretary Mia (2010–2011)
- Helene Vannari as Miralda/Matilda Põder/Tea (2007–2013)
- Mirtel Pohla as Paula (2006)
