= Malev (film) =

2005 film directed by Kaaren Kaer

- Directed by: Kaaren Kaer
- Written by: Kaaren Kaer, Tõnis Leht, Lauri Lippmaa, Erik Moora
- Produced by: Anneli Ahven
- Starring: Ott Sepp, Mirtel Pohla
- Cinematography: Andrus Prikk
- Edited by: Jüri Shestakov, Tambet Tasuja
- Music by: Ülo Krigul
- Distributed by: ETV (Eesti Televisioon), Exitfilm, Õ-Fraktsioon
- Release date: 9 September 2005
- Running time: 109 minutes
- Country: Estonia
- Language: Estonian

Malev (English release title: Men at Arms) is a 2005 Estonian comedy film directed by Kaaren Kaer. The film depicts Estonian adventures during 13th-century when heathen Estonians are going to be christianized.

== Cast ==
- Ott Sepp as Uru Tark
- Mirtel Pohla as Ilge
- Uku Uusberg as Tugis
- Argo Aadli as Leholas
- Üllar Saaremäe as Mentor Wolfram
- Mait Malmsten as Brother Wismuth
- Ain Mäeots as Lembitu
- Merle Jääger as Lembela
- Märt Avandi as Jūrmala bailiff Hippolyt
- Raivo E. Tamm as Bishop Albert
- Anti Kobin as Manivalde
- Sergo Vares as Henry of Livonia
- Kusti Laid as Young Uru
- Tarmo Tagamets as Brother Joschka / Vesse
- Dajan Ahmet as Chingis-Khan
- Mihkel Kabel as Pent, Elder of Nurmekundla
- Ago Anderson as Elder of Alempoistla
- Tarmo Männard as Elder of Ridala
- Feliks Kark as Elder of Mõhu
- Janek Joost as Elder of Ugandi
- Elmar Trink as Elder of Jogentagana
- Markus Luik as Nuntsius
- Ago Roo as Pope Innocentius III
- Aivar Rand as Telemachos
- Margo Sooäär as Master of German Order
- Jim Ashilevi as Kaupo (uncredited)
- Kaspar Jancis as Drunken German Soldier (uncredited)
- Rasmus Kaljujärv as Drunken German Soldier (uncredited)
- Jaak Kilmi as Drunken German Soldier (uncredited)
- Anton Klink as Soldier (uncredited)
- Kertu Köösel as Battle Virgin Krõõt (uncredited)
- Siim Maaten as Son of Vesse (uncredited)
- Aivo Sadam as French Eggscraper (uncredited)
- Tiit Sukk as Koopa Tark (uncredited)
