= A Friend of Mine (2011 film) =

2011 film

- Directed by: Mart Kivastik
- Produced by: Anneli Ahven
- Starring: Raivo Adlas
- Cinematography: Jarkko T. Laine
- Release date: 7 January 2011
- Running time: 102 minutes
- Country: Estonia
- Language: Estonian

A Friend of Mine (Estonian: Üks mu sõber) is a 2011 Estonian drama film directed by Mart Kivastik.

== Cast ==
- Raivo Adlas as Head Doctor
- Aleksander Eelmaa as Sass
- Tõnu Oja as Doctor
- Rita Raave as Ruth
- Sulev Teppart as Psychiatrist
- Aarne Üksküla as Mati
- Merle Jääger as Mati's wife
- Harriet Toompere as Mari, Mati's daughter
- Ingmar-Erik Kiviloo as Karl, Mari's son
- Markus Luik as Tõnn
- Raivo Adlas as Doctor
- Ursula Ratasepp as Nurse
