= Lindmaa =

Family name

Lindmaa is an Estonian language surname meaning "bird land" and may refer to:

- Liis Lindmaa (born 1988), actress
- Marek Lindmaa (born 1984), sportscaster and television journalist (:et)
- Meelis Lindmaa (born 1970), footballer
