= Mindless (film) =

2006 film directed by Elmo Nüganen

- Directed by: Elmo Nüganen
- Screenplay by: Elmo Nüganen
- Based on: Meeletu by Jaan Tätte
- Produced by: Kristian Taska
- Cinematography: Mait Mäekivi
- Edited by: Tambet Tasuja
- Music by: Jaak Jürisson
- Production companies: Taska Film; Eesti Televisioon
- Release date: 5 October 2006
- Running time: 90 minutes
- Country: Estonia
- Language: Estonian

Mindless (Estonian: Meeletu) is a 2006 Estonian comedy film directed by Elmo Nüganen and starring Rain Simmul. It tells the story of a 40-year-old businessman who moves to the countryside. It is based on the play with the same name by Jaan Tätte.

The film was made in the summer of 2006. It was released in Estonian cinemas on 5 October 2006.

== Cast ==
- Rain Simmul as Toomas
- Mari-Liis Lill as Girl
- Anne Reemann as Anu
- Indrek Taalmaa as Peeter
- Aivar Tommingas as Vorsti-Jüri
- Peeter Tammearu as Meinart
- Kalju Orro as Uugu
- Helene Vannari as Leida
- Arvo Raimo as Eedu
- Rein Oja as Rommi
- Taavi Eelmaa as Miku
- Kalju Komissarov as Rural municipality mayor
- Märt Avandi as Real estate agent
- Kristel Elling as Silvia
- Sulev Teppart as Defender
