= Liis Lindmaa =

Estonian actress

- Born: 20 November 1988 (age 37); Rakvere, then part of Estonian SSR, Soviet Union
- Occupation: Actress
- Years active: 2010 – present
- Children: 1

Liis Lindmaa (born 20 November 1988) is an Estonian stage, television and film actress and television director.

== Early life and education ==
Liis Lindmaa was born and raised in the town of Rakvere in Lääne-Viru County, where she attended primary and secondary schools. She is a 2007 graduate of Rakvere Gymnasium. Afterward, she studied drama at the University of Tartu Viljandi Culture Academy in Viljandi, graduating in 2011.

== Career ==
=== Stage ===
Since 2012, Lindmaa has been engaged as an actress at the Von Krahl Theatre in Tallinn. Some of her more memorable roles to date have been in production of works by such authors, playwrights and screenwriters as: Shakespeare, Dostoyevsky, Ibsen, Lars von Trier, Federico García Lorca and Sarah Kane, among others.

=== Television ===
Lindmaa made her television debut as an actress in 2010 in a small role in the Ilmar Raag directed dramatic television mini-series Klass - Elu pärast, which was a follow-up to the 2007 feature film Klass, about the bullying of two teenage boys which ultimately leads to a school shooting. Other television appearances followed, including the role of Ketlin on an episode of the Kanal 2 crime-drama series Kelgukoerad in 2012; as Marta Valler on an episode of the TV3 comedy-crime series Kättemaksukontor in 2011, and again on two episodes of Kättemaksukontor in 2014 as Ann Madris; and on an episode of the Kanal 2 crime-drama series Viimane võmm in 2014. In 2017 she joined the cast of the Eesti Televisioon (ETV) ten-part drama series Pank as the character Pille, which follows the rise and subsequent misfortunes of a new bank that which emerges in Estonia in the 1990s.

In 2023, Lindmaa began directing the ETV comedy series Elu võimalikkusest maal.

=== Film ===
In 2010, Lindmaa appeared as Liisbet in the dramatic short film Karikakramäng II: Aitäh, et sa minuga juhtusid, directed and produced by Elina Naan. In 2013, Lindmaa made her feature-length film debut in a small role in the Veiko Õunpuu directed drama Free Range/Ballaad maailma heakskiitmisest, starring Lauri Lagle. The following year, she appeared in the role of Riina in the Mihkel Ulk directed drama Nullpunkt, adapted from the 2010 novel of the same name by author Margus Karu. In 2016, Lindmaa played the role of Ester in the Triin Rummet directed comedy-drama Päevad, mis ajasid segadusse; set in the 1990s, the film focuses on a young man (played Hendrik Toompere Jr.) caught between youthful indolence and adult responsibilities during a frantic journey through midsummer Estonia.

== Personal life ==
Liis Lindmaa is in a long-term relationship with Ukrainian-born actor and stage and television director Anatoly Tafitšuk. The couple have a daughter, Frida, born in 2016. The family currently reside in Tallinn.
