= Ott Sepp =

Estonian actor, comedian, singer, writer and television presenter

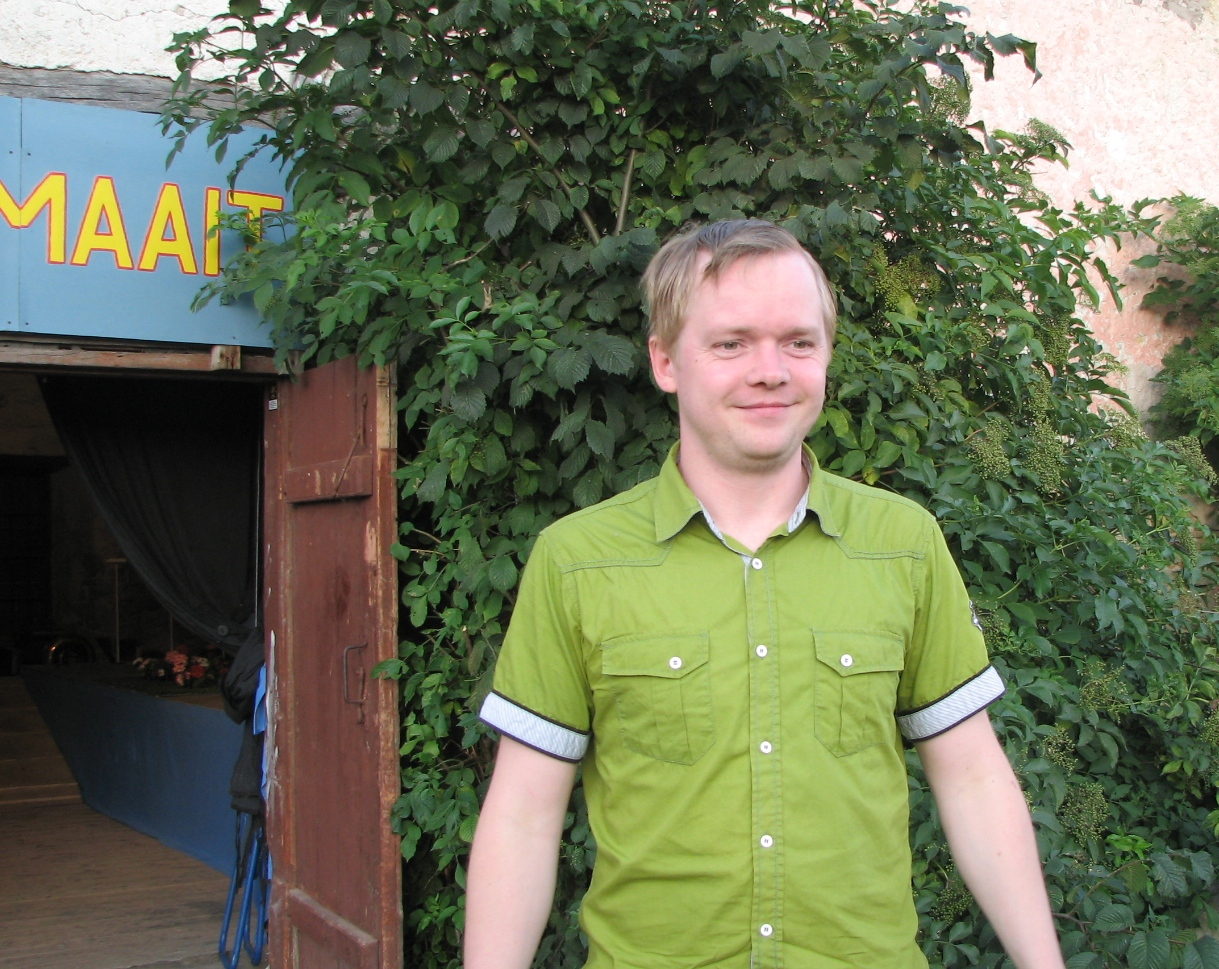
- Ott Sepp after a theatre performance at the Kuressaare Sadamaait in August 2011
- Born: 29 June 1982 (age 43); Tallinn, then part of Estonian SSR, Soviet Union
- Occupation: Actor
- Years active: 2002 – present
- Children: 2

Ott Sepp (born 29 June 1982) is an Estonian actor, comedian, singer, writer and television presenter.

== Career ==
Born in Tallinn, Sepp graduated from the Estonian Academy of Music and Theatre in 2004 and began performing at the Estonian Drama Theatre in 2005. Since 2006 he has been a principal actor at the Vanemuine theater in Tartu. Sepp has had prominent roles in Estonian films such as Names in Marble (2002), Malev (2005) and Tulnukas (2006); the latter two of which also featured his frequent television partner Märt Avandi. The two men have worked together as co-hosts of Eesti otsib superstaari (English: Estonia is Searching for a Superstar, the Estonian version of Pop Idol) in 2008 and performed together on the comedic parody television program Tujurikkuja (2008–2016), as well as co-hosting Eesti laul in both 2010 and 2011. In 2016, Ott Sepp and Märt Avandi hosted the final of Eesti Laul in Saku Suurhall. Eesti laul is Estonia's televised competition to select the country's Eurovision entry and singer.

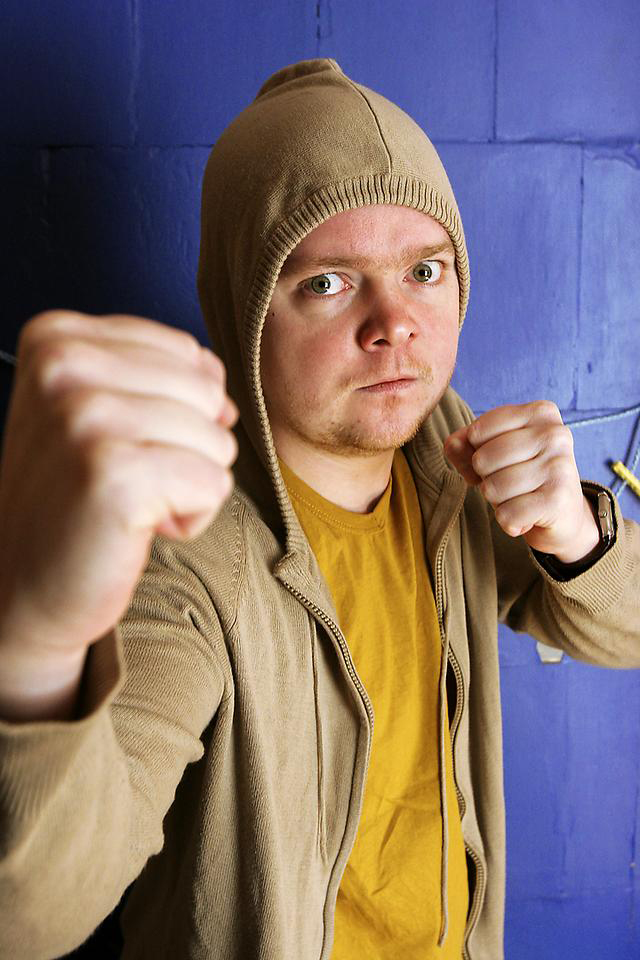
Sepp in 2007

Sepp has appeared in stage productions at the Vanemuine theatre based on the works of: Oskar Luts, Rudyard Kipling, Juhan Liiv, Emily Brontë, George Bernard Shaw, Ole Lund Kirkegaard, Edward Albee and William Shakespeare.

In 2021, Sepp took part in a number of videos titled Toidukool (Food School) promoting meat consumption on the website Lihafaktid (Meat Facts) for the European Livestock Voice, compiled by the Estonian Chamber of Agriculture and Commerce.

== Films ==
- Nimed marmortahvlil (English: Names in Marble) (2002) – Mugur
- Röövlirahnu Martin (2005) – Nitram
- Malev (English release title: Men at Arms) (2005) – Uru Tark
- Tulnukas ehk Valdise pääsemine 11 osas (2006) – Märt
- 2pic (2006) – Punn
- Mis iganes, Aleksander! (2006) – Friend
- Jan Uuspõld läheb Tartusse (English release title: 186 Kilometers) (2007) – Akselerant Ott
- Taarka (2008)
- Kormoranid ehk Nahkpükse ei pesta (2011) – himself, cameo
- Täitsa lõpp (2011) – Ristiga mees
- Seenelkäik (English release title: Mushrooming) (2012) – Sibi
- Sangarid (2017) – Hillbilly
- Klassikokkutulek 3: Ristiisad (2019) – Märten
- Johannes Pääsukese tõeline elu (2019) – Johannes Pääsuke
- Sipsik (2020) - Sipsik (voice)
- Kuulsuse narrid (2023) - Värdi
- Tulnukas 2 ehk Valdise tagasitulek 17 osas (2024) - Märt
- Jan Uuspõld läheb koju (2025) - Krõll

== Television ==
- Buratino tegutseb jälle (2003)
- Eesti otsib superstaari (2008) – himself, presenter
- Tujurikkuja (2008 – 2015) – various roles and scriptwriter
- Kättemaksukontor (2009 – 2011, 2013, 2017, 2018) – Policeman Kaspar Tuvi
- Eesti Laul 2010 (2010) – himself, presenter
- Riigimehed (2010) – Turvamees
- Eesti Laul 2011 (2011) – himself, presenter
- Eesti Laul 2016 (2016) - himself, presenter
- Eesti Laul 2018 (2018) - himself, presenter
- Süü (2021) - Miko Kurm

== Awards and recognition ==
- Colleague of the Year (Vanemuine theatre) (2007)
- Young Culture of the City of Tartu (2008)
- The Oskar Luts Humor Prize (2011)
