= Mart Kivastik =

Estonian film director and writer

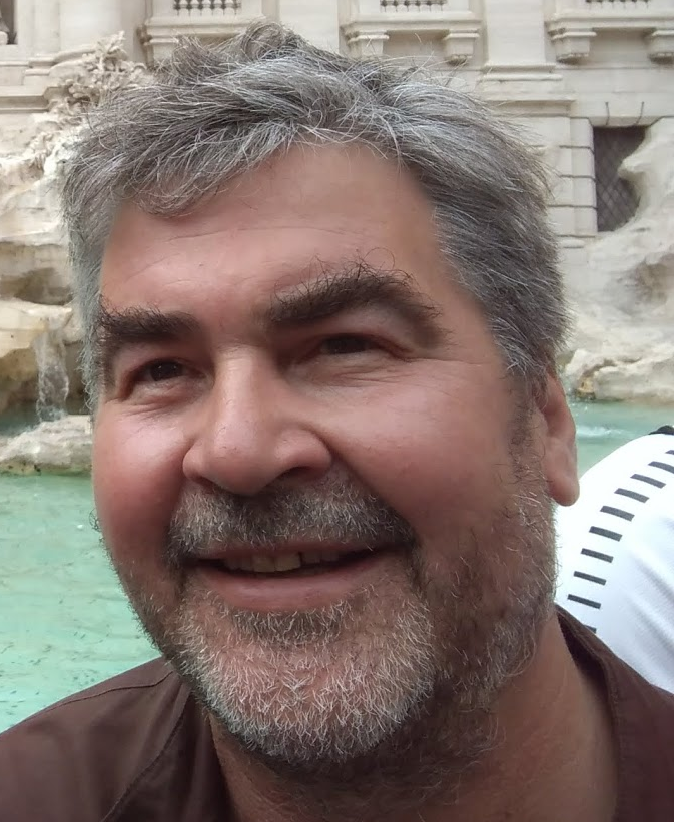
Mart Kivastik (2019)

Mart Kivastik (born 4 March 1963 in Tartu) is an Estonian film director, screenwriter, playwright and novelist.

In 1981–1991 he worked as an editor in Tallinnfilm. Since 1991 he is a freelance writer.

== Selected filmography ==
- 1997: E2-E4 (feature film; screenwriter)
- 2008: Taarka (feature film; screenwriter)
- 2009: Vasha (feature film; screenwriter)
- 2011: Üks mu sõber (feature film; director and screenwriter)
- 2016: Õnn tuleb magades (feature film; director and screenwriter)
- 2023: Taevatrepp (feature film; director and screenwriter, based on the novel of the same name by Kivastik)
