= Obinitsa graveyard =

Cemetery in Estonia

Coordinates: 57°48′56″N 27°26′35″E

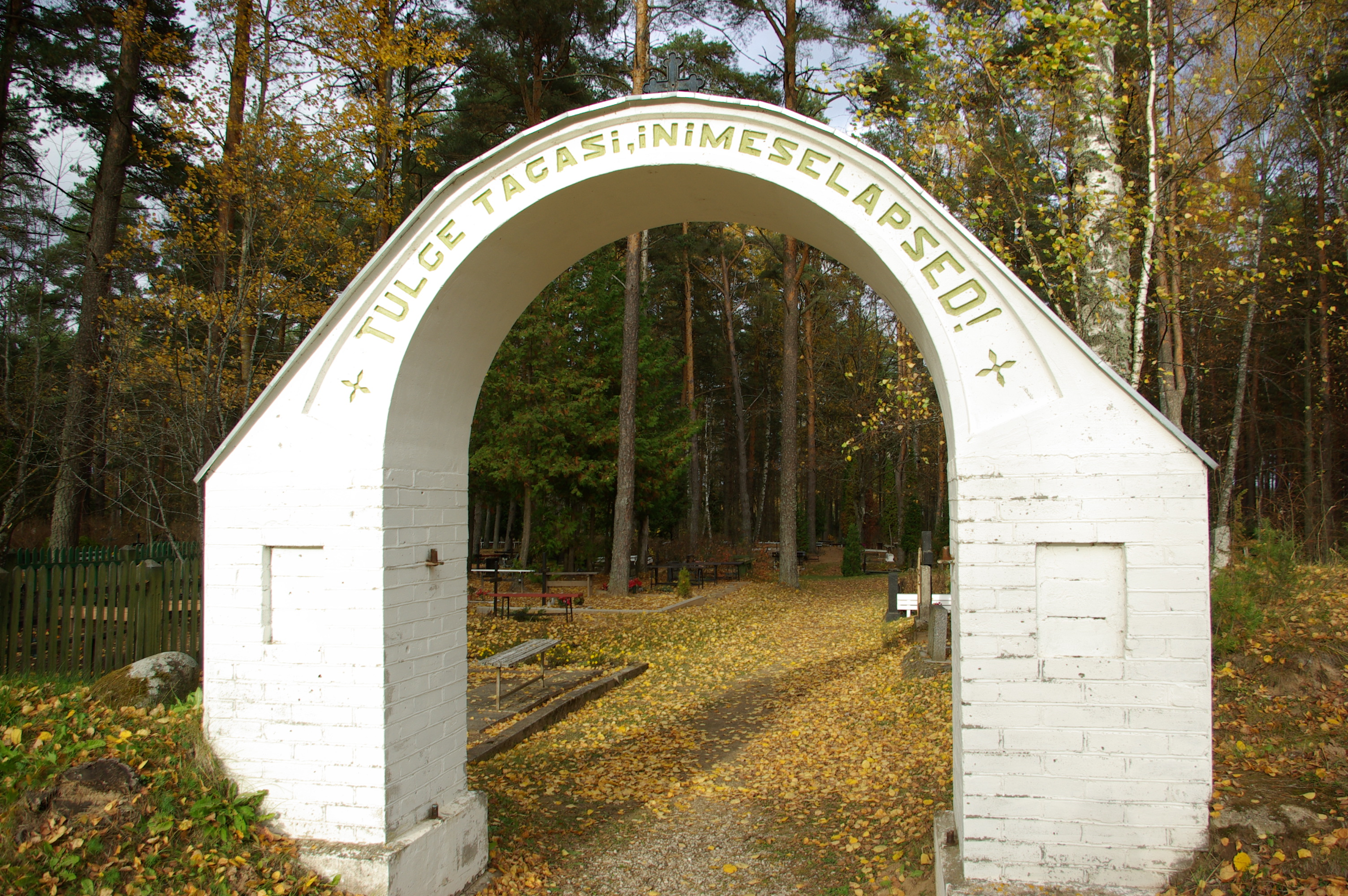
Obinitsa graveyard

Obinitsa graveyard is a graveyard in Setomaa, Estonia. It is in Meremäe rural municipality in Obinitsa village. The graveyard is the public property of Meremäe rural municipality, but belongs under the Obinitsa Church of Transfiguration of Our Lord. Obinitsa graveyard was established about 1500 years ago. The oldest part of the graveyard is the Sakalovapalo burial mound. The other part was established in the beginning of the 19th century. Among others, the grave of the Hilana Taarka, the singing mother (1856-1933) is situated in Obinitsa graveyard. The newer part of the graveyard was taken into use in the lower part of the land, near Tuhkvitsa Stream.

In 1950, when church activity in Obinitsa Church-School was stopped, the building of a new church began in the one hectare land next to the graveyard. This sort of activity was grounded on the Soviet Lenin decree that said the school had to be separated from the church and the church building taken from the congregation for the school. This sort of activity was based on a written regulation of the former chairman of the Estonian SSR Council of Ministers, Arnold Veimer to the chairman of the Meremäe rural municipality Executive Committee. In 1950, the local priest Vilemon Talomees, supported by the local community, began to build a new church despite obstacles. At first, he was working alone; later the members of the congregation joined him on his initiative and request. In 1951, they came across many difficulties that interfered the building of the church. Even Võru County deanery did not support the building, as they were busy building Meeksi Church at the time. Regardless, on 9 January 1952, interior decorating of the church began. Valga Church gave Obinitsa congregation the assets from Tõrva Church (church bell, icons, chandelier, candle sticks, altar and service clothes for the priest). A lot of donations (building materials) were made by the local farmers; there was no money to pay wages. Support was provided by the Bishopric of Estonia as well. The church, still surrounded by scaffolding was inaugurated on 15 June 1952. Bishop of Tallinn, Roman inaugurated the Obinitsa Apostolic Orthodox Church in the honour of Transfiguration of Our Lord. The greatest church and graveyard feast is Passover, when people gather at the graves of their ancestors to commemorate their loved ones. There are thousands of people in the graveyard on that particular day and after church service, a memorial meal takes place on the graves and prayers are said.
