= Kose =

Borough in Estonia

- Small borough
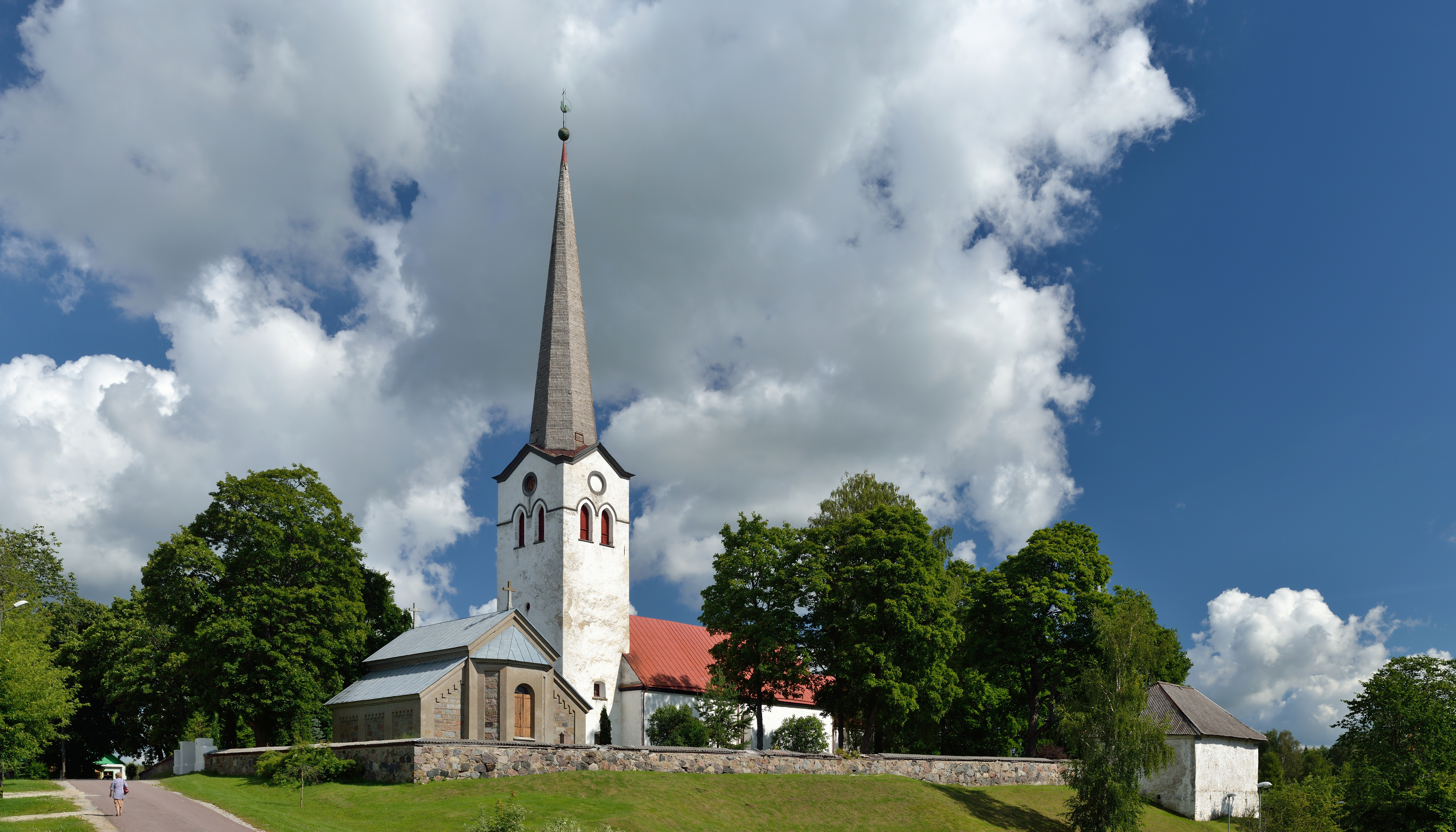
- Kose church dates back to 1230s

- Location in Estonia
- Coordinates: 59°11′11″N 25°10′05″E
- Country: Estonia
- County: Harju County
- Municipality: Kose Parish

Area
  - Total: 3 km^{2} (1.2 sq mi)

Population (2019)
  - Total: 2,020

Drone video of Kose, Pirita river and Kose church (September 2021)

Kose (German: Kosch) is a small borough (Estonian: alevik) in Harju County, 39 kilometers (24 miles) southeast of Tallinn, Estonia. It is the administrative centre of Kose Parish and lies next to Pirita River.

At the 2011 Census, the settlement's population was 2,097.

It was first mentioned in the Danish Census Book as Cosius in 1241.

== Notable people ==
- Otto von Kotzebue (1787–1846), Baltic German navigator, is buried at the churchyard of Kose St. Nicholas Church
- Liivo Leetma (born 1977), footballer, played 327 games and 36 for Estonia
- Risto Kübar (born 1983), stage, voice, and film actor.
- Rauno Roosnurm (born 1991), known as Mord Fustang, musician, DJ and music producer

== Gallery ==
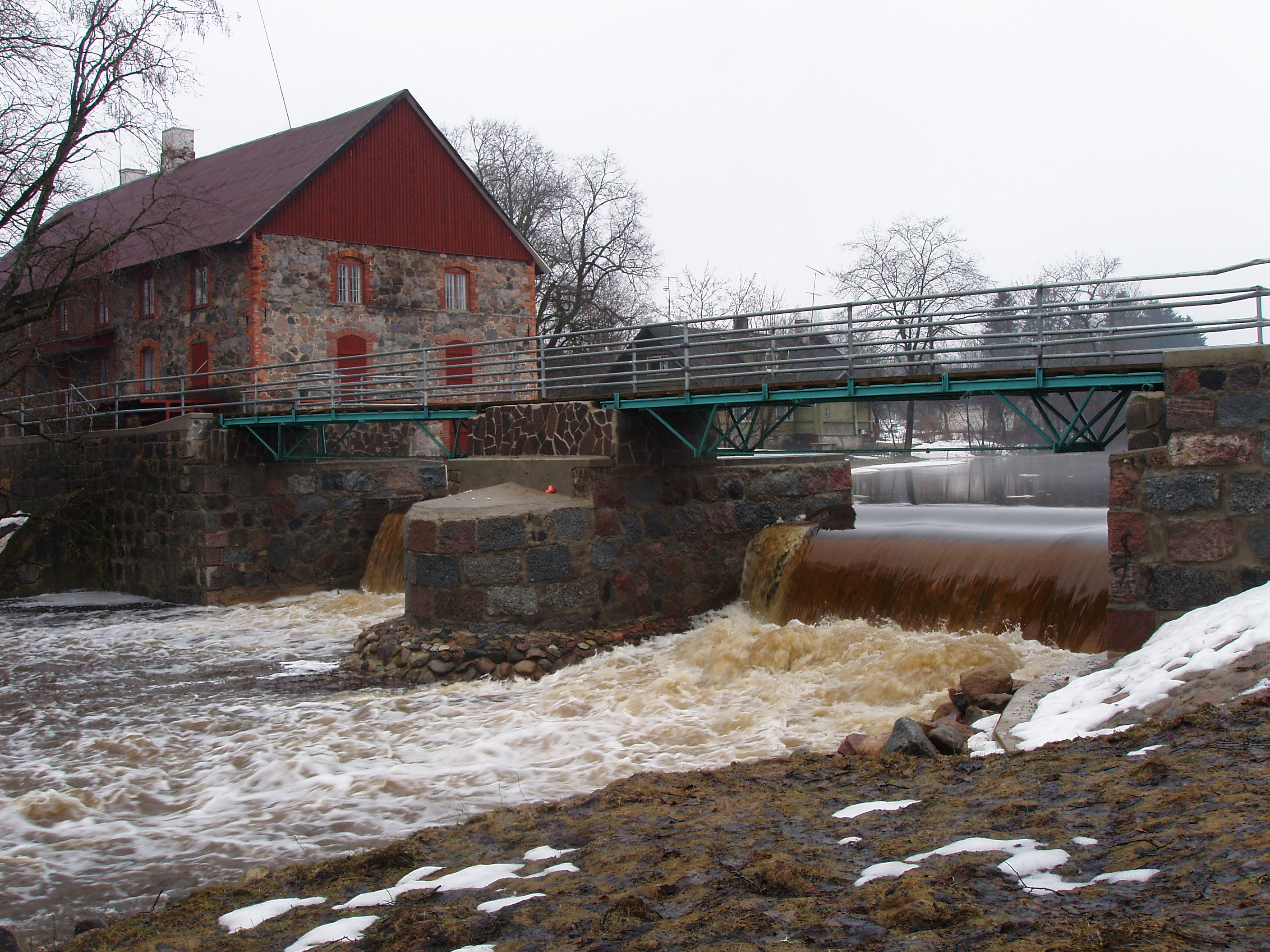
Footbridge over Pirita river

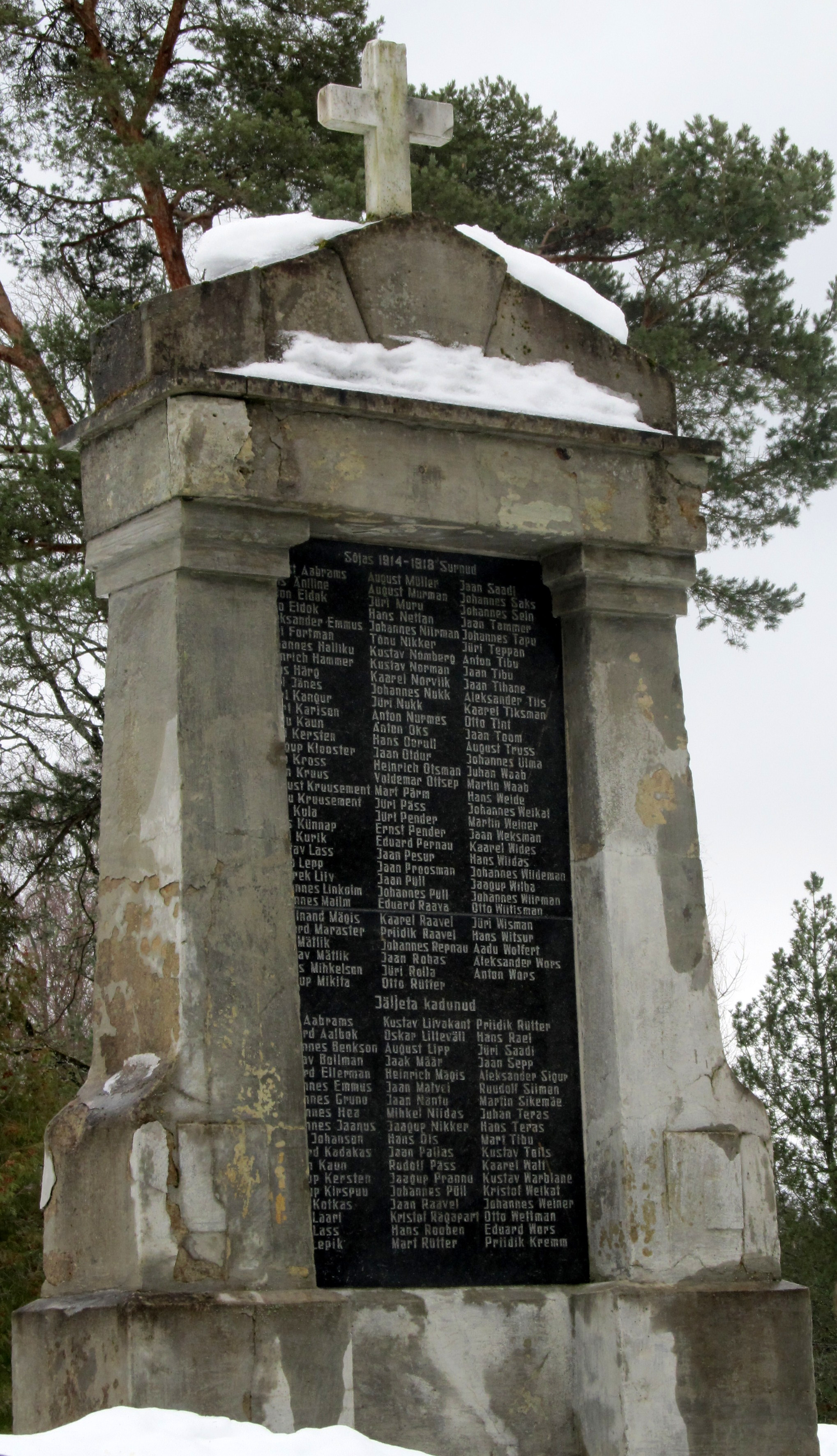
Monument to the War of Independence

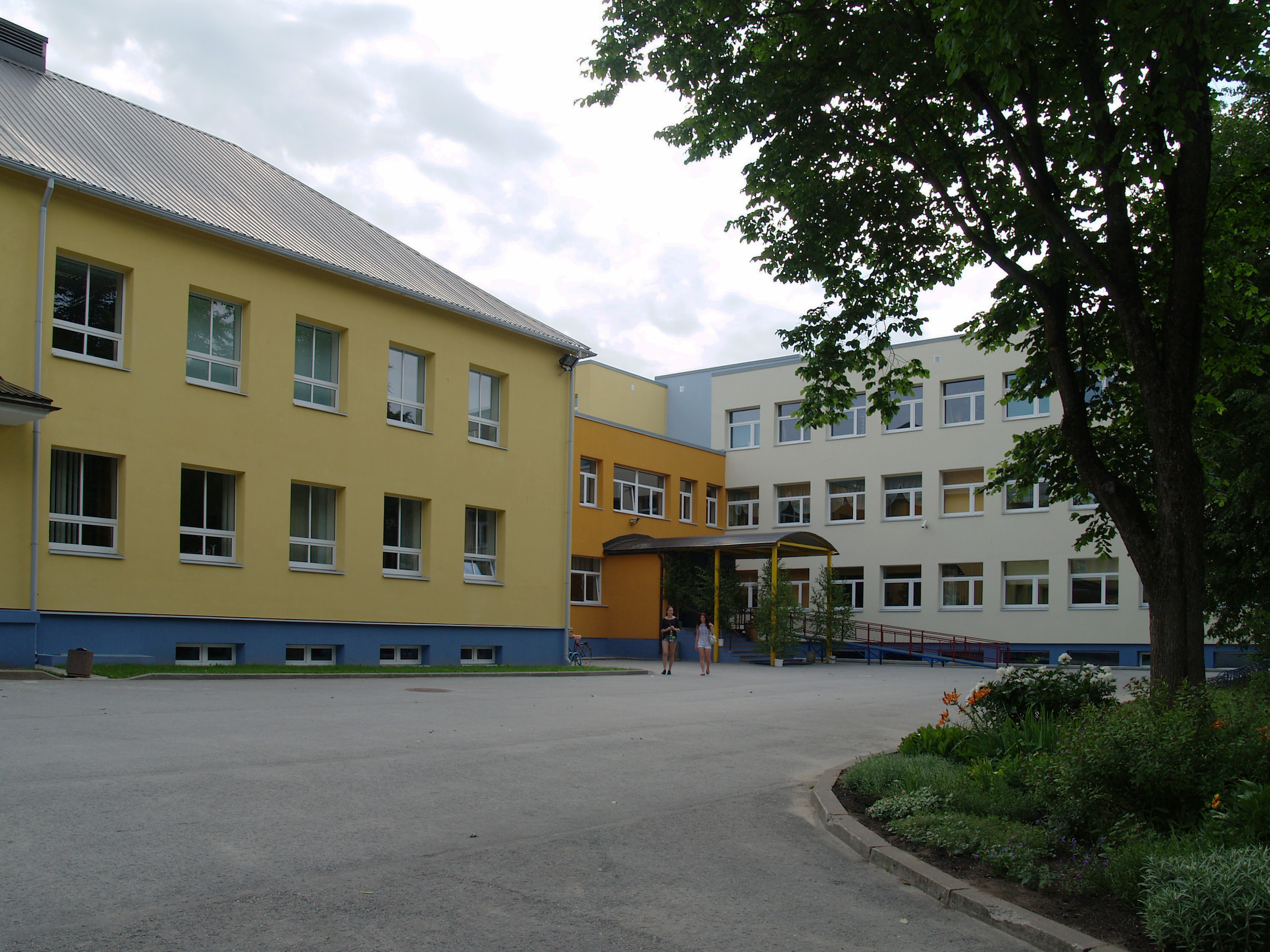
Kose school

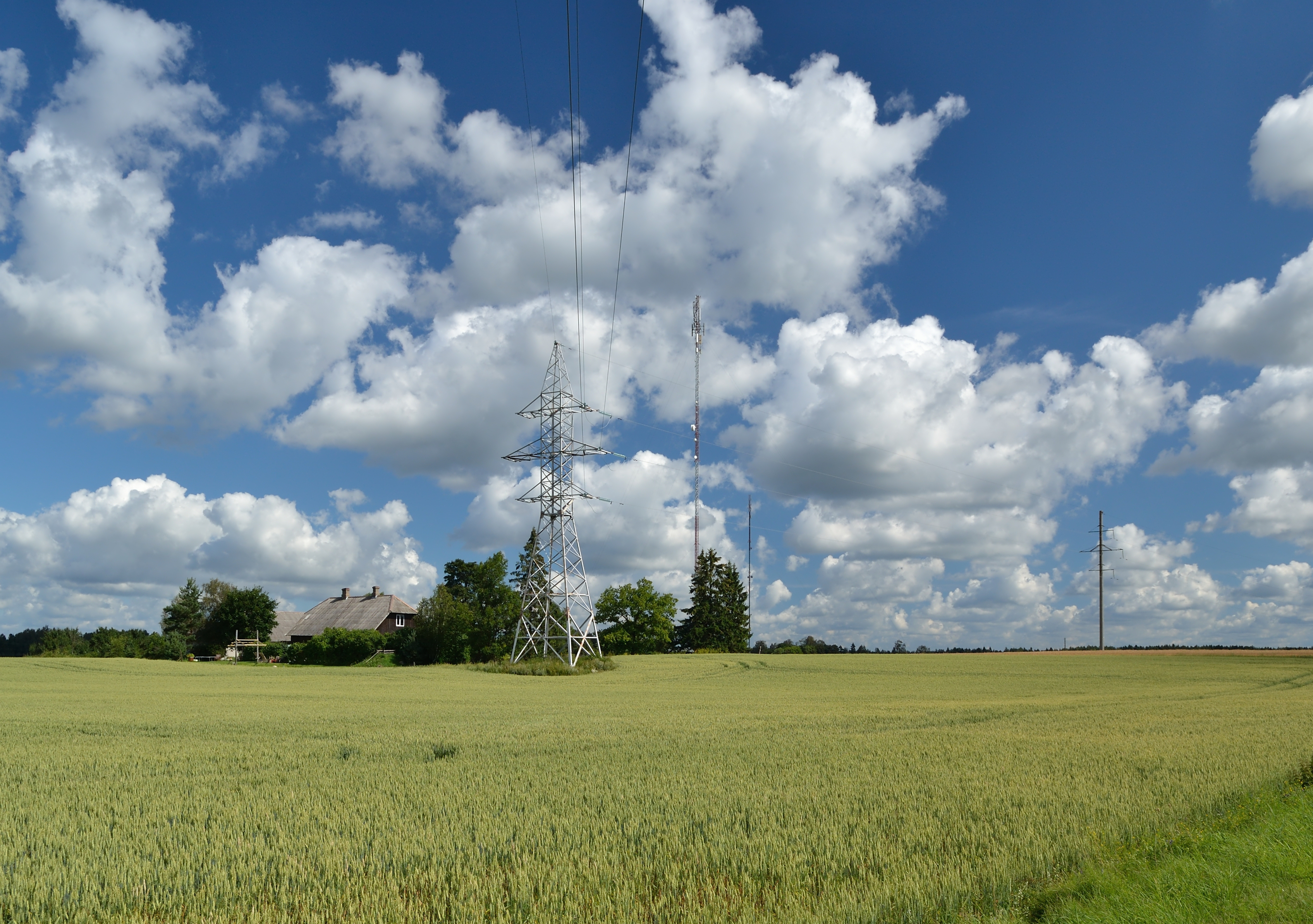
Wheat fields in Kose
