= Priit Pedajas =

Estonian actor and theatre director (born 1954)

- Born: 21 January 1954 (age 72); Tallinn, then part of Estonian SSR, Soviet Union
- Occupations: Actor; theater director
- Years active: 1979–present

Priit Pedajas (born 21 January 1954) is an Estonian actor and theatre director.

== Biography ==
Pedajas was born 21 January 1954 in Tallinn.

In 1976, he graduated from the Tallinn State Conservatory' Performing Arts Department. From 1979 until 1985, he was an actor and director at Ugala Theatre. From 1985 until 1991, he was a director at Endla Theatre. From 1991 until 1999, he was the director of the Estonian Drama Theatre. From 1999 until 2018, he was the principal stage manager (Estonian: peanäitejuht) of Estonian Drama Theatre.

Besides theatre, he has also appeared in a number of films and on television.

== Awards ==
- 2001: Order of the White Star, IV class.

== Filmography ==
- 1977: Põrgupõhja uus Vanapagan
- 1980: Jõulud Vigalas
- 2008: Detsembrikuumus
- 2017: Mehetapja/Süütu/Vari
