= Märt Avandi =

Estonian actor and comedian

- Born: 26 February 1981 (age 45); Rapla, then part of Estonian SSR, Soviet Union
- Occupation: Actor
- Years active: 2004-present
- Spouse: Liis-Katrin Mägi (2007)

Märt Avandi (born 26 February 1981) is an Estonian actor and comedian.

== Biography ==
He is known in Estonia for his performances in TV show Tujurikkuja (2008–2015) with Ott Sepp.

Avandi has worked as an actor in Rakvere Theatre (2004–2006), Endla Theatre (2006–2008; 2015–...) and Estonian Drama Theatre (2009–2014).

He is the chairman and spokesperson for the Estonian Union of Parents with Children with Cancer and organizer of rubber duck races for charity.

== Selected filmography ==
Films

Year	Film	Role	Film gross	Notes
2005	Malev	Hippolyt		
2006	Tulnukas ehk Valdise pääsemine 11 osas	Valdis		
2006	Meeletu	Estate agent		
2008	Mina olin siin	Aivo		
2010	Punane elavhõbe	Sander	11 million EEK	
2013	Elavad pildid	Raimond		
2015	Vehkleja	Endel Nelis		
2019	Johannes Pääsukese tõeline elu	Harri Volter		
2019	Kohtunik	Brother		
2019	Vanamehe film	Lehm		Voice
2024	Tulnukas 2 ehk Valdise tagasitulek 17 osas	Valdis		

Television

Year	Title	Role	Notes
2007	Eesti otsib superstaari	Host	
2007	Oma Maapäev	Viktor Kingissepp	
2008	Tuulepealne maa	Indrek Kallaste	
2008	Tujurikkuja	Himself	
2009	Kättemaksukontor	Gerth Maango	
2012	Tupiktänava mehed	Raul	
2012	Nurjatud tüdrukud	Markus Tamm	
2015	Mustad lesed	Erno	
2015–2018	Su nägu kõlab tuttavalt	Host	
