= Ain Mäeots =

Estonian actor and director (born 1971)

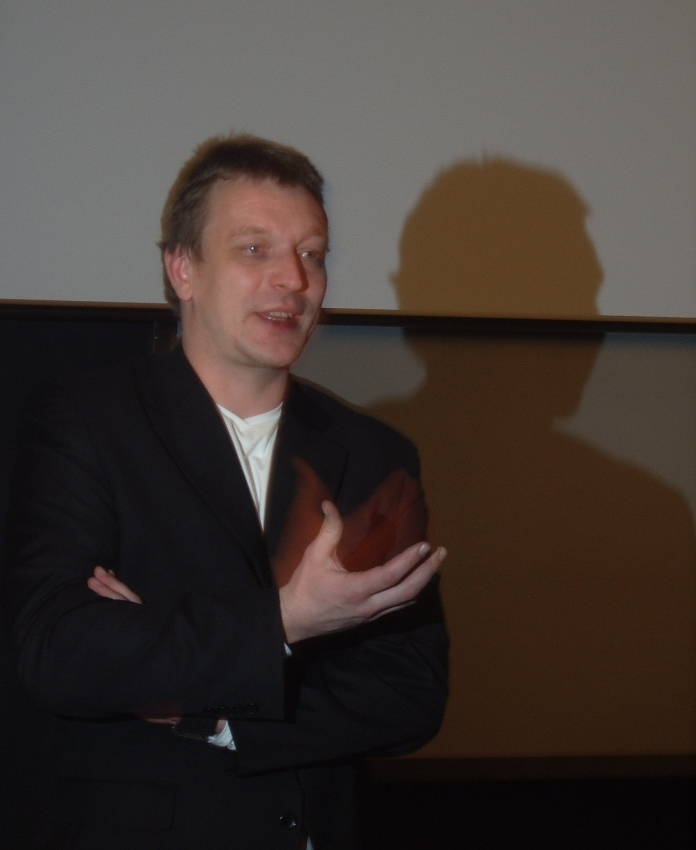
- Born: 25 December 1971 (age 54); Võru, then part of Estonian SSR, Soviet Union
- Occupations: Actor, director
- Years active: 1994 – present
- Spouse(s): Kristel Mäeots (née Luts) (m. 2004; div. 2018)
- Children: 5

Ain Mäeots (born 25 December 1971) is an Estonian stage, film, and television actor and stage, film, and television director and producer.

== Early life and education ==
Ain Mäeots was born in Võru, Võru County, in 1971. He has one brother. He is a 1994 graduate of the Tallinn Conservatory (now, the Estonian Academy of Music and Theatre) in Tallinn, under instruction of theatre pedagogue and director Ingo Normet. His classmates included Mait Malmsten, Liisa Aibel, Katariina Lauk, Indrek Sammul, and Andres Puustusmaa. His diploma productions included roles in Anton Chekhov's Three Sisters, and Madis Kõiv and Aivo Lõhmus' Põud ja vihm Põlva kihelkonnan nelätõistkümnendäma aasta suvõl in 1993, and Paul-Eerik Rummo's Tuhkatriinumäng in 1994.

== Stage career ==
Following graduation in 1994, Mäeots began an engagement at the Vanemuine theatre in Tartu, where he is still currently employed. From 1994 until 1999, he was both an actor and stage director at the theatre. From 1999 until 2006, he was the head of the Vanemuine's drama department, and from 2006 until the present, he was once again a stage director and actor. Some of his earliest work at the Vanemuine included productions of William Shakespeare's King Lear and August Kitzberg's Kaval-Ants ja Vanapagan. During his many years at the Vanemuine, he has performed as an actor in and director of works by such varied authors and playwrights as: Reginald Rose, Tom Stoppard, Jean Anouilh, Karl Ristikivi, Mikhail Bulgakov, Émile Zola, Martin McDonagh, Arthur Miller, Leonard Bernstein, Ingmar Bergman, and Rodgers and Hammerstein, among many others.

He has also appeared onstage as an actor in several other theatres in Estonia, including Old Baskin's Theatre in Tallinn, and both the Hansahoovi Theatre MTÜ, and Emajõgi River Summer Theatre in Tartu. He has also appeared onstage in productions in Finland; at the Tampere Theatre in 2003 and the Seinäjoki City Theatre in 2015.

== Television career ==
Ain Mäeots' first substantial role as a television actor came in 1995, playing the role of Juhan Pukspuu in the 1995 Vilja Palm directed Eesti Televisioon (ETV) period drama mini-series Wikmani poised, adapted from the 1988 semi-autobiographical Jaan Kross novel of the same name. Mäeots has also made appearances on a number of television series including: the long-running drama serial Õnne 13 in 2003, the ETV crime drama Ohtlik lend in 2007, the ETV political satire series Riigimehed in 2010, the Kanal 2 crime drama aeries Viimane võmm in 2015, and the ETV drama Vabad mehed in 2015. In 2012, Mäeots plated the character Peeter Tahel in four episodes of the popular TV3 comedy-crime series Kättemaksukontor.

Apart from acting, Mäeots has worked as both a director and producer on the ETV comedy series ENSV; set in the early 1980s, the series humorously reflects on life in the Estonian Soviet Socialist Republic and premiered in 2010.

== Film ==
Ain Mäeots' first film role as an actor was a small role in the 2000 Mare Raidma directed short Lunastus, for Faama Film and Eesti Televisioon. In 2005, he appeared in his first feature-length film as Lembitu in the Kaaren Kaer directed comedy Malev; a skewed interpretation of Estonia's history set in the year 1208. In 2007, he made a cameo appearance in the Rain Tolk and Andres Maimik directed comedy Jan Uuspõld läheb Tartusse (English release title: 186 Kilometers), in which Estonian actor Jan Uuspõld plays a down-on-his-luck caricature of himself, trying to hitchhike from Tallinn to Tartu to perform in a role at the Vanemuine theater.

In 2008, Mäeots made his debut as a film director with the Exitfilm biography Taarka, based on the play of the same name by Kauksi Ülle about the difficult life of Seto folk singer Hilana Taarka. Taarka has the distinction of being the first feature-length film in the Seto dialect. Mäeots also made a brief appearance in the film in the role of a villager. Taarka won the 2008 Estonian Cultural Endowment Debut Award.

In 2012, he co-wrote and directed his second film, the drama Deemonid. The film chronicles the unraveling of three people who enter a casino and subsequently confronting their inner demons.

In 2013, he appeared as Erik in the Hardi Volmer directed historical melodrama feature film Elavad pildid, which follows two Estonians, a girl and a boy, born at the beginning of the 20th-century in a Baltic German manor, through the coming decades and all of the revolutions, wars, military occupations, regime collapses, and new beginnings.

In 2015, he played the role of Captain Evald Viires in the Elmo Nüganen directed war film 1944. The film is set in World War II and is shown through the eyes of Estonian soldiers who had to pick sides and thus fight against their fellow countrymen. It was selected as the Estonian entry for the Best Foreign Language Film at the 88th Academy Awards but it was not nominated. In 2019, he played the role of Joosep in the Mart Sander directed fantasy-horror film Kõhedad muinaslood.

In 2023, he directed the historical feature film comedy Kuulsuse narrid, adapted from the 1892 story of the same name by Eduard Bornhöhe.

== Personal life ==
Ain Mäeots was married to Kristel Mäeots from 2004 to 2018. The couple had four children. He also has an older son from a previous relationship.
