= Hilana Taarka =

Estonian singer

Hilana Taarka (real name Darja Matrejeva, also Darja Pisumaa and Vasila Taarka; 22 March 1856 – 27 December 1933) was an Estonian (Seto) folk singer. She is known as "Seto Lauluimä" (lit. 'Seto Mother of Song').

Hilana Taarka was born in the small village of Hilande in Setomaa, from which she later took her name. Almost all her life was spent in poverty.

Her most notable achievement was to sing at the Helsinki Song Festival in 1921. Kaarlo Juho Ståhlberg, the first president of Finland was also present at the festival.

Hilana Taarka died in Võmmorski in 1933, aged 77. She is buried at Obinitsa graveyard.

In 2008, a biographical feature film, Taarka, was released by Exitfilm. The film was based on a play by the same name by Kauksi Ülle and was directed by Ain Mäeots. Actresses Inga Salurand, Siiri Sisask and Marje Metsur portrayed Taarka at various stages in her life. Taarka has the distinction of being the first feature-length film in the Seto dialect.

In 2019, actress Merle Jääger appeared as Hilana Taarka in the Hardi Volmer-directed historical comedy film Johannes Pääsukese tõeline elu.

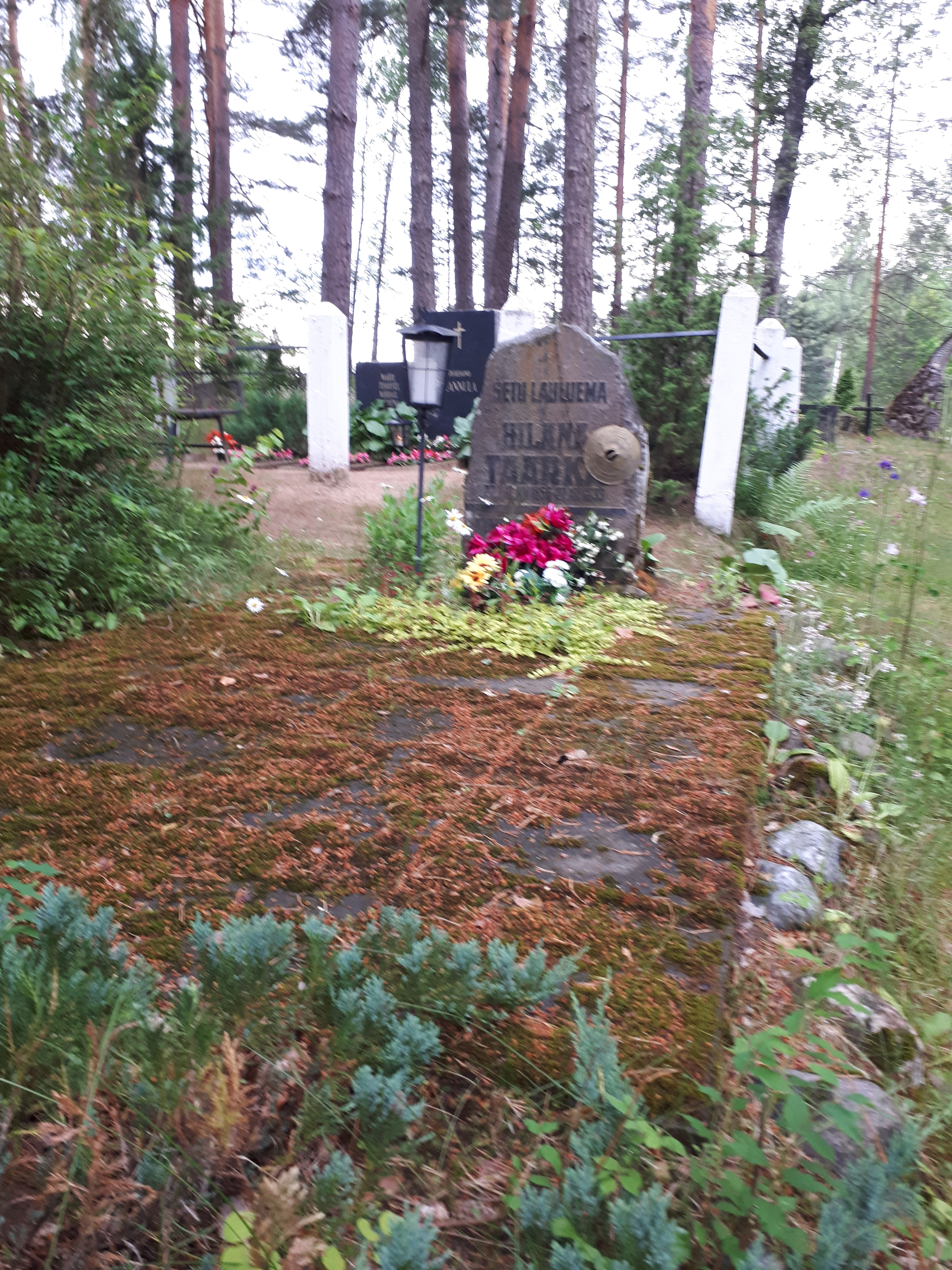
Hilana Taarka's grave in Obinitsa graveyard
