= Vanalinnastuudio =

Theatre in Tallinn, Estonia

Vanalinnastuudio (literally 'Old Town Studio') was a theatre in Tallinn, Estonia.

The theatre was established in 1980. At the beginning, it operated at Estonian State Philharmony (nowadays Eesti Kontsert). The founder and artistical leader was Eino Baskin. In 1980, the theatre has 9 actors. E.g., in 2003, the theatre has 14 actors.

In 1989, the theatre was disjointed from Estonian State Philharmony and become independent theatre.

The theatre was closed in 2004. Throughout its existence, the theatre didn't have its own theatre house.

== See also ==
- Theatre NO99
