= Anneli Ahven =

Estonian film producer

Anneli Ahven (born 27 January 1972 in Tallinn) is an Estonian film producer.

From 1993 to 1999 she graduated from Estonian Institute of Humanities in germanistics. In 2002 she defended her master's thesis at Hamburg University. Since 1995 she is working for Exitfilm.

She also lectures in Film Production at Tallinn University's Media and Art School.

She has participated in the production of over 30 films.

== Filmography ==
Her filmography includes;

- 2015: "Must alpinist"
- 2015: "Tiibadeta piloot"
- 2016: "Õnn tuleb magades"
- 2017: "Kolm päeva augustis"
- 2019: "Johannes Pääsukese tõeline elu"
- 2021: "Sandra saab tööd"
- 2022 "Language Rebel. Mati Hint"
- 2024 "Ellujäämise kunstnikud"

She was also an assistant director on 2000's Foreign Fields.
