= Kauksi Ülle =

Estonian writer

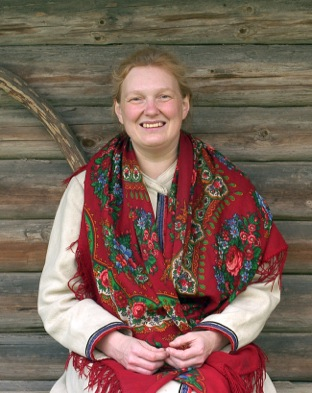
- Born: Ülle Kahusk; 23 September 1962 (age 63); Võru, then part of Estonian SSR, Soviet Union
- Occupation: Writer
- Spouse: Evar Riitsaa

Kauksi Ülle (born Ülle Kahusk 23 September 1962) is an Estonian writer.

== Life and work ==
Kauksi Ülle sees herself as a South Estonian writer who is closely connected to the customs and history of South Estonia. Therefore, according to the tradition of her homeland, she often appears under the name Kauksi Ülle. She writes consistently in Võro and is committed to reviving the language. Her work is attributed to ethnofuturism. Kauksi Ülle now lives in Obinitsa.

Kauksi Ülle grew up in the countryside in Võru County. She attended school in Rõuge and Võru. In 1986, she graduated from the University of Tartu with a degree in journalism. She then worked in the editorial department of the magazine Kultuur ja Elu, in the Tartuer Dépendance of the Estonian Writers' Union, at Võru Raadio and in the Fenno-Ugria Foundation, which she has headed since 1998.

== Works ==
=== Poems ===
- 1987 Kesk umma mäke
- 1989 Hanõ vai luigõ
- 1991 Jyriyy
- 1995 Agu ni Eha. Morn and Eve (Võro and English)
- 1996 Kuldnaanõ. Kultanainen (Võro and Finnish)
- 2001 Nõsõq rõõmu mõrsija
- 2003 Käänüpäiv
- 2005 Emaemamaa
- 2012 Palunõiaq
- 2012 Valit luulõq

=== Prose ===
- 1997 Säng
- 1998 Paat
- 2000 Huuv'
- 2003 Uibu

=== Drama ===
- 2004 Taarka
- 2006 Kuus tükkü
