= Sergo Vares =

Estonian actor

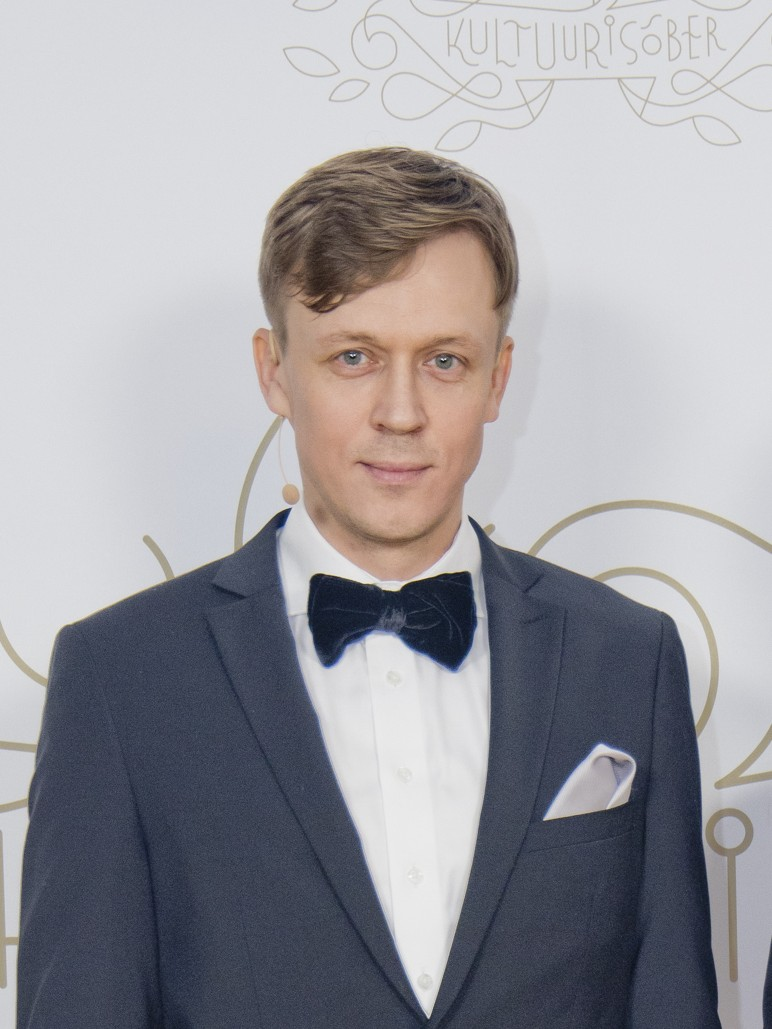
Sergo Vares, 2022

Sergo Vares (born 14 September 1982) is an Estonian actor.

Sergo Vares was born in Rakvere. He graduated from Rakvere Gymnasium in 2001. In 2002, he enrolled at the University of Tartu to study journalism, but left to study acting at the Estonian Academy of Music and Theatre under course instructor Priit Pedajas, graduating in 2006. From 2006 until 2012, he worked at the NO99 Theatre. Besides theatre roles he has played also in several films and television series.

== Filmography ==
- 2005: Malev
- 2006: Leiutajateküla Lotte (animated film; voice)
- 2006: Maraton (animated short; voice)
- 2007: Ohtlik Lend (TV series; one episode)
- 2008: Detsembrikuumus
- 2008: Tujurikkuja (TV Movie)
- 2009: Kättemaksukontor
- 2010: Class: Life After (TV mini series; one episode)
- 2011: IT-planeet
- 2011-2013: Päikese Poole
- 2011: Idioot
- 2012-2013: Revenge Office
- 2015: Hamlet
- 2017: Mehetapja/Süütu/Vari
- 2018: McMafia (TV series; one episode)
- 2018: Pank
- 2020: Tenet
- 2024: The Unstruck Sound (Short)
- 2026: Space Security Service (Podcast series; voice; one episode)
