= Madis Kõiv =

Estonian writer, philosopher and physicist

- Born: 5 December 1929; Tartu, Estonia
- Died: 24 September 2014 (aged 85); Tartu, Estonia
- Occupations: Writer, philosopher, physicist
- Years active: 1953–2014

Madis Kõiv (5 December 1929 – 24 September 2014) was an Estonian physicist, philosopher and writer.

== Education ==
Kõiv attended school in Tartu after the second World War, graduating in the early 1950s with a degree in nuclear physics. Kõiv worked as a scientist and lecturer until 1991.

== Career as a playwright ==
Kõiv always entertained a fascination with and love for literature. He wrote mostly for personal entertainment until the 1950s, when he became active in Estonian literary circles. His earliest published works were written with friends from these circles. He also wrote under a pseudonym for several years.

His first published work was a play called Küüni täitmine (Filling the Hay Barn) written as a collaboration between Kõiv (using his pseudonym Jaanus Andreus Nooremb) and Hando Runnel in 1978. In 1999, the play was successfully produced for the first time.

Kõiv then wrote two pieces with Vaino Vahing. The first was a play titled Faehlmann. Keskpäev. Õhtuselgus. (Faehlmann. Noon. Evening Clarity.) The two also wrote the dialogue novel Endspiel. Laskumine orgu. (Endspiel. Descent into the Valley.)

Just before the end of the decade, Kõiv began to publish works he had previously written for his own amusement under his own name. Kõiv became the most essential Estonian playwright of the 1950s and 1960s.

In the early 1990s, Kõiv began to gain fame. In 1991 and 1993, he won the Tuglas short story award for Film and The Life of an Eternal Physicus, respectively. He won the annual Estonian literary award in 1991 for The Meeting. He won the annual Estonian literary award again in 1995 for The Philosopher's Day and Return to Father. Kõiv won the award a third time in 1999 for Scenes From the Hundred Years' War.

Kõiv had released only 22 of the plays he had written and said that these comprise half of the dramatic literature he has created.

== Career as a novelist ==
Kõiv was also the author of several novels. Widow and Aporia of Attica, Tragedy of Elea are two of his best known. In 1996 he published Aken. Kõiv wrote the novel in the 1960s, but it did not pass during the Soviet occupation of censorship.

== Philosophy ==
Madis Kõiv was one of the many proponents of analytical philosophy in Estonia. In 1991, he became one of the initiators of the Seminar of Analytical Philosophy.

== Memoirs ==
Kõiv's memoirs (the series Studia memoriae) consist largely of introspection, in sharp contrast to a typical biography.

== Sources ==
- Estonian Literary Magazine
