= Mari-Liis Lill =

Estonian actress (born 1983)

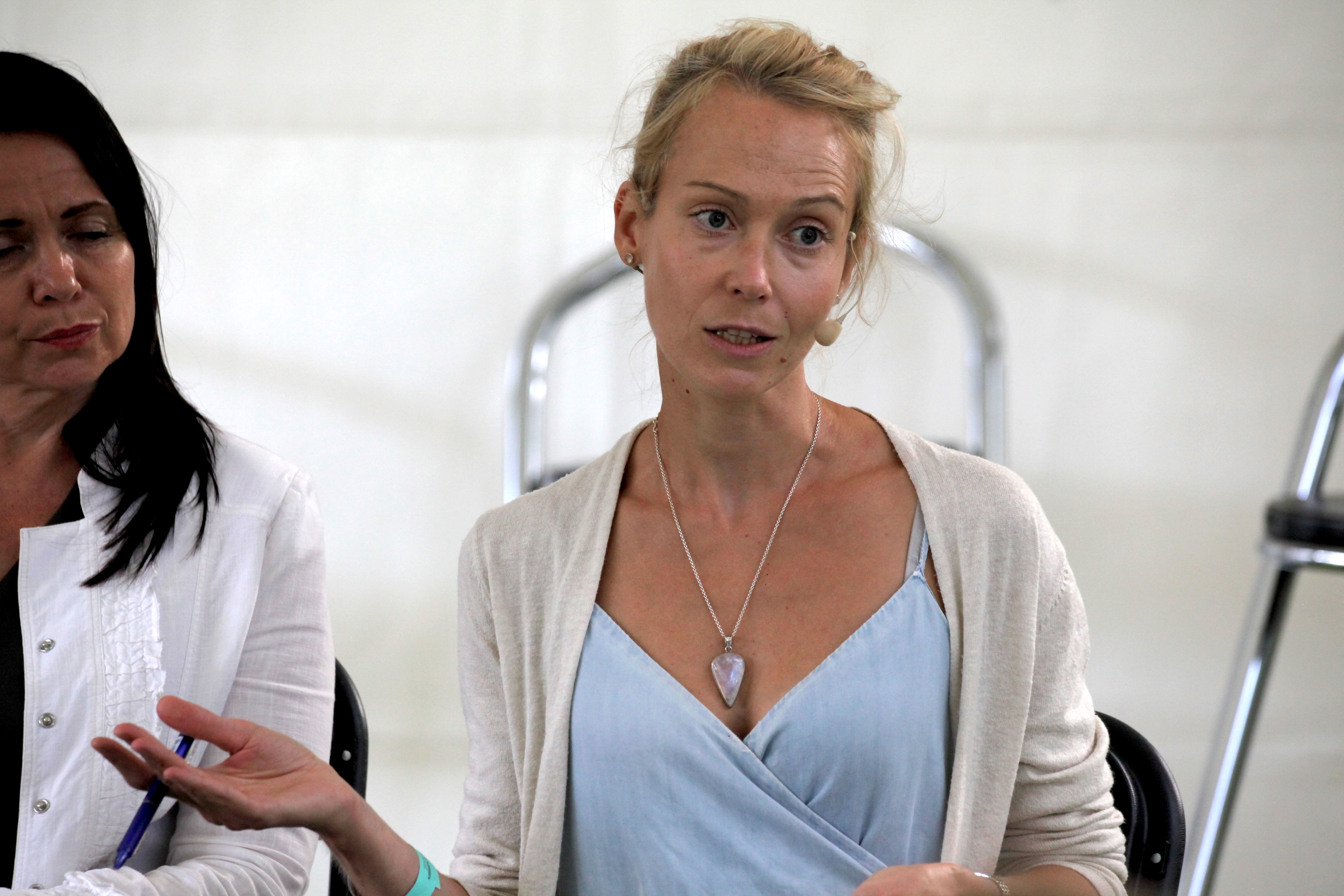
Lill in 2021

Mari-Liis Lill (born 23 May 1983) is an Estonian actress.

Lill was born in Tallinn. She graduated from the Estonian Academy of Music and Theatre in 2006. From 2006 until 2015, she was engaged at the Estonian Drama Theatre.

Besides stage roles he has also participated on several films.

In 2021 she was awarded with Order of the White Star, V class.

Lill is in a relationship with actor and musician Ivo Uukkivi. The couple have a son, born in 2011.

== Filmography ==
- 2006 "Meeletu" – a girl
- 2006/2007 "Ringtee"
- 2007 "Jan Uuspõld läheb Tartusse" – Marion
- 2007 "Detour/Võõras" – Anna
- 2011 "Kirjad Inglile" – occulist
- 2012 "Seenelkäik" – a local woman
- 2016 "Õnn tuleb magades" – Luisa
- 2018 "Tuliliilia" – Annely
- 2020 "Kratt" – Mother
