= Theatre NO99 =

Theatre in Tallinn, Estonia

Coordinates: 59°25′56.83″N 24°45′0.13″E

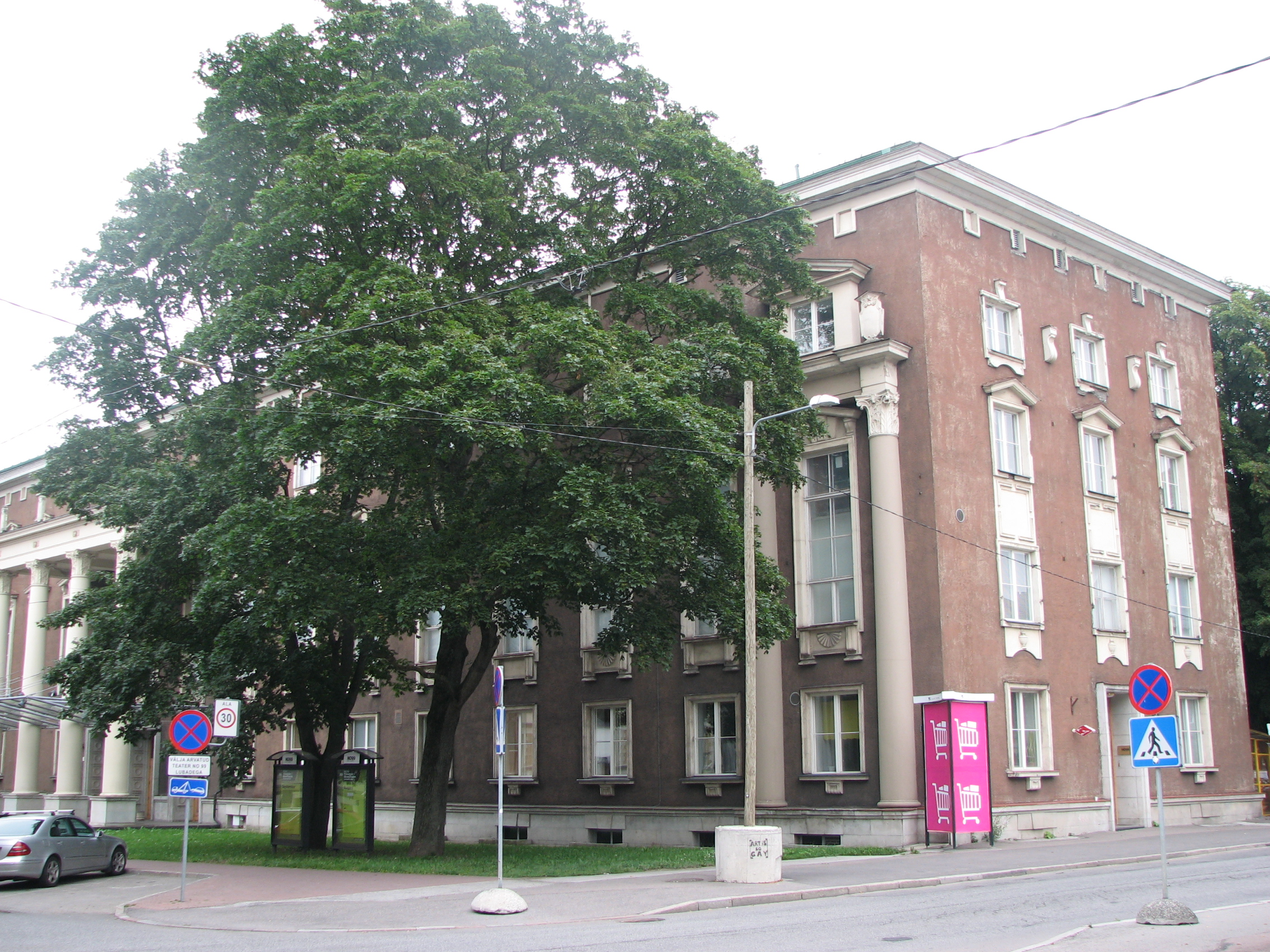
The building of NO99 on Sakala street, Tallinn.

Theatre NO99 was a theatre in Tallinn, Estonia that commenced operations in February 2005. It was a state-owned repertoire theatre that had its own building with two theatre halls in central Tallinn. The theatre closed in 2019.

The theatre's name, NO99, is an abbreviation for "number 99", and with each production the number, 99, decreased by one. Despite the name, the theatre has no connection with classical Noh Theatre.

== Description ==
The theatre’s artistic director was Tiit Ojasoo, and the chief stage designer-director was Ene-Liis Semper. The troupe consisted of 10 actors, eight men, and two women. Every season, the theatre produced two to four new stage productions for the large hall. In addition, co-production projects (for example, with the theatre school) premiered in the small hall. Drama productions were staged primarily in the large hall. They aspired towards artistic exactingness and social relevance. Texts were often composed by the directors themselves (or in cooperation with actors). Adaptations of film screenplays have been produced on several occasions. In some cases, finished drama texts have also been brought to the stage. Works from McDonagh, Kurosawa, Tarkovski, Jarry, Mishima, Chekhov, Shakespeare, and others have been performed by the troupe.

In addition to productions in the large and small halls, plays have been staged in the open air as well: in an old swimming pool (Seven Samurais), and in three abandoned airplane hangars (King Ubu). The theatre also organized so-called one-time "actions", in which the success or failure of an unconventional idea is tested. In addition to Ojasoo and Semper, other Estonian directors also directed plays in the theatre, as do guests from abroad (for example, Sebastian Hartmann, Aleksander Pepeljajev). Guest actors from other theatres also participated in NO99 productions.

== Awards ==
The theatre won several national and international festival awards for productions, stage design, and acting. Several productions have been invited to participate in international festivals in Austria (Wiener Festwochen), Germany, Switzerland, Poland, Russia, Finland, Lithuania, and other countries.

The theatre has also issued several publications as an extension of its activities.

== Europe Theatre Prize ==
In 2017, Theatre NO99 was awarded the XIV Europe Prize Theatrical Realities, in Rome, with the following motivation:

Since 2005, Theatre NO99 has become an essential reference in Estonian theatre and more widely in the cutural [sic] and artistic life of the city of Tallinn. A fixed company of ten actors under the direction of Tiit Ojasoo and Ene-Liis Semper alternate in their playing space with jazz concerts and musical events of international repute. There is also an excellent restaurant. But Theatre NO99 is anything but a simple playing space. On the contrary, it is a centre of theatrical experiment that has thrived on continuing challenges, in search of the furthest limits of the art of theatre, even leading to a breaking point where the artists and technicians working on their shows could abandon the field, after exhausting fights in the core of the group, to succeed in giving value to their respective views. In this way Theatre NO99 has shown how theatre can only be reborn by putting itself radically in question, in order to begin life again with a fiery enthusiasm demanding serious attention, especially from some European countries with a more lukewarm theatrical point of view.

== See also ==
- Vanalinnastuudio

== Literature ==
- Hedi-Liis Toome (2022). "The Rise and Fall of Theatre NO99 in Estonia: A Case of Political and Discursive Change". Nordic Theatre Studies. 34 (1): 66–77. doi:10.7146/NTS.V34I1.137925. ISSN 2002-3898. Wikidata Q119789675.
