= Estonian Drama Theatre =

Theatre in Tallinn

- Eesti Draamateater
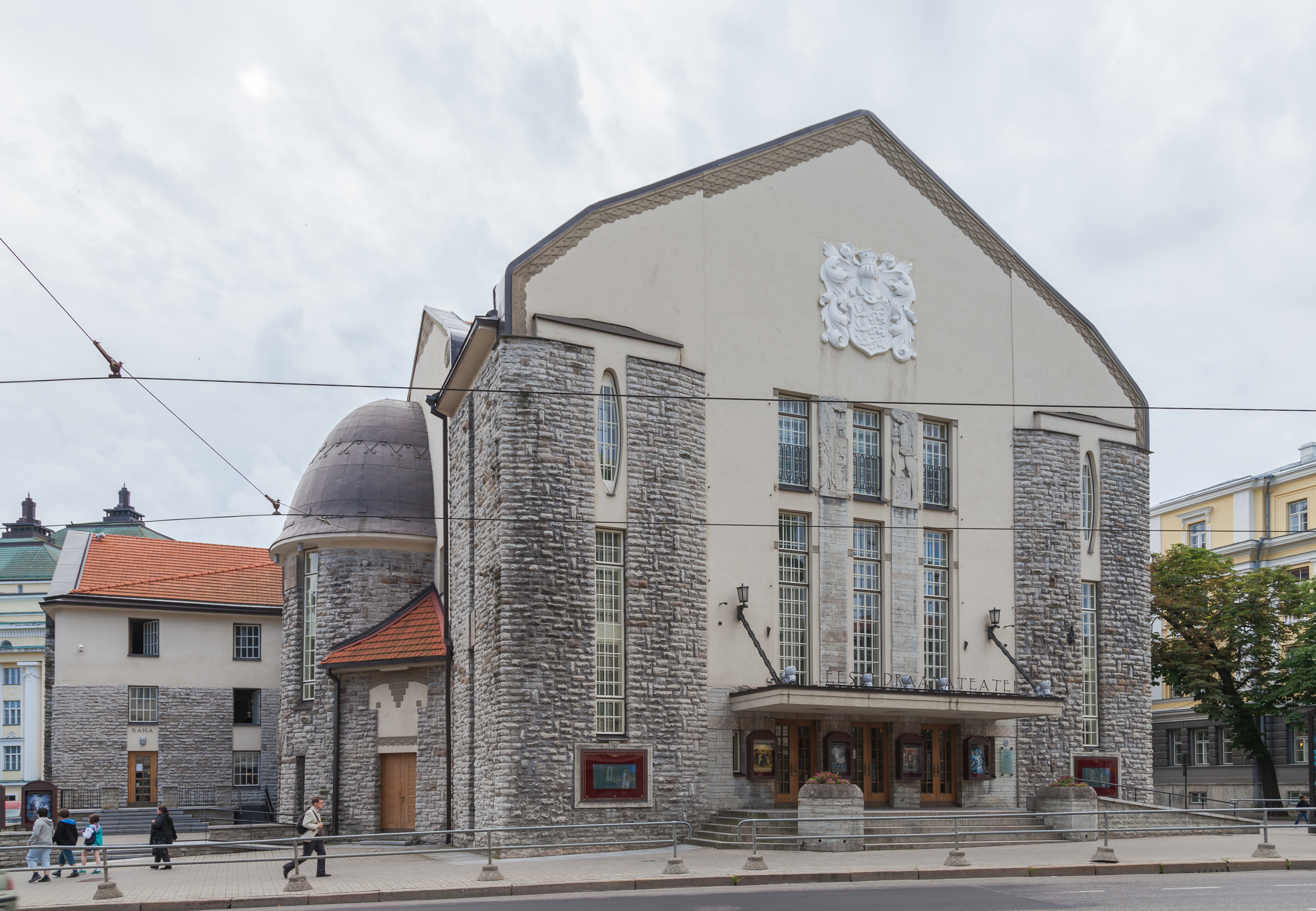
- Front facade of the Estonian Drama Theatre.
- Interactive map of Estonian Drama Theatre
- Address: Pärnu mnt 5, 10143 Tallinn, Estonia
- Location: Tallinn, Estonia
- Coordinates: 59°26′05″N 24°44′56″E

The Estonian Drama Theatre (Estonian: Eesti Draamateater) is a theatre in Tallinn, Estonia. It is a repertory theatre located in a historic building in the heart of Tallinn. Established in 1920, it is renowned for its diverse repertoire, which primarily features drama productions based on both original Estonian works and world dramaturgy. In public discourse, it has frequently been referred to as Estonia’s unofficial national drama theatre. The theatre's general manager has been Rein Oja since 2006 and since 2018 the artistic director has been Hendrik Toompere jr (formerly Toompere jr jr).

The Estonian Drama Theatre boasts a permanent troupe of over 30 actors. Each season, its repertoire features more than 20 productions, with 10–12 new premieres introduced annually. Alongside the permanent ensemble, the theatre collaborates with guest actors and directors, as well as other theatres and cultural institutions. Annually, the theatre stages over 500 performances, attracting an audience of more than 100,000 visitors.

Since 2003, the Estonian Drama Theatre has operated as a state-founded foundation and therefore is partly state-subsidied.

== History ==
The building that houses the Estonian Drama Theatre was originally built for the German theatre of Tallinn and completed in 1910 to designs by Saint Petersburg architects Nikolai Vassilyev and Alexey Bubyr. The style is Art Nouveau or, more specifically, National Romantic. The theatre house is the oldest in Estonia as many older theatre houses were destroyed during the World War II.

An Estonian-language theatre studio was set up in Tallinn in 1920 by director and theatre pedagogue Paul Sepp. On October 11, 1920, the studio's first students convened, marking the beginning of what would later evolve into the Estonian Drama Studio School of Theatre Arts. 11 October 1920 is recognised as the theatre’s founding date. By 1924, the first class of the Drama Studio graduated and decided to establish the Drama Studio Theatre. The founding members of the theatre included Otto Aloe, Rudolf Engelberg, Leo Kalmet, Richard Kuljus, Felix Moor, Leida Mõttus, Johannes Kaljola, Alexis Ormusson, Kaarli Aluoja, Priit Põldroos, Adele Roman, Lydia Seller, Juta Tikandt, Aili Engelberg, Hilda Vernik, and Ly Lasner. The Drama Studio Theatre rented the stage of the German theatre, but performed in other locations as well.

The 1928–1929 season was a challenging period for the Drama Studio Theatre, both economically and artistically. To address its financial struggles, the Drama Studio Theatre undertook extensive touring across Estonia. While one troupe performed in Tallinn, one or two others were almost always on the road. These tours were an essential part of the theatre's survival strategy during this difficult period.

The production of Hugo Raudsepp's comedy Mikumärdi in 1929, directed by Ruut Tarmo, proved to be a turning point for the Drama Studio Theatre. The production was met with great enthusiasm by audiences and became one of the first productions in Estonian theatre history to be performed over 100 times. Following this success, Estonian original works became a cornerstone of the theatre's repertoire. In addition to Raudsepp, prominent writers such as Henrik Visnapuu, Mait Metsanurk, Jaan Kärner, and August Mälk contributed plays to the theatre.

In 1932, the Drama Studio Theatre premiered the first adaptation for the stage of A. H. Tammsaare’s Truth and Justice. With Tammsaare's guidance, Andres Särev adapted the first part of the novel (1926), which was performed under the title Vargamäe.

In 1937, the Drama Studio Theatre was renamed the Estonian Drama Theatre. Its growth was evident in audience numbers and performance volume. While the 1925–1926 season featured 39 performances of 12 productions for 10,100 spectators, by the 1937–1938 season, the theatre staged 366 performances of 9 productions, attracting a remarkable 112,600 spectators.

In March 1939, the theatre building was purchased from the German Theatre Association with financial assistance from the state and Krediidipank and the theatre has been housed there ever since. The first performance in the newly acquired theatre took place on September 16, 1939. Directed by Ruut Tarmo, the production was A. H. Tammsaare's play Judith. The production featured set design by Päären Raudvee and costumes by Natalie Mei. The lead roles were performed by Ly Lasner as Judith and Ruut Tarmo as Olovernes.

In the 1940s, Estonia’s theatres were nationalised. After World War II, frequent leadership changes on ideological grounds and a series of mergers reshaped the sector. During the 1940s and early 1950s, the Estonian Drama Theatre’s company was strengthened by experienced actors such as Linda Tubin and Katrin Välbe, alongside newly trained graduates including Ellen Liiger, Voldemar Panso, Eino Baskin, Jüri Järvet, Inna Taarna and Linda Rummo. In 1949, the Estonia Theatre was reorganised as a music theatre, and its sizeable drama troupe—among them Hugo Laur, Kaarel Karm, Ants Eskola and Aino Talvi—was merged into the Estonian Drama Theatre.

During the Soviet occupation the theatre was called the Viktor Kingissepp Tallinn National Drama Theatre but it reverted to its old name in 1989, prior to Estonia's re-gained independence.

== Theatre ==
The theatre today fulfills the role of an Estonian national theatre. It has three stages, with 436, 170 and 70 seats each. Both classical plays and new productions, including experimental plays, are staged at the theatre. Since it was founded, the Estonian Drama Theatre has cooperated with and staged plays by playwrights such as Hugo Raudsepp, August Kitzberg, Eduard Vilde, A. H. Tammsaare, Mats Traat, Jaan Kross and Oskar Luts. During the 1980s, the theatre took on a political role as it staged plays with themes critical to the Soviet occupation and in favour of Estonian independence by writers like Jaan Kruusvall and Rein Saluri.
