= Henrik Kalmet =

Estonian actor and comedian

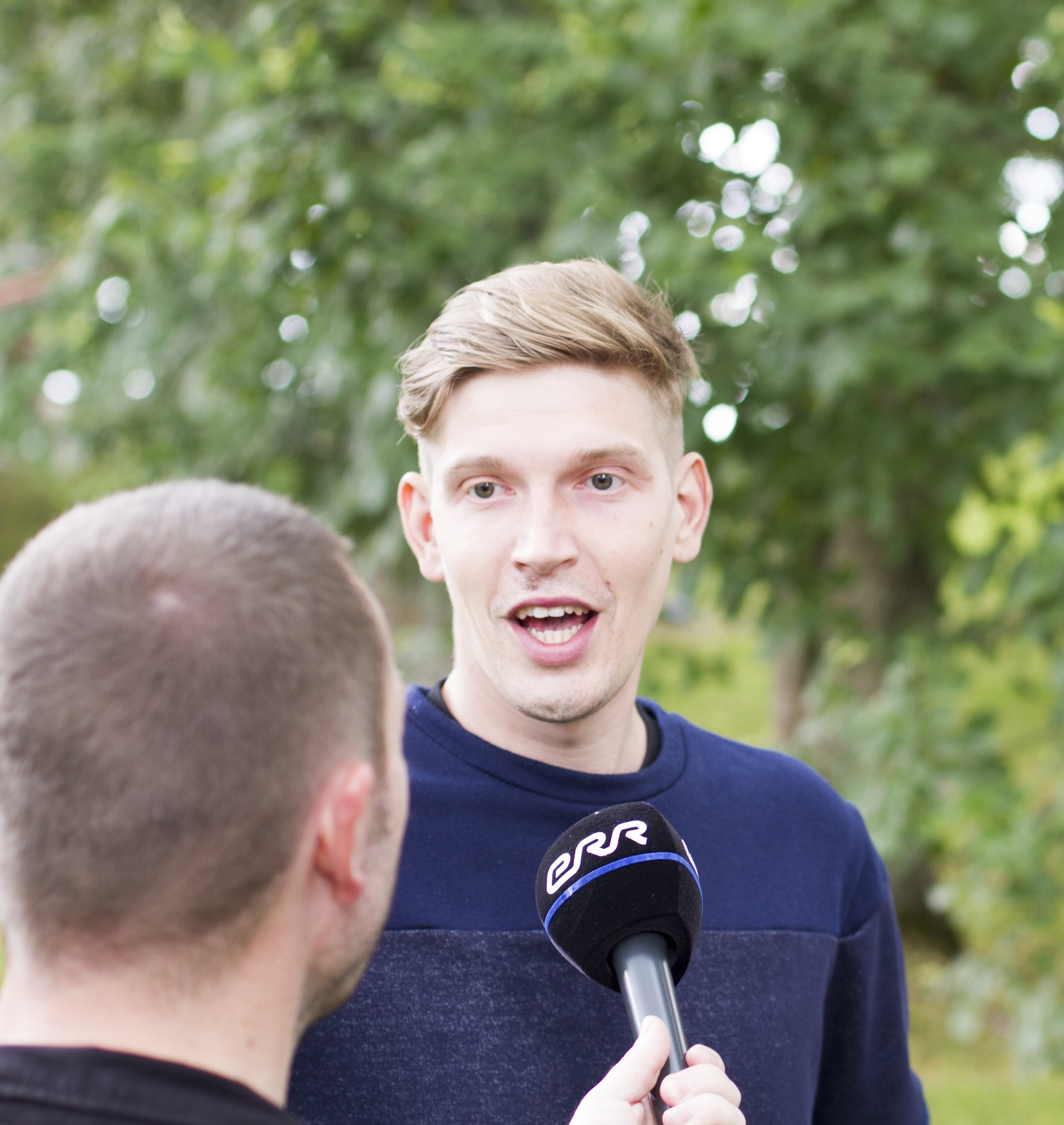
- Kalmet interviewed by Eesti Rahvusringhääling (ERR) at Arvamusfestival in 2014
- Born: 19 April 1986 (age 40); Tallinn, then part of Estonian SSR, Soviet Union
- Occupations: Actor, comedian
- Years active: 2010–present
- Parent(s): Madis Kalmet (father); Gita Ränk (mother)
- Relatives: Karl-Andreas Kalmet (brother)

Henrik Kalmet (born 19 April 1986) is an Estonian actor, comedian, and television personality. Kalmet began his career in 2010 and has appeared as an actor on stage, television, and films. He is also a stand-up comedian and has appeared as a judge and presenter on several Estonian television series. In 2011, he was a cofounder of the theatre troupe Kinoteater.

== Early life and education ==
Henrik Kalmet was born in Tallinn to actor and director Madis Kalmet and former actress and diplomat Gita Kalmet (née Ränk). His younger brother is actor Karl-Andreas Kalmet. Because of his mother's position with the Ministry of Foreign Affairs, he spent part of his youth in the Netherlands and France and attended the Lycée La Fontaine in Paris.

Kalmet graduated from secondary school at the Gustav Adolf Gymnasium in Tallinn in 2005. from 2005 until 2008, he studied philosophy at the University of Tartu before enrolling in the drama department of the Estonian Academy of Music and Theatre to study acting under course supervisor Elmo Nüganen, graduating in 2012. Among his graduating classmates were actors Piret Krumm, Priit Pius, Märt Pius, Pääru Oja, Liis Lass, Maiken Schmidt, Kaspar Velberg, and his brother Karl-Andreas.

== Career ==
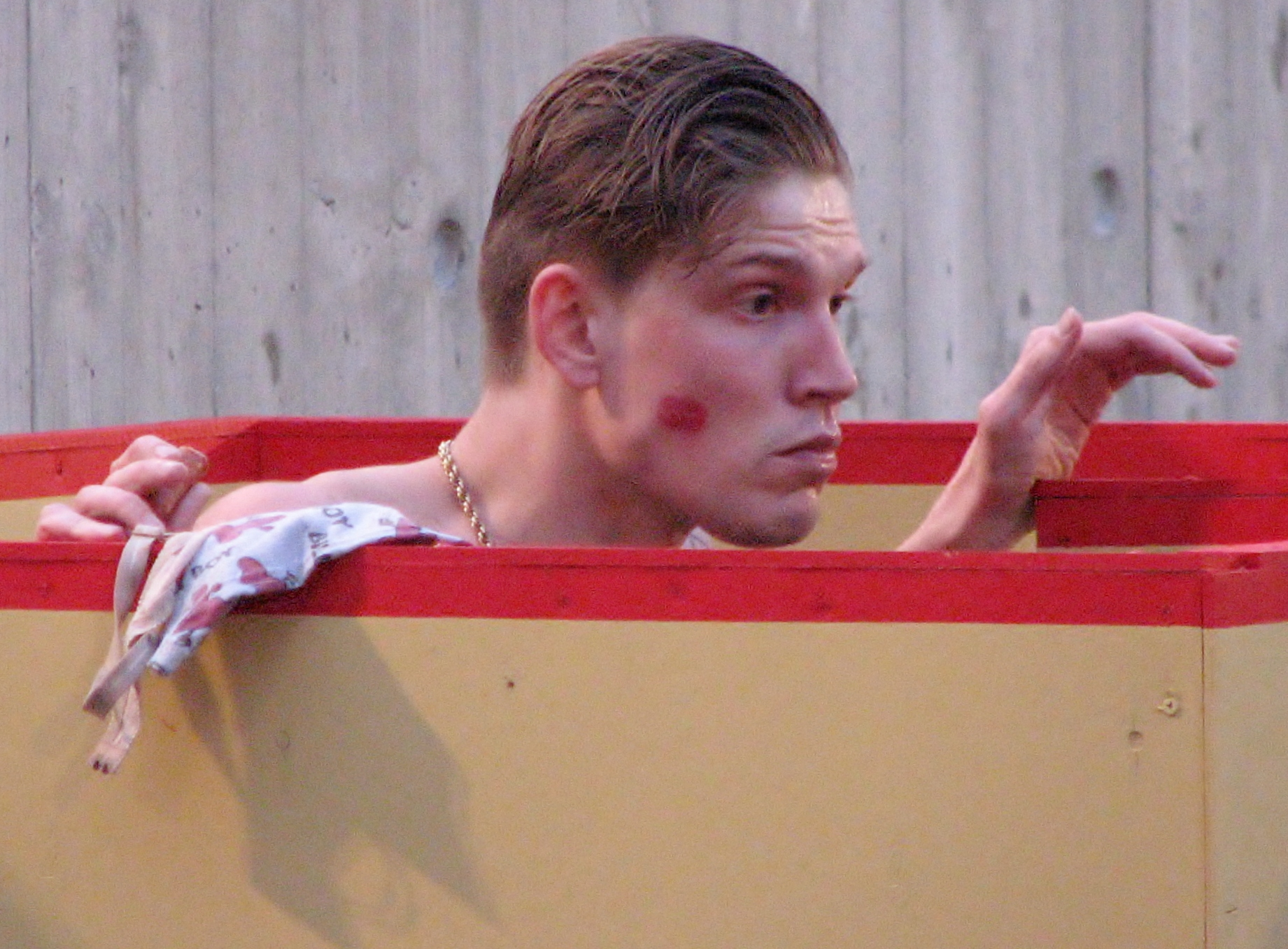
Kalmet at the season opening of the Tallinn City Theatre on 30 August 2012

In 2012, shortly after graduation from the Estonian Academy of Music and Theatre, Kalmet began a theatre engagement as an actor at the Tallinn City Theatre. Among his more notable roles were in productions of works by: A. H. Tammsaare, Peter Barnes, Aleksis Kivi, Neil Simon, Molière, Tom Stoppard, William Shakespeare, Ferenc Molnár, John Steinbeck, and Otfried Preußler. Kalmet left the Tallinn City Theatre in 2017 after publicly criticising the theatre for not being experimental enough. Cultural critic Meelis Oidsalu reported that Kalmet was fired from the theatre. Kalmet disputed Oidsalu's claim and stated that he resigned his position.

In 2011, while still a student at the Estonian Academy of Music and Theatre, Kalmet, along with classmates Paavo Piik, Diana Leesalu, and Paul Piik and Alari Rammo, formed the theatre troupe Kinoteater. The group have written and performed stand-up comedy and produced both entertainment and educational productions, as well as experimental theatre.

Kalmet's first film roles was as the character Jobu in the 2011 short film Kõks, directed by Hardi Keerutaja and featuring Mari Abel, Salme Poopuu, Katariina Ratasepp, and Ann Mari Abel. The following year, with his brother Karl-Andreas, he was the co-host of season five of the TV3 reality-competition gameshow Eesti otsib superstaari. In 2013, he had a small role on the Eesti Rahvusringhääling (ERR) satirical political drama Riigimehed. In 2013, he starred as Henrik in the Moonika Siimets directed comedy short Roosa kampsun.

In 2014, with television presenters Marko Reikop and Helen Sürje, Kalmet co-hosted the semi-finals and finals for the Eesti Laul broadcast on Eesti Televisioon (ETV); the competition to decide who will represent Estonia at the Eurovision Song Contest. In 2015, Kalmet and Reikop hosted the finals of the Eesti Laul broadcast.

Kalmet's first significant feature film role was as Esko in the 2014 Mihkel Ulk directed drama Nullpunkt, starring Estonian Academy of Music and Theatre classmate Märt Pius and Saara Pius. The following year, he reprised his role for the Eesti Televisioon (ETV) follow-up series of the same name. Also in 2015, he appeared in the role of Voldemar Piir in the Elmo Nüganen directed historical war drama 1944. In 2016, he appeared as Lauri in the Anu Aun directed drama Polaarpoiss. The following year, he appeared with his brother Karl-Andreas in the period comedy film Sangarid. The same year, he had a small role in the Priit Pääsuke directed comedy-drama Keti lõpp.

In February 2016, Kalmet appeared fully nude onstage in his monodrama Meeleheitlik katse pälvida festivalikutse at the Kanuti Guild Hall in Tallinn, and again in a photograph taken by Krõõt Tarkmeel in the March 2016 edition of the magazine Anne ja Stiil. Kalmet claimed his decision to appear nude was, in part, to destigmatise nudity, particularly male nudity.

In 2018, Kalmet had his first starring role in a feature film as Tõnu in the Rain Rannu directed comedy Ükssarvik, opposite actress Liisa Pulk. The following year, he appeared in the small role as a medic in his first foreign-language film, the Christopher Nolan directed American/British science fiction action feature Tenet. In 2020, he had a starring role as Edvin in the Kaupo Kruusiauk directed psychological drama Sandra saab tööd, costarring Mari Abel.

In addition to acting, Kalmet performs as a stand-up comedian at various venues throughout Estonia, often performing to raise money for charity.

== Personal life ==
Henrik Kalmet resides in Tallinn. He describes his brother Karl-Andreas as his best friend.

Following the 2022 Russian invasion of Ukraine, in March 2022, he took part in a video panel discussion chaired by European Parliament member Marina Kaljurand on "the impact of Russian aggression on journalism and Estonian-Russian educational and cultural relations". The panel also included University of Tartu President of Student Body Katariina Sofia Päts and journalist Marii Karell.
