= Pääru Oja =

Estonian actor (born 1989)

- Born: 16 May 1989 (age 37); Tallinn, then part of Estonian SSR, Soviet Union
- Occupation: Actor
- Years active: 2010 – present
- Parent: Tõnu Oja (father)
- Relatives: Rein Oja (uncle)

Pääru Oja (born 16 May 1989) is an Estonian stage, film, voice, and television actor.

== Early life and education ==
Pääru Oja was born in Tallinn, the youngest of two sons. His father is actor Tõnu Oja and his older brother is Estonian Theatre Festival CEO and theatre manager Kaarel Oja, who is married to actress Ursula Ratasepp. His uncle is actor, director and theatre instructor Rein Oja. He attended primary and secondary schools in Tallinn before being accepted to the Estonian Academy of Music and Theatre in Tallinn, where he graduated from in 2012 under course supervisor Elmo Nüganen. Oja's diploma roles included Father of Toulon in Peter Barnes' Red Noses (2010), Joseph Wykowski in Neil Simon's Biloxi Blues, and Argante in Molière's The Imaginary Invalid (2011). Among his graduating classmates were: Henrik Kalmet, Karl-Andreas Kalmet, Priit Pius, Märt Pius, Liis Lass, Piret Krumm, Maiken Schmidt, and Kaspar Velberg.

== Career ==
=== Stage ===
Following his graduation from the Estonian Academy of Music and Theatre, Pääru Oja began an engagement at the Estonian Drama Theatre in Tallinn, where he is still currently employed. Some of Oja's more memorable roles at the Estonian Drama Theatre to date have been:

- Juhani, in Aleksis Kivi's Seven Brothers (2012)
- Dennis Dutton, in David Hare's The Vertical Hour (2012)
- T. Stedman Harder, in Eugene O'Neill's A Moon for the Misbegotten (2012)
- Silbe, in Andrus Kivirähk's Kevadine Luts (2012)
- Philip, in Lyle Kessler's Orphans (2013)
- Willem, in Tõnu Õnnepalu's Vennas (2014)
- Billy, in Nina Raine's Tribes (2014)
- Olav, in Mika Keränen's Kuldne Lurich (2014)
- Alyosha Karamazov, in Fyodor Dostoyevsky's The Brothers Karamazov (2015)
- Young Actor, in Michel Houellebecq's The Map and the Territory (2015)
- Boy, in Tõnu Õnnepalu's Mäed (2016)
- Nikolai Ivanov, in Anton Chekhov's Ivanov (2017)
- Piiri Leo, in Madis Kõiv and Aivo Lõhmus' Põud ja vihm Põlva kihelkonnan nelätõistkümnendämä aasta suvõl (2019)

Oja has also appeared performed as Franz in Jaan Kruusvall's Tasandikkude helinad at the Saueaugu Theatre in Ohtla in 2011, and as Alexander Herzen in Tom Stoppard's The Coast of Utopia at the Tallinn City Theatre in 2013.

=== Film ===
Pääru Oja's first film appearance was in the role of Kristjan in the 2010 short Ei oska filmi teha, directed by Hardi Keerutaja and featuring Mikk Jürjens and Viire Valdma. Over the next few years, he appeared in a number of other film shorts. In 2013, he made his feature-length film debut in the small role of Evaristus in the René Vilbre directed children's fantasy film Väikelinna detektiivid ja valge daami saladus.

In 2015, Oja appeared as Sanitar Elmar 'Säinas' in the Elmo Nüganen directed war film 1944 for Matila Röhr Productions (MRP) and Taska Film. Set in World War II, the film is shown through the eyes of Estonian soldiers who had to choose sides and thus fight against their fellow countrymen. It was selected as the Estonian entry for the Best Foreign Language Film at the 88th Academy Awards but it was not nominated. The following year, he appeared as Siim in the Toomas Hussar directed political thriller Luuraja ja luuletaja, starring Jan Uuspõld. In 2017, it was announced he would appear in the Kaur Kokk directed period drama Põrgu Jaan. In 2018, he appeared as the title character in the Ari Alexander Ergis Magnússon directed Icelandic-Estonian drama Mihkel opposite Tómas Lemarquis and as the character Ott in the Siim Tamm directed drama-thriller Hölma All.

In 2020, Oja had a starring role as Rupi in the Veiko Õunpuu directed joint Estonian-Finnish comedy crime-drama Viimased, shot on location in Lapland. The film was selected as the Estonian entry for the Best International Feature Film at the 93rd Academy Awards. The same year, he appeared in the role of Peeter Parik in the Margus Paju directed World War II spy film O2. He also appeared in the film Goodbye Soviet Union.

In 2023, he appeared as Ivo in the Ergo Kuld directed comedy film Suvitajad.

In 2024, he appeared in a starring role as a fictionalized version of poet Juhan Liiv in the Jaak Kilmi directed and Indrek Hargla penned period crime drama feature film Vari.

Oja has also worked as a voice actor, dubbing foreign animated films into the Estonian language. In 2013, he lent his voice to the Estonian dubbing of the animated science fiction-comedy film Escape from Planet Earth (Estonian: Põgenemine planeedilt Maa).

=== Television ===
Between 2014 and 2015, Pääru Oja had a recurring role as Markus Heng on the popular TV3 comedy-crime series Kättemaksukontor. In 2018, he began a starring role as Alex in the TV3 crime series Lõks. In 2020, he had a recurring role as David in the Finnish television crime series Cold Courage.

In 2021, Oja was cast as the character Arne Gormsson in the Netflix historical action-fiction drama television series Vikings: Valhalla.

=== Radio ===
In 2016, Pääru Oja was one of 77 Estonian actors to honor the 400th year of William Shakespeare's death with the radio series "154 Sonnets of William Shakespeare" on Estonian Public Broadcasting stations Vikerraadio, Klassikaraadio, and Raadio 2. All sonnets were translated into the Estonian language by Harald Rajamets and each actor recited a sonnet daily.

== Personal life ==
Pääru Oja currently resides in Tallinn. He is a jazz and flamenco guitarist and often performs sets with fellow guitarist Indrek Kruusimaa at venues in Estonia.

== Recognition ==
- Shooting Stars Award (2020)
- Suur Ants, Estonian Drama Theater Colleague Award for Best Actor (2015)
- Crystal Shoe Award (2014)

== Filmography ==
=== Film ===
- Ei oska filmi teha (2010) as Kristjan – Short film directed by Hardi Keerutaja.
- Väikelinna detektiivid ja valge daami saladus (2013) as Evaristus – Directed by René Vilbre.
- 1944 (2015) as Sanitar Elmar 'Säinas' – Directed by Elmo Nüganen.
- Luuraja ja luuletaja (2016) as Siim – Directed by Toomas Hussar.
- Põrgu Jaan (2017) – Directed by Kaur Kokk.
- Mihkel (2018) as Mihkel – Directed by Ari Alexander Ergis Magnússon.
- Hölma All (2018) as Ott – Directed by Siim Tamm.
- The Last Ones (2020) as Rupi – Directed by Veiko Õunpuu.
- O2 (2020) as Peeter Parik – Directed by Margus Paju.
- Goodbye Soviet Union (2020) as Uncle Kolja – Directed by Lauri Randla.
- Suvitajad (2023) as Ivo – Directed by Ergo Kuld.
- Vari (2024) as Juhan Liiv – Directed by Jaak Kilmi.
- Säärane mulk (2026) as Peeter – Directed by Ergo Kuld.
- Our Erika (2026) as Jaanus Kuum – Directed by German Golub

=== Television ===
- Kättemaksukontor (2014–2015) as Markus Heng – Recurring role on the TV3 comedy-crime series.
- Lõks (2018) as Alex – Starring role in the TV3 crime series.
- Cold Courage (2020) as David – Recurring role in the Finnish television crime series.
- Vikings: Valhalla (2021) as Arne Gormsson – Historical action-fiction drama on Netflix.
