= 1989 in film =

The year 1989 involved many significant films.

== Highest-grossing films ==
The top 10 films released in 1989 by worldwide gross are as follows:

Highest-grossing films of 1989
Rank	Title	Distributor	Worldwide gross
1	Indiana Jones and the Last Crusade	Paramount	$474,171,806
2	Batman	Warner Bros.	$411,569,241
3	Back to the Future Part II	Universal	$332,950,002
4	Look Who's Talking	Tri-Star	$297,999,813
5	Dead Poets Society	Buena Vista	$235,860,116
6	Lethal Weapon 2	Warner Bros.	$227,853,986
7	Honey, I Shrunk the Kids	Buena Vista	$222,724,172
8	Ghostbusters II	Columbia	$215,394,738
9	The Little Mermaid	Buena Vista	$184,155,863
10	Born on the Fourth of July	Universal	$162,001,698

== Events ==
- Actress Kim Basinger and her brother Mick purchase Braselton, Georgia, for $20 million. Basinger would lose the town to her partner in the deal, the pension fund of Chicago-based Ameritech Corp., in 1993 after being forced to file for bankruptcy when a California judge ordered her to pay $7.4 million for refusing to honor a verbal contract to star in the film Boxing Helena.
- A director's cut of Lawrence of Arabia is released with a 227-minute length. The restoration was undertaken by Robert A. Harris under the supervision of director David Lean.
- March 31 - Australian Christopher Skase's firm Qintex announces an agreement to buy United Artists from MGM/UA Communications for $600 million.
- May 24 – Indiana Jones and the Last Crusade is released by Paramount Pictures. It is the third installment of the Indiana Jones franchise.
- June 13 – The James Bond film Licence to Kill is released. It would be followed by years of legal wrangling over the future of the popular series. The next Bond film, GoldenEye, will be released in 1995.
- June 23
  - Batman is released by Warner Bros., earning more than $410 million worldwide. It established the public and critical attention of director Tim Burton.
  - Honey, I Shrunk the Kids is released by Walt Disney Pictures, marking the directorial debut of visual effects supervisor Joe Johnston, who later went on to direct The Rocketeer, Jumanji, October Sky, Jurassic Park III, and Captain America: The First Avenger.
- July 7 – Lethal Weapon 2 is released by Warner Bros., becoming both the highest-grossing film in the franchise and the highest grossing R-rated film of the year at the domestic box-office.
- July 11 – Screen, stage, and Shakespearian legend Laurence Olivier died peacefully at his British home, after appearing in his last filmed role as an old soldier in War Requiem.
- August 2 – Ron Howard's family comedy Parenthood, starring Steve Martin, Tom Hulce, and Rick Moranis, is released by Universal Pictures.
- September 28 – Sony announce its intention to buy Columbia Pictures and Tri-Star Pictures. The deal is completed in November for a total cost of nearly $5 billion. They appoint Peter Guber and Jon Peters as co-chairman, in a further deal that cost up to $1 billion, after settling a lawsuit with Warner Bros.
- November 7 – Andrew G. Vajna agrees to sell his stake in Carolco Pictures to his co-chairman and co-founder Mario Kassar for $106 million.
- November 17 – The Little Mermaid becomes a critical and commercial success, bringing new life to Walt Disney Feature Animation. This film also reinvigorated public and critical interest in The Walt Disney Company, which would become one of the most prestigious corporations of the 1990s.
- November 22 – Back to the Future Part II is released by Universal Pictures.

== Awards ==
Category/Organization	47th Golden Globe Awards January 20, 1990		62nd Academy Awards March 26, 1990	43rd BAFTA Awards 1990
Category/Organization	Drama	Comedy or Musical	62nd Academy Awards March 26, 1990	43rd BAFTA Awards 1990
Best Film	Born on the Fourth of July	Driving Miss Daisy		Dead Poets Society
Best Director	Oliver Stone; Born on the Fourth of July			Kenneth Branagh; Henry V
Best Actor	Tom Cruise; Born on the Fourth of July	Morgan Freeman; Driving Miss Daisy	Daniel Day-Lewis; My Left Foot	
Best Actress	Michelle Pfeiffer; The Fabulous Baker Boys	Jessica Tandy; Driving Miss Daisy		Pauline Collins; Shirley Valentine
Best Supporting Actor	Denzel Washington; Glory			Ray McAnally; My Left Foot
Best Supporting Actress	Julia Roberts; Steel Magnolias		Brenda Fricker; My Left Foot	Michelle Pfeiffer; Dangerous Liaisons
Best Screenplay, Adapted	Ron Kovic and Oliver Stone; Born on the Fourth of July		Alfred Uhry; Driving Miss Daisy	Christopher Hampton; Dangerous Liaisons
Best Screenplay, Original	Ron Kovic and Oliver Stone; Born on the Fourth of July		Tom Schulman; Dead Poets Society	Nora Ephron; When Harry Met Sally...
Best Original Score	The Little Mermaid; Alan Menken			Dead Poets Society; Maurice Jarre
Best Original Song	"Under the Sea"; The Little Mermaid			N/A
Best Foreign Language Film	Cinema Paradiso			Life and Nothing But

Palme d'Or (Cannes Film Festival)

Sex, Lies, and Videotape, directed by Steven Soderbergh, United States

Golden Lion (Venice Film Festival)

A City of Sadness (Bēiqíng chéngshì), directed by Hou Hsiao-hsien, Taiwan

Golden Bear (Berlin International Film Festival)

Rain Man, directed by Barry Levinson, United States

People's Choice Award (Toronto International Film Festival):

Roger & Me, directed by Michael Moore, United States

== 1989 films ==
=== By country/region ===
- List of American films of 1989
- List of Argentine films of 1989
- List of Australian films of 1989
- List of Bangladeshi films of 1989
- List of British films of 1989
- List of Canadian films of 1989
- List of French films of 1989
- List of Hong Kong films of 1989
- List of Japanese films of 1989
- List of Mexican films of 1989
- List of South Korean films of 1989
- List of Soviet films of 1989
- List of Spanish films of 1989

=== By genre/medium ===
- List of action films of 1989
- List of animated feature films of 1989
- List of avant-garde films of 1989
- List of comedy films of 1989
- List of drama films of 1989
- List of horror films of 1989
- List of science fiction films of 1989
- List of thriller films of 1989
- List of western films of 1989

== Births ==
- January 1 – Zoe Boyle, British actress
- January 3 – Alex D. Linz, American actor
- January 6 - Max Pirkis, English actor
- January 8 – Karan Soni, Indian-American actor
- January 9 – Nina Dobrev, Bulgarian-Canadian actress and model
- January 10 - Emily Meade, American actress
- January 13 – Andy Allo, Cameroonian-American singer-songwriter and actress
- January 14 – Emma Greenwell, American-born English actress
- January 15 - Ryan Corr, Australian actor
- January 16
  - Rila Fukushima, Japanese actress and model
  - Yvonne Zima, American actress
- January 17 – Kelly Marie Tran, American actress
- January 20
  - Krys Marshall, American actress
  - Nic Westaway, Australian actor and singer
- January 23 – April Pearson, English actress
- January 20 – Piret Krumm, Estonian actress
- January 26 – Hannah Arterton, American actress
- January 29 – Kaspar Velberg, Estonian actor
- January 30
  - Kylie Bunbury, Canadian-American actress
  - Khleo Thomas, American actor
- February 1 – Marco Pigossi, Brazilian actor
- February 2 - Alex Sharp, English actor
- February 3 – Ryne Sanborn, American former actor
- February 4
  - Märt Pius, Estonian actor
  - Priit Pius, Estonian actor
- February 5 – Jeremy Sumpter, American actor
- February 10 – Olga Korsak, Latvian actress
- February 11 - Adele Haenel, French actress
- February 12
  - Odelya Halevi, Israeli actress
  - Katy O'Brian, American actress
- February 13
  - Carly McKillip, Canadian actress and singer
  - Katie Volding, American actress
- February 16 – Elizabeth Olsen, American actress
- February 19 - Griffin Newman, American actor and comedian
- February 21
  - Corbin Bleu, American actor and singer
  - Scout Taylor-Compton, American actress and singer
- February 24 – Daniel Kaluuya, English actor
- February 28
  - Aaron Moten, American actor
  - Angelababy, Hong Kong actress and singer
- March 1 – Daniella Monet, American actress and singer
- March 2 – Nathalie Emmanuel, English actress and model
- March 3 – Andrea Brooks, Canadian actress and model
- March 5
  - Jake Lloyd, American actor
  - Sterling Knight, American actor and musician
- March 11
  - Rainey Qualley, American actress and singer
  - Anton Yelchin, Russian-American actor (died 2016)
- March 15
  - Tom Bateman, British actor
  - Caitlin Wachs, American actress
- March 17
  - Morfydd Clark, Welsh actress
  - Harry Melling, English actor
- March 18 – Lily Collins, English-American actress
- March 20 – Xavier Dolan, Canadian actor and director
- March 21 – Takeru Sato, Japanese actor
- March 23 – Ayesha Curry, Canadian-American actress
- March 25
  - Matthew Beard, English actor and model
  - Aly Michalka, American actress and singer
- April 2 – Liis Lass, Estonian actress
- April 5
  - Freddie Fox, English actor, director and voice artist
  - Lily James, English actress
- April 8 – Gabriella Wilde, English model and actress
- April 9 – Inga Ibsdotter Lilleaas, Norwegian actress
- April 12 – Yoshi Sudarso, Indonesian-born American actor
- April 17 - Beau Knapp, American actor
- April 18 – Alia Shawkat, American actress
- April 19 – Simu Liu, Canadian actor, writer, producer and stuntman
- April 26 – Luke Bracey, Australian actor
- April 29
  - Sophie Charlotte, Brazilian actress
  - Gabriel Chavarria, American-Hispanic actor
- April 30 - Alex Hafner, international actor
- May 5 – Larissa Wilson, English actress
- May 10 – Lindsey Shaw, American actress
- May 12 – Mimi Gianopulos, American actress
- May 16 – Pääru Oja, Estonian actor
- May 18 – Jona Xiao, American actress
- May 21 - Emily Robins, New Zealand actress
- May 23 – Alberto Frezza, Italian–American actor
- May 24
  - Tara Correa-McMullen, American actress (died 2005)
  - Brianne Howey, American actress
- May 29
  - Riley Keough, American actress
  - Brandon Mychal Smith, American actor, singer and rapper
  - Mathew Waters, Australian actor
- May 30 – Kevin Covais, American actor and singer-songwriter
- June 3
  - Megumi Han, Japanese voice actress
  - Imogen Poots, English actress
  - Daniela Vega, Chilean actress
- June 5 - Elizabeth Ludlow, American actress
- June 12
  - Jade Anouka, English actress
  - Stephanie Bennett, Canadian actress
- June 13 - Irina Gorovaia, American actress
- June 14
  - Lucy Hale, American actress and singer
  - Courtney Halverson, American actress
  - Tobit Raphael, American actor
  - Ellie White, English actress and comedian
- June 18 – Renee Olstead, American actress and singer
- June 19 – Giacomo Gianniotti, Italian-Canadian actor
- June 20
  - Eve Harlow, Soviet-Canadian actor
  - Christopher Mintz-Plasse, American actor
- June 21 – Jascha Washington, American actor
- June 23 – Marielle Jaffe, American actress, singer and model
- June 24 - Rafi Gavron, British actor
- June 25
  - Edgar Morais, Portuguese actor, director, producer, and screenwriter
  - Rafael Morais, Portuguese actor, director, and screenwriter
- June 26 – Carlos Lopez, American stunt performer (died 2014)
- June 27
  - Kimiko Glenn, American actress
  - Kelley Jakle, American actress and singer-songwriter
  - Matthew Lewis, English actor
- July 1
  - Mitch Hewer, English actor
  - Hannah Murray, English actress
- July 3 – Kento Kaku, Japanese actor
- July 7 - Alice Orr-Ewing, British actress
- July 11
  - David Henrie, American actor
  - Shareeka Epps, American actress
- July 12 – Phoebe Tonkin, Australian actress and model
- July 13 - Leon Bridges, American singer-songwriter and actor
- July 14 – Alisha Wainwright, American actress
- July 16 – Kim Woo-bin, South Korean actor
- July 19 – James Austin Johnson, American comedian and actor
- July 21
  - Rory Culkin, American actor
  - Jasmine Cephas Jones, American actress, singer and producer
  - Juno Temple, English actress
  - Jing Tian, Chinese actress
  - Jamie Waylett, British former actor
- July 23 – Daniel Radcliffe, English actor
- July 25 – Andrew Caldwell, American actor
- July 27 – Charlotte Arnold, Canadian actress
- July 31
  - Alexis Knapp, American actress
  - Sofia Pernas, American actress
  - Jessica Williams, American actress and comedian
  - Zelda Williams, American actress, director, producer and writer
- August 1 – Landry Allbright, American actress, writer and editor
- August 2 – Priscilla Betti, French actress
- August 9 - Paige Spara, American actress
- August 10
  - Marcus Rosner, Canadian actor
  - Brenton Thwaites, Australian actor
- August 14 – Artyom Bogucharsky, Russian actor
- August 15
  - Joe Jonas, American singer and actor (Jonas Brothers)
  - Carlos PenaVega, actor (Big Time Rush)
  - Masaki Okada, Japanese actor
- August 18 – Anna Akana, American filmmaker, actress, comedian, musician and YouTuber
- August 21
  - Rob Knox, English actor (died 2008)
  - Hayden Panettiere, American actress and singer (died 2026)
- August 29 - Charlotte Ritchie, English actress
- September 5
  - Thomas Cocquerel, Australian actor
  - Kat Graham, American actress, model, singer and dancer
  - Olivier Richters, Dutch bodybuilder, actor and model
- September 7
  - Loren Allred, American singer, songwriter and actress
  - Hannah John-Kamen, English actress
  - Jonathan Majors, American actor
  - Hugh Mitchell, English actor
- September 8 – Domee Shi, Canadian filmmaker
- September 14
  - Logan Henderson, actor (Big Time Rush)
  - Jesse James, American actor
- September 17 – Danielle Brooks, American actress and singer
- September 19 – Lorenza Izzo, Chilean actress and model
- September 22 – Sofía Espinosa, Mexican actress, writer and director
- September 26 – Emma Rigby, English actress
- October 1 – Brie Larson, American actress
- October 4 – Dakota Johnson, American actress
- October 10
  - Simeoni Sundja, Estonian actor
  - Aimee Teegarden, American actress, model and producer
- October 14 – Mia Wasikowska, Australian actress
- October 16 - Jack Salvatore Jr., American actor and television writer
- October 18 - Joy Lauren, American producer, director, writer and former actress
- October 24
  - David Castañeda, American actor
  - Shenae Grimes, Canadian actress
- October 30 – Dustin Ybarra, American stand-up comedian and actor
- November 3 – Elliott Tittensor, English actor
- November 8 – Nia DaCosta, American filmmaker
- November 10
  - Sherry Cola, American comedian and actress
  - Taron Egerton, Welsh actor
- November 18 – Stephanie Nogueras, American actress
- November 20
  - Cody Linley, American actor and singer
  - Sergei Polunin, Ukrainian actor and dancer
- November 22 – Alden Ehrenreich, American actor
- November 25 - Patsy Ferran, Spanish-British actress
- November 26 – Katie Sagona, American former child actress
- December 2 – Cassie Steele, Canadian actress and singer
- December 4 – Nafessa Williams, American actress
- December 7
  - Nicholas Hoult, English actor
  - Caleb Landry Jones, American actor and musician
- December 13 – Taylor Swift, American singer-songwriter, actress, and musician
- December 15 – Nichole Sakura, American actress
- December 18 – Ashley Benson, American actress and model
- December 21 - Quinta Brunson, American actress, comedian, writer and producer
- December 24 – Daniel Durant, American actor
- December 28
  - George Blagden, English actor
  - Jessie Buckley, Irish actress and singer
- December 29
  - Jane Levy, American actress
  - Left Brain, American rapper
- December 30 – Letícia Colin, Brazilian actress

== Deaths ==
Month	Date	Name	Age	Country	Profession	Notable films
January	3	Nell O'Day	79	US	Actress	The Road to Ruin; Rackety Rax
January	3	Jean Willes	65	US	Actress	Invasion of the Body Snatchers; The King and Four Queens
January	8	Kenneth McMillan	56	US	Actor	Ragtime; The Pope of Greenwich Village
January	15	Helen Logan	82	US	Screenwriter	Charlie Chan at the Olympics; Pin Up Girl
January	15	Joe Spinell	52	US	Actor	The Godfather; Rocky
January	16	Prem Nazir	62	India	Actor	Murappennu; Dhwani
January	16	Trey Wilson	40	US	Actor	Raising Arizona; Bull Durham
January	19	Norma Varden	90	UK	Actress	Casablanca; The Sound of Music
January	20	Beatrice Lillie	94	Canada	Actress	Thoroughly Modern Millie; Around the World in 80 Days
January	23	Arthur Lonergan	83	US	Art Director	Forbidden Planet; M*A*S*H
January	26	Morton DaCosta	74	US	Director	The Music Man; Auntie Mame
February	2	Walter M. Scott	82	US	Set Decorator	The Sound of Music; Butch Cassidy and the Sundance Kid
February	3	John Cassavetes	59	US	Actor, Director, Screenwriter	The Dirty Dozen; Faces
February	3	Lionel Newman	73	US	Composer	Doctor Dolittle; Hello, Dolly!
February	3	Paul Carson	54	US	Actor	A Countess from Hong Kong; You Only Live Twice
February	4	Ferris Webster	76	US	Film Editor	The Great Escape; The Manchurian Candidate
February	5	Emrys James	60	UK	Actor	Dragonslayer; The Man in the Iron Mask
February	5	Joe Raposo	51	US	Composer, Songwriter	The Possession of Joel Delaney; The Great Muppet Caper
February	11	T. E. B. Clarke	81	UK	Screenwriter	The Lavender Hill Mob; Passport to Pimlico
February	11	Roland Gross	80	US	Film Editor	The Thing from Another World; None but the Lonely Heart
February	11	George O'Hanlon	76	US	Actor	Rocky; Park Row
February	17	Marguerite Roberts	83	US	Screenwriter	True Grit; Ziegfeld Girl
February	22	Roxanne Arlen	58	US	Actress	Gypsy; The Best Things in Life Are Free
February	22	Joan Woodbury	73	US	Actress	Brenda Starr, Reporter; Paper Bullets
March	6	Harry Andrews	77	UK	Actor	The Agony and the Ecstasy; The Hill
March	10	Maurizio Merli	49	Italy	Actor	Violent Rome; Mannaja
March	12	Maurice Evans	87	UK	Actor	Planet of the Apes; Rosemary's Baby
March	17	Merritt Butrick	29	US	Actor	Star Trek II: The Wrath of Khan; Head Office
March	19	Valérie Quennessen	31	France	Actress	Conan the Barbarian; Summer Lovers
March	21	Milton Frome	80	US	Actor	Bye Bye Birdie; The Nutty Professor
March	25	Reginald LeBorg	89	Austria	Director	Jungle Woman; War Drums
March	27	May Allison	98	US	Actress	A Fool There Was; The City
March	27	Jack Starrett	52	US	Actor, Director	Blazing Saddles; Race with the Devil
March	28	Robert J. Wilke	74	US	Actor	High Noon; The Magnificent Seven
March	29	Bernard Blier	73	France	Actor	The Great War; The Organizer
March	30	Reg Allen	71	UK	Set Decorator	The Pink Panther; Lady Sings the Blues
April	8	Mario Chiari	79	Italy	Production Designer	Doctor Dolittle; King Kong
April	12	Gerald Flood	61	UK	Actor	Patton; Frightmare
April	15	Charles Vanel	96	France	Actor, Director	The Wages of Fear; Diabolique
April	16	John Dighton	79	UK	Screenwriter	Roman Holiday; Kind Hearts and Coronets
April	24	Clyde Geronimi	87	US	Animator, Director	One Hundred and One Dalmatians; Cinderella
April	25	George Coulouris	85	UK	Actor	Citizen Kane; Mr. Skeffington
April	26	Lucille Ball	77	US	Actress	Mame; The Big Street
April	28	Jack Cummings	84	US	Producer, Director	Seven Brides for Seven Brothers; Kiss Me Kate
April	30	Sergio Leone	60	Italy	Director, Screenwriter	The Good, the Bad and the Ugly; Once Upon a Time in America
April	30	Guy Williams	65	US	Actor	Damon and Pythias; Captain Sindbad
May	2	James Crabe	57	US	Cinematographer	Rocky; The Karate Kid
May	3	William Squire	71	UK	Actor	Where Eagles Dare; The Lord of the Rings
May	15	Johnny Green	80	US	Composer	West Side Story; An American in Paris
May	19	Anton Diffring	72	Germany	Actor	Circus of Horrors; The Blue Max
May	19	Robert Webber	64	US	Actor	12 Angry Men; 10
May	20	Lyn Murray	79	UK	Composer, Conductor	To Catch a Thief; Wives and Lovers
May	20	Gilda Radner	42	US	Actress	The Woman in Red; Haunted Honeymoon
May	22	Gerd Oswald	69	Germany	Director	Screaming Mimi; A Kiss Before Dying
May	25	Brigid Bazlen	44	US	Actress	How the West Was Won; The Honeymoon Machine
May	26	Albert Woodbury	79	US	Composer, Orchestrator	My Fair Lady; They Shoot Horses, Don't They?
June	10	Richard Quine	68	US	Director	Bell, Book and Candle; Operation Mad Ball
June	15	Victor French	54	US	Actor	An Officer and a Gentleman; Chato's Land
June	15	Ray McAnally	63	Ireland	Actor	The Mission; My Left Foot
June	17	John Matuszak	38	US	Actor	The Goonies; North Dallas Forty
June	20	Dona Drake	74	US	Actress	Road to Morocco; Dangerous Millions
June	27	Jack Buetel	73	US	Actor	The Outlaw; Rose of Cimarron
June	28	Joris Ivens	90	Netherlands	Director, Documentarian	Rain; The Bridge
July	2	Franklin J. Schaffner	79	US	Director	Patton; Planet of the Apes
July	2	Ben Wright	74	UK	Actor	The Sound of Music; One Hundred and One Dalmatians
July	3	Jim Backus	76	US	Actor	Rebel Without a Cause; It's a Mad, Mad, Mad, Mad World
July	10	Mel Blanc	81	US	Voice Actor	Who Framed Roger Rabbit; The Bugs Bunny/Road Runner Movie
July	11	Laurence Olivier	82	UK	Actor, Director	Hamlet; Marathon Man
July	18	Rebecca Schaeffer	21	US	Actress	Radio Days; Scenes from the Class Struggle in Beverly Hills
July	20	Mary Treen	82	US	Actress	Kitty Foyle; It's a Wonderful Life
July	27	Warren Low	83	US	Film Editor	Now, Voyager; True Grit
July	28	Jeff Richards	64	US	Actor	Seven Brides for Seven Brothers; Big Leaguer
August	4	Maurice Colbourne	49	UK	Actor	The Duellists; Venom
August	11	John Meillon	55	Australia	Actor	Crocodile Dundee; Wake in Fright
August	16	Amanda Blake	60	US	Actress	Miss Robin Crusoe; The Boost
August	20	Joseph LaShelle	89	US	Cinematographer	Laura; The Apartment
August	18	Robert Buckner	83	US	Screenwriter	Yankee Doodle Dandy; Love Me Tender
August	30	Joe De Santis	80	US	Actor	Al Capone; The Professionals
August	31	Claire Luce	85	US	Actress	Over She Goes; Up the River
September	10	Gordon McCallum	70	US	Sound Engineer	Fiddler on the Roof; Superman
September	14	John Bright	81	US	Screenwriter	The Public Enemy; Blonde Crazy
September	15	Michael Klinger	68	UK	Producer	Get Carter; Cul-de-sac
September	19	Philip Sayer	42	UK	Actor	Xtro; Slayground
September	21	Ertem Eğilmez	60	Turkey	Producer, Director	Namuslu; Arabesk
September	21	Corrado Gaipa	65	Italy	Actor	The Godfather; The Sicilian Connection
September	22	Irving Berlin	101	US	Composer	Top Hat; Holiday Inn
September	23	Angelo Ross	78	US	Film Editor	Smokey and the Bandit; Who Killed Teddy Bear
October	2	Vittorio Caprioli	68	Italy	Actor, Director	Leoni al sole; Splendori e miserie di Madame Royale
October	4	Graham Chapman	48	UK	Actor, Screenwriter	Monty Python's Life of Brian; Monty Python and the Holy Grail
October	4	Betsy King Ross	68	US	Actress	Smoke Lightning; The Phantom Empire
October	5	Paul Lerpae	89	US	Special Effects Artist	The War of the Worlds; The Ten Commandments
October	5	Noël-Noël	92	France	Actor, Screenwriter	Les Casse Pieds; The French, They Are a Funny Race
October	6	Bette Davis	81	US	Actress	All About Eve; Jezebel
October	8	Onest Conley	82	US	Actor	Grand Old Girl; This Day and Age
October	11	Paul Shenar	53	US	Actor	Scarface; Raw Deal
October	13	Cesare Zavattini	87	Italy	Screenwriter	Bicycle Thieves; Shoeshine
October	14	Michael Carmine	30	US	Actor	Batteries Not Included; Leviathan
October	15	James Lee Barrett	59	US	Screenwriter	The Greatest Story Ever Told; Smokey and the Bandit
October	16	Cornel Wilde	77	US	Actor, Director	The Greatest Show on Earth; A Song to Remember
October	20	Anthony Quayle	76	UK	Actor	The Guns of Navarone; Lawrence of Arabia
October	21	Jean Image	78	Hungary	Director	Johnny the Giant Killer; Aladdin and His Magic Lamp
October	22	Roland Winters	84	US	Actor	The Chinese Ring; Blue Hawaii
October	23	Armida	78	Mexico	Actress, Singer	Machine Gun Mama; The Girl from Monterrey
October	29	Roland Anderson	85	US	Art Director	White Christmas; Breakfast at Tiffany's
October	31	Monica Collingwood	81	US	Film Editor	The Bishop's Wife; The Secret Life of Walter Mitty
November	1	Peter Childs	50	UK	Actor	Sweeney!; Minder on the Orient Express
November	6	Margit Makay	98	Hungary	Actress	Cats' Play; Two Confessions
November	6	Yūsaku Matsuda	40	Japan	Actor	Proof of the Man; The Family Game
November	7	Brunello Rondi	64	Italy	Screenwriter, Director	La Dolce Vita; 8½
November	11	Roger Heman Jr	57	US	Sound Engineer	Jaws; Coal Miner's Daughter
November	17	Billy Lee	60	US	Actor	Wagon Wheels; The Biscuit Eater
November	18	Edvin Laine	84	Finland	Actor	The Unknown Soldier; Sven Tuuva the Hero
November	20	Lynn Bari	75	US	Actress	Shock; The Bridge of San Luis Rey
November	21	Harvey Hart	61	Canada	Director	Bus Riley's Back in Town; The Sweet Ride
December	6	Frances Bavier	86	US	Actress	The Day the Earth Stood Still; The Stooge
December	6	Sammy Fain	87	US	Composer	Love Is a Many-Splendored Thing; Peter Pan
December	6	John Payne	77	US	Actor	Miracle on 34th Street; The Razor's Edge
December	11	Howard Lang	78	UK	Actor	Gorgo; Date at Midnight
December	15	Ben Barzman	79	Canada	Screenwriter	The Fall of the Roman Empire; El Cid
December	15	Emile de Antonio	70	US	Director	Point of Order; Painters Painting
December	15	Jock Mahoney	70	US	Actor, Stuntman	The Land Unknown; Tarzan Goes to India
December	15	Edward Underdown	81	UK	Actor	Thunderball; Dr. Terror's House of Horrors
December	16	Aileen Pringle	94	US	Actress	Three Weeks; She's No Lady
December	16	Lee Van Cleef	64	US	Actor	The Good, the Bad and the Ugly; Escape from New York
December	16	Silvana Mangano	59	Italy	Actress	Bitter Rice; Death in Venice
December	17	Luciano Salce	67	Italy	Director, Screenwriter	Fantozzi; Slalom
December	19	Audrey Christie	77	US	Actress	Splendor in the Grass; Carosuel
December	25	Betty Garde	84	US	Actress	Call Northside 777; Caged
December	25	Robert Pirosh	79	US	Director, Screenwriter	Battleground; Go for Broke!

== Film debuts ==
- John Arcilla – Fight for Us
- Alexis Arquette – Last Exit to Brooklyn
- Yvan Attal – Love Without Pity
- Daniel Baldwin – Born on the Fourth of July
- William Baldwin – Born on the Fourth of July
- Patrick Breen – Nobody's Perfect
- Adrien Brody – New York Stories
- Billy Burke – Daredreamer
- Amira Casar – Erreur de jeunesse
- Vincent Cassel – Les cigognes n'en font qu'à leur tête
- Michael Chiklis – Wired
- Steve Coogan – Resurrected
- Kevin Corrigan – Lost Angels
- Kristen Dalton – Tango & Cash
- Embeth Davidtz – Mutator
- Kirsten Dunst – New York Stories
- Thomas Mikal Ford – Harlem Nights
- Vivica A. Fox – Born on the Fourth of July
- Willie Garson – Troop Beverly Hills
- Henry Goodman – Queen of Hearts
- Carla Gugino – Troop Beverly Hills
- Laura Harring – Silent Night, Deadly Night 3: Better Watch Out!
- Jared Harris – The Rachel Papers
- John Michael Higgins – Vampire's Kiss
- Serge Houde – Empire of Ash III
- Bryce Dallas Howard – Parenthood
- Kelly Hu – Friday the 13th Part VIII: Jason Takes Manhattan
- Toby Huss – Zadar! Cow from Hell
- Michael Imperioli – Alexa
- Jason Isaacs – The Tall Guy
- Katharine Isabelle – Cousins
- Allison Janney – Who Shot Pat?
- Paul Johansson – Midnight Matinee
- Jamie Kennedy – Dead Poets Society
- Tom Kenny – How I Got Into College
- Martin Lawrence – Do the Right Thing
- Harry Lennix – The Package
- Rex Linn – Night Game
- Tobey Maguire – The Wizard
- Matt Malloy – The Unbelievable Truth
- Costas Mandylor – Triumph of the Spirit
- Samantha Mathis – The Bulldance
- Heather McComb – New York Stories
- Ray McKinnon – Driving Miss Daisy
- Larry Miller – Out Cold
- Michael Moore (director) – Roger & Me
- Bebe Neuwirth – Say Anything...
- Dean Norris – Police Academy 6: City Under Siege
- Josh Pais – Jacknife
- Steve Park – Do the Right Thing
- Mary-Louise Parker – Signs of Life
- Nathaniel Parker – War Requiem
- Rosie Perez – Do the Right Thing
- Jim Piddock – Lethal Weapon 2
- John C. Reilly – Casualties of War
- Gloria Reuben – Immediate Family
- Sam Rockwell – Clownhouse
- Rene Russo – Major League
- Bill Sage – The Unbelievable Truth
- Ludivine Sagnier – Les Maris, les Femmes, les Amants
- Adam Sandler – Going Overboard
- Annabella Sciorra – True Love
- Kimberly Scott – The Abyss
- Molly Shannon – The Phantom of the Opera
- Tom Sizemore – Lock Up
- Michael Bailey Smith – A Nightmare on Elm Street 5: The Dream Child
- Tara Strong – The Long Road Home
- Wes Studi – Powwow Highway
- Emma Thompson – The Tall Guy
- Aida Turturro – True Love
- Skeet Ulrich – Weekend at Bernie's
- Yorick van Wageningen – Wilde Harten
- Dylan Walsh – Loverboy
- David Warshofsky – Last Exit to Brooklyn
- Muse Watson – Black Rainbow
- Jake Weber – Born on the Fourth of July
- Michael Jai White – The Toxic Avenger Part II
- Elijah Wood – Back to the Future Part II
