= Kaspar Velberg =

Estonian actor (born 1989)

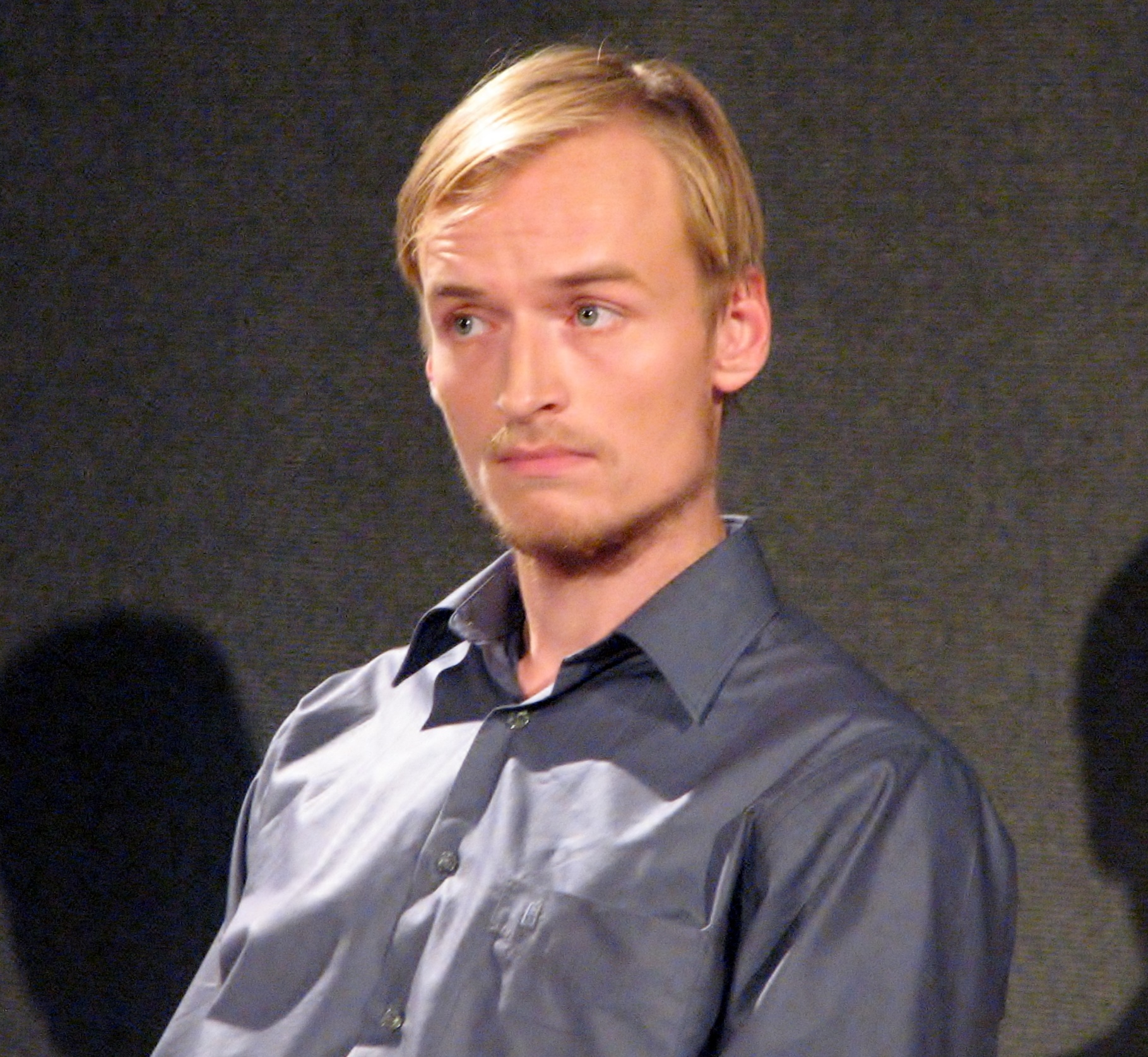
- Velberg in 2013
- Born: 29 January 1989 (age 37); Padise Parish, then part of Estonian SSR, Soviet Union
- Education: Estonian Academy of Music and Theatre
- Occupation: Actor
- Years active: 2010–present
- Partner: Liis Pokinen
- Children: 2

Kaspar Velberg (born 29 January 1989) is an Estonian stage, television, film and voice actor. After graduating from drama school in 2012, he began an engagement at the Tallinn City Theatre as a stage actor and made his film debut in a starring role as Karl Tammik in the 2015 war drama 1944.

== Early life and education ==
Kaspar Velberg was born in Padise Parish (now part of present-day Lääne-Harju Parish) to parents Arvo and Reet Velberg (née Põder). Both of his parents were foresters. He is the youngest of three children, with two older sisters. He spent his earliest childhood in Vihterpalu before the family moved to Saue when he was in the second grade, where attended schools. In his youth, his sister persuaded him to become involved in theatre and in the sixth grade, he joined the Saue Gymnasium theatre group created by Virko Annus. In his youth, he attended summer theatre camp in Karepa.

In 2008, he was accepted into the Estonian Academy of Music and Theatre's (EMTA) School of Performing Arts Department in Tallinn and studied under course supervisor Elmo Nüganen, graduating in 2012. Among his graduating classmates were actors Piret Krumm, Priit Pius, Märt Pius, Pääru Oja, Liis Lass, Maiken Schmidt, Henrik Kalmet, and Karl-Andreas Kalmet.

== Career ==
=== Stage ===
Following graduation from the Estonian Academy of Music and Theatre, Velberg began an engagement at the Tallinn City Theatre in August 2012, where he currently is still employed. Among his more notable roles to date at the theatre were in productions of works by Peter Barnes, Molière, A. H. Tammsaare, Tom Stoppard, Ferenc Molnár, John Steinbeck, Otfried Preußler, Rodney Ackland, Marina Carr, Michael Cristofer, William Shakespeare, Duncan Macmillan, Anton Chekhov, August Strindberg, Eduard Bornhöhe, Daniel Glattauer, August Gailit, Paavo Piik, and Diana Leesalu.

Velberg has also performed onstage at the Estonian Drama Theatre in Tallinn in 2012, the Arhipelaag MTÜ in Kärdla in 2013, and the Saueaugu Theatre Farm in Ohtla in 2015.

=== Film ===
In 2015, Velberg made his film debut in the Ronet Tänav-directed Baltic Film, Media, Arts and Communication School of Tallinn University comedy short film Kivamees, opposite Estonian Academy of Music and Theatre classmate Pääru Oja and Doris Tislar. The same year, he was cast in a starring role of Karl Tammik in the feature-length war drama 1944, directed by former Estonian Academy of Music and Theatre course supervisor Elmo Nüganen. The film premiered in February 2015 in Berlin, Germany, before its release in Estonia. It was selected as the Estonian entry for the Best Foreign Language Film at the 88th Academy Awards, but it was not nominated.

The following year, he appeared as Ralf in the Anu Aun directed Luxfilm youth drama Polaarpoiss. In 2018, he was cast in a starring role as Igor in the Ari Alexander Ergis Magnússon directed Icelandic-Estonian coproduction drama film Mihkel, opposite actors Tómas Lemarquis, Pääru Oja, and Atli Rafn Sigurðsson.

Velberg has also appeared in several foreign-language films. In 2020, he appeared in a small role as a police operator in the Christopher Nolan directed Warner Bros. Pictures English-language science fiction action thriller Tenet, which was filmed, in part, in Estonia. The same year, he appeared as a bicycle dealer in the Anders Thomas Jensen written and directed Danish action comedy film Riders of Justice for Nordisk Film. In 2021, he appeared as Pilot Selenov in the English-language period romantic drama Firebird, directed by Estonian Peeter Rebane, and filmed on location in Estonia.

In 2022, he had a small role as a reporter in the Estonian period sports drama Kalev, directed by Ove Musting.

Velberg has also worked as a voice actor, dubbing animated foreign films into the Estonian language. In 2018, he voiced the role of Héctor for the Estonian release of the 2017 American animated fantasy film Coco. In 2019, he was the voice of Kristoff for the Estonian release of the Walt Disney Animation Studios' animated musical fantasy film Frozen II.

=== Television ===
In 2013, Velberg made his television debut as the character Kristjan Malman on an episode of the popular, long-running TV3 comedy-crime series Kättemaksukontor. He has also appeared in episodes of the Kanal 2 crime drama series Viimane võmm in 2015, and the Kanal 2 comedy series Alo in 2021.

In 2021, he played a starring role as Mark in the six-part miniseries thriller Tulejoonel, directed by Ergo Kuld and penned by Martin Algus. The series streamed on the Elisa Elamuse Huub service. Velberg's performance won him the Best Male Actor at the 2021 Estonian Film and Television Awards.

In 2023, he appeared as Andres in the Elisa Elamuse Huub streamed drama series Täiuslik sõbranna. In 2024, he became a cast member of the TV3 drama series Valetamisklubi as the character Mihkel.

== Personal life ==
Kaspar Velberg is in a long-term relationship with choreographer Liis Pokinen, sister of actress and singer Mari Pokinen. The two met while Velberg was still a student at the Estonian Academy of Music and Theatre. In 2018, the couple had their first child, a daughter named Lilian. In 2020, the couple had their second child, a daughter.

Velberg is an avid fisherman.

== Acknowledgements ==
- Ants Lauter Award (2021)
- Leida Rammo City Theatre Fund scholarship (2022)
