= Eia's Christmas at Phantom Owl Farm =

2018 film directed by Anu Aun

- Directed by: Anu Aun
- Produced by: Maie Rosmann-Lill, Maario Masing
- Production companies: Luxfilm, Kinosaurus Film
- Release date: 2018
- Country: Estonia
- Language: Estonian

Eia's Christmas at Phantom Owl Farm (also titled Eia's Christmas Mission; Estonian: Eia jõulud Tondikakul) is a 2018 Estonian children's adventure film directed by Anu Aun.

The film's protagonist is a 10-year-old girl Eia, who spends her Christmas holiday in the mysterious farmstead in Southern Estonia. In the farmstead she encounters several challenges and adventures, including rescuing an old primeval forest and finding her family's biggest secret.

== Cast ==
Cast:

- Paula Rits as Eia
- Siim Oskar Ots as Ats
- Liis Lemsalu as Jete
- Jaan Rekkor as Ott
- Märt Pius as Moorits
- Priit Pius as Laurits
- Priit Võigemast as Oskar
- Mirtel Pohla as Lilli
- Anne Reemann as Juuli
- Tõnu Oja as August
- Tambet Tuisk as Kaarel
- Juhan Ulfsak as Raiesmiku Raivo
- Meelis Rämmeld as Traktori Pets
- Marvin Inno as Robi
- Annabrith Heinmaa as Sonja
- Maria Annus as Sonja's mother
- Robert Annus as Sonja's father
- Riho Kütsar as Policeman
