= 1944 (film) =

2015 film

- Film poster
- Directed by: Elmo Nüganen
- Written by: Leo Kunnas
- Produced by: Maria Avdjuško; Ilkka Matila; Kristjan Rahu; Kristian Taska; Anna Tjurina
- Starring: Kaspar Velberg; Kristjan Üksküla; Maiken Schmidt
- Cinematography: Maksim Osadchiy
- Edited by: Kimmo Taavila; Tambet Tasuja
- Music by: Jaak Jürisson
- Production company: Taska Film
- Distributed by: Taska Film; MRP Matila Röhr Productions
- Release dates: 8 February 2015 (Berlin International Film Festival); 20 February 2015 (Estonia); 25 August 2015 (Finland)
- Running time: 100 minutes
- Countries: Estonia; Finland
- Languages: Estonian; German; Russian
- Budget: €1,500,000
- Box office: unknown

1944 is a 2015 Estonian war drama film directed by Elmo Nüganen. The film first premiered in February 2015 in Berlin, Germany, before its release in Estonia and other northern European countries. It was selected as the Estonian entry for the Best Foreign Language Film at the 88th Academy Awards but it was not nominated.

As the Soviet Union advances to recapture Estonia from its German occupiers, with huge losses on both sides, the film explores the mental conflicts of young Estonians who end up meeting on the battlefield to fight against each other. Some have volunteered or been conscripted into the German military, most with little commitment to the Nazi regime. Others have volunteered or been conscripted into the Soviet forces, again with little commitment to the Communist regime. Whichever side wins will regard the Estonians on the opposing side as traitors, liable to execution or deportation. Neither side offers the Estonians autonomy from foreign control.

== Plot ==
The film opens in July 1944 on the Tannenberg Line in Estonia, where a unit of Estonian Waffen-SS soldiers are fighting the advancing Red Army. A visit by a Nazi official, who hands out signed photographs of Hitler, attracts ridicule. The Soviet forces are superior in numbers of tanks and infantry and the German forces have to retreat through streams of civilian refugees. After a ferocious battle, the victors are a Red Army Estonian unit.

As they bury the dead of both sides in a mass grave, an Estonian in the Red Army called Jüri searches the body of an Estonian in the German forces called Karl and finds an unposted letter to Karl's sister Aino in Tallinn. When the Soviets capture the city, he delivers the letter in person and he and Aino become friendly, which incurs the enmity of his unit's political officer. Back fighting on the Sõrve Peninsula during the Moonsund operation in November, Jüri's unit captures a group of sixteen-year-old Estonian boys in German uniform. The political officer orders Jüri to kill them all and, when he questions the decision, shoots Jüri dead. The officer himself is executed by one of Jüri's comrades seconds later. On Jüri's body, a comrade finds an unposted letter to Aino which he, when he has a spell of leave, delivers in person.

== Cast ==
- Kaspar Velberg as Sturmmann Karl Tammik
- Kristjan Üksküla as Senior sergeant Jüri Jõgi
- Maiken Schmidt as Aino Tammik
- Gert Raudsep as Oberscharführer Ants Saareste
- Ain Mäeots as Captain Evald Viires
- Peeter Tammearu as a Partorg (Communist Party official)
- Märt Pius and Priit Pius as the Käär Brothers
- Hendrik Toompere Jr. Jr. as Rottenführer Kristjan Põder
- Kristjan Sarv as Abram Joffe
- Rain Simmul as Prohhor Sedõhh
- Martin Mill as Alfred Tuul
- Ivo Uukkivi as Rudolf Kask
- Marko Leht as Valter Hein
- Mait Malmsten as Government figure
- Magnús Mariuson as The Dane Carl
- Pääru Oja as Oberschütze (Sanitar) Elmar Säinas
- Külli Teetamm as Mother with children
- Kristo Viiding as Leonhard Talu
- Karl-Andreas Kalmet as Vladimir Kamenski
- Henrik Kalmet as Voldemar Piir
- Priit Loog as Paul Mets
- Priit Strandberg as Lembit Raadik
- Andero Ermel as Oskar Lepik
- Jaak Prints as Richard Pastak
- Tõnu Oja as Omakaitse lieutenant
- Anne Reemann as Omakaitse female fighter
- Anne Margiste as Farm woman

== Production ==
The first part of filming took place from October 2013 till the Easter break of 2014. It then continued at the start of the summer of 2014 where filming also took place at the Sinimäed Hills.

The film was funded by the Estonian Film Institute, the Estonian Ministry of Defence, the Cultural Endowment of Estonia and private investments.

Overall 4 original soviet T-34 tanks in running condition were used during the production. One was borrowed from Finland war museum, two from private museums in Finland. The 4th tank was borrowed from Eesti vabadusvõitluse muuseum/Estonian freedom fighting museum. Eagle-eyed viewers can spot, based on the shape of one tank's wheels, that it was made either in 1945 or 1946, when wheel shape got slightly modified compared to the original design. For battle scenes, three additional tank props were used which were blown up during filming.

== Reception ==
On the film aggregation website IMDb, 1944 has a weighted average score of 7.5/10, based on votes from 1,005 users.

The film has been banned in the Russian Federation.

=== Box office ===
In Estonia, 1944 was a huge box office success. With local opening weekend admissions at 19,030, 1944 set a new opening weekend record for an Estonian film, beating the previous record of 15,611 admissions set by Names in Marble in 2002. 1944's first week also broke records by achieving 44,879 admissions, the highest ever for an Estonian film that premiered in Estonia.

== See also ==
- List of submissions to the 88th Academy Awards for Best Foreign Language Film
- List of Estonian submissions for the Academy Award for Best Foreign Language Film
