= Liis Lass =

Estonian actress (born 1989)

Liis Remmel
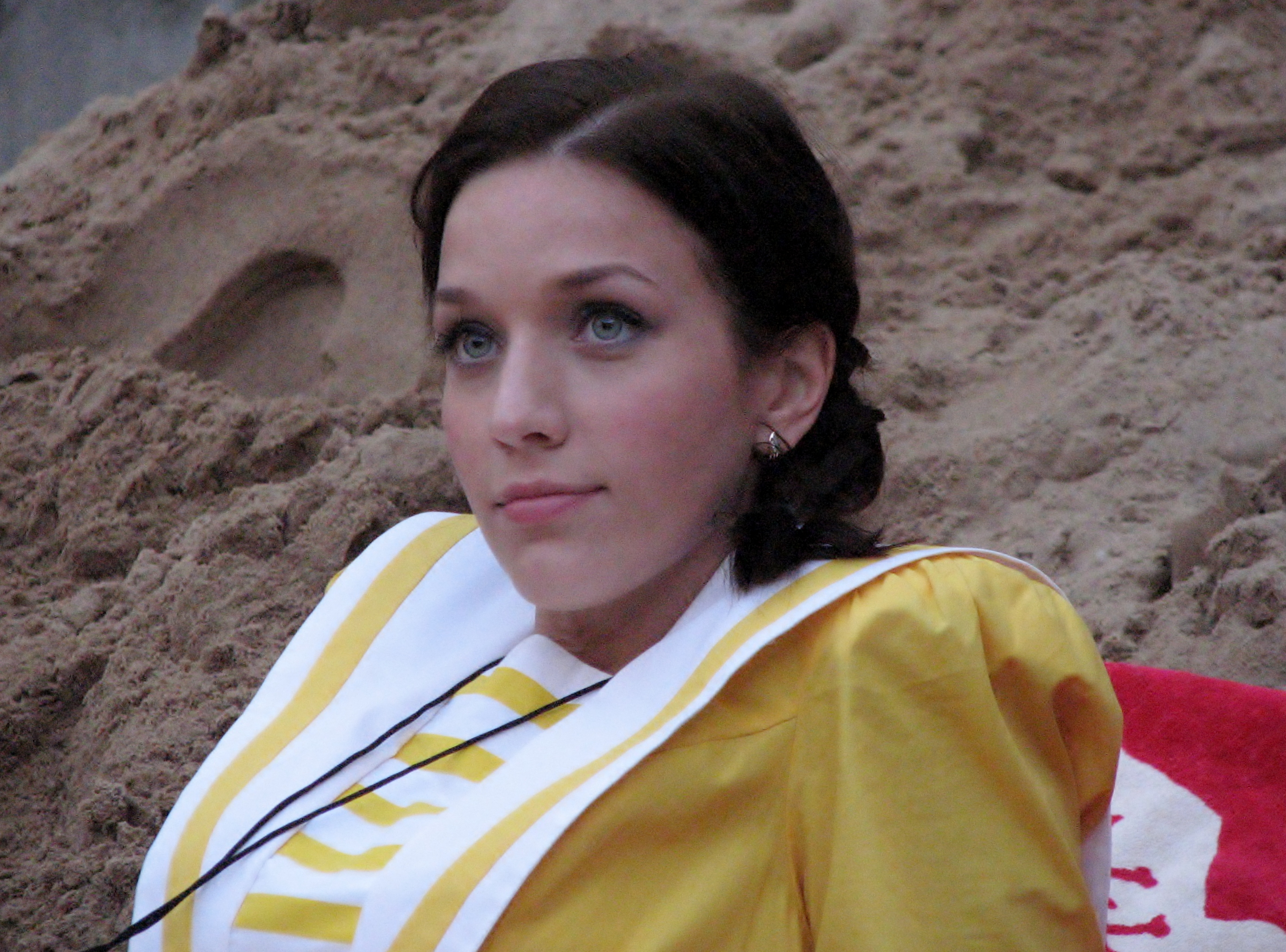
- Born: 2 April 1989 (age 37); Põltsamaa, then part of Estonian SSR, Soviet Union
- Occupation: Actress
- Years active: 2005 – present
- Spouse: Joel Remmel
- Children: 1

Liis Remmel (until 2021, Liis Lass; born 2 April 1989) is an Estonian stage, film, and television actress.

== Early life and education ==
Liis Remmel (maiden name Lass) was born in Põltsamaa, Jõgeva County in 1989. She graduated from secondary school at the Põltsamaa Gymnasium in 2008. Afterward, she studied acting at the Estonian Academy of Music and Theatre in Tallinn under course supervisor Elmo Nüganen, graduating in 2012 after appearing in diploma productions in works by Neil Simon, Molière, Alexander "Sasha" Pepelyaev, and Polly Stenham. Among her graduating classmates were: Henrik Kalmet, Karl-Andreas Kalmet, Priit Pius, Märt Pius, Pääru Oja, Piret Krumm, Maiken Schmidt, and Kaspar Velberg.

== Stage career ==
Following graduation in 2012, Liis Remmel became engaged as an actress at the Tallinn City Theatre in August 2012. Her first role at the theatre following her engagement was Ramilda in an Elmo Nüganen directed production of A. H. Tammsaare's sweeping historic social epic Tõde ja õigus. Lass has appeared in a number of stage productions by such authors and playwrights as: Shakespeare, Tom Stoppard, Peter Barnes, Diana Leesalu, William Boyd, Rodney Ackland, Jean-Luc Lagarce, and David Lindsay-Abaire, among others.

== Film and television ==
In 2012, Liis Remmel made her first appearance on television in the role of Liisbet Reino on two episodes of the popular TV3 comedy-crime series Kättemaksukontor. This was followed by the recurring role of Anet on the Kanal 2 television crime serial Viimane võmm from 2014 until 2015, and the recurring role of Marion in the Kanal 2 television drama serial Restart in 2015.

Between 2010 and 2014, Remmel appeared in six short films for Baltic Film and Media School's Media Department; in many of which she was paired with Estonian Academy of Music and Theatre classmate Pääru Oja.

In 2012, Remmel appeared in director Ilmar Raag's French-Estonian drama Une Estonienne à Paris, playing the small role of Anne's daughter. The film stars Estonian actress Laine Mägi as Anne, an older woman who travels to Paris to care for an elderly Estonian émigré named Frida (played by French actress Jeanne Moreau), only to discover that she is not wanted.

In 2015, Remmel had a starring role as Anne in the Urmas Eero Liiv directed thriller Must alpinist for Kopli Kinokompanii. The film is based on a 1989 incident involving director Urmas Eero Liiv and partly filmed in the Buryat village of Kyren where it allegedly took place. It also bears some resemblance to the Dyatlov Pass incident of 2 February 1959, where nine ski hikers mysteriously died in the northern Ural Mountains after establishing a camp on the slopes of Kholat Syakhl. In 2018, she appeared as Moonika, a young mother who abandons her newborn infant to the care of her ex-boyfriend, in the Liina Triškina-Vanhatalo-directed Allfilm drama Võta või jäta. In 2022, she appeared in the role of Liis in the Ergo Kuld directed and period romance-drama Soo, screen written by Martin Algus and based on the 1914 novel of the same name by Oskar Luts.

== Personal life ==
She was in romantic relationship with cameraman and cinematographer Ants Martin Vahur. In 2021, she wed musician Joel Remmel, who was previously married to singer Laura Põldvere. In February 2022, the couple had a daughter named Deboora.
