= 1989 in Estonian television =

This is a list of Estonian television related events from 1989.

== Births ==
- 29 January - Kaspar Velberg, actor
- 8 February - Karl-Andreas Kalmet, actor
- 2 April - Liis Lass, actress
- 1 March - Karl-Erik Taukar, singer and TV host
- 16 May - Pääru Oja, actor

== Deaths ==
- 14 December - Ants Eskola, actor and director
