= O2 (2020 film) =

2020 film directed by Margus Paju

- Directed by: Margus Paju
- Written by: Tom Abrams; Tiit Aleksejev; Eriikka Etholén-Paju; Olle Mirme
- Produced by: Jukka Helle; Jānis Kalējs; Andreas Kask; Diana Mikita; Esko Rips; Kristian Taska; Lukas Trimonis; Hanna Virolainen
- Starring: Priit Võigemast; Kaspars Znotiņš; Ieva Andrejevaitė; Tiit Lilleorg; Sampo Sarkola; Pääru Oja; Tambet Tuisk; Rein Oja; Elmo Nüganen
- Cinematography: Meelis Veeremets
- Edited by: Marion Koppel; Vytis Puronas (Sound)
- Music by: Ēriks Ešenvalds; Rihards Zaļupe
- Distributed by: Nafta Films (Estonia); Taska Film (Estonia)
- Release date: 9 October 2020
- Running time: 100 minutes
- Countries: Estonia; Finland; Latvia; Lithuania
- Languages: Estonian; Finnish; Russian; German; French
- Box office: $ 42 235

O2 (also known as Dawn of War in the UK) is a 2020 Estonian-Latvian-Lithuanian-Finnish historical spy thriller film, directed by Margus Paju, starring Sampo Sarkala, Kaspars Znotiņš, Elmo Nüganen, Rein Oja and Tambet Tuisk. The film is about the Estonian intelligence officer Feliks Kangur (played by Priit Võigemast) who has to uncover a traitor in the secret service in 1939, on the eve of Estonia losing its independence. The film was written by Tom Abrams, Tiit Aleksejev, Eriikka Etholén-Paju and Olle Mirme.

The film was produced by Nafta Films (Estonia) and Taska Film (Estonia), and coproduced by Film Angels Studio (Latvia), IN SCRIPT (Lithuania) and Finland's Solar Films. It was supported by the Estonian Film Institute. The film was released in cinemas in Estonia on 9 October 2020.

== Cast ==
- Priit Võigemast as Feliks Kangur
- Kaspars Znotiņš as Ivan Kostrov
- Agnese Cīrule as Maria Dubrawska
- Ieva Andrejevaitė as Tatjana Kostrova
- Tiit Lilleorg as Professor
- Sampo Sarkola as Finnish spy Hannu
- Pääru Oja as Peeter Parik
- Tambet Tuisk as Johan Sõber
- Rein Oja as Colonel Saar
- Elmo Nüganen as Major Kurg
- Vaidotas Martinaitis as NKVD interrogator
- Valentin Novopolskij as Red Army major Kozlov
- Indrek Ojari as Andres Piirisild
- Alo Kõrve as Paul Parik
- Hele Kõrve as Edith Parik
- Amanda Hermiine Künnapas as Johan Sõber's lover
- Doris Tislar as Linda Ahven
- Gilberto Pulga as French Ambassador
- Dainis Sumišķis as Kirill Kozlov
- Gatis Gāga as GRU agent Zorin
- Tõnu Oja as Factory manager
- Johan Kristjan Aimla as Second Lieutenant Toomas Otsing
- Lukas Petrauskas as Red Army first lieutenant Krinski
- Marek Rosenberg as Soldier
- Kristiina-Hortensia Port as Woman at telephone exchange
- Taavo Vellend as Man at tennis court
- Jasper Terik as child in the background
