= Goodbye Soviet Union =

- Directed by: Lauri Randla
- Written by: Lauri Randla
- Produced by: Peeter Urbla; Mark Lwoff; Misha Jaari
- Starring: Niklas Kouzmitšev; Nika Savolainen; Ülle Kaljuste; Tõnu Oja; Pääru Oja; Elene Baratašvili; Jekaterina Novosjolova
- Cinematography: Elen Lotman
- Edited by: Leo Liesvirta; Andres Hallik
- Production companies: Exitfilm; Bufo
- Release date: July 10, 2020
- Running time: 86 minutes
- Countries: Estonia; Finland
- Languages: Finnish; Estonian; Russian

Goodbye Soviet Union (Estonian: Hüvasti, NSVL, Finnish: Näkemiin Neuvostoliitto) is a 2020 Estonian-Finnish tragicomedy film and the first Ingrian film. It was written and directed by Lauri Randla.

== Plot ==
Set during the final years of the Soviet Union, the film follows Johannes (Niklas Kouzmitšev), a young boy growing up in an Ingrian family in Soviet Estonia. Johannes's free-spirited mother (Nika Savolainen) is drawn to Western ideals, while his grandmother (Ülle Kaljuste) hopes to raise him as a loyal Soviet citizen. Amid the backdrop of Estonia's push for independence, Johannes navigates family tensions, his mother's emigration to Finland, and his first love with a Chechen girl named Vera (Elene Baratašvili).

== Cast ==
- Niklas Kouzmitšev - Johannes
- Nika Savolainen - Mother
- Ülle Kaljuste - Grandmother
- Tõnu Oja - Grandfather
- Pääru Oja - Uncle Kolja
- Elene Baratašvili - Vera
- Jekaterina Novosjolova - Lidia
- Luule Komissarov

== Production ==
The film was financed by Estonian Film Institute, Finnish Film Foundation, Eurimages, and Eesti Kultuurkapital, and was co-produced with Yle. Distribution in Finland was handled by B-Plan Distribution. Both Estonian Film Institute and the Finnish Film Foundation expressed strong early interest in the project. Notably, it became the largest single investment by Estonian Film Institute.

== Reception ==
The film was initially slated for release in March 2020, but its premiere was delayed. Pre-screenings in June were met with high demand, selling out in parts of the Helsinki metropolitan area.

=== Reviews ===
The film received generally positive reviews, with praise for its humor and unique perspective on Soviet life.

Rating (out of 5) | Reference
Karjalainen | 4/5 |
Me Naiset | 4/5 |
Helsingin Sanomat | 2/5 |
