= Taska Film =

Film production company based in Estonia

== About Taska Film OÜ ==
Taska Film OÜ sometimes credited as Taska Productions (owned and founded by Kristian Taska) is an Estonian film production company responsible for producing the number 1 Estonian box office hit during the last decade: Names in Marble. The company was founded in 2000 by Kristian Taska and is known for its focus on historical films. Its productions include some of Estonia’s most-watched films, such as the Melchior the Apothecary trilogy, Names in Marble (2002), and 1944 (2015). In 2022, they produced Melchior the Apothecary.

Taska Film has produced and co-produced over 30 feature films, TV dramas, and documentaries for both local and international markets. The company has been a trailblazer in Estonia’s film scene, pioneering private financing and new formats. For instance, The Eternal Road was the first film made with the support of the Film Estonia rebate program, and Melchior the Apothecary was released in both film and series formats.

The company has been involved in international co-productions across the US, Germany, Austria, Sweden, Denmark, Finland, Latvia, and Lithuania. Taska Film has helped bring Estonian filmmaking to increasingly broader audiences.

In addition to Kristian Taska, producers Adeele Meri and Carmen Laurend are also part of the Taska Film team.

Taska Film collaborates with several other Estonian production companies, including Apollo Film Productions, HansaFilm, Nafta Films, and others.

They have worked with acclaimed directors such as Elmo Nüganen, Jaak Kilmi, Ergo Kuld, Ain Mäeots, René Vilbre, Margus Paju, and Helen Takkin. Their projects have been supported by the Estonian Film Institute, Cultural Endowment of Estonia, Ministry of Defence, Tartu Film Fund, and the Ida-Viru Film Fund.

=== About Kristian Taska ===
Kristian Taska was born on 23 November 1973 and is the producer of Estonian feature films like Names in Marble (2002), Set Point (2004) (Estonian: Täna öösel me ei maga) directed by Ilmar Taska, Röövlirahnu Martin (2005) directed by René Vilbre.

He began his education at Tallinn Secondary School No. 7 and later studied at Santa Monica College in the United States, where he focused on business management, screenwriting, and film history. He continued his business studies at Concordia International University.

Kristian Taska started his career at Kanal 2, Estonia’s oldest private television channel. In 1993, he helped his father, Ilmar Taska, establish the channel and was one of its shareholders. He initially worked there as head of marketing, later becoming the CEO and a board member.

In 2000, Taska founded Taska Film. From 2005 to 2006, he served as the director and board member of the Estonian Drama Theatre.

He is a member of the ACE Producers network and an alumnus of the European Film Promotion program.

Kristian Taska’s father is Ilmar Taska, a film director, producer, screenwriter, and writer. His great-grandfather, Eduard Taska, was a pioneer of modern Estonian leathercraft.

Kristian is married to Veronica Taska (née Puhk), and they have two children together. In total, Taska has four children. Since 2017, he and his wife Veronica Taska have been producing extra virgin olive oil at Casa Fontestate in the Le Marche region of Italy.

=== Selected filmography ===
- Never Alone – dir. Klaus Härö (2025)
- The Shadow – dir. Jaak Kilmi (2024)
- Life and Love – dir. Helen Takkin (2024)
- The Crippled Brides – dir. Ergo Kuld (2023)
- Melchior the Apothecary. The Executioner’s Daughter – dir. Elmo Nüganen (2023)
- The Vacationers – dir. Ergo Kuld (2023)
- Fools of Fame – dir. Ain Mäeots (2023)
- All the Sins season 3 – dir. Mika Ronkainen (2022)
- Melchior the Apothecary. The Ghost – dir. Elmo Nüganen (2022)
- Melchior the Apothecary – dir. Elmo Nüganen (2022)
- The Bog – dir. Ergo Kuld (2022)
- Hunting Season – dir. Ergo Kuld (2021)
- Estonian Funeral – dir. René Vilbre (2021)
- O2 – dir. Margus Paju (2020)
- All the Sins season 2 – dir. Mika Ronkainen (2020)
- Winter – dir. Ergo Kuld (2020)
- Fred Jüssi. The Beauty of Being documentary – dir. Jaan Tootsen (2020)
- All the Sins season 1 – dir. Mika Ronkainen (2019)
- Class Reunion 3: Godfathers – dir. René Vilbre (2019)
- Class Reunion 2: Weddings and a Funeral – dir. René Vilbre (2018)
- The Eternal Road – dir. AJ Annila (2017)
- The Dissidents – dir. Jaak Kilmi (2017)
- Class Reunion – dir. René Vilbre (2016)
- 1944 – dir. Elmo Nüganen (2015)
- The Purge – dir. Antti Jokinen (2012)
- The Phobos – dir. Oleg Assadulin (2010)
- Red Mercury – dir. Andres Puustusmaa (2010)
- Golden Beach – dir. Jüri Sillart (2006)
- Reckless – dir. Elmo Nüganen (2006)
- Mat the Cat – dir. René Vilbre (2005)
- Set Point – dir. Ilmar Task (2004)
- Names in Marble – dir. Elmo Nüganen (2002)

=== International Success ===
Taska Film is also one of Estonia’s most successful production companies internationally, with its films sold to numerous countries. 1944 (2015), for example, reached 25 countries, including the US, France, Germany, and Japan. The Dissidents (2017) was acquired by Netflix and released in Chinese cinemas. Melchior the Apothecary (2022) was distributed in France, Portugal, Germany, Austria, and Australia.

Taska Film has co-produced with partners in the US, Denmark, Sweden, Germany, Austria, Latvia, Lithuania, and beyond. Notable international co-productions include The Purge, The Eternal Road, and Never Alone.

A long-term international partner is Finland’s MRP Matila Röhr Productions.

=== Domestic Success ===
Taska Film’s first major hit, Names in Marble (2002), was a major box office success and for many years held the record as Estonia’s most-watched post-independence film with 168,113 viewers. That record was broken by Class Reunion, which drew nearly 189,100 viewers and surpassed the €1 million revenue mark. Its sequel Class Reunion 2: Weddings and a Funeral became Estonia’s most-watched film of 2018.
