= The Little Comrade (2018 film) =

2018 film directed by Moonika Siimets

Little Comrade (Estonian film)
- Directed by: Moonika Siimets
- Produced by: Riina Sildos
- Production company: Amrion
- Release date: 2018
- Country: Estonia
- Languages: Estonian, Russian

The Little Comrade (Estonian: Seltsimees laps) is a 2018 Estonian film directed by Moonika Siimets and based on the novels Seltsimees laps ja suured inimesed ('The Little Comrade') and Samet ja saepuru ehk Seltsimees laps ja kirjatähed ('Velvet and Sawdust') by Leelo Tungal.

The film depicts the era of Stalinist tyranny in Estonia. The film's protagonist is six-year old girl Leelo whose mother (school director) is sent to a Siberian prison camp. Mother's last words are that if Leelo is a good girl, then mother will be soon back. Leelo is trying to do her best to fulfill mother's request.

== Cast ==
- Tambet Tuisk as Feliks
- Helena Maria Reisner as Leelo
- Yuliya Aug as Ljudmilla
- Juhan Ulfsak as Paul Varik
- Maria Avdjuško as Makajeva
- Argo Aadli as Rider Jaan
- Indrek Taalmaa as Uncle Artur
- Maarja Jakobson as Aunt Liilia
- Aarne Soro as Uncle Ott
- Kadri Rämmeld as Aunt Iida
- Tarmo Song as Uncle Mart
- Liina Vahtrik as Aunt Anne
- Maria Klenskaja as Grandmother
- Lembit Peterson as Grandfather
- Anna Sergejeva as Galina
- Hilje Murel as Hairdresser Olja
- Carmen Mikiver as Hairdresser Carmen
- Sandra Uusberg as Hairdresser Sandra
- Pille Pürg as Officer's Wife
- Aleksander Okunev as Russian Officer
- Liisa Pulk as Teacher Seeneke
- Luule Komissarov as Ticket officer in the bus Tiiu
- Sten Karpov as Soldier Dima
- Juri Zilin as Chekist Valeri
- Ene Järvis as Blonde Lady
- Anne Reemann as voice
- Eva Klemets as Helmes
- Klaus Peeter Rüütli as Pedestrian
- Taavo Vellend as Man in Town Hall square
