= Burial (film) =

- Film poster
- Directed by: Ben Parker
- Written by: Ben Parker
- Produced by: Matthew James Wilkinson; Paul Higgins
- Starring: Charlotte Vega; Harriet Walter; Tom Felton; Barry Ward; Dan Renton Skinner; Bill Milner; Jaan Rekkor; Tambet Tuisk
- Cinematography: Rein Kotov
- Edited by: Ellie Jhonson
- Music by: Alex Baranowski
- Production companies: Stigma Films; Fields Park; Allfilm
- Release date: September 2, 2022
- Country: United Kingdom
- Language: English

Burial is a 2022 British war thriller film written and directed by Ben Parker. The film is produced by Matthew James Wilkinson and Paul Higgins. The film was released on 2 September 2022.

== Plot summary ==
After the Fall of Berlin, a group of Red Army soldiers are ordered to transport a large case to Moscow. The contents are unknown but they are ordered to bury it every night. After crossing into Poland, they encounter Werwolf units, local Polish resistance fighters and disobedient troops in their own squad while attempting to complete their mission.

== Cast ==
- Charlotte Vega
- Harriet Walter
- Tom Felton
- Barry Ward
- Dan Renton Skinner
- Bill Milner
- Niall Murphy
- Kristo Viiding
- Bashka Forrest
- Sergei Furmanjuk
- David Alexander
- Jaan Bekkor
- Tambet Tuisk
- Ester Kuntu
