= Tiit Lilleorg =

Estonian actor (1941–2021)

- Born: 25 November 1941; Tartu, Estonia
- Died: 15 January 2021 (aged 79); Tartu, Estonia
- Occupation: Actor
- Spouse: Alla Lilleorg (née Udovenko)

Tiit Lilleorg (25 November 1941 – 15 January 2021) was an Estonian stage, film and television actor and co-founder and director of the Ida Dance School.

== Early life ==
Tiit Lilleorg was born in Tartu, Estonia. His father Toivo Lilleorg was a journalist, and his mother was soprano and musician Helga Lilleorg (née Hansson). Lilleorg grew up with the theatre, as his mother performed as a choral singer, soloist, concertmaster and teacher at the Vanemuine theatre in Tartu. He studied acting at the Tallinn State Conservatory (now, the Estonian Academy of Music and Theatre) from 1961 until 1963, and the Leningrad Conservatory from 1966 until 1968.

== Stage career ==
From 1967 until 1976, he worked as an actor and the head of production at the Vanemuine theatre in Tartu and from 1976 until 1980, he was the theatre's administrator. From 1980 until 1992, and again in 1994, he returned to the stage as an actor at the Vanemuine.

== Film and television career ==
Apart from the stage, Tiit Lilleorg has performed as an actor in a number of television and film roles. In 1983, he starred in the Enn Vetemaa penned, Ago-Endrik Kerge directed Eesti Televisioon (ETV) comedy film Püha Susanna ehk meistrite kool in the role of Simeon Wolf, opposite Ita Ever and Urmas Kibuspuu. This was followed by the role of Aleksander Sõõritsa in the Ago-Endrik Kerge directed television drama film Võtmeküsimus in 1986. Other prominent roles were that of Sass in the 2005 Rainer Sarnet directed feature film Libahundi needus and as Professor Kantemir in the 2007 Rasmus Merivoo directed comedy film Buratino, based on the 1936 book The Golden Key, or the Adventures of Buratino by Russian author Aleksey Nikolayevich Tolstoy, which was itself based on the 1883 novel The Adventures of Pinocchio by Italian author Carlo Collodi.

He also appeared in a number of other Estonian television films and series, such as IT-planeet and Kättemaksukontor. In 2015, he appeared in the Margus Paju directed action-adventure film Supilinna Salaselts. In 2017, he appeared in the Priit Pääsuke directed feature film drama Keti lõpp. In 2020, he appeared in the Margus Paju directed World War II spy film O2.

Lilleorg's last film appearance was a small role in the English-language American Netflix miniseries The Queen's Gambit in 2020.

== Ida Dance School ==
In 1994, Lilleorg and his wife, former ballerina Alla Lilleorg, Tamara Kõrreveski and Kaljo Urbel founded the Tartu-based Ida Dance School (Estonian: Ida Tantsukool). The school was named in honor or Estonian dancer and ballet master Ida Urbel. Lilleorg also acted as the school's director.

== Personal life and death ==
In 1981, Tiit Lilleorg married former ballerina and dance teacher Alla Udovenko. They had one child; a daughter named Kristiina. He resided in Tartu.

In December 2020, Lilleorg was hospitalized after testing positive for COVID-19 during the COVID-19 pandemic in Estonia. He died of the virus in Tartu on 15 January 2021, aged 79.

== Selected filmography ==
- Sügis (English: Fall: 1990)
- Agent Sinikael (English release title: Agent Wild Duck, 2002)
- Sügisball (English: Autumn Ball, 2007)
- Supilinna Salaselts (English: The Secret Society of Souptown; 2015)
- O2 (2020)
