= Luule Komissarov =

Estonian actress

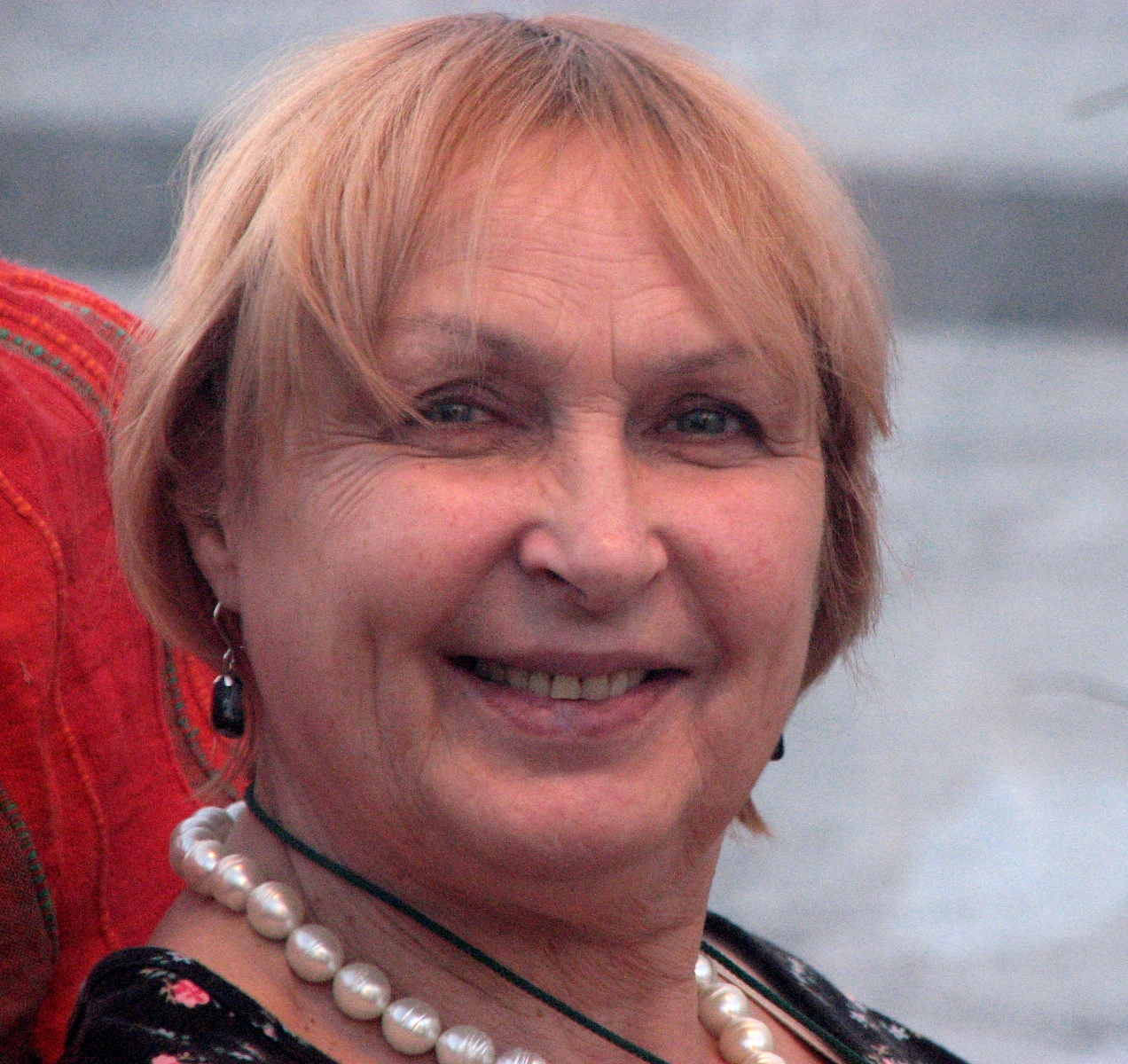
Luule Komissarov in 2011

Luule Komissarov (née Luule Proos, from 1964 until 1969 Luule Laanet, until 1974 Luule Paljasmaa; born on 11 August 1942 in Haapsalu) is an Estonian actress.

In 1965 she graduated from Tallinn State Conservatory Stage Art Department. From 1965-1992 she played at Estonian Youth Theatre. Since 1996 she has been a contracted actress at the Ugala Theatre. Besides theatre roles she has played also in several films.

She was formerly married to actor and journalist Aivo Paljasmaa and actor and director Kalju Komissarov.

== Awards ==
- 1983: Meritorious Artist of the Estonian SSR
- 2004: Order of the White Star, IV class.

== Selected filmography ==
- 1971: Metskapten
- 1984: Carolina's Silver Yarn
- 1987: The Wild Swans
- 1991: Lost Path
- 1993: Hysteria
- 1993: Õnne 13
- 1994: Tulivesi
- 1994: Jüri Rumm
- 1995: Wikmani poisid
- 2000: Armuke
- 2009: Kättemaksukontor (TV-series)
- 2018: Seltsimees laps
- 2019: Värvid must-valgel
- 2019: Tõde ja õigus
- 2020: My Dear Corpses
- 2020: Goodbye Soviet Union
- 2021: Firebird
