= Kristjan Sarv =

Estonian actor

Kristjan Sarv (born 21 December 1979) is an Estonian actor.

Sarv was born in Tartu. He studied acting at the Estonian Academy of Music and Theatre (2000–2004). From 2005 to 2008, he worked in the theatre NO99. He has appeared in several television series and feature films in Estonia and abroad.

== Selected filmography ==
- Nimed marmortahvlil (feature film, 2002)
- Kelgukoerad (TV series, 2007)
- Soovide puu (feature film, 2008)
- Tuulepealne maa (TV miniseries, 2008)
- Punane elavhõbe (feature film, 2010)
- Arne Dahl: Misterioso (TV miniseries, 2011)
- Vuosaari (feature film, 2012)
- Puhdistus (feature film, 2012)
- 1944 (feature film, 2015)
- The Bridge (TV miniseries, 2018)
- Mihkel (feature film, 2018)
- Kättemaksukontor (TV series, 2009–2019)
- Apteeker Melchior (feature film, 2022)
- Erik Kivisüda (feature film, 2022)
- Kalev (feature film, 2022)
