= List of French films of 1989 =

A list of films produced in France in 1989.

Title	Director	Cast	Genre	Notes
3615 code Père Noël	René Manzor	Alain Lalanne, Louis Ducreux, Brigitte Fossey	Horror thriller	
The 15 Year Old Girl	Jacques Doillon	Judith Godrèche, Melvil Poupaud	Drama	Entered into the 16th Moscow International Film Festival
Asterix and the Big Fight	Philippe Grimond		Animation	
Baptême	René Féret	Valérie Stroh, Jean-Yves Berteloot	Biopic	Won Golden Bayard award
Chimère	Claire Devers	Béatrice Dalle	Drama	Entered into the 1989 Cannes Film Festival
The Cook, the Thief, His Wife & Her Lover	Peter Greenaway	Richard Bohringer, Michael Gambon, Helen Mirren, Alan Howard	Crime drama art	British-French co-production
Gang of Four	Jacques Rivette	Bulle Ogier, Benoît Régent	Drama	Entered into the 39th Berlin International Film Festival
Hiver 54, l'abbé Pierre	Denis Amar	Lambert Wilson, Claudia Cardinale, Robert Hirsch	Drama	Robert Hirsch won the César Award for Best Supporting Actor
Je suis le seigneur du château	Régis Wargnier	Régis Arpin, Dominique Blanc	Thriller drama	1 nomination
Jesus of Montreal	Denys Arcand	Lothaire Bluteau, Catherine Wilkening	Drama	
La Révolution française	Robert Enrico	Jane Seymour, Peter Ustinov, Jean-François Balmer, Klaus Maria Brandauer	Historical Drama/Political Thriller	
Life and Nothing But	Bertrand Tavernier	Philippe Noiret, Sabine Azéma	Drama	
Monsieur Hire	Patrice Leconte	Michel Blanc, Sandrine Bonnaire	Drama	Entered into the 1989 Cannes Film Festival
Roselyne and the Lions	Jean-Jacques Beineix	Isabelle Pasco	Romantic drama	
Thick Skinned	Patricia Mazuy	Sandrine Bonnaire	Drama	Screened at the 1989 Cannes Film Festival
Trop belle pour toi	Bertrand Blier	Gérard Depardieu, Josiane Balasko	Comedy drama	6 wins & 7 nominations
Un tour de manège	Pierre Pradinas	Juliette Binoche, François Cluzet	Crime drama	
