= Tambet Tuisk =

Estonian actor

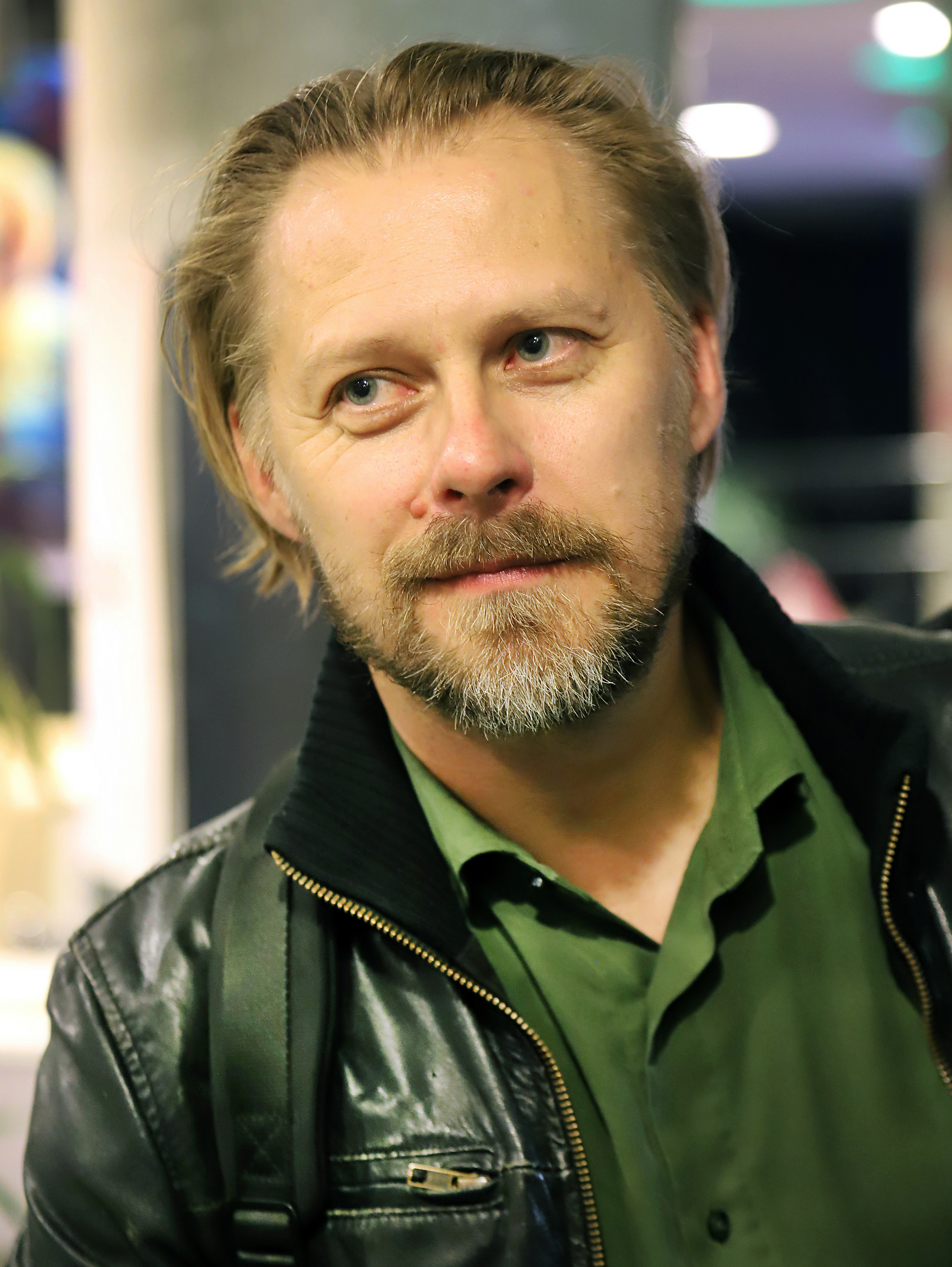
- Tambet Tuisk (2024)
- Born: 23 May 1976 (age 50)
- Occupation: Actor
- Years active: 1999–present

Tambet Tuisk (born 23 May 1976) is an Estonian actor. He has appeared in more than twenty films since 1999.

== Selected filmography ==
Year	Title	Role	Notes
2008	I Was Here	Olari	
2010	The Poll Diaries	Schnaps	
2011	The Idiot	Rogozin	
2014	Zero Point	Gunnar Post	
2016	Luuletaja ja luuletaja	Rasta	
2016	Dearest Sister	Jakob	
2017	Mehetapja/Süütu/Vari	Father Teofilos	
2018	Seltsimees laps	Feliks	
2018	Eia jõulud Tondikakul	Kaarel	
2020	O2	Johan Sõber	
2022	Burial	Col. Gorbinskiy	
2024	Two of Us	Tito	
