= Zero Point (film) =

2014 film by Mihkel Ulk

- Film poster
- Directed by: Mihkel Ulk
- Written by: Margit Keerdo-Dawson
- Produced by: Allfilm, Eesti Televisioon (Eesti Rahvusringhääling)
- Starring: Märt Pius; Saara Kadak
- Cinematography: Mihkel Soe
- Edited by: Hendrik Mägar, Margo Siimon
- Music by: Janek Murd
- Distributed by: Allfilm
- Release date: 4 December 2014
- Running time: 115 minutes
- Country: Estonia
- Language: Estonian

Zero Point (Estonian: Nullpunkt) is a 2014 Estonian drama film directed by Mihkel Ulk.

== Cast ==
- Märt Pius - Johannes
- Saara Kadak - Bianka
- Tambet Tuisk - Gunnar Post
- Mari Abel - Ege
- Christopher Rajaveer (:et) - Mihkel
- Liis Lindmaa - Riina
- Reimo Sagor - Bert
- Henrik Kalmet - Esko
- Taavi Teplenkov - Literature teacher
- Külliki Saldre - Teacher Irina
- Kärt Tomingas - Teacher Pille
- Kärt Tammjärv - Kreete
- Raimo Pass - Johannes' Father
- Ingmar Jõela - Raimo
- Aleksander Eeri Laupmaa - Karmo
- Brigitte Susanne Hunt - Paula (:et)
