= Mihkel (film) =

2018 film

- Directed by: Ari Alexander Ergis Magnússon
- Written by: Ari Alexander Ergis Magnússon, Attila Veres
- Produced by: Ari Alexander Ergis Magnússon, Friðrik Þór Friðriksson, Kristinn Þórðarson and Leifur Dagfinsson
- Starring: Tómas Lemarquis, Atli Rafn Sigurðsson, Pääru Oja
- Cinematography: Tómas Örn Tómasson
- Edited by: Davíð Alexander Corno
- Music by: Gyða Valtýsdóttir
- Release date: 12 October 2018
- Running time: 105 min
- Countries: Iceland, Estonia
- Languages: Icelandic, English, Estonian

Mihkel (Icelandic: Undir Halastjörnu) is a 2018 Icelandic-Estonian film directed by Ari Alexander Ergis Magnússon. It is based on true events from a 2004 criminal case in Iceland where a body was discovered by a chance by a diver in the Neskaupstaður harbor.

The film stars Icelanders Tómas Lemarquis and Atli Rafn Sigurðsson, and Estonians Pääru Oja as Mihkel and Kaspar Velberg as Igor. It premiered in Iceland on 12 October 2018.

== Cast ==
- Tómas Lemarquis as "Bóbó"
- Pääru Oja as Mihkel
- Atli Rafn Sigurðsson as Jóhann
- Kaspar Velberg as Igor
- Maiken Schmidt as Veera
- Greete-Elena Priisalu as Väike Veera
- Marko Matvere as Mihkel's Father
- Maarja Jakobson as Mihkel's Mother
- Ivo Uukkivi as Igor's Father
- Atli Rafn Sigurðsson as Johann
- Rein Oja as Pastor
- Kristjan Sarv as Assistant Pastor
- Þrúður Vilhjálmsdóttir as Doctor
- Heiddis Chadwick Hlynsdottir as Barbara Girl
