= Rein Oja =

Estonian actor, film director and theatre leader

Rein Oja (born 26 February 1956) is an Estonian actor, director, stage fight coreographer and teacher.

Rein Oja was born in Tallinn. He is the older brother of actor Tõnu Oja. In 1978 he graduated from Tallinn State Conservatory. In 1978-1997 he worked at Tallinn City Theatre. Since 1998 he is a freelancer. Since 2006 he is the head of Estonian Drama Theatre.

== Filmography ==
- 1989: Äratus (feature film; role: II Vallamees)
- 1997: All My Lenins (feature film; role: Bolshevik / NKVD Agent)
- 2003: Baltic Storm (feature film; role: Captain Arvo Kallas)
- 2006: Meeletu (feature film; role: Rommi)
- 2006: Vana daami visiit (feature film; role: Journalist)
- 2007: Georg (feature film; role: Richard)
- 2010: ENSV (television series: Olev Schellenberg)
- 2016: Polaarpoiss (feature film; role: Hanna's father)
- 2018: Mihkel (feature film; role: Sacristan)
- 2019: Lotte ja kadunud lohed (animated film; role: James (voice))
- 2020: O2 (feature film; role: Colonel Saar)
- 2020: Rain (feature film; role: Kalju)
- 2023: The Invisible Fight (feature film; role: KGB agent)
- 2024: Beautiful Smile (short film; role: Alfred)
