= Saara Pius =

Estonian actress and singer

- Born: Saara Kadak; 20 September 1990 (age 35); Tallinn, then part of Estonian SSR, Soviet Union
- Occupations: Actress, singer
- Years active: 2006–present
- Spouse: Märt Pius
- Children: 2

Saara Pius (née Saara Kadak; born 20 September 1990), is an Estonian stage, film and television actress and singer.

== Early life and education ==
Saara Pius was born Saara Kadak in Tallinn and attended the primary schools at Katleri Primary School from 1997 until 2000 and the Audentese Private School from 2000 until 2006. Afterwards, she attended Tallinn 32 Secondary School, graduating in 2009. In 2009, she enrolled at the University of Tartu Viljandi Culture Academy's Department of Performing Arts, graduating in 2013.

== Career ==
=== Stage ===
Following her graduation from the Viljandi Culture Academy, Pius has appeared in a number of stage productions throughout Estonia, including the Rakvere Theatre, the Ugala Theatre, R.A.A.A.M Theatre, the Saaremaa Opera Festival, and the NUKU Theatre. Some of her more memorable stage roles include those in works by Tennessee Williams, Frank Wedekind, André Gide, Hans Christian Andersen, Victor Pelevin, August Gailit, and Antoine de Saint-Exupéry.

In 2008, Pius was part of the first Estonian improvisational theatre troupes, the Impro-Novas.

In 2018, Pius played the role of Belle in The Beauty And The Beast at Vanemuine Teater.

=== Film ===
Pius' first prominent film role was as Liisi in director Ilmar Raag's gritty 2007 feature film Klass for Estonian Culture Film. The film focused on rampant bullying which leads two teens to plan and commit a school shooting. Klass received awards from the Karlovy Vary International Film Festival and the Warsaw International Film Festival and was the official Estonian submission for the Best Foreign Language Film Category of the 80th Academy Awards, although it was not nominated.

In 2014, Pius played the role of Bianka in the Mihkel Ulk-directed drama Nullpunkt for Allfilm and Eesti Telefilm. The film also starred her future partner Märt Pius. In 2018, she appeared in a starring role as Ingrid in the Mikhail Pogosov-directed comedy film Lõbus perekond. In 2023, she appeared as Karin in the Ingomar Vihmar directed family comedy film Tähtsad ninad. She has also appeared in a number of short films.

=== Television ===
In 2010, Pius reprised her role of Liisi from Klass for Klass: elu pärast, a seven-part television miniseries that appeared on Estonia's ETV2 and followed up on the aftermath of the school shooting. She has since gone on to appear in roles as a regular or featured cast member in such Estonian television serials such as: Tuuliki Lepikson in the Eesti Televisioon (ETV) drama Alpimaja (2012), Mirjam in the ETV2 family/children's series Nähka tuleb külla (2014), Arabella Kotkas the Kanal 2 crime series Viimane võmm (2014–2016), Dea in the TV3 military drama Vabad mehed (2015), Eva in the Kanal 2 drama Restart (2015), and reprising her role as Arabella from Viimane võmm in the Kanal 2 crime series Siberi võmm (2016–present).

In 2015, Pius was a contestant on the fourth season TV3's Su nägu kõlab tuttavalt, the Estonian version of Your Face Sounds Familiar, an interactive reality television franchise series where celebrity contestants impersonate singers. Pius impersonations included Kate Bush, Johnny Rotten of the Sex Pistols, Linda Perry of 4 Non Blondes, Nicole Scherzinger of the Pussycat Dolls, Maria Callas, and Alanis Morissette, among others. Pius finished in second place, behind actor Juss Haasma. In 2018, she participated again and won the 7th season.

In 2024, she began appearing in the role of Laura in the Ergo Kuld directed TV3 drama Valetamisklubi.

=== Singer ===
Apart from acting, Pius has released several singles and a full-length album as a pop singer of electronic, ambient, and synth-pop music. Her first full-length album "Taevamenüü" was released in 2010. In 2017, she recorded the single "Mina jään ellu" with musician Jarek Kasar. In 2019, she performed the song "Storm" with Victor Crone at Eesti Laul, the annual music competition organized by Estonian public broadcaster Eesti Rahvusringhääling (ERR) to determine the Estonia's representative for the Eurovision Song Contest. However, due to her upcoming wedding, she was unable to travel to Tel Aviv with Crone to compete at the Eurovision Song Contest 2019.

== Personal life ==
Saara Kadak has been in a relationship with actor Märt Pius since 2015. In November 2016, the couple announced that they were expecting their first child. On 25 March 2017, Kadak gave birth to a daughter, Susanna. On 9 June 2019, Kadak and Pius married. She has since used her husband's surname personally and professionally. On 31 May 2020, Kadak gave birth to their second child, a son named Mihkel. The family currently resides in Tallinn.
