= Namuslu =

- Directed by: Ertem Egilmez
- Written by: Başar Sabuncu
- Starring: Şener Şen; Adile Naşit
- Release date: 1984
- Running time: 93 minutes
- Country: Turkey
- Language: Turkish

Namuslu is a 1984 Turkish drama film directed by Ertem Eğilmez.

== Cast ==
- Şener Şen - Ali Rıza Öğün
- Adile Naşit - Mother in law
- Ayşen Gruda - Naciye
- Erdal Özyağcılar - Mustafa
- Ergün Uçucu - Manager
- Zihni Küçümen - Müdür Necati
- Necati Bilgiç - Ergün
- Metin Çeliker - Remzi
- Tuncer Sevi - Çayci Hüseyin
- Bilge Zobu - Müteahhit
