= Priit Pius =

Estonian actor (born 1989)

- Born: 4 February 1989 (age 37); Tallinn, then part of Estonian SSR, Soviet Union
- Occupation: Actor
- Years active: 2010–present
- Spouse: Maiken Schmidt
- Children: 2
- Relatives: Märt Pius (twin brother)

Priit Pius (born 4 February 1989) is an Estonian stage, television, and film actor whose career began in the 2010s.

== Early life and education ==
Priit Pius was born in Tallinn to Jüri and Nelli Pius (née Paap). His twin brother is actor Märt Pius. He has one older brother, as well as two half-siblings from his father's previous marriage. He grew up in and attended schools in Tallinn before the family moved to the small village of Mällikvere in Jõgeva County, where he graduated from secondary school in 2008. Afterward, both he and his twin brother Märt enrolled in the Performing Arts Department of the Estonian Academy of Music and Theatre to study acting, graduating in 2012. Pius' diploma production roles were as Tuomas in Aleksis Kivi's Seven Brothers, Gerry Evans in Brian Friel's Dancing at Lughnasa, and as Tom Canty in Mark Twain's The Prince and the Pauper.

== Career ==
Following his graduation from the Estonian Academy of Music and Theatre, both Pius brothers began engagements at the Tallinn City Theatre in 2012 and are both still currently engaged at the theatre as actors. Among his more memorable roles in theater were in works by such varied authors and playwrights as: Florian Zeller, Eduard Bornhöhe, Anton Chekhov, Duncan Macmillan, Otfried Preußler, Marina Carr, Ferenc Molnár, Richard Greenberg, A. H. Tammsaare, Molière, Neil Simon, and Peter Barnes. He has also performed on several other theatre stages throughout Estonia.

Pius' began appearing in student films and short films in 2010. In 2014, he was cast, along with his brother Märt, as the Käär brothers in the Elmo Nüganen-directed war drama 1944 which was selected as the 2015 Estonian entry for the Best Foreign Language Film at the 88th Academy Awards but it was not nominated. In 2015, Pius had a starring role as Eero in the Urmas Eero Liiv-directed thriller Must alpinist for Kopli Kinokompanii. The film is loosely based on the events of the Dyatlov Pass incident of 2 February 1959, where nine ski hikers mysteriously died in the northern Ural Mountains after establishing a camp on the slopes of Kholat Syakhl. However, the film differs in many key ways from the original incident. In 2017, he appeared in two films; the Priit Pääsuke-directed drama Keti lõpp and the Andres Puustusmaa-directed comedy Rohelised kassid. In 2018, he appeared in the Anu Aun directed family-Christmas film Eia jõulud Tondikakul.

Priit Pius has also appeared as television actor, most notably in the role of Oliver in the 2015 Kanal 2 drama series Restart. In 2018, he began playing the role of Ricky Bamberg in the Kanal 2 television comedy series Alo, also featuring his brother Märt, playing the role of Martin Bamberg.

In 2021, Piius directed the six-part television drama series Süü.

== Personal life ==
Priit Pius married actress Maiken Schmidt in July 2019. They had a son on 22 March 2018. On 18 March 2020, they had a daughter.

Both Priit and Märt Pius have been diagnosed with Diabetes mellitus type 1 and speak openly about living with the condition in order to raise awareness of the illness.
