= Anne Reemann =

Estonian actress

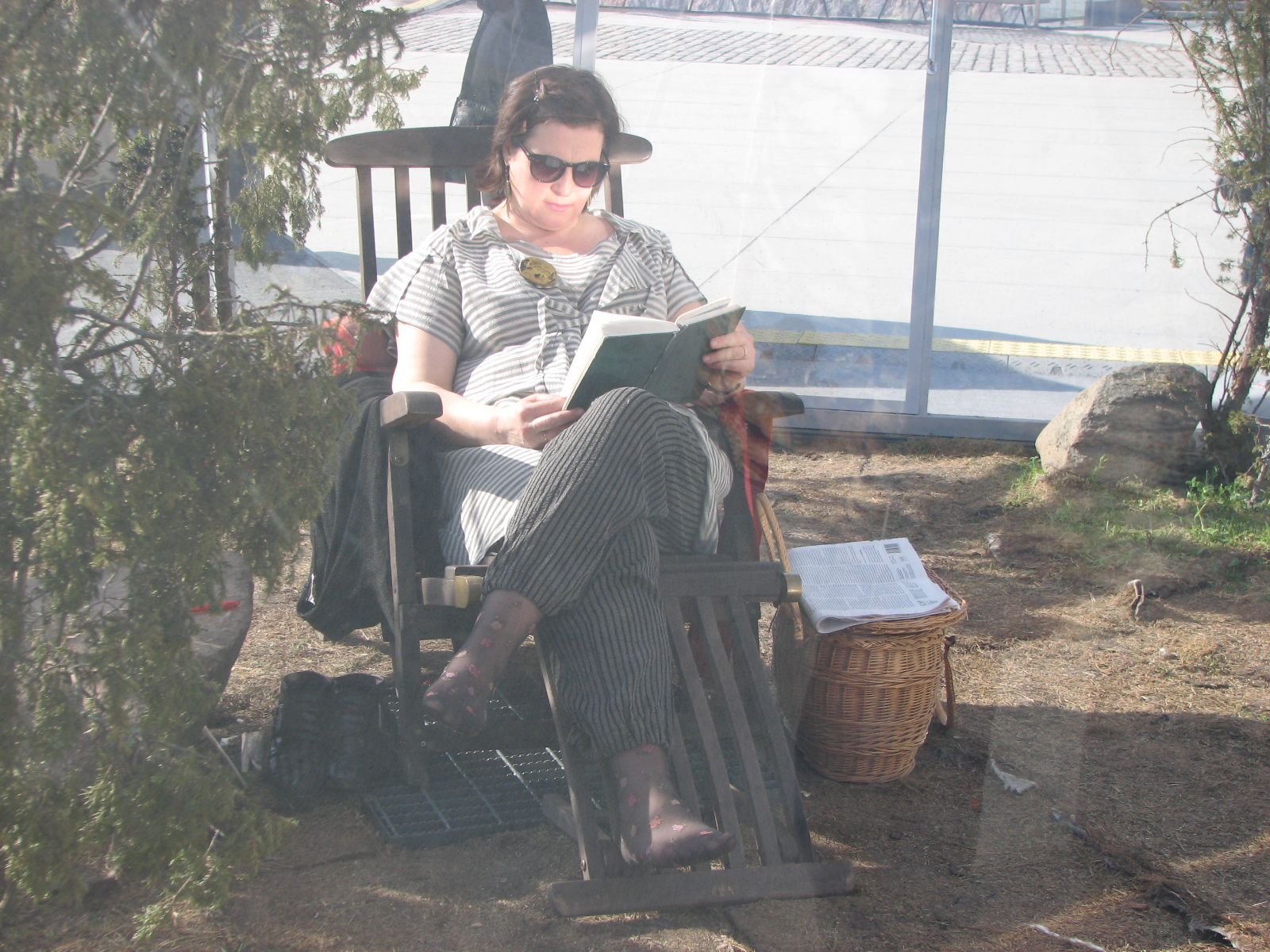
- Born: 30 December 1962 (age 63); Tallinn, then part of Estonian SSR, Soviet Union
- Occupation: Actress
- Years active: 1988–present
- Spouse: Elmo Nüganen
- Children: 3

Anne Reemann (born 30 December 1962) is an Estonian actress.

In 1988, Reemann graduated from the Estonian Academy of Music and Theatre. Since then, she has worked at the Tallinn City Theatre.

Reemann has acted in numerous movie productions, for example, Sügis.

== Personal life ==
Reemann is married to theatre director Elmo Nüganen. They have three daughters, Saara, Maria-Netti, and Sonja.
