= Tõnu Oja =

Estonian actor

Tõnu Oja (born 4 July 1958 in Tallinn) is an Estonian actor.

In 1980 he graduated from Estonian Academy of Music and Theatre. Since 2003 he has worked at the Estonian Drama Theatre. He has also played in films.

His elder brother is actor and director Rein Oja and his sons are actor Pääru Oja and deputy mayor Kaarel Oja.

== Selected filmography ==
- Sügis (1990)
- Täna öösel me ei maga (2004)
- Revolution of Pigs (2004)
- August 1991 (2005, television film)
- Lotte from Gadgetville (2006, voice)
- Tuulepealne maa (2009, television miniseries)
- Letters to Angel (2010)
- Lotte and the Moonstone Secret (2011, voice)
- A Friend of Mine (2011)
- Elavad pildid (2013)
- O2 (2020)
- Goodbye Soviet Union (2020)
