= Ohtla =

Village in Estonia

Coordinates: 58°52′N 23°55′E

- Village
- Interactive map of Ohtla
- Country: Estonia
- County: Lääne County
- Parish: Lääne-Nigula Parish
- Time zone: UTC+2 (EET)
  - Summer (DST): UTC+3 (EEST)

Ohtla is a village in Lääne-Nigula Parish, Lääne County, in western Estonia.
