= Märt Pius =

Estonian actor (born 1989)

- Born: 4 February 1989 (age 37); Tallinn, then part of Estonian SSR, Soviet Union
- Occupation: Actor
- Years active: 2010–present
- Spouse: Saara Kadak
- Children: 2
- Relatives: Priit Pius (twin brother)

Märt Pius (born 4 February 1989) is an Estonian stage, television, and film actor whose career began in the 2010s.

== Early life and education ==
Märt Pius was born in Tallinn to Jüri and Nelli Pius (née Paap). His twin brother is actor Priit Pius. He has one older brother, as well as two half-siblings from his father's previous marriage. He grew up in and attended schools in Tallinn before the family moved to the small village of Mällikvere in Jõgeva County, where he graduated from secondary school in 2008. Afterward, both he and his twin brother Priit enrolled in the Performing Arts Department of the Estonian Academy of Music and Theatre to study acting, graduating in 2012. Pius' diploma production roles included Edward Tudor in Mark Twain's The Prince and the Pauper and Aapo in Aleksis Kivi's Seven Brothers.

== Career ==
Following his graduation from the Estonian Academy of Music and Theatre, both Pius brothers began engagements at the Tallinn City Theatre in 2012 and are both still currently engaged at the theatre as actors. Among his more memorable roles in theater were in works by such varied authors and playwrights as: Annie Baker, Maxim Gorky, William Shakespeare, Otfried Preußler, John Steinbeck, Ferenc Molnár, Tom Stoppard, A. H. Tammsaare, Molière, Johanna Emanuelsson, Diana Leesalu, and Paavo Piik. He has also performed on several other theatre stages throughout Estonia.

Pius' began appearing in student films and short films in 2010. His first significant film role was that of Jacob in the 2013 René Vilbre-directed family-adventure film Väikelinna detektiivid ja valge daami saladus. This was followed by the starring role of Johannes in the gritty 2014 drama Nullpunkt opposite offscreen romantic partner Saara Kadak. In 2014, he was cast along with his brother Priit as the Käär brothers, in the Elmo Nüganen-directed war drama 1944 which was selected as the 2015 Estonian entry for the Best Foreign Language Film at the 88th Academy Awards but it was not nominated. In 2015, he appeared in the René Vilbre-directed comedy Klassikokkutulek. In 2017, he had a leading role as Ralf Tamm in the Jaak Kilmi-directed adventure-comedy Sangarid, about three Estonian youths who escape from behind the Iron Curtain to Sweden via Finland in the 1980s to experience life in the free world. The same year he appeared in the Andres Puustusmaa-directed comedy Rohelised kassid alongside his brother. In 2018, he appeared in the Anu Aun directed family-Christmas film Eia jõulud Tondikakul.

Pius has also appeared in Estonian television in a number of roles, including ETV2's Rula ja Ratas (2013) and Eesti Televisioon's (ETV) Aastavahetus Kinoteatriga (2015). In 2018, he began playing the role of Martin Bamberg in the Kanal 2 television comedy series Alo, also featuring his brother Priit, playing the role of Ricky Bamberg.

== Personal life ==
Märt Pius had been in a long-term relationship with actress Saara Kadak since 2015. On 9 June 2019, Pius and Kadak married. The couple have a daughter, born on 25 March 2017, and a son, born 31 May 2020. The family currently reside in Tallinn.

Both Märt and Priit Pius have been diagnosed with Diabetes mellitus type 1 and speak openly about living with the condition in order to raise awareness of the illness.
