= Maiken Pius =

Estonian actress (born 1985)

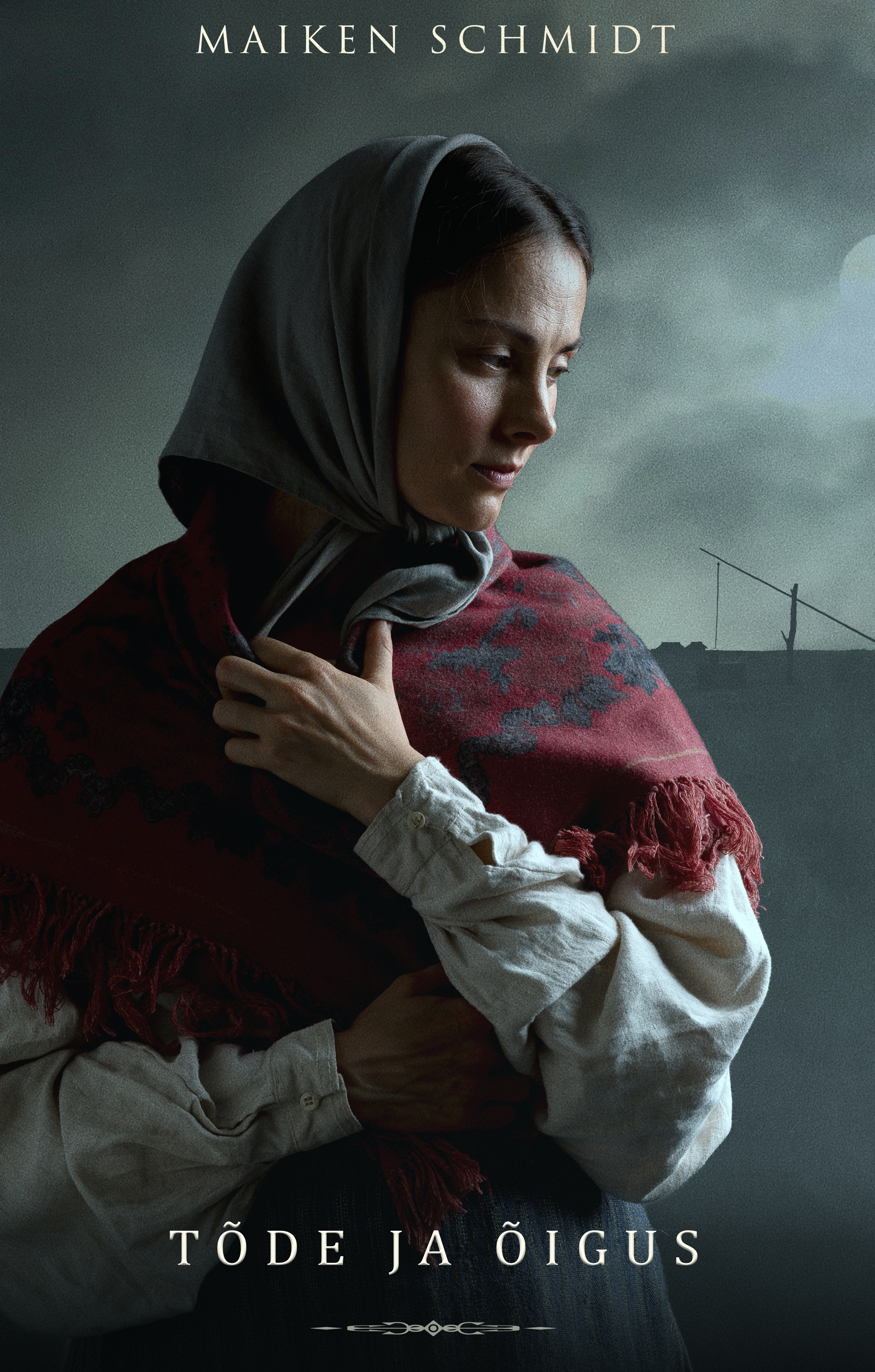
- Pius on a film poster for the 2019 film Truth and Justice
- Born: Maiken Schmidt; 17 April 1985 (age 41); Kilingi-Nõmme, then part of Estonian SSR, Soviet Union
- Occupation: Actress
- Years active: 2012–present
- Spouse: Priit Pius
- Children: 2

Maiken Pius (before 2019 Schmidt; born 17 April 1985) is an Estonian actress.

Maiken Pius was born Maiken Schmidt in Kilingi-Nõmme. She graduated from Kilingi-Nõmme Gymnasium in 2003. In 2006, she graduated from Tallinn University's choreography department, and in 2012, she graduated from the drama department of the Estonian Academy of Music and Theatre. Since 2012, she is an actress at Tallinn City Theatre. Besides theatrical roles, she has also played on movies and television series.

== Filmography ==
- 2010–2019 ENSV (television series; role: Kaire)
- 2015 1944 (feature film; role: Aino Tammik)
- 2017 Keti lõpp (feature film; role: servant)
- 2018 Mihkel (feature film; role: Veera)
- 2019 Truth and Justice (feature film; role: Krõõt)
- 2023 Mrs. Chatterjee vs. Norway (feature film; role: Maria Møller)
- 2023 Estonia (feature: TV-Series; role: Anu Vallner)
- 2026 Täiuslikud võõrad (feature film film; role: Eva)
