= Anu Aun =

Estonian film director, screenwriter and film producer

Anu Aun (born 14 February 1980 in Pärnu) is an Estonian film director, producer and scenarist.

In 2005-07, she worked at television production company OÜ Filmimees. In 2005, she founded (with Priit Pääsuke and Margo Siimon) the production company Luxfilm.

In 2023, Aun released "Vetelkõndija", a documentary about Estonian poet Kristiina Ehin. The film spent 10 years in production.

== Filmography ==
- 2007 "Indigo tuba" (feature film; director and producer)
- 2010 "Vahetus" (feature film; director and scenarist)
- 2016 "Polaarpoiss" (feature film; director and scenarist)
- 2018 "Eia jõulud Tondikakul" (feature film; director and scenarist)
- 2023: "Vetelkõndija" (documentary; director and producer)
