= Estonian Film Institute =

Organization based in Estonia

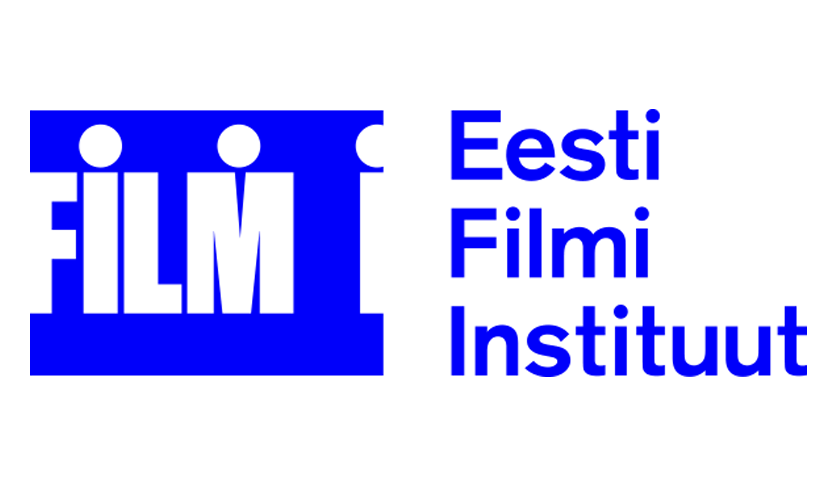
Logo

The Estonian Film Institute (Estonian: Eesti Filmi Instituut) is Estonia's public film funding organization financed from the state budget of the Republic of Estonia. Founded in 1997 by the Estonian Ministry of Culture, the foundation finances and promotes film productions where at least one of the participating producers is an independent Estonian production company. It establishes and develops international film contacts and supports the training of Estonian filmmakers and maintains the Estonian Film Database (EFIS).

Up until 2013 the institution was known as the Estonian Film Foundation (Estonian: Eesti Filmi Sihtasutus).

In December 2022 the organization released a new website in collaboration with the National Archives of Estonia called Arkaader. The aim of this project is to make the Estonian film heritage more available to both local and international audiences.

Estonia is a member of European Film Promotion, Media Plus, European Audiovisual Observatory, and Eurimages.

On 29 April 2022, the Estonian government announced that it raised Film Estonia’s 2022 cash-rebate budget from €2 million to €5.4 million with a net impact on the local economy of at least €8 million.
