= Elmo Nüganen =

Estonian actor and director of stage and film

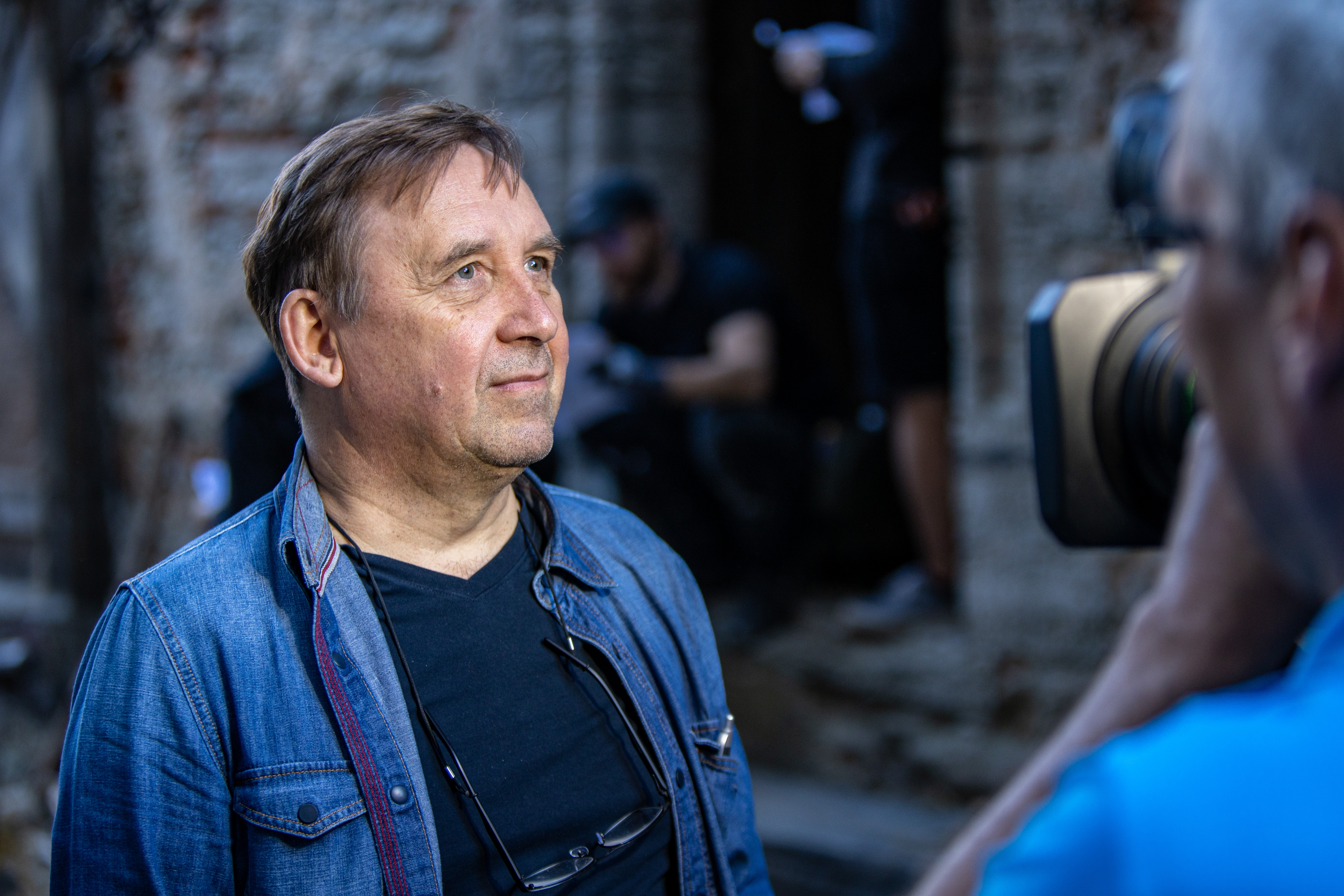
- Nüganen in 2020
- Born: 15 February 1962 (age 64); Jõhvi, then part of Estonian SSR, Soviet Union
- Occupations: Theatre director; film director; actor
- Years active: 1990 – present
- Notable work: Names in Marble; 1944
- Spouse: Anne Reemann
- Children: 3
- Awards: Estonian Annual Theatre Award for Best Director (1992, 1995, 2000, 2007, 2010); Estonian National Cultural Award (1996, 1999, 2009)

Elmo Nüganen (born 15 February 1962 in Jõhvi) is an Estonian theatre director, film director, and actor. He has been the artistic Director of the Tallinn City Theatre since 1992.

He was a graduate of the Estonian Academy of Music and Theatre in 1988 and then a professor at the academy from 1998–2002 and 2008–2012. He directed the war films Names in Marble from 2002 and 1944 from 2015. Names in Marble was seen by more than 168,000 people in Estonia and was selected for the 2003 Taormina Film Fest, while 1944 had the highest opening-week audience numbers in Estonian film history and became the country's submission for the Academy Awards.

Nüganen has received multiple awards for his work in theatre, including the Estonian Annual Theatre Award for Best Director in 1992, 1995, 2000, 2007, and 2010, and the Estonian National Cultural Award in 1996, 1999, and 2009.

== Personal life ==
Nüganen is of Ingrian Finnish descent. He is married to actress Anne Reemann. They have three daughters, Saara, Maria-Netti, and Sonja.

== Filmography ==
Director
Year	Title (Estonian)	Title (English)
2002	Nimed marmortahvlil	Names in Marble
2006	Meeletu	Mindless
2015	1944	
2022	Apteeker Melchior	Melchior the Apothecary
2022	Apteeker Melchior. Viirastus	Melchior the Apothecary: The Ghost
2022	Apteeker Melchior. Timuka tütar	Melchior the Apothecary: The Executioner's Daughter

Actor
Year	Title (Estonian)	Title (English)	Role
1990	Ainus pühapäev	The Only Sunday	Aleks
1990	Ainult hulludele ehk halastajaõde	Only For the Insane, or Sister of Mercy	Rhine Militia
1992	Mälestus sinistes kildudes. Bernard Kangro	A Memory in Blue Fragments. Bernard Kangro	Joonatan
1993	Suflöör	The Prompter	Robert
1993	Marraskuun harmaa valo	The Grey Light of November	
1994	Armastus kolme apelsini vastu	Love for Three Oranges	
1997	Kapsapea 2 ehk Tagasi Euroopasse	Cabbage Head 2, or Back to Europe	Voice
2002	Nimed marmortahvlil	Names in Marble	Armed Train Commander
2012	Seenelkäik	Mushrooming	Gas Station Salesman
2012	Puhastus	Purge	Father
2012	Deemonid	Demons	Stranger
2013	Mandariinid	Tangerines	Margus
2017	Lotte lood	Lotte's Stories	Lotte's Grandfather
2018	Portugal	The Boss	
2020	O2	Major Kurg	
2025	Ühemõõtmeline mees	One-Dimensional Man	Investigator
