= Tallinn City Theatre =

Theatre in Tallinn

Coordinates: 59.4399°N 24.7456°E

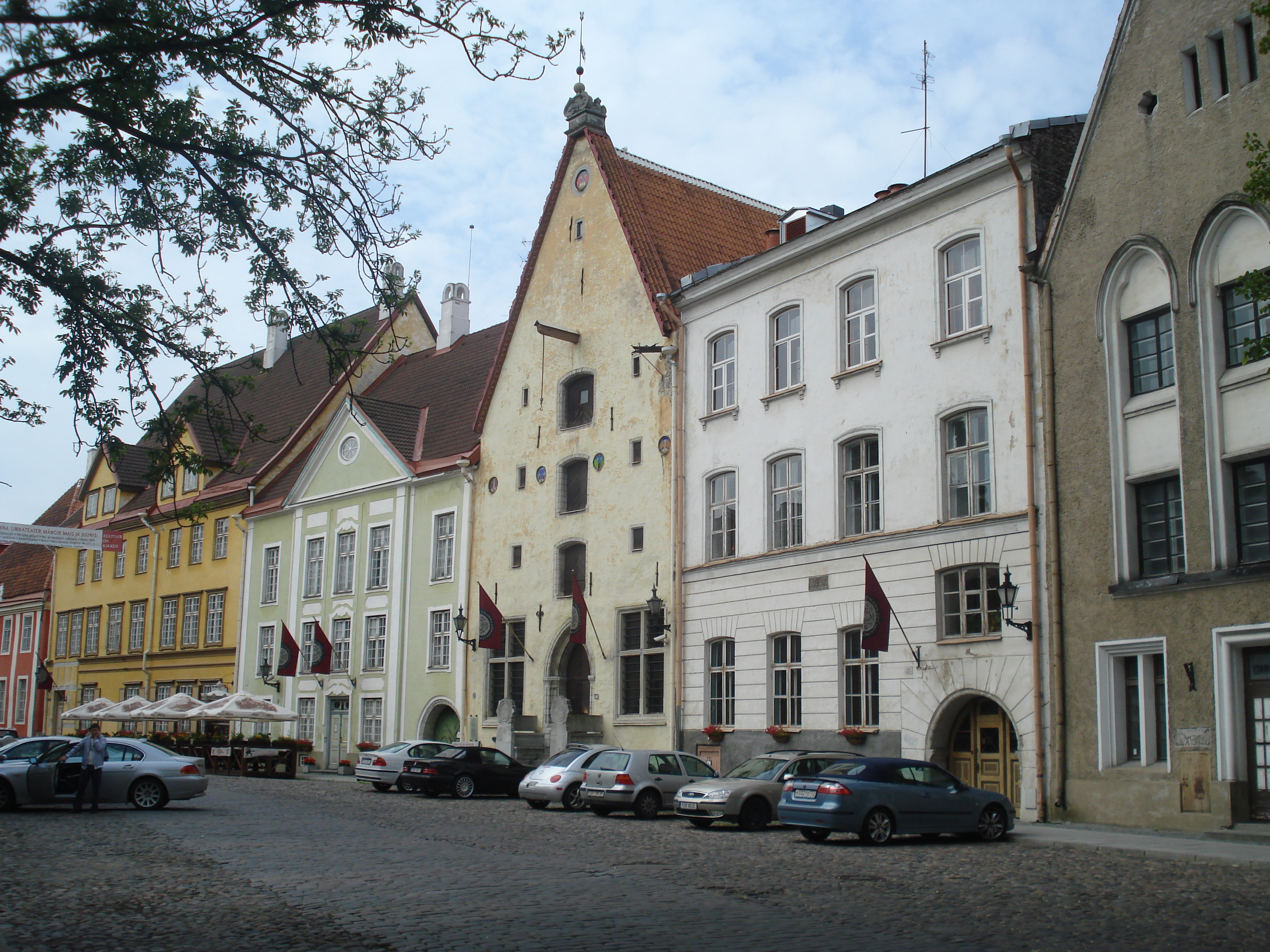
Tallinn City Theatre

Tallinn City Theatre (Estonian: Tallinna Linnateater) is a repertory theatre located in the medieval old town of Tallinn, Estonia. Tallinn City Theatre was established in 1965 as Estonian SSR State Youth Theatre. In 1992, after Estonia regained its independence, Elmo Nüganen became the artistic director, holding this position until today. In 1994, it became a municipal theatre named Tallinn City Theatre. Tallinn City Theatre's house is unique, consisting of 16 interconnected medieval merchant's houses. Tallinn City Theatre organizes a biannual international theatre festival Midwinter Night's Dream, which takes place in December.

The theatre, in common with all repertory theatres, hosts a wide range of theatrical performances

Tallinn City theatre also uses other theatre venues such as the Horse Mill near the main building and Salme Cultural Centre in Kalamaja.
