= Simeoni Sundja =

Estonian actor (born 1989)

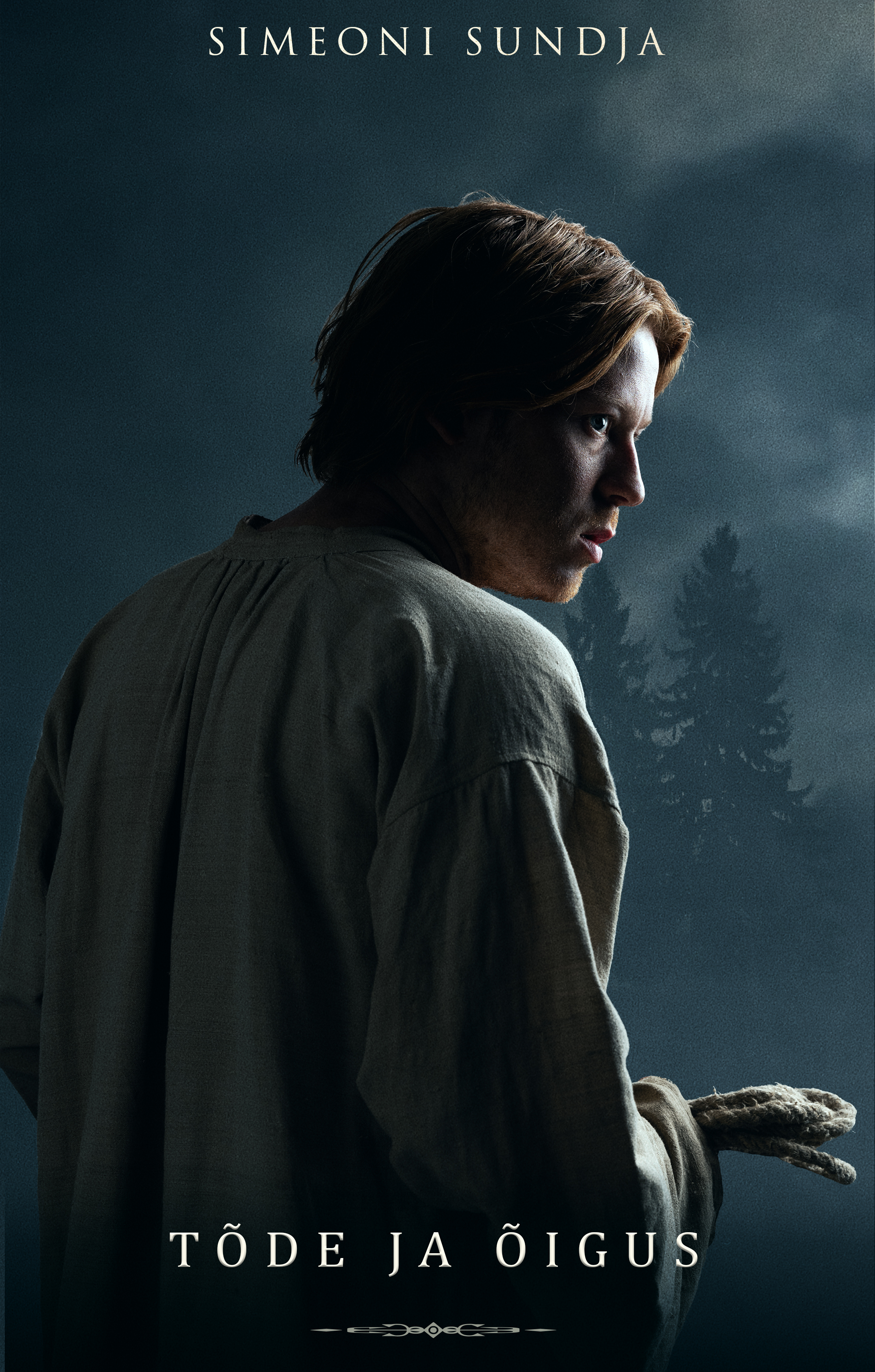
- Simeoni Sundja as the character Juss in the 2019 film Truth and Justice
- Born: 19 October 1989 (age 36); Tallinn, Estonia
- Occupation: Actor
- Years active: 2014–present
- Relatives: Ewert Sundja (brother)

Simeoni Sundja (born 19 October 1989) is an Estonian stage and film actor whose career began in 2014 following his graduation from the Estonian Academy of Music and Theatre with an engagement with the Theatre NO99, until its closing in 2018. Sundja has appeared in prominent roles in several notable films, including Truth and Justice (2019) and 8 Views of Lake Biwa (2024).

== Early life and education ==
Simeoni Sundja was born in Tallinn on 19 October 1989. His older brother Ewert is the vocalist and keyboardist for the indie-rock band Ewert and The Two Dragons.

Sundja attended schools in Tallinn, graduating from the Jakob Westholm Gymnasium in 2009. Afterward, he enrolled in the drama department of the Estonian Academy of Music and Theatre to study acting under instructor Tiit Ojasoo, graduating in 2014. Among his graduating classmates were actors Rea Lest, Jaanika Arum, Helena Pruuli, Reimo Sagor, Kärt Tammjärv, and Jörgen Liik.

== Career ==
In 2014, following his graduation from the Estonian Academy of Music and Theatre, Sundja began an engagement with the Theatre NO99 in Tallinn under direction of former Estonian Academy of Music and Theatre instructor Tiit Ojasoo. He remained with the theatre until its closing in 2018.

In 2019, Sundja appeared as Juss in the Tanel Toom directed epic Allfilm drama Truth and Justice; an adaptation of the first volume of the 1926–1933 social epic pentalogy of the same name by Estonian author A. H. Tammsaare. It was selected as the Estonian entry for the Best International Feature Film at the 92nd Academy Awards, making the December shortlist. It also received the 2019 Satellite Award for Best Foreign Language Film at the 24th Satellite Awards.

In 2021, he appeared in the Margot Schaap directed, Dutch-Estonian-Greek co-produced drama film Quicksand (Dutch: Drijfzand) as the character Luukas. This was followed by small roles in Melchior the Apothecary (2022) and Melchior The Apothecary. The Executioner's Daughter (2023).

In 2024, he had a starring role as Kiri in the Marko Raat directed drama 8 Views of Lake Biwa, followed by the roles of Peeter in the Rain Tolk and Andres Maimik directed drama Aurora and as Väino in the 2026 German Golub directed biographical sports drama Our Erika, which chronicled the career of Estonian track bicycle racer Erika Salumäe.

Simeoni Sundja has been a member of both Estonian Theatre Union and the Estonian Actors' Union since 2014.

== Awards ==
- 2016: Estonian Theatre Union Board Award, shared with director Tiit Ojasoo, director-artist Ene-Liis Semper, dramatist and playwright Eero Epner, producer Maret Kukkur, actors Rea Lest, Jörgen Liik, Helena Pruuli and Jarmo Reha as membere of the team of the production project "United Estonia".
