= Estonian Film and Television Awards =

Estonian awards

- Awarded for: Excellence in cinematic and television achievements
- Country: Estonia
- Presented by: Estonian Film Institute
- First award: 12 March 2017
- Website: http://filmi.ee/en/uudised

The Estonian Film and Television Awards (EFTA) are the national film industry awards that honor achievements in cinema and television. They were launched in 2017 and are organised by the Estonian Film Institute, the Ministry of Culture of the Republic of Estonia, the Cultural Endowment of Estonia and Eesti Media.

Two 21-person juries select nominees in 24 categories (12 for film, 12 for television respectively) whereas in a second voting round the winners are determined by both juries.

The first edition was held on 12 March 2017 and saw The Days that Confused winning the award for Best Picture. The second edition was held on 2 April 2018 with the film November dominating the film categories by winning Best Picture, director, Actress and five other awards. On September 2 2020 Truth and Justice was the first film that won in all the five major film categories picture, director, actor, actress and screenplay.

== Categories ==
=== Film ===
- Best Film
- Best Documentary
- Best Animated Film
- Best Short Film
- Best Director
- Best Actor
- Best Actress
- Best Screenplay
- Best Cinematography
- Best Score
- Best Production Design
- Best Editing
- Best Costume Design
- Best Achievement in Film Making Art

=== Television ===
- Best factual programme
- Best TV Series
- Best entertainment programme
- Best new programme
- Best special programme
- Best news coverage
- Best Actor in a TV Series
- Best Actress in a TV series
- Best Programme Host
- Best Programme Hostess
- Best Television Director
- Best Screenplay for a TV series
- Best Television content editor
- Best Television Cinematography

== Winners ==
=== 2017 ===
- Best Film: The Days that Confused
- Best Director: Triin Ruumet (The Days that Confused)
- Best Actor: Hendrik Toompere Jr. Jr. (The Days That Confused)
- Best Actress: Tiina Mälberg (Mother)
- Best TV Series: ESSR / ENSV
- Best TV Actor: Argo Aadli for ESSR / ENSV
- Best TV Actress: Helene Vannari for ESSR / ENSV

=== 2018 ===
- Best Film: November
- Best Director: Rainer Sarnet (November)
- Best Actor: Tõnu Kark (Green Cats)
- Best Actress: Rea Lest (November)
- Best TV Series: Siberi Võmm
- Best TV Actor: Mait Malmsten for ESSR / ENSV
- Best TV Actress: Luule Komissarov for Õnne 13

=== 2019 ===
- Best Film: The Little Comrade
- Best Director: Moonika Siimets (The Little Comrade)
- Best Actor: Reimo Sagor (Take It or Leave It)
- Best Actress: Ingrid Isotamm (Fire Lily)
- Best TV Series: Litsid
- Best TV Actor: Priit Võigemast for Alo
- Best TV Actress: Laine Mägi for ESSR / ENSV

=== 2020 ===
- Best Film: Truth and Justice
- Best Director: Tanel Toom (Truth and Justice)
- Best Actor: Priit Loog (Truth and Justice)
- Best Actress: Ester Kuntu (Truth and Justice)
- Best TV Series: Lahutus Eesti moodi
- Best TV Actor/Actress: Tambet Tuisk for Reetur
