= List of Estonian submissions for the Academy Award for Best International Feature Film =

Estonian films for Academy Award

Best International Feature Film submissions from Estonia

Highlights
- Debut: 1992
- Submissions: 24
- Nominations: 1
- Oscar winners: none

Estonia has submitted films for the Academy Award for Best International Feature Film (Note: The category was previously named the Academy Award for Best Foreign Language Film, but this was changed to the Academy Award for Best International Feature Film in April 2019, after the Academy deemed the word "Foreign" to be outdated.) since 1992. The award is handed out annually by the United States Academy of Motion Picture Arts and Sciences to a feature-length motion picture produced outside the United States that contains primarily non-English dialogue. It was not created until the 1956 Academy Awards, in which a competitive Academy Award of Merit, known as the Best Foreign Language Film Award, was created for non-English speaking films, and has been given annually since.

As of 2026, Estonia was nominated only once, for Tangerines (2014).

== Submissions ==
The Academy of Motion Picture Arts and Sciences has invited the film industries of various countries to submit their best film for the Academy Award for Best International Feature Film since 1956. The International Feature Film Committee oversees the process and reviews all the submitted films. Following this, they vote via secret ballot to determine the five nominees for the award.

Tangerines (2014), directed by Zaza Urushadze, was the country first nominated film at the 87th Academy Awards.

Truth and Justice (2019), directed by Tanel Toom, advanced to the December shortlists, but was not nominated.

All submissions were primarily in Estonian. Below is a list of the films that have been submitted by Estonia for review by the Academy for the award by year and the respective Academy Awards ceremony.

Year (Ceremony)	Film title used in nomination	Original title	Director	Result
1992 (65th)	Those Old Love Letters	Need vanad armastuskirjad	Mati Põldre	Not nominated
2001 (74th)	The Heart of the Bear	Karu süda	Arvo Iho	Not nominated
2004 (77th)	Revolution of Pigs	Sigade revolutsioon	Jaak Kilmi, René Reinumägi	Not nominated
2005 (78th)	Shop of Dreams	Stiilipidu	Peeter Urbla	Not nominated
2007 (80th)	The Class	Klass	Ilmar Raag	Not nominated
2008 (81st)	I Was Here	Mina olin siin	René Vilbre	Not nominated
2009 (82nd)	December Heat	Detsembrikuumus	Asko Kase	Not nominated
2010 (83rd)	The Temptation of St. Tony	Püha Tõnu kiusamine	Veiko Õunpuu	Not nominated
2011 (84th)	Letters to Angel	Kirjad Inglile	Sulev Keedus	Not nominated
2012 (85th)	Mushrooming	Seenelkäik	Toomas Hussar	Not nominated
2013 (86th)	Free Range	Free Range: Ballaad maailma heakskiitmisest	Veiko Õunpuu	Not nominated
2014 (87th)	Tangerines	Mandariinid / მანდარინები	Zaza Urushadze	Nominated
2015 (88th)	1944		Elmo Nüganen	Not nominated
2016 (89th)	Mother	Ema	Kadri Kõusaar	Not nominated
2017 (90th)	November		Rainer Sarnet	Not nominated
2018 (91st)	Take It or Leave It	Võta või jäta	Liina Triškina-Vanhatalo	Not nominated
2019 (92nd)	Truth and Justice	Tõde ja õigus	Tanel Toom	Made shortlist
2020 (93rd)	The Last Ones	Viimased	Veiko Õunpuu	Not nominated
2021 (94th)	On the Water	Vee peal	Peeter Simm	Not nominated
2022 (95th)	Kalev		Ove Musting	Not nominated
2023 (96th)	Smoke Sauna Sisterhood	Savvusanna sõsarad	Anna Hints	Not nominated
2024 (97th)	8 Views of Lake Biwa	Biwa järve 8 nägu	Marko Raat	Not nominated
2025 (98th)	Rolling Papers	Pikad paberid	Meel Paliale	Not nominated
2026 (99th)	Our Erika	Meie Erika	German Golub	Pending

== See also ==
- List of Academy Award winners and nominees for Best International Feature Film
- List of Academy Award-winning foreign language films
- Cinema of Estonia
