= Vahtre =

Vahtre is an Estonian surname. Notable people with the surname include:

- Lauri Vahtre (born 1960), Estonian politician, historian, translator, and writer
- Sulev Vahtre (1926–2007), Estonian historian
