= Liik =

Family name

Origin
- Language: Estonian
- Meaning: "kind", "sort", "type", "species"
- Region of origin: Estonia

Liik is an Estonian surname meaning: "[a] kind [of]", "sort", "type", and "species".

As of 1 January 2022, 121 men and 136 women in Estonia have the surname Liik. Liik is ranked as the 629th most common surname for men in Estonia, and 606th for women. The surname Liik is most common in Saare County, where 6.84 per 10,000 inhabitants of the county bear the surname.

Notable people bearing the surname Liik include:

- Elmar Liik (1895–1975), agronomist
- Jörgen Liik (1990–2025), actor
- Kadri Liik (born 1970), journalist and political analyst
- Kallistrat Liik (1908–1974), microbiologist
- Marianna Liik (born 1992), composer
- Oskar Liik (1886–1938), physician and Estonian Defence Forces colonel
- Rea Lest-Liik (born 1990), actress
- Verner Liik (1897–1958), politician
