= Karin Tammaru =

Estonian actress

- Born: 27 January 1971 (age 55); Paide, then part of Estonian SSR, Soviet Union
- Other name: Karin Tammaru-Taalmaa
- Occupation: Actress
- Years active: 1996–present
- Partner: Indrek Taalmaa
- Children: 2

Karin Tammaru (born 27 January 1971) is an Estonian stage, television and film actress.

== Early life and education ==
Karin Tammaru was born in Paide, in Järva County to Leonhard-Heinrich Tammaru and Linda Tammaru (née Dröner). She has one sister. She studied at Tallinn 7th School between 1976 and 1986. Afterward, she attended secondary school at the Jakob Westholm Gymnasium, studying music, from 1986, until graduating in 1989. After graduating from secondary school, she studied at Tallinn Pedagogical Institute (now, Tallinn University) from 1990 until 1992 before continuing her studies at EMA Higher Drama School (now, the Estonian Academy of Music and Theatre) in Tallinn, graduating in 1996. Among her graduating classmates were Taavi Eelmaa, Ain Prosa, René Reinumägi, Indrek Saar, Tarvo Sõmer, and Ardo Ran Varres.

== Stage career ==
In 1996, shortly after her graduation from EMA Higher Drama School, Tammaru began an engagement as an actress at the Rakvere Theatre. She would remain at the Rakvere Theatre for two years, leaving in 1998 to join the Vanemuine theatre in Tartu. This would be Tammaru's longest engagement; lasting eight years before leaving in 2006. Following her departure from the Vanemuine, she joined the Endla Theatre in Pärnu, where she is currently engaged.

Some of her most notable performances at the Endla Theatre include roles in such works by authors and playwrights as: Kaite O'Reilly, Urmas Vadi, Anton Chekhov, Maurice Maeterlinck, William Gibson, Donald Bisset, Ervin Õunapuu, Wajdi Mouawad, Bengt Ahlfors, Sacha Lichy, Andrus Kivirähk, Gustave Flaubert, Joanna Owsianko, Tiit Palu, and Nikolai Gogol, among others.

== Television and film ==
Tammaru's first film role was as a voice actress and narrator for the 1996 Priit Tender directed short animated Estonian film Gravitatsioon for Eesti Joonisfilm. This was followed by the role of Milvi in the 2009 Andrus Tuisk directed dramatic feature film Pangarööv for Filmivabrik. In 2011, she appeared as Director Jaaksoo in the Katrin Laur directed Estinfilm drama Surnuaiavahi tütar, about the disintegration of a rural family. In 2014, she had a small role as a mother in the film short Lõunavalgus, directed by Kairit Krass. This was followed by the role of Gert's mother in the 2022 period-drama Kalev, directed by Ove Musting.

Apart from films, Karin Tammaru has also appeared in a number of television productions. In 2006, she made an appearance on the Eesti Televisioon (ETV) crime drama series Ohtlik lend. The same year, she played the role of Natasha in the Tapio Piirainen directed Finnish feature-length television crime-drama film Bodomin legenda for Yleisradio (YLE).

Other television appearances include the role of Maia on two episodes of the Kanal 2 crime-drama series Kelgukoerad in 2010; as a teacher on the ETV political satire series Riigimehed in 2013; a 2014 role on the Kanal 2 crime-drama series Viimane võmm; and several characters on the popular TV3 comedy-crime series Kättemaksukontor between 2009 and 2015.

In 2023 he played the role of a Marine Corporal in Last Sentinel directed by Tanel Toom.

== Personal life ==
Karin Tammaru is in a long-term relationship with actor Indrek Taalmaa. The couple have two sons and reside in Tallinn.
