= Truth and Justice (2019 film) =

2019 film

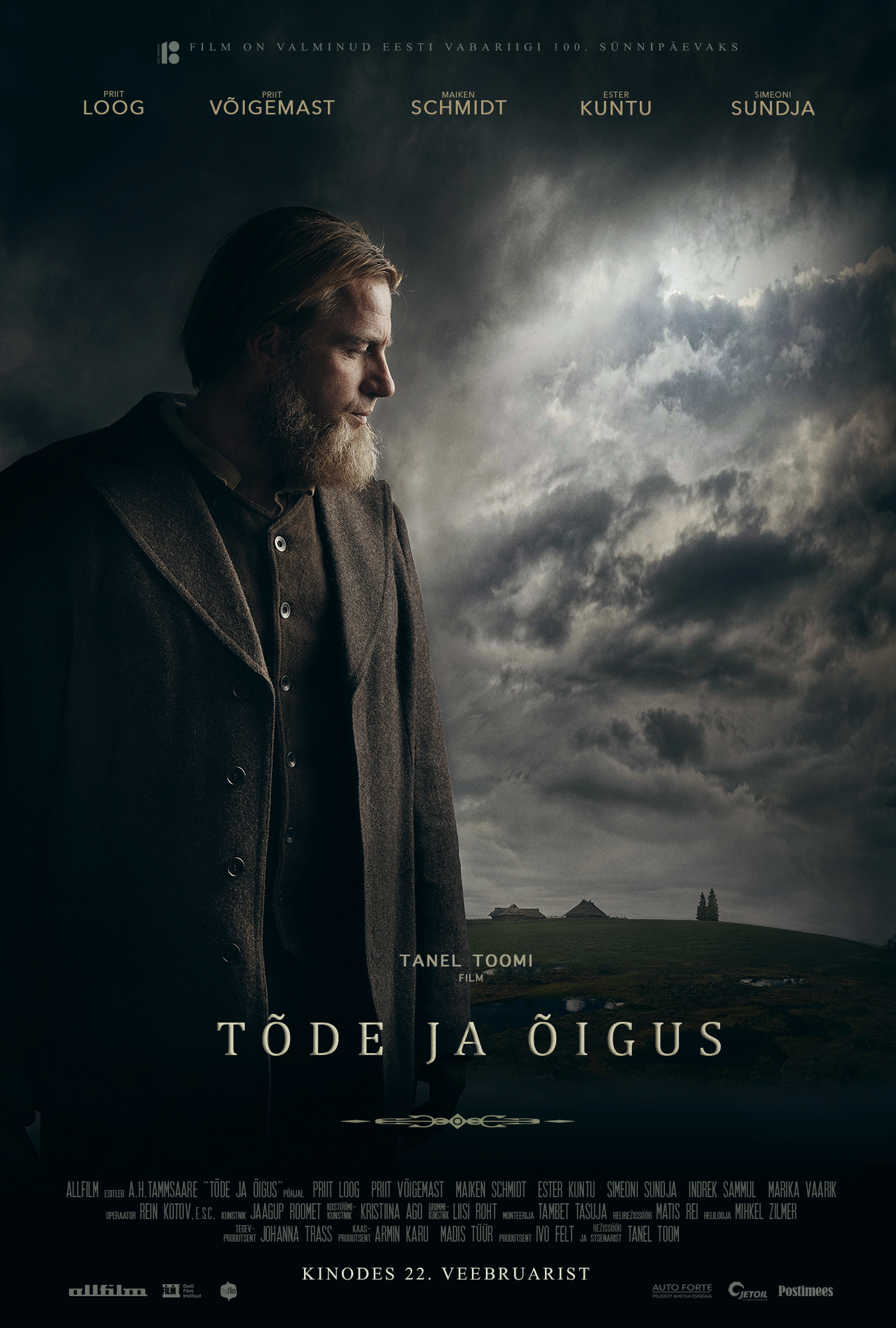
- Film poster
- Directed by: Tanel Toom
- Written by: Tanel Toom
- Produced by: Ivo Felt
- Starring: Priit Loog; Priit Võigemast
- Cinematography: Rein Kotov
- Edited by: Tambet Tasuja
- Music by: Mihkel Zilmer
- Distributed by: Allfilm
- Release date: 22 February 2019
- Running time: 165 minutes
- Country: Estonia
- Language: Estonian

Truth and Justice (Estonian: Tõde ja õigus) is a 2019 Estonian epic drama film directed by Tanel Toom. The film is an adaptation of the first volume of the 1926–1933 social epic pentalogy of the same name by Estonian author A. H. Tammsaare.

It was selected as the Estonian entry for the Best International Feature Film at the 92nd Academy Awards, making the December shortlist. It received Satellite Award for Best Foreign Language Film, making it the second Estonian film to do so after Tangerines.

The film had a budget of 2.5 million euros and made a box office of 1.55 million euros. It is the most-watched film in Estonian cinemas since Estonia regained its independence. Estonian film journalists selected it as the best Estonian film in 2019.

== Plot ==
In 1870, the new farm owner of Robber's Rise struggles against a rival neighbour as well as his own family and beliefs.

== Cast ==
- Priit Loog as Andres
- Priit Võigemast as Pearu
- Ester Kuntu as Mari
- Maiken Schmidt as Krõõt
- Risto Vaidla as Young Andres
- Loora-Eliise Kaarelson as Maret
- Indrek Sammul as Sauna-Madis
- Marika Vaarik as Madis' wife
- Simeoni Sundja as Juss
- Liisa Aibel as Lambasihver

== Critical reception ==
The film received widespread critical acclaim from local critics. Writing for Delfi, Ragnar Novod noted that "Truth and Justice is exactly created in the style of world cinema and even the most Estonian-distant person can enjoy film with a calm hearth and without knowing anything about Tammsaare's novels or its meaning on our cultural history. Themes covered in film are universal and therefore I do not find any reason why the film should not be distributed to as far as possible and maybe even be taken into Oscars."

== See also ==
- List of submissions to the 92nd Academy Awards for Best International Feature Film
- List of Estonian submissions for the Academy Award for Best International Feature Film
