= Tammjärv =

Family name

Tammjärv is an Estonian surname. Notable people with the surname include:

- Karel Tammjärv (born 1989), Estonian cross-country skier
- Kärt Tammjärv (born 1991), Estonian actress
