= Rolling Papers =

Rolling Papers may refer to:

- Rolling paper, small sheets, rolls, or leaves of paper which are sold for rolling one's own cigarettes
- Rolling Papers (album), the debut studio album of Wiz Khalifa
- Rolling Papers (mixtape), the debut mixtape of Domo Genesis
- Rolling Papers (2015 film), a documentary about The Denver Post's coverage of newly legal recreational marijuana
- Rolling Papers (2024 film), an Estonian comedy-drama film
