= Take It or Leave It (2018 film) =

2018 film

- Film poster
- Directed by: Liina Triškina-Vanhatalo
- Written by: Liina Triškina-Vanhatalo
- Produced by: Ivo Felt
- Starring: Reimo Sagor; Liis Lass
- Release date: 14 September 2018
- Running time: 102 minutes
- Country: Estonia
- Language: Estonian

Take It or Leave It (Estonian: Võta või jäta) is a 2018 Estonian drama film directed by Liina Triškina-Vanhatalo. It was selected as the Estonian entry for the Best Foreign Language Film at the 91st Academy Awards, but it was not nominated.

== Plot ==
Erik, a 30-year-old construction worker, receives a surprise visit from his ex-girlfriend. Unready to be a mother to their newborn daughter, she asks him to take full custody or she will put the child up for adoption.

== Cast ==
- Reimo Sagor - Erik
- Liis Lass - Moonika
- Epp Eespäev - Evi (Erik's Mother)
- Egon Nuter - Mati (Erik's Father)
- Viire Valdma - Imbi (Moonika's Mother)
- Nora Altrov - Mai (baby)
- Emily Viikman- Mai (age 3)
- Adeele Sepp - Katrin
- Andres Mähar - Sven
- Eva Koldits - Liisu
- Indrek Ojari - Toomas
- Kristjan Lüüs - Marko
- Steffi Pähn - Evelin
- Jane Napp - Mia
- Albert Tiigirand - Otto
- Marin Mägi-Efert - Jaana
- Edi Edgar Talimaa - Kaspar
- Mait Malmsten - Boss
- Priit Võigemast - Lawyer
- Hilje Murel - Pediatrician
- Helena Merzin - Social Worker
- Marika Vaarik - Judge
- Terje Pennie - Midwife

== See also ==
- List of submissions to the 91st Academy Awards for Best Foreign Language Film
- List of Estonian submissions for the Academy Award for Best Foreign Language Film
