= Priit Loog =

Estonian actor (born 1984)

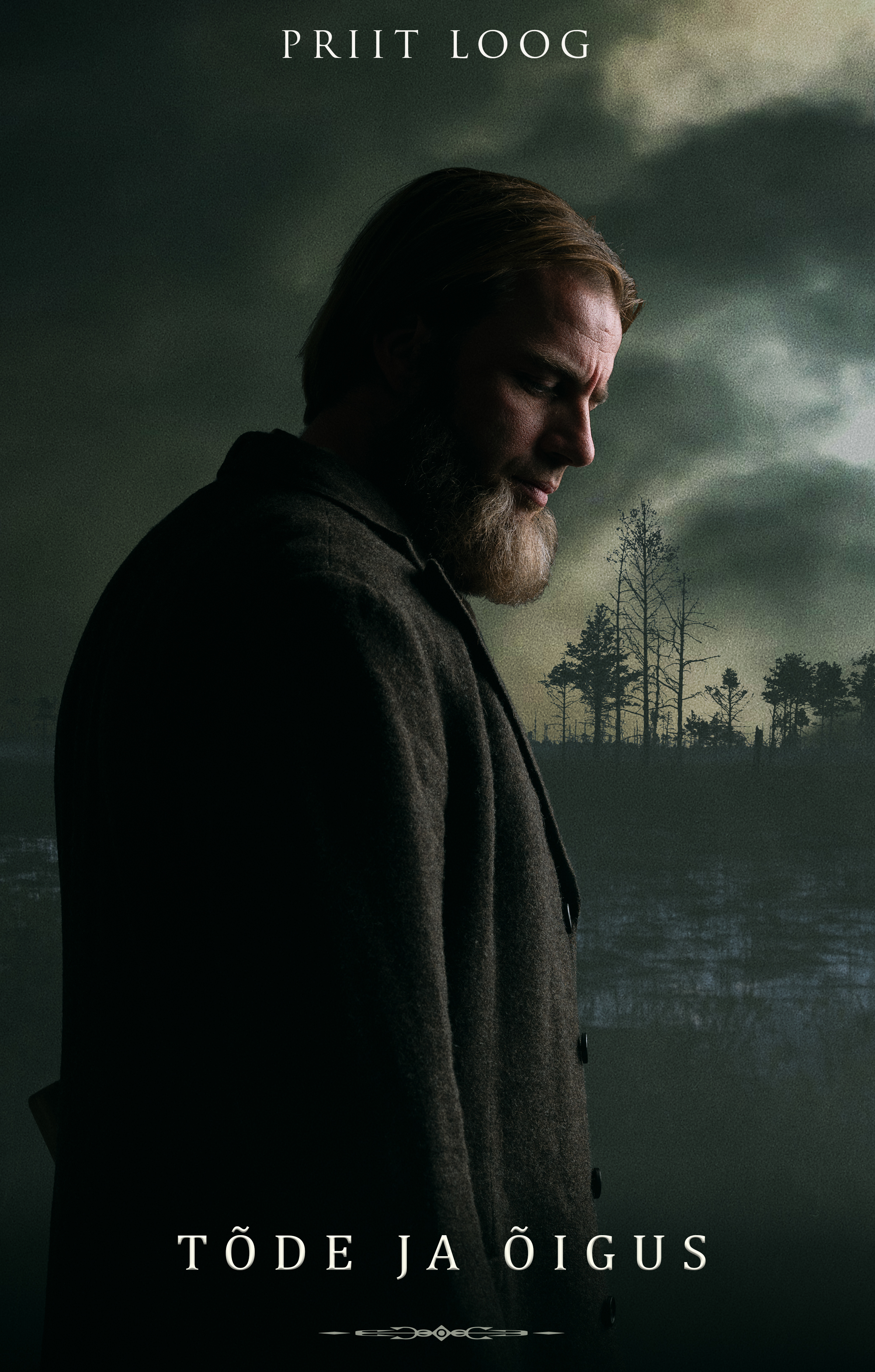
- Loog as the character Andres in the 2019 film Truth and Justice
- Born: 6 January 1984 (age 42); Viljandi, then part of Estonian SSR, Soviet Union
- Occupation: Actor
- Years active: 2006–present
- Children: 1

Priit Loog (born 6 January 1984) is an Estonian stage, television and film actor.

== Early life and education ==
Priit Loog was born in Viljandi in 1984. He attended primary and secondary schools in Viljandi before studying theatre at the University of Tartu Viljandi Culture Academy in Viljandi, graduating in 2007.

== Stage career ==
Following graduation, he became engaged at the Endla Theatre in Pärnu in 2007, where he is still currently employed. Loog has appeared in over thirty productions to date during his engagement at the Endla. Some of his most memorable roles at the Endla include those in stage productions by such varied international playwrights and authors as: Tom Stoppard, Astrid Lindgren, Gustave Flaubert, Wajdi Mouawad, Luigi Pirandello, Jane Austen, Maurice Maeterlinck, Georg Buchner, Peter Quilter, Tennessee Williams, and J. M. Barrie. Among his more memorable performances at the Endla in roles by Estonian playwrights and authors include those of: Karl Ristikivi, Urmas Vadi, Tiit Palu, Kalju Kangur, Andrus Kivirähk, Gerda Kordemets, Mart Kivastik, and Triinu Ojalo.

Loog has won the Endla Audience Favorite Award in 2011, 2013, and 2015 and the Colleague Award in 2010 and 2015.

== Film and television ==
Loog made his feature film debut in a small role in the 2006 Oleg Fesenko directed Russian-Estonian horror film Vedma (English release title: The Power of Fear). This was followed by another small role in the 2008 Asko Kase directed Estonian historical drama Detsembrikuumus. Loog's first substantial film role came in the 2012 in the role of Tõnn in the Andres Kõpper and Arun Tamm directed crime-comedy Vasaku jala reede, for Tallinn Skyline Productions. In 2015, he appeared in the role of Paul Mets in the Elmo Nüganen directed World War II period drama 1944, which depicted the war through the eyes of Estonian soldiers having to choose sides and thus fight against their fellow countrymen. In 2015, it was announced that Loog would appear as Andres in a Tanel Toom directed film Tõde ja õigus, an adaptation of A. H. Tammsaare's sweeping social epic pentalogy of the same name. The film began production in late 2016 and was released in February 2019 and Loog subsequently won the Best Actor award at the 2020 Estonian Film and Television Awards for his role in the film.

Priit Loog made his television debut as the character Richard Rõõmus in the Eesti Televisioon's (ETV) Tuulepealne maa; a twelve-part mini-series chronicling Estonia's history from the Estonian War of Independence, post-war life throughout the 1920s up until 1940, and World War II. In 2009, he was a regular performer on the TV3 improvisational comedy sketch comedy series Vilde tee. From 2010 until 2013, he played the role of Paul Moorits on the popular Kanal 2 drama series Pilvede all. He has also made several appearances in different roles between 2010 and 2014 on the TV3 crime-comedy Kättemaksukontor.

In 2021, he appeared in the role of Peeter in the Ergo Kuld directed comedy film Jahihooaeg alongside Harriet Toompere, Mirtel Pohla and Grete Kuld.

In 2026, he appeared as Ants Antson in German Golub directed biographical sports drama Our Erika, which chronicled the career of Estonian track bicycle racer Erika Salumäe.

== Personal life ==
Priit Loog currently resides in Pärnu. He is in a long-term relationship and has one daughter. He is an avid amateur photographer and fisherman.
