= Raivo Trass =

Estonian actor and theatre director (1946–2022)

Raivo Trass (12 March 1946 – 7 June 2022) was an Estonian actor, director and theatrical pedagogue.

== Career ==
Trass graduated from the Tallinn State Conservatory's Performing Arts Department in 1968. From 1968 until 1977, he was an actor at Estonian Drama Theatre. From 1977 until 1985, he was the chief stage manager of the Rakvere Theatre. From 1981 until 1985, he was the head of Rakvere Theatre. From 1985 until 1992, he was a director at Estonian Drama Theatre. From 1997 until 2004, he was the chief stage manager of Endla Theatre.

Trass' first big movie role was Hans von Risbieter in the Estonian classic Viimne reliikvia (The Last Relic) in 1969. Trass also appeared in Zaza Urushadze's Tangerines (2013), Anders Thomas Jensen's Riders of Justice (2020), and Taneli Mustonen's The Twin (2022).

== Awards ==
- 1975: Ants Lauter Prize
- 1983: Meritorious Artist of the Estonian SSR
- 2001: Order of the White Star, IV class.

== Selected filmography ==
- 1969: Viimne reliikvia – Hans von Risbieter
- 1982: Arabella, mereröövli tütar – Manuel
- 1991: Vana mees tahab koju – Albert Valter
- 1991: Surmatants – Diederek von Katwijk
- 1999: Kass kukub käppadele – Ernesto
- 2006: Vana daami visiit – Linnapea
- 2010: Riigimehed –
- 2012: Vasaku jala reede – Veteran
- 2013: Mandariinid – Juhan
- 2018: Tuliliilia – Heimar
- 2020: Riders of Justice – Orthodox priest
- 2022: The Twin – Old Man
- 2022: Apteeker Melchior. Viirastus – Goswin
- 2023: Taevatrepp – Georg
