= Last Sentinel =

American science fiction action film

- Directed by: Tanel Toom
- Written by: Malachi Smith
- Produced by: Jörg Bundschuh; Pippa Cross; Ivo Felt; Ben Pullen; Matthew James Wilkinson
- Starring: Kate Bosworth; Lucien Laviscount; Martin McCann; Thomas Kretschmann
- Cinematography: Mart Ratassepp
- Edited by: Tambet Tasuja
- Music by: Gert Wilden Jnr
- Production companies: Allfilm; BR/ARTE; Crossday Productions; Head Gear Films; Kick Film; Stigma Films; Tallifornia
- Distributed by: Vertical Studios; Altitude Film Distribution
- Release date: March 24, 2023; (United States)
- Running time: 117 minutes
- Countries: Germany; Estonia; United Kingdom
- Language: English

Last Sentinel (also known as Last Contact in some territories) is a 2023 science fiction thriller film starring Kate Bosworth and Lucien Laviscount. It is directed by Tanel Toom and written by Malachi Smyth.

== Plot ==
After rising sea levels cause most of Earth's landmass to become submerged, only two small continents remain, locked in war. The southern continent controls Sentinel, a sea outpost between them. A four person crew consisting of Sergeant Hendrichs, their squad leader; Cassidy, a corporal; Baines, the mechanic; and Sullivan, a fisherman and cook. They signed on for two years, but their relief is three months late. As tensions rise, Sullivan loses his catch during a powerful storm, angering Baines. Sullivan, in turn, lashes out at Baines for Sentinel's poor state.

Soon afterward a ship appears on the radar. When it does not answer Cassidy's communication attempts, Hendrichs sends Sullivan to investigate. Sullivan turns off his radio while searching the ship, causing Hendrichs to worry that it is an enemy invasion. As Hendrichs prepares to fire a doomsday weapon, Sullivan finally responds and says it is harmless and adrift. Sullivan tows it back to Sentinel and suggests radioing it in. Hendrichs refuses until he has more information. Sullivan and Cassidy, who are in a secret relationship, have sex when Sullivan returns.

Baines and Sullivan share a bottle of alcohol and discuss the other continent. Baines says his wife suspects that the enemy has either died or was defeated years ago, and their government has suppressed this information to justify its rule. Increasingly frustrated with Hendrichs' decisions, Sullivan sends a message back to their command without Hendrichs' approval. The crew is demoralized when the response simply repeats their own message back to them. Hendrichs demands that they remain focused, but the others wonder if both sides have perished.

Sullivan learns that Baines has been sneaking out to fix the adrift ship. Baines suggests they use it to leave the outpost. Sullivan eagerly agrees, but Cassidy appears noncommittal when he invites her to join them. Hendrichs catches Baines and Sullivan celebrating when they finish the repairs and orders them to sink the ship. After a tense standoff, Cassidy offers to mediate the dispute. Hendrichs relents and allows Sullivan and Baines to leave for supplies and a relief crew, but he says Cassidy must remain behind to help defend Sentinel.

Sullivan refuses to leave without Cassidy, but she says she does not love him and has been using him for sex. Before they can leave, another ship shows up on the radar. Hendrichs demands they immediately destroy it, but Baines refuses when he realizes it is the ship he fixed, once again adrift. To save Baines, Sullivan destroys the ship with artillery. Baines starts a mutiny, which the others join. Baines sinks into depression, refuses to work, and has a breakdown in which he threatens to fire the doomsday weapon. After calming him, Sullivan and Cassidy futilely attempt to make contact with command.

Hendrichs, locked in a cell, suggests to Sullivan that either Baines or Cassidy is a traitor who murdered everyone on the relief ship and set it adrift. As Sullivan mulls this over, Hendrichs disappears, which Cassidy blames on suicide. Baines and Cassidy leave to salvage the destroyed ship. Baines, in a better mood, happily announces that he has fixed several items aboard Sentinel. Sullivan investigates Baines and Cassidy while they are gone, learning that Baines is unstable. Cassidy returns alone, claiming that Baines killed himself.

Sullivan confronts Cassidy with evidence that she is a traitor. She tearfully admits to it and tells him how hard lying for so long has been. Feeling betrayed, Sullivan attempts to fire the doomsday weapon but finds that Baines has "fixed" it, too, making it useless. As they discuss their options, Sullivan and Cassidy come to realize that neither one of them wants the weapon to be used under any circumstances. They agree that if either side approaches Sentinel, they will fight those forces so neither side can claim it and repair it. Simultaneously, birds – once thought extinct because of their inability to migrate – fly by Sentinel.

== Cast ==
- Kate Bosworth as Cpl. Cassidy
- Lucien Laviscount as Pvt. Sullivan
- Martin McCann as Pvt. Baines
- Thomas Kretschmann as Sgt. Hendrichs
- Ben Pullen as Marine Sergeant
- Karin Tammaru as Marine Corporal
- Jan Erik Ehrenberg as Marine 1
- Monica Tuvi as Marine 2

== Production ==
The film is directed by Tanel Toom and written by Malachi Smyth. It is produced by Ben Pullen, Ivo Felt, Jörg Bundschuh, Pippa Cross and Matthew James Wilkinson.

Principal photography took place near Tallinn, Estonia and was completed by October 2021. Filming locations also included the Maunsell Forts off the coast of Kent in south-east England. The forts consisted of multiple towers, originally connected by bridges. The outpost in the film comprises a single tower, its design based on one of the real towers.

== Release ==
The film was released on 24 March 2023.

== Reception ==
On the review aggregator website Rotten Tomatoes, Last Contact holds an approval rating of 33% from 18 reviews.

Elisabeth Vincentelli in The New York Times described it as "slow-going but fascinating" and that the setting in an isolated, self-contained locale allows the viewer to "witness the mission’s drudgery and the paranoia slowly taking over the crew (which includes Kate Bosworth as the lone woman onboard)."
