= Marika Vaarik =

Estonian actress

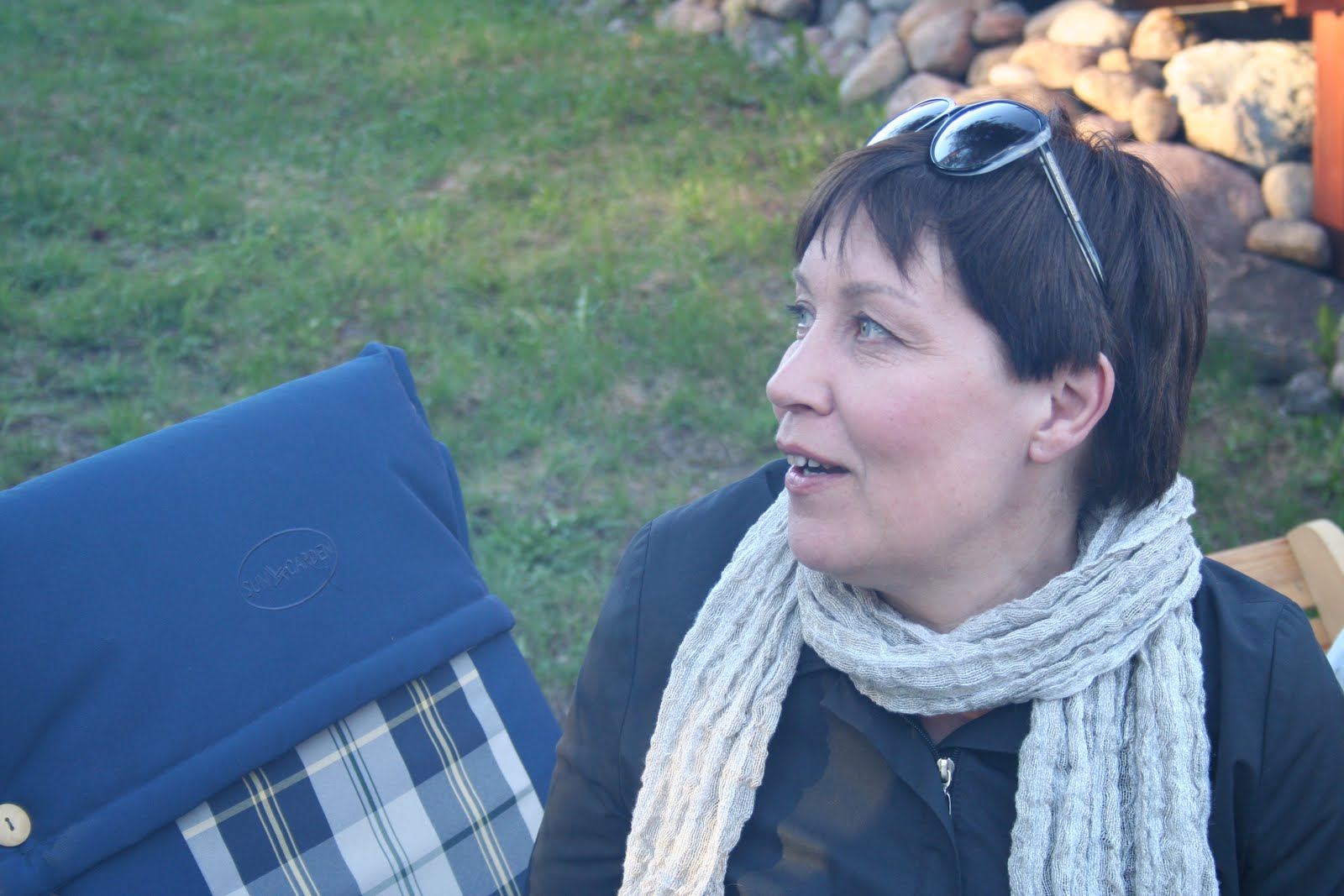
- Vaarik in 2011
- Born: October 13, 1962 (age 63); Kose, then part of Estonian SSR, Soviet Union
- Other name: Marika Vaarik-Soo
- Education: theatrical directing, Tallinn Pedagogical Institute (graduated 1991)
- Occupation: Actress

Marika Vaarik (Note: legally Marika Vaarik-Soo since 1994) (born 13 October 1962) is an Estonian actress. She has worked in films, television and theatre

In 1991, Vaarik graduated from Tallinn Pedagogical Institute with a degree in theatrical directing. In 1987, she co-founded VAT Theatre, where she worked until 1994. After leaving VAT, she worked at Rakvere Theatre until 2005 and has worked at NO99 Theatre since 2009. Vaarik is married to composer, guitarist and educator Mart Soo, a member of the Weekend Guitar Trio.

== Awards and recognitions ==
- 1999: Suur Vanker
- 2013: Order of the White Star, IV class.

== Selected filmography ==
- 2003 Vanad ja kobedad saavad jalad alla (role: Linda)
- 2005 Shop of Dreams (role: Silvia)
- 2006 Georg (television film; role: Accompanyist Aime)
- 2007 Georg (feature film; role: Old Asta Ots' voice)
- 2008: Tuulepealne maa (role: Asta Thal-Sammal)
- 2008 Taarka (role: Vasso's mother)
- 2009-2013 Kättemaksukontor (role: Frida Arrak)
- 2010 Kutsar koputab kolm korda (role: Marju)
- 2013 Elavad pildid (role: Roosi)
- 2013 Mägede varjud (role: Maria)
- 2016 The Days That Confused (role: Principal)
- 2018 Take It or Leave It (role: Judge)
- 2019 Truth and Justice (role: Madis' wife)
