= Here Comes the Dawn =

- Directed by: Zaza Urushadze
- Written by: Amiran Chichinadze; Zaza Urushadze
- Produced by: Rezo Chkheidze
- Starring: Zura Begalishvili; Nino Koberidze
- Cinematography: Igor Amasiiski
- Edited by: Neli Qristesashvili
- Music by: Giorgi Tsintsadze
- Production company: Qartuli Pilmi
- Release date: 1998
- Running time: 90 minutes
- Country: Georgia
- Language: Georgian

Here Comes the Dawn (Georgian: აქ თენდება/ Ak tendeba) is a 1998 Georgian film directed by Zaza Urushadze. It was Georgia's official Best Foreign Language Film submission at the 72nd Academy Awards, but did not receive a nomination.

== See also ==
- List of submissions to the 72nd Academy Awards for Best Foreign Language Film
- List of Georgian submissions for the Academy Award for Best Foreign Language Film
