= Rasmus Kaljujärv =

Estonian actor (born 1981)

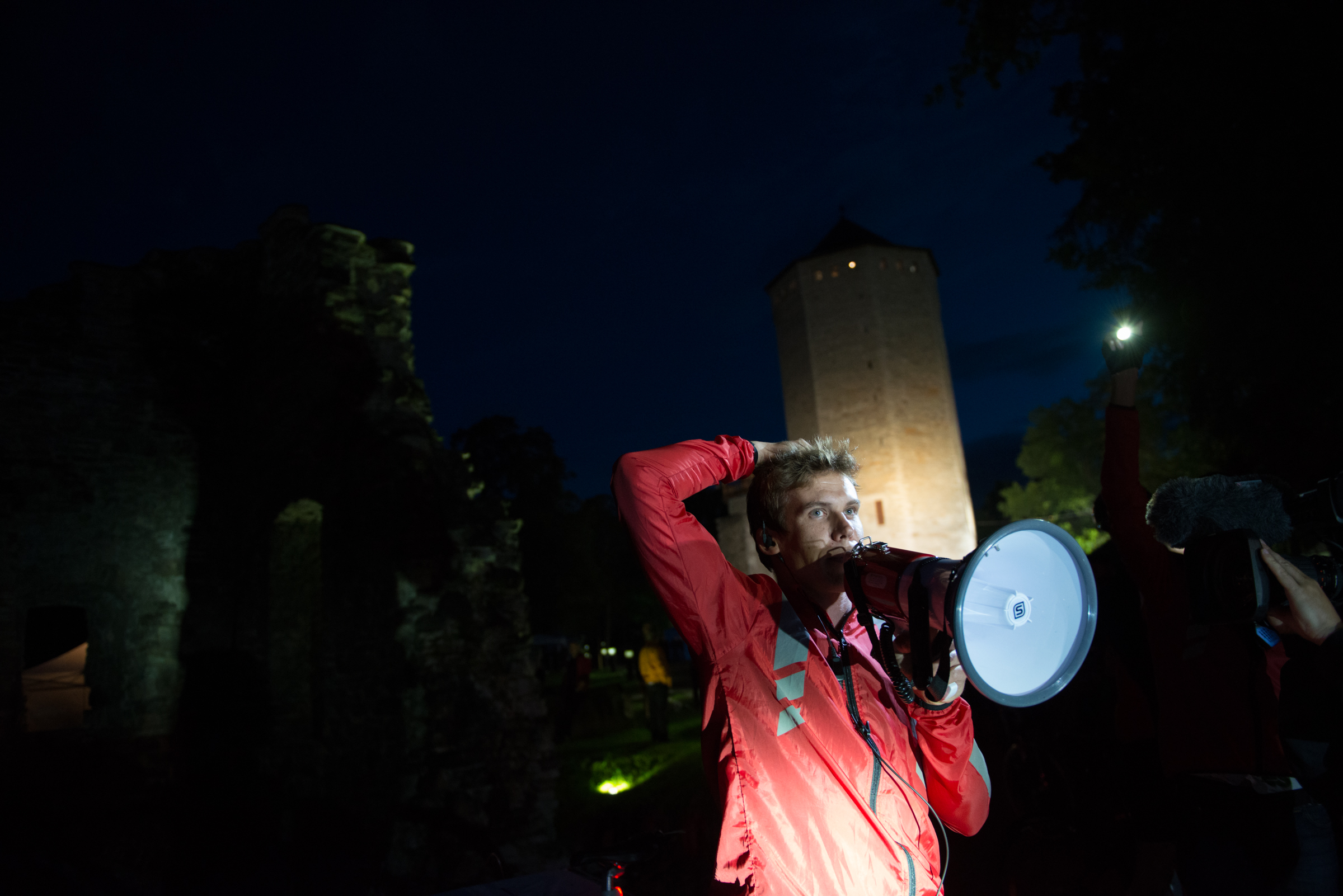
- Rasmus Kaljujärv, Arvamusfestival 2014
- Born: 28 March 1981 (age 45); Tartu, then part of Estonian SSR, Soviet Union
- Occupation: Actor
- Years active: 2003–present

Rasmus Kaljujärv (born 28 March 1981) is an Estonian actor. Kaljujärv started his movie career in 2003 and has played in 10 films and television series. His father Hannes Kaljujärv is also a well-known Estonian actor.

== Selected filmography ==
=== Films ===
Year	Film	Role	Film gross	Notes
2003	Fender Bender	Rasmus		
2005	Sagedused	Oliver		
2005	Kõrini!	Hunt		
2008	Teine tulemine	Thomas Adamson		
2008	Mina olin siin	Rass		
2008	Detsembrikuumus	Estonian officer	27 million EEK	
2016	The Days That Confused	Kalev		
2018	Between Covers	Rauno		
2021	Firebird	Pilot		

=== Television ===
Year	Title	Role	Notes
2003	Pehmed ja karvased	Unknown	
2003	Kodu keset linna	Silver	
2007	Ohtlik lend	Kaur	
2008	Tuulepealne maa	Toomas Roo	
2008	Tujurikkuja	Various roles	
2021	Süü	Sepo Kurm	
