= Amiran Chichinadze =

Georgian screenwriter

Amiran Chichinadze (Georgian: ამირან ჭიჭინაძე; 14 September 1934 - 24 June 2007) was a Georgian screenwriter and actor.

== Biography ==
In 1964 he graduated from the Higher Courses for Scriptwriters and Directors. He was a member of the CPSU from 1975.

== Filmography ==
=== As screenwriter ===
- 1966 — Falling Leaves (1966 film)
- 1971 — Mkudro savane
- 1973 — Rekordi
- 1975 — Berikatsebi
- 1980 — Tserilebi Bamidan
- 1981 — Shvidi patara motkhroba pirvel sikvarulze
- 1985 — Kvelaze stsrapebi msoplioshi
- 1985 — Batono avanturistebo
- 1988 — Nazaris ukanaskneli lotsva
- 1989 – 30 cm zgvis donidan
- 1989 — Dzaglis knosva
- 1990 — Tsetskhltan tamashi
- 1992 — Shvidkatsa
- 1992 — Khapangi
- 1995 — Khiznebi
- 1996 — Ra gatsinebs?!
- 1998 — Here Comes the Dawn
- 2002 — Angelozis gadaprena

=== As producer ===
- 1970 — Kvevri

=== As actor ===
- 2002 — Angelozis gadaprena

== Awards ==
- 1983 — Honored Art Worker of the Georgian SSR

== Literature ==
- Cinema: Encyclopedic Dictionary / Ch. ed. S. I. Yutkevich Moscow, Soviet Encyclopedia, 1987 p. 489
