= Giorgi Nakashidze =

Georgian actor

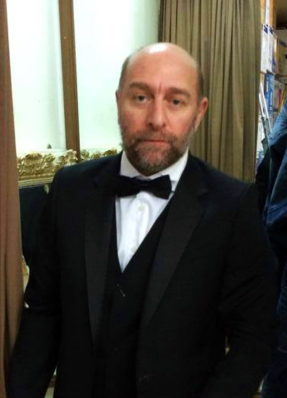
- Born: 23 July 1971 (age 54); Tbilisi, Georgia
- Occupation: Actor
- Years active: 1995–present
- Family: Nakashidze

Giorgi Nakashidze (Georgian: გიორგი ნაკაშიძე; born on 23 July 1971 in Tbilisi, Georgia) is a Georgian film, television, and stage actor.

Born in Tbilisi, Georgia, Nakashidze starred in the 2014 film Tangerines which was nominated for the Best Foreign Language Film at the 87th Academy Awards. It was also among the five nominated films at the 72nd Golden Globe Awards for best foreign language film.

At the 2014 Eurasia Film Festival, the best actor award went to Nakashidze and the three other lead actors (Lembit Ulfsak, Elmo Nüganen, and Mikhail Meskhi) in the film “Tangerines”.

In 2015, Nakashidze was arrested for minor hooliganism. Reportedly, a drunken Nakashidze approached police officers and a verbal altercation ensued. The police arrested him and transferred him to the police station. The Interior Ministry confirmed his detention. According to them, the detainee was charged under Article 173 of the Administrative Code, pertaining to resistance to police and minor hooliganism. He was freed after paying a fine.

== Filmography ==
- Atu - Alaba (Otel Kalipornia) (1995)
- A Chef in Love (1996)
- Otsnebebis sasaplao (1997)
- Samotkhe chveni qalaqis quchebshi (2000)
- Djen prischjol (2004)
- Mtvris gemo (2004)
- Cheri anu daumtavrebeli pilmis masala (2005)
- Graffiti (2006)
- Reverse (2006)
- Qagaldis Tkvia (2007)
- Mediator (2008)
- Tbilisuri Love Story (2009)
- Jaqo's Dispossessed (2009)
- The Watchmaker (2011)
- A Fold in My Blanket (2013)
- Tangerines (2013)
- Inhale-Exhale (2019)
