= List of submissions to the 72nd Academy Awards for Best Foreign Language Film =

1999 Best Foreign Language Film submissions
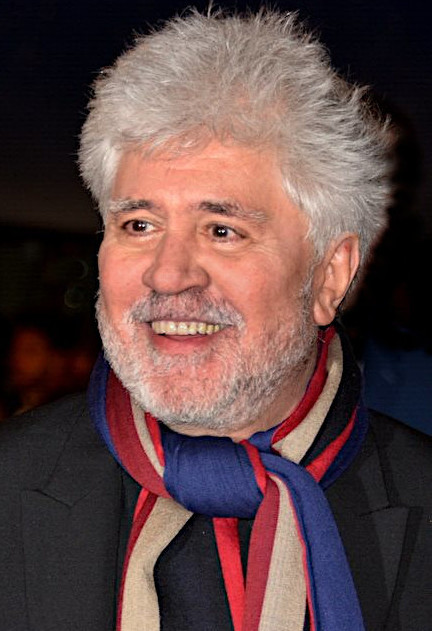
- Pedro Almodóvar directed All About My Mother, which won the year's award.

Highlights
- Oscar winner: (Spain) All About My Mother
- Submissions: 47
- Debuts: 3

This is a list of submissions to the 72nd Academy Awards for the Best Foreign Language Film. The Academy of Motion Picture Arts and Sciences (AMPAS) has invited the film industries of various countries to submit their best film for the Academy Award for Best Foreign Language Film every year since the award was created in 1956. The award is presented annually by the Academy to a feature-length motion picture produced outside the United States that contains primarily non-English dialogue. The Foreign Language Film Award Committee oversees the process and reviews all the submitted films.

For the 72nd Academy Awards, the submitted motion pictures must have first been released theatrically in their respective countries between 1 November 1998 and 31 October 1999. The deadline for submissions to the Academy was 1 November 1999. 47 countries submitted films and were found to be eligible by AMPAS and screened for voters. Bhutan, Nepal, and Tajikistan submitted films for the first time. The five nominees were announced on 15 February 2000.

Spain won the award for the third time with All About My Mother by Pedro Almodóvar.

== Submissions ==
Submitting country	Film title used in nomination	Original title	Language(s)	Director(s)	Result
Argentina	Manuelita		Spanish	Manuel García Ferré	Not nominated
Austria	Northern Skirts	Nordrand	Viennese German, German, Serbian, Bosnian, Romanian, Russian, Czech	Barbara Albert	Not nominated
Belgium	Rosetta		French	Jean-Pierre and Luc Dardenne	Not nominated
Bhutan	The Cup	ཕོར་པ།	Lhasa Tibetan, Hindi	Khyentse Norbu	Not nominated
Brazil	Orfeu		Brazilian Portuguese	Carlos Diegues	Not nominated
Canada	Set Me Free	Emporte-moi	French	Léa Pool	Not nominated
China	Lover's Grief Over the Yellow River	黄河绝恋	Mandarin, English	Feng Xiaoning	Not nominated
Colombia	Time Out	Golpe de estadio	Spanish	Sergio Cabrera	Not nominated
Croatia	Red Dust	Crvena prašina	Croatian	Zrinko Ogresta	Not nominated
Czech Republic	The Idiot Returns	Návrat idiota	Czech	Saša Gedeon	Not nominated
Denmark	Mifune	Mifunes sidste sang	Danish	Søren Kragh-Jacobsen	Not nominated
Finland	The Tough Ones	Häjyt	Finnish	Aleksi Mäkelä	Not nominated
France	East/West	Est-Ouest / Восток-Запад	French, Russian	Régis Wargnier	Nominated
Georgia	Here Comes the Dawn	აქ თენდება	Georgian	Zaza Urushadze	Not nominated
Germany	Aimée & Jaguar	Aimée und Jaguar	German	Max Färberböck	Not nominated
Greece	From the Edge of the City	Από την Άκρη της Πόλης	Greek, Russian	Constantinos Giannaris	Not nominated
Hong Kong	Ordinary Heroes	千言萬語	Cantonese	Ann Hui	Not nominated
Hungary	The Lord's Lantern in Budapest	Nekem lámpást adott kezembe az Úr Pesten	Hungarian	Miklós Jancsó	Not nominated
Iceland	The Honour of the House	Ungfrúin góða og húsið	Icelandic, Danish, Swedish	Guðný Halldórsdóttir	Not nominated
India	Earth	अर्थ	Hindi, English, Parsi Gujarati, Punjabi, Urdu	Deepa Mehta	Not nominated
Indonesia	Sri		Indonesian, Javanese	Marselli Sumarno	Not nominated
Iran	The Colours of Paradise	رنگ خدا	Persian, Talysh, Azerbaijani	Majid Majidi	Not nominated
Israel	Yana's Friends	החברים של יאנה	Hebrew, Russian, English	Arik Kaplun	Not nominated
Italy	Not of This World	Fuori dal mondo	Italian	Giuseppe Piccioni	Not nominated
Japan	Railroad Man	鉄道員	Japanese	Yasuo Furuhata	Not nominated
Lebanon	Around the Pink House	Autour de la maison rose / البيت الزهري	French, Arabic	Joana Hadjithomas and Khalil Joreige	Not nominated
Mexico	No One Writes to the Colonel	El coronel no tiene quien le escriba	Spanish	Arturo Ripstein	Not nominated
Nepal	Caravan	हिमालय / Himalaya, l'enfance d'un chef	Dolpo, Nepali, German	Éric Valli	Nominated
Netherlands	Scratches in the Table	Madelief, krassen in het tafelblad	Dutch	Ineke Houtman	Not nominated
Norway	The Prompter	Suffløsen	Norwegian	Hilde Heier	Not nominated
Peru	Captain Pantoja and the Special Services	Pantaleón y las visitadoras	Spanish	Francisco J. Lombardi	Not nominated
Philippines	The Kite	Saranggola	Filipino	Gil Portes	Not nominated
Poland	Sir Thaddeus	Pan Tadeusz	Polish	Andrzej Wajda	Not nominated
Portugal	The Mutants	Os Mutantes	Portuguese	Teresa Villaverde	Not nominated
Romania	The Famous Paparazzo	Faimosul paparazzo	Romanian	Nicolae Mărgineanu	Not nominated
Russia	Moloch	Молох	German, Russian	Alexander Sokurov	Not nominated
Slovakia	All My Loved Ones	Vsichni moji blízcí	Czech	Matej Mináč	Not nominated
Spain	All About My Mother	Todo sobre mi madre	Spanish, Catalan, English	Pedro Almodóvar	Won Academy Award
Sweden	Under the Sun	Under solen	Swedish	Colin Nutley	Nominated
Switzerland	Beresina, or The Last Days of Switzerland	Beresina oder Die letzten Tage der Schweiz	Swiss German, German	Daniel Schmid	Not nominated
Tajikistan	Luna Papa	Лунный папа	Russian, Tajik, Uzbek	Bakhtyar Khudojnazarov	Not nominated
Taiwan	March of Happiness	天馬茶房	Taiwanese Hokkien, Japanese, Mandarin, Shanghainese	Lin Cheng-sheng	Not nominated
Turkey	Mrs. Salkim's Diamonds	Salkım Hanımın Taneleri	Turkish, Western Armenian	Tomris Giritlioğlu	Not nominated
United Kingdom	Solomon and Gaenor	Solomon a Gaenor	Welsh, Yiddish, English	Paul Morrison	Nominated
Venezuela	Glue Sniffer	Huelepega: ley de la calle	Spanish	Elia Schneider	Not nominated
Vietnam	Three Seasons	Ba mùa	Vietnamese, English	Tony Bui	Not nominated
FR Yugoslavia	The White Suit	Бело одело	Serbian	Lazar Ristovski	Not nominated

== Bibliography ==
- Nichols, William J. (2011). Transatlantic Mysteries: Crime, Culture, and Capital in the "Noir Novels" of Paco Ignacio Taibo II and Manuel Vázquez Montalbán. Lanham, Maryland, United States: Rowman & Littlefield. ISBN 978-1611480405.
