= Lauri Vahtre =

Estonian translator, historian and politician (born 1960)

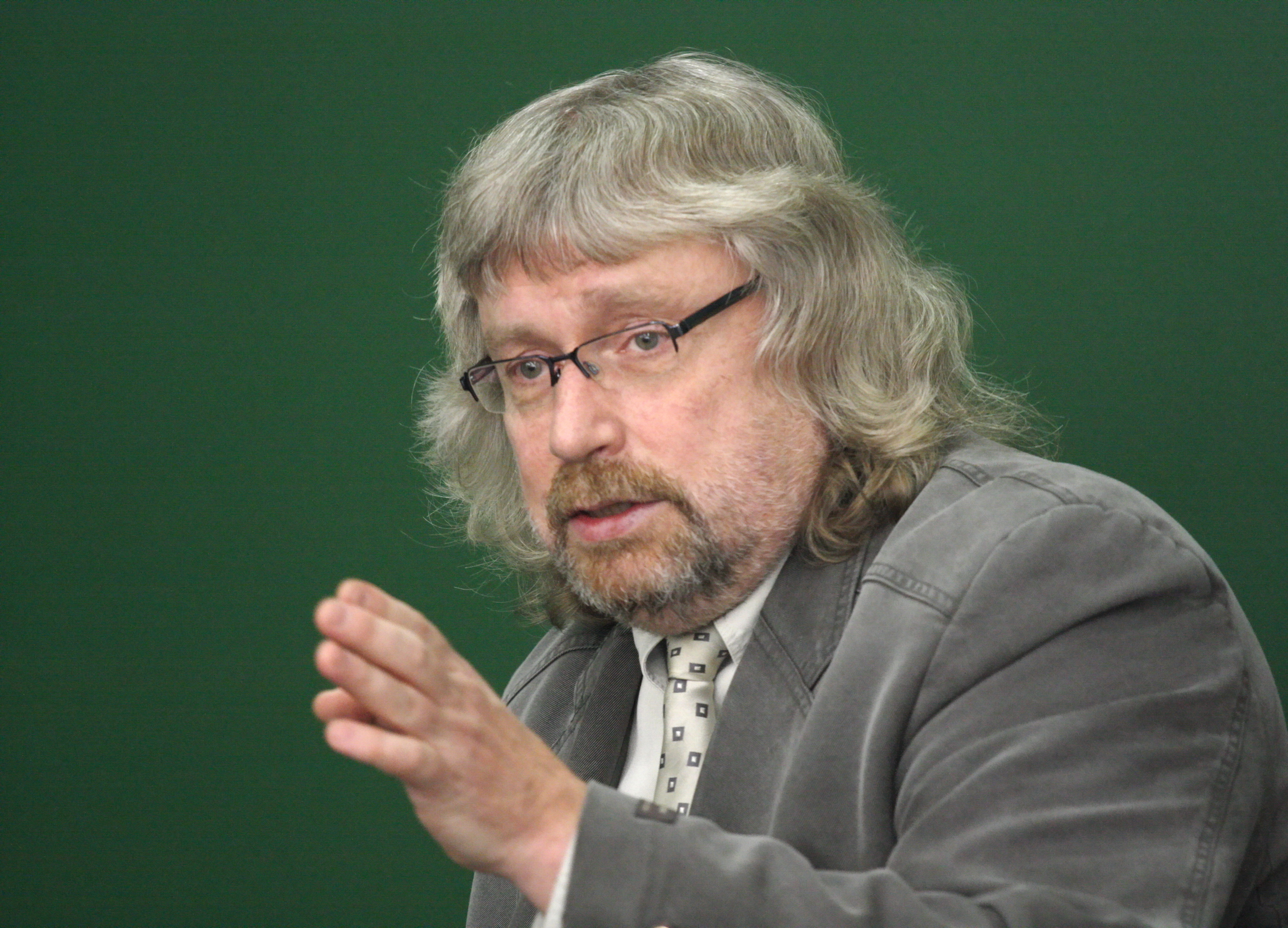
Lauri Vahtre (2010)

Lauri Vahtre (born 22 March 1960) is an Estonian politician, historian, translator and writer.

== Education and career ==
Lauri Vahtre was born in Tartu. He graduated from Tartu Secondary School Nr 2 in 1978 and from Tartu University history department in 1984 (1988 PhD). From 1983 to 1985, he worked as a senior research fellow in the Estonian Open Air Museum, then continued his postgraduate studies. From 1988 to 1992, he worked as a senior researcher in the Institute of History of the Estonian Academy of Sciences, from 1989 to 1992 as a senior teacher at the Tartu University. As a historian, Lauri Vahtre is known as a populariser of history and a co-author of several schoolbooks. His research work has concentrated on the history of Estonian Bar Association and Soviet time mentality among other topics. 2015-2020 Vahtre lead a group of historians, creating 2-volume research "History of the Estonian War of Independence" which was published 2021. See: https://et.wikipedia.org/wiki/Eesti_Vabadussõja_ajalugu

== Political career ==
Lauri Vahtre joined politics during the Singing Revolution together with his university mate Mart Laar. Just before graduation, Vahtre was expelled from the Tartu State University because of his patriotic views and activities, so he had to complete his studies as an extern. Together with Laar and other patriots, they formed a political association, which in 1992 developed into a National Coalition Party "Pro Patria" (Rahvuslik Koonderakond "Isamaa"). Vahtre was a member of the Congress of Estonia and from 1991 to 1992 a member of the Constitutional Assembly. In 1992, as a result of the victory of Pro Patria in the national elections, Lauri Vahtre was elected a member of the VII Riigikogu. He became one of the political leaders of the party and was re-elected to the parliament in 1995 and 1999. In 2003, the party faced a loss in the parliamentary election, and Vahtre did not get elected. He returned to the parliament again in 2007 and became a member of the parliamentary Committee on Cultural Affairs as well as the National Heritage Association.

== International activity ==
In the parliament, Lauri Vahtre was a member of the Estonia-India Parliamentary Group as well as the Estonia-Croatia Parliamentary Group. He also belonged to the Taiwan and Tibet Support Groups. From 2001 to 2003, Lauri Vahtre was a member of the Parliamentary Assembly of the Council of Europe. He was a rapporteur on Moldova (together with Josette Durrieu).

== Awards ==
3rd class Order of the National Coat of Arms (2001)

== Personal ==
Lauri Vahtre's father was the historian Sulev Vahtre. His brother is the artist Silver Vahtre.

== Membership in associations ==
Lauri Vahtre is a member of Estonian Students' Society, and a member of Isamaa.

== Books (selection) ==
- Torm, Varrak 2010, ISBN 978-9985-3-2038-9
- Absurdi impeerium, Tammerraamat 2007, ISBN 978-9985-9785-0-4
- Ajaloo pööripäevad (vol 2), Tammerraamat 2007, ISBN 978-9985-9831-3-3
- Ajaloo pööripäevad, Tammerraamat 2006, ISBN 978-9985-9692-9-8
- Eesti Advokatuuri ajalugu 1919–1994, Tallinn 2005, ISBN 9985-57-761-2
- Eesti rahva lugu, Ilo 2005, ISBN 9985-57-662-4
- Suur pettumus, Varrak 2002, ISBN 978-9985-3-0623-9
- Eesti kultuuri ajalugu. Lühiülevaade, Virgela 2000, ISBN 9985-862-69-4
- Eestlase aeg, Varrak 2000, ISBN 9985-3-0412-8
- Meenutusi kadunud maailmast, ehk, Keskkoolist, ülikoolist, matkadest, malevast, väljakaevamistest ja muust aastail 1975–1984", Tallinn 1999, ISBN 9985-2-0126-4
- Teine lugemine, Virgela 1998, ISBN 9985-862-33-3

== Published in English ==
- Empire of the absurd: a brief history of the absurdities of the Soviet Union / foreword by Mart Laar; [translation from Estonian: Tarmo Heyduck]. Ontario, 2010. 201 pages. ISBN 978-0-9865311-0-1. This book is dedicated to probably the greatest flowering of man-made absurdity in history - The Soviet Union
- Estonian home / [photos:] Henri van Noordenburg; text by Lauri Vahtre; [design: Piia Ruber] [Tallinn] : Eesti Instituut, 2008 ([Tallinn : Folger Art]) 44 pages. ISBN 978-9985-9698-1-6
- Humanism vs humanity / translated by Enn Veldi. Tallinn : Grenader, 2008. 163 pages. Original title: Suur pettumus ehk inimene, ühiskond ja inimõigused. ISBN 978-9949-448-11-1
- Republic of Estonia 90 / [text of the exhibition catalogue: Lauri Vahtre; graphic design: Angelika Schneider] [Tallinn : Eesti Instituut, 2008]. 48 pages. ISBN 978-9985-9698-5-4
- Good old Swedish era – how long did it last and how good was it really? // Life in Estonia, Summer 2008, pages 18–22. Article bout the historical period between 1561–1710, when Estonia was part of the Kingdom of Sweden.
- The Red Book of the Peoples of the Russian Empire / 1993 / Eesti Keele Institute/Institute of the Estonian Language / Consultants: Ants Viires and Lauri Vahtre / Edited by Andrew Humpries and Krista Mits; ISBN 9985-9369-2-2

== Translations from English ==
- McLynn, Frank. Napoleon. Tallinn, Varrak, 2002, ISBN 9985-3-0537-X
- Quinton, Anthony. Hume. Tallinn, Varrak, 2000, ISBN 9985-3-0367-9
- Ayers, Michael. Locke. Tallinn, Varrak, 2000, ISBN 9985-3-0367-9
- Tanner, Michael. Schopenhauer. Tallinn, Varrak, 2000, ISBN 9985-3-0368-7
- Berman, David. Berkeley. Tallinn, Varrak, 2000, ISBN 9985-3-0369-5
- Hughes, Lindsey. Peeter Suur (Peter the Great). Tallinn, Varrak 2005, ISBN 9985-3-0950-2
- Cornwell, Bernard. Sharpe (three volumes). Tallinn, Varrak 1998, ISBN 9985-3-0166-8, ISBN 9985-3-0206-0, ISBN 9985-3-0141-2

== Films ==
- Detsembrikuumus (December Heat) : [drama : video] / director: Asko Kase; written by: Lauri Vahtre, Mihkel Ulman. Tallinn: Home Entertainment Group (distributor), 2009. DVD.
- Tuulepealne maa (Windward Land) : [12 episodes : drama : video] / director: Ain Prosa; written by: Mihkel Ulman, Lauri Vahtre. Tallinn: Sonatiin (distributor) : BEC, 2008.
