= Rea Lest-Liik =

Estonian actress

- Born: Rea Lest; 14 May 1990 (age 36); Tallinn, Estonia
- Occupation: Actress
- Years active: 2014–present
- Spouse: Jörgen Liik (m. 2018; died 2025)

Rea Lest-Liik (born 14 May 1990) is an Estonian stage and film actress who came to prominence in the 2010s following leading roles in several Estonian films, such as Ema (2016), Mehetapja/Süütu/Vari (2017), and November (2017). She has won several awards for stage and film roles.

== Early life and education ==
Rea Lest was born and raised in Tallinn. She is a 2009 graduate of the Jakob Westholm Gymnasium secondary school. In 2010, she enrolled at the University of Tartu to study art therapy, but left shortly after to enroll in the Estonian Academy of Music and Theatre's drama department to study acting under instructor Tiit Ojasoo. In 2012, she won the Voldemar Panso Young Actor Award while studying at academy. She graduated from the academy in 2014. Among her graduating classmates were actors Jaanika Arum, Helena Pruuli, Reimo Sagor, Simeoni Sundja, Kärt Tammjärv, and future husband Jörgen Liik.

== Career ==
In 2014, shortly after graduating from the Estonian Academy of Music and Theatre, Lest began an engagement at the Theatre NO99; a non-profit foundation repertory theatre in Tallinn. Lest left the theatre in 2018, prior to its closing in 2019.

Lest made her film debut in the 2014 student film comedy short Lõputu suvi (English: Endless Summer), directed by Jaan Penjam, and was Penjam's master's thesis production for the Film Department of the Baltic Film and Media School. In 2016, she was cast in her first feature-length film as the character Riin in the Kadri Kõusaar directed darkly comic crime mystery Ema (English: Mother). The film was selected as Estonia's entry for the Academy Award for Best International Feature Film category at the 2017 89th Academy Awards.

In 2016, was cast in the lead role of Liina in the 2017 Rainer Sarnet directed gothic fantasy thriller November, based on Andrus Kivirähk's 2000 novel Rehepapp ehk November. The film received positive reviews and was selected as the Estonian entry for the Academy Award for Best Foreign Language Film at the 90th Academy Awards, but it was not nominated. It made its North American premiere in the International Narrative Competition at the Tribeca Film Festival in 2017. The film is also notable for being Estonian veteran actor Arvo Kukumägi's last film role before his death in May 2017.

The same year, Lest appeared as the lead in the Sulev Keedus directed drama Mehetapja/Süütu/Vari (English: The Man Slayer/The Virgin/The Shadow). Lest portrayed three different protagonists in three historical triptychs of women in Estonia struggling to decide their own destiny.

In 2019, she appeared in a leading role opposite former Estonian Academy of Music and Theatre classmate Reimo Sagor in the Martti Helde directed psychological thriller Skandinaavia vaikus (English: Scandinavian Silence). The film won both the critics and the audience award at the 2019 Riga Film Festival.

== Acknowledgements and awards ==
In 2018, Rea Lest won the Actress of the Year award at the Annual Awards of the Estonian Cultural Endowment in the field of audiovisual art for her roles in both November and Mehetapja/Süütu/Vari. In March of that year, she was awarded Best Actress in a Film at the Estonian Film and Television Awards (EFTA) for her role in November.

In 2019, she was among ten European actors selected from twenty-nine candidates, each representing their country, to be presented with the European Shooting Stars Award by the European Film Promotion (EFP). The event took place in February 2019 during the 69th Berlin International Film Festival.

== Personal life ==
In 2018, Rea Lest wed former Estonian Academy of Music and Theatre classmate Jörgen Liik. The two had appeared opposite one another in both Mehetapja/Süütu/Vari and November. Following her marriage, Lest began hyphenating her name as Rea Lest-Liik. Jörgen Liik died on 11 July 2025, aged 35.
