= Tangerines (film) =

2013 film

- Film poster
- Directed by: Zaza Urushadze
- Written by: Zaza Urushadze
- Produced by: Ivo Felt; Zaza Urushadze
- Starring: Lembit Ulfsak; Giorgi Nakashidze; Elmo Nüganen; Mikheil Meskhi; Raivo Trass
- Cinematography: Rein Kotov
- Edited by: Alexander Kuranov
- Music by: Niaz Diasamidze, Irakli Charkviani
- Distributed by: Allfilm, Cinema 24, Samuel Goldwyn Films
- Release date: 15 October 2013
- Running time: 87 minutes
- Countries: Estonia, Georgia
- Languages: Estonian, Russian, Georgian
- Budget: €650,000
- Box office: $1,052,799

Tangerines (Georgian: მანდარინები Mandarinebi, Estonian: Mandariinid) is a 2013 Estonian–Georgian film written, produced, and directed by Zaza Urushadze. Set during the 1992–1993 War in Abkhazia, the film's themes span conflict and war, reconciliation, and pacifism. It was filmed in Guria, Georgia.

Tangerines was nominated for Best Foreign Language Film award at the 87th Academy Awards and the 72nd Golden Globe Awards, but ultimately lost to the Polish film Ida (2013) and to the epic Russian film Leviathan (2014).

== Plot ==
In a rural village of ethnic Estonians in Abkhazia, a Russian-backed separatist region in the newly independent Georgia, Ivo and his friend Margus are the only two of their once large community who have not fled for Estonia after the outbreak of the war. Margus has delayed leaving until he can harvest his lucrative tangerine crop. Ivo, a carpenter, is attempting to make enough wooden crates to hold all the unpicked tangerines, but doesn't reveal his reasons for staying.

Two Chechen mercenaries fighting alongside the Abkhaz separatists appear and demand food from Ivo before leaving peacefully. However, they get into a shootout with Georgian Army soldiers in front of Margus' house, leaving only one alive from each side. Ahmed, the surviving Chechen, and Nika, a Georgian volunteer, are both gravely wounded, and Ivo brings them into his home to nurse them back to health.

Ivo gets a promise from both to not carry out any retaliation under his roof, even if they both promise to kill one another once they get the strength. When the two rivals continue to heal over a period of days in the same tiny dwelling, there is a significant degree of tension between them. The two slowly start to see each other's honor and humanity. The two transform their hostility and animosity into respect and camaraderie under the moral supervision of Ivo.

When Abkhaz soldiers come to the house, Ivo convinces Ahmed to tell them that Nika is also a fellow Chechen whose head wound has left him unable to speak.

After a local military patrol fails to harvest the tangerines as planned, Margus is desperate. The Abkhaz soldiers, having set up camp nearby, promise to help harvest the tangerines in two days. That night, however, a shelling hits the village, destroying Margus' property. Ahmed offers Margus a large wad of cash that he has made from being a mercenary, but Margus refuses money "made like that."

Russian troops allied to the Abkhaz and Chechens later drive up to Ivo's house, finding Ahmed and Margus outside, and falsely accuse Ahmed of being Georgian. They are about to execute him when Nika shoots them from the house with a rifle. In the firefight, Margus is killed by Russian gunfire. Ahmed and Nika partner to fight the Russians, but Nika is shot dead by a wounded Russian before Ahmed finishes off Nika's killer.

Ivo and Ahmed bury Margus and Nika. Ivo reveals that Nika's body lies next to that of his own son, who was killed when the war broke out in August 1992. Ivo tells Ahmed that if he had died instead of Nika, Ivo would have buried Ahmed next to his son as well. Ahmed tells Ivo that he misses his own family, and begins his drive home to a Chechnya that will be plunged into a similar bloody war less than two years later. He listens to a cassette tape of Georgian music that belonged to Nika.

== Music ==
The closing credits of Tangerines features a famous Georgian song, ქაღალდის გემი (მე გადმოვცურავ ზღვას), performed by Irakli Charkviani. Originally from Charkviani's 1993 album "Svan Songs", the composition is roughly contemporaneous with the events described in the film and touches on the theme of longing and reuniting after a period of separation.

== Cast ==
- Lembit Ulfsak as Ivo, an elderly Estonian farmer living in Abkhazia. He is a hawk-faced older fellow, who never hesitates; he instantly helps others, regardless of their "side" in this misery.
- Giorgi Nakashidze as Ahmed, a wounded Chechen soldier
- Elmo Nüganen as Margus, a friend of Ivo, another Estonian farmer
- Mikheil (Misha) Meskhi as Nika, a wounded Georgian soldier and an ethnic Christian
- Raivo Trass as Juhan

== Reception ==
=== Critical response ===
The film received an 88% rating from review aggregator Rotten Tomatoes based on 64 reviews, with an average rating of 7.30/10. The site's critical consensus reads, "Tangerines' impassioned message and the strong work of a solid cast more than make up for the movie's flawed narrative and uneven structure." On Metacritic, the film has a weighted average score of 73 out of 100 based on 18 critics, indicating "generally favorable reviews".

According to the film critic Anthony D'Alessandro, Nüganen drew a parallel to the 2014 Ukraine-Russia Conflict.

== Accolades ==
Award	Date of ceremony	Category	Recipient(s)	Result	Ref(s)
Academy Awards	22 February 2015	Best Foreign Language Film	Tangerines	Nominated	
Gaudí Awards	31 January 2016	Best European Film	Tangerines	Won	
Bari International Film Festival	12 April 2014	Best Picture	Tangerines	Won	
Fajr International Film Festival	4 February 2014	The Crystal Phoenix for Best Picture	Zaza Urushadze and Ivo Felt	Won	
Fajr International Film Festival	4 February 2014	The Crystal Simorgh for Best Screenplay	Zaza Urushadze	Won	
Golden Globe Awards	11 January 2015	Best Foreign Language Film	Tangerines	Nominated	
International Filmfestival Mannheim-Heidelberg	10 November 2013	Audience Award	Tangerines	Won	
International Filmfestival Mannheim-Heidelberg	10 November 2013	Mannheim-Heidelberg Special Award	Tangerines	Won	
Jerusalem Film Festival	19 July 2014	In the Spirit of Freedom Awards in Memory of Wim van Leer	Zaza Urushadze and Tangerines	Honourable mention	
Satellite Awards	15 February 2015	Best Foreign Language Film	Tangerines	Won	
Tallinn Black Nights Film Festival	30 November 2013	Best Estonian Film	Tangerines	Won	
War on Screen	5 October 2014	Jury Grand Prix	Tangerines	Won	
Warsaw International Film Festival	20 November 2013	Audience Award: Best Feature Film	Tangerines	Won	
Warsaw International Film Festival	20 November 2013	Best Director Award	Zaza Urushadze	Won	

== See also ==
- List of submissions to the 87th Academy Awards for Best Foreign Language Film
- List of Estonian submissions for the Academy Award for Best Foreign Language Film
