= Tuulepealne maa =

Estonian television series

- Created by: Mihkel Ulman; Lauri Vahtre
- Directed by: Ain Prosa
- Starring: Rasmus Kaljujärv; Märt Avandi; Evelin Pang; Mirtel Pohla; Marko Matvere; Üllar Saaremäe
- Theme music composer: Metsatöll, Leelo Tungal, Valter Ojakäär
- Opening theme: "Oma laulu ei leia ma üles"
- Country of origin: Estonia
- Original language: Estonian
- No. of seasons: 1
- No. of episodes: 13

Production
- Executive producer: Kädi Rammula
- Producer: Raivo Suviste (:et)
- Running time: 55 minutes (episode 13: 90 minutes)

Original release
- Network: ETV
- Release: 9 October 2008 – 24 February 2013

Tuulepealne maa ("Windward Land") is a twelve-part Estonian television mini-series about the pre-World War II history of Estonia, its birth as a country, the Estonian War of Independence, post-war life throughout 1920 up to 1941 and World War II.

The series first aired on 9 October 2008 on Estonia's ETV. Each episode runs at approximately 55 minutes. The show was created by Mihkel Ulman and historian Lauri Vahtre, the series is produced by Raivo Suviste and directed by Ain Prosa. DVD was released in the April 2009. But the last part "Not a War for Young Men" aired on 24 February 2013.

The last post-finale episode of the series, "Ei ole sõda noortele meestele", was released on February 24, 2013, commemorating the 95th anniversary of the Estonian Declaration of Independence.

== Plot ==
The main characters in the series are a Lääne County-native Toomas Roo (Kaljujärv), who is to start his studies in Tallinn, and Indrek Kallaste (Avandi), a son of wealth, who studies at the same school as Toomas. The series plot follows the lives of the two young men as they witness the birth of the Estonian Republic, fight in the Estonian War of Independence and live through the first period of independence up to the World War II.

The show also features historic characters, such as Konstantin Päts and Johan Laidoner, the Estonian Declaration of Independence and other major events.

The final episode of the series, "Ei ole sõda noortele meestele", takes place during the German occupation in autumn of 1943. It follows Siim Pärtel, the nephew of Toomas Roo, as he and his friends try to evade conscription into the Estonian Legion.

== Episodes ==
- Part one – Üheks päevaks iseseisvust (Independence for a Day)
- Part two – Koolipingist rindele (From Schooldesk to a Battlefield)
- Part three – Sõda on sõda (War Is War)
- Part four – Quo Vadis?
- Part five – Südameasjad (Affairs of the Heart)
- Part six – Armastusest ja sõprusest (Of Love and Friendship)
- Part seven – Tulivesi (Firewater)
- Part eight – Vapsid (Veterans of the War of Independence)
- Part nine – Vaikus (Silence)
- Part ten – Mis saab? (What Will Be?)
- Part eleven – Uppuv laev (Sinking Ship)
- Part twelve – Klaasist riik (State of Glass)
- Part thirteen – Ei ole sõda noortele meestele (Not a War for Young Men)

== Cast ==
- Rasmus Kaljujärv as Toomas Roo
- Märt Avandi as Indrek Kallaste
- Evelin Pang as Adele Kallaste
- Mirtel Pohla as Maret Kallaste
- Marko Matvere as Artur Kallaste
- Andrus Vaarik as Osvald Kallaste
- Tõnu Oja as Joosep Roo
- Ago Anderson as Herbert Sammal
- Kristjan Sarv as Leo Solba
- Tõnu Mikiver as Einar Soodla
- Üllar Saaremäe as Karl Ploompuu
- Ülle Lichtfeldt as Maria Kallaste
- Liina-Riin Olmaru as Elfriede Kallaste
- Anne Reemann as Inge Roo
- Marika Vaarik as Asta Sammal
- Indrek Taalmaa as Konstantin Päts
- Eero Spriit as Johan Laidoner
- Marin Mägi-Efert as Marju Pärtel
- Taavi Teplenkov as Sarapiku Jass
- Veljo Reinik as Anton Telg
- Ester Pajusoo as Reet
- Hele Kõrve as Ivi Kallaste
- Priit Loog as Richard Rõõmus
- Inga Salurand as Silvia
- Egon Nuter as Jakob
- Jörgen Liik as Siim Pärtel
- Tambet Tuisk as Kalju Riislaid
- Sulev Teppart as Veltveebel Rohi
