= Kõrini! =

2005 Estonian film

- Directed by: Peeter Simm
- Produced by: Artur Talvik, Hans-Werner Honert
- Production companies: Ruut, Saxonia Media Filmproduktion (Germany), MDR Mitteldeutscher Rundfunk (Germany)
- Release date: 2005
- Countries: Estonia, Germany
- Language: Estonian

Kõrini! (English: Fed Up!) is a 2005 Estonian-German comedy film directed by Peeter Simm.

== Cast ==
- Heio von Stetten - Kaminsky
- Rasmus Kaljujärv - Hunt
- Maarja Jakobson - Stella
- Thomas Schmauser - Manfred

== Awards ==
- 2006: Kinoshock - Open Film Festival for states of the CIS and Estonia, Latvia and Lithuania (Anapa, Russia), Grand Prix - best feature film
- 2006: BIAFF - Batum International Art-House Film Festival (Georgia), best feature film
- 2006: Listapad - Minsk International Film Festival (at Minsk, Valgevene (Belarus)), special prize by the jury
