= Falling Leaves (1966 film) =

- Directed by: Otar Iosseliani
- Written by: Amiran Chichinadze
- Produced by: J. Gvenetadze
- Starring: Ramaz Giorgobiani Gogi Kharabadze
- Cinematography: Abesalom Maisuradze
- Music by: Natela Iosseliani
- Release date: January 16, 1966
- Running time: 91 minutes
- Country: Soviet Union
- Languages: Georgian; Russian

Falling Leaves (Georgian: გიორგობისთვე) is a 1966 Soviet drama film directed by Otar Iosseliani. The film was screened at the International Critics' Week of the 1968 Cannes Film Festival.

== Plot ==
The story follows young technologist Nikо Nizharadze as he starts working at a wine factory alongside his friend. Nikо initially appears to lack confidence, assertiveness, and discipline, but he is honest and straightforward, traits that set him apart. His integrity is soon tested when he becomes involved in a conflict over production practices. To meet production targets, the factory management insists on bottling not only high-quality wine but also immature, inferior Saperavi. This practice is well known among workers, who discreetly warn their friends and family to avoid these low-quality batches.

Meanwhile, Nikо begins courting Marina, a beautiful and capricious coworker who is the object of many men's affection. Marina enjoys teasing her suitors and pitting them against her most jealous and aggressive admirer for her amusement. Nikо must navigate his feelings for Marina while also contending with her manipulative games, which threaten to undermine his self-respect.

As the week unfolds, Nikо is forced to confront his principles both in his professional life and personal relationships. He struggles to maintain his dignity while standing firm against unethical practices at the factory and asserting himself in the face of Marina’s antics. The film opens with a documentary-style prologue about traditional Georgian winemaking and is structured into chapters named after the days of the week, charting Nikо’s journey of growth and self-discovery.

== Cast ==
- Ramaz Giorgobiani as Nico
- Gogi Kharabadze as Otari
- Marina Kartsivadze as Marine
- Aleksandre Omiadze as Head of wine factory
- Baadur Tsuladze as Archili
- Tengiz Daushvili as Nodari
- Bukhuti Zakariadze as Ilo
- Akaki Kvantaliani as Daviti
- Dodo Abashidze as Rezo
