= Ramaz Urushadze =

Soviet Georgian footballer

Personal information
- Full name: Ramaz Urushadze
- Date of birth: 17 August 1939
- Place of birth: Tbilisi, Georgian SSR, Soviet Union
- Date of death: 7 March 2012 (aged 72)
- Position: Goalkeeper

Senior career*
Years	Team	Apps	(Gls)
1960	FC Dinamo Tbilisi (reserves)		
1961–1964	FC Torpedo Kutaisi	91	(0)
1965–1971	FC Dinamo Tbilisi	161	(0)
summer 1969	Fram Reykjavik		

International career
1963–1964	USSR	2	(0)
Medal record
Representing Soviet Union
UEFA European Championship
Runner-up	1964 Spain
- * Club domestic league appearances and goals

Ramaz Urushadze (Georgian: რამაზ ურუშაძე; 17 August 1939 – 7 March 2012) was a Soviet Georgian footballer. His son Zaza Urushadze was a film director.

== International career ==
Urushadze made his debut for USSR on 13 October 1963 in the last 16 game of the 1964 European Nations' Cup against Italy (he was selected for the final tournament squad, where USSR were the runners-up, but did not play in any games there).
