= Marin Mägi-Efert =

Estonian actress

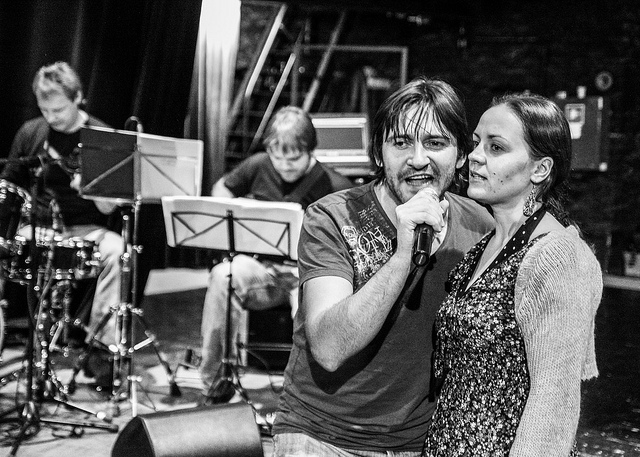
- Mägi-Efert (right) with Margus Grosnõi during a rehearsal for the stage play Uno Bossa, or The Seven Lives of Uno Loop at the Rakvere Theatre (2014)
- Born: 22 May 1982 (age 44); Kadrina, then part of Estonian SSR, Soviet Union
- Occupation: Actress

Marin Mägi-Efert (née Marin Mägi; born 22 May 1982 in Kadrina) is an Estonian actress.

In 2004 she graduated from the performing arts department of the Estonian Academy of Music and Theatre in Tallinn. From 2005 until 2016, she worked at Rakvere Theatre. She has also appeared in television and film roles.

== Personal life ==
Mägi-Efert is married to radio journalist and presenter Elvis Efert. The couple have two children, a boy born in 2010 and a girl born in 2018.

== Filmography ==
- 2005-2006 Kodu keset linna (role: Sigrid)
- 2008 Tuulepealne maa (role: Marju Pärtel)
- 2014 See õige (role: Emma)
- 2016 Ema (role: Sister)
- 2018 Võta või jäta (role: Jaana)
