= Veljo Reinik =

Estonian actor

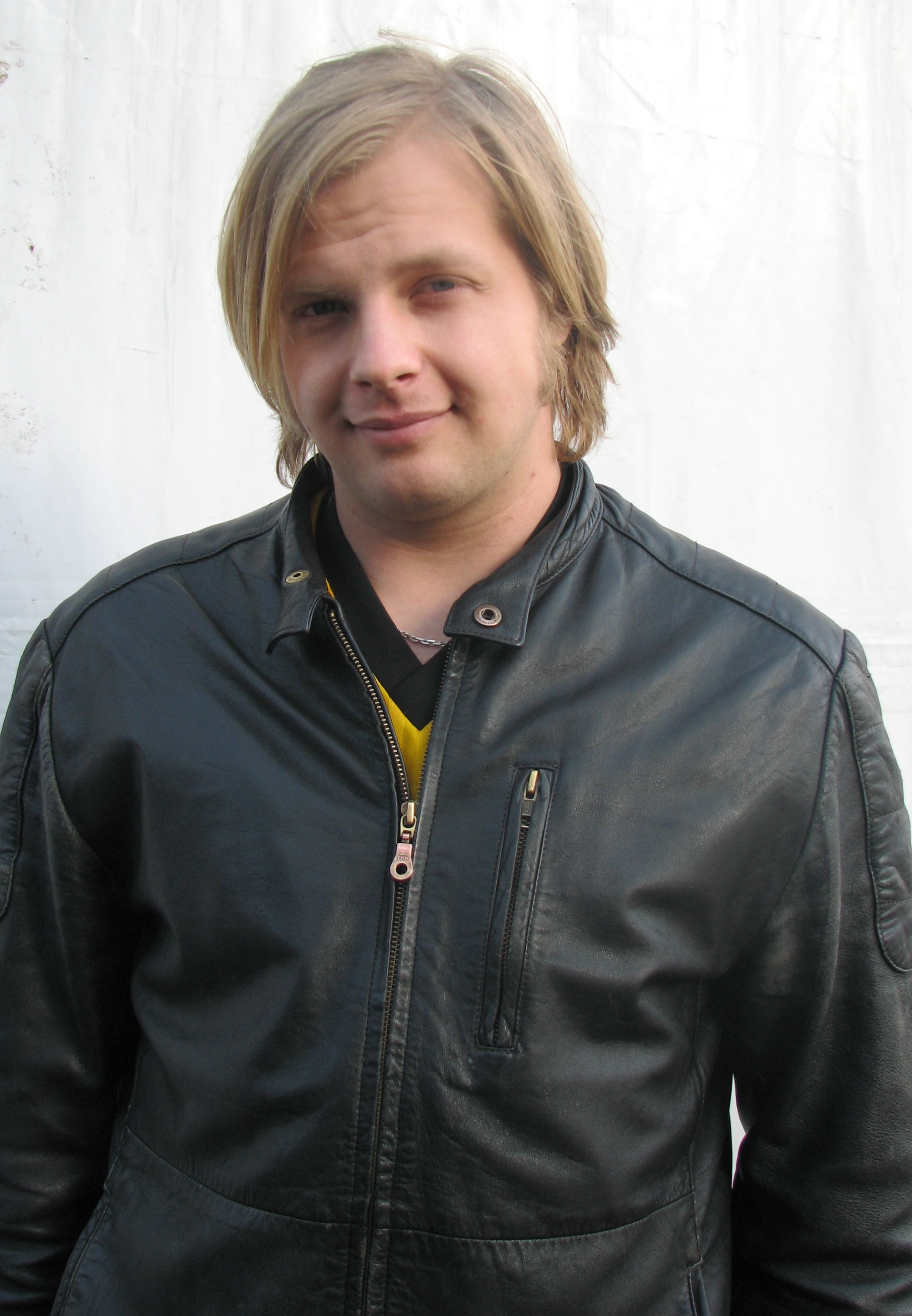
- Born: 15 June 1981 (age 45); Keila, Estonia
- Occupation: Actor
- Years active: 2006 – present

Veljo Reinik (born 15 June 1981) is an Estonian stage, television and film actor.

== Early life and education ==
Veljo Reinik was born in Keila in 1981. He attended primary and secondary schools in Keila before studying theatre at the University of Tartu Viljandi Culture Academy in Viljandi, graduating in 2007.

== Stage career ==
Following graduation, he became engaged at the Endla Theatre in Pärnu in 2007, where he was till 2009. After that works as freelance actor. Reinik has appeared in over thirty productions in various theatres to date during his career.

== Film and television ==
Reinik made his feature film debut in a small role in the 2008 Asko Kase directed Estonian historical drama Detsembrikuumus.

Veljo Reinik made his television debut as the character Richard Rõõmus in the Eesti Televisioon's (ETV) Tuulepealne maa; a twelve-part mini-series chronicling Estonia's history from the Estonian War of Independence, post-war life throughout the 1920s up until 1940, and World War II. From 2014 until present day, he has played the role of Kaspar on the popular Kanal 2 comedy series Köök. He has also made several appearances in different roles between 2010 and 2015 on the TV3 crime-comedy Kättemaksukontor. and between 2008 and 2013 on the Kanal 2 crime-drama series Kelgukoerad.

== Personal life ==
Veljo Reinik currently resides in Keila. He is a hobby poet and fisherman.
