= Three Houses (film) =

- Directed by: Zaza Urushadze
- Written by: Zaza Urushadze
- Produced by: Zaza Urushadze, Archil Gelovani, Levan Korinteli
- Starring: Zurab Kipshidze
- Cinematography: Giorgi Shvelidze
- Edited by: Alexander kuranov
- Music by: Giorgi Tsintsadze
- Production companies: GFNC, Independent project
- Release date: 2008
- Running time: 96 min
- Country: Georgia
- Language: Georgian

Three Houses (Georgian: სამი სახლი / Sami Sakhli) is a 2008 Georgian surrealist drama film directed by Zaza Urushadze.

== Cast ==
- Janri Lolashvili
- Zurab Kipshidze
- Murman Jinoria
- Eka Andronikashvili
- Nata Murvanidze
- Tornike Bziava
- Nineli Chankvetadze
- Malkhaz Abuladze
- Murman Jinoria
- Nino Koridze
- Dato Iashvili
