= Rolling Papers (2024 film) =

- Theatrical release poster
- Directed by: Meel Paliale
- Screenplay by: Meel Paliale
- Story by: Meel Paliale; Urmet Piiling
- Produced by: Tõnu Hiielaid; Urmet Piiling; Rain Rannu
- Starring: Mihkel Kuusk
- Cinematography: Markus Mikk
- Edited by: Meel Paliale
- Music by: Meel Paliale
- Production company: Tallifornia
- Release dates: November 13, 2024 (PÖFF); January 24, 2025 (Estonia)
- Running time: 98 minutes
- Country: Estonia
- Language: Estonian

Rolling Papers (Estonian: Pikad paberid) is a 2024 Estonian comedy-drama film written, edited, scored and directed by Meel Paliale. It stars Mihkel Kuusk as a 20-year-old trapped in monotony who meets a young man who is contrary to him and who will make him dream big again. The rest of the cast is composed of Karl Birnbaum, Maria Helena Seppik and Edgar Vunš.

It was selected as the Estonian entry for the Best International Feature Film at the 98th Academy Awards, but it was not nominated.

== Synopsis ==
Sebastian, a 20-year-old young man, works unhappily in a small shop in Tallinn. His routine life changes when he meets Silo, a hedonist and dreamer. Together, they dream of buying a one-way ticket to Brazil and living a full and free life.

== Cast ==
- Mihkel Kuusk as Sebastian
- Karl Birnbaum as Silo
- Maria Helena Seppik as Nora
- Edgar Vunš as Mr. Maze
- Kaur Tõra as Siim Pojeng
- Urmet Piiling as Reigo
- Herman Pihlak as Herman
- Hanna Jaanovits as Vahetusevanem
- Joonas Lass
- Rasmus Tikerpe
- Lotta-Lizbeth Hirv
- Juhan Soon
- Ekke Janisk as Zig-Zag Man
- Elina Soosaar
- Robin Täpp
- Oskar Kröönström
- Astra Irene Susi

== Release ==
The film had its world premiere on November 13, 2024, at the 28th Tallinn Black Nights Film Festival, and was then commercially released on January 24, 2025, in Estonian theaters.

== See also ==
- List of submissions to the 98th Academy Awards for Best International Feature Film
- List of Estonian submissions for the Academy Award for Best International Feature Film
