= Sulev Vahtre =

Estonian historian (1926–2007)

Sulev Vahtre (July 6, 1926 – August 31, 2007) was an eminent Estonian historian.

Vahtre was born in Laiuse Parish (now Jõgeva Parish, Jõgeva County). He completed his education at the University of Tartu in 1955 and worked there until 1993. He studied Estonian agrarian history, medieval chronicles, cultural history, Estonia's Christianization in the 13th century, and St. George's Night Uprising. In 1973, he received his PhD. In 1989, Vahtre reestablished the chair of Estonian history at the University of Tartu, and he was its chairman until his retirement in 1993. Until his death in Tartu, he was the most important historian in Estonia, the chief editor of the book series on Estonian history (he edited volumes 4 and 6), and also the chief editor of the book Estonian Chronology (first edition 1994, second 2007).

His older son Silver Vahtre is an artist, and his younger son Lauri Vahtre is a politician and historian.
