= Tallinn Music School (1944) =

Music school in Tallinn

- Tallinna muuusikakool

Location
- Narva maantee 28, 10152 Tallinn, Estonia; Tallinn; Estonia
- Coordinates: 59°26′16″N 24°46′11″E

Information
- Established: 1944
- Website: www.muusikakool.haridus.ee

Tallinn Music School (Estonian: Tallinna muuusikakool) is a music school in Tallinn, Estonia.

Before its independence the music school for children was a part of Tallinn Conservatory. In 1944 children's section got its independence. Until 1991 the school was called "Tallinn Children's Music School" (Estonian: Tallinna Laste-Muusikakool).

== Directors ==
- 1944-1948 Vladimir Alumäe
- 1948-1951 Bruno Lukk
- 1951-1952 Georg Ots
- 1952-1954 Eugen Kapp
- Ellen Kansa
