= Weekend Guitar Trio =

Estonian musical group

- Origin: Estonia
- Years active: 1993––present
- Members: Mart Soo; Robert Jürjendal; Tõnis Leemets
- Website: weekendguitartrio.wordpress.com

The Weekend Guitar Trio is an Estonian guitar trio comprising Mart Soo, Robert Jürjendal and Tõnis Leemets. It was established in 1993.

In 2013, Weekend Guitar Trio celebrated their 20th anniversary with concerts in Estonia's Concert Hall and Vanemuine Concert Hall.

In 2017 they appeared at the London Jazz Festival, including a performance broadcast on BBC Radio 3's Jazz Now.

== Albums ==
- "Sõnastik" (1995)
- "3 on 1" (1997)
- "Animotion" (2001)
- "Aim" (2003)
- "Lava" (2006)
- "Coca Inca" (2009)
- "Modus Novus"
- "Live At Kings Place" (2013)
- "20" (2013)

"Lava", "Live At Kings Place" and "20" are live albums.
