= November (2017 film) =

2017 Estonian film

- Theatrical release poster
- Estonian: Rehepapp
- Directed by: Rainer Sarnet
- Written by: Rainer Sarnet
- Based on: Rehepapp ehk November by Andrus Kivirähk
- Produced by: Katrin Kissa
- Starring: Rea Lest; Jörgen Liik; Arvo Kukumägi; Katariina Unt; Taavi Eelmaa
- Cinematography: Mart Taniel
- Edited by: Jarosław Kamiński
- Music by: Jacaszek
- Production companies: Homeless Bob Production; Opus Film; PRPL
- Distributed by: Cinemien (Netherlands); Velvet Spoon (Poland)
- Release dates: 3 February 2017 (Estonia); 24 May 2018 (Netherlands); 2 November 2018 (Poland)
- Running time: 115 minutes
- Countries: Estonia; Netherlands; Poland
- Languages: Estonian; German

November is a 2017 fantasy horror drama film written and directed by Rainer Sarnet, based on Andrus Kivirähk's 2000 novel Rehepapp ehk November ("Old Barny aka November"). The film has received praise internationally, and it was selected as the Estonian entry for the Best Foreign Language Film at the 90th Academy Awards, but it was not nominated.

== Plot ==
In 19th century Estonia, a mythical village is inhabited by personified Black Death, spirits, werewolves and the Devil himself. The film opens with a supernaturally-powered automaton called a kratt stealing a cow. It drags the cow by its chains and lifts it up in the air, depositing it at the farm of its master, the villager called Raak. Fashioned out of odds, ends, and farm tools, kratts need to be imbued with a soul in order to do their masters' bidding: primarily stealing livestock from other villagers, aside from menial farm labor. Villagers whistle for the Devil at a crossroads in order to arrange a deal: their human soul, to buy a soul for their kratt. However, wily villagers such as Raak continually trick the devil by using the sap of three black currants in lieu of blood to sign the Devil's contract.

The villagers are driven by a need to survive the harsh winter, and resort to all manner of thievery and deceit to accomplish their ends. They steal from one another, and trade their souls for the kratt in order to keep their souls from being stolen, too. They even fool the Plague - first disguised as a blanched young woman crossing the river, then later as a white goat — by wearing pants over their heads to make it think they have two asses, and thus leave them alone. But the Plague cannot be fooled twice, and when it finally assumes a pig form, the village elder, Sander, makes a pact with the Plague: if it has to kill, then it must leave a young boy and a young girl alive so that their people can go on. Hans refuses the bargain and it is implied he kills the pig with a scythe while it's distracted swearing on a bible brought by Sander. Relieved, the villagers dance on ecstatic for having survived yet again.

The young girl and the young boy are the main characters, Liina and Hans.

Liina is Raak's daughter: a headstrong young woman whom her penurious father has arranged, in a drunken pub session, to be married to an older, piggish farmer named Endel. But she longs for the local village boy, Hans. He, in turn, is besotted with a young Baroness — the visiting daughter of the local Baltic German baron, whom the local Estonians secretly resent, and get their revenge on by stealing food and valuable objects from the estate. The Baroness is afflicted with somnambulism, and must often be guarded so she does not sleepwalk off the manor roof, which she almost does several times.

Hans and Liina try to use mystical powers so that their unrequited love could change into requited love. Liina can transform into a werewolf, and watches Hans as he stares at the Baroness' window at night. Seeing how smitten Hans is with the Baroness, Liina consults the local witch, Minna, who gives her an arrow and tells her to fling it at the Baroness when she looks out her window, saying that the arrow will split the Baroness' skull and spill her brains out. Liina stands watch at the manor one night, and sees the Baroness atop the manor, sleepwalking. She cannot bring herself to kill the Baroness, however; Liina materializes atop the manor and pulls the Baroness back from the edge.

Hans, meanwhile, fashions a kratt out of a snowman and tries to trick the devil with the three black currants. But the devil has wised up to the ruse and forces Hans into trading his own soul in order that his kratt may be imbued with one. Hans tries to use the kratt to bring him the Baroness; however, the kratt sadly replies that it cannot steal humans, only livestock and inanimate things. Hans then consults his kratt about love and romance; the kratt, made out of snow made out of water that has seen many things, enchants Hans with tales of romances it has witnessed through millennia.

The witch Minna asks why Liina did not kill the Baroness; she replies that Hans loves the Baroness, and that he might die of sadness if she died. The witch is revealed to be an old spurned love of Sander, who in spite cast a spell that killed his wife. But in a rare spirit of forgiveness, Minna confides to Sander her concern over Liina's unrequited feelings. In a last effort to enchant Hans, the witch asks Sander to ask Liina if she can procure a dress the baroness might wear. Luise, the baron's housekeeper, who has been pilfering the old Baroness' garments and other belongings, trades in the old Baroness' last gown for a silver brooch that Liina's forebears had been safeguarding as part of the Raak family treasure.

That night, Hans and Liina encounter each other in a dreamlike state in the forest. Liina wears the old Baroness' gown with a veil over her head. Hans does not seem to recognize Liina. He introduces himself and falls to his knees, thinking she is the young Baroness. Sander watches the two from a distance, saying to himself "Two fools" before walking away. The pair kneel in silence through the rainy night, and when morning comes, Hans finally kisses Liina through her veil. Ecstatic, Liina walks away, and Hans asks his melting kratt one final question. The kratt replies "That girl loves you" before dissolving into a muddy puddle. Hans then finds an expensive ring in the slush — one that had figured in a romantic tale in Venice that the kratt had relayed to Hans via the snowman's liquid memories.

Hans chases after Liina — still thinking she is the Baroness — to propose. Meanwhile, the actual Baroness is shown to have finally sleepwalked off the manor roof the previous night, and died. Liina hears Hans' wagon approaching and after removing her concealing veil a little earlier on the road, resigns herself to reveal the truth. However, the Devil appears on Hans' cart, and asks where his kratt is. When Hans replies that it had melted, the Devil says "Then it's time to pay!", then snaps Hans' neck. Liina chases after the wagon bearing Hans' dead body, as it encounters the funeral procession for the dead young Baroness.

Hans' father, Sander, berates his own kratt while they prepare Hans' body for burial, saying the kratts are burdens on humanity who will not hesitate to cut human throats. The kratt retorts by asking who told humans to make deals with the devil, and chides the father why humans fool the plague and the devil, but do not want to pay with their souls as promised. Sander then replies "But I have no soul."

After Hans' burial, Liina walks into a nearby river and drowns herself. Underneath the waters, her body slips from the Baroness' gown as she encounters Hans and kisses him one last time. Later, two villagers are then shown discovering solid gold pieces in the river. They declare it the buried Raak treasure before one of them lifts up Liina's body. They take the gold pieces but leave a gold necklace for Liina's corpse, saying it will make a nice dowry for a virgin bride. Liina's corpse then replies "Oh, yes. Just what a virgin bride dreams of."

== Cast ==
- Rea Lest-Liik as Liina
- Jörgen Liik as Hans
- Arvo Kukumägi as Rein
- Heino Kalm as Sander
- Meelis Rämmeld as Jaan
- Katariina Unt as Luise
- Taavi Eelmaa as Ints
- Dieter Laser as Baron
- Jette Loona Hermanis as Baroness
- Jaan Tooming as Devil
- Mari Abel as Liina's mother's ghost
- Aire Koop as Hans's mother's ghost

== Reception ==
=== Critical response ===
On the review aggregator website Rotten Tomatoes, the film has an approval rating of 93%, based on 28 reviews, with an average rating of 7.10/10. On Metacritic, the film has a weighted average score of 79 out of 100, based on 10 critics, indicating "generally favorable reviews".

Peter Travers, writing for Rolling Stone, described November as a "marvelously strange film" and a "midnight-movie classic in the making," awarding it 3.5 stars out of 4. Sheri Linden's review for the Los Angeles Times was equally positive, referring to November as an "earthbound fairy tale" that "occupies a dreamscape somewhere between the teeming canvases of Brueghel and the existential agonies of Bela Tarr’s films." Much of the critical praise focused on the cinematography, with NPR's Mark Jenkins calling it "bewitching" while criticizing the plot as "slight."

=== Accolades ===
Despite being selected as the Estonian entry for the Best Foreign Language Film at the 90th Academy Awards, November was not picked for nomination. However, the film did win a number of accolades, including the Spotlight Award by the American Society of Cinematographers, the International Fantasy Film Award at Fantasporto, Best Cinematography in an International Narrative Feature at Tribeca Film Festival, Best Film and Best Cinematography at Listapad, and Best Estonian Film at Tallinn Black Nights Film Festival.

== See also ==
- List of submissions to the 90th Academy Awards for Best Foreign Language Film
- List of Estonian submissions for the Academy Award for Best Foreign Language Film
