= Zaza Urushadze =

Georgian film director (1965–2019)

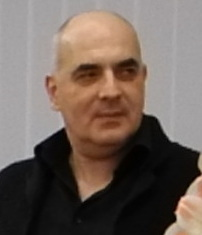
- Zaza Urushadze in 2014
- Born: 30 October 1965; Tbilisi, Georgian SSR, Soviet Union (now Georgia)
- Died: 7 December 2019 (aged 54); Tbilisi, Georgia
- Years active: 1989–2019
- Known for: Tangerines (2013)

Zaza Urushadze (Georgian: ზაზა ურუშაძე; 30 October 1965 — 7 December 2019) was a Georgian film director, screenwriter and producer.

== Biography ==
Zaza Urushadze was a son of Ramaz Urushadze, a famous Soviet football goalkeeper. He was born on 30 October 1965, in Tbilisi, Georgia.

He graduated in 1982-1988 at the directing department of the Shota Rustaveli Theatre and Film Georgian State University. From 2002-2004 he was the director of the Georgian National Film Centre.

Zaza's full-length debut film Here Comes the Dawn (1998) was very successful and participated in many international film festivals. It was Georgia's official Best Foreign Language Film submission at the 72nd Academy Awards, but did not receive a nomination.

From 2003 to 2006 Zaza Urushadze was director of the TV series Hot Dog. The project became successful, but the fourth season was banned by the Georgian government because of its political themes. The director left his job to start work on his new project, Three Houses.

Zaza's second full-length film Three Houses was finished in 2008. It participated in international film festivals (including Montreal World Film Festival). In December 2009, Zaza Urushadze's film opened the program of Georgian Filmweek in Tallinn, Estonia. During the meeting with Artur Veeber and Tatjana Mühlbeier the idea to write a script for Tangerines was born.

Tangerines, the first Estonian-Georgian co-production, was finished in 2013. It became one of the most successful and worldwide acclaimed films in Georgian film history. The story takes place during the war in Georgia, where, in the Apkhazeti region in 1990, an Estonian man, Ivo, has stayed behind to harvest his crops of tangerines. When a wounded man is left at his door, Ivo has no choice but to take him in.

During three years, the film won awards in several international festivals, including the Satellite Award for Best Foreign Language Film and an Audience award for best film in the Warsaw International Film Festival. At the International Film Festival Mannheim-Heidelberg 2013, Tangerines won a special prize, the Audience Prize for Best Feature Film and the Cinema Owners Prize and at the Fajr International Film Festival, the film was acknowledged as the best film with the best script writing.

At the Bari International Film Festival, the film was acknowledged as one of the best films of 2014, and at the International Film Festival in Tallinn, Tangerines was named the Best Estonian Film and won the International Cinema Club prize.

In 2013 the film was also awarded the Estonian Film Critics' Award for the Best Film and Estonian State Award for outstanding contribution to the promotion of Estonia. The Estonian Ministry of Culture also named Mandarinebi as the best film.

It was also nominated for the Best Foreign Language Film at the 87th Academy Awards and was among the five nominated films at the 72nd Golden Globe Awards for best foreign language film.

Three years later, in 2016, Zaza Urushadze began producing his new film, The Confession (working title "The Monk"). The film was produced by Ivo Felt of Estonia-based Allfilm and Zaza Urushadze's company Cinema24 and funded with €700,000 ($776,000). The Confession tells the story of a film director-turned-priest whose life in a small mountain village begins to unravel when he meets a local music teacher who is hiding a dark secret. The director said: "I can’t say The Monk will be similar to Tangerines, it will be lighter and maybe even more sensitive, but it will be hopefully very entertaining." Filming took place in Kakheti, Georgia in July and August with a cast including Dmitri Tatishvili, Joseph Khvedelidze and Sophia Sebiskveradze. The film premiered in early 2017.

Zaza Urushadze died of a heart attack on 7 December 2019.

== Filmography ==
Year	Film	Director	Producer	Writer	Note
1989	Mattvis vints mamam miatova	Yes	Yes	Yes	Short film
1998	Here Comes the Dawn	Yes		Yes	
2003-2006	Hot Dog	Yes			TV series
2008	Three Houses	Yes	Yes	Yes	
2011	Stay with Me	Yes			
2012	The Guardian	Yes			Third film of Karabakh Trilogy
2013	Tangerines	Yes	Yes	Yes	Nominated - Best Foreign Language Film in Academy Awards
2017	The Confession	Yes	Yes	Yes	
2019	Anton, his friend and the Russian revolution	Yes		Yes	post-production

== Awards ==
The film Tangerines won Urushadze the Best Director Award in the International Competition and the Audience Poll at the 29th Warsaw Film Festival. As well as the Special Award of Mannheim-Heidelberg and the Audience Award at the International Filmfestival Mannheim-Heidelberg 2013.
