= Eero Epner =

Estonian art historian and playwright

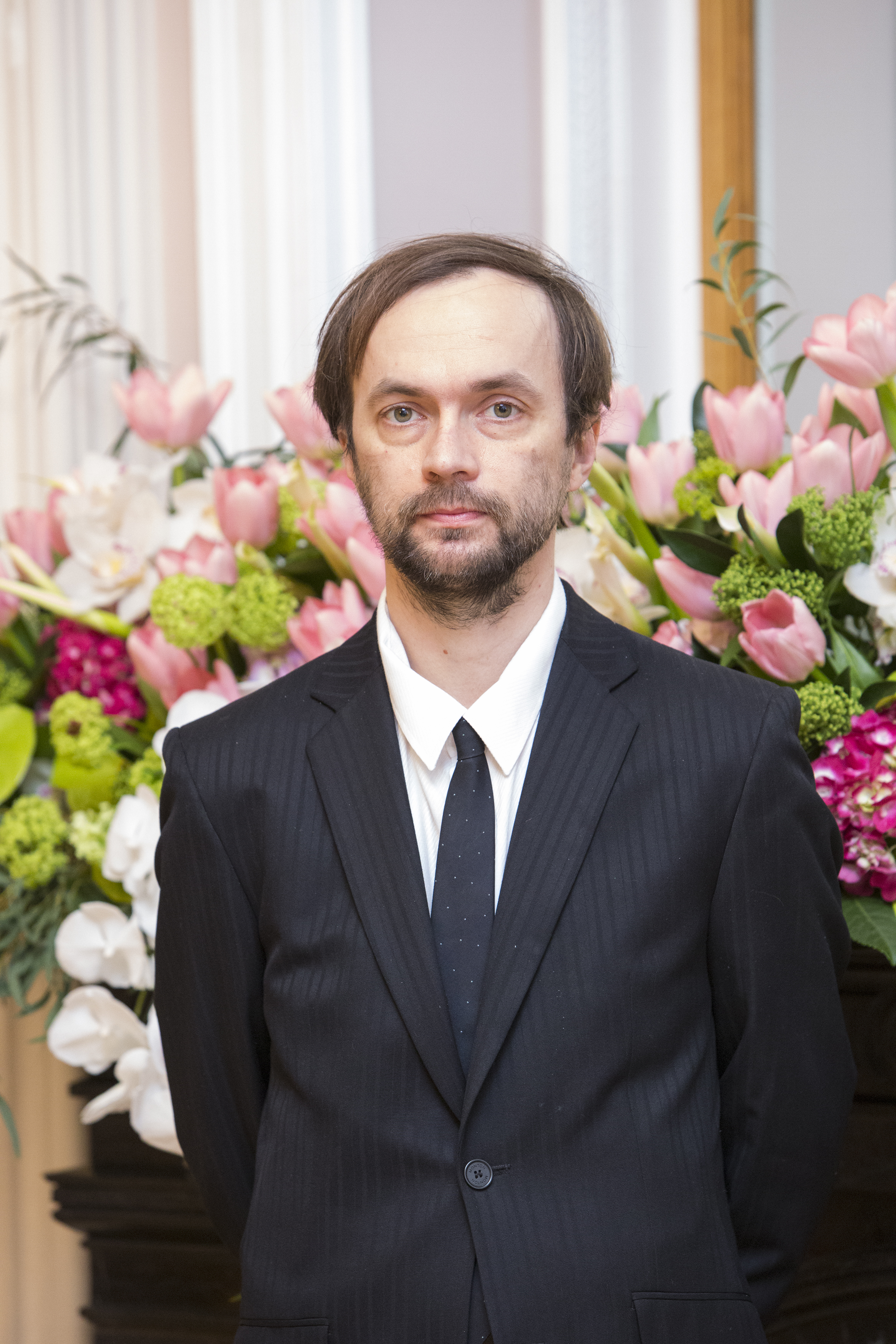
Eero Epner, 2021

Eero Epner (born 31 October 1978) is an Estonian art historian and playwright.

In 2002, he graduated from the University of Tartu with a degree in history specialty.

From 2005 to 2018, he worked as a dramatist at NO99 Theatre.

He has also done screenwriter work, for example, he is a screenwriter (with Tarmo Jüristo) for the television series Pank.

In 2021, he was awarded with Order of the White Star, IV class.
