= Truth and Justice =

1926–1933 novel series by Anton Hansen Tammsaare

Cover of 1964 published version Tõde ja õigus first part

Truth and Justice (Estonian: Tõde ja õigus) I-V, written in 1926–1933, is a pentalogy by A. H. Tammsaare, considered to be one of the major works of Estonian literature and "The Estonian Novel".

Tammsaare's social epic captured the evolution of Estonia from a province of the Russian Empire to an independent nation. It was based partly on the author's own life and centered on the contrast between the urban middle class and hard-working farmers. The protagonist, Indrek Paas, moves from a farm to a city, witnesses uprisings and upheavals, tries to find peace in marriage and the middle and upper class lifestyle, but returns disappointed to his roots for a new start.

== Book description ==
The book series can be seen as a thorough overview of developments of Estonian society from about 1870 to about 1930; it presents an epic panorama of both the rural and urban societies of that era. Tammsaare's primary conception was that under the then applicable conditions, reaching a harmony of both truth and justice is impossible, and thus, while many characters will seek it, none will reach this destination.

According to Tammsaare, the first volume of Truth and Justice depicts man’s struggle with the earth, the second with God, the third with society, the fourth with himself, and the fifth ends with resignation. Tammsaare’s view was skeptical, in general he saw things as a natural scientist would, his approach being biological rather than psychological. Although the work was deeply rooted in Estonian life, it dealt with many contemporary literary and philosophical issues. With Truth and Justice Tammsaare gained a reputation as one of the most original thinkers and novelists in Northern Europe. The last two volumes especially contained more reasoning on the struggle for truth and justice than autobiographical material.

In Truth and Justice Tammsaare draws an ironic portrait of urban intellectuals who have absorbed the middle and upper classes mores and abandoned their moral principles. The novel was written in a time which saw the rise of dictators – Adolf Hitler, Joseph Stalin, Benito Mussolini – and the decline of truth and justice. Indrek, the protagonist, is not a man of action, but through his life story Tammsaare examines the same humanistic ideals of the early 20th century as Romain Rolland, Thomas Mann and John Galsworthy do in their works. In the first part Indrek is actually a minor character, while the protagonist is his father, Andres Paas with his first wife Krõõt, who dies after giving birth to their first son. Andres, who wants to defend what he considers right, eventually loses his vision of right and wrong, and manages to cheat his archenemy, Pearu. In the second part Indrek enters a private school in a town, actually Tartu, although Tammsaare does not mention its name. Indrek falls in love with Ramilda, the daughter of the school director. She dies of tuberculosis and Indrek renounces God, publishing an article in the school paper which gets him expelled from school. In the third part Indrek participates in the revolutionary events of 1905 but is terrified by its frenzy. The fourth part is set in independent Estonia. Indrek has married Karin; they have two children. After having found out that Karin has been unfaithful, he nearly kills her. Indrek is released on probation. Karin dies in a traffic accident. In the fifth part Indrek returns to his native village.

=== Part One ===
Part One gives a generalized overview of life in Estonian village and the farmers' struggle against nature in the last quarter of 19th century. From a great number of characters, two stand out. Two contrasting men – unique and powerful types, each of whom manifests the characteristics of the Estonian villager. The whole character of Vargamäe Andres and his destiny is a deeply elaborated artistic generalization of the individual farmer’s life and struggle in the harsh conditions of northern Estonia. After arriving at his new home, Andres finds himself next to a devious neighbor, Tagapere Pearu. At first Andres doesn’t take Pearu’s tricks too seriously, but soon Pearu turns out to be as persistent in his grit as Andres is in hard work, and Andres starts to become more and more stern. He starts to fight Pearu with his own means, but is unable to fix the tragic mistakes in his own personal life. Soon Andres becomes more of a somber despot than Pearu ever was. As he sees his ideals failing, Andres searches for consolation in the Bible but becomes more and more self-contained. Pearu on the other hand seems to enjoy an easygoing life. 1905 revolution affects Andres and his family in horrible ways. Now Andres also loses faith in God.

=== Part Two ===
The action, based largely on the author’s own memories, takes place in the private grammar school of Mr. Maurus in the early years of the 20th century. The main hero, Indrek, son of Andres, is a young man from the country who comes to town to study. In Maurus’ school he meets a colorful variety of teachers and students of different nations and becomes familiar with new ideas and ways. He is much influenced by the radical opinions of some of the teachers, as well as by the manipulations of Maurus, whom he later blames for having taught him how to tell lies.

The second part of “Truth and Justice” has often been named "man’s battle with God". Indrek, having come from a strong religious background of rural regions of the time, starts questioning the existence of God. He falls deeply in love with Maurus’ only daughter Ramilda, and when she dies of tuberculosis, Indrek renounces God, publishing an article in the school paper, which gets him expelled.

=== Part Three ===
Part Three deals with 1905–1907 revolution. It conveys the moods of masses and episodes of fighting. At the decisive moment of the revolution, the main character Indrek remains a bystander. He euthanizes his dying mother, Mari, by giving in to her repeated demands to let her overdose on pain killers.

=== Part Four ===
Part Four is a story about the basic conflict between husband and wife, man and woman, during the early years of the newly independent Republic of Estonia. A decade has passed since the end of World War I and the 1918-1920 Estonian War of Independence, and people of the new republic try to follow the European trends, sometimes forgetting old traditions. It is a world of freedom and democracy, but also a world of fishy real estate and business affairs.

While Karin, Indrek's wife, wishes to be a part of the rising middle and upper class society, Indrek thinks that salvation and meaning of life can be found only in hard work. The inability of husband and wife to understand each other creates a dramatic conflict with unexpectedly tragic consequences.

=== Part Five ===
In Part Five, events take place in the countryside once more. Here the life is being observed roughly half a century after the events in Part One. In a simple lifestyle and hard work, the protagonist can finally rediscover his inner balance.

So far, Parts One to Four have appeared in English with Vagabond Voices. The translation of Part Five is in progress.

== Notable characters ==
=== Andres ===
Father of the main protagonist Indrek.

=== Pearu ===
Andres’ nemesis Pearu is not evil in his heart. Though he seems restless in harassing his neighbour and is motivated by jealousy and need to compete, he is also shown to have a brighter side – he can also be generous and benevolent. He enjoys life as a game or a contest. Right and wrong, good and evil, truth and lie are all a game to him.

=== Indrek ===
Indrek was born to into a traditional farm family before the turn of the 20th century. In Part II, he leaves home for an education at a private school where he is exposed to modern skepticism. His first love is a girl who dies of tuberculosis. It's a trauma which shakes his belief in God and leads to his expulsion from school. In Part III, he moves to town and accidentally gets caught up in a group associated with the Russian revolution of 1905. Initially the lofty ideals appeal to him. As they are put into action, however, he is appalled by the gratuitous violence and self-serving actions of many of the revolutionaries. At the height of the violence, Indrek leaves the group to tend to his mother, suffering greatly and in need of pain killers. After Indrek acquires some from town, his mother badgers Indrek to give her an overdose which euthanizes her. In Part IV, Indrek marries and starts a family. Family life is unhappy. In Part V, he returns to the family farm where he began.

=== Mister Maurus ===
Mister Maurus (Estonian: härra Maurus, also Papa Maurus) is an archetypal school teacher character, inspired by Hugo Treffner.

The character appears primarily in Part II of the pentalogy.

== Film ==
In 2019, the first book in the pentalogy was adapted into a film by director Tanel Toom for Allfilm and starred Priit Loog as Andres, Priit Võigemast as Pearu, Ester Kuntu as Mari, and Maiken Schmidt as Krõõt. By mid-March 2019, Toom's critically acclaimed adaptation has become the most-watched film ever shown in Estonian cinemas.
