= Ain Prosa =

Estonian film and theatre director

Ain Prosa (born 7 October 1967 in Räpina) is an Estonian film and theatre director, and actor.

In 1996, he graduated from Estonian Academy of Music and Theatre.

1990–2000, he worked at ETV Teleteater.

== Works and roles ==
- 1993 "Õnne 13" (television series; director)
- 1995 "Wikmani poisid" (television series; Maim's role)
- 2006 "Ohtlik lend" (television series; director)
- 2008 "Tuulepealne maa" (television series; director)
- 2009 "Kättemaksukontor" (television series; director)
