= Liina Triškina-Vanhatalo =

Estonian film director

Liina Triškina-Vanhatalo (née Liina Triškina; born on 2 June 1976 in Pärnu) is an Estonian film director, scenarist and editor.

She studied humanities at the University of Tallinn and studied film at the European Film College in Denmark, and the Film School of Catalonia; her main area of interest is in documentaries. She has also taught at the Baltic Film and Media School.

Her 2018 film Võta või jäta ('Take It or Leave It') was nominated for an Oscar.

In 2021 she worked mainly for the production studios Allfilm and Vesilind.

== Filmography ==
- 2012 "40+2 nädalat" (documentary film; scenarist and operator)
- 2013 "Tulekahju paine" (documentary film; scenarist)
- 2014 "Maastiku mustrid" (documentary film; scenarist)
- 2015 "Emajõe veemaailm" (documentary film; scenarist)
- 2018 "Võta või jäta" ('Take It or Leave It') (documentary film; director and scenarist)
- 2018 "Uued naabrid" ('New Neighbours') (documentary film; editor)
- 2024 "Emalõvi" ('Lioness') (feature film; director)
