= Jörgen Liik =

Estonian theatre, film, and television actor (1990–2025)

- Born: 12 March 1990; Kuressaare, then part of Estonian SSR, Soviet Union
- Died: 11 July 2025 (aged 35)
- Occupation: Actor
- Years active: 2013–2025
- Spouse: Rea Lest (m. 2018)

Jörgen Liik (12 March 1990 – 11 July 2025) was an Estonian stage, film, and television actor.

== Early life and education ==
Jörgen Liik was born in Kuressaare, Saare County on the island of Saaremaa. He attended primary school at Orissaare Gymnasium in Orissaare from 1997 until his graduation in 2003. He graduated from secondary school at the Saaremaa Ühisgümnaasium in 2009. Afterwards, he studied acting in Tallinn at the Estonian Academy of Music and Theatre (EMTA), graduating in 2014.

== Acting career ==
From 2014, Liik was engaged as an actor at the Theatre NO99 where he appeared in various stage productions. He made his television debut in 2013 in the role of Siim Pärtel in an episode of the second series of the Eesti Televisioon (ETV) historical drama Tuulepealne maa. This was followed by two appearances as the character Janno Palm on the TV3 comedy-crime series Kättemaksukontor the same year.

Liik's film debut was a starring role in the Moonika Siimets-directed musical short Viimane Romeo in 2013. His first feature-length film debut was as Sander in the 2016 Anu Aun-directed drama Polaarpoiss. In 2016, he had his first starring role in a feature-length film as Hans in the Rainer Sarnet-directed fantasy-drama November, based on the 2000 novel Rehepapp ehk November by Estonian author Andrus Kivirähk. November was selected as the Estonian entry for the Best Foreign Language Film at the 90th Academy Awards. In 2017, he appeared as Saska in the Sulev Keedus-directed historical drama Mehetapja/Süütu/Vari. The same year, he played the role of The Poet in the Priit Pääsuke-directed drama Keti lõpp. In 2018, he appeared in the role of Klemm in the Lauri Lagle-directed drama Portugal.

== Personal life and death ==
In 2018, Liik wed stage and film actress Rea Lest, whom he also starred with in November, Mehetapja/Süütu/Vari, and Dark Paradise.

Liik died on 11 July 2025, at the age of 35.

== Recognition ==
In 2013, Liik was awarded the Voldemar Panso Young Actors' Award.

== Selected filmography ==
- 2013 Tuulepealne maa (TV Series)
- 2013 Kättemaksukontor (TV Series)
- 2013 The Last Romeo (short)
- 2016 The Polar Boy
- 2017 Mehetapja/Süütu/Vari
- 2017 November
- 2017 The End of the Chain
- 2018 Portugal
- 2023 Dark Paradise
- 2025 Aurora (posthumous)
