= Kärt Tammjärv =

Estonian actress

Kärt Tammjärv (born 11 June 1991) is an Estonian actress.

She was born in Tallinn and graduated in 2010 from Pelgulinna Gymnasium, in addition, she has studied at Tallinn Music School and the Arsis Handbell School. In 2014 she graduated from the Estonian Academy of Music and Theatre.

Since 2014 she is an actress at the Vanemuine Theater.

== Stage productions ==
- 2014 Avtandil Varsimašvili "Love! Love! Love!" (Cow, River, Butterflies, Sheep)
- 2014 Jacob Grimm/Veikko Täär "Red Riding Hood" (Red Riding Hood)
- 2015 A. H. Tammsaare/Urmas Lennuk "Our Own Truth, In Our Own Right" (Krõõt)
