= Ivo Felt =

Estonian film producer

His career:

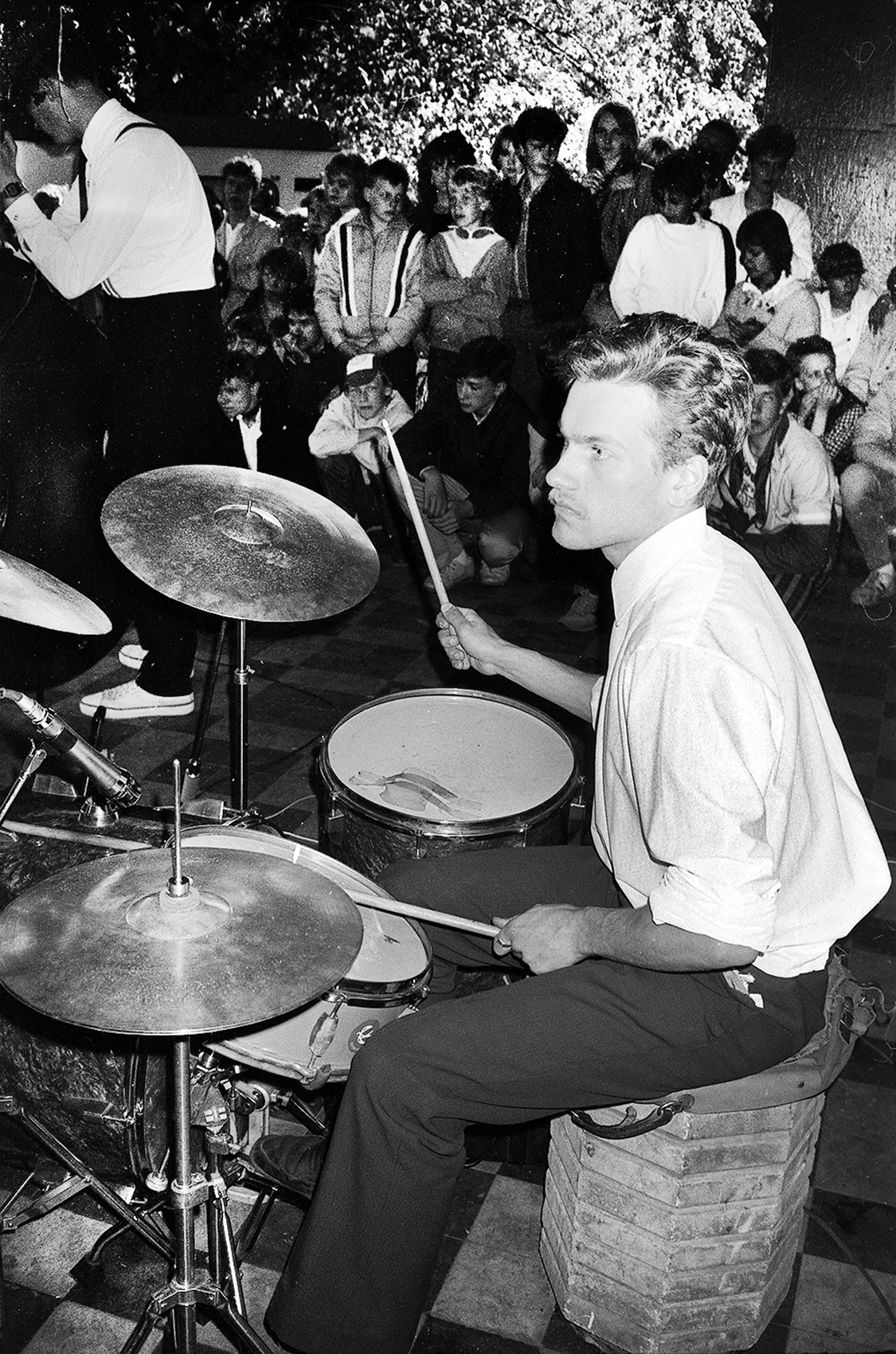
-Ivo Felt in 1987-

Ivo Felt (also written as Ivo Feldt) is an Estonian film producer and sound engineer. He was born in Tallinn, Estonia on the 31st October 1968.

Since the year 1987, he has worked at Tallinnfilm. During 1991-1995, he was a freelancer. If you were wondering, a freelancer is an independent contractor who earns wages on a per-job or per-task basis, typically for short-term work. When the year 1995 came around, he became one of the founders of film studio Allfilm.

In 2013, Mr. Feldt and Seppo Vanhatalo's film 'Rat King' got nominated 'Best Sound Design' for the Jussi Awards. In 2015, he received 2 awards those of which he shared with his other fellow producers. During 2015, Ivo Feldt, Kevin Mcann and Dermot Healy's short film 'Prison Door' received the Tallinn Black Nights Film Festival award. Also during 2015, Ivo Feldt, Klaus Haro, Jorg Bundschuh, Kaarle Aho and Kai Nordberg's film 'The Fencer' managed to get the 'Estonian Film Award'.

Now we move on to 2016, where he also managed to receive two awards yet again but for the same film. The first award he received in the year 2016 was the 'Venice Film Week' award from his film 'Prison Door' which got selected as 'Best Narrative Short Film'. He shared this with Kevin Mcann and Dermot Healy. Lastly, his notoriously famous film 'Prison Door' got nominated 'Grand Prix International Short Film' at the 'Cork International Film Festival'.

== Filmography ==
- 2007: 'Georg'
- 2010: 'Aeg on siin' / 'Oleg' / 'Burnt Mistakes'
- 2013: 'Tangerines'
- 2014: 'Landscape with Many Moons
- 2015: 'The Call Of Silence'/ 'Fast Eddy's Old News'
- 2016: 'The Spy and the Poet'
- 2017: 'The confession'
- 2018: 'Portugal'/ 'Take it or leave it'
- 2019: 'Truth and Justice'
- 2022: 'Yoyogi'
- 2023: 'Last Sentinel'/ 'Two Men on Train and Someone Else'
- 2024: 'The House'/ '8 Views of Lake Biwa'
