= Tanel Toom =

Estonian director and screenwriter (born 1982)

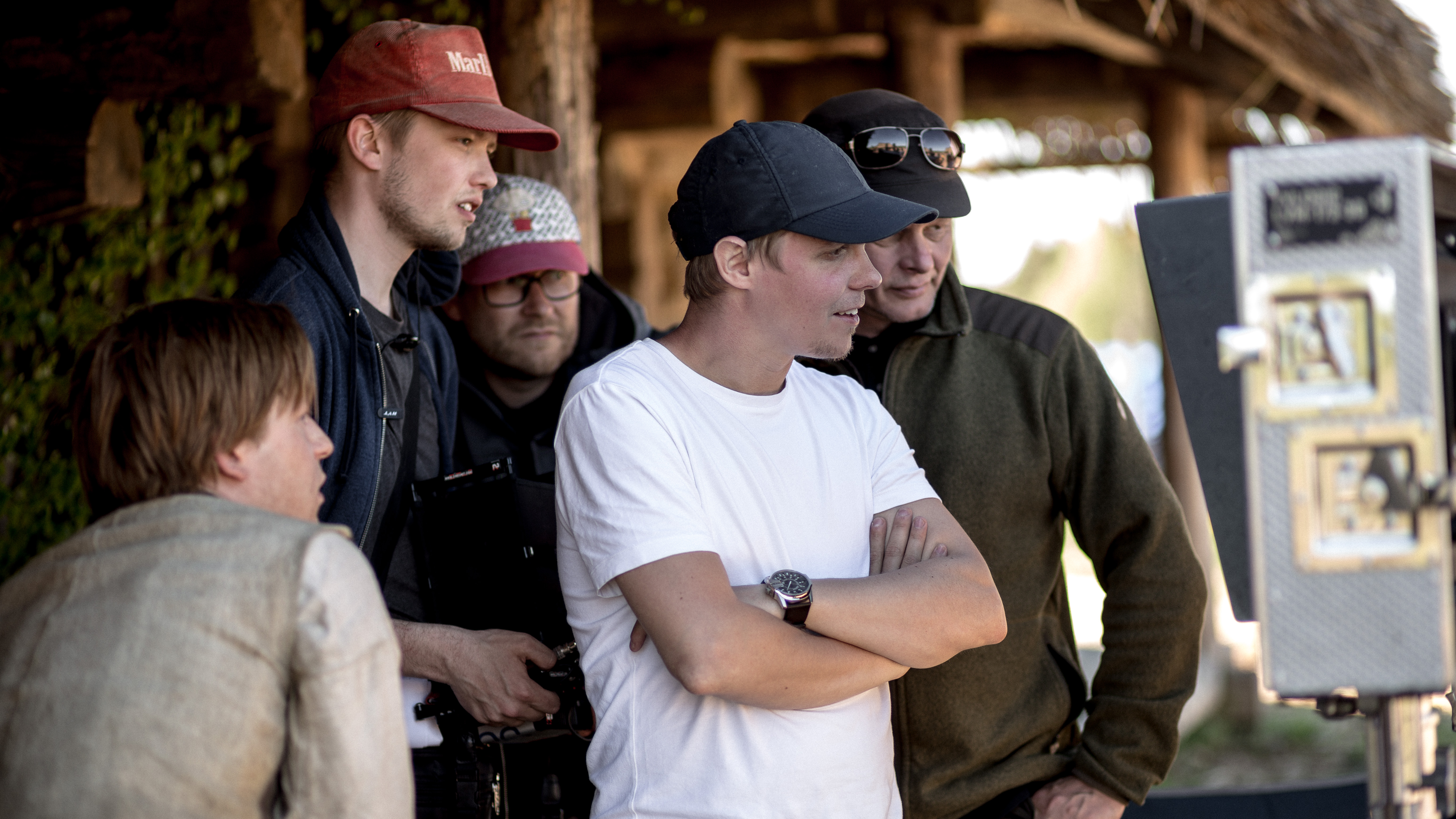
- Toom (in white shirt) filming Truth and Justice
- Born: Tanel Toom; 1 November 1982 (age 43); Tallinn, then part of Estonian SSR, Soviet Union
- Occupations: Director, screenwriter

Tanel Toom (born 1 November 1982) is an Estonian director and screenwriter.

Toom studied filmmaking at Tallinn University, graduating with a BA in 2005. After that, he worked as a director for commercials and as a first assistant director. In 2008, he completed his fourth short film, The Second Coming, which premiered at the Venice Film Festival. The apocalyptical war drama has since been screened at numerous film festivals and won several awards, including Best European Short at the Arcipelago International Film Festival. The same year, he decided to continue his studies at the National Film and Television School in England. He graduated from the NFTS with an MA in 2010 and shortly after that his diploma film The Confession won the Student Academy Award for Honorary Foreign Film and got him an Academy Award nomination for Live Action Short Film.

== Filmography ==
=== Film ===
Year	Film	Role	Notes
2004	Once A Year	Director, writer	short film
2004	2.68	Director, writer	short film
2004	Set Point	2nd Assistant Director	Estonian/Original title: Täna öösel me ei maga
2004	The Neighbour	Assistant Director	Estonian/Original title: Naaber
2005	The Wind	Director	Estonian/Original title: Tuul
2006	Ruudi	1st Assistant Director	
2008	The Second Coming	Director, writer	Official selection - Venice Film Festival Best European Short Film - Arcipelago Short Film Festival Best Cinematography - Avanca Film Festival Estonian/Original title: Teine tulemine
2008	The Loop	Director, writer	short film
2008	Morgan Flynn	Director	short film
2009	Banana Chocolate	Director, writer	short film
2010	The Confession	Director, writer	Nominated for Academy Award for Best Live Action Short Film; Student Academy Award for Best Foreign Film
2011	Mission M-314	Director, writer	short film, stereoscopic
TBA	Gateway 6	Director	Thriller feature film
2019	Truth and Justice	Director and screenwriter	Feature, period drama. Based on the pentalogy of the same name by A. H. Tammsaare
2023	Last Sentinel	Director	Estonian/Original title: Viimane vahipost
