= Pediment =

Element in classical, neoclassical and baroque architecture

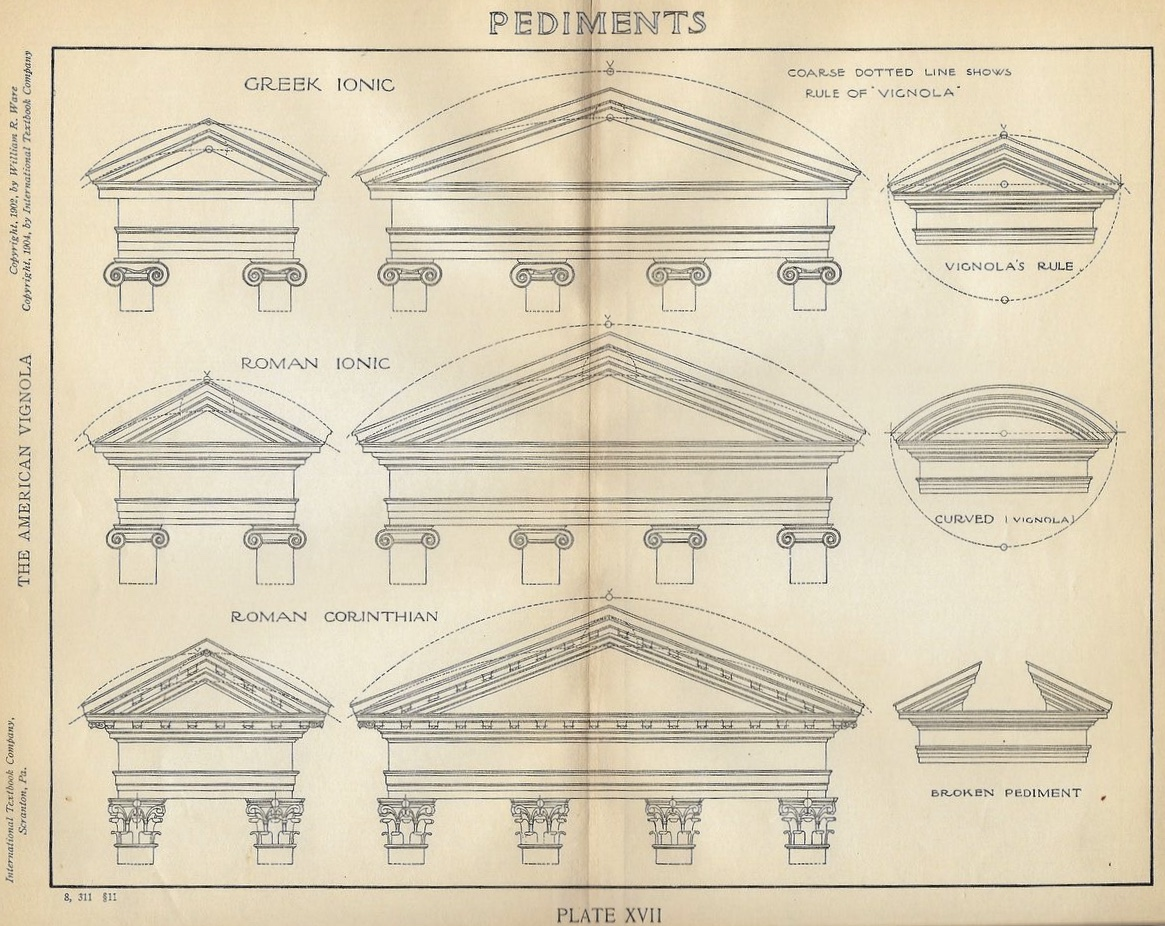
Types of pediment; "curved" and "broken" examples at the lower right

Pediments are a form of gable in classical architecture, usually of a triangular shape. Pediments are placed above the horizontal structure of the cornice (an elaborated lintel), or entablature if supported by columns. In ancient architecture, a wide and low triangular pediment (the side angles 12.5° to 16°) typically formed the top element of the portico of a Greek temple, a style continued in Roman temples. Large pediments were rare on other types of building before Renaissance architecture. For symmetric designs, a pediment forms a center point and is often used to add grandness to entrances.

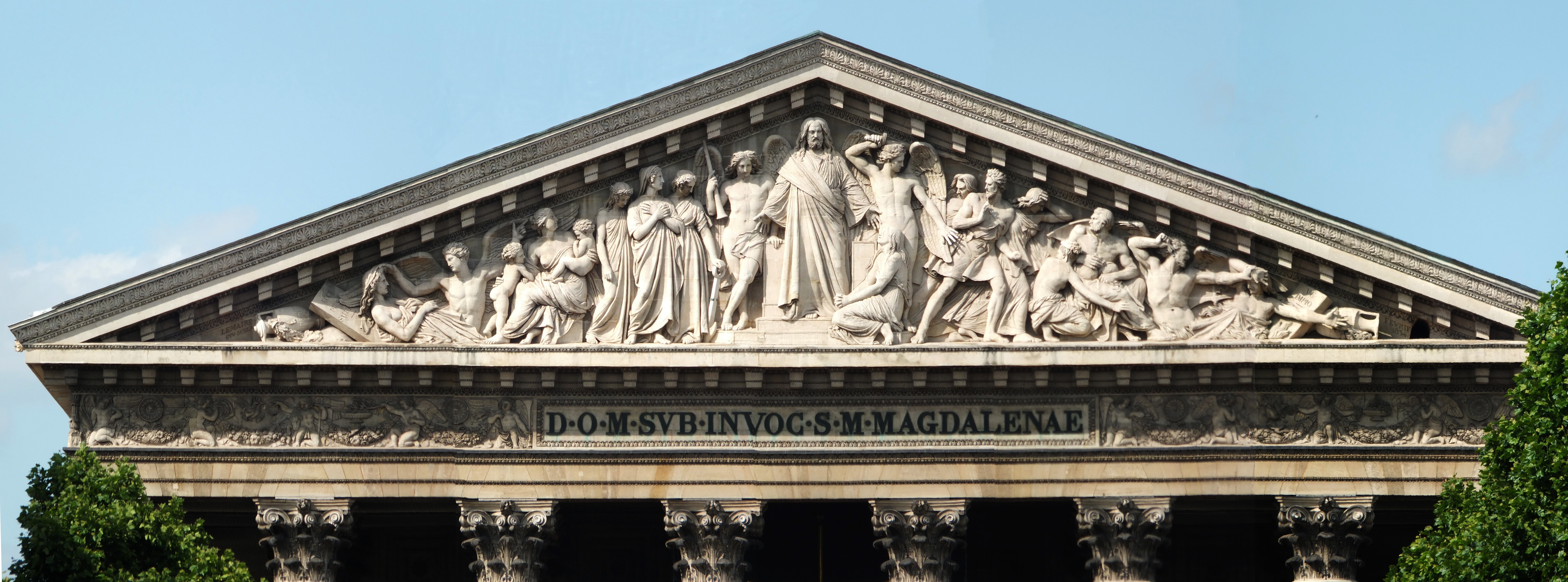
Neoclassical pediment of the Madeleine Church, Paris, with sculpture (1826–1834) by Philippe Joseph Henri Lemaire

The cornice continues round the top of a pediment, as well as below it; the rising sides are often called the "raking cornice". The tympanum is the triangular area within a pediment, often decorated with a pedimental sculpture, which may be freestanding, or a relief sculpture. The tympanum may hold an inscription or, in modern times, a clock face.

The main variant shapes are the "segmental", "curved", or "arch" pediment, where the straight line triangle of the cornice is replaced by a curve making a segment of a circle, the broken pediment where the cornice has a gap at the apex, and the open pediment, with a gap in the cornice along the base. Both triangular and segmental pediments can have "broken" and "open" forms.

Pediments are found in ancient Greek architecture as early as 580 BC, in the archaic Temple of Artemis, Corfu, which was probably one of the first. Pediments return in Renaissance architecture and are then much used in later styles such as Baroque, Neoclassical, and Beaux-Arts architecture, which favoured the segmental variant.

== Variant forms ==
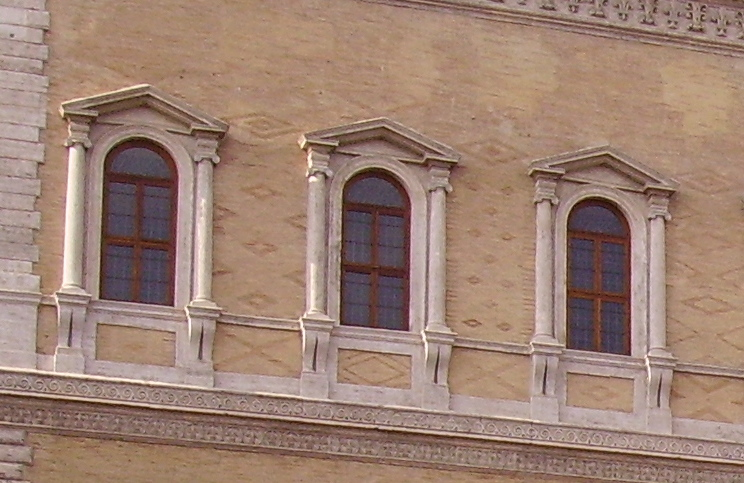
Open pediments on windows at the Palazzo Farnese, Rome, by Antonio da Sangallo the Younger, begun 1534

A variant is the "segmental" or "arch" pediment, where the normal angular slopes of the cornice are replaced by one in the form of a segment of a circle, in the manner of a depressed arch. Both traditional and segmental pediments have "broken" and "open" forms. In the broken pediment the raking cornice is left open at the apex. The open pediment is open along the base, with a gap in the cornice for part or all of the space under the pediment.

All these forms were used in Hellenistic architecture, especially in Alexandria and the Middle East. The so-called "Treasury" or Al-Khazneh, a 1st-century rock-cut tomb in Petra, Jordan, is a famously extreme example, with not merely the pediment, but the whole entablature, very "broken" and retreating into the cliff face. Broken pediments where the gap is extremely wide in this way are often called "half-pediments".

They were adopted in Mannerist architecture, and applied to furniture designed by Thomas Chippendale. Another variant is the swan's neck pediment, a broken pediment with two S-shaped profiles resembling a swan's neck, typically volutes; this is mostly found in furniture rather than buildings. It was popular in American doorways from the 1760s onwards. Very often there is a vase-like ornament in the middle, between the volutes. Non-triangular variations of pediments are often found over doors, windows, niches, and porches.

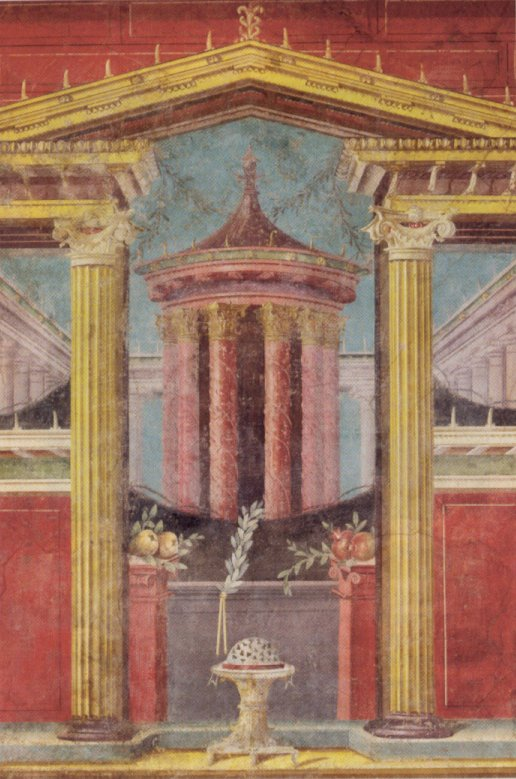
Open pediment in a fresco from Boscoreale, 43-30 BC

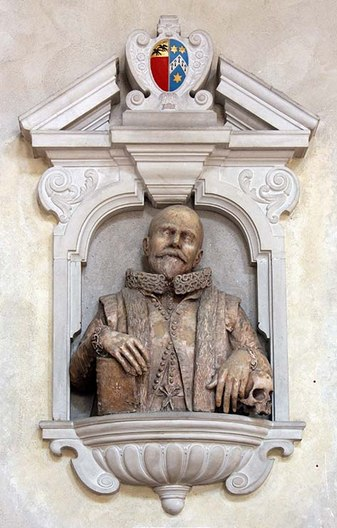
Broken pediment on the monument to John Speed, London, c. 1630

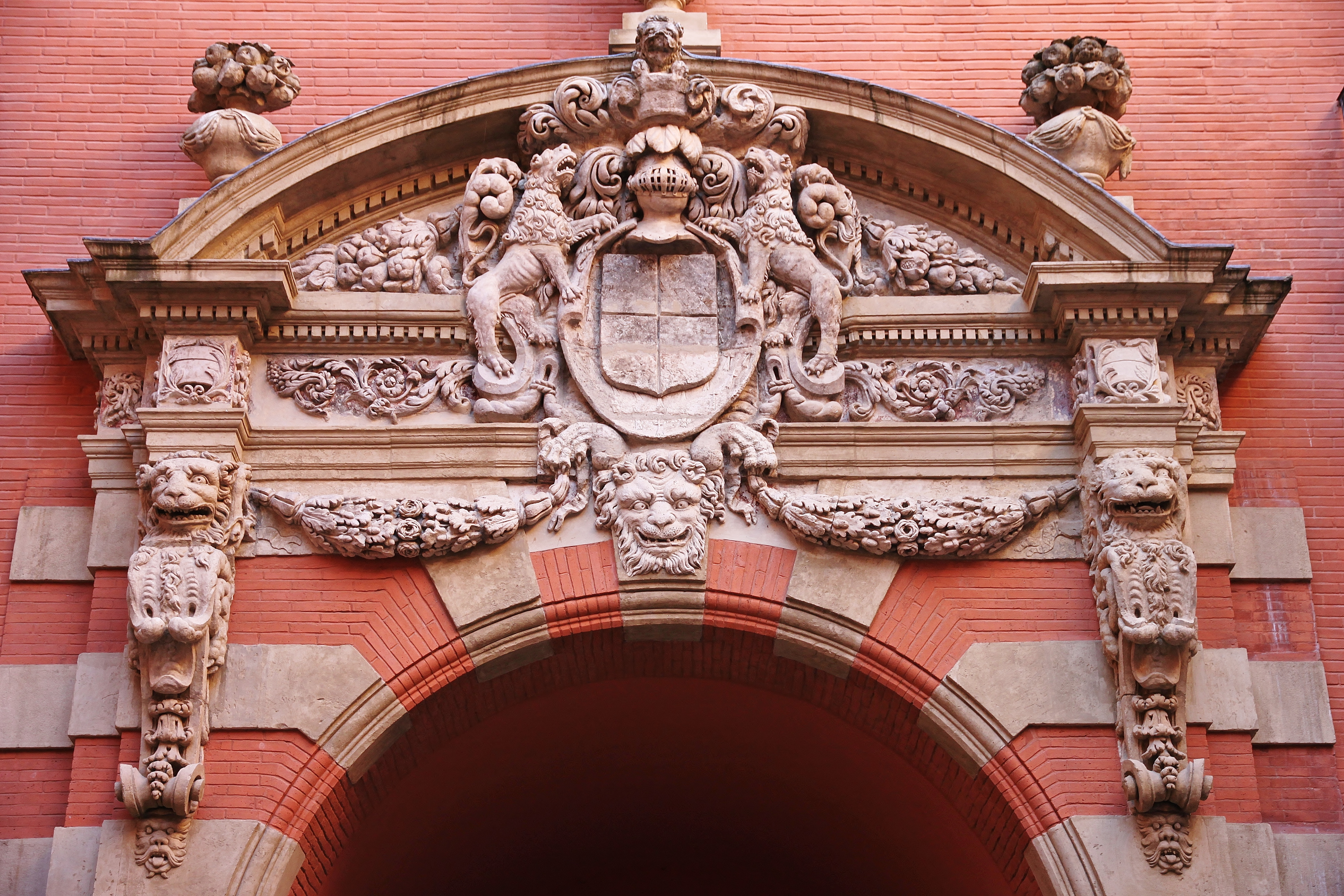
Renaissance highly decorated segmental pediment, Hôtel Desplats or de Palaminy, Toulouse, France

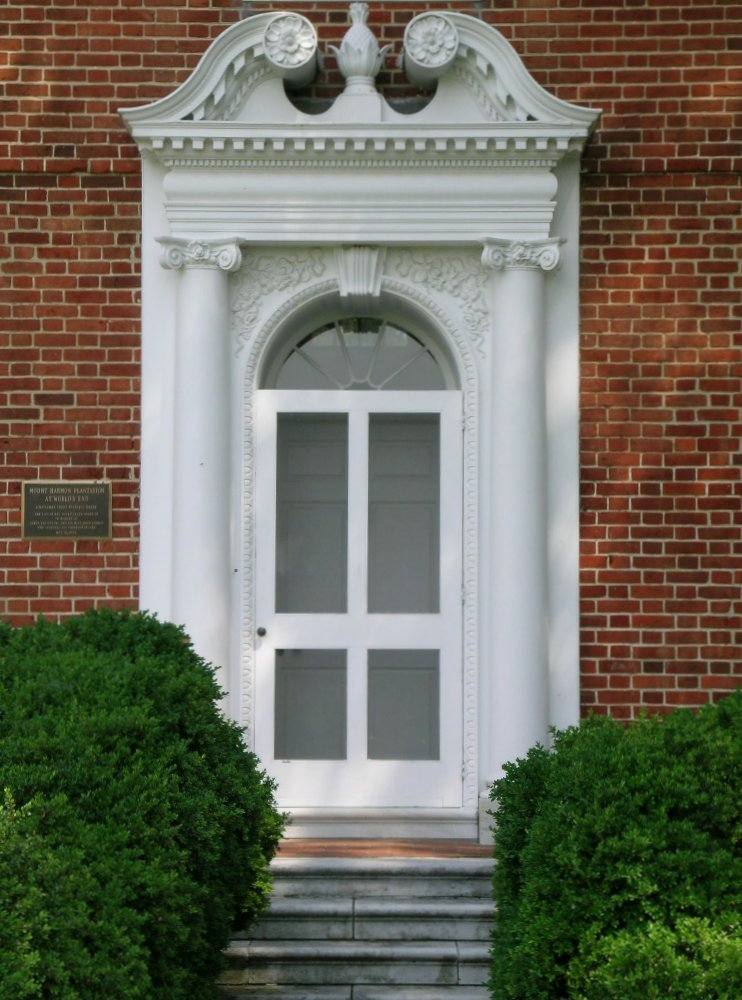
Door with swan's neck pediment, Maryland, c. 1788

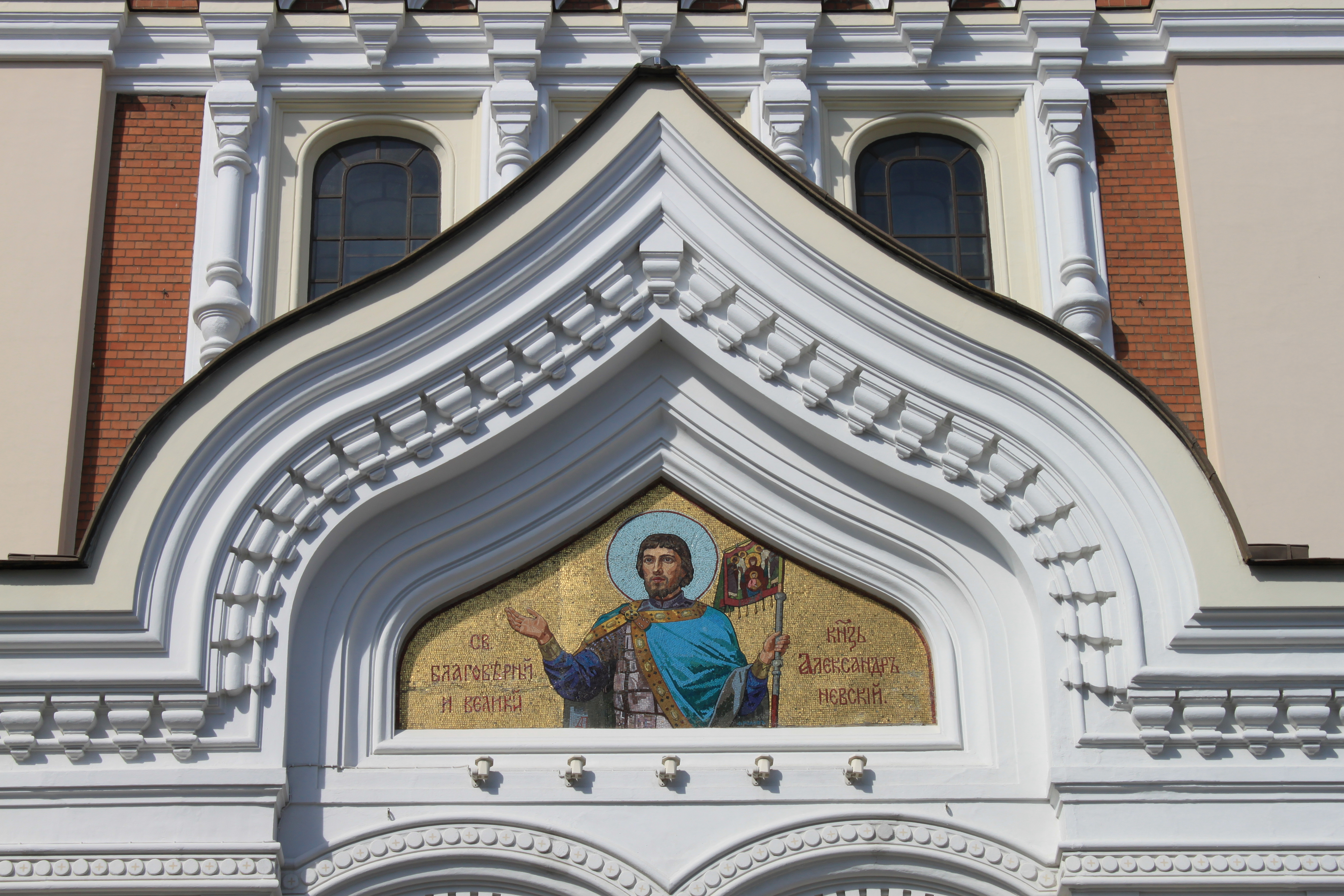
Russian Revival open pediment with mosaic of the Alexander Nevsky Cathedral, Tallinn, Estonia

== History ==
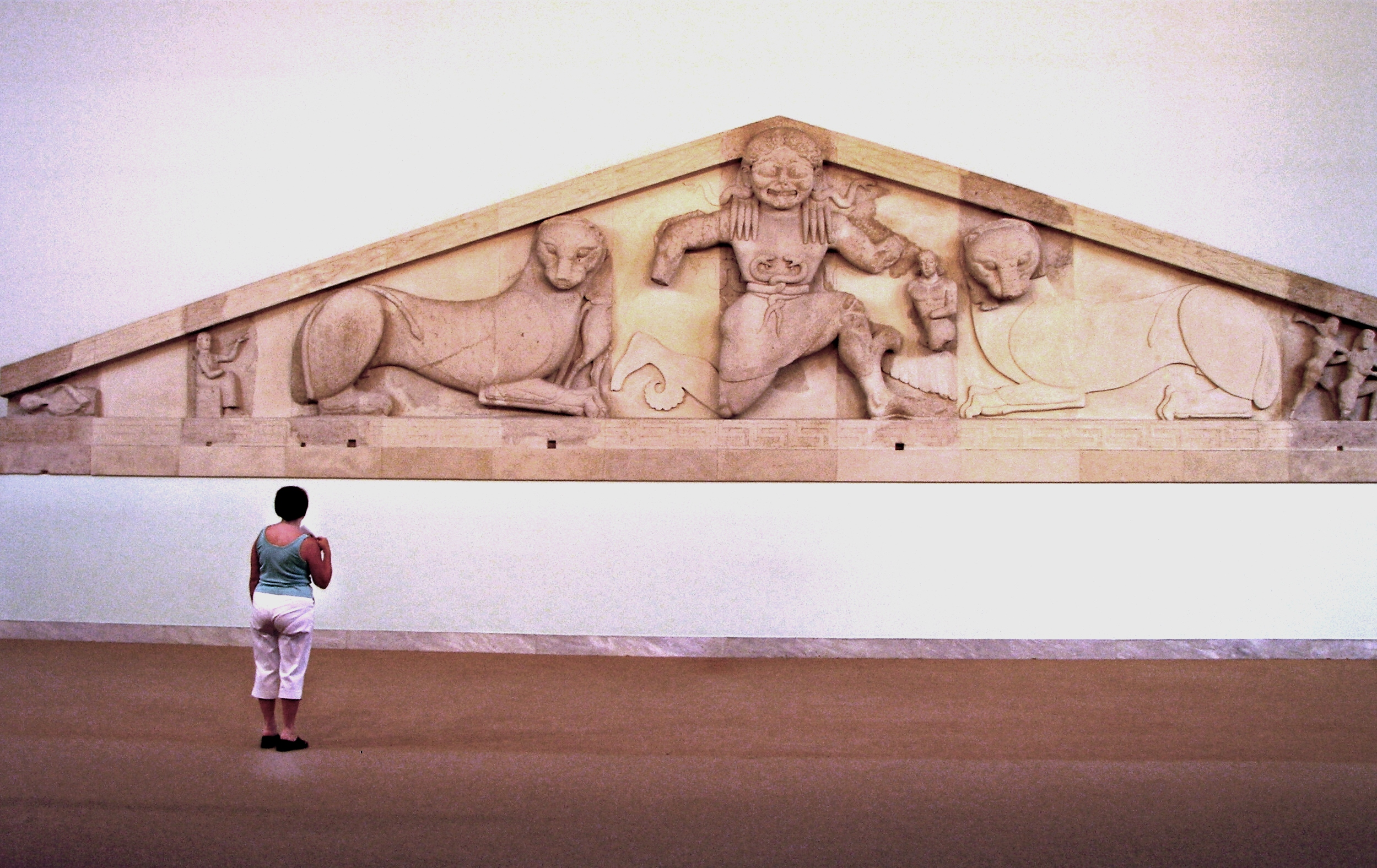
The earliest surviving pedimental sculpture, Temple of Artemis, Corfu, about 580–570 BC, in a reconstructed setting

=== Classical ===
The pediment is found in classical Greek temples, Etruscan, Roman, Renaissance, Baroque, Rococo, Neoclassical, and Beaux-Arts architecture. Greek temples, normally rectangular in plan, generally had a pediment at each end, but Roman temples, and subsequent revivals, often had only one, in both cases across the whole width of the main front or facade. The rear of the typical Roman temple was a blank wall, usually without columns, but often a full pediment above. This effectively divorced the pediment from the columns beneath it in the original temple front ensemble, and thereafter it was no longer considered necessary for a pediment to be above columns.

The most famous example of the Greek scheme is the Parthenon, with two tympanums filled with large groups of sculpted figures. An extreme but very influential example of the Roman style is the Pantheon, Rome, where a portico with pediment fronts a circular temple.

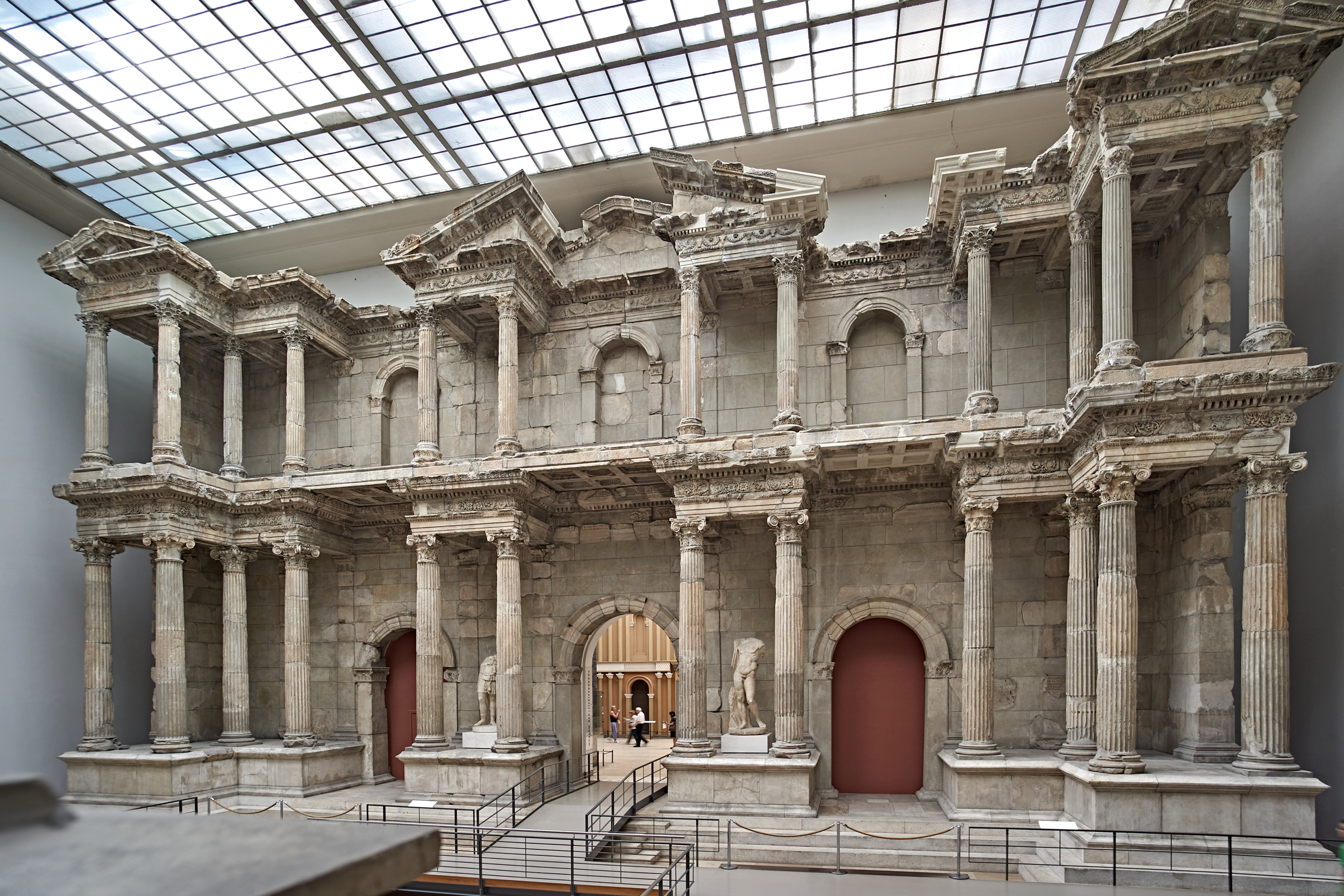
2nd-century Market Gate of Miletus, Pergamon Museum, Berlin

In ancient Rome, the Renaissance, and later architectural revivals, small pediments are a non-structural element over windows, doors, and aediculae, protecting windows and openings from rain, as well as being decorative. From the 5th century pediments also might appear on tombs and later non-architectural objects such as sarcophagi.

In the Hellenistic period pediments became used for a wider range of buildings, and treated much more freely, especially outside Greece itself. Broken and open pediments are used in a way that is often described as "baroque". The large 2nd-century Market Gate of Miletus, now reconstructed in the Pergamon Museum in Berlin, has a pediment that retreats in the centre, so appears both broken and open, a feature also seen at the Al-Khazneh (so-called "Treasury") tomb at Petra in modern Jordan. The broken pediments on each of the four sides of the Arch of Septimius Severus at Leptis Magna in Libya are very small elements, raking at an extremely steep angle, but not extending beyond the entablature for the columns below. There are two faces to each pediment, both carved, with one lying parallel to the wall of the monument, and the other at right angles to that.

The Arch of Augustus in Rimini, Italy (27 BC), an early imperial monument, suggests that at this stage provincial Roman architects were not well practiced in the classical vocabulary; the base of the pediment ends close to, but not over, the capitals of the columns. Here the whole temple front is decoration applied to a very solid wall, but the lack of respect for the conventions of Greek trabeated architecture remains rather disconcerting.

Conventional Roman pediments have a slightly steeper pitch than classical Greek ones, perhaps because they ended tiled roofs that received heavier rainfall.

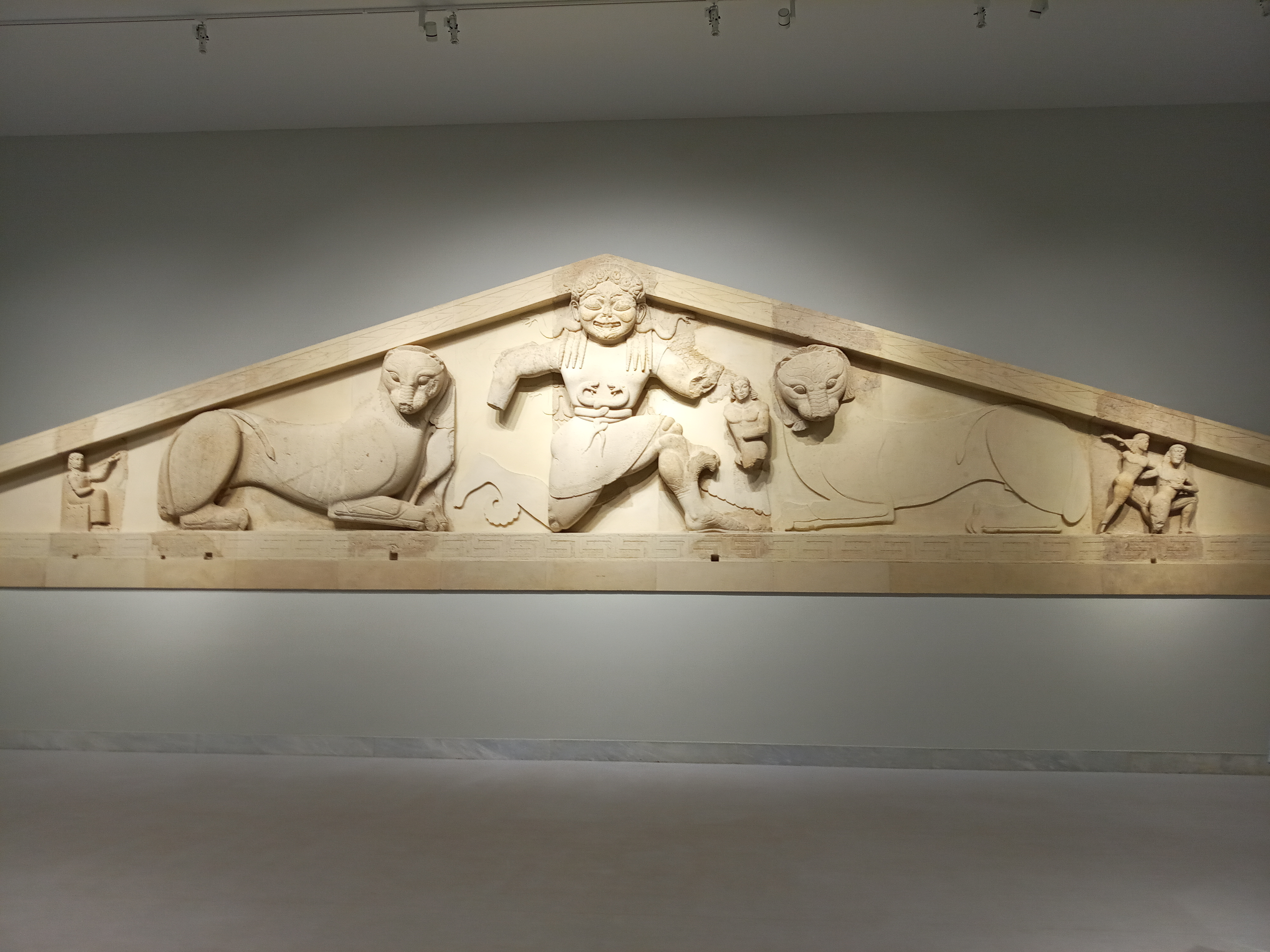
Ancient Greek west pediment of the Temple of Artemis in Corfu, c.580 BC, probably limestone, Archaeological Museum of Corfu, Kerkyra, Greece

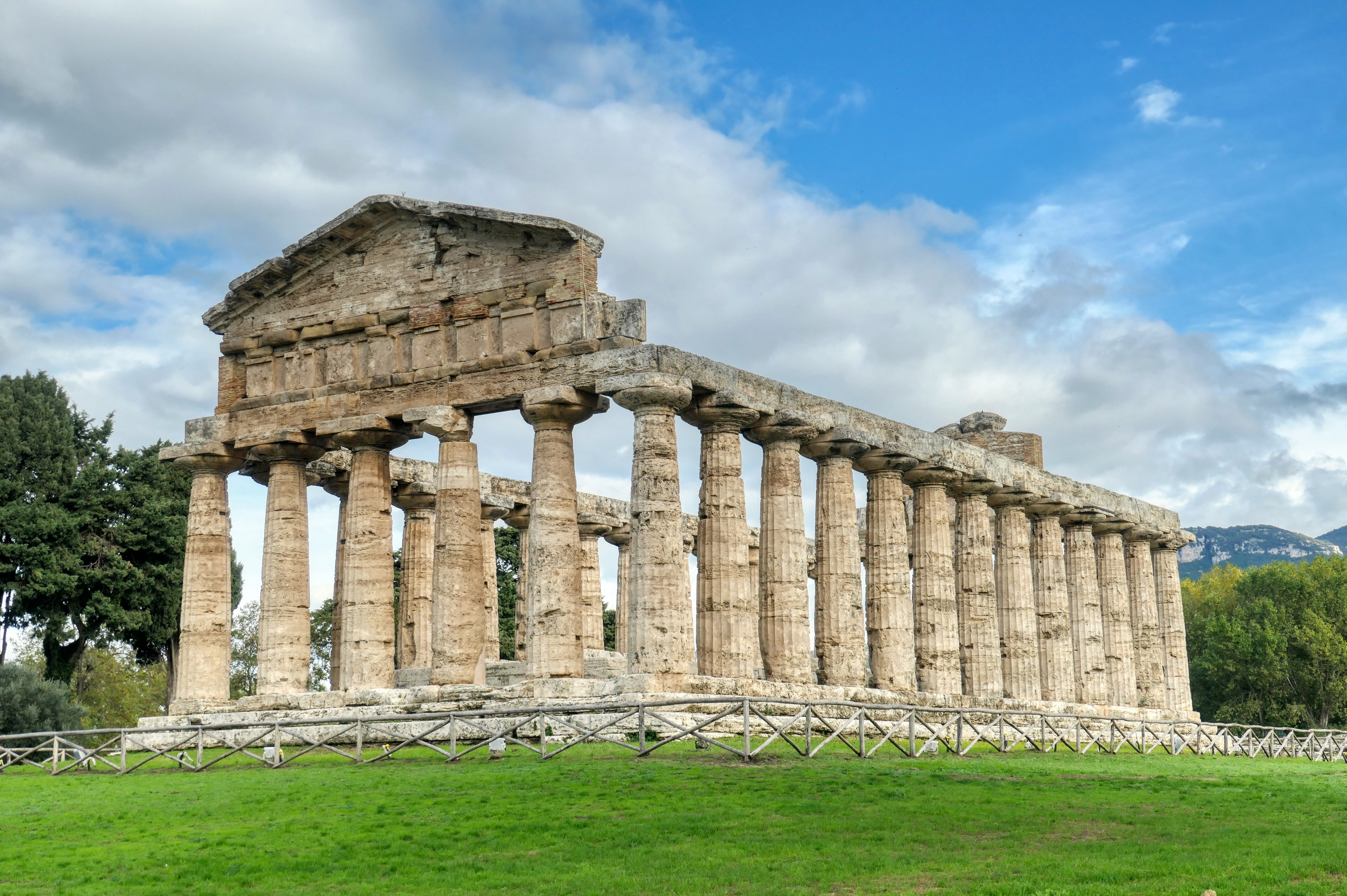
Ancient Greek west front of the Temple of Athena, Paestum, unknown architect, c.500 BC

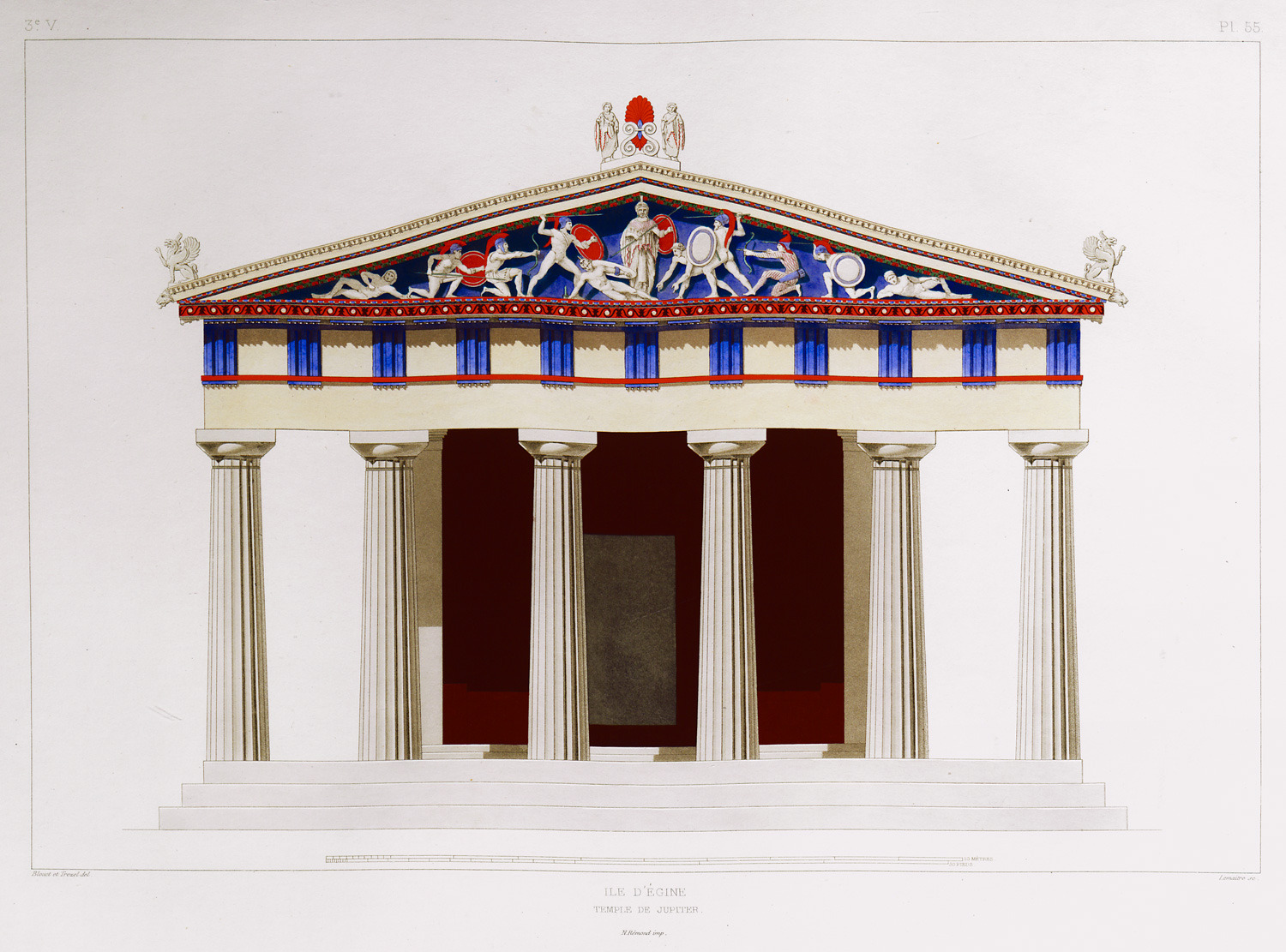
Reconstruction drawing of the facade of the Temple of Aphaia, Aegina, Greece, including its pediment, unknown temple architect or illustrator, c.500 BC

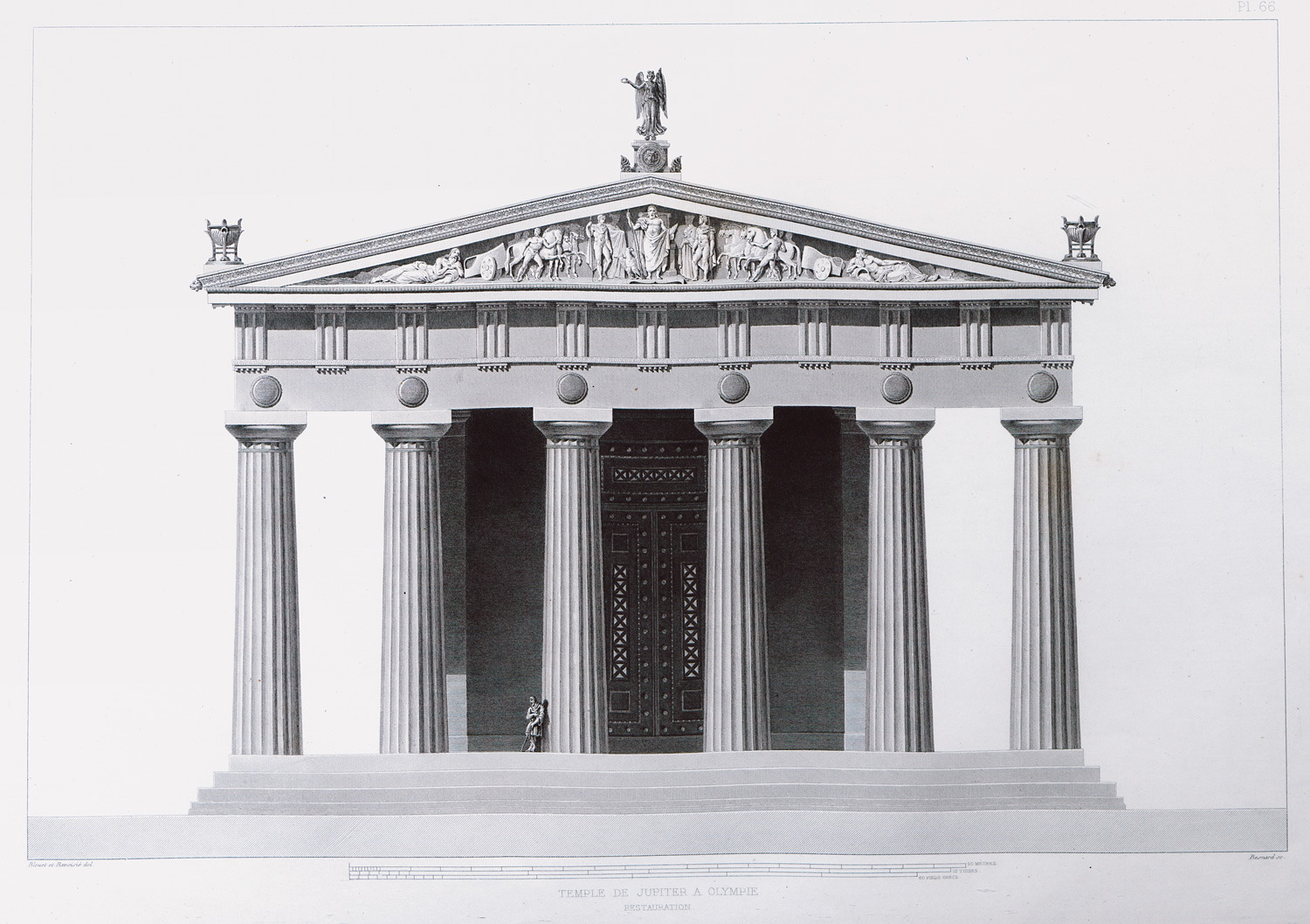
Reconstruction drawing of the facade of the Temple of Zeus, Olympia, Greece, including its pediment, unknown architect or illustrator, c.472-456 BC

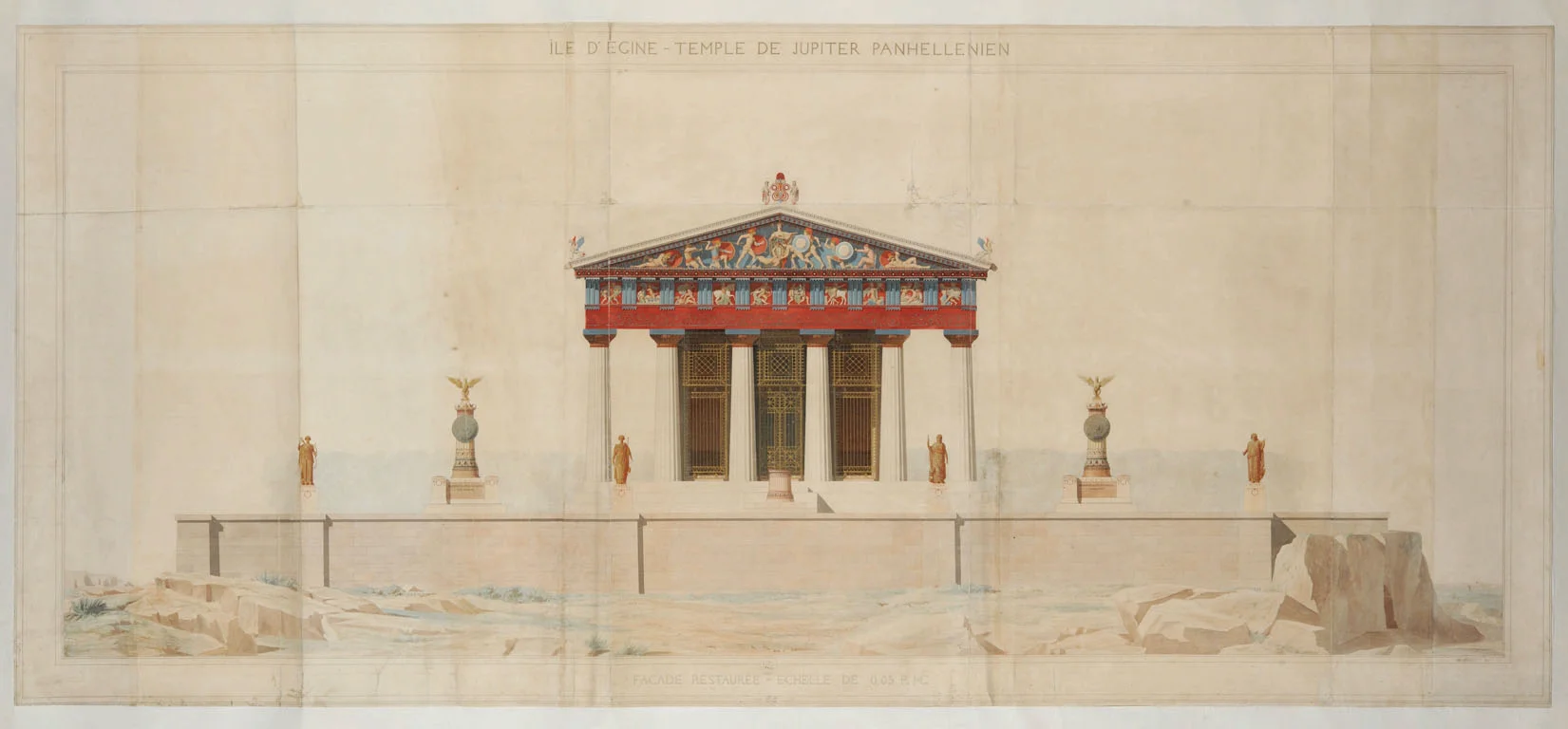
Reconstruction drawing of the facade of the Temple of Hellanius Zeus, Aegina, including its pediment, showing the polychromy all ancient sculptures and buildings had, unknown architect, illustrated by Charles Garnier in 1852, unknown date

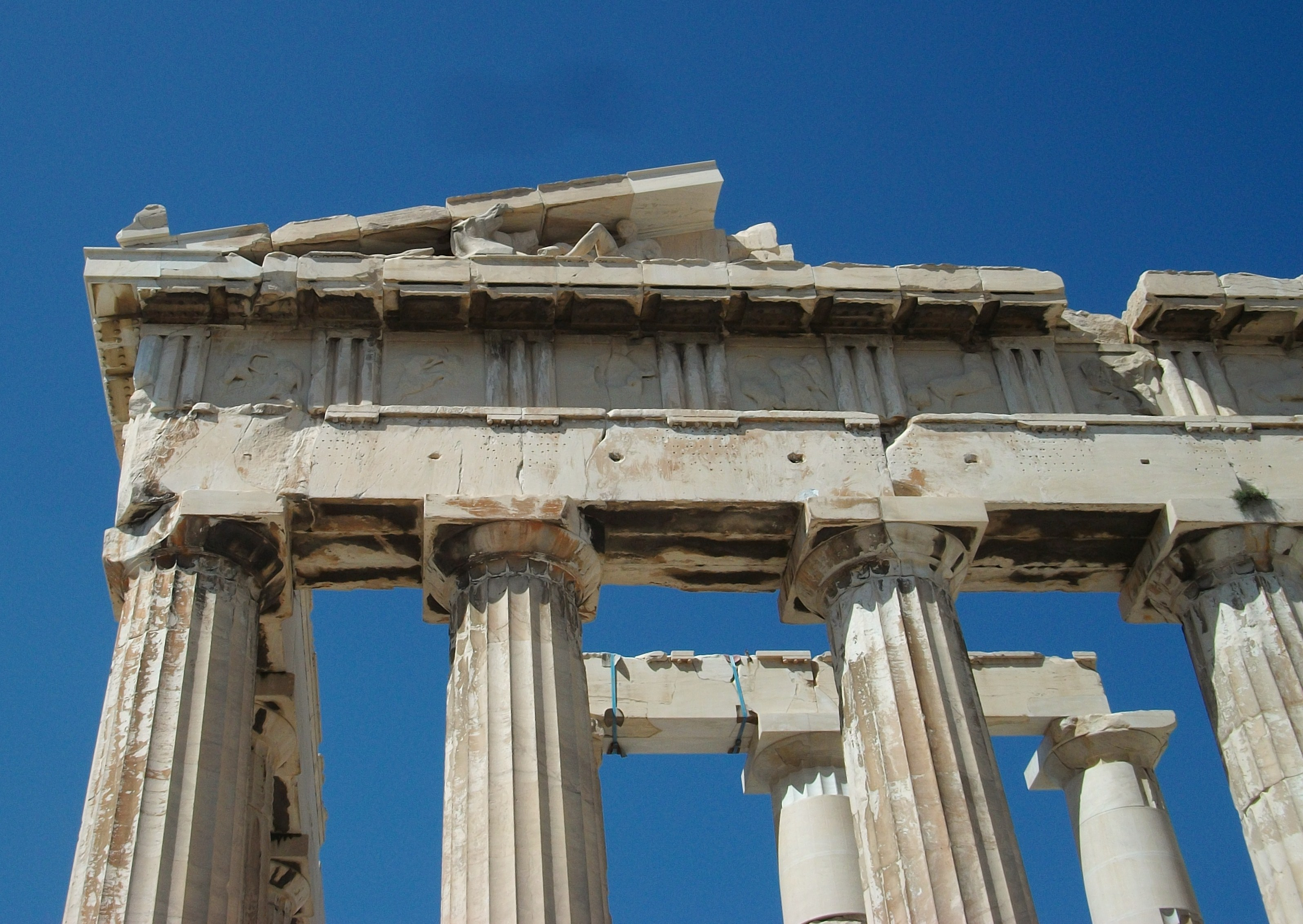
One of the few sections of the sculpture of the Ancient Greek pediment of the Parthenon still in place; others are the Elgin Marbles in the British Museum, London

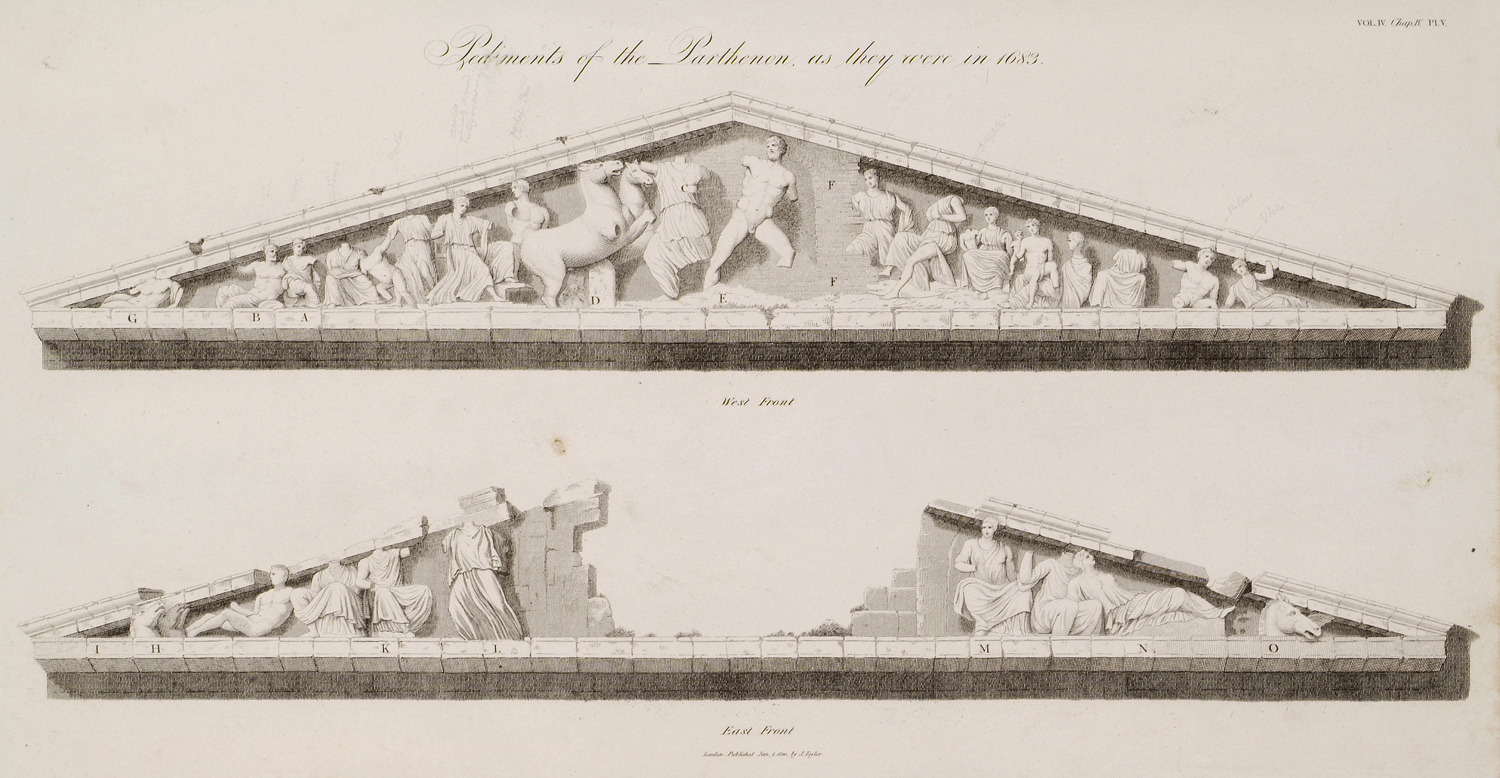
Illustrations with the sculptures of the two pediments of the Parthenon, by James Stuart and Nicholas Revett in 1794

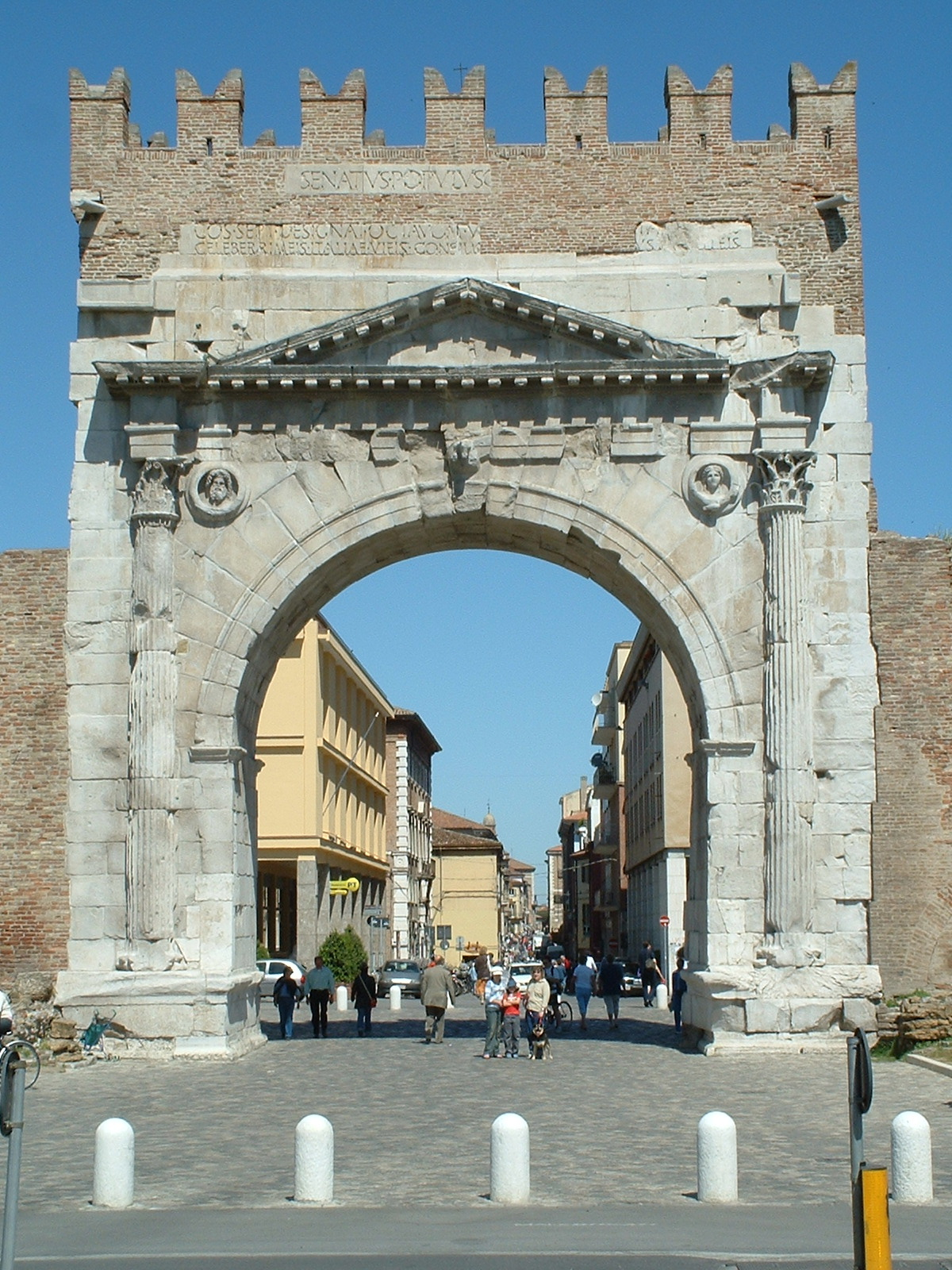
Roman pediment of the Arch of Augustus, Rimini, 27 BC

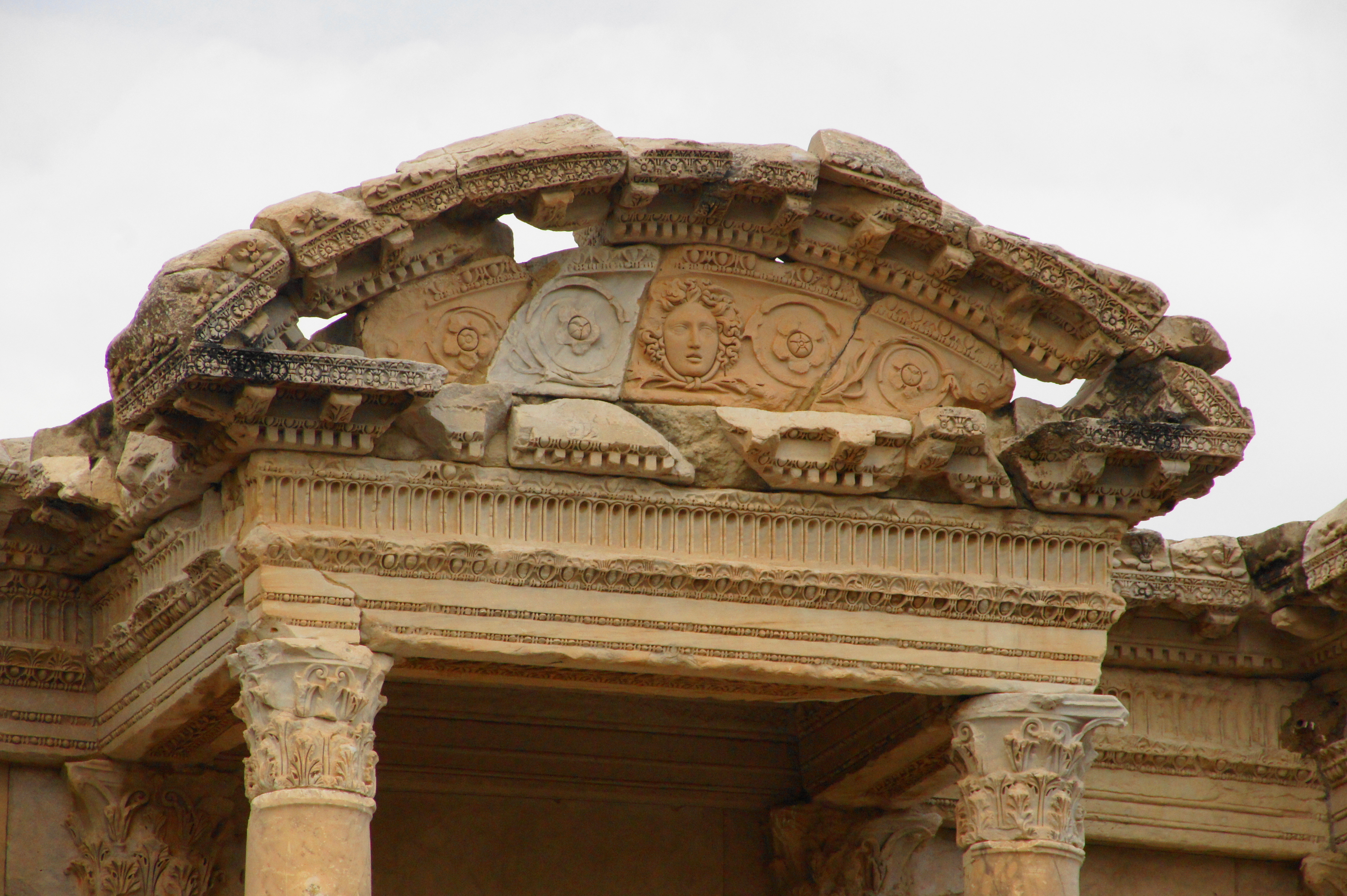
Roman mascaron with rinceaux in a segmental pediment of the Library of Celsus, Ephesus, Turkey, unknown architect, c.110 AD

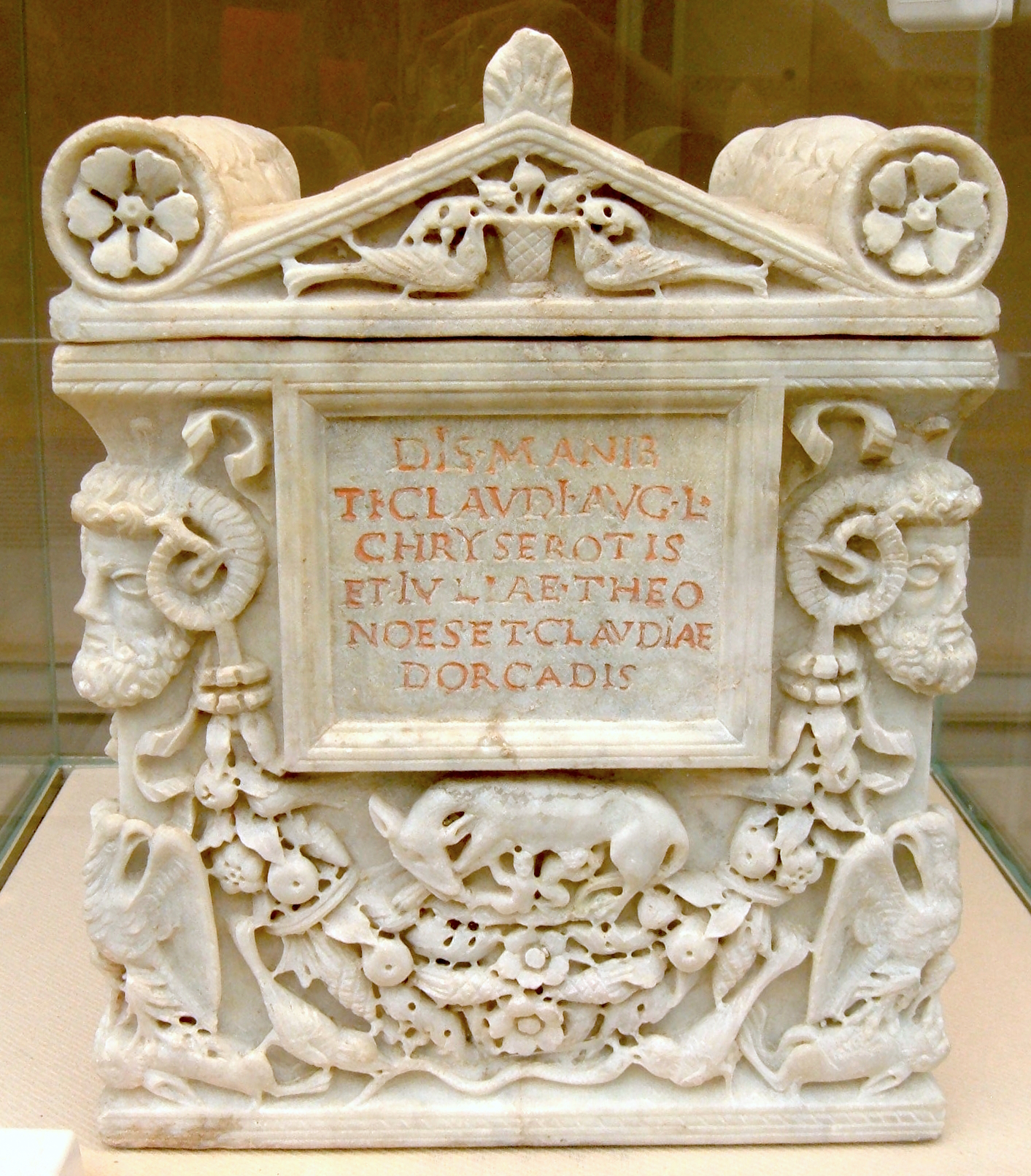
Roman pediment on a funerary urn, unknown date, marble, Terme di Diocleziano, Rome

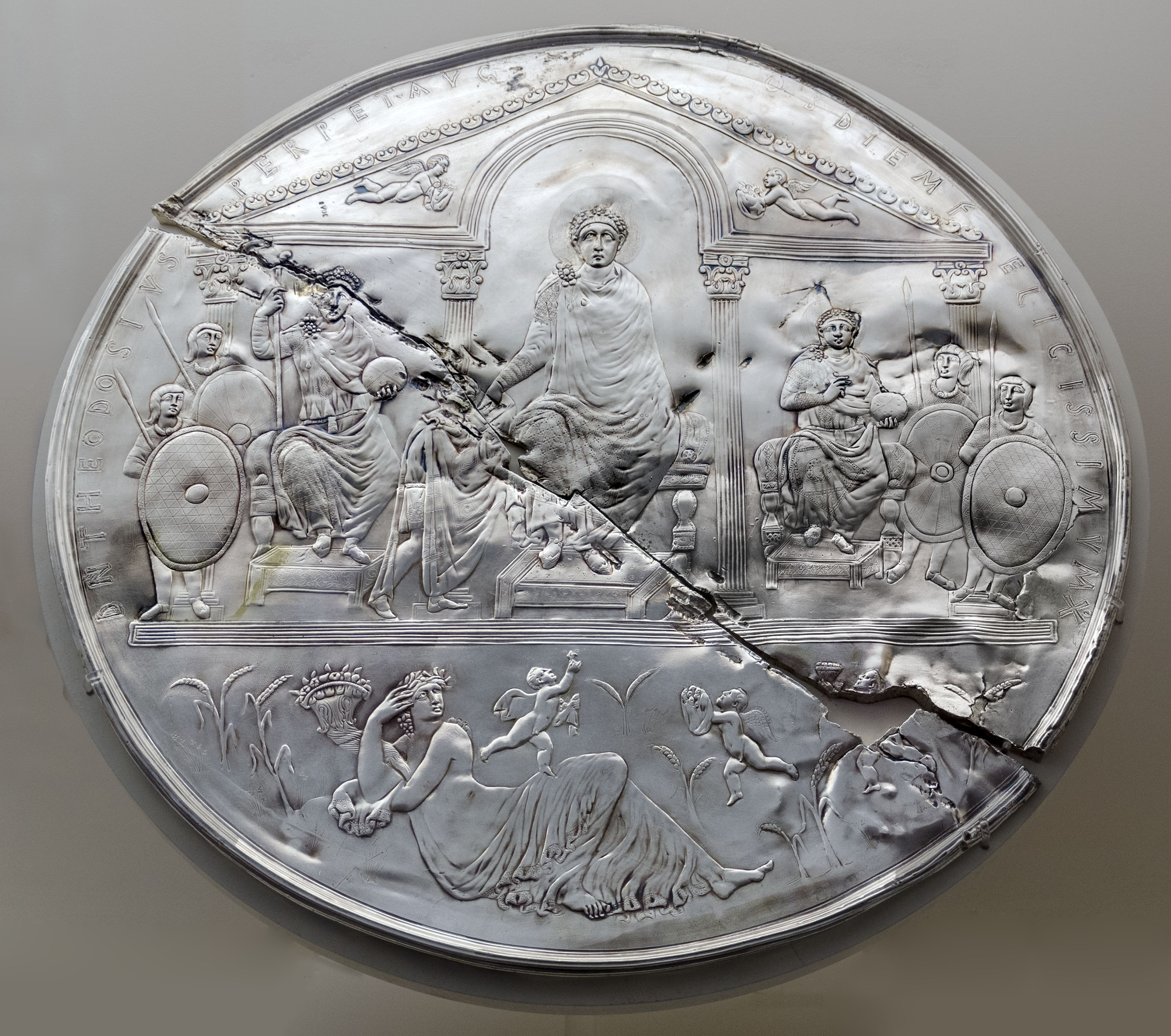
Late Roman-early Byzantine pediment on the Missorium of Theodosius I, 388, silver, Real Academia de la Historia, Madrid, Spain

=== Medieval ===
In Carolingian and Romanesque architecture pediments tended towards the equilateral triangle, and the enclosing cornice has little emphasis; they are often merely gable ends with some ornament. In Gothic architecture pediments with a much more acute angle at the top were used, especially over doorways and windows, but while the rising sides of the cornice is elaborate, the horizontal bottom element was typically not very distinct. Often there is a pointed arch underneath, and no bottom element at all. "Pediment" is typically not used for these; they are often called a "canopy". From the Renaissance onwards, some pediments no longer fitted the steeply pitched roofs and became freestanding, sometimes sloping in the opposite direction to the roof behind.

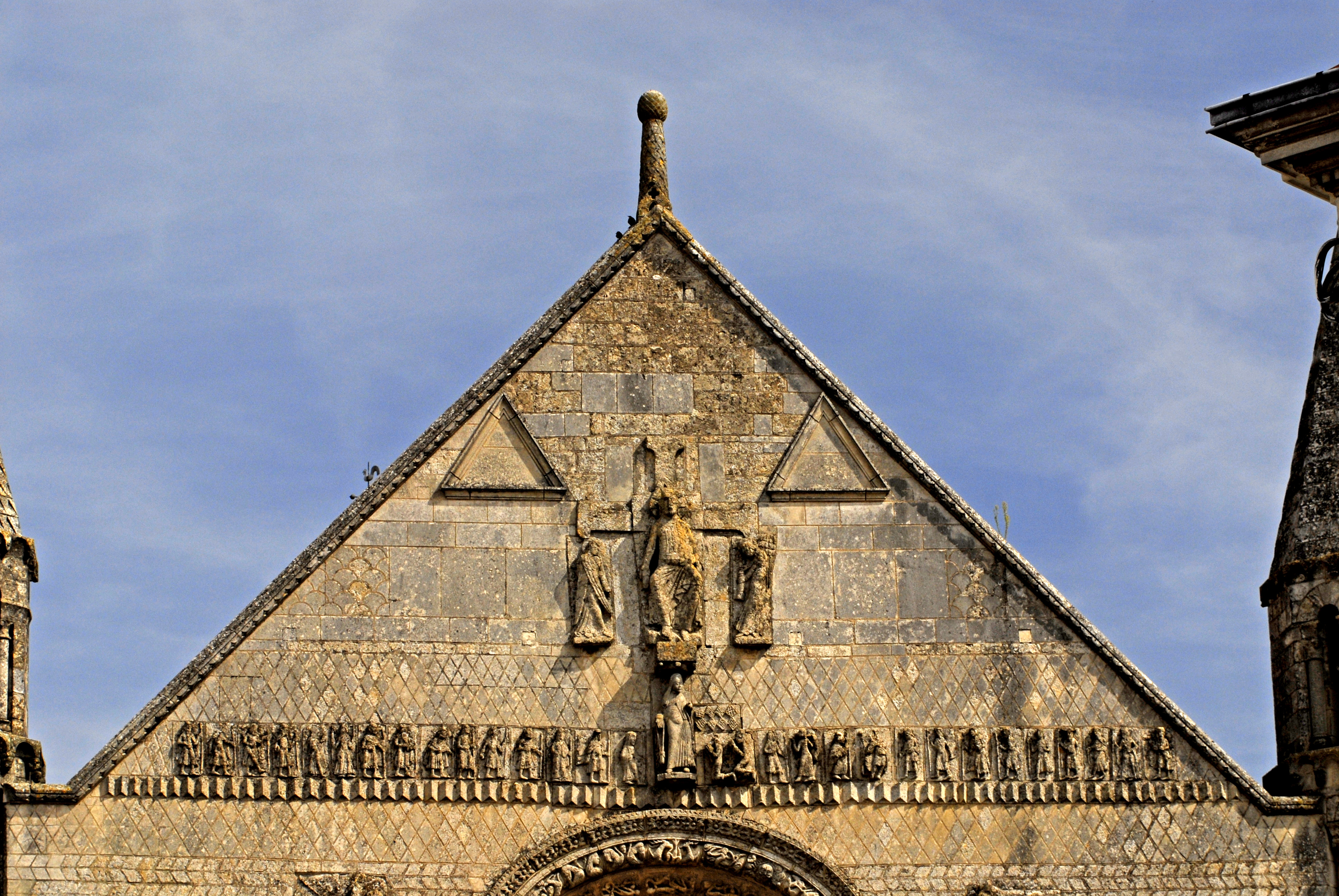
Romanesque pediment of the Abbaye Saint-Jouin de Marnes, Saint-Jouin-de-Marnes, Deux-Sèvres, France, started in 1095

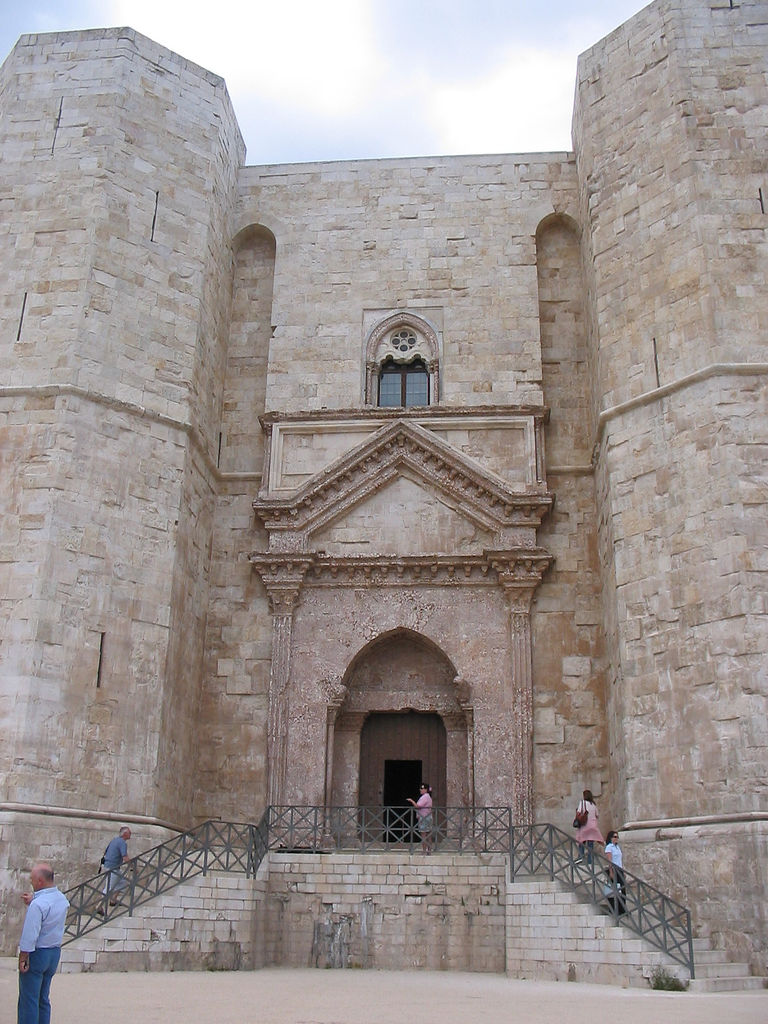
Entrance of the Castel del Monte, Apulia, Italy, 1240s

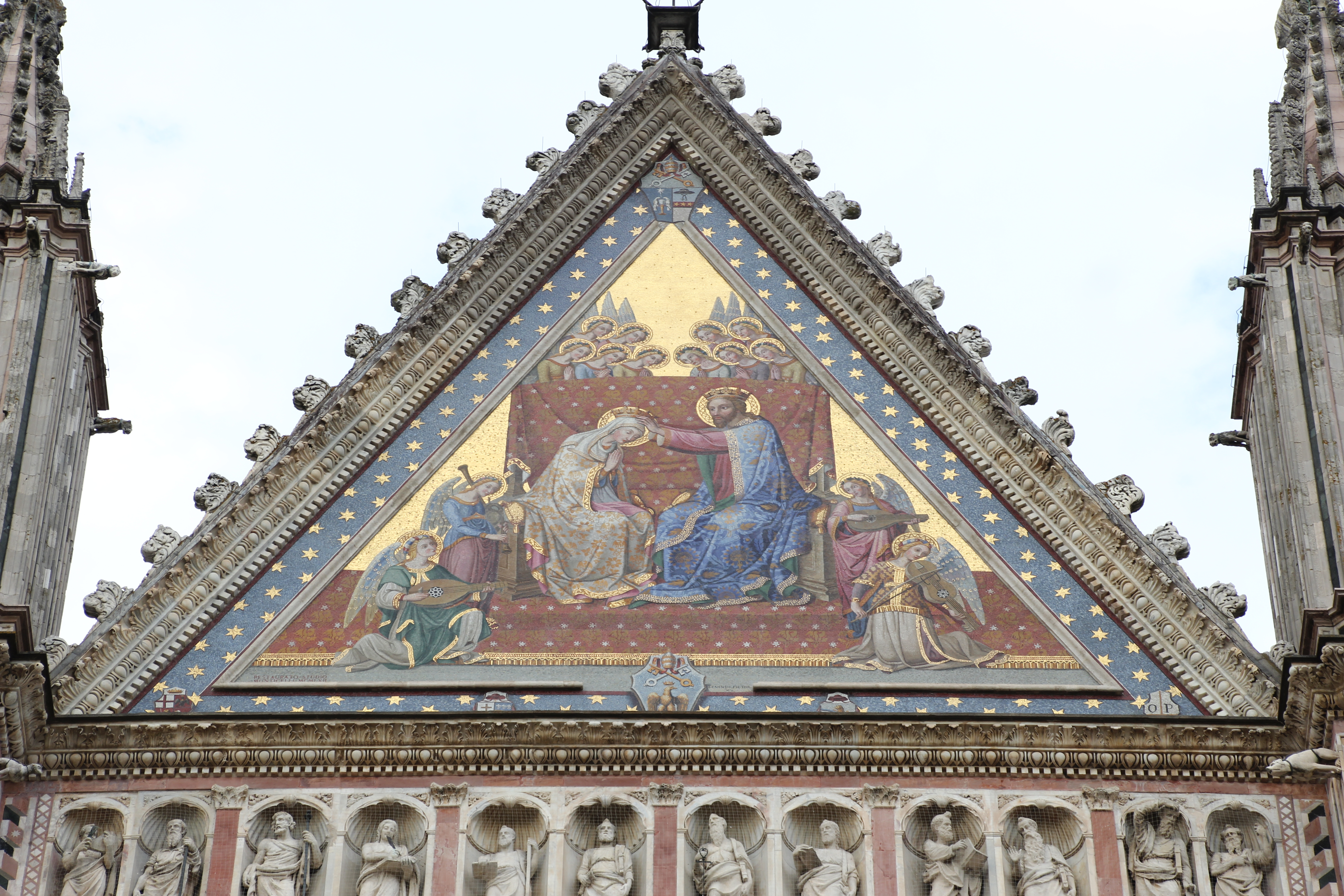
Gothic pediment of Orvieto Cathedral, Orvieto, Italy, 1290-1591

=== Renaissance, Baroque and Rococo ===
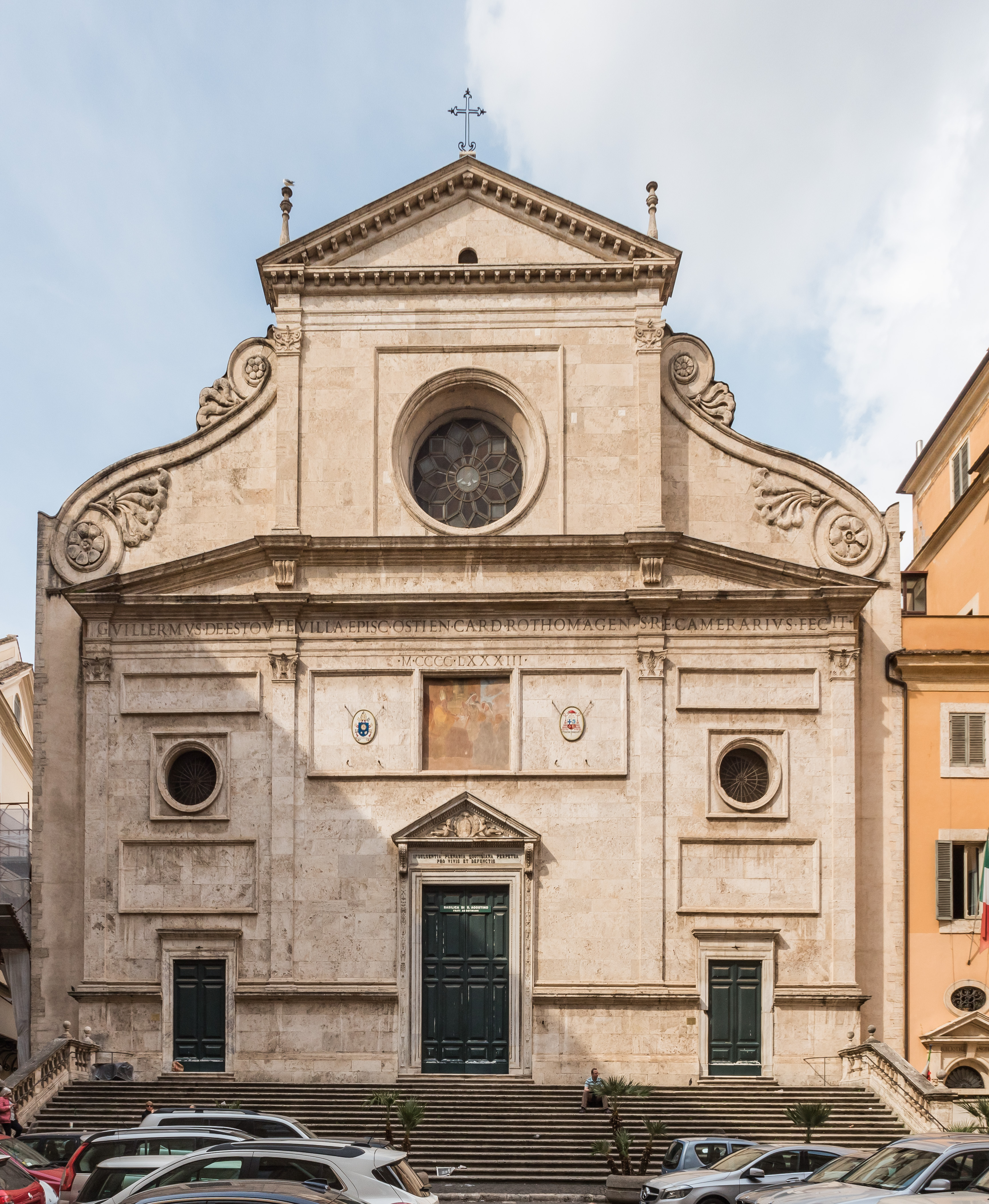
Sant'Agostino, Rome, by multiple architects, 1483, with three pediments, including a squashed one in the middle

When classical-style low triangular pediments returned in Italian Renaissance architecture, they were initially mostly used to top a relatively flat facade, with engaged elements rather than freestanding porticos supported by columns. Leon Battista Alberti used them in this way in his churches: the Tempio Malatestiano (1450s, incomplete), Santa Maria Novella (to 1470), San Sebastiano in Mantua (unfinished by the 1470s), Sant'Andrea, Mantua (begun 1472), and Pienza Cathedral c. 1460), where the design was probably his. Here the cornice comes out and then retreats back, forming the top of pilasters with no capitals, a very unclassical note, which was to become much used.

In most of these, Alberti followed classical precedent by having the pediment occupy the whole width of the facade, or at least that part that projects outwards. Santa Maria Novella and Sant'Agostino, Rome (1483, by Giacomo di Pietrasanta, perhaps designed by Alberti) were early examples of what was to become a very common scheme, where the pediment at the top of the facade was much less wide, forming a third zone above a middle zone that transitioned the width from that of the bottom. The giant curving volute or scroll used at the sides of the middle zone at Sant'Agostino was to be a very common feature over the next two centuries. As in Gothic architecture, this often reflected the shapes of the roofs behind, where the nave was higher than the side-aisles.

Sant'Agostino also has a low, squashed down pediment at the top of the full-width section. This theme was developed by Andrea Palladio in the next century. The main facade of his San Giorgio Maggiore in Venice (begun 1566) has "two interpenetrating temple fronts", a wider one being overlaid with a narrower and higher one, respectively following the roof lines of the aisles and nave. Several of Palladio's villas also introduced the pediment to country house architecture, which was to be become extremely common in English Palladian architecture. In cities, Palladio reserved the temple front for churches, but in the Baroque, and especially outside Italy, this distinction was abandoned.

The first use of pediments over windows in the Renaissance was on the Palazzo Bartolini Salimbeni in Florence, completed in 1523 by Baccio d'Agnolo. Vasari says the innovation caused ridicule initially, but later came to be admired and widely adopted. Baccio was accused of turning a palazzo into a church. Three windows on each of three storeys (and the door) alternate regular and segmental pediments; there is no pediment at the top of the facade, just a large cornice, as was usual.

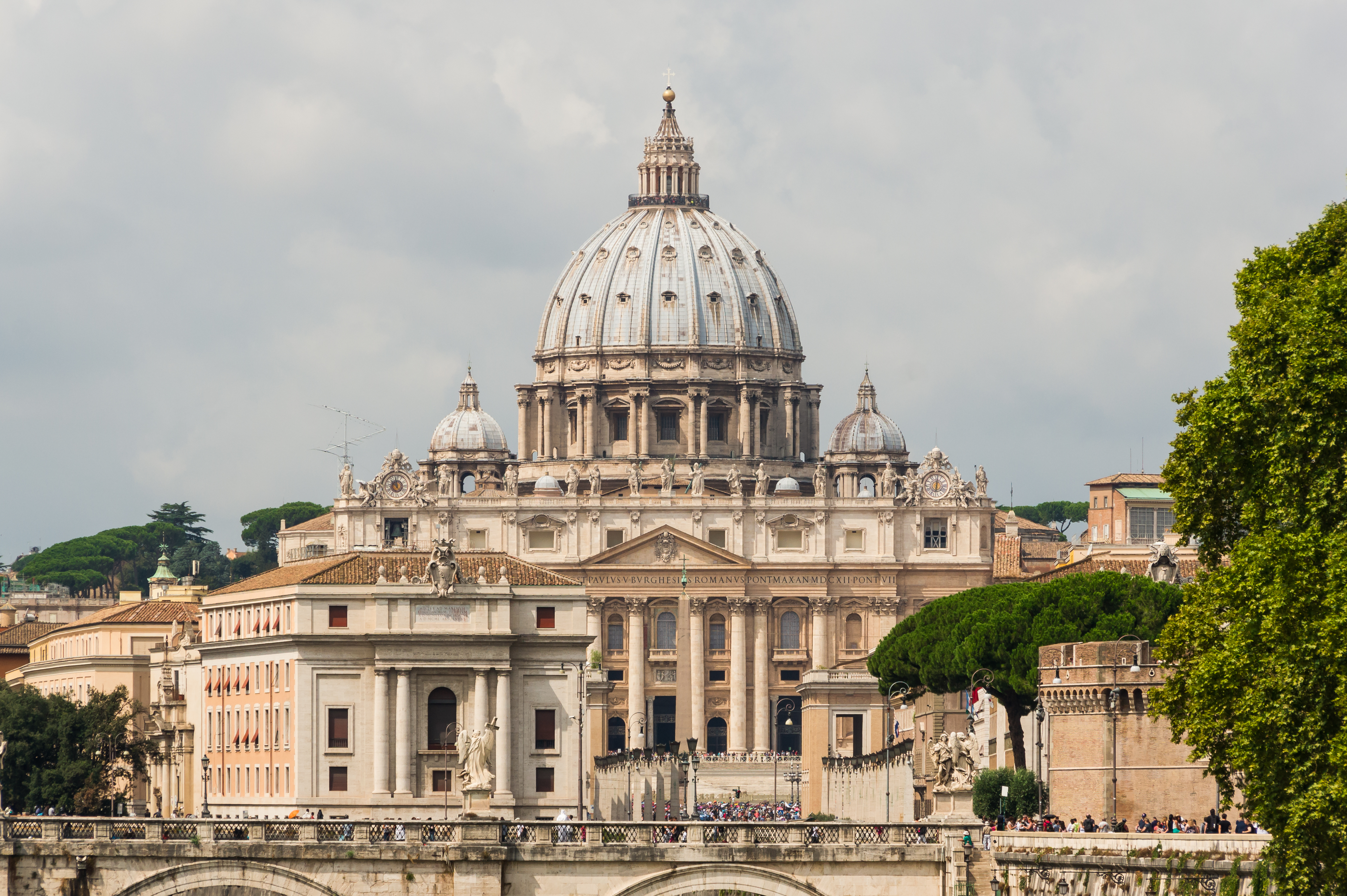
St Peter's Basilica, Rome, by multiple architects, 1506-1626

In St Peter's Basilica there is a conventional pediment over the main entrance, but the complicated facade stretches beyond it to both sides and above, and though large in absolute terms it makes a relatively small impression. Many later buildings used a temple front with pediment as a highlight of a much wider building. The St Peter's facade also has many small pedimented windows and aedicular niches, using a mixture of segmental, broken, and open pediments.

Variations using multiple pediments became very popular in Baroque architecture, and the central vertical line of church facades often ascended through several pediments of different sizes and shapes, in Rome five at the Church of the Gesù (Giacomo della Porta 1584) and six at Santi Vincenzo e Anastasio a Trevi (Martino Longhi the Younger, 1646), the top three folding into each other, using the same base line. This facade has been described as "a veritable symphony in repetitious pedimentry, bringing together a superimposed array of broken pediments, open pediments and arched pediments". The Gesù is the home church of the Jesuit order, who favoured this style, which was first seen in many cities around Europe in a new main Jesuit church.

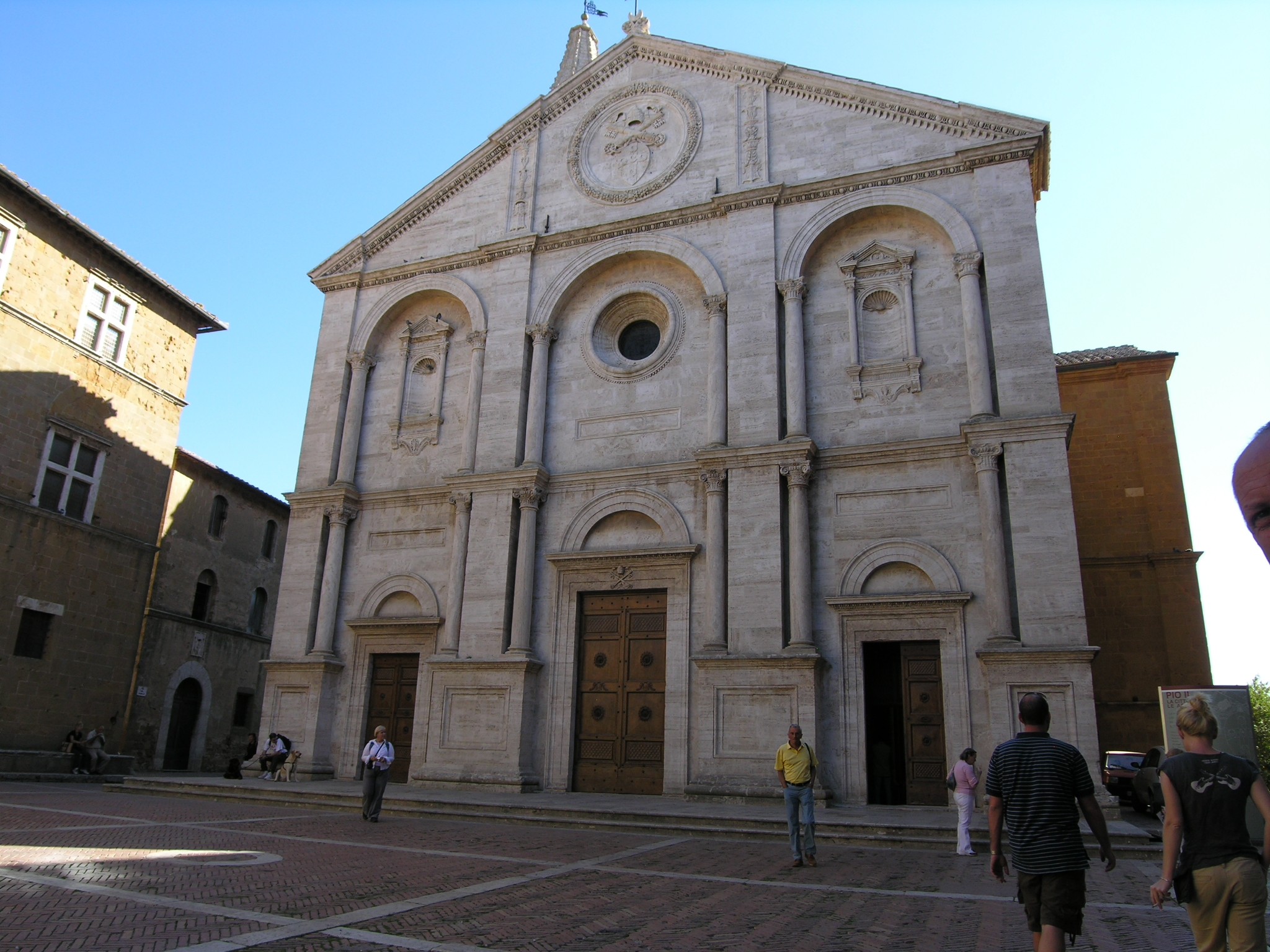
Pienza Cathedral, Italy, with the coat of arms of Pope Pius II, 1459-1462

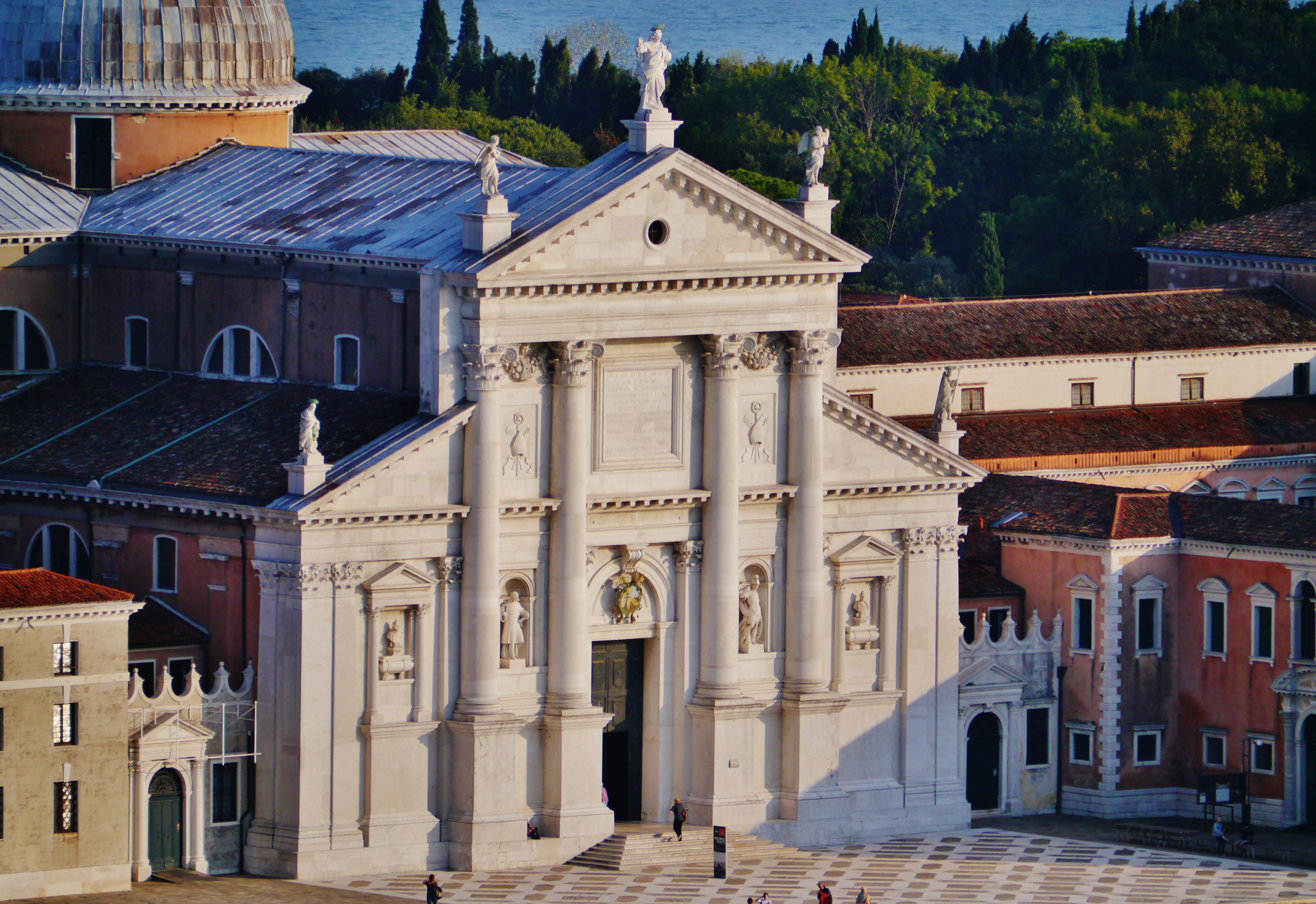
San Giorgio Maggiore, Venice, by Andrea Palladio, begun 1566

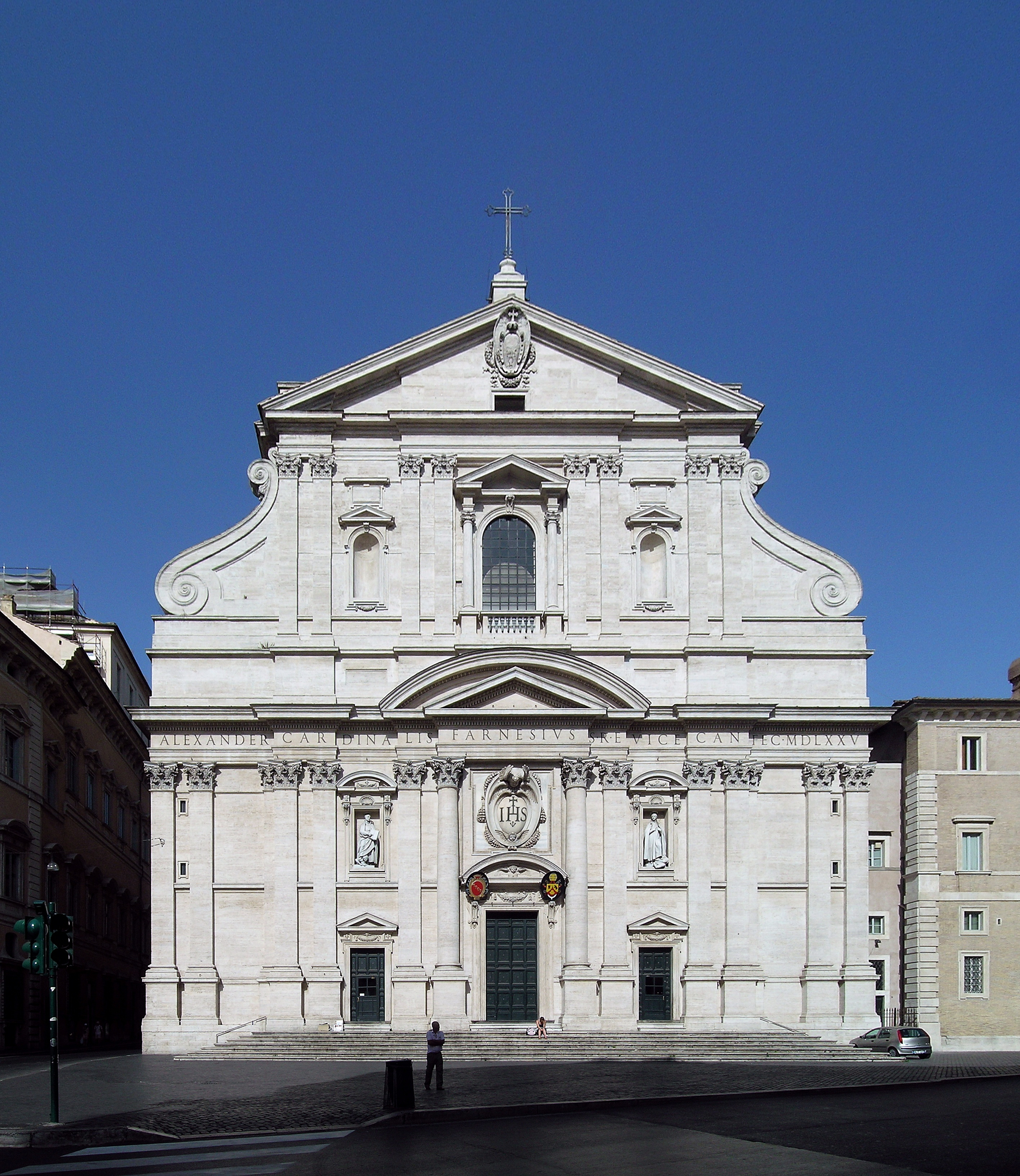
Church of the Gesù, Rome, by Giacomo della Porta, 1584

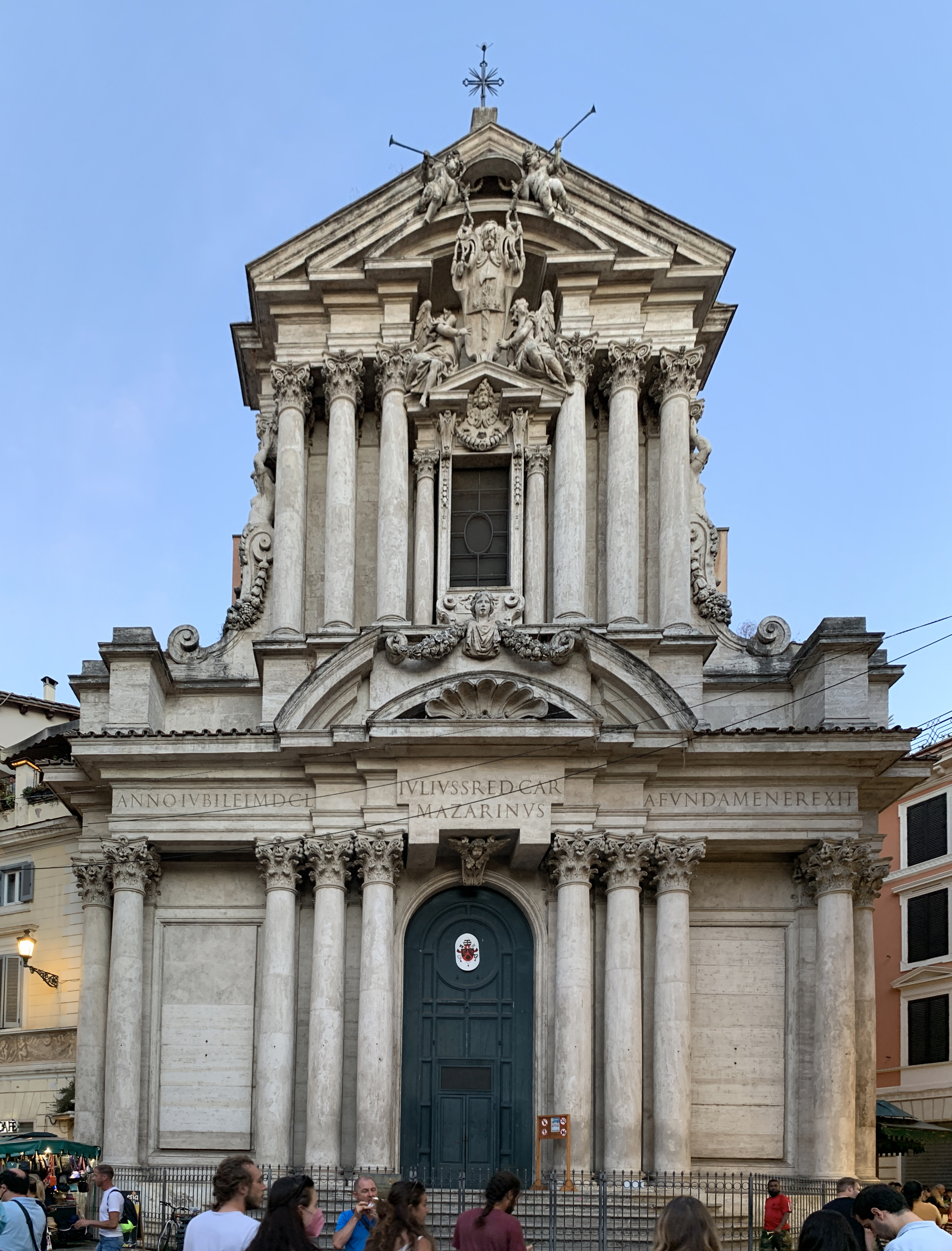
Santi Vincenzo e Anastasio a Trevi, Italy, by Martino Longhi the Younger, 1646

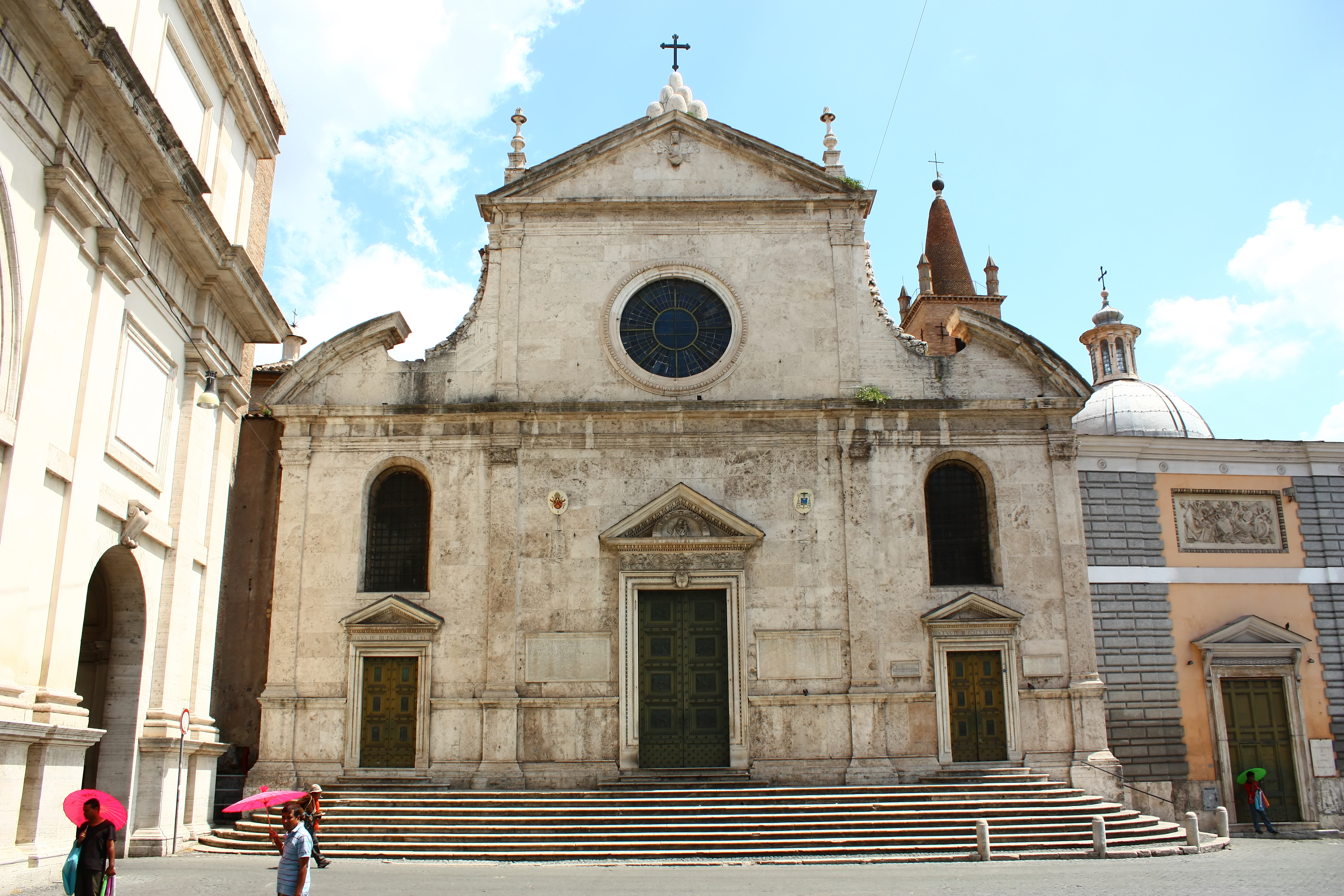
The facade of Santa Maria del Popolo, Rome, 1470s, with half-pediments at the mid-level by Bernini, replacing volutes

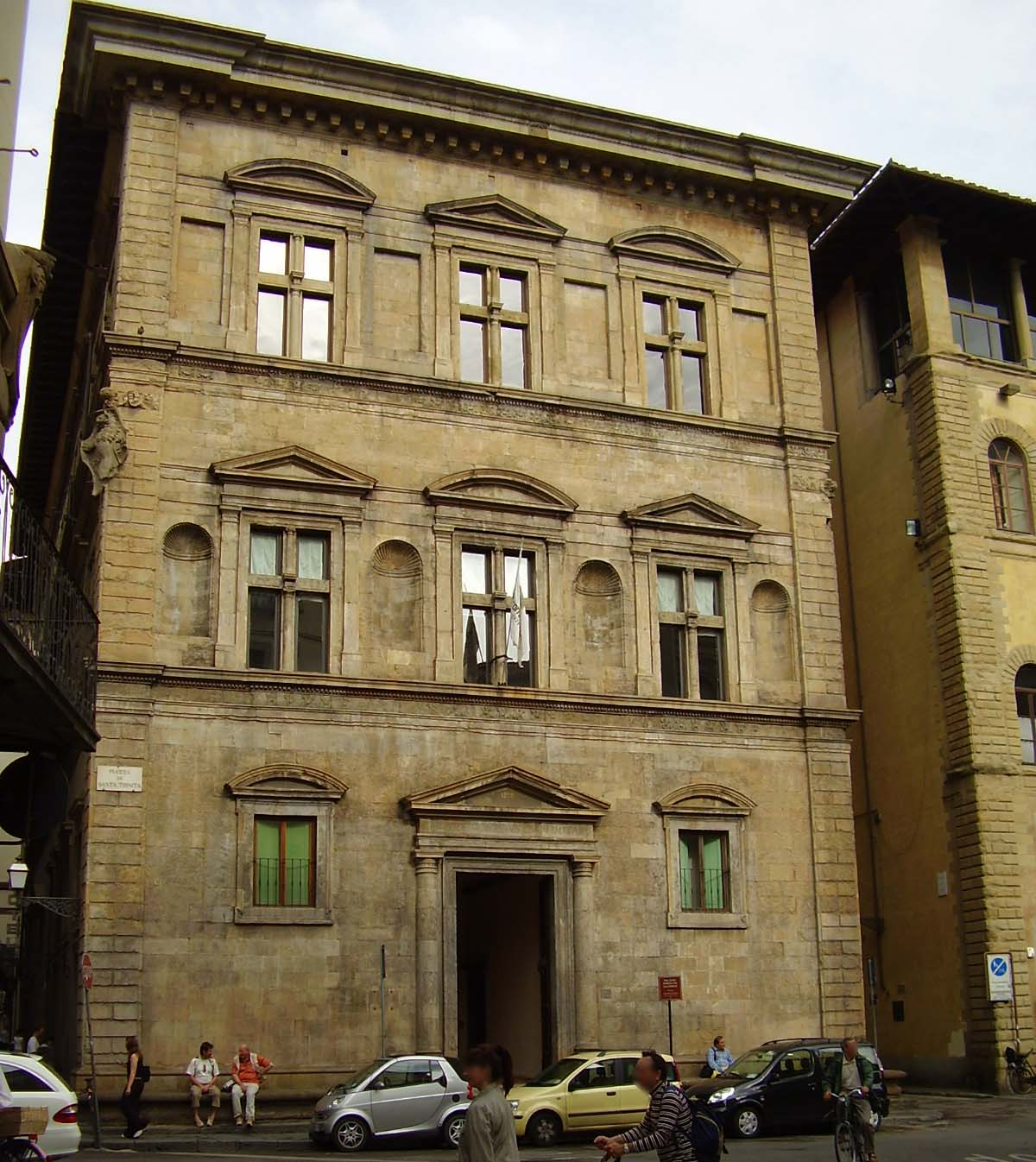
Palazzo Bartolini Salimbeni, 1523, the first pedimented windows of the Renaissance

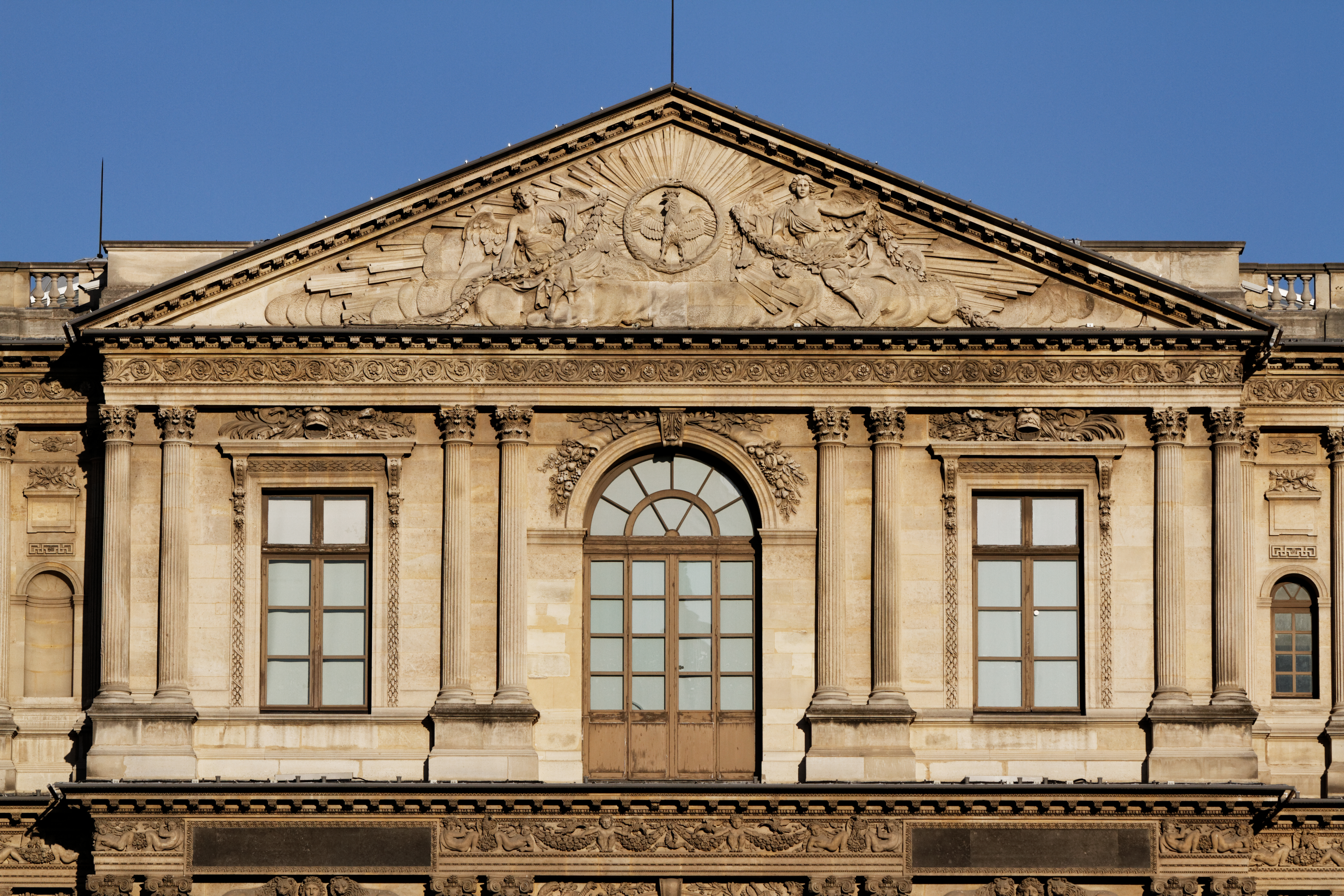
Baroque pediment of the Pavillon Saint-Germain-l'Auxerrois, part of the Palais du Louvre, Paris, unknown architect and sculptor, 17th century

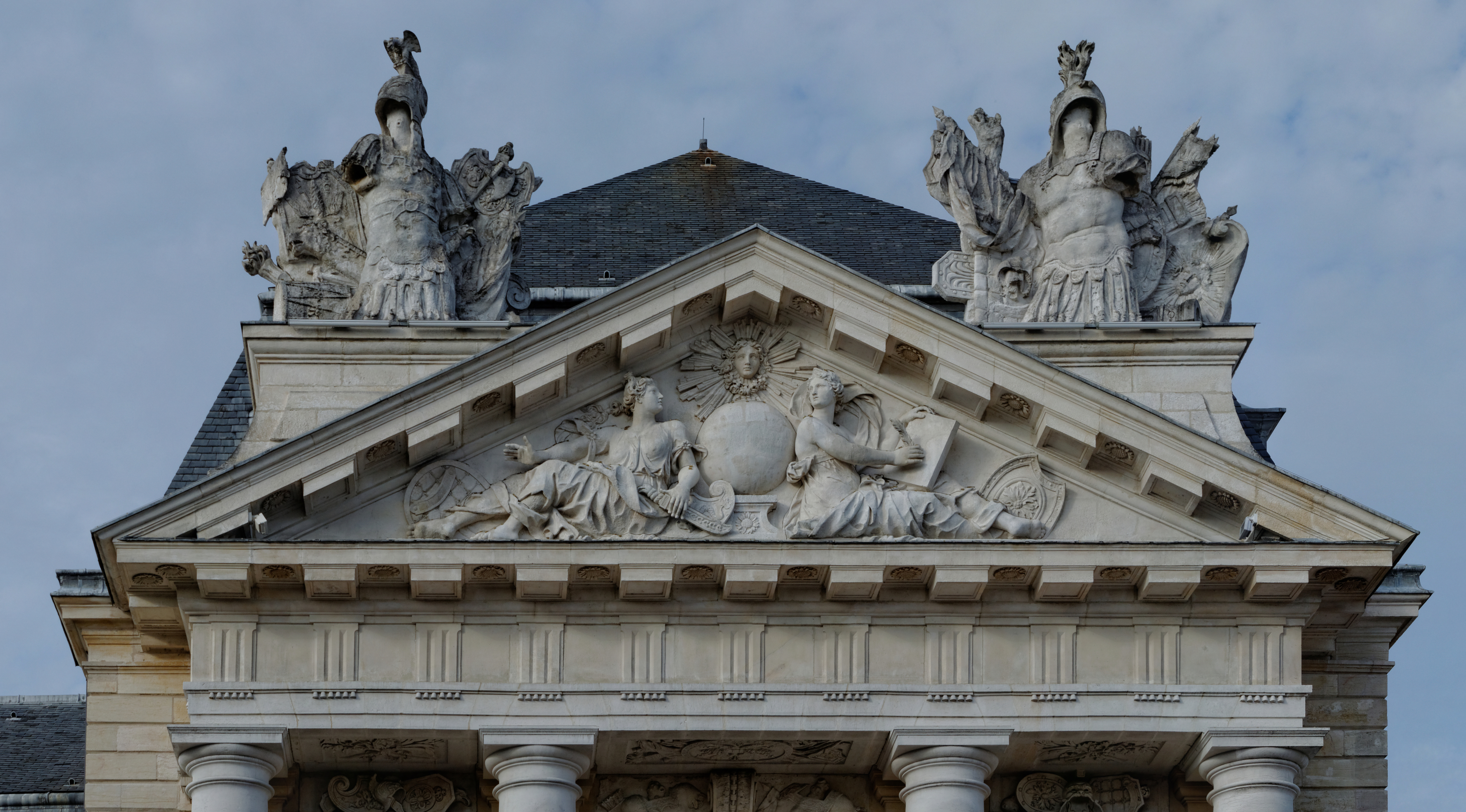
Baroque pediment of the Palace of the Dukes of Burgundy, Dijon, France, by Daniel Gittard after Jules Hardouin-Mansart, 1682-1689

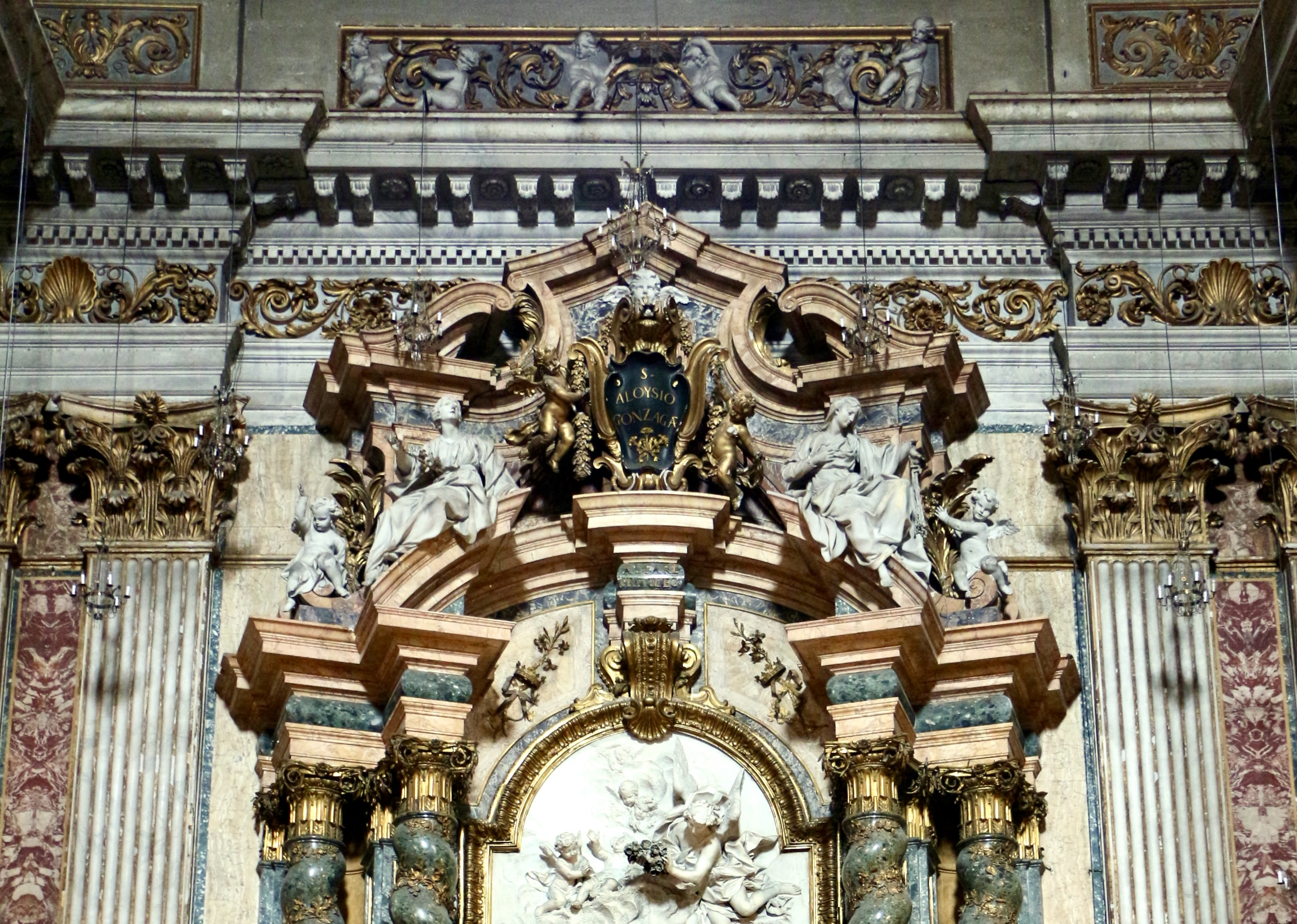
Baroque cartouche and pediments on the Altar of Saint Aloysius Gonzaga, Sant'Ignazio, Rome, by Pierre Le Gros the Younger, 1697-1699

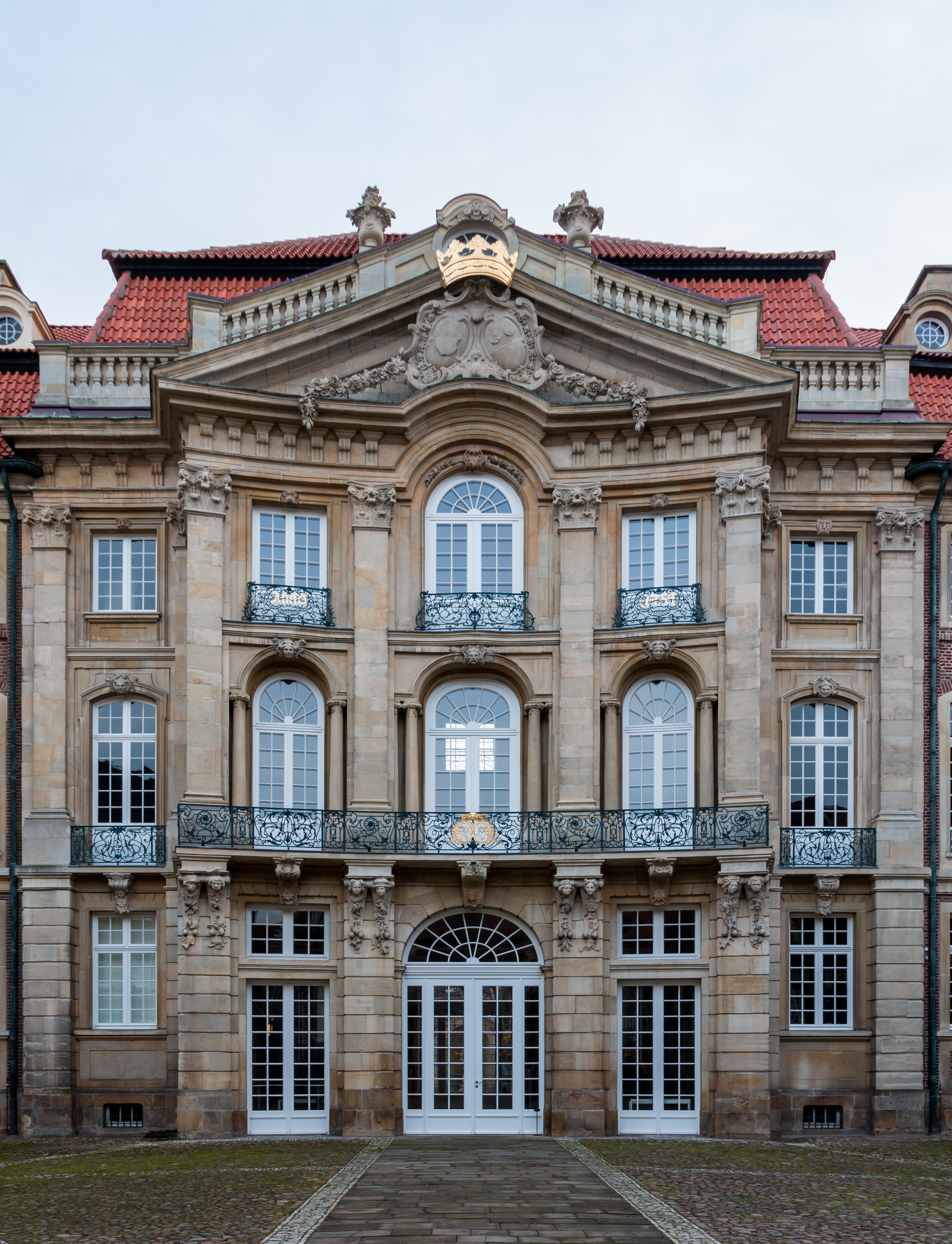
Curving Rococo pediment of the Erbdrostenhof, Münster, Germany, by Johann Conrad Schlaun, 1753-1757

=== From 1750 to Art Deco ===
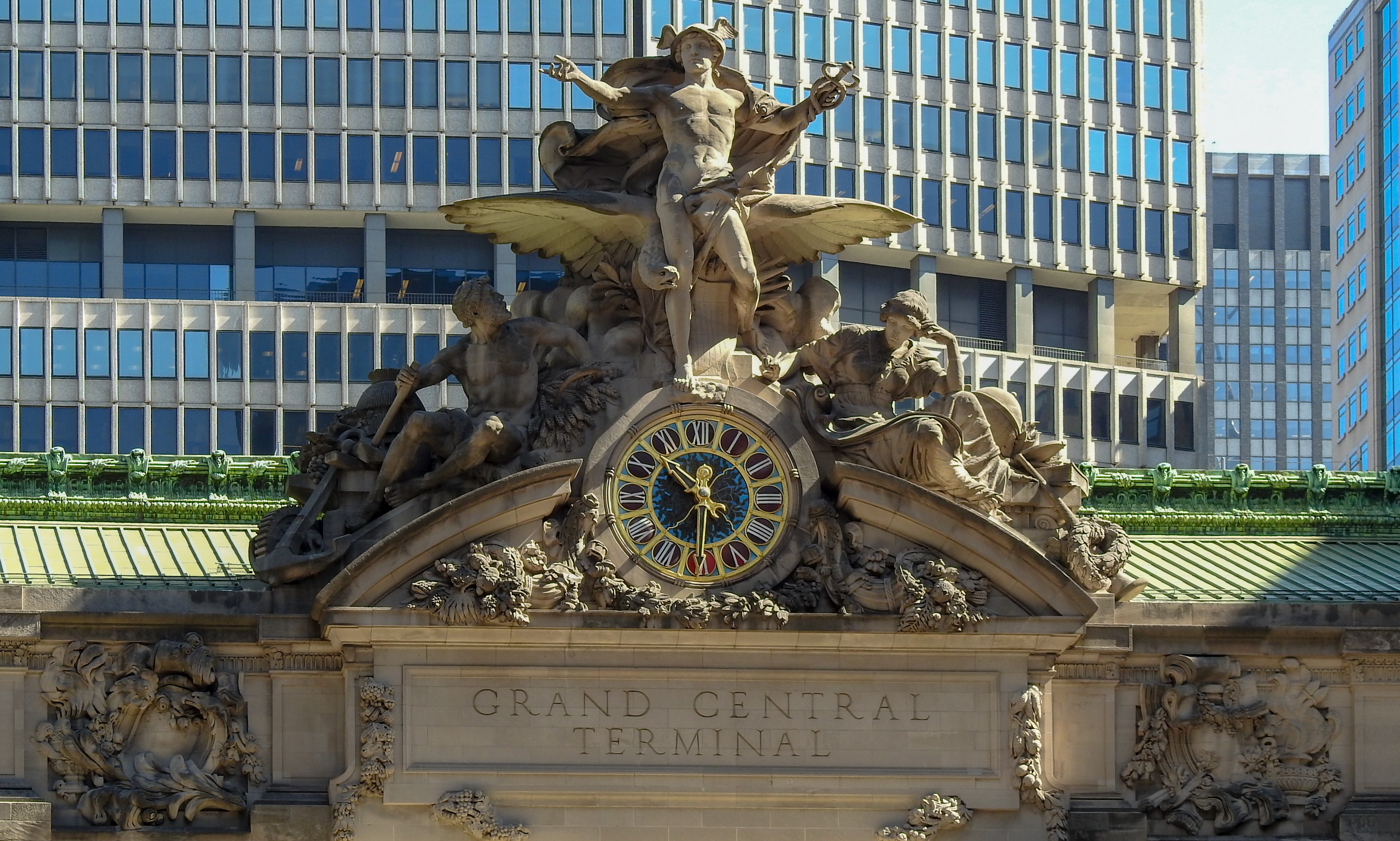
Beaux Arts broken segmental pediment, Grand Central Terminal, New York City, architects Reed and Stem and Warren and Wetmore, sculptor Jules Coutan, 1903

Pediments became extremely common on the main facades of English country houses, and many across northern Europe; these might be placed over a porch with columns, or simply decorations to an essentially flat facade. In England, if there was any sculpture within the tympanum, it was often restricted to a coat of arms.

Neoclassical architecture returned to "purer" classical models mostly using conventional triangular pediments, often over a portico with columns. Large schemes of pedimental sculpture were used where the budget allowed. In 19th-century styles, freer treatments returned, and large segmental pediments were especially popular in eclectic styles such as Beaux-Arts architecture, often overwhelmed by sculpture within, above, and to the sides.

Large pediments with columns, often called the "temple front", became widely used for important public buildings such as stock exchanges, reserve banks, law courts, legislatures, and museums, where an impression of solidity, reliability, and respectability was desired.

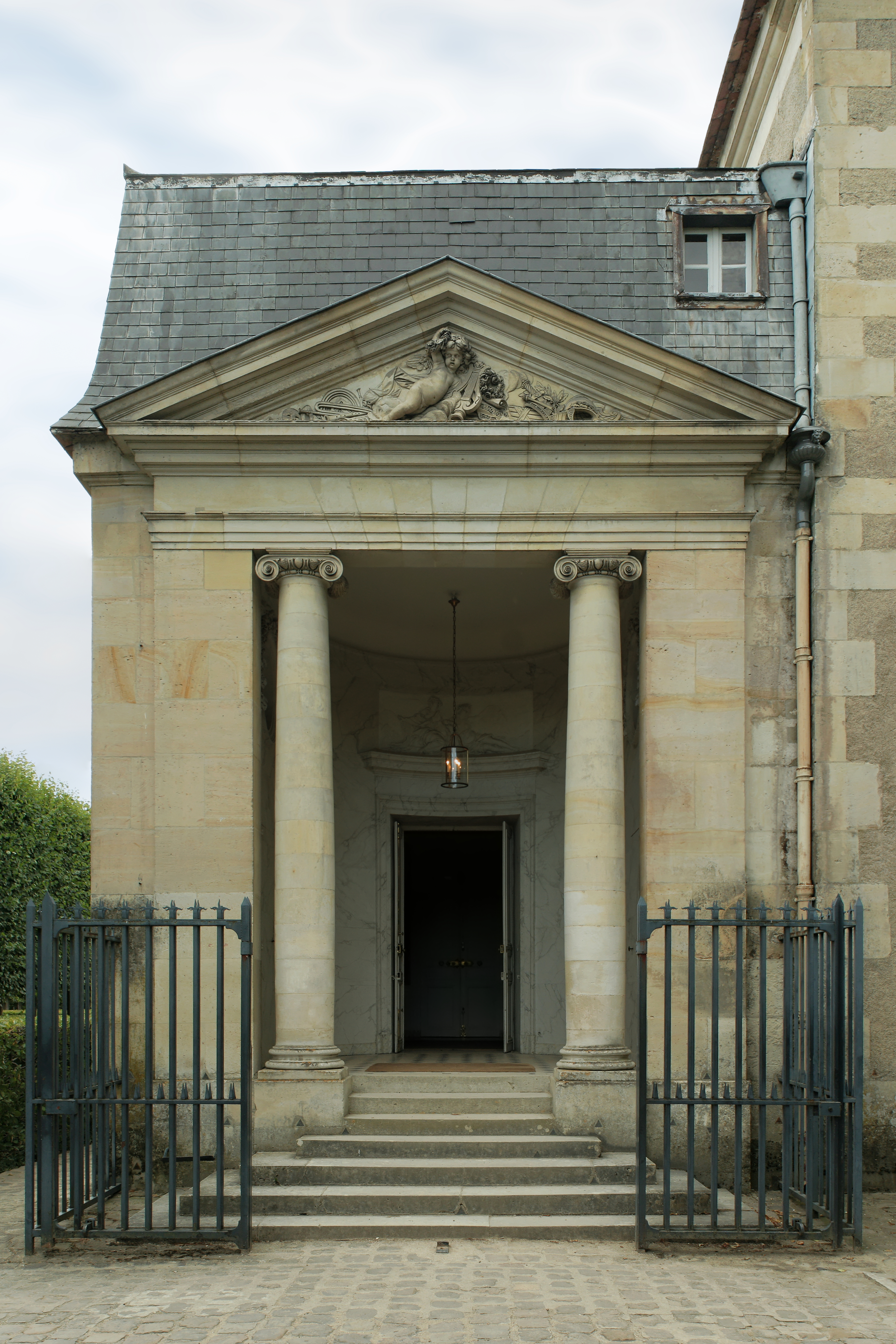
Louis XVI style pediment with a putto of the Théâtre de la reine, part of the Petit Trianon, France, by Richard Mique, c.1780

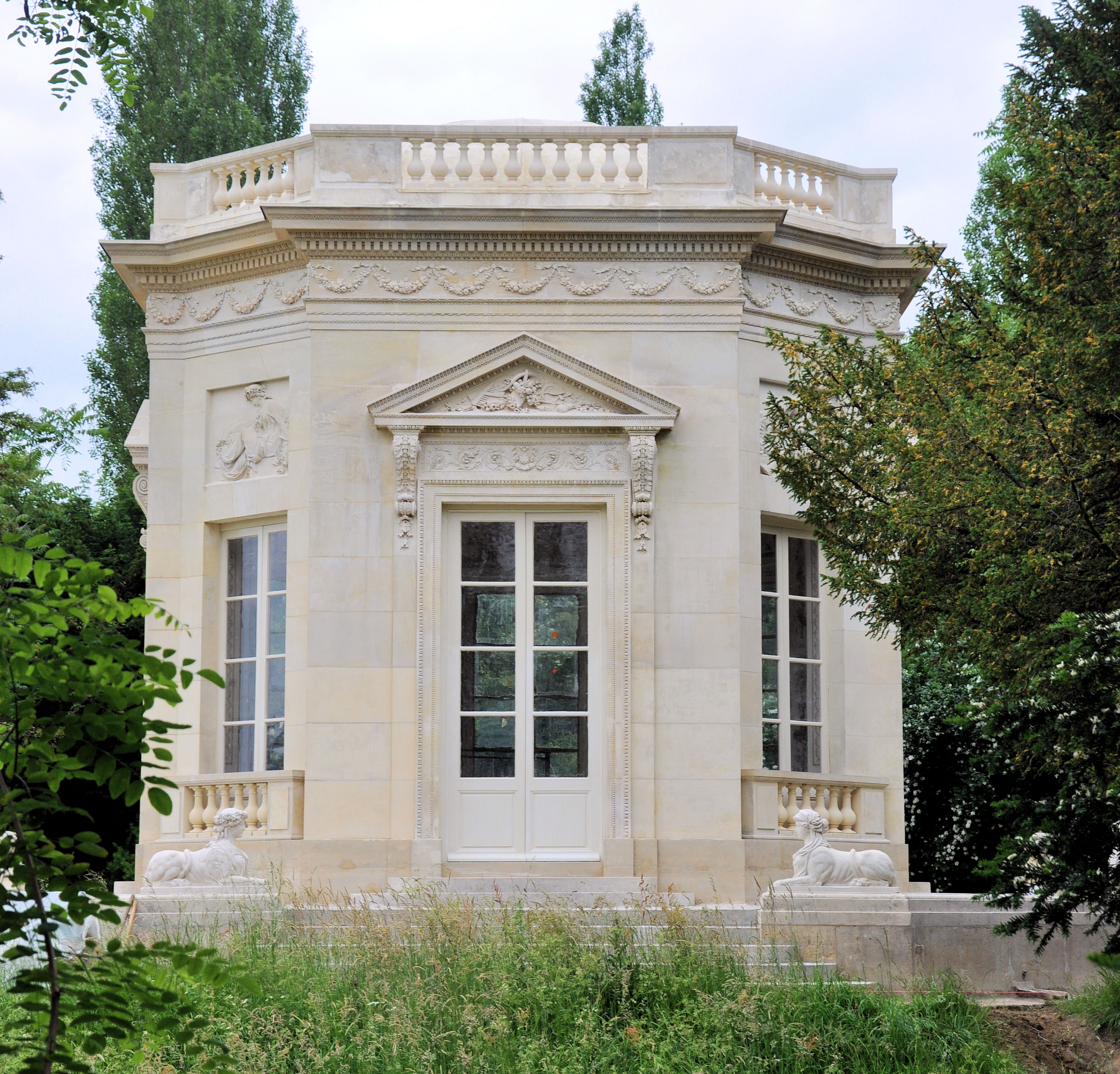
Louis XVI style pediment of the Belvédère, part of the Petit Trianon, by Richard Mique, completed in 1781

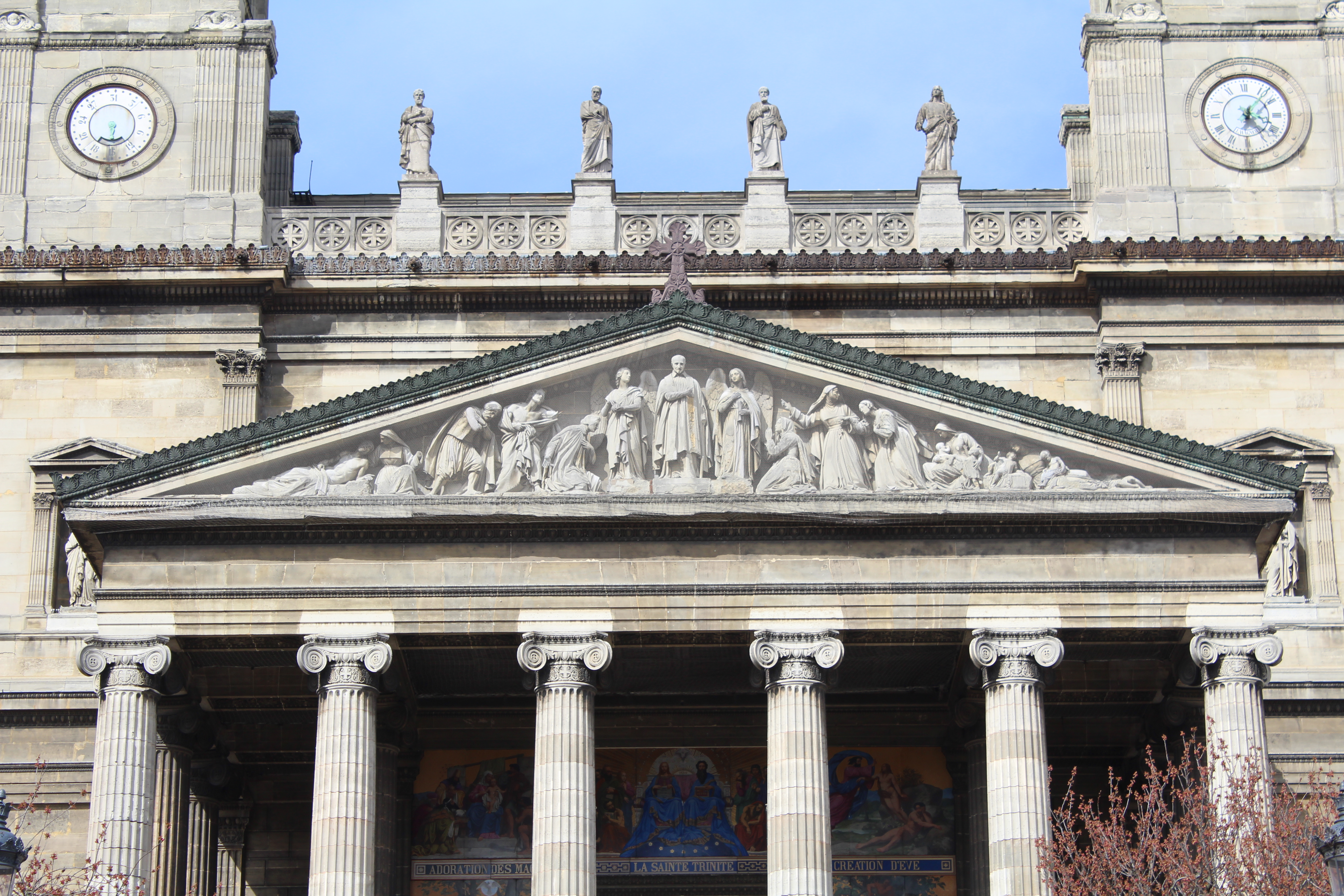
Neoclassical pediment of the Church of Saint-Vincent-de-Paul, Paris, by Jacques Ignace Hittorff, 1830–1846

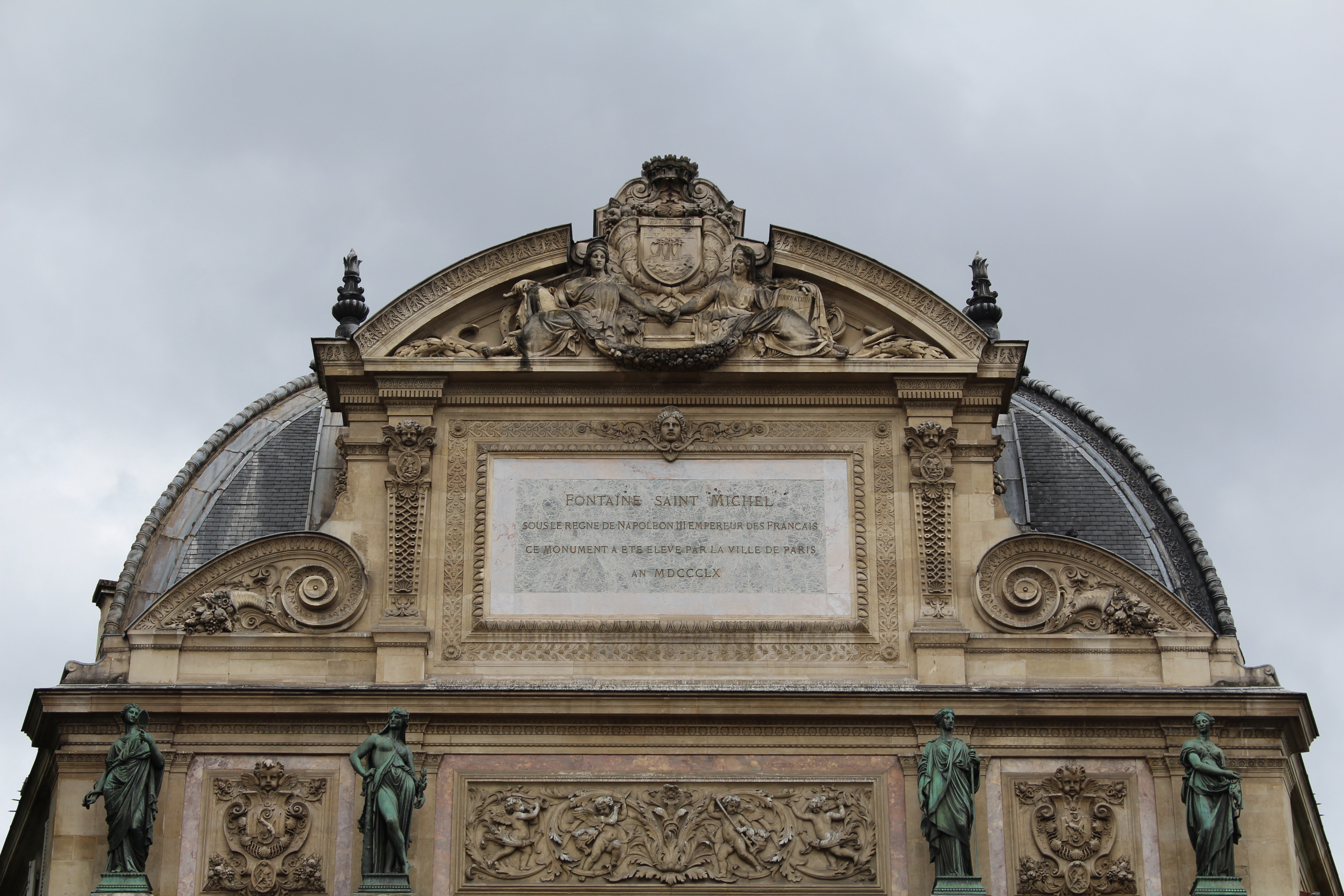
Baroque Revival pediment of the Fontaine Saint-Michel, Paris, by Gabriel Davioud, 1858

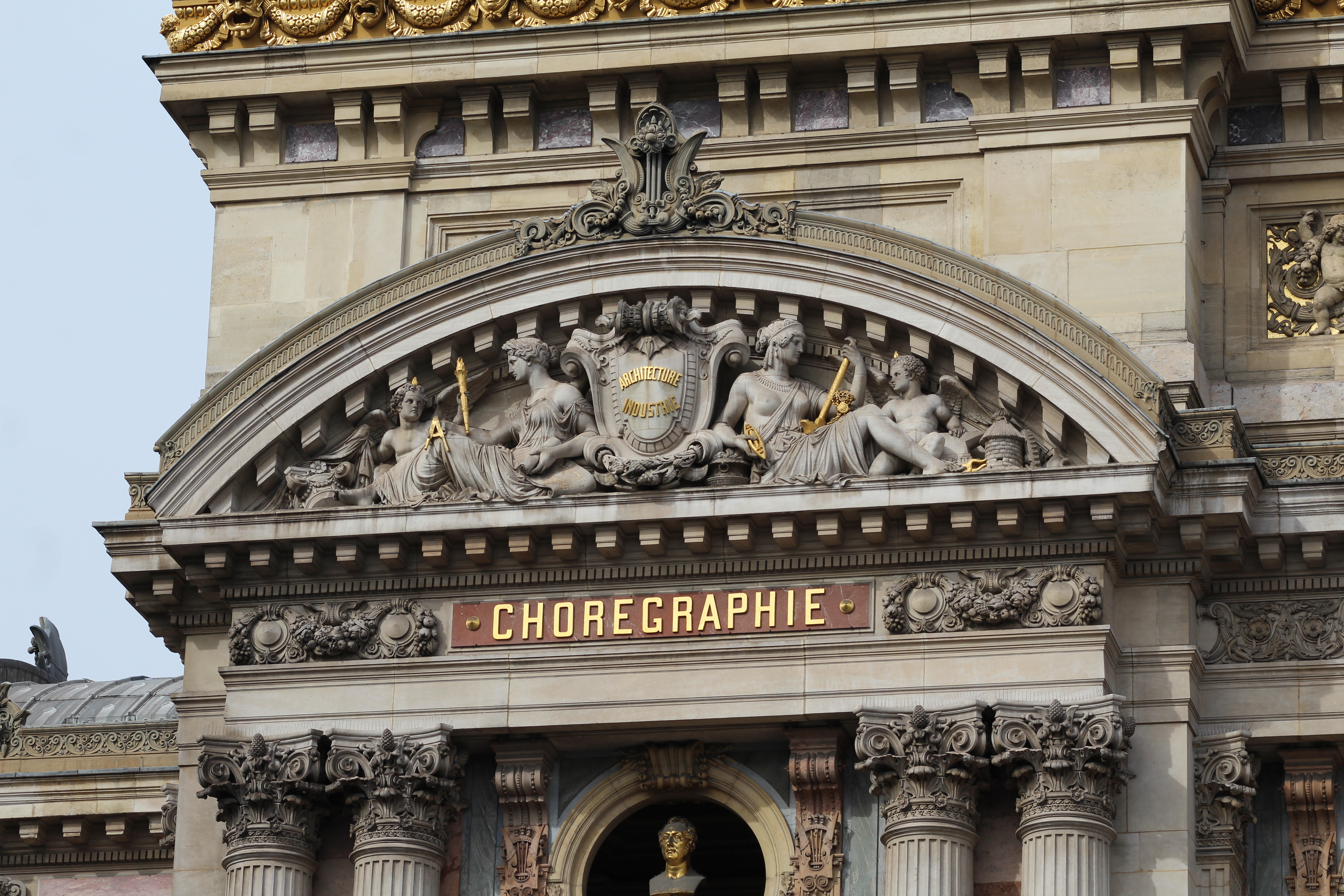
Beaux-Arts pediment with sculptures on the facade of the Palais Garnier, Paris, by Charles Garnier, 1861–1874

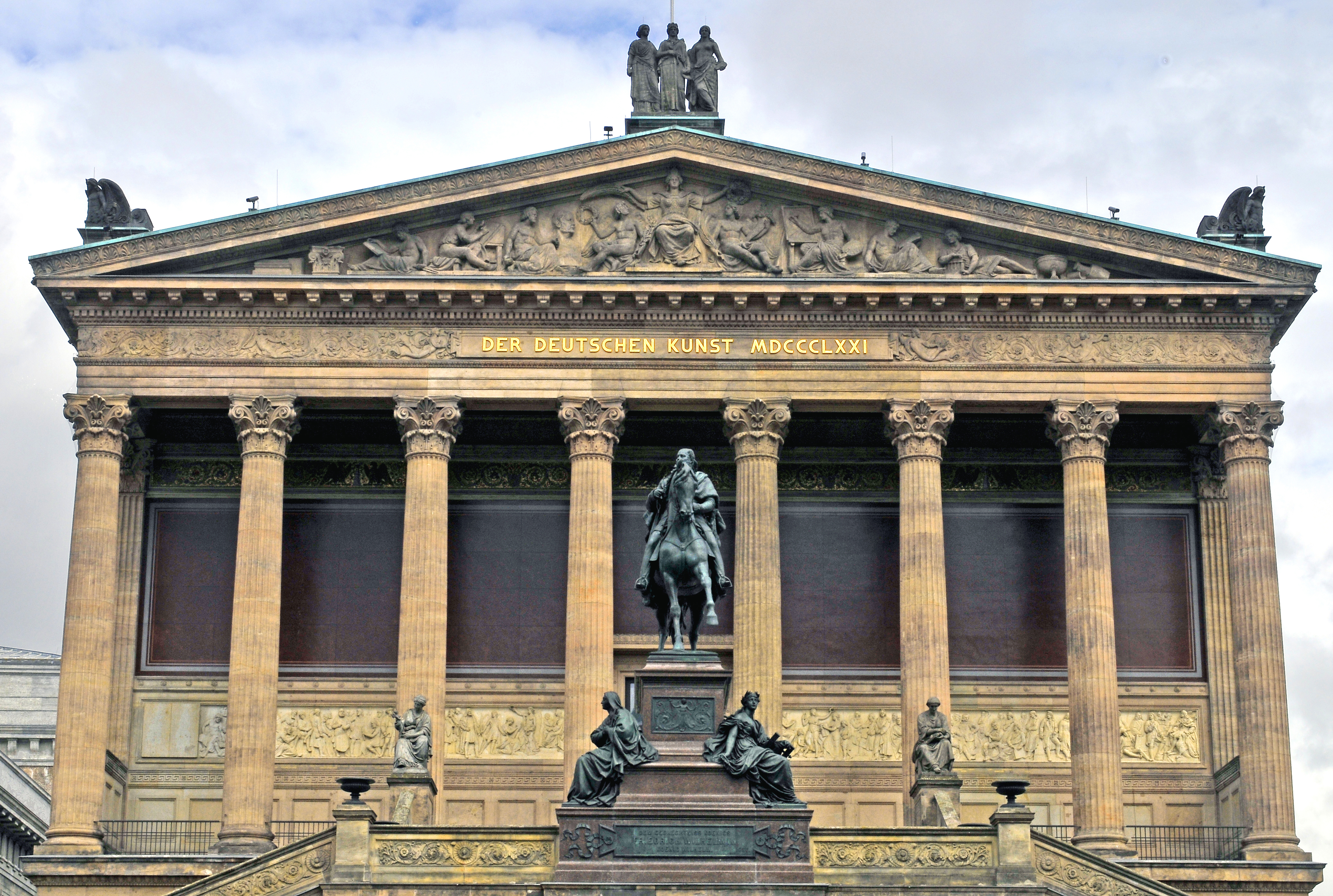
Neoclassical pediment of the Alte Nationalgalerie, Berlin, Germany, by Friedrich August Stüler and Heinrich Strack, 1865–1869

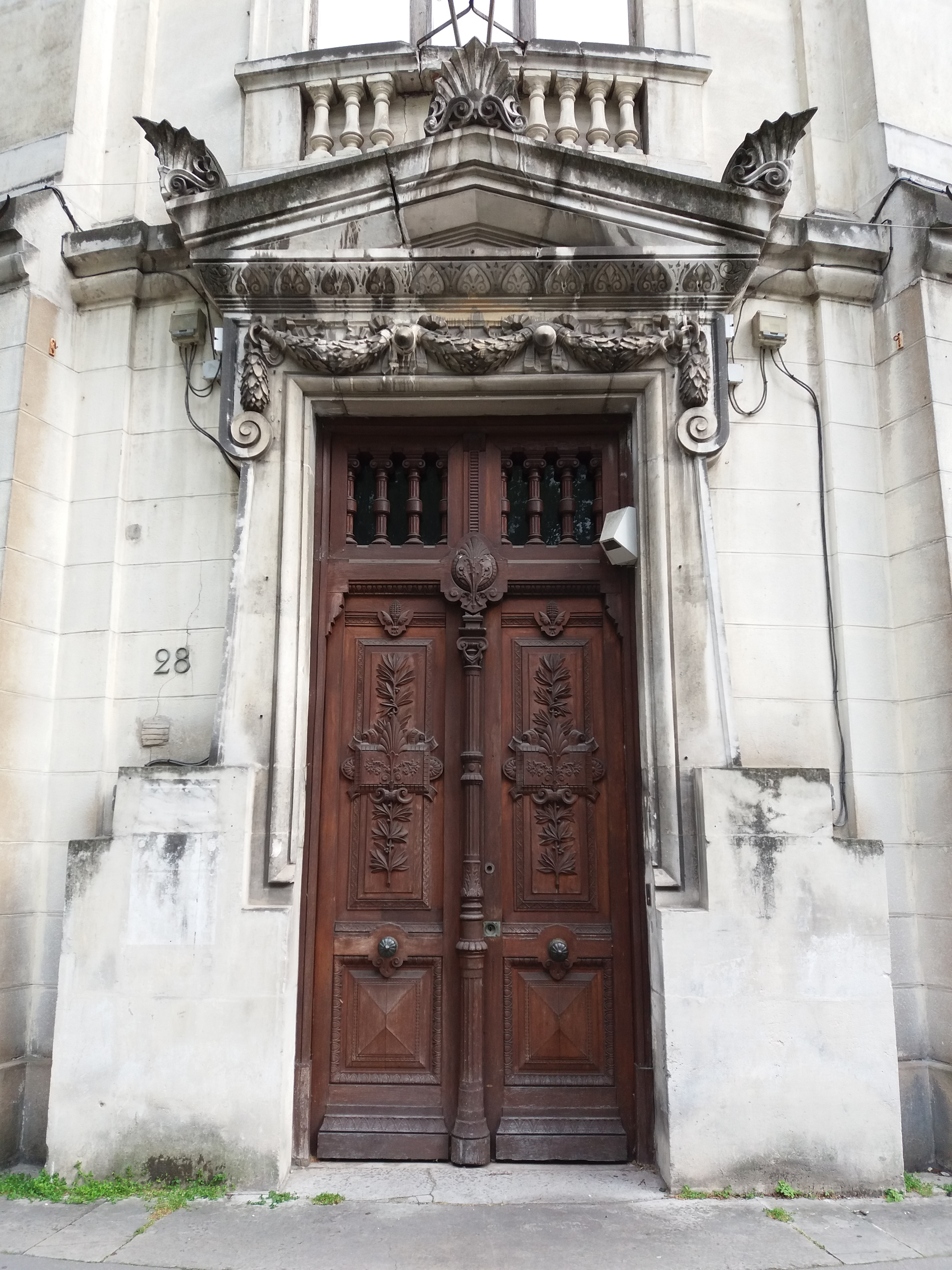
Neoclassical pediment with acroteria of a door of the Musée d'histoire naturelle - Guimet, Lyon, France, by Jules Chatron, 1879

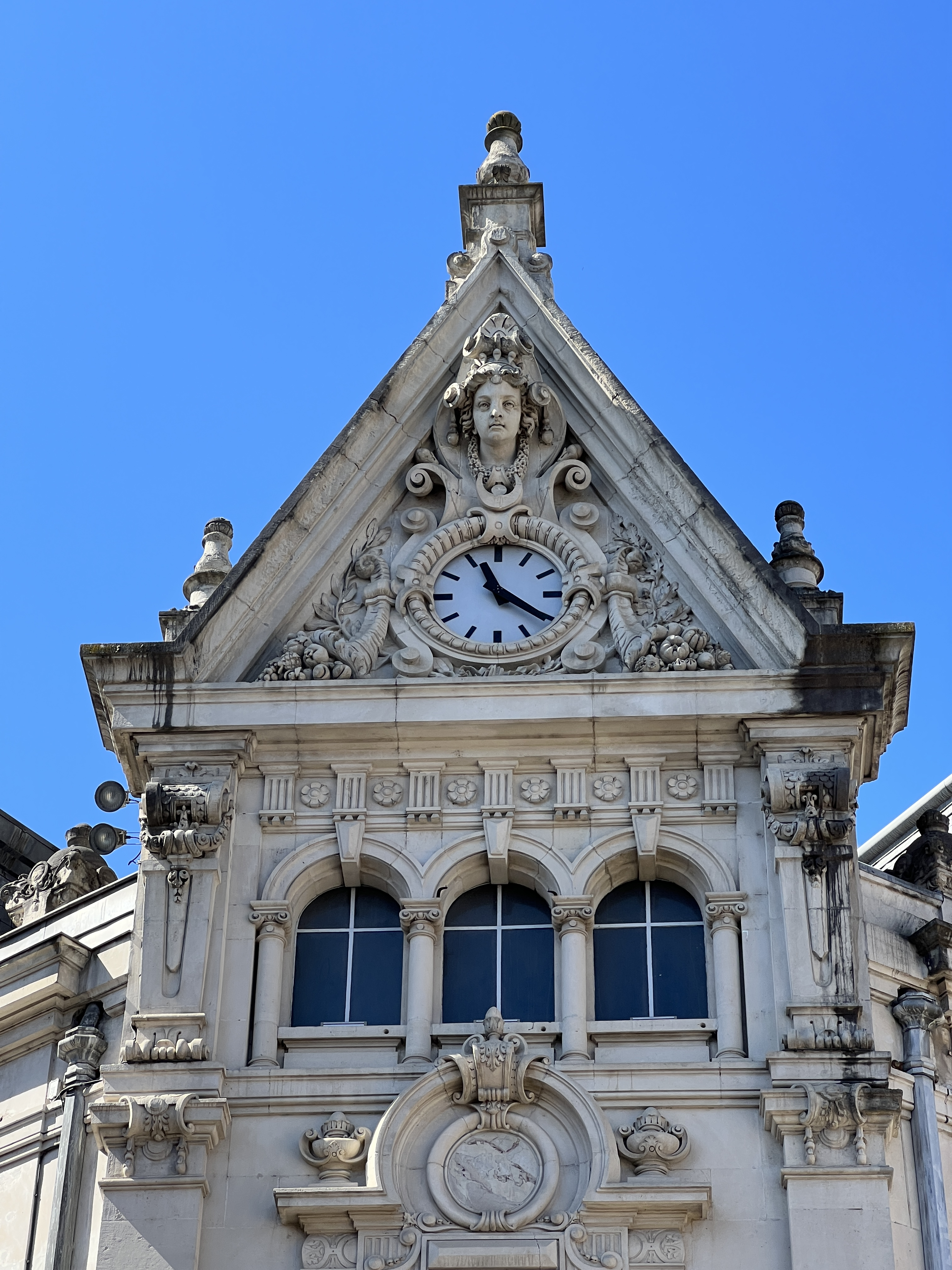
Renaissance Revival pediment of the Hôtel de la Caisse d'épargne de Dijon (Rue des Bons-Enfants no. 8), Dijon, France, by Arthur Chaudouet, 1889–1890

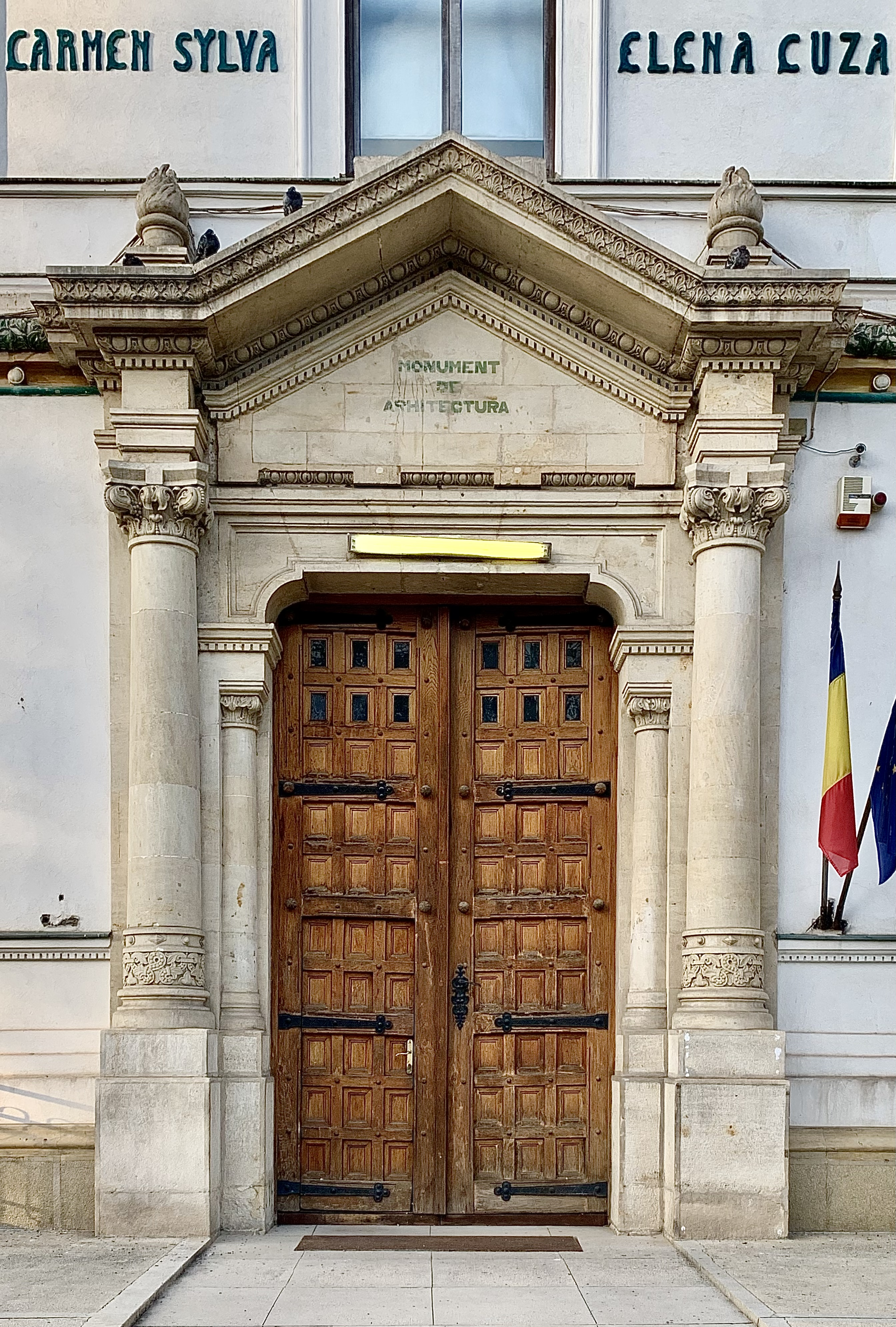
Romanian Revival door pediment of the Școala Centrală National College, Bucharest, Romania, by Ion Mincu, 1890

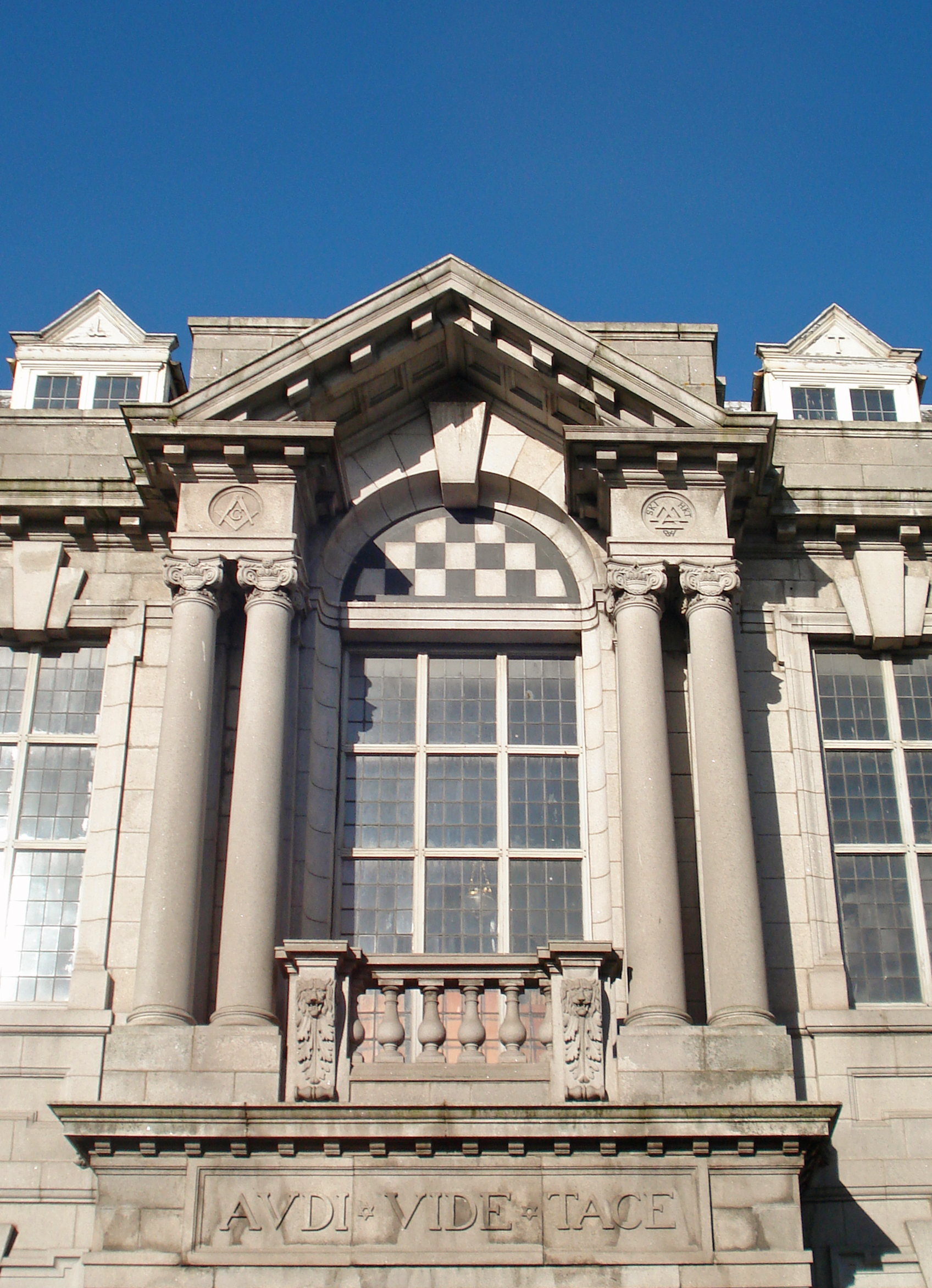
Open pediment above an arch; Masonic Temple, Aberdeen, 1910

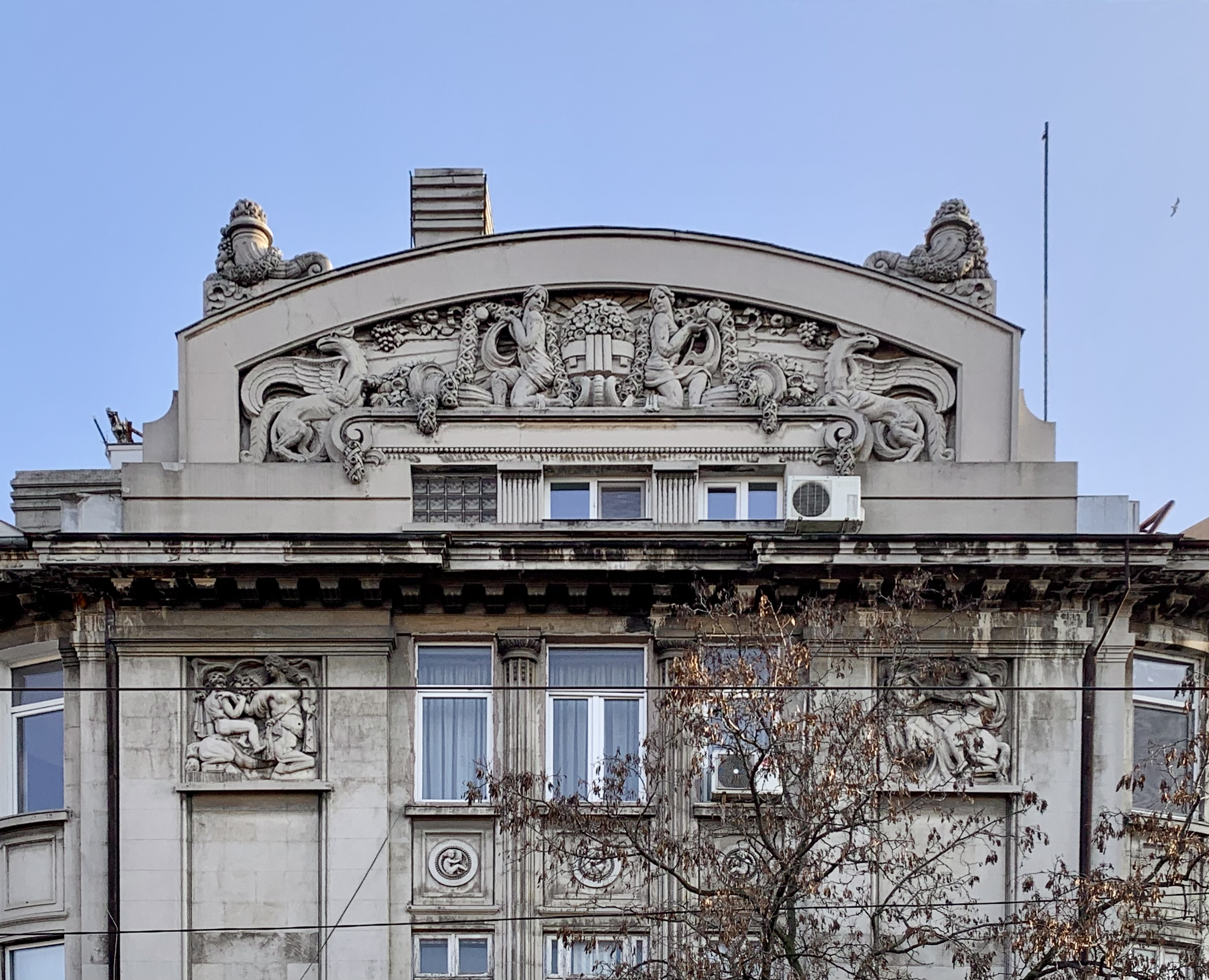
Art Deco pediment of the Mihai Zisman House (Calea Călărașilor no. 44), Bucharest, by architect Soru, 1920

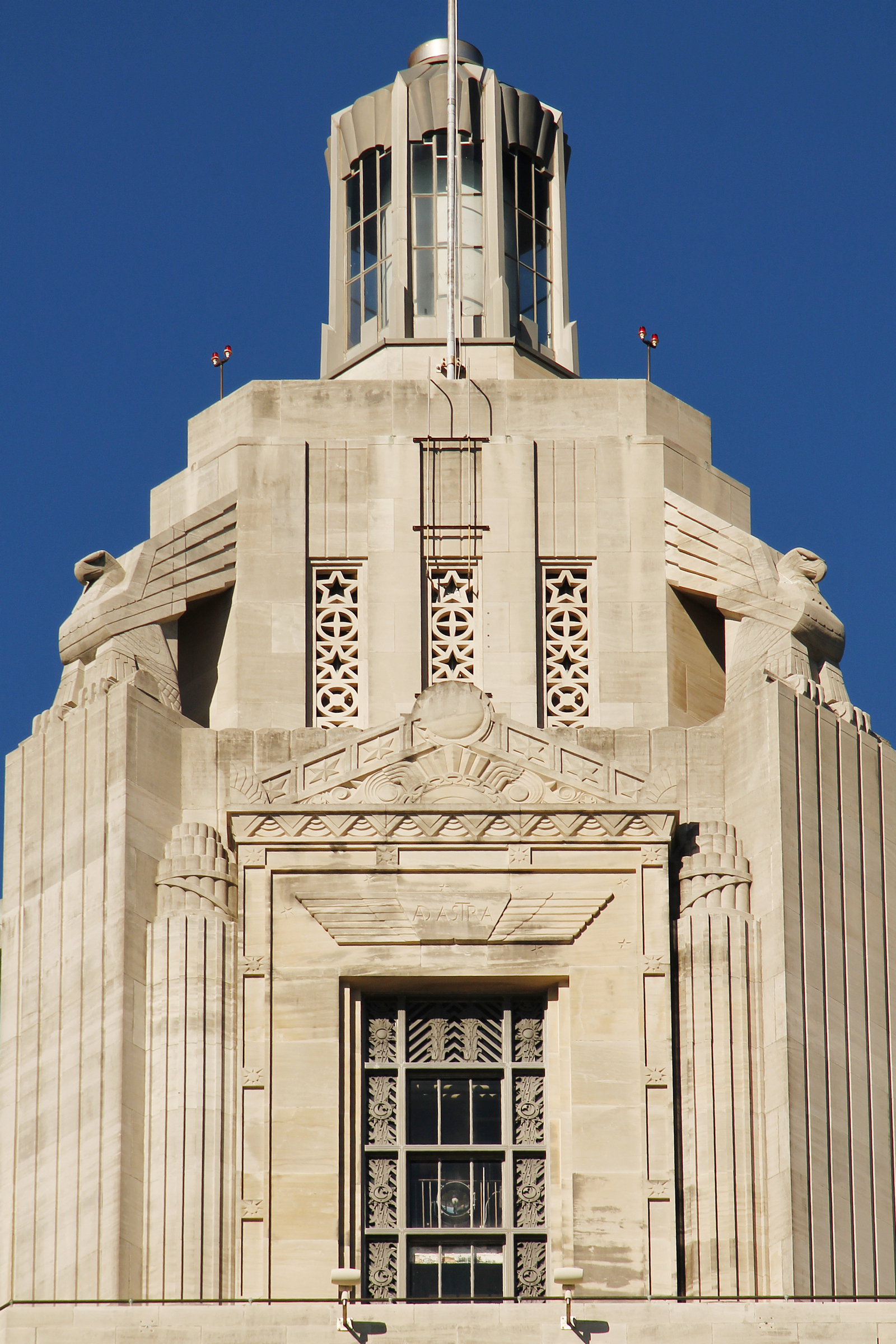
Art Deco near-pediment of the Louisiana State Capitol, 1930-1932

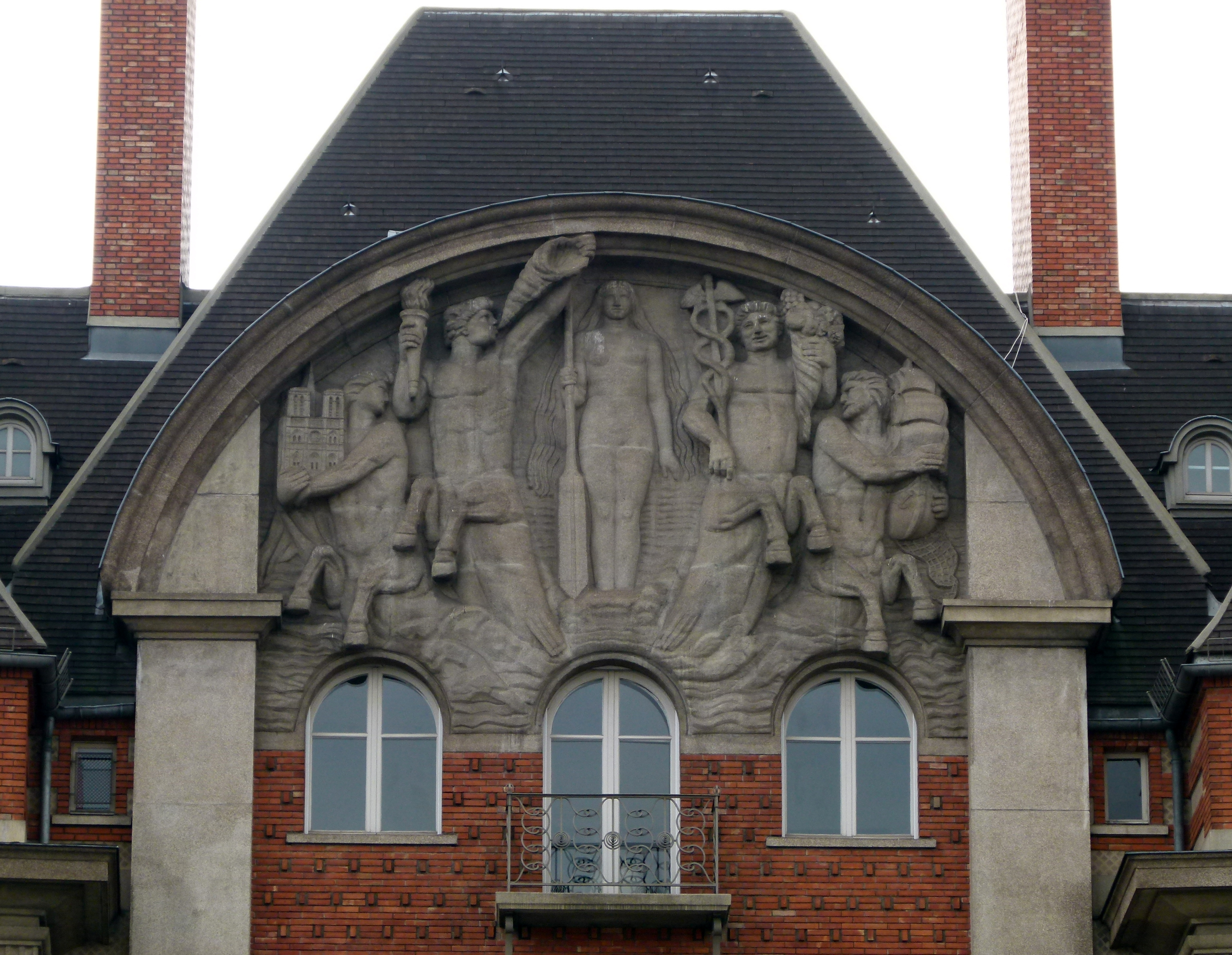
Art Deco pediment of the Carrefour Curie (Quai de Conti no. 1-3), Paris, by Joseph Marrast and Charles Letrosne, 1932

=== Postmodern reinterpretations ===
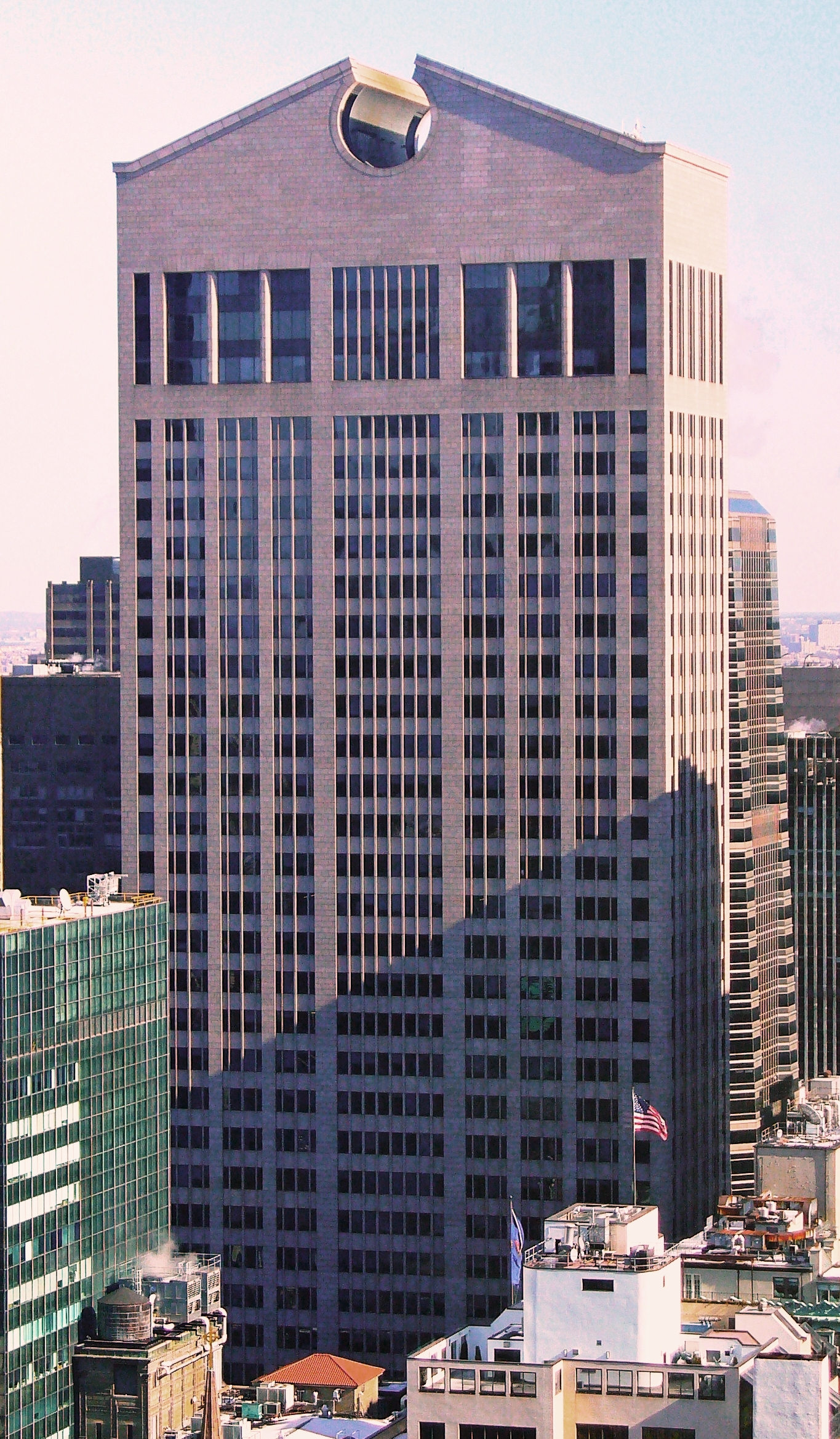
550 Madison Avenue, New York, by Philip Johnson, 1981-1984

Postmodernism, a movement that questioned Modernism (the status quo after WW2), promoted the inclusion of elements of historic styles in new designs. An early text questioning Modernism was by architect Robert Venturi, Complexity and Contradiction in Architecture (1966), in which he recommended a revival of the 'presence of the past' in architectural design. He tried to include in his own buildings qualities that he described as 'inclusion, inconsistency, compromise, accommodation, adaptation, superadjacency, equivalence, multiple focus, juxtaposition, or good and bad space.'

Venturi encouraged 'quotation', which means reusing elements of the past in new designs. Part manifesto, part architectural scrapbook accumulated over the previous decade, the book represented the vision for a new generation of architects and designers who had grown up with Modernism but who felt increasingly constrained by its perceived rigidities. Multiple Postmodern architects and designers put simplified reinterpretations of the pediment found in Classical decoration at the top of their creations. As with other elements and ornaments taken from styles of the pre-Modern past, they were in most cases highly simplified. Especially when it comes to office architecture, Postmodernism was only skin deep; the underlying structure was usually very similar, if not identical, to that of Modernist buildings.

In 1984 Philip Johnson designed what is now called 550 Madison Avenue in New York City (formerly known as the Sony Tower, Sony Plaza, and AT&T Building), a famous work of Post-Modern architecture, where a broken pediment at the top of a typical skyscraper wittily evokes a Thomas Chippendale-style tallboy at a massive scale. Marco Polo House in London (1989, now demolished) was similar.

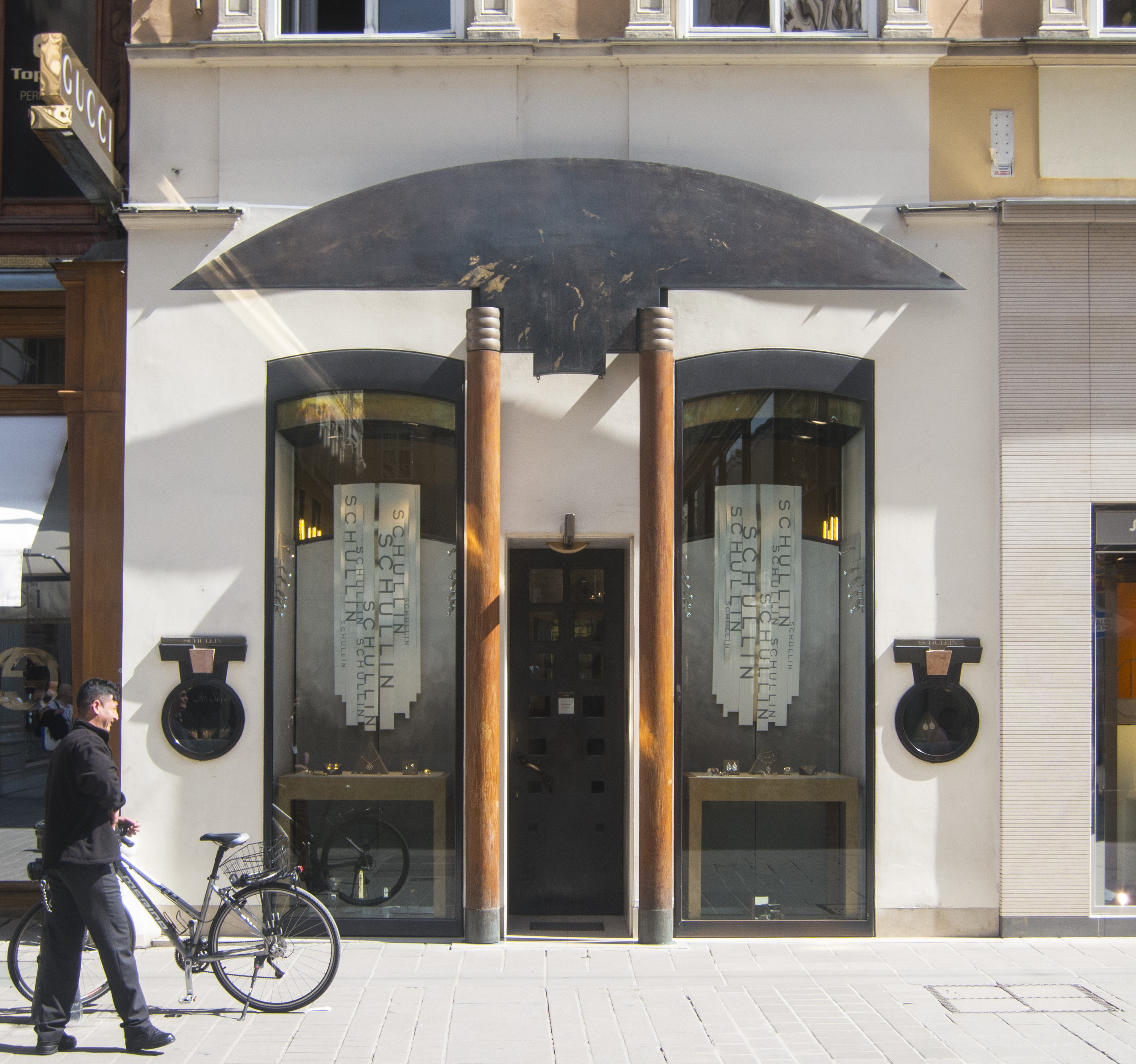
Schullin II jewelry boutique, Vienna, Austria, by Hans Hollein, 1982

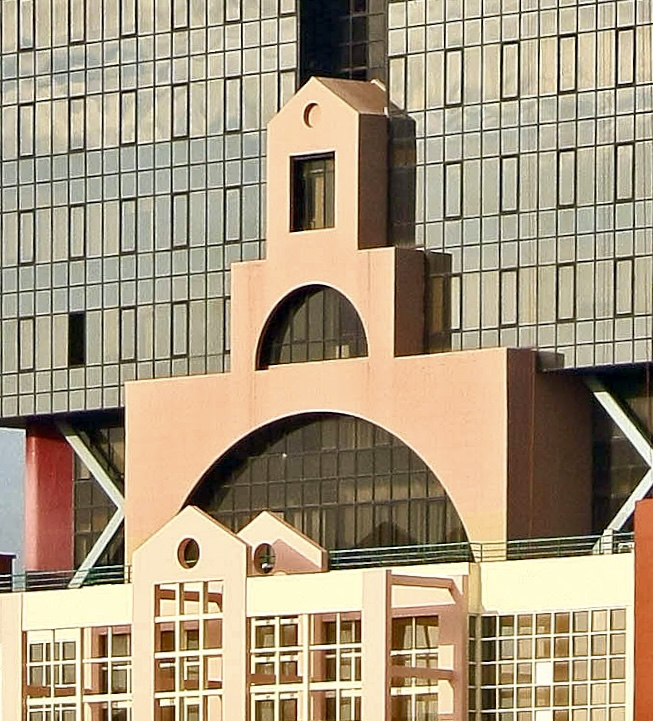
Torres das Amoreiras, Lisbon, Portugal, by Tomás Taveira, 1986

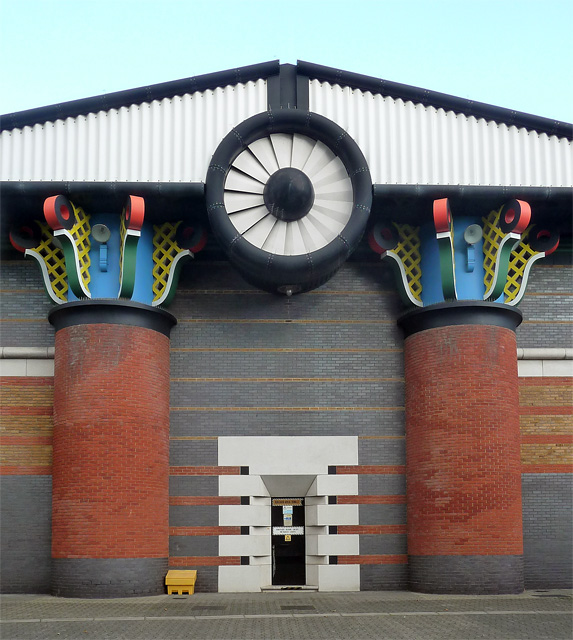
The Isle of Dogs Pumping Station, London, John Outram, 1988

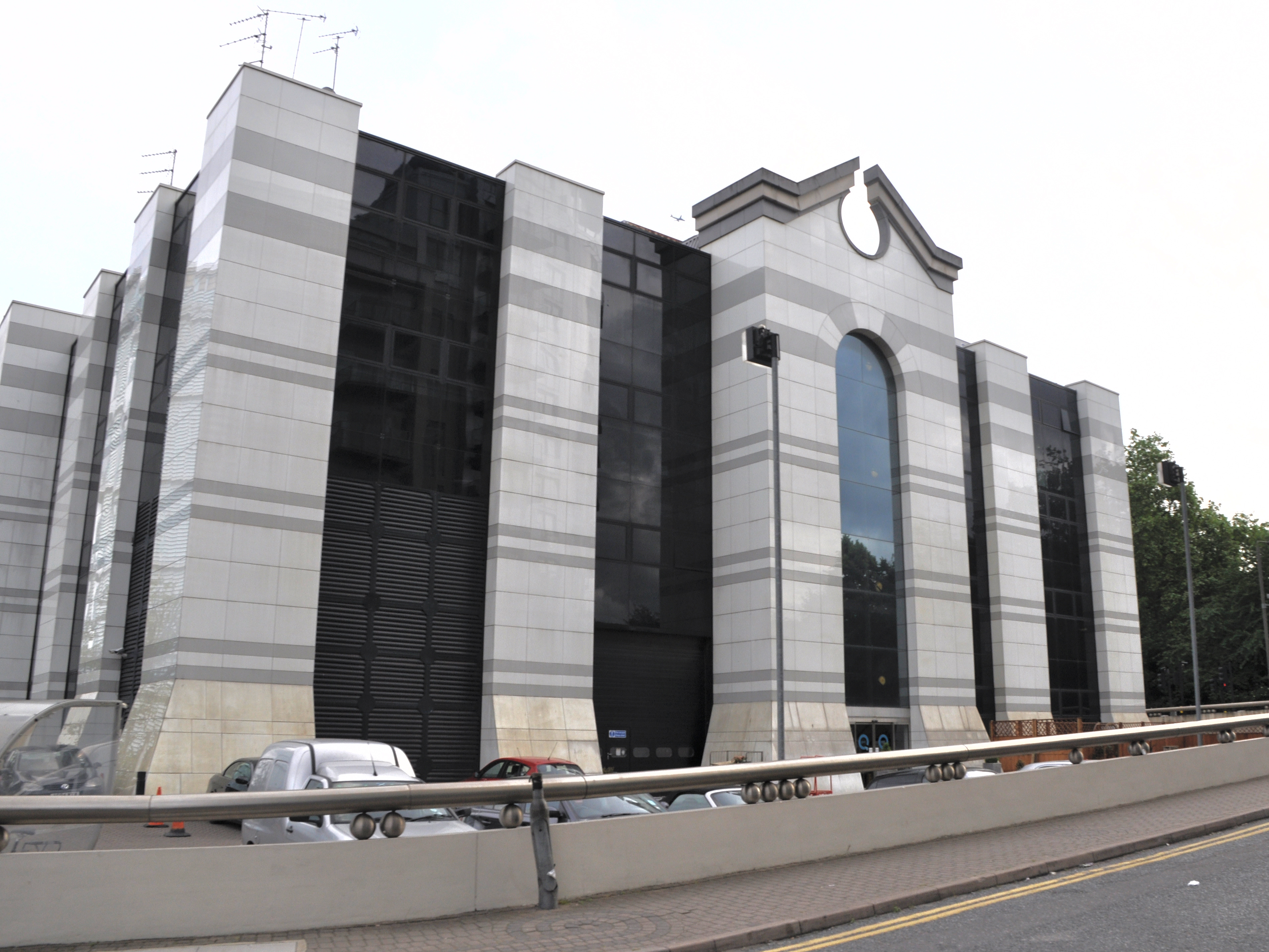
Marco Polo House, London, by Ian Pollard, 1987-1989

== See also ==
- Pedimental sculptures in Canada
- Pedimental sculptures in the United States
