= Gioacchino Ersoch =

Italian architect (1815–1902)

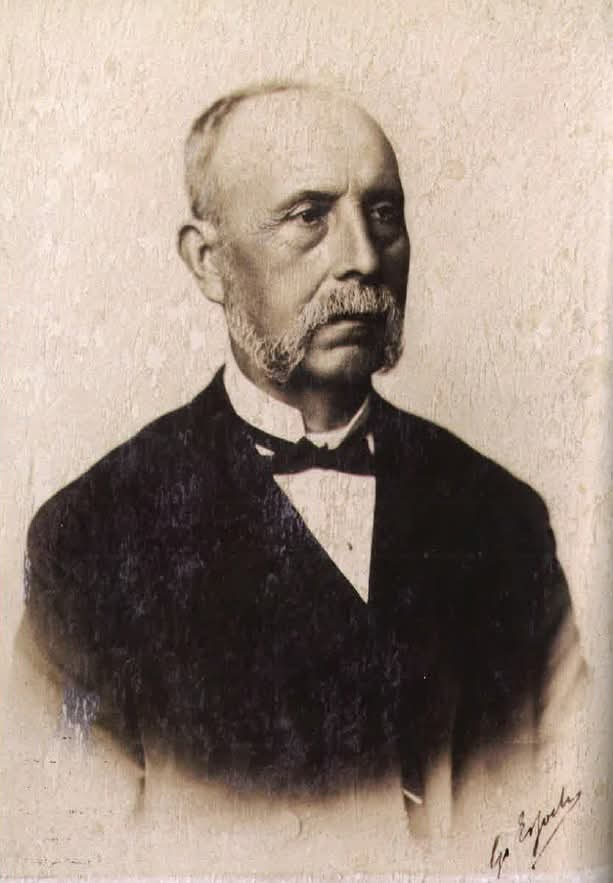
- Born: Joachim Herzog; 6 July 1815; Rome, Papal States
- Died: 12 June 1902 (aged 86); Rome, Kingdom of Italy
- Resting place: Campo Verano, Rome
- Education: Sapienza University of Rome
- Occupation: Architect
- Years active: 1839–1889
- Buildings: Testaccio slaughterhouse (1888–94; now part of the Museum of Contemporary Art of Rome)

Gioacchino Ersoch (Italian pronunciation: [dʒoakˈkiːno ˈɛrsok]; born Joachim Herzog; 6 July 1815 – 12 June 1902) was an Italian architect active in the urban planning of the city of Rome throughout the second half of the 19th century.

== Early life and education ==
Ersoch was born to papal official Giuseppe Herzog and his wife Teresa Rudolf von Rhor. His paternal family was originally from the Swiss town of Beromünster, in the Canton of Lucerne, and had subsequently relocated to Herznach, in Aargau; part of it had already moved to Rome around the mid-18th century. He later chose to Italianize his name, the first in his family to do so.

After attending gymnasium in Rome (1825–31), he obtained a bachelor's degree in Physics and Mathematics from Sapienza University (1832–33), where he stayed for a four-year apprenticeship in Architecture under Enrico Calderari, being lincensed in 1838.

== Career ==
Between 1839 and 1848, Ersoch worked as an architect for the Capitoline Chamber (the economic department of Papal Rome), then moving to the construction offices during the papacy of Pius IX.

In 1849, he oversaw the construction of public housing units next to San Crisogono and the renovation of Palazzo Senatorio on the Capitolium in order to make room for new municipal offices; both projects were designed by Calderari, with Ersoch completing them in 1850, shortly after Calderari's death in December 1849. He co-worked with Luigi Poletti at restoring some of Rome's city gates (1850) and at setting the grounds for the Column of the Immaculate Conception in Piazza di Spagna (1855). In 1859, he directed foundation works for Palazzo Fiano, located at the intersection of Via del Corso and Piazza San Lorenzo in Lucina, during which some remains of the Ara Pacis were discovered. The owner of the palace, Marco Boncompagni Ludovisi Ottoboni, had commissioned Ersoch with a full makeover of the building according to his own project, but it would only be independently renovated in 1888 by Francesco Settimj.

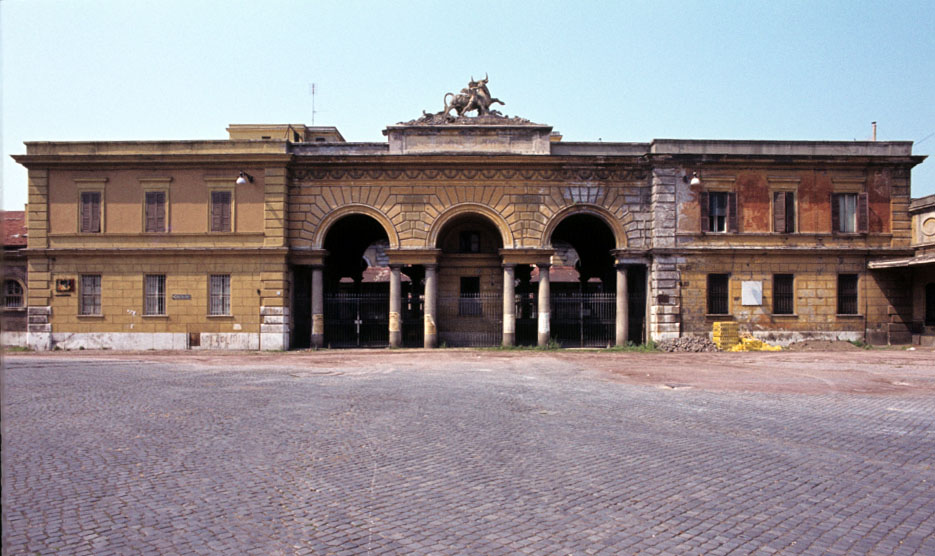
The entrance of the former Testaccio slaughterhouse in 1983

In 1859, Ersoch began designing a slaughterhouse for the Testaccio district of Rome, which would be built in 1888–90 and is the work he is best remembered for. This project, drawing from a thorough analysis of analogous structures in Italy and Europe, was part of the expansions works of the older slaughterhouse in Porta del Popolo/Piazza del Popolo (by Giuseppe Valadier), which also saw modernization efforts by Ersoch between 1850 and 1859 as well as architectural renovations and enlargement in 1868–69, serving as a model for the new Testaccio building. Nowadays, the complex houses part of the Museum of Contemporary Art of Rome as well as the headquarters of several organizations.

Since 1866, Ersoch also devoted himself to a plan for the redistribution of marketplaces across the city, taking up a 1812–13 project for indoor markets by Valadier which had been abandoned after the construction of the Piazza Monte d'Oro market. Ersoch's project was redrafted twice, in 1873 and 1875, to fit the new master plan for Rome – which by then had become the capital of the Kingdom of Italy. It envisioned a division of the city in twelve sectors, with wholesale markets located in San Vitale, Via Nazionale, Via di Ripetta, Central Station, Porta del Popolo and on the banks of the Tiber; and retail markets over the entire street network. Despite being considered by contemporaries as a pioneering project in Europe, the municipal administration never approved it, and the only marketplace that was constructed was the fish market of San Teodoro, which began operating in 1879 and is still in use today as a parking space.

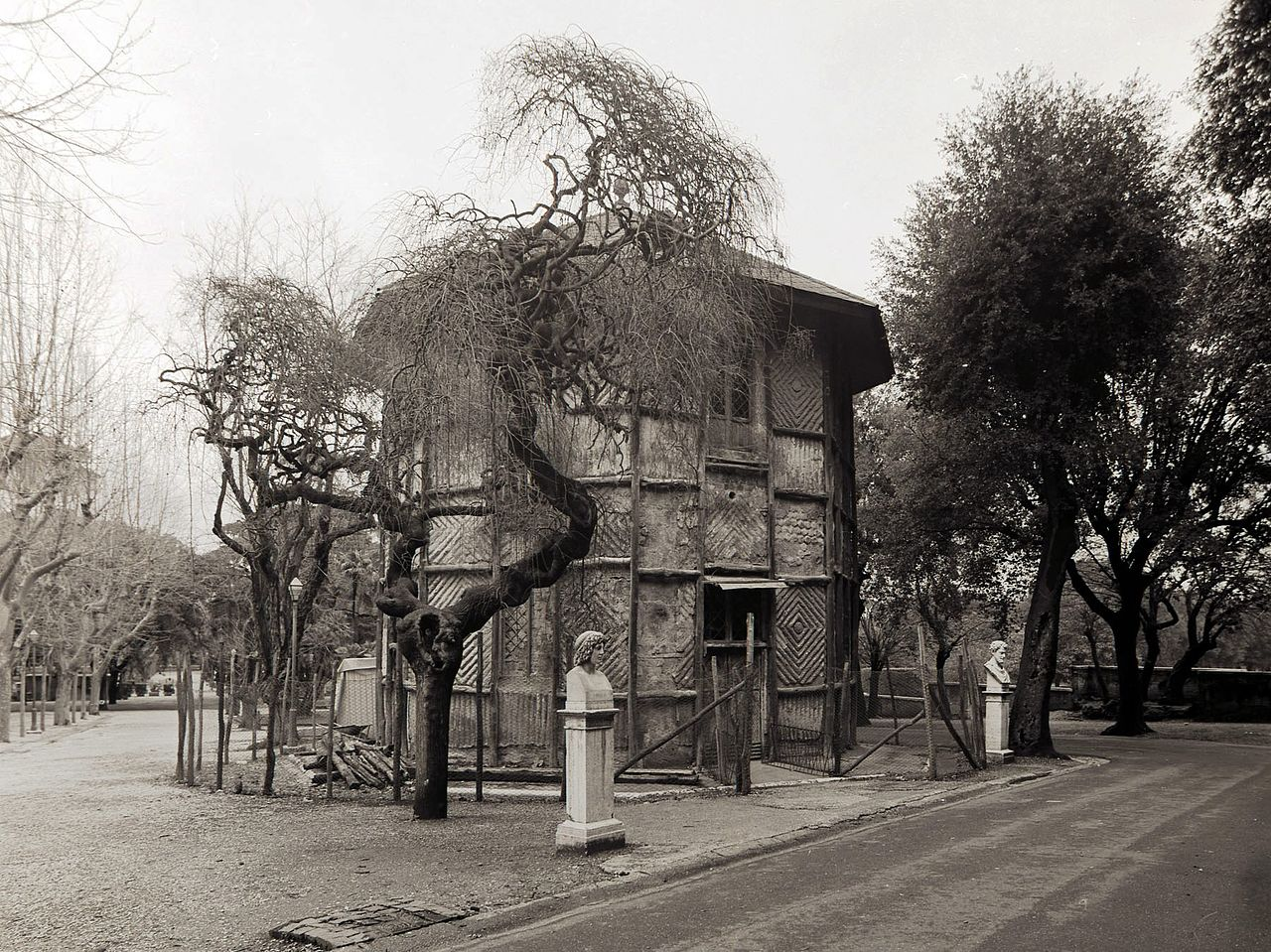
Ersoch's pavilion on the Pincian Hill

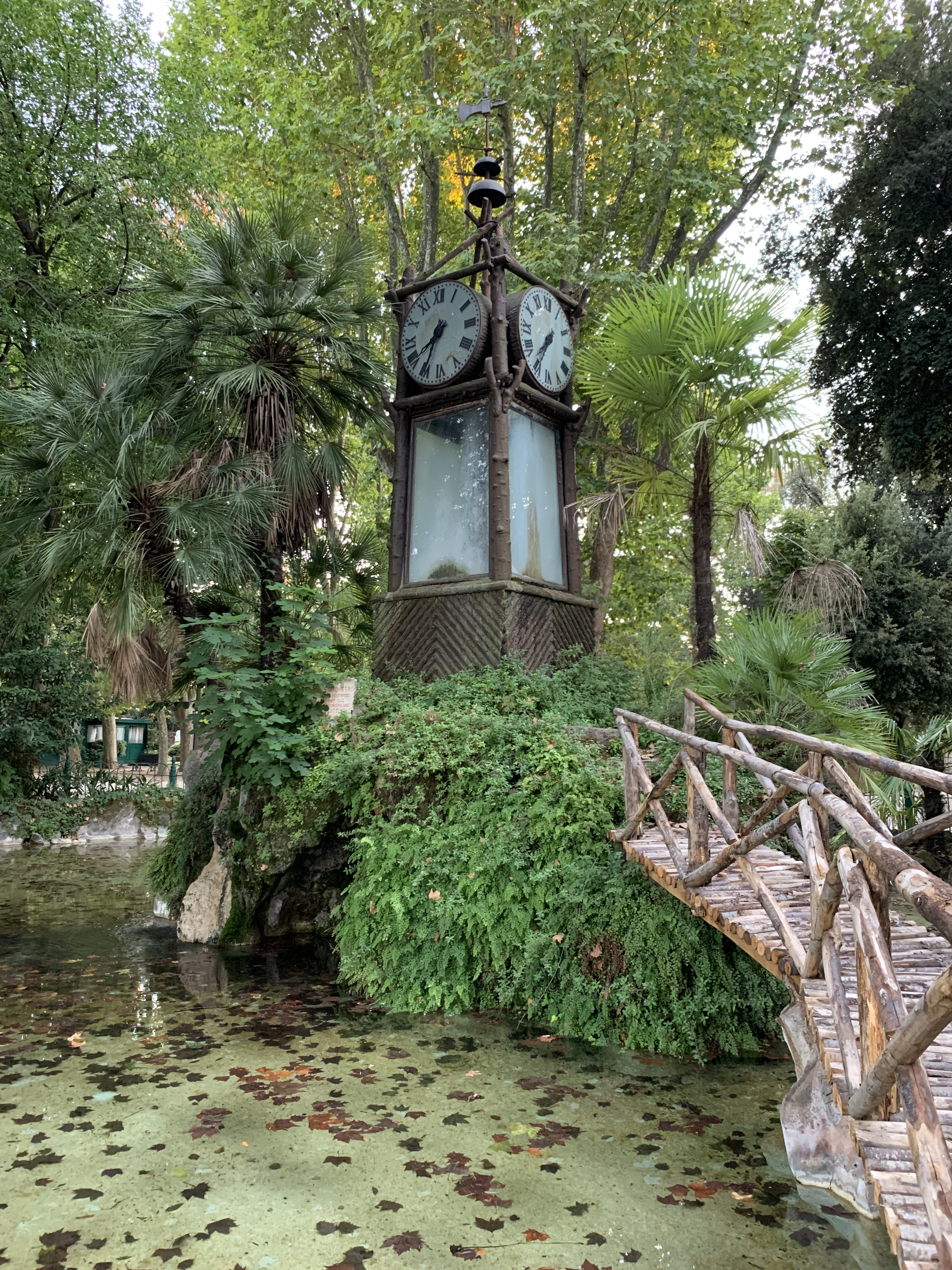
The Pincian hydrochronometer at Villa Borghese gardens

From 1860 on, Ersoch was active in urban decor as well. Russian prince Alexander Volkonsky (the son of Nikita Volkonsky and his wife Zinaida) commissioned him a Swiss-style wooden pavilion to be placed in the gardens of his family villa. A similar construction from 1873, known as the "Swiss chalet", is still present on the Pincian Hill, where he placed it as a cover for a water tank connected to the public irrigation system. The same year, he designed the Swiss-inspired architecture for the cast-iron tower around Giovan Battista Embriaco's Pincian hydrochronometer (presented at the 1867 Paris Expo), and was behind multiple other maintenance projects in the area between 1871 and 1889 – notably involving the pathway system and including iron balustrades, marble busts, a water network, pyrotechnic machines and the conversion of the Casina Valadier into a café.

Between 1872 and 1889, Ersoch designed fifteen temporary structures made from canvas and papier-mâché, which would be burned during the celebrations of certain public holidays – namely in Castel Sant'Angelo (1872–86) and the Pincian Hill (1887–89). He was the creator of a pyrotechnic machine on display at the 1888 International Fine Arts Exhibition of Munich, as well as of other decorative structures and devices for public events; these included the 1888 visit of Emperor Wilhelm II of Germany, when he made a linking architecture for the Capitoline Palaces from wood, stucco and papier-mâché, imitating the style of the actual buildings. Even though this was not an original idea (having previously been realized in 1818 and 1871), it was Ersoch's project that served as a basis in 1903, 1911 and 1930, when the buildings were joined again. For the same visit, the architect also conceived an Egyptian-style stage surrounding the Flaminio Obelisk in Piazza del Popolo and a welcome pavilion for the Emperor outside the station. He designed the catafalques for the funerals of Maria Vittoria dal Pozzo, Duchess of Aosta (1876) and Michelangelo Caetani, Duke of Sermoneta (1882), as well as for the memorial services for King Victor Emmanuel II (1881 and 1883).

Ersoch had been overseeing the renovation of spaces surrounding the Capitoline Palaces since 1870, as part of the efforts to make Rome fit its purpose as the capital city of Italy. In April 1871, he drafted a project to build the two Houses of Parliament on the Capitolium, which was positively received by the population but rejected by the government. He proposed the idea again in 1883, when the first public tender was opened, presenting a plan whereby the two chambers would be placed as a continuation of the ancient Tabularium.

In 1881, he submitted his own project in the bid for a monument to Victor Emmanuel II, which included a triumphal arch and an equestrian statue within a Pantheon-inspired architecture featuring Corinthian columns. Not only was his project discarded, but a private palace he had designed – namely Palazzo Mereghi near Palazzo Torlonia – was demolished following the construction of the monument in Piazza Venezia, and a building belonging to the Generali insurance company was erected in its place. It featured a combination of Roman and Florentine styles from the Quattrocento, unusual for the Roman Cinquecento-based style he adopted for most of the mansions he designed – such as Palazzo Topi, Palazzo Antonini, Palazzo Romualdi and his own house of Via Borgognona.

As a worker in the public administration, Ersoch dealt with several other projects – the enlargement and maintenance of the Campo Verano cemetery (1881–89), with a new entrance gate on Via Tiburtina among other things; the construction of sanitary infrastructures and cemeteries in the Roman countryside (1880–89); and the projects for a convitto nazionale (1882) and the main building of an archival institute in Via di Monte Caprino (1884). Most notably, he was responsible for the complete renovation of the Teatro Argentina in 1886–88, which saw the addition of four new staircases and an architectural makeover of the interiors; subsequent restorations in 1926 and 1967–71 have almost entirely undone his work.

== Final years and death ==
Ersoch was discharged from office on 16 March 1889, being nominated Architect Emeritus of the Municipality of Rome the following 6 July. He was allowed to assist for free the direction of the works for the Testaccio slaughterhouse and the related Campo Boario. His later years were marred by a legal litigation with the municipality, which he had sued for failing to pay his personal education, travel and job expenses; Ersoch's heirs ultimately lost the appeal in 1905.

Ersoch died in Rome in 1902 and was buried at the Campo Verano, which he had personally renovated.

== Legacy ==
Commemorating the 200th anniversary of his birth, Ersoch was celebrated in a 2015 exhibition of his projects, curated by Alessandro Cremona, Claudio Crescentini and Laura Francescangeli and held at Palazzo Braschi.

== Selected bibliography ==
- Compendio dei ragguagli delle diverse misure lineari superficiali e cubiche dei pesi e delle monete romane. Rome, 1863.
- Relazione sul progetto per piazze di mercato. Rome, 1866.
- Il mattatoio e il mercato del bestiame costruiti dal Comune negli anni 1888, 1891. Rome, 1891.
- Il nuovo mattatoio e mercato del bestiame. Siena, 1894.

== Sources ==
- Racheli, Alberto (1993). "ERSOCH, Gioacchino". Dizionario Biografico degli Italiani (in Italian). Vol. 43: Enzo–Fabrizi. Rome: Istituto dell'Enciclopedia Italiana. ISBN 978-88-12-00032-6.
- Mastromatteo, Gilberto (6 March 2022). "Un architetto dal gusto elvetico per la città eterna". tvsvizzera.it (in Italian).
