= 3703 Volkonskaya =

Main-belt asteroid binary

Discovery
- Discovered by: L. Chernykh; N. Chernykh
- Discovery site: Crimean Astrophysical Obs.
- Discovery date: 9 August 1978

Designations
- Named after: Mariya Volkonskaya (Russian princess)
- Alternative designations: 1978 PU_{3} · 1977 EK_{6}
- Minor planet category: main-belt · (inner); Vesta · Flora

Orbital characteristics
- Epoch 23 March 2018 (JD 2458200.5)
- Uncertainty parameter 0
- Observation arc: 64.21 yr (23,451 d)
- Aphelion: 2.6433 AU
- Perihelion: 2.0202 AU
- Semi-major axis: 2.3317 AU
- Eccentricity: 0.1336
- Orbital period (sidereal): 3.56 yr (1,301 d)
- Mean anomaly: 44.835°
- Mean motion: 0° 16^{m} 36.48^{s} / day
- Inclination: 6.7415°
- Longitude of ascending node: 172.94°
- Argument of perihelion: 152.39°
- Known satellites: 1 (D: 1.39 km P: 24 h)

Physical characteristics
- Mean diameter: 3.46±0.1 km (derived); 3.729±0.112 km 4.11 km (calculated)
- Synodic rotation period: 3.235±0.001 h
- Geometric albedo: 0.242±0.076; 0.24 (assumed)
- Spectral type: V
- Absolute magnitude (H): 14.1; 14.15±0.28; 14.3

3703 Volkonskaya, provisional designation 1978 PU_{3}, is a Vestian asteroid and asynchronous binary system from the inner regions of the asteroid belt, approximately 4 kilometers (2.5 miles) in diameter. It was discovered on 9 August 1978, by Soviet astronomers Lyudmila Chernykh and Nikolai Chernykh at the Crimean Astrophysical Observatory in Nauchnij, on the Crimean peninsula. It was named by the discoverers after the Russian princess Mariya Volkonskaya. The V-type asteroid has a rotation period of 3.2 hours. The discovery of its 1.4-kilometer minor-planet moon was announced in December 2005.

== Orbit and classification ==
Volkonskaya is a member of the Vesta family (401), when applying the hierarchical clustering method to its proper orbital elements. Vestian asteroids have a composition akin to cumulate eucrites (HED meteorites) and are thought to have originated deep within 4 Vesta's crust, possibly from the Rheasilvia crater, a large impact crater on its southern hemisphere near the South pole, formed as a result of a subcatastrophic collision. Vesta is the main belt's second-largest and second-most-massive body after Ceres. Based on osculating Keplerian orbital elements, the asteroid has also been classified as a member of the Flora family (402), a giant asteroid family and the largest family of stony asteroids in the main-belt.

Volkonskaya orbits the Sun in the inner asteroid belt at a distance of 2.0–2.6 AU once every 3 years and 7 months (1,301 days; semi-major axis of 2.33 AU). Its orbit has an eccentricity of 0.13 and an inclination of 7° with respect to the ecliptic. The body's observation arc begins with a precovery taken at the Palomar Observatory in August 1953, or 25 years prior to its official discovery observation at Nauchnij.

== Physical characteristics ==
Volkonskaya is a V-type asteroid.

=== Rotation period ===
In June 1996, a rotational lightcurve of Volkonskaya was obtained from photometric observations by American astronomer William Ryan. Lightcurve analysis gave a well-defined rotation period of 3.235 hours with a brightness amplitude of 0.22 magnitude (U=3).

=== Diameter and albedo ===
According to the survey carried out by the NEOWISE mission of NASA's Wide-field Infrared Survey Explorer, Volkonskaya measures 3.729 kilometers in diameter and its surface has an albedo of 0.242, while the Collaborative Asteroid Lightcurve Link assumes an albedo of 0.24 – derived from 8 Flora, the parent body of the Flora family – and calculates a diameter of 4.11 kilometers based on an absolute magnitude of 14.1.

=== Satellite ===
The photometric observations by William Ryan and collaborators also showed that Volkonskaya is an asynchronous binary asteroid with a minor-planet moon orbiting it every 24 hours at an estimated average distance of 7.8 km. The discovery was announced in December 2005. The mutual occultation events suggest the presence of a satellite with an estimated diameter 1.39 km or 40% the size of its primary.

== Naming ==
This minor planet was numbered on 7 October 1987. It was named after Russian princess Mariya Volkonskaya (1805–1865), wife of Sergey Volkonsky a Russian General Decembrist. She voluntarily followed her husband to exile in Siberia. The official naming citation was published by the Minor Planet Center on 25 September 1988 (M.P.C. 13609).
