= Nikolay Raevsky =

Russian general and statesman (1771–1829)

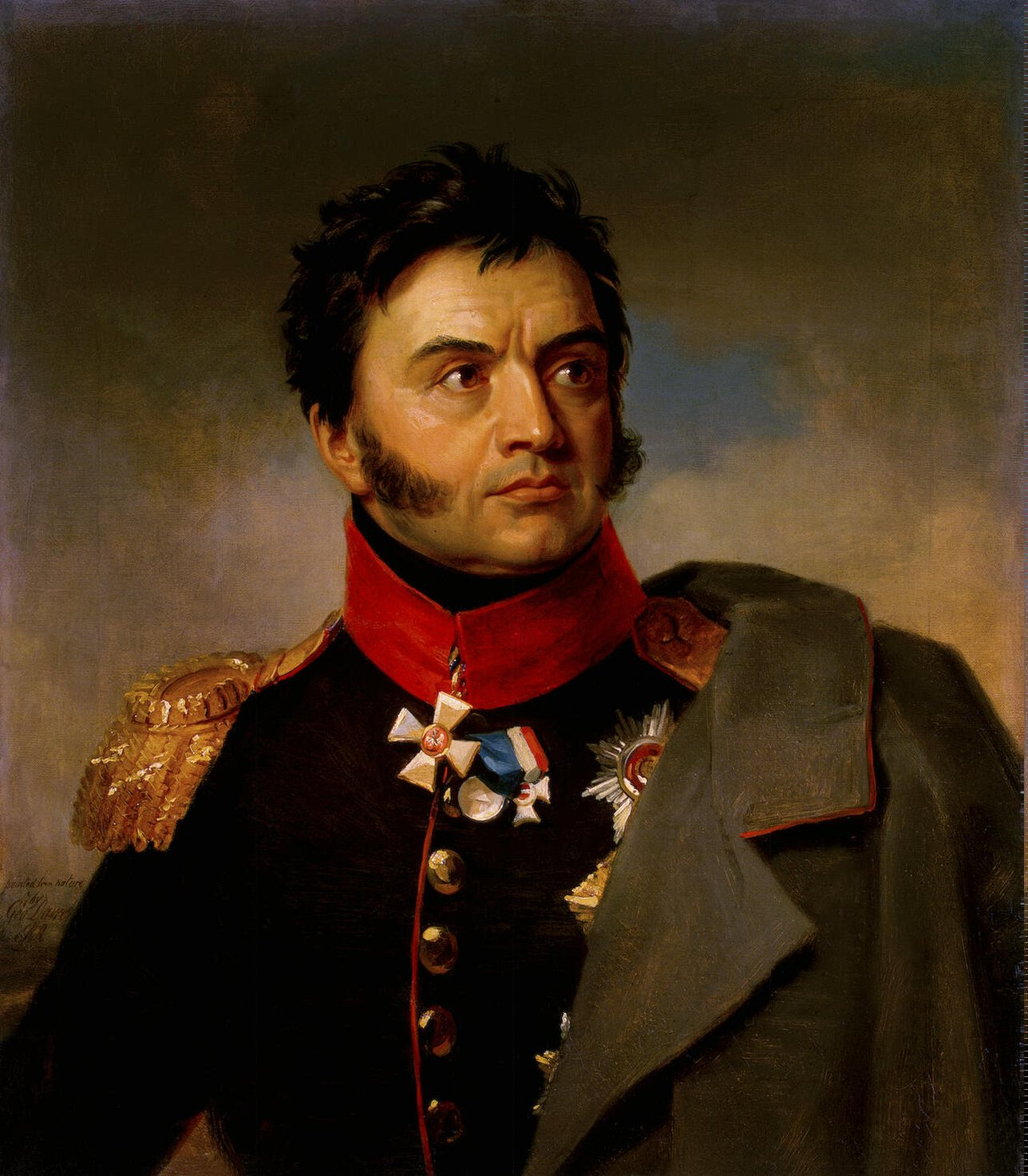
Portrait by George Dawe, before 1825

Nikolay Nikolayevich Raevsky or Rayevsky (Russian: Николай Николаевич Раевский; 25 September [O.S. 14 September] 1771 – 28 September [O.S. 16 September] 1829) was a Russian general and statesman who achieved fame for his feats of arms during the Napoleonic Wars. His family left a lasting legacy in Russian society and culture.

== Early life ==
Nikolay Raevsky was born in Saint Petersburg. He descended from the Rayevsky noble family which has claimed remote Scandinavian and Polish–Lithuanian ancestry. One of Peter the Great's great grandmothers came from the Raevsky family. Nikolay's grandfather, Semyon Raevsky, was the Prosecutor of the Holy Synod.

The family rose to prominence in Russia when Raevsky's father, Colonel Nikolay Semyonovich Raevsky, commander of the elite Izmaylovsky Regiment, married Ekaterina Samoylova. Ekaterina was a lady-in-waiting and close friend of Empress Catherine II, and a niece of the Empress' influential favorite, Prince Potemkin. Ekaterina's brother was the general and statesman, Count Alexander Samoylov.

Raevsky's father was killed in action in or around Iaşi during the Russo-Turkish War of 1768–1774, several months before the birth of his son. Not long after his father's death, the Empress arranged for Raevsky's mother to marry a wealthy landowner, Lev Davydov, who proved to be a generous stepfather.

Raevsky was enrolled in the Leib-Guard Semyonovsky Regiment at a very early age. On 30 April 1777, he was promoted to Sergeant and on 1 January 1786 to Ensign. On 23 February 1789 he was transferred to the Nizhegorodsky Dragoon Regiment with the rank of premier-major. With this regiment he took part in the Russo-Turkish War of 1787–1792 and distinguished himself at Bendery and Akkerman. In recognition of his valor, Raevsky was promoted on 1 September 1790 to Lieutenant Colonel and became the chief of a Cossack regiment.

After the peace treaty was concluded, he took part in the Polish–Russian War of 1792 with the Nizhegorodsky Dragoon Regiment. For this campaign he received on 28 June 1792 the Order of St. George of the 4th degree and the gold sword with an inscription for bravery.

When the war with Persia erupted in 1796, Raevsky, under command of Count Valerian Zubov, took part in the taking of Derbent and in other engagements.

Upon his ascension to the throne, Emperor Paul I recalled the army to Russia, and had Raevsky dismissed from the military because of his relationship to Prince Potemkin, whom Paul detested. After Paul's murder, and Alexander I's assumption of the throne, Raevsky rejoined the army and was promoted to the rank of Major General.

== Napoleonic Wars ==
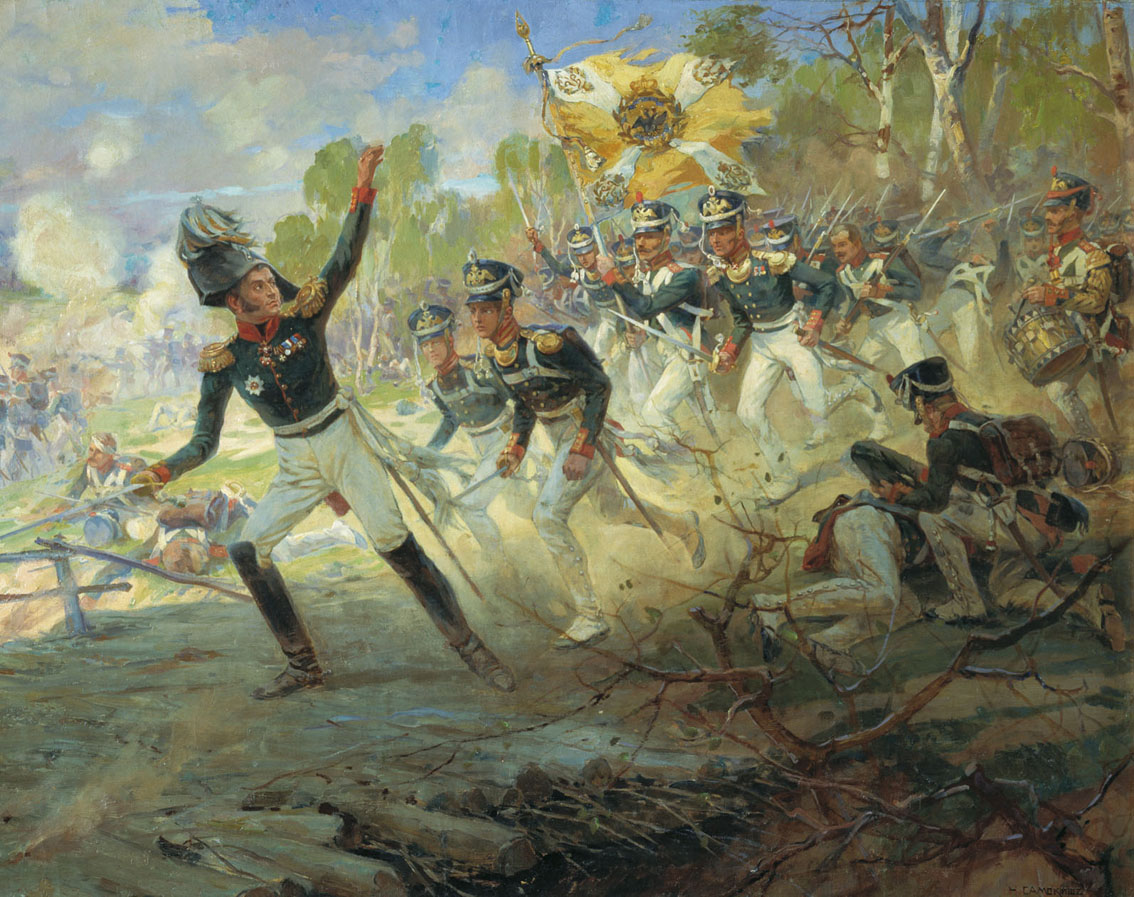
Raevsky leading his troops in battle, painting by Nikolay Samokish, 1912

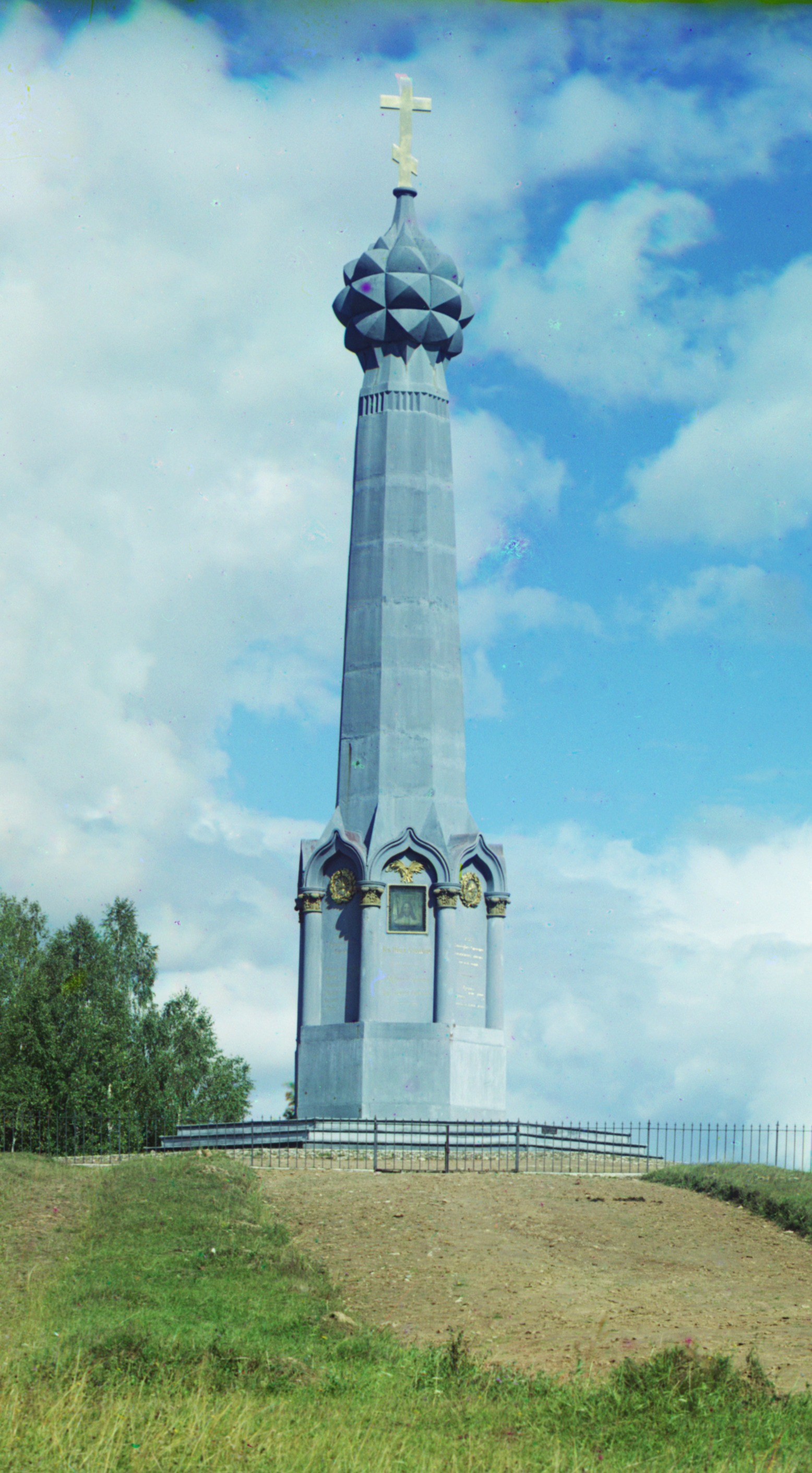
The great monument on the Raevsky redoubt was dedicated by Nicolas I in 1839

After Russia's failures at the outbreak of the Napoleonic Wars, Raevsky returned into the field on 25 April 1807. He served with Prince Pyotr Bagration in the vanguard of the Russian army. During the campaign of 1806–1807, Raevsky distinguished himself in numerous battles, and was awarded the Order of St. Vladimir of the 3rd degree. Raevsky, who had sustained a wound in the Battle of Heilsberg, commanded chasseurs of the advance guard in the Battle of Friedland.

After the Treaty of Tilsit was concluded, Raevsky fought in the Finnish War, and was present at every major engagement. For this campaign, Raevsky received the Order of St. Vladimir of the 2nd degree and obtained the rank of Lieutenant General. After conclusion of the war with Finland, he followed Count Nikolay Kamensky to the "Army of Moldavia", which took its name after its location, and participated in the Russo-Turkish War, 1806–12, taking Silistra.

During Napoleon's Invasion of Russia, Raevsky led the 7th Infantry Corps, a part of the 2nd Army led by Prince Pyotr Bagration. In the advance guard, Raevsky was responsible for delaying Davout's advance towards Moscow. After the Battle of Saltanovka, he retreated to Smolensk, where he took part in the battle for the city. During the Battle of Borodino, he protected the right wing of the Russian Army, better known as the Raevsky Redoubt, winning the Order of St. George of the 3rd degree. Later he pursued La Grande Armée and took part in the Battle of Maloyaroslavets and Battle of Krasnoi, in which he helped defeat Marshal Ney.

Raevsky commanded a Grenadier Corps and protected the retreat of main forces during the Battle of Bautzen. After Austria and Prussia joined the Allies, Raevsky's corps joined the Army of Bohemia commanded by Karl Philipp Fürst zu Schwarzenberg. He received the Order of St. Vladimir of the 1st degree for the Battle of Kulm. Near Wachau, he was seriously injured. For his feats of arms he was promoted to the rank of General (October 8, 1813) and received the Austrian Military Order of Maria Theresa of the 3rd degree. When the Russian army entered Saxony, Raevsky was forced to return to Russia because of his poor health.

Having recovered from his illness, Raevsky rejoined the army during the battle of Leipzig, commanding two grenadier corps. When at the Rhine, he took over command from Peter Wittgenstein and leading this army during the taking of Paris. After Napoleon's defeat, General Raevsky was given the honor of entering Paris at Alexander I's side on March 31st, 1814.

== Later years and family ==
In 1794, Raevsky married Sofia Alexandrovna Konstantinova, the granddaughter and heiress of the scientist Mikhail Lomonosov. Sofia brought with her a substantial dowry, consisting of an estate at Oranienbaum with over six thousand serfs. The Raevskys had six children, two sons and four daughters. After the Napoleonic Wars ended, Raevsky settled with his family at Boltyshka, an estate left to him by his stepfather. Boltyshka was a large estate near the banks of the Dnieper River in Kirovohrad Oblast, Ukraine; the land was fertile and there were over ten thousand serfs to cultivate it.

In May 1821, during a visit to the Caucasus, Raevsky befriended a young Alexander Pushkin and traveled with him to the Crimea. Pushkin would form close friendships with Raevsky's sons, his sons-in-law, and his half-brother, Vasily Davydov – all members of the Southern Society that helped plot the Decembrist Revolt of 1825. The General's eldest son, Alexander, served as the model for the protagonist of Pushkin's poem The Demon. While Raevsky's daughter Maria's youthful frolics inspired Pushkin to write some of the most famous lines in Russian literature ("Eugene Onegin", I-XXXIII).

Raevsky's favorite child, Maria, was wed at the age of nineteen to Prince Sergey Volkonsky, a wealthy, liberal aristocrat, who had fought alongside General Raevsky during the Napoleonic Wars. Raevsky's eldest daughter, Ekaterina, married the wealthy young General Mikhail Fyodorovich Orlov, also a veteran of the Napoleonic Wars.

Once interested in discussion of liberal reforms, western democracy, and the teachings of the Enlightenment philosophers, by 1825 Raevsky had abandoned his youthful idealism, rejecting the notion that Russia could be anything other than an absolute monarchy. Both of Raevsky's sons and his son-in-law, Mikhail Orlov, withdrew from the Southern Society long before the Decembrist Revolt occurred, and took no part in the uprising. Raevsky's half-brother, Vasily Davydov, and Prince Volkonsky, remained in the Society. They were arrested along with their fellow conspirators days after the uprising in December 1825, and were taken to Saint Petersburg. They were held for several months, interrogated, tried, and sentenced to hard labor and exile in Siberia. Against her father's wishes, Maria fought for the right to accompany her husband to Siberia, and managed to personally persuade the Emperor to allow her to share Prince Volkonsky's exile. The Volkonskys would remain in Siberia for more than thirty years. They were only allowed to return to European Russia after the death of Nicholas I, having received a pardon from his son, Alexander II. Maria's courage, and that of the other Decembrist wives, was romanticized by Nekrasov in the poem "Russian Women".

Raevsky died at Boltyshka four years after the Decembrist Revolt, a broken and embittered man, of pneumonia contracted while travelling to petition the Emperor for leniency on his daughter's behalf. As he lay dying, he is said to have looked at a portrait of his daughter Maria and whispered: "That is the most remarkable woman I have ever known in my life."

== Legacy ==
Since 2014, the FSUE Rosmorport Azovo-Chernomorsky Basin Branch has been operating a tugboat named "General Rayevsky".

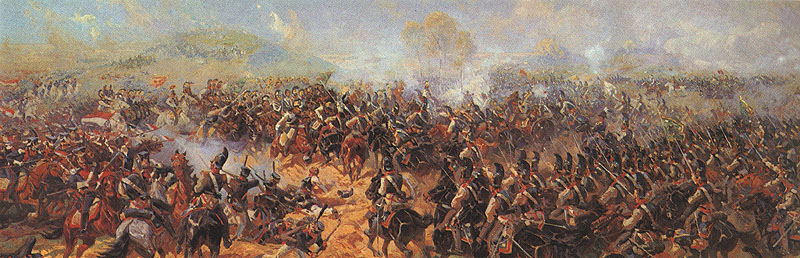
Raevsky Battery at Borodino, a fragment of Roubaud's panoramic painting
