= Nikita Volkonsky =

Russian general (1781–1844)

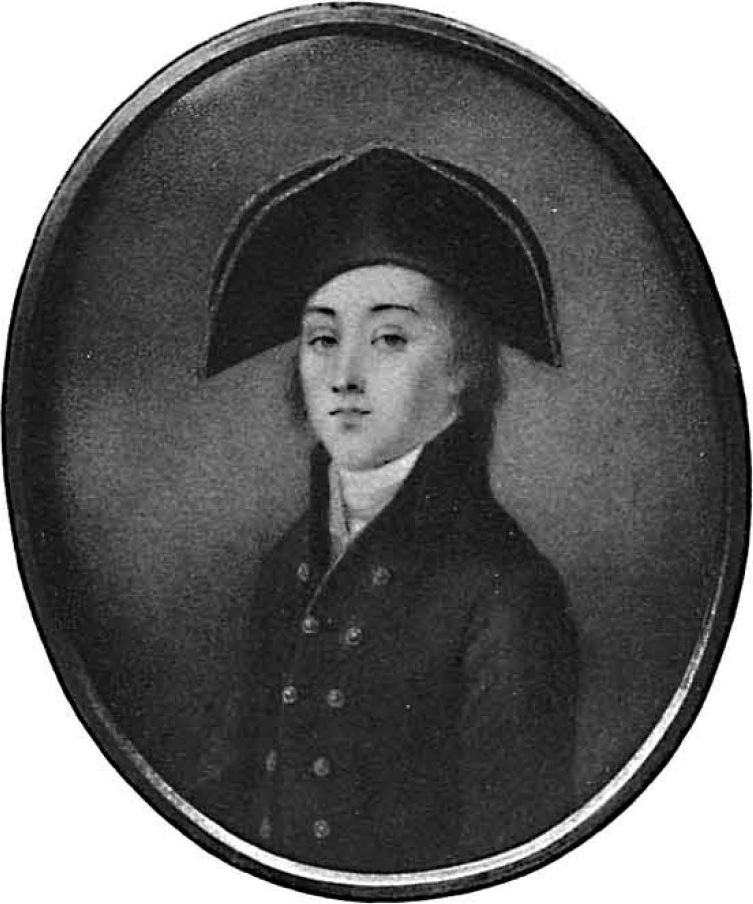
Nikita Volkonsky; from Russian portraits of the 18th and 19th centuries.

Prince Nikita Grigorievich Volkonsky (9 July 1781, Moscow, Russian Empire – 6 December 1844, Assisi, Italy) was a Russian general from the Volkonsky family. He took part in the Napoleonic wars and later converted from Orthodoxy to Roman Catholicism.

== Family ==
Nikita's father was Prince Grigory Volkonsky, one of Suvorov's leading generals. His mother was the daughter and heiress of Prince Nikolai Repnin. His siblings included Prince Sergey Volkonsky, one of the prominent Decembrists, and Prince Nikolai Repnin-Volkonsky, the owner of Yagotin.

In 1810, Nikita married Princess Zinaida Beloselskaya-Belozerskaya (1792-1862) - writer, poet, singer and composer, Princess was a prominent figure of the Russian cultural life of the first half of the 19th century and was also a Catholic convert from Russian Orthodoxy. Their marriage gave birth to one son:

- Alexander (1811-1878), Privy Councillor.

== Career ==
Volkonsky graduated from the First Cadet Corps. On 9 October 1792 recorded the ensign Praporshchik in Izmaylovsky Regiment. On 1 January 1796 hired by a second lieutenant in the same regiment. On 16 November 1800 Volkonsky dismissed from military service with the rank of captain. On 15 September 1801 he became a chamberlain adopted by the imperial court. On 15 January 1807 Volkonsky re-entered military service with the rank of lieutenant colonel and in the army was appointed adjutant to General Ivan Michelson - Commander of the Moldavian army. He participated in the battles against the Turks, won several awards, including a gold sword "for his bravery." On 15 September 1807 he was promoted to colonel and appointed adjutant to Alexander I. On 28 July 1812 Volkonsky was appointed composed of the Saint Petersburg militia, took part in the Second Battle of Polotsk, between October 6–7, and was wounded by a grenade in his right side, so that the 20 October 1812 he retired. On December 19 of that year he returned to work and was in the retinue Alexander I. In 1813 he participated in the Battle of Lutzen, Battle of Bautzen and Battle of Dresden. On September 15 of the same year he was made major general with admission to the Sweet. For distinction in Battle of Leipzig he was awarded with a gold sword "for bravery" with diamonds. In 1814 he fought at Battle of Brienne, Battle of La Rothière, Battle of Bar-sur-Aube, Battle of Arcis-sur-Aube, Battle of Fere-Champenoise and Battle of Paris (1814).

In 1815 he accompanied Alexander I on the trip to the Congress of Vienna. On 6 December 1827 was promoted to Jägermeister, in Russia corresponding the position of full general, listing a Privy Councillor.

At the end of his life, converted to Catholicism from his Orthodox religion by birth and moved to Italy. He was buried in the Santi Vincenzo e Anastasio a Trevi church, .

== Sources ==
Russian Archive: Sat - M .: studio "TRITE" H. Mikhalkov, 1996. - T. VII. - S. 342.
