= Hydrochronometer =

Water-powered clock

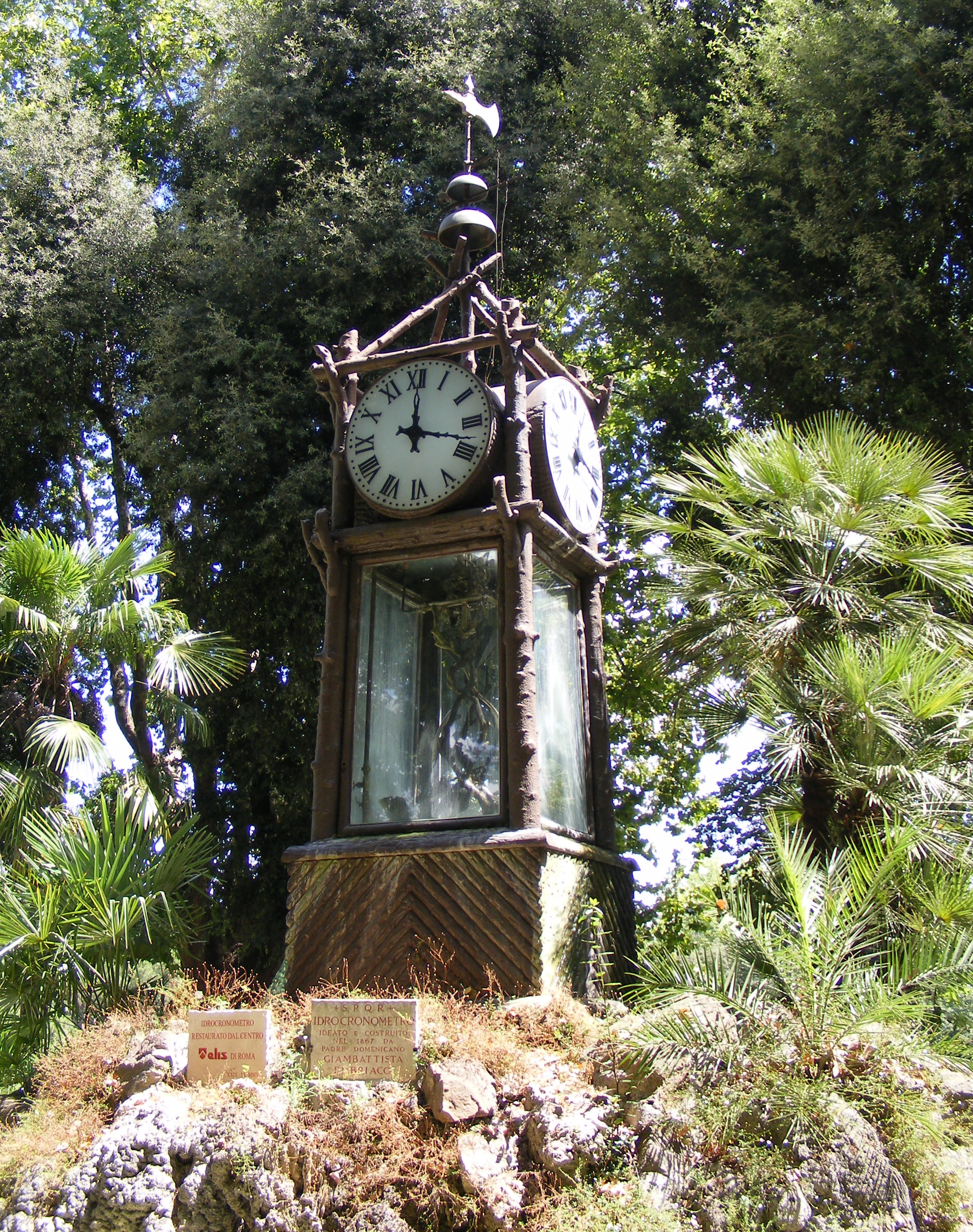
Embriaco's hydrochronometer in the Villa Borghese gardens

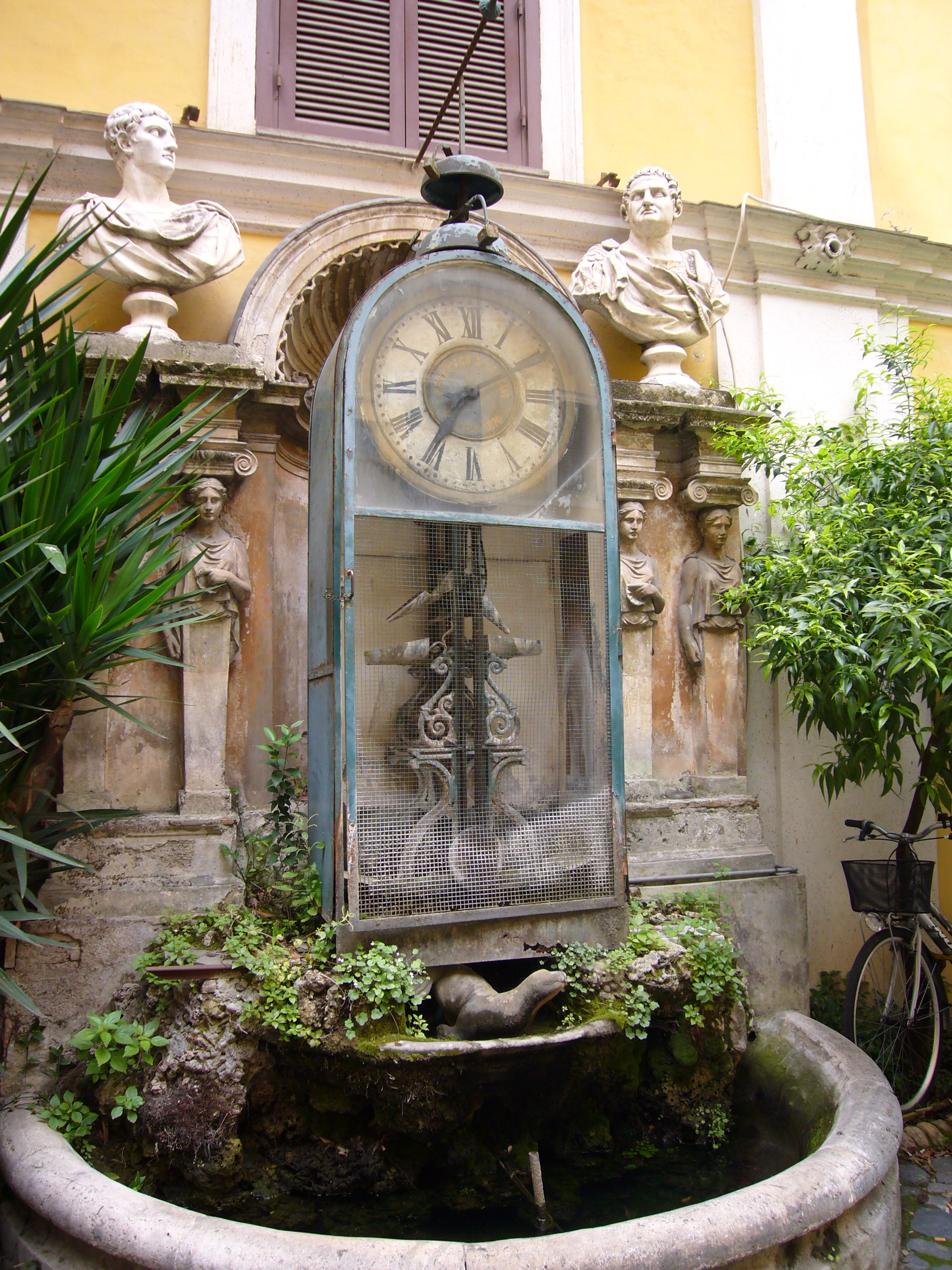
A hydrochronometer at Palazzo Berardi, Rome

A hydrochronometer is a kind of water clock.

In 1867 Fr. Giovan Battista Embriaco, O.P., inventor and professor of the College of St. Thomas in Rome, created a hydrochronometer and sent it to the Paris Universal Exposition of 1867, where it received many prizes. It had the shape of a wooden pinnacle made of cast iron fused as a tree trunk, while its four dials were visible from all directions.

In 1873, the water clock was returned to Rome and placed in Villa Borghese gardens into a fountain realized by the architect Gioacchino Ersoch. It is still there and works constantly.

In June 2007, after two years of restoration at ELIS School, it was restarted by the Town Mayor of Rome.

Another hydrochromometer can be found at Palazzo Berardi, rione Pigna, Rome.
