= Santi Vincenzo e Anastasio a Trevi =

- Saints Vincent and Anastasius at Trevi
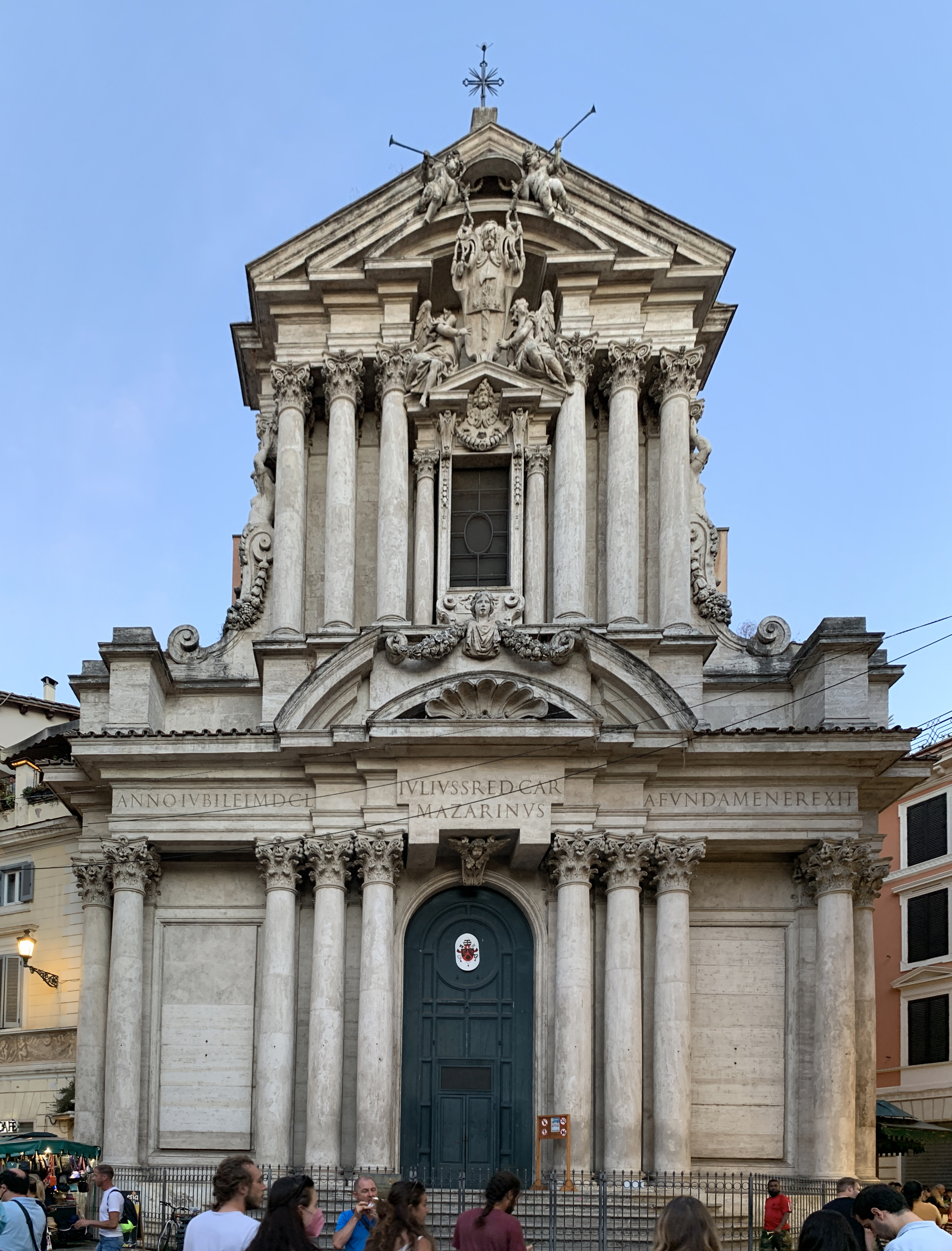
- Saints Vincent and Anastasius at Trevi Church
- Click on the map for a fullscreen view
- 41°54′03″N 12°29′02″E
- Location: Rome
- Country: Italy
- Denomination: Roman Catholic

Architecture
- Architect: Martino Longhi the Younger
- Architectural type: Church
- Style: Baroque
- Groundbreaking: 1646
- Completed: 1650

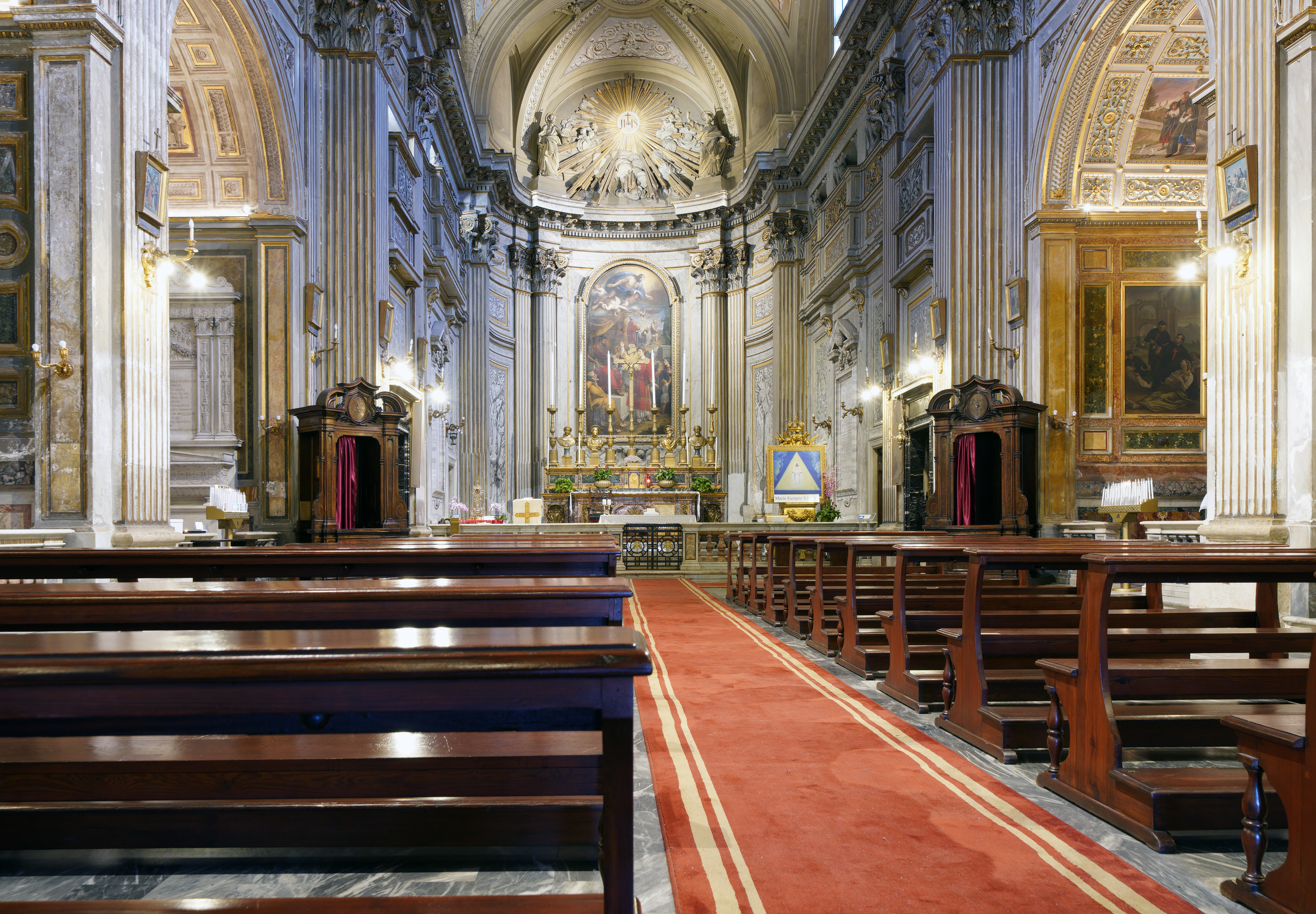
Interior.

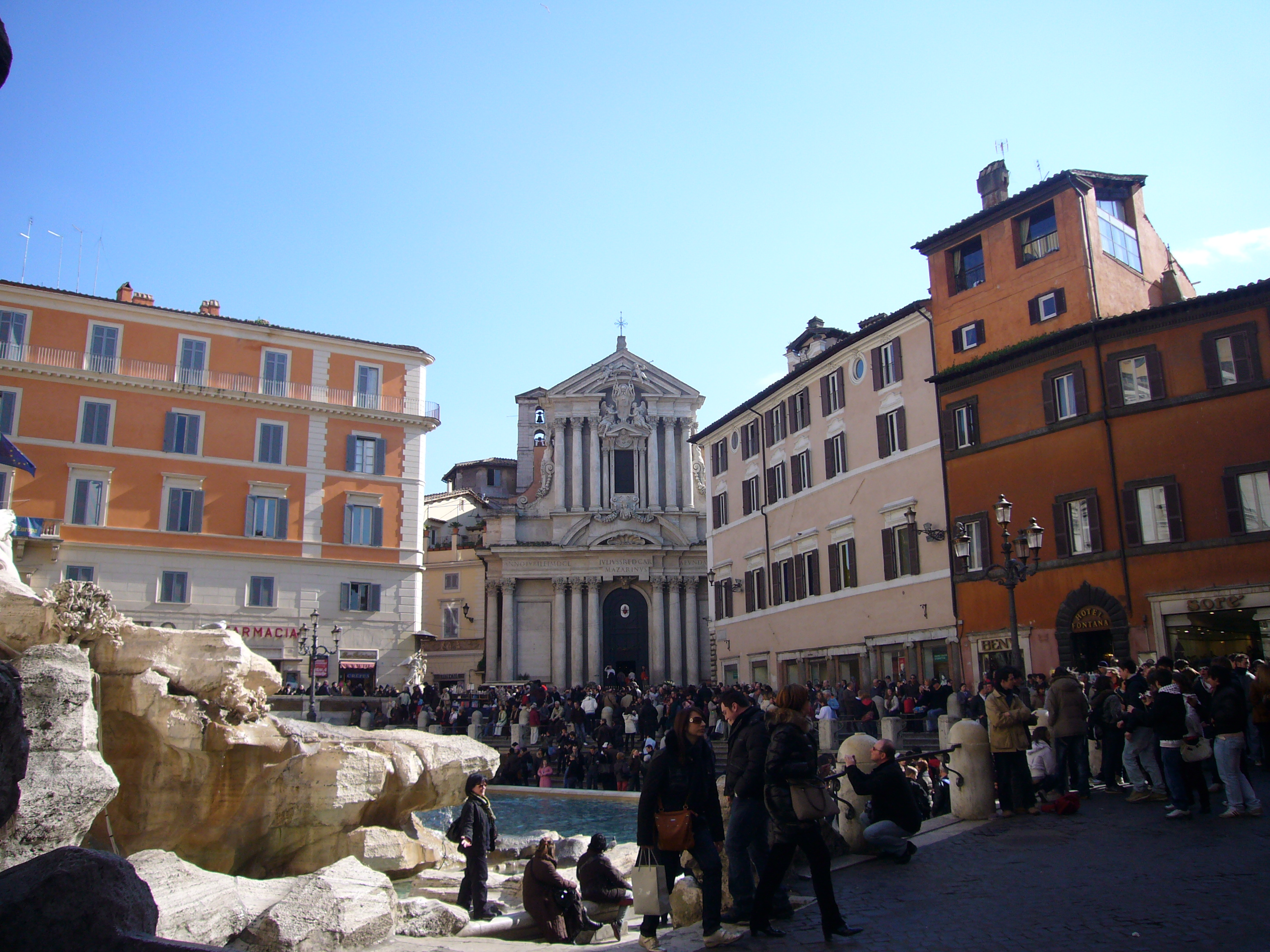
View of the church from the Trevi Fountain

Santi Vincenzo e Anastasio a Trevi ("Saints Vincent and Anastasius at Trevi") is a Baroque church in Rome, the capital of Italy. Built from 1646 to 1650 to the design of architect Martino Longhi the Younger and located in close proximity to the Trevi Fountain and the Quirinal Palace, for which it served as parish church, it is notable as the place where the precordia and embalmed hearts of 22 popes (from Sixtus V to Leo XIII) are preserved.

Santi Vincenzo e Anastasio a Trevi lies on the location of a medieval church, mentioned in 962 in a bull by Pope John XII as a branch of the San Silvestro in Capite basilica, as well as in 15th century records. Known as "Santi Vincenzo e Anastasio" since the 16th century, it was rebuilt in the Baroque style and completed in 1650. Two entablatures superimposed over the main one, all three with arched, angled or broken pediments, concentrate attention on the richly sculptural central bay of the façade's two storeys, in a theatrical composition "more curious than exemplary" that found few imitators. Its dense massing of Corinthian columns, ten in the lower order and six above make a total, with the columns flanking the finestrone of the upper tier, eighteen fully disengaged Corinthian columns, causing Roman wags to dub the façade il canneto, "the canebrake".

The church was reconstructed on the order of Cardinal Mazarin, whose triumphantly presented coat of arms and cardinal's hat, supported by angels, is the focus of the façade composition. It is rumored that Mazarin's niece, Marie Mancini, a mistress of Louis XIV of France, is also portrayed on the facade, in the central female mascaron. The sculptural portrayal of a laywoman and the support of the cardinal's ecclesiastical coat of arms by the sculptures of two barechested women make the church unique among churches in Rome.

Until the 1820s, Santi Vincenzo e Anastasio a Trevi was known as the "Pontifical Parish" (Parrocchia Pontificia). The church's interior features a single nave; the altar is decorated by the painting Martyrdom of Saints Vincent and Anastasius by Francesco Pascucci. Prolific Italian illustrator and engraver Bartolomeo Pinelli (1771–1835) was buried in Santi Vincenzo e Anastasio a Trevi, as was Russian princess Zinaida Volkonskaya.

Its travertine façade has proved porous; restoration with liquid hydraulic mortar and other materials was undertaken in 1989–90, to arrest deterioration.

== Sources ==
- C. Rendina, Le Chiese di Roma, Newton & Compton Editori, Milano 2000, p. 370–371.
- L. Pratesi, Rione II Trevi, in AA.VV, I rioni di Roma, Newton & Compton Editori, Milano 2000, Vol. I, pp. 131–201.
