= Mariya Volkonskaya =

Wife of Prince Sergey Volkonsky

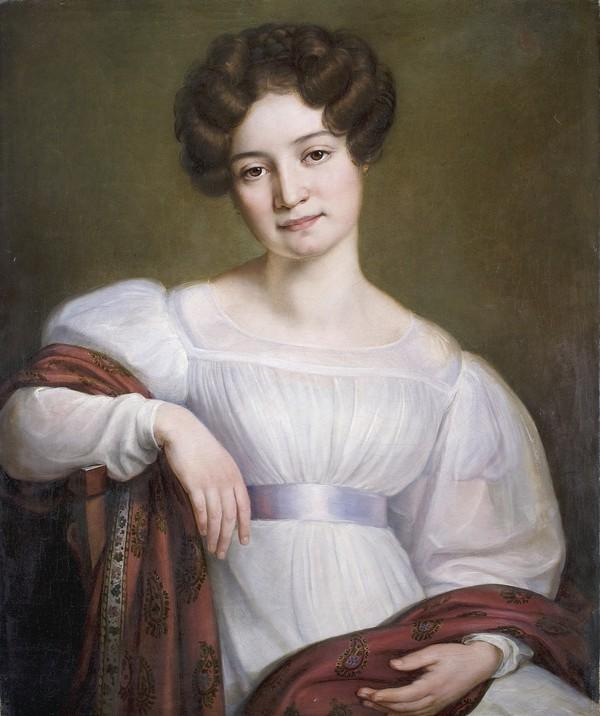
A portrait of Maria Nikolaevna Raevskaya (Mariya Volkonskaya) (by an unknown artist of the first half of the 19th century)

Princess Maria Nikolaevna Volkonskaya (née Raevskaya; Russian: Мария Николаевна Волконская (Раевская); December 25, 1805 – August 10, 1863) was a Decembrist wife of Prince Sergey Volkonsky who followed her husband into Siberian exile after his trial.

== Early life ==
=== Childhood ===
Mariya Volkonskaya was a Russian aristocrat and the youngest of five children to General Nikolai Raevsky and Sofia Raevskaya. She was born on her family's Ukrainian estate on December 25, 1804; however, the family often moved due to her father's military status. She grew up speaking mainly French, English, which she spoke perfectly, and German. Russian was the most difficult of her languages. Like many Russian aristocrats, Mariya was educated at home. She enjoyed reading books and was great at playing the piano and sang semi-professionally. Her favorite interests, though, were history and literature, according to a testimony of her son, Michael. Her father's work left him absent for much of Mariya's upbringing, along with her four siblings. Her mother, Sofia, was most present in her children's upbringing. Sofia had a temper and a petty character. Despite this, Maryia respected and loved her mother throughout her life, but the head of the family was always Nikolai, who his family always obeyed.

A relationship Mariya held with another man other than her husband was that of Alexander Pushkin. Born in 1799, Pushkin shared a relative closeness in age with Mariya and had a relationship with the family, spending months abroad with the Raevskys. The two are thought to have never been more than friends, although some believe he had strong feelings for her. The most notable was the relationship with Gustav Olizar, the leader of the nobility who frequently visited the Raevsky house. He proposed to Maryia, but the proposal was refused by her father. Although Nikolai decided everything for his daughter, it is unknown if the refusal came directly from Mariya or her father.

=== Marriage ===
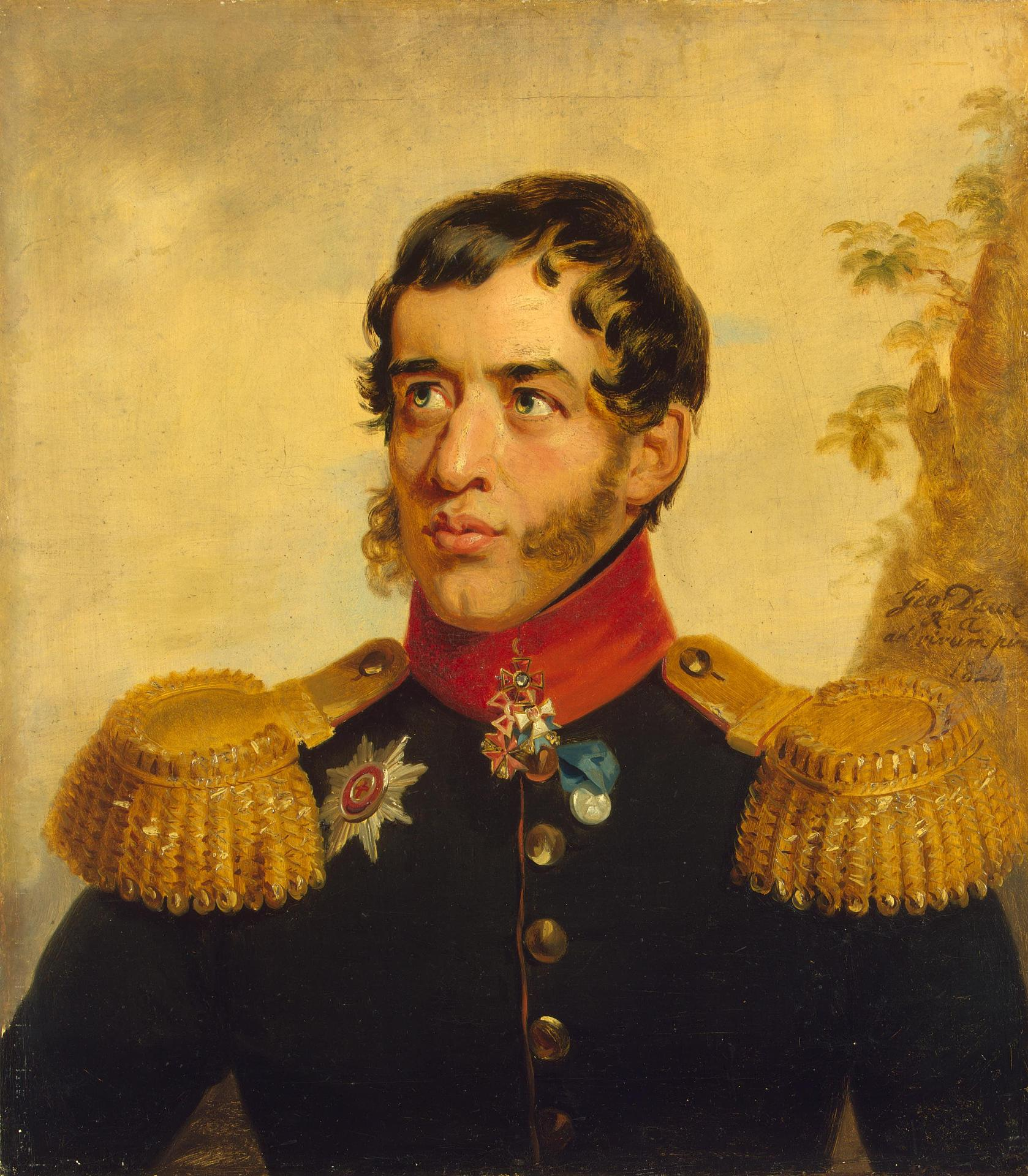
Sergey Volkonsky (1788—1865) Russian General, participant of Decembrist revolt, portrait by George Dawe

In 1824, Mariya married Prince Sergey Volkonsky. Volkonsky was an aristocratic Major General in the Russian Empire. The marriage between the two, in Mariya's words, was not true love, though she did feel some attraction for Sergei. Mariya's father was uneasy about the marriage between the two due to Sergei's "liberal" ideas. The two enjoyed a honeymoon in Gurzuf, Crimea. When they returned, Sergei returned to his army career and his life in the secret society. Although she had married into a noble, rich family, Mariya stated that she felt nervous about leaving home and her new life years after the marriage. She felt unhappy about the marriage and noted that she felt like she did not even know her new husband and was unaware of his secret dealings. Soon, Maryia became pregnant and, shortly after, became ill and went to visit her mother in Odessa, hoping the salty summer air would help. In the Fall, Mariya returned to Uman with her husband in the 9th division headquarters of Uman. Soon after their reunification, Volkonsky departed again, this time to Tulchin. Maryia had a hard time with the separation and wrote to him, often begging for his return. He returned suddenly to Uman, awakening his pregnant wife urgently. He confessed to the arrest of his closest conspirator, Pestel, without sharing details of the reason and immediately took Maryia to her family's Kiev estate. After dropping her off, Sergei left. Mariya delivered her son Nikolai on January 2, 1826, without Sergei. The birth was difficult, and her father dictated the situation even during Maryia's delivery. Maryia was ill for weeks postpartum; during this time, the Raesvkys hid her husband's arrest from her. When Maryia learned the details, she wrote to her husband with support, offering to share prison with him. Once she recovered from her sickness, Maryia and Nikolia went together to St. Petersburg to see Sergei. Nikolai was left with her father's aunt, who was a doctor.

== The Decembrist Revolt ==
=== Sergei Volkonsky's Arrest ===
Sergei's arrest was directly due to The Decembrist Revolt on December 14, 1825. The Decembrist uprising attempted to overthrow the Tsar government in Modern Russia and establish a constitutional monarchy. The sudden death of Alexander I sparked a military coup that stood thousands strong. The rebel forces ultimately fell to the loyalists due to a lack of coordination and the overwhelming firepower of the loyalist forces. Soon after the Decembrist Revolt, Volkonsky knew his time as a free man was limited. Sergei quickly returned to Uman in December 1825, rushing Maryia to her parents' estate in Kiev. After securing her safety, Sergei returned to St. Petersburg to await his fate.

Sergei did not reveal details of the arrest, but Mariya eventually became aware of his role in the Decembrist Revolt and followed her husband to St. Petersburg. Mariya's father and brother were sworn loyalists and promptly became privy to Sergei's involvement. They were both wary of letting Mariya communicate with Sergei considering he was now an enemy of the state. On her journey to St. Petersburg, Mariya had left her newborn son with Countess Branitskaya, her great-aunt. Mariya's entire family was worried about the new mother's health, citing the possible adverse physical and mental effects of Sergei's arrest on her. Sergei received a letter from Mariya's mother highlighting her concern for her daughter's health. His new mission now was getting his wife and child reunited. The power was now in Mariya's father and brother's hands as they devised a plan to reunite the mother and child. They ultimately agreed to let Mariya see her husband only if she decided to return to her child.

Mariya picked up her child and waited for the decision on her husband's fate. She waited for months, worried about her family's future. She was relieved at the news that her husband's life would be spared but that he would live in exile.

== Life in Exile ==
=== Journey to Siberia ===
The surviving Decembrists were sent to Siberia to work as slaves for the government. Mariya was aware of her husband's fate and, like many others, vowed to be there by his side. "I shared joy with him, I must share prison also..." Mariya's motive for joining her husband in Siberia was not only due to spousal motives but also religion. "And I loved him like Christ...in his prisoners clothing. A crown of thorns above his head." Like the other Decembrist Wives, Mariya needed to receive permission from not only her family but also the Tsar. She petitioned the Tsar and was ultimately approved for travel. Her family forbade her to follow him to Siberia, and the Volkonsky family remained under the radar as the son had become an enemy of the state. Upon her arrival in St. Petersburg, Mariya met with her father; he had come to mourn the fate of his son-in-law and ultimately accepted his daughter's appeal to follow her husband; in exchange, Mariya would leave her son with him. Before her departure to Siberia, Mariya also had dinner with her father-in-law P.M. Volkonsky. The following day would be her last in St. Petersburg. She spent time with her son and her mother-in-law.

Continuing her journey to Siberia, Mariya stopped in Moscow for two days. There she spent time with her cousin, Zenaida Volkonskaya who had a "close friendship" with Alexander I and was known for her writing skills. Zenaida helped Mariya prepare for her trip and bid her a final fair well party filled with entertainment to make, what was possibly her last time in Moscow, a notable one. Mariya received many documents and packages from relatives of the Decembrist Revolt participants during her time in Moscow including things like medicine, clothing, and letters to loved ones.

=== Travels throughout Siberia ===
Mariya left Moscow and arrived in Irkutsk on the night of January 21, 1827. Upon her arrival, General Friedrich Zeidler had not even let her unpack before attempting to discourage the continuation of her journey. Here she was prompted to renounce her title and agree to the same terms that her husband had agreed to, along with other clauses. These agreements essentially made the Decembrists and their families peasants of the state. After signing the document which outlined her and her family's new freedoms, Mariya left the last developed area she would see for years to come.

==== Blagodatsk (Nerchinsk) ====
On February 11, 1827, she arrived at the Blagodatsk mine. Before she could see Sergei, Mariya had to show her travel papers to the commandant of the mine. She was also proposed a new set of agreements to sign, outlining her permissions to see "her Sergei." The next day, Mariya was met by two guards who escorted her to the mine to see her husband who had been working forced labor in shackles. The working conditions were described as a nightmare, and her husband's state shocked Mariya. Although Mariya's living conditions in Blagodatsk were not as bad as her husband's, it was a peasant hut which was not what she had been accustomed to her whole life. Volkonskaya did have a maid, which helped her on their journey to Sergei, but once they arrived, her maid's actions became stubborn, and she showed no respect to Mariya. She would not do anything to help Mariya. Eventually, they ordered her maid to be sent back to Russia, leaving her alone for the first time.

The conditions surrounding communication between the prisoners and the outside world, including the wives present, were set by officials and enforced by guards. Contact between Mariya and the outside world had no restrictions, allowing her to write family members of other Decembrist prisoners and request supplies on their behalf. Mariya still helped the overall morale of her husband, and other prisoners noted that her arrival saved his life. Mariya eventually became aware that the chances of her being able to return home to her son would be impossible, not because she was restricted from moving by officials but to her realization that her husband would most likely not make it without her.

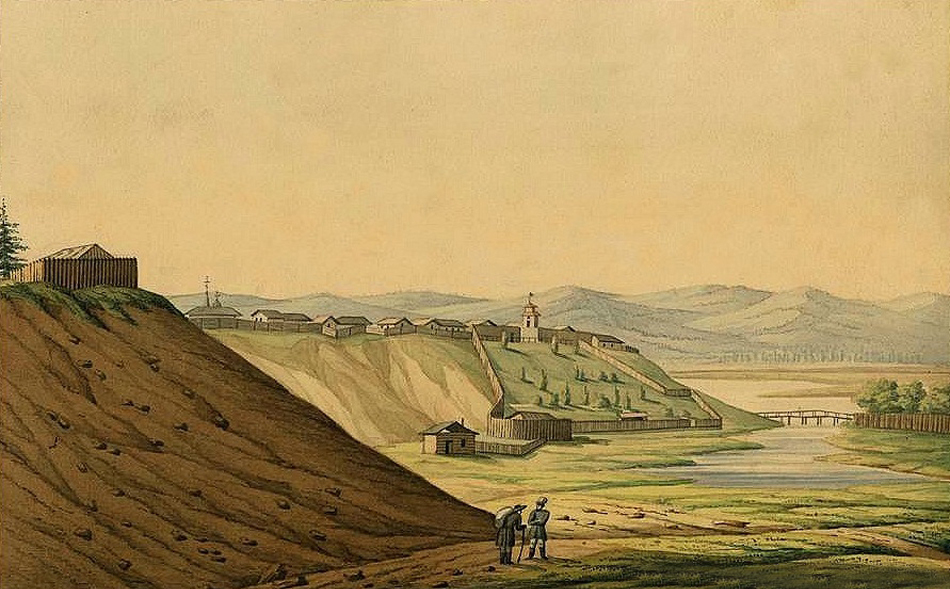
View of Chita taken from under the mountain. Watercolor by the Decembrist artist Nikolai Alexandrovich Bestuzhev. (1791-1855). The period of writing is 1827-1830. Place of creation - Chita Ostrog, Trans-Baikal Territory

==== Chita Prison ====
The Decembrists moved to a new prison in Chita in the Summer of 1827. Chita was a sort of staging area for the Decembrists, who were ordered to leave Blagodatsk due to insufficient living space. Mariya and other wives also relocated to remain close to their captive partners. Regular visits remained normal for Mariya and Sergei following their arrival. Permission to live in the same quarters as their wives was granted by Nicholas I in 1829, a little over a year after the news of her son's death, which she could not bear to inform Sergei about. In 1830, the two gave birth to another child, a girl named Sophia. Sophia died on the same day she was born. This made Mariya especially sensitive to the vast loneliness and downtime in the Chita prison. The Decembrists and their wives stayed in the town of Chita for almost three years before their departure to Nerchinsk.

==== Petrovsky Factory Prison (Nerchinsk) ====
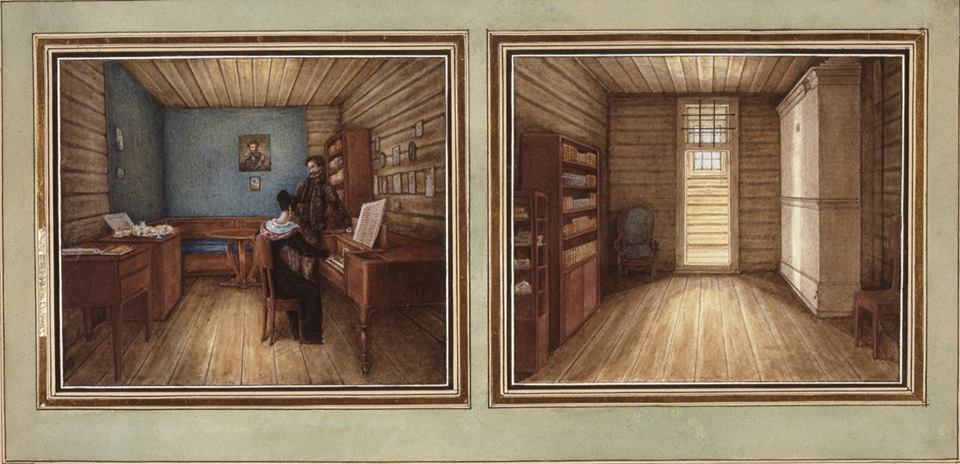
Volkonsky's cell at Petrovskiy zavod

The Petrovsky factory was a prison for the Decembrists in Nerchinsk Mining District. The prisoners were first moved to the Petrovsky factory in the Summer of 1830. The conditions of the new prison were quite different than before. "As we approached Petrovsk, I saw an immense building with a red roof in the form of a horseshoe. There was not a window to be seen." For Mariya and the other wives, certain quarters in the prison could fit couples inside. One of the wives had built a house close to the prison grounds; Mariya had kept most of her belongings there and moved into these quarters with Sergei. Mariya could not stand living in the confinement of a prison, and the coming winter exacerbated the rough living. In a relatively short time after her arrival, Mariya had a house built close by; she had a maid and cook there but returned to her husband's cell every night to sleep with him.

During their time in the Nerchinsk, Mariya and Sergei birthed another son, Mikhail (March 10, 1832), and a little over two years later, a daughter, Elena (September 28, 1834). Shortly after the birth of his two new children, in June 1835, Volkonsky was released from a life of factory work. Volkonsky was approved to settle in a small village in the Irkutsk region and moved close to Urik in the Fall of 1837. Their departure was postponed for almost a year due to his health reasons.

Upon her arrival to Urik, Mariya was particularly interested in getting a good education for their children. She feared that being raised in Siberia would take a toll on the characters of her children, Misha and Elena. Mariya noted that they adopted the local dialect of Urik, an unfavorable trait for an aristocratic family. Mariya's concerns were that the children were becoming "little savages" and demanded they speak French when at home. For the whole family, as more Decembrists settled in Urik, the children benefited from private tutors in all important areas, such as mathematics and linguistics. This was a turning point for Mariya, who had now set her sights on Irkutsk.

=== Return to Irkutsk ===
Mariya decided to leave Urik and, in 1844, was granted the right to move to the city of Irkutsk along with her two children; the family kept the Urik home as a summer getaway. Mariya made a new life for herself while living in Irkutsk. She participated in many social events and became the center of social life in the city. She opened a children's hospital and several schools and hosted many social events in their spacious home in the city center. Despite their favorability among most in the city, the provincial power in Irkutsk had no power over the Russian government's classification of the Volkonsky's. They remained state criminals in the eyes of the law, but her overwhelming favorability and influence enabled Mariya to live a life similar to that in St. Petersburg or Kiev. Mariya's daughter Elena Volkonsky Married Dmitri Vasilevich Molchanov, a graduate of the University of Kazan and a new official in Siberia. Mariya had reservations about the relationship only due to the couple's age difference. On the other hand, Sergei was unwelcoming of the man and thought he was "shifty." Soon after their marriage, the Molchanovs moved from Irkutsk to St. Petersburg due to orders from the government. The moment of her daughter's departure was bittersweet.

=== Russian Reintegration ===
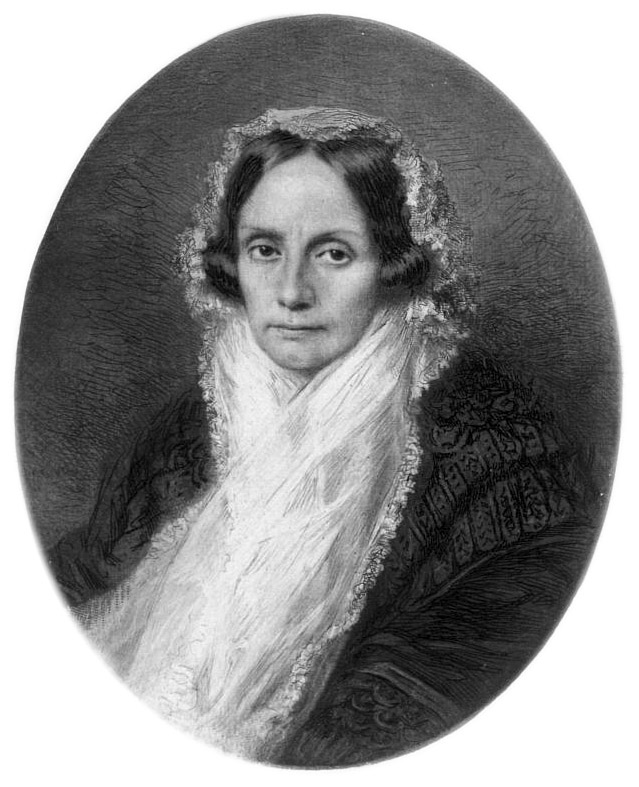
Princess Maria Volkonskaya. Engraving by V. Unger from the posthumous portrait of N. Gordigiani

Following her daughter's move to St. Petersburg, Mariya had not been well and suffered from various illnesses. When Alexander II took the throne in 1855, Elena Molchanov requested that her mother be allowed back into Russia to treat her condition. Her petition was granted in 1855, and Mariya settled back in Moscow for the first time in decades. In September 1856, Sergei Volkonsky received permission to leave Siberia, joined by his son. The trip to Moscow was slow due to Sergei's poor condition. reuniting with his ill wife in October of that year.

After the death of Elena's husband in 1857, the family went abroad to different places in Europe like Rome and Paris. Elena remarried Nikolai Kochubey in 1859, and her son married in Geneva the same year. This would be Maria's first trip out of Russia. The two were both too ill to leave their home upon their return. Mariya, who resettled in Voronkii, died on August 10, 1863. Sergei Volkonsky was bedridden in Estonia, upset that he never got to say goodbye to his wife. Sergei Volkonsky died on December 10, 1865, also in Voronki.

== Legacy ==
Alexander Pushkin's Eugene Onegin and Nikolay Nekrasov's poem Russian Women, were dedicated to Volkonskaya.

Consisting of two separate manors in the center of Irkutsk city, Trubetskoy Manor and Volkonsky Manor are memorials dedicated to the two Decembrist families who left lasting changes in the city. Volkonsky Manor is regarded as a "unique phenomenon in cultural Irkutsk." Inside the memorial includes a recreated interior of the Volkonsky home using original pieces of furniture and musical instruments.
