= Zinaida Volkonskaya =

Russian writer, poet, singer, salonist (1792–1862)

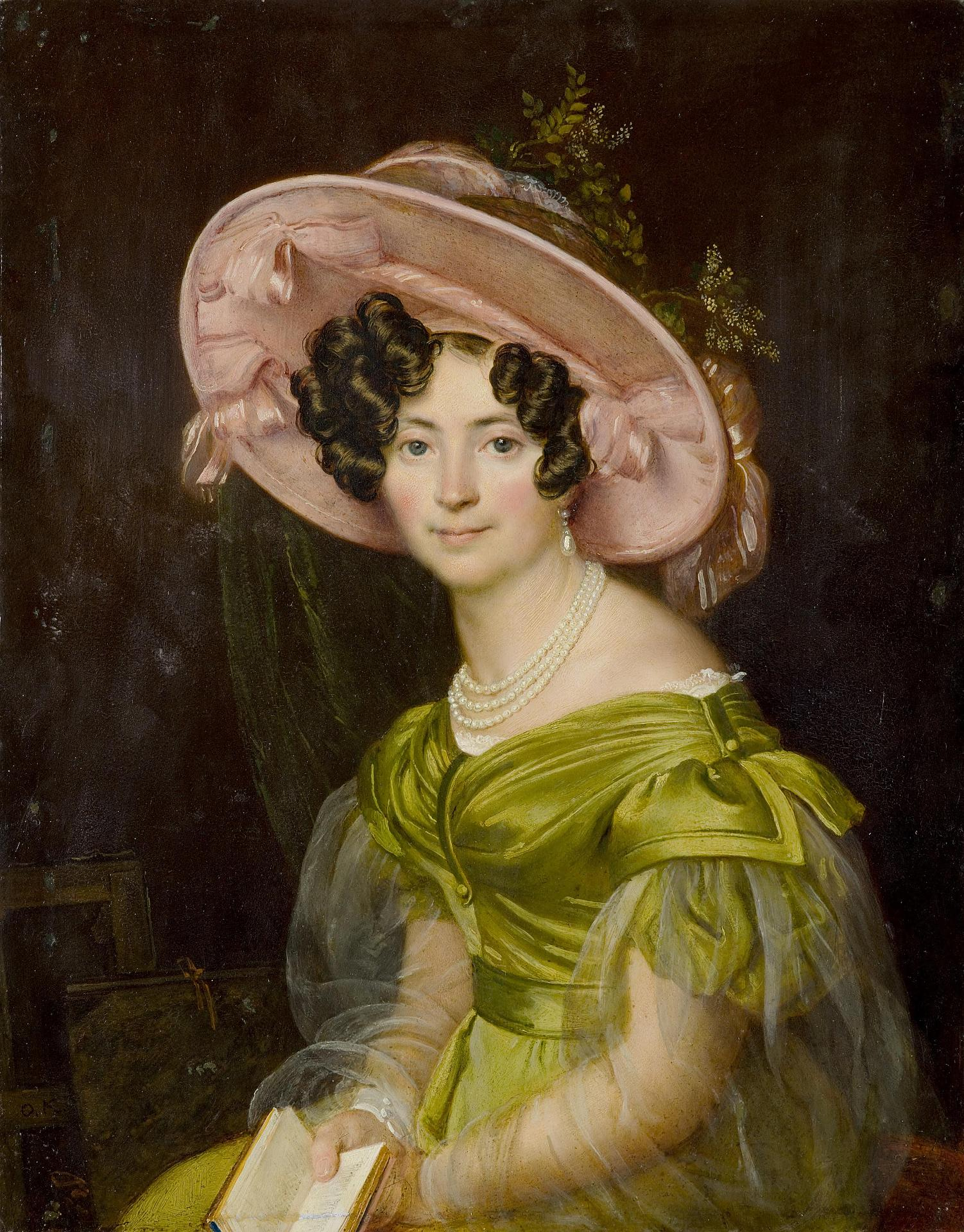
- Portrait by Orest Kiprensky, c. 1830
- Born: Zinaida Alexandrovna Beloselskaya; 14 December [O.S. 3 December] 1792; Dresden, Saxony, Holy Roman Empire
- Died: 5 February [O.S. 24 January] 1862; Rome
- Noble family: Belosselsky-Belozersky
- Spouse: Nikita Volkonsky
- Issue: Alexander Volkonsky
- Father: Prince Alexander Beloselsky-Belozersky
- Mother: Varvara Yakovlevna Tatishcheva

Princess Zinaida Aleksandrovna Volkonskaya née Beloselskaya (Russian: Зинаида Александровна Волконская; 14 December [O.S. 3 December] 1792 – 5 February [O.S. 24 January] 1862), was a Russian writer, poet, singer, composer, salonist and lady-in-waiting. She was an important figure in 19th-century Russian cultural life. She performed in Paris and London as an amateur opera singer.

== Biography ==
Zinaida was born in Dresden to the family of a Russian ambassador, Prince Alexander Beloselsky-Belozersky, and descended in the male line from the medieval rulers of Belozersk. Her mother was a Tatischev, also of Rurikid ancestry.

Zinaida was lady-in-waiting to Queen Louise of Prussia in 1808 and was close to Emperor Alexander I of Russia, who became her lifelong correspondent and, possibly, lover. To stem gossip, Zinaida married Alexander's aide-de-camp, Prince Nikita Volkonsky, in 1810. They were prominent during the Congresses of Vienna and Verona.

Volkonskaya was greatly skilled in the arts, and was known as a musician, poet, composer, and singer (specifically as a contralto). She wrote her own pieces, including an opera entitled Joan of Arc, and studied with renowned composers such as Boiledieu, while hosting musical salons and developing friendships with eminent figures such as Rossini.

She moved to Russia in 1817, and to Moscow in 1822. In the 1820s the "Corinna of the North" hosted a literary and musical salon on Tverskaya Street in Moscow, in a mansion later rebuilt into the Yeliseyev food store. Adam Mickiewicz, Yevgeny Baratynsky, Dmitry Venevitinov, and Alexander Pushkin frequented her house. Pushkin's verse epistle to her, "The queen of music and beauty", is well known.

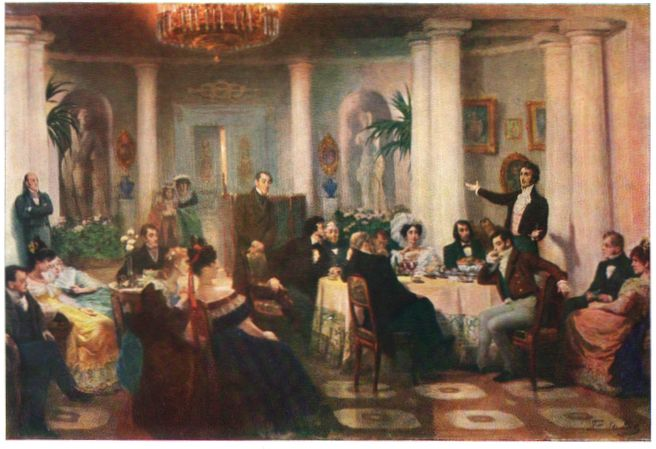
Zinaida's salon in Moscow, as painted by Grigoriy Myasoyedov

After Alexander I's death her brother-in-law Sergey Volkonsky led the Decembrist Revolt against his successor Nicholas. The Decembrists were exiled to Siberia, and their wives decided to follow them. Zinaida threw a farewell party for these women, incurring the displeasure of Nicholas I. She also came under suspicion as a secret convert to Catholicism from Russian Orthodoxy and possible Jesuit agent.

These pressures led to Zinaida's moving to Rome in 1829. She was accompanied by her son and Stepan Shevyrev, the son's tutor. Among her lodgings in Rome were Palazzo Poli, Villa Wolkonsky, and a smaller house in the Via degli Avignonesi. Her salon was frequented by Karl Brullov, Alexander Ivanov, Bertel Thorvaldsen, Vincenzo Camuccini, Stendhal, and Sir Walter Scott. Nikolai Gogol wrote much of Dead Souls at her villa.

Princess Volkonskaya died of pneumonia (apparently after giving her warm cloak to an old street woman) and was buried at Santi Vincenzo e Anastasio a Trevi . An English-language biography by Maria Fairweather, Pilgrim Princess: A life of Princess Zinaida Volkonsky, made its appearance in 1998.

== English translations ==
- The Dream: A Letter, (story), from An Anthology of Russian Women's Writing, 1777–1992, Oxford, 1994. ISBN 0-19-871505-6

== Sources ==
- "Волконская, Зинаида Александровна" . Brockhaus and Efron Encyclopedic Dictionary (in Russian). 1906.
