= Villa Wolkonsky =

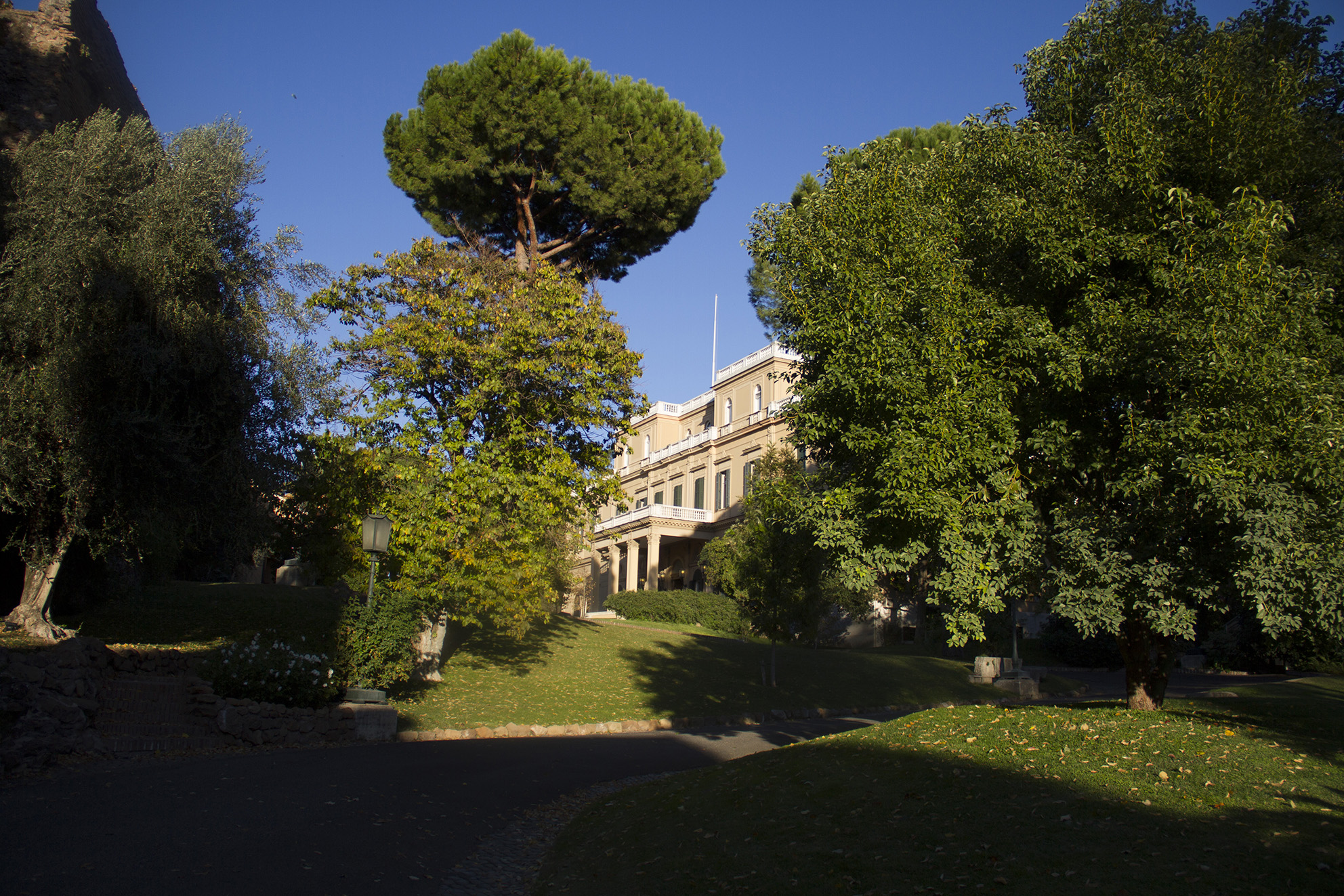
- View of the villa from the garden
- Click on the map for a fullscreen view

General information
- Location: Rome, Via Ludovico di Savoia, 00185 Roma RM, Italy
- Coordinates: 41°53′16″N 12°30′33″E
- Construction started: 1830s
- Owner: HM Government

Design and construction
- Architect: Giovanni Azzurri

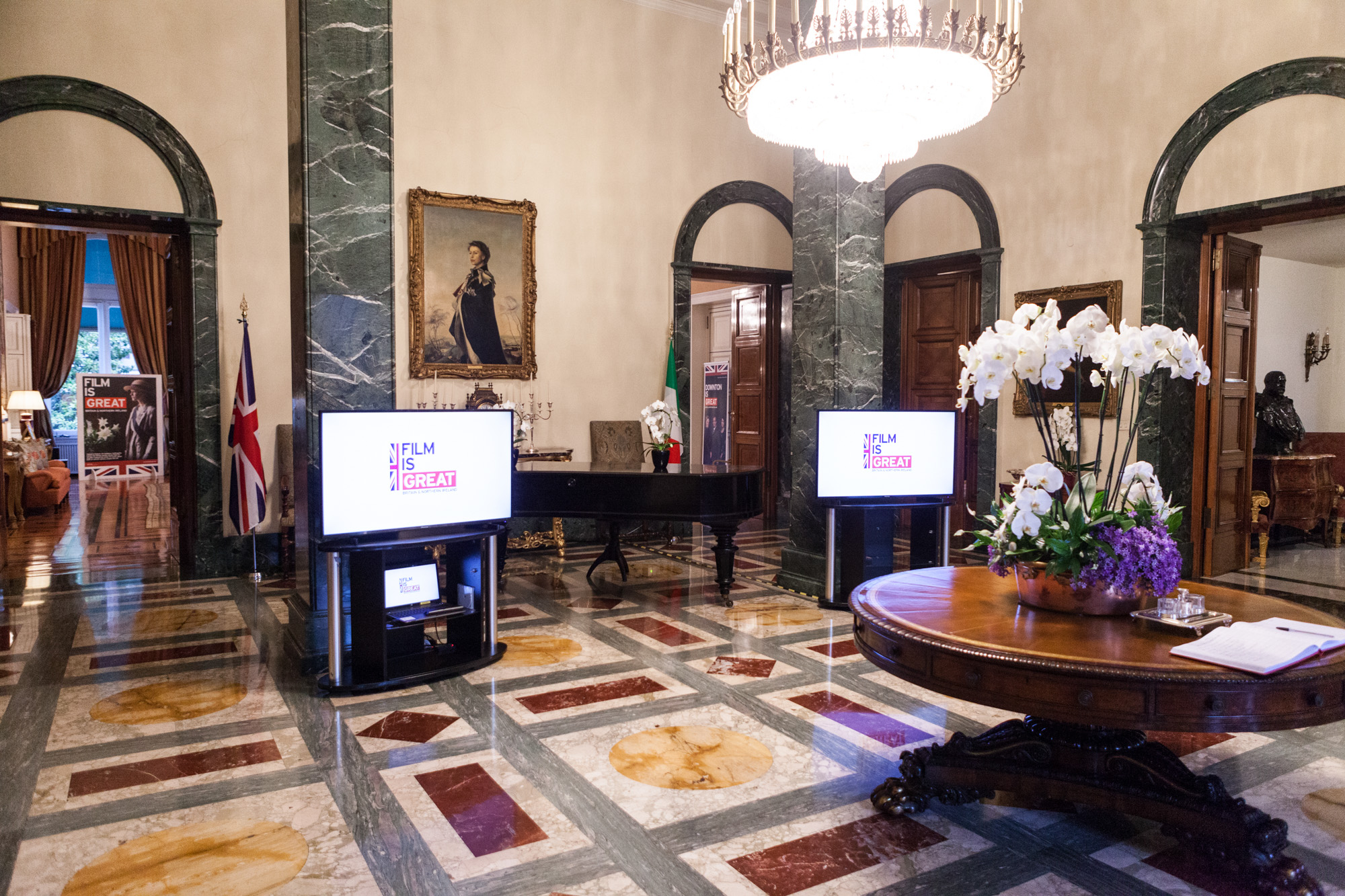
Interior view

Villa Wolkonsky (in Italian, the word villa usually includes not only a large building but also its grounds) is the official residence of the British ambassador to Italy in Rome. The entrance to the villa is located at 4, Via Ludovico di Savoia.

== History ==
The villa was originally owned by a Russian princess, Zenaǐde Wolkonsky (born Zenaǐde Alexandrovna Belosselsky-Belozersky), who made her home there in the 1830s. Her salon was frequented by Karl Brullov, Alexander Ivanov, Bertel Thorvaldsen, Gaetano Donizetti, Stendhal, and Sir Walter Scott. Nikolai Gogol wrote much of Dead Souls at the villa. Subsequently, it passed through various owners until it was sold to the German government in 1920, becoming the German embassy and ambassador's residence.

After the Liberation of Rome in 1944, the Italian government sequestrated the property, and it was placed under the Allied Control Commission. For a short time, it was occupied by the Swiss legation and then the Italian Red Cross. When the British Embassy at Rome's Porta Pia was blown up by members of the clandestine Zionist terrorist group Irgun on 31 October 1946, the Italian government made Villa Wolkonsky available to the British government to use as a temporary embassy and residence. The United Kingdom purchased the villa in 1951.

When the new British Embassy was reopened at its original location in 1971, the offices moved back to Porta Pia, and the villa reverted to its role as His Majesty's Ambassador's Residence. On the same grounds are outbuildings containing apartments for senior embassy officials.

The villa itself is frequently used for seminars and workshops, and it is also rented out to appropriate academic or commercial organisations for major events. The extensive grounds are also the venue for the annual King's Official Birthday Party. They are the jewel of the villa, still containing many features originally introduced by Princess Wolkonsky. A recent tree and plant census listed around 200 different species.
