= Sergey Volkonsky =

Russian major general and Decembrist (1788–1865)

Prince Sergei Volkonsky
- Сергей Волконский
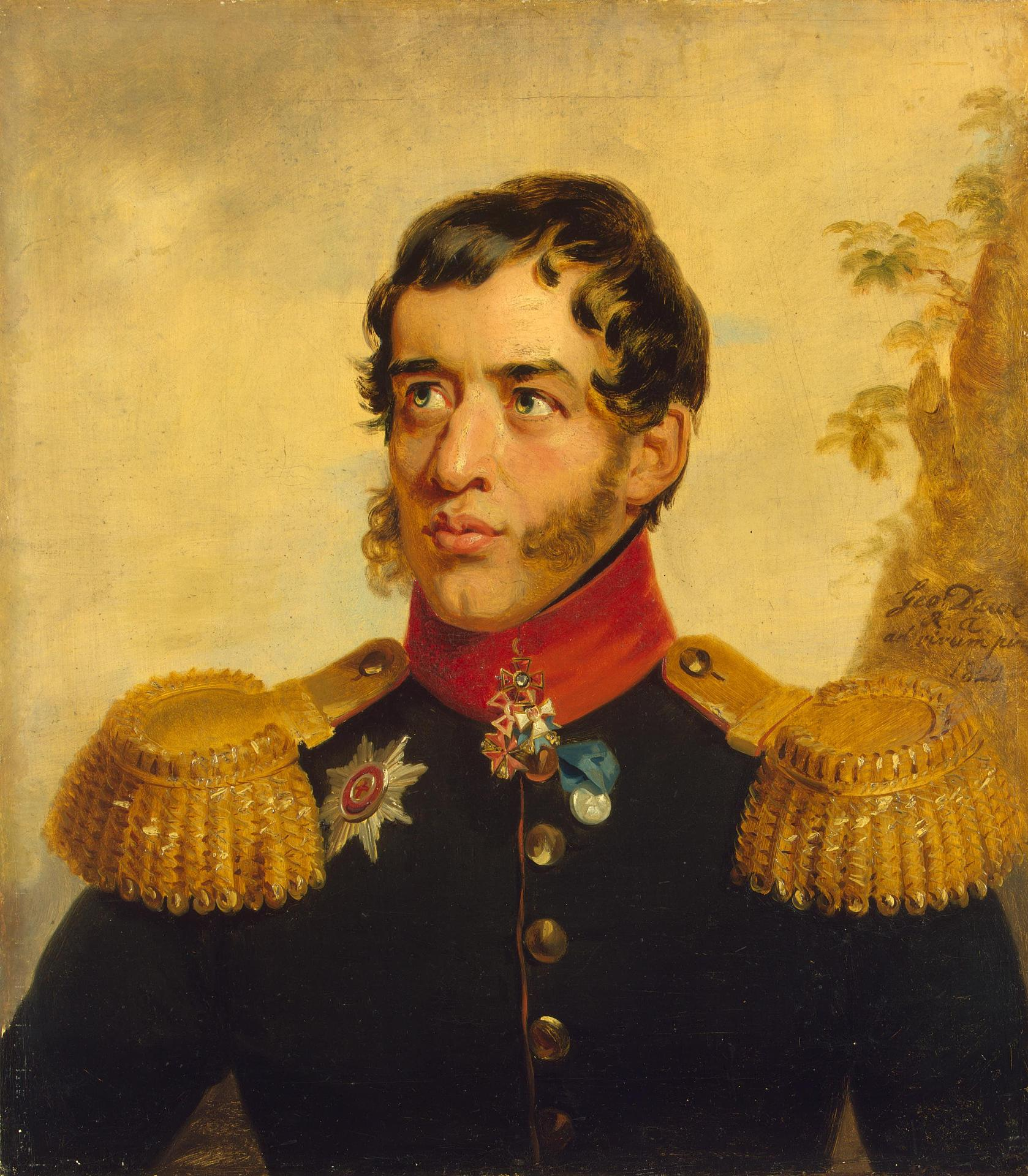
- Portrait by George Dawe, c. 1823–1825
- Born: 19 December 1788; Moscow, Moscow Governorate, Russian Empire
- Died: 10 December 1865 (aged 76); Voronki, Starodubsky District, Russian Empire
- Movement: Decemberist
- Spouse: Maria Rayevskaya

Prince Sergey Grigoryevich Volkonsky (Russian: Серге́й Григо́рьевич Волко́нский; 19 December [O.S. 8 December] 1788 – 10 December [O.S. 28 November] 1865) was a Russian major general and Decembrist from the aristocratic Volkonsky family.

== Life ==
Sergey Volkonsky was a grandson of Field Marshal Nicholas Repnin, a leading statesman of Catherine the Great's reign. The three brothers Sergey, Nikita Volkonsky and Nikolai Repnin-Volkonsky, distinguished themselves during the Napoleonic Wars. Princess Zenaǐde Wolkonsky was his sister-in-law. Serge Wolkonsky, a theatre director and critic, descended from his son Michail.

Volkonsky was promoted Major General after the Battle of Großbeeren and Battle of Dennewitz. He was wounded in the Battle of Eylau. He was the only general still in active service who took part in the Decembrist conspiracy of 1825, an attempt to achieve liberal reform by preventing the accession of Tsar Nicholas I. Following the failure of the revolt, he was found guilty and sentenced to beheading, which was eventually commuted to life in prison.

Prince Volkonsky went to toil in the mines near Irkutsk and spent 30 years as a political exile in Siberia. His wife, Maria Rayevskaya, followed him to Siberia. Their tribulations and hardships have been seen, in a later Russian tradition, as the stuff of high Romantic legend. Nikolay Nekrasov described them in a long poem. Oleg Strizhenov played the part of Volkonsky in the 1975 Soviet film The Captivating Star of Happiness.

On succeeding to the throne in 1856, Alexander II allowed Volkonsky and other old Decembrists to return from Siberia. In the late 1850s, Sergey Volkonsky travelled in Europe, where he met Alexander Herzen and other young liberals. Sergey and Maria spent the rest of their lives in the village of Voronki (Little Russia), which was owned by their daughter. The memoirs of Sergey Volkonsky were published in 1902.

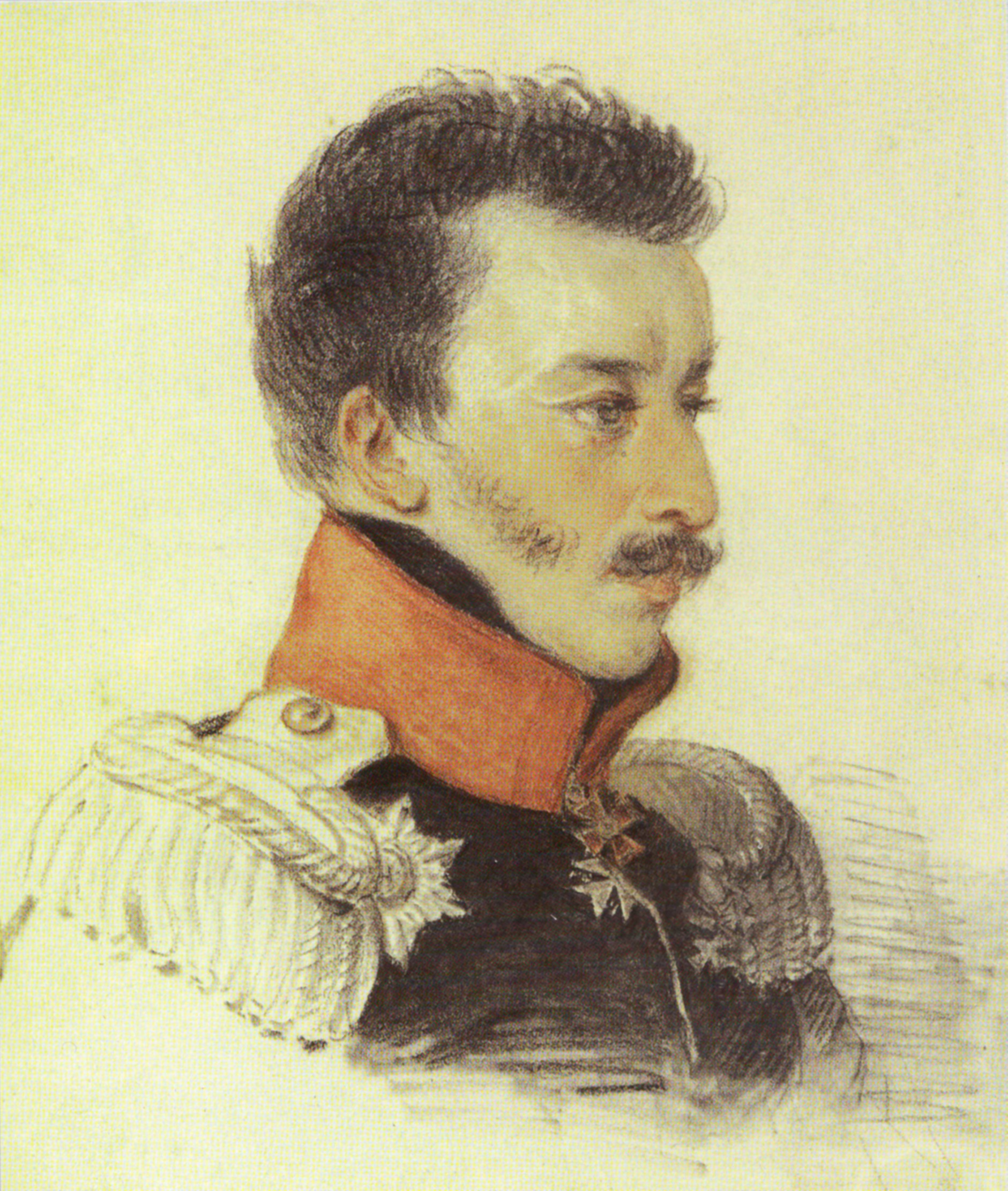
Pyotr Sokolov. Portrait of Sergey Volkonsky

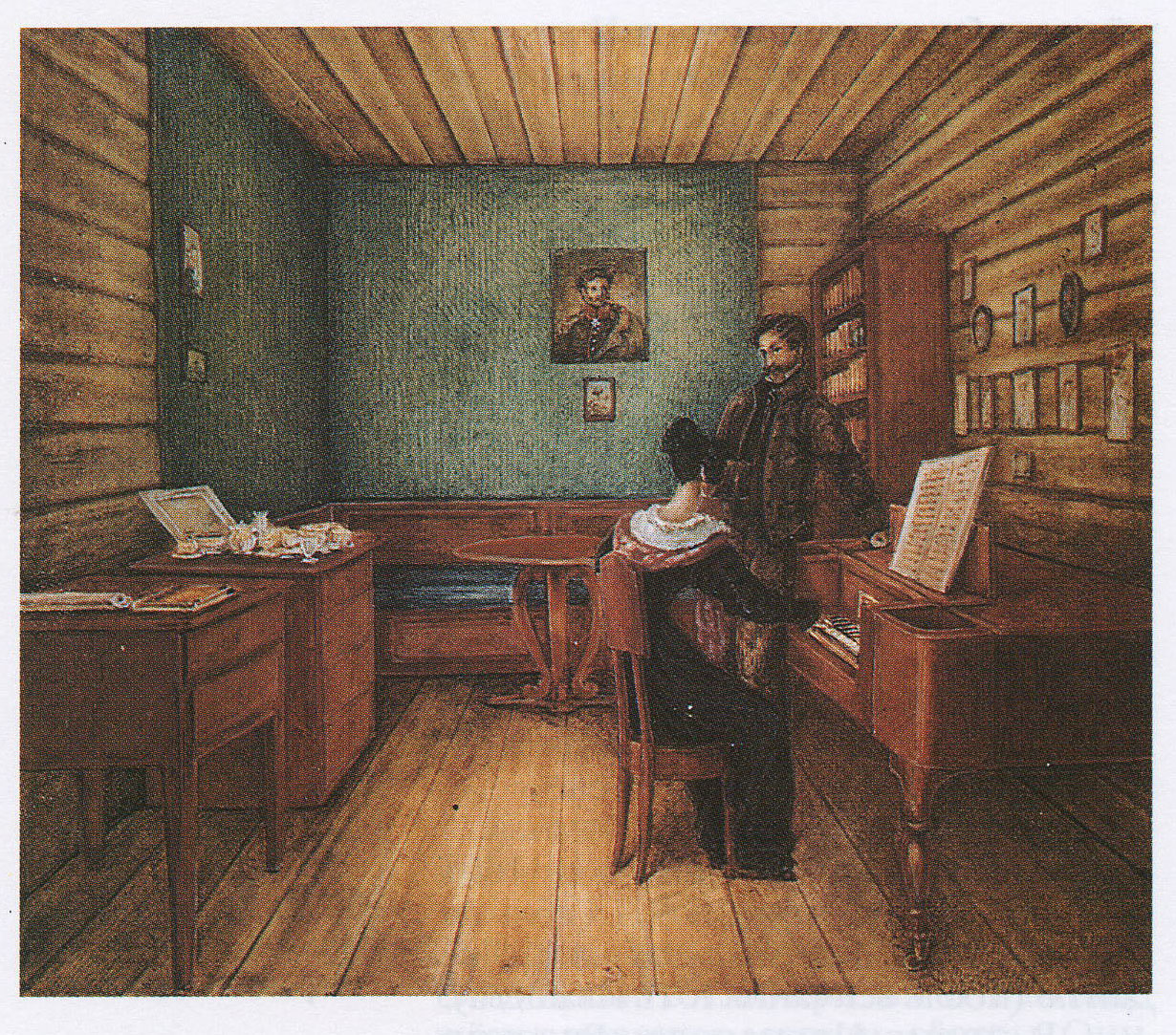
Nikolay Bestuzhev. Volkonsky S. G. with his wife in Petrovsky prison (1830)
