= Volkonsky =

House of Volkosky, princely family

Coat of arms of the Princes Volkonsky

The House of Volkonsky, also spelled Volkonski or Wolkonsky and later times Wlodkowski is an ancient Russian princely family, part of the Russian nobility.

== History ==
The family claims descent from the Rurik dynasty, in particular from the Princes of Chernigov. It was named after the Volkona river, south of Moscow. Members of the family held the title of Prince in the Russian Empire.

== Notable members ==
- Alexander Volkonsky (1866–1934), Russian diplomat
- Alexey Volkonsky (born 1978), Russian canoer
- Andrei Volkonsky (1933–2008), Russian composer
- Grigory Konstantinovich Volkonsky (cca. 1560 — 1634), prince, okolnichy and voivode, who repelled the Polish attack on Moscow in 1618.
- Grigory Ivanovich Volkonsky (1670-1715 or 1718), Russian statesman, chief commandant of Tula and Yaroslavl, one of the first 9 senators.
- Grigory Semyonovich Volkonsky (1721) (cca. 1673 — 1721), Russian military leader, major general, participant in the Northern War.
- Grigory Grigoryevich Volkonsky (1691-1758), prince, colonel, Simbirsk governor.
- Grigory Semyonovich Volkonsky (1742-1824), Russian military leader, cavalry general.
- Grigory Petrovich Volkonsky (1808-1882) knyaz, Russian diplomat, actual state councilor, chamberlain
- Maria Mikhailovich Volkonskaya (1863–1943), Russian aristocrat
- Maria Volkonsky (1805–1863), Russian aristocrat
- Nikita Volkonsky (1781–1844), Russian general
- Peeter Volkonski (born 1954), Estonian musician
- Peter Volkonsky (1861–1948), Russian aristocrat
- Pyotr Mikhailovich Volkonsky (1776–1852), Russian general
- Serge Wolkonsky (1860–1937), Russian theatre director
- Sergei Volkonsky (1788–1865), Russian general
- Zinaida Volkonskaya (1792–1862), Russian writer
