= Helvi =

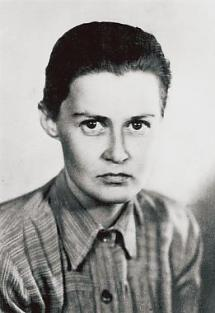
Finnish poet Helvi Juvonen

Helvi is a Finnish and Estonian feminine given name.

== People ==
- Helvi Hämäläinen (1901–1998), Finnish author
- Helvi Jürisson (1928–2023), Estonian writer
- Helvi Juvonen (1919–1959), Finnish writer
- Helvi Leiviskä (1902–1982), Finnish composer, writer, music educator and librarian
- Helvi Mustonen (b. 1947), Finnish artist
- Helvi Poutasuo (1943–2017), Finnish teacher, translator, editor, politician
- Helvi Sipilä (1915–2009), Finnish diplomat

== Ships ==
- SS Helvi a Finnish cargo ship
