= Maria Mikhailovich Volkonskaya =

Russian princess (1863–1943)

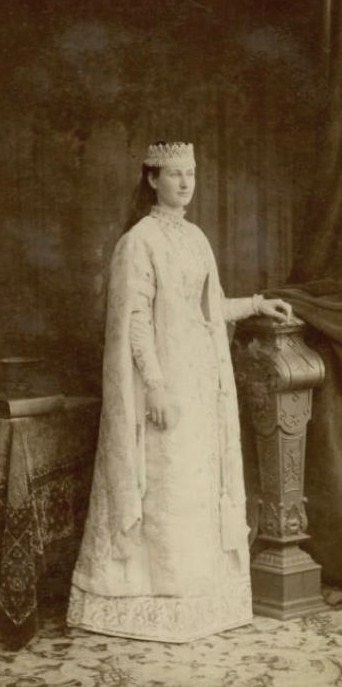
A photo of Maria Mikhailovna Volkonskaya

Princess Maria Mikhailovna Volkonskaya (born on 13 March 1863 - she was killed on 19 May 1943, Moscow, USSR) was a Russian princess, Catholic convert and writer.

== Biography ==
Volkonskaya was born on 13 March 1863 in a very old and aristocratic Russian family of Orthodox religion. In 1901 in Switzerland, like many of her relatives, including brothers Alexandr Volkonsky, Serge Volkonsky, Peter Volkonsky, she adopted Catholicism. For many years she lived in Rome, was an active parishioner of the Russian Catholic Church of Saint Lawrence, was involved in charity work and in the translations of Catholic spiritual literature into the Russian language. She was killed on 19 May 1943 in Moscow.

== Works ==
Our Lady of Lourdes. - St., 1906.

Don Bosco, the father of orphans and the poor. - St., 1906 Peter Olivain. - Petrograd, 1917.

Brief reflection on the Divine Passion of Christ. - Paris, 1932. The Story of a treatment (typing)
