= Marguerite Roesgen-Champion =

Swiss composer, pianist and harpsichordist

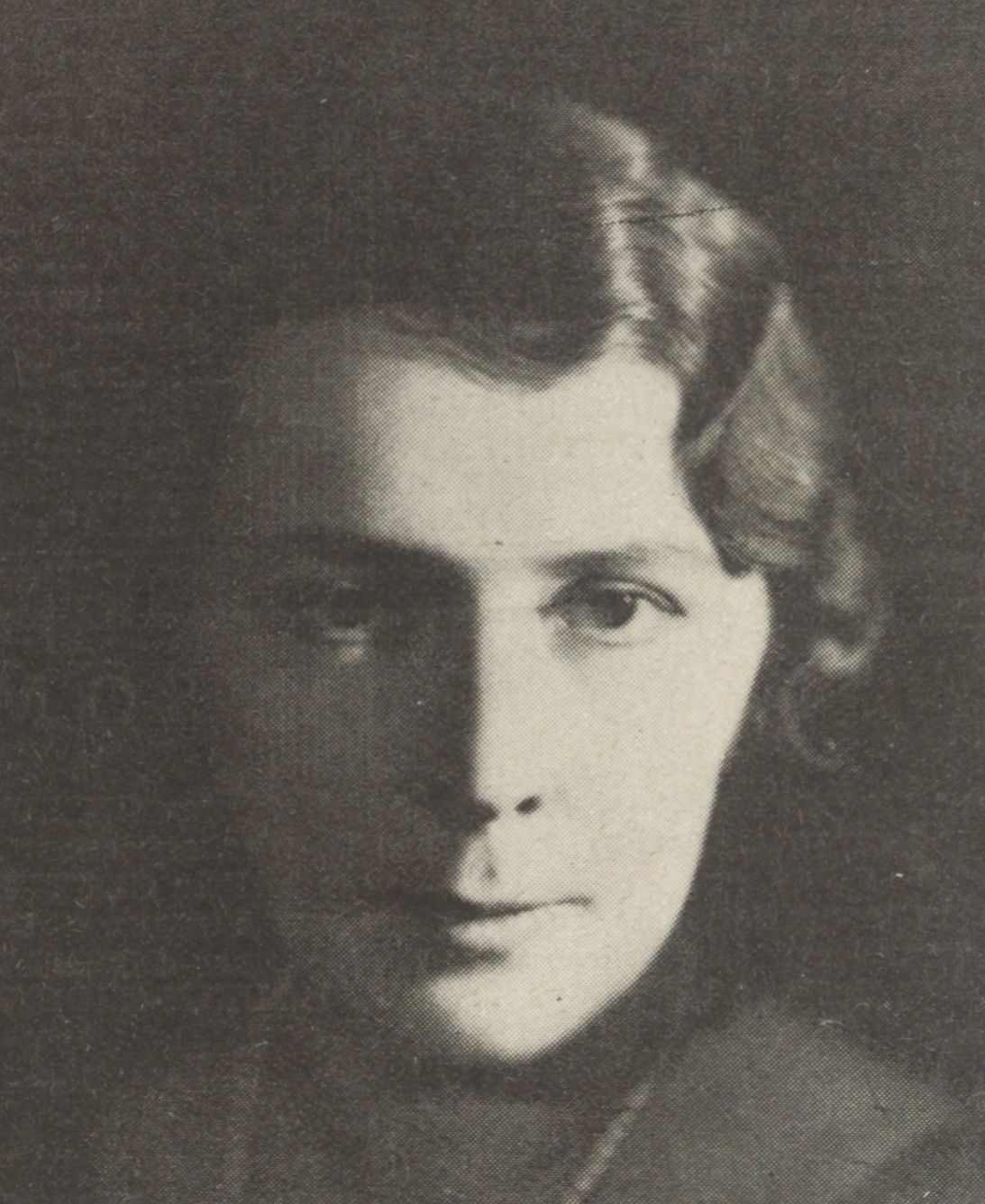
- Marguerite Roesgen-Champion
- Born: 24 January 1894; Geneva, Switzerland
- Died: 30 June 1976 (aged 82); Hyères, France
- Occupations: Composer, pianist, harpsichordist

Marguerite Sara Roesgen-Champion (24 January 1894 – 30 June 1976) was a Swiss composer, pianist and harpsichordist who used the pseudonym Jean Delysse. She composed works for orchestra, harpsichord and piano, as well as chamber and choral works. As a pianist she performed several piano concertos by Mozart and Haydn. On harpsichord she performed compositions for harpsichord by Jean-Henry d'Anglebert and Johann Christoph Friedrich Bach. Roesgen-Champion founded a concert series entitled Suites Française which was used a showcase for students of distinction from the Paris Conservatory.

== Life ==
Marguerite Sara Roesgen-Champion was born on 24 January 1894 in Geneva. She was a composer, pianist and harpsichordist, and used the pseudonym Jean Delysse.

Roesgen-Champion's mother was singer Cecile Roesgen-Liodet, so Marguerite received her first music lessons at home. She studied at the Conservatoire de Musique de Genève, notably piano with Marie Panthès, and composition with Ernest Bloch and Jaques-Dalcroze. She graduated in 1913. From 1926, she lived as a composer in Paris. She composed works for orchestra, harpsichord and piano, as well as chamber and choral works.

As a pianist she performed several piano concertos by Mozart and Haydn. On harpsichord she performed compositions for harpsichord by Jean-Henry d'Anglebert and Johann Christoph Friedrich Bach. She played with orchestras in France, Italy, Spain and the Netherlands.

In 1940 Roesgen-Champion founded a concert series entitled Suites Française which was used a showcase for students of distinction from the Paris Conservatory. She also supported the Orchestre Jane Evrard (also known as the Orchestre féminin de Paris), founded by Jane Evrard, which was an all-female chamber orchestra that performed contemporary works including the premiere of Guy Ropartz' Petite Suite.

Roesgen-Champion died 30 June 1976 in Paris.

== Works ==
- Sonata for Flute and Keyboard
- Blue and Gold Story, piano with 4 hands
- French Suite for flute and harp
- Domine not in Furore for mixed choir a cappella
- Valses for piano
- Concert for saxophone, harpsichord and bassoon
- At the Moon, singing flute and piano
- Concerto grosso for violin, cello, harpsichord and orchestra
