= Peeter Volkonski =

Estonian musician and actor

Prince Peeter Volkonski
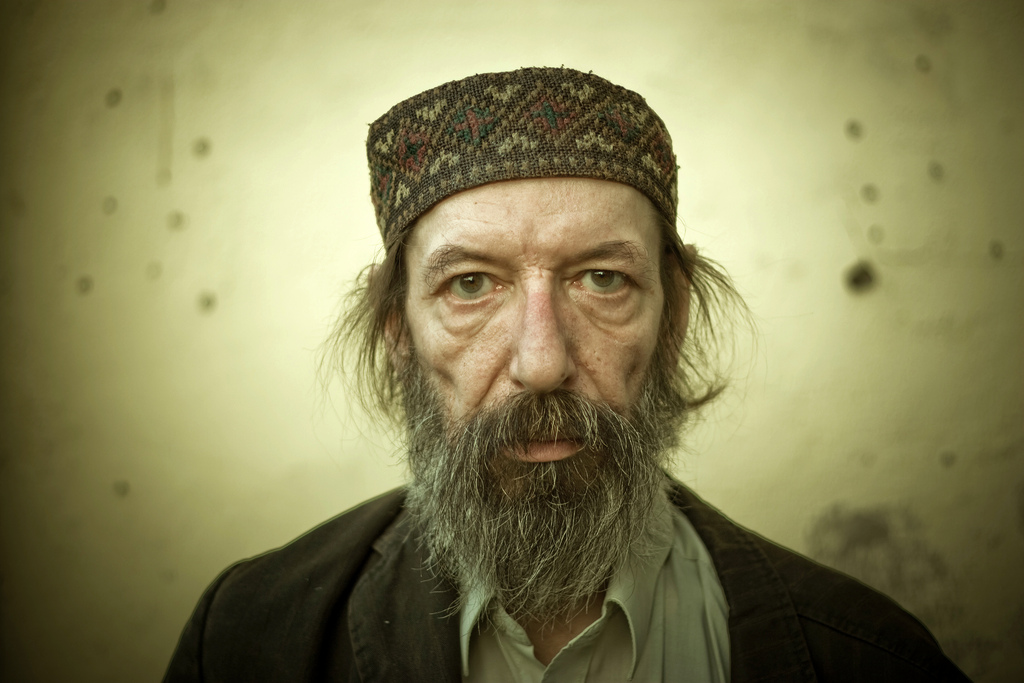

Background information
- Born: Peeter Volkonski; 12 September 1954 (age 71); Tallinn, Estonia
- Genres: Rock, punk
- Occupations: Musician, writer, actor
- Instrument: Vocals
- Years active: 1980–present
- Website: http://volk.ee/ (inactive)

Prince Peeter Volkonski (born 12 September 1954 in Tallinn) is an Estonian rock-musician, composer, actor, and theatre director.

== Biography ==
He became famous with the punk band Propeller, founded in 1978.

In 2015 Volkonski was Free Party's candidate in the Tartu constituency for Estonian parliamentary election. He received 916 votes, which was not enough for a seat in the parliament.

== Ancestry ==
Peeter Volkonski's paternal ancestry comes from the Russian noble Volkonsky family; his father was the Russian composer and harpsichordist Prince Andrei Volkonsky. His paternal grandfather was the noted Russian opera baritone Prince Mikhail Volkonsky and his great-great-great-grandfather was Prince Pyotr Mikhailovich Volkonsky, thus, being a descendant of the princely Rurikid dynasty.

His maternal ancestry is Estonian; his mother was the Estonian translator and writer Helvi Jürisson, who was a noted poet and author of children's literature.

Ancestors of Peeter Volkonski

16. Mikhail, Prince Volkonsky
8. Piotr, Prince Volkonsky
17. HSH Elisabeth, Princessa Volkonskaya
4. Mikhail, Prince Volkonsky
18. Andrei, Prince Shakhovsky
9. Elisabeth, Princess Shakhovskaya
19. Sofia, Countessa Olsufieva
2. Andrei, Prince Volkonsky
20. Boleslav Petkevich
10. Georgi Petkevich
21.
5. Kira Petkevich
22. Ignat Goremykin
11. Vera Goremykina
23. Vera Nikolaevna N.
1. Peeter, Prince Volkonski
24.
12. Johan Jürisson
25.
6. Nikolai Jürisson
26.
13. Pauline Jürisson
27.
3. Helvi Jürisson
28.
14. Märt Kott
29.
7. Emilie Jürisson
30.
15. Charlotte Kott
31.

== Decorations ==
- 2001 Fifth Class Order of the White Star of the Republic of Estonia.
