= Grigory Volkonsky =

Grigory Volkonsky, also transliterated as Grigoriy Volkonskiy, etc. may refer to the following Russian noble persons of the Volkonsky family:

- Grigory Konstantinovich Volkonsky (cca. 1560 — 1634), prince, okolnichy and voivode, who repelled the Polish attack on Moscow in 1618.
- Grigory Ivanovich Volkonsky (1670-1715 or 1718), Russian statesman, chief commandant of Tula and Yaroslavl, one of the first 9 senators.
- Grigory Semyonovich Volkonsky (1721) (cca. 1673 — 1721), Russian military leader, major general, participant in the Northern War.
- Grigory Grigoryevich Volkonsky (1691-1758), prince, colonel, Simbirsk governor.
- Grigory Semyonovich Volkonsky (1742-1824), Russian military leader, cavalry general.
- Grigory Petrovich Volkonsky (1808-1882) knyaz, Russian diplomat, actual state councilor, chamberlain
