= Isabelle Nef =

Swiss pianist and harpsichordist (1895–1976)

Isabelle Nef, née Lander (27 September 1895 – 2 January 1976) was a Swiss pianist and harpsichordist, as well as a professor at the Conservatoire de musique de Genève.

== Life ==
Born in Geneva, Nef studied the piano at the conservatoire de Genève with Marie Panthès then, in Paris, composition with Vincent d'Indy and harpsichord with Wanda Landowska.

She had a concert career in Europe, South America and North America including Seattle, New York and Washington in USSR, and South Africa and in Australia. For her 80th birthday, she performed works by Mozart and Bach on fortepiano at the Temple de Saint-Gervais in Geneva.

In 1936 she became the first harpsichord teacher at the Conservatoire de Genève. She then became an honorary professor and remained there until 1975 when she retired at the age of 80. She died in Collex-Bossy. She was succeeded by harpsichordist Christiane Jaccottet.

A path was given her name in Collex-Bossy.
