= SS Krusaa =

A number of ships were named Krusaa, including:

- SS Krusaa (1904), a Danish cargo ship in service 1934–37
- SS Krusaa (1939), a Danish cargo ship in service 1949–60
