= Lydia Davydova =

Lydia Anatolyevna Davydova (Russian: Лидия Анатольевна Давыдова) (19 January 1932 – 2 March 2011) was a Russian soprano, harpsichordist and a chamber music performer. As a singer her repertoire encompassed on one extreme the latest contemporary music, most particularly the music of Andrei Volkonsky, and on the other Renaissance and Early Baroque vocal music. Spending much of her life and career in Moscow, she was artistic director of the "Madrigal" early music ensemble and was decorated People's Artist of Russia (2001).

== Biography and career ==
Davydova was born in Leningrad. Her father, a chemical engineer, and her mother, a singer, both died leaving their daughter an orphan when she was only 14. Her aunt, the singer M. Hortik, and her mother's cousin, the famous Russian pianist, music teacher and composer Samuil Feinberg, played a crucial part in her life and upbringing.

As a child she studied piano at a music school in Leningrad, later at the music college associated with St. Petersburg Conservatory, and later yet at the college associated with Moscow Conservatory. In 1957 she graduated from Moscow Conservatory, where she studied piano performance with Nina Emelyanova (a former student of Feinberg's). Despite her lifelong desire to become a singer and the lessons she took with M. Hortik, Davydova's vocal talent remained unappreciated for a long time. She applied to vocal departments of the Conservatory and other music colleges in Moscow eight times, but was not admitted. While studying piano at the Conservatory she took lessons with the legendary voice coach Dora Belyavskaya, who expressed her doubt that Davydova would ever become a professional singer.

Davydova was "discovered" as a singer by the composer Andrei Volkonsky. The premiere of his Mirror Suite at the Moscow Conservatory (1962) was also Davydova's debut as a soprano. Over the next decade she became the Soviet Union's preeminent singer of new music, and participated in various concert projects with the composer. Denisov, recognising Davydova was originally trained as a pianist, was impressed by her abilities as a singer: "perhaps her voice was not really so large, but her internal musicality and her understanding of everything that she performed always astonished." Furthermore, her accuracy and ability to sight-read were ideal qualities for performing avant-garde music: "if she memorized something, then even if all the instruments around her made mistakes, she would still sing exactly perfectly. Moreover, she was a musician without perfect pitch, and nevertheless, she could sing even without a preparatory pitch for the first note."

In 1965 Volkonsky founded an early music ensemble, "Madrigal", with Davydova as its soloist. The ensemble has pioneered performance of Renaissance and Early Baroque vocal music in the USSR. After Volkonsky had emigrated to France in 1972, Davydova directed “Madrigal” until 1983 and again returned as the ensemble's artistic director in 1992. During performances of the ensemble she often accompanied other soloists on a harpsichord. Davydova remained the follower and one of the principal keepers of Volkonsky's artistic creed in Russia.

Davydova specialized in performing the most difficult vocal chamber music. In parallel with performing early music with “Madrigal”, she performed as a soloist works by 20th-century composers. She was the first to introduce Soviet listeners to vocal works of the contemporary Western composers: Charles Ives, Béla Bartók, Luciano Berio, Anton Webern, John Cage, and Paul Hindemith. She also sang chamber music of contemporary Russian avant-garde composers. She has premiered works by Andrei Volkonsky (Mirror Suite, 1962, Laments of Shchaza, 1964?), Edison Denisov (Sun of the Incas, fp 1964), Dmitri Smirnov (The Handful of Sand, fp 1971; The Sorrow of Past Days, fp 1977; The Seasons, fp 1980; Fearful Symmetry, fp 1981; Song of Destiny, fp 1981; Six Poems, fp 1986), Sofia Gubaidulina (Roses, fp 1974), Alfred Schnittke (Three Scenes, fp 1981), and Vyacheslav Artyomov (Invocations, 1981?).

== Personal life ==
Husband: Leonard Daniltsev (1931–1997), a writer and an artist. Children: Gleb Daniltsev (1968) and Mariana Daniltseva (1972).

== Discography ==
=== CD ===
- 2003 — Andrei Volkonsky: Mirror Suite;
- 2003 — Edison Denisov: Les Pleurs;
- 2005 — Igor Stravinsky: Songs (Alexei Lubimov, piano);
- 2007 — Béla Bartók: Vocal Cycles (Alexei Lubimov, piano).
