= Esko Laine =

Finnish bassist (born 1961)

- Born: 1961 (age 64–65); Helsinki, Finland
- Genres: Classical
- Occupations: Musician, professor
- Instrument: Double bass

Esko Laine (born 1961 in Helsinki) is a Finnish bassist. He is a professor of music at Hochschule für Musik "Hanns Eisler" in Berlin and principal double bassist for the Berlin Philharmonic.

Laine began his musical career as a cellist but switched to the double bass. He had thirteen years of instruction from Jussi Javas at the Hyvinkää Conservatoire, and he attended the Hotchkiss School in Lakeville, Connecticut, graduating in 1980. At the age of 18, Laine joined the Finnish National Opera Orchestra and appeared as soloist with the Finnish Radio Symphony Orchestra. He continued his studies from 1982 to 1985 with Günter Klaus at the Frankfurt Musikhochschule, with Franco Petracchi at the Conservatoire de Musique de Genève, and at the Menuhin Academy in Gstaad.

He became the first Finnish musician to obtain a post at the Berlin Philharmonic when he joined in 1986. Laine was a principal from 1999 to 2001 and again since 2008. He has won several international prizes such as Isle of Man, International Instrumental Competition Markneukirchen, and ARD International Music Competition.

Laine plays a double bass made by Giuseppe Rocca in 1839.
