= Johnny Aubert (pianist) =

Swiss pianist and music educator

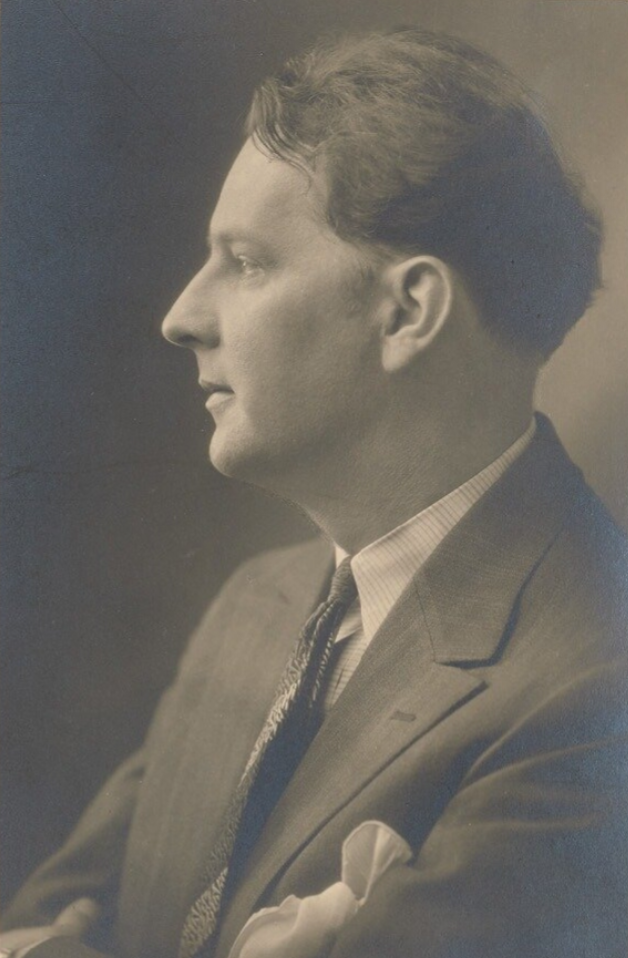
Portrait by Frédéric Boissonnas, c. 1930

Johnny Aubert (real name John Adolphe Aubert; 11 November 1889 – 1 May 1954) was a Swiss classical pianist and music educator.

== Life ==
Aubert was born on 11 November 1889 in Geneva in a family of musicians. He studied at the Conservatoire de musique de Genève with Oscar Schulz and Marie Panthès and graduated in 1909 with distinction for "excellence" and a Liszt Prize. In the following years he won an international piano competition in Paris organised by the magazine Musica and received a grand piano from the Gaveau house as a prize.

=== Concerts activity ===
After his studies he gave many concerts in Switzerland and abroad. In 1921 he was engaged as a soloist for the Orchestre de la Suisse Romande with whom he played piano concertos by Ludwig van Beethoven, Franz Liszt and Béla Bartók. With the Orchestre Lamoureux he played Beethoven's Piano Concerto No. 5. With the violinist Francis MacMillen he made a concert tour through Europe and the United States. In his last years his hearing decreased. Nevertheless, he played many more concerts and piano recitals. Obstructed by the paralysis of his arm, Aubert played for the last time in public on 31 January 1954.

Aubert died in Geneva at age 65 in May the same year.

=== Pedagogic activity ===
From 1912 he was a professor at the Conservatoire de musique de Genève, where he taught for forty years. Among his students was the Russian composer and harpsichordist Andrei Volkonsky.
