= Marie Panthès =

French pianist (1871–1955)

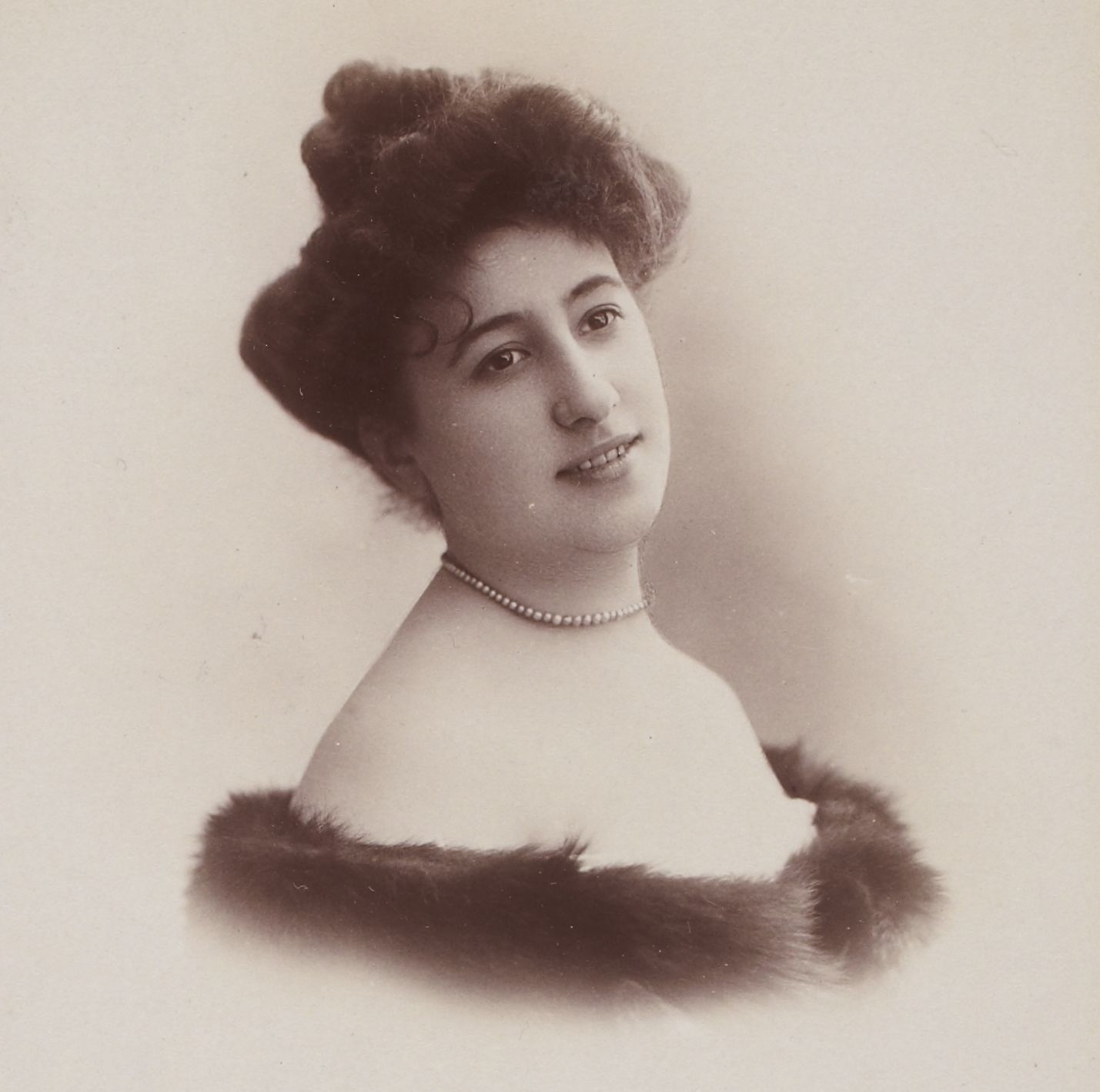
- Born: November 3, 1871; Odesa, Russian Empire (now Ukraine)
- Died: March 11, 1955 (aged 83)
- Burial place: Cimetière des Rois
- Education: Conservatoire de Paris, Geneva, Switzerland
- Occupation: Pianist

Marie Panthès (3 November 1871 – 11 March 1955) was a French pianist, specializing in romantic piano, especially the interpretation of the works of Frédéric Chopin.

== Life ==
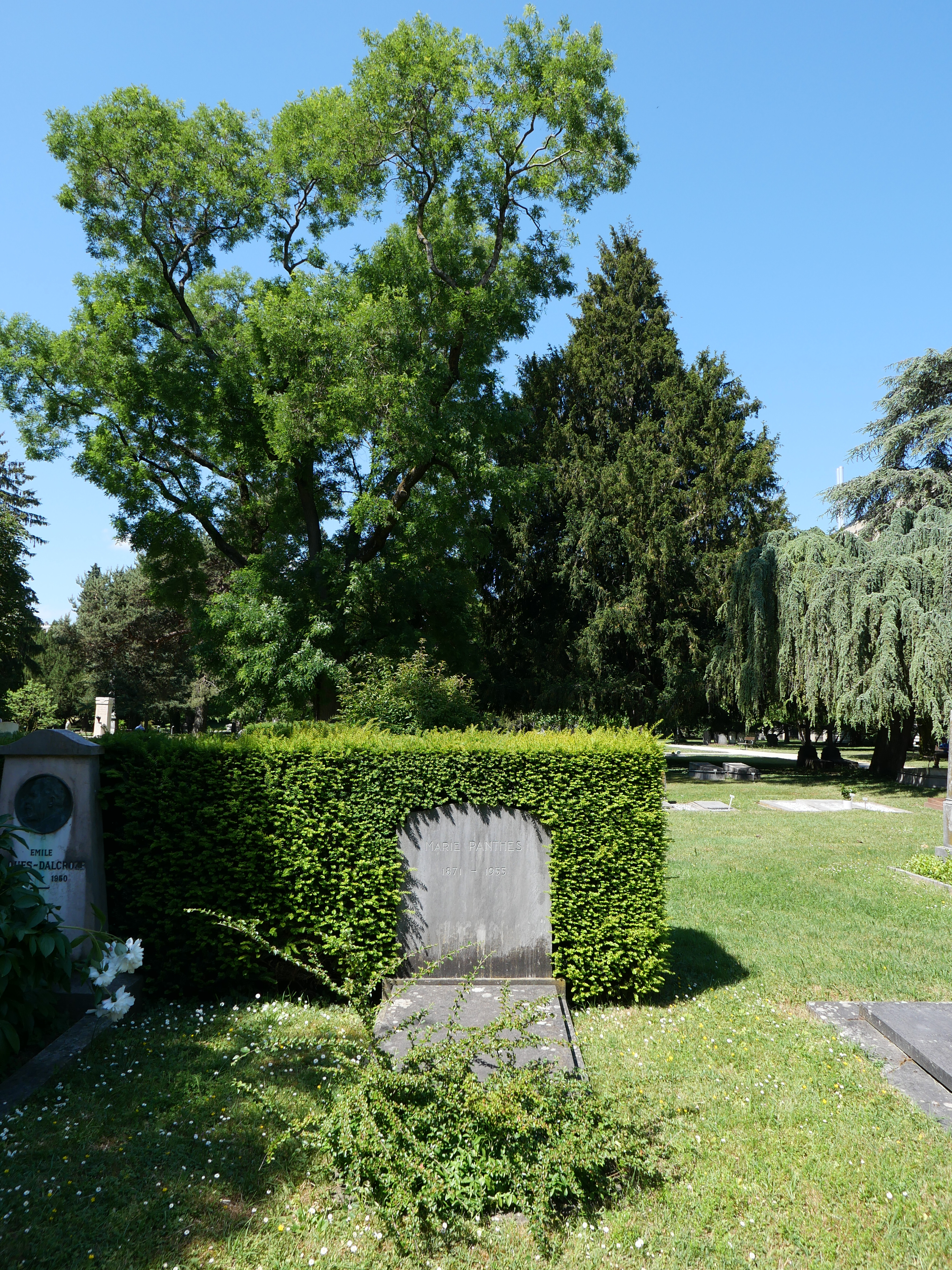
Panthès' grave

Panthès was born in Odessa (Russian Empire) of French parents. She studied the piano at the Conservatoire de Paris in an upper grade class, then with Henry Fissot and Louise-Aglaé Massart-Masson where she won first prize at the age of 14. In 1897, she toured with the violinist Alexandre Petschnikoff and became famous thanks to numerous European tours.

In 1904, she began teaching at the Conservatoire de musique de Genève. She then left this post in 1917 because of differences of opinion with the conservatory committee. She moved with her violinist husband, Maurice Darier, to Lausanne. She returned to Geneva in 1931 and taught for twenty years at the Conservatoire de musique de Genève. In 1951, she said she stopped because she suffered from a melanoma in her head. In 1954, she began treatment with a cancer specialist in New York, Dr. Revici. She died there on 11 March 1955 at the age of 83. Her grave is located at Cimetière des Rois in Geneva.

Among her notable students were Julien-François Zbinden, Johnny Aubert, Isabelle Nef and Marguerite Roesgen-Champion.
