= Vera Griner =

Russia-born Soviet rhythmitician

Vera Aleksandrovna Griner
- Вера Александровна Гринер
- Born: Vera Aleksandrovna Alvang; April 4, 1890; Saint Petersburg, Russian Empire (present-day Russia)
- Died: June 24, 1992 (aged 102); Moscow, Russia
- Occupation: Rhythmitician

Vera Aleksandrovna Griner (Note: Russian: Вера Александровна Гринер, romanized: Vera Aleksandrovna Griner) (née Alvang, (Note: Russian: Альванг, romanized: Alvang) 5 April 1890 – 24 June 1992) was a Russian Empire-born Soviet rhythmitician.

Griner was born in Saint Petersburg. Her father, Alexander Alvang, was a well-known barrister. Since 1908 the Alvang family had been living in Munich. It was here that Alvang became acquainted with Rhythmics. In 1911 she came to Dresden, where she took lessons from Dalcroze, and attended the newly founded Hellerau Institute. In 1912 Alvang, together with several pupils of Dalcroze came to St. Petersburg to train to be a teacher with courses set by Prince Serge Wolkonsky. After a year she was a teacher and a student of Hellerau, and in May 1913 she graduated from the Institute and returned to St. Petersburg to commence teaching, which she continued to do until 1970.

Alongside the courses, she gave lectures to audiences in St. Petersburg. In her archives there is a list of places where she worked detailing more than 30 organizations. In 1914 after the outbreak of the First World War, the courses were closed. The foreign teachers left the Russian Empire, and Alvang went to Moscow. At this time she married Emmanuel Griner. In Moscow she began her work at the School of Alexandrova, and following this she went to the Rhythmic Institute which was established in July 1919. It was directed by Nina Alexandrova, and Griner, together with many people familiar to her from the previous period, such as Prince Wolkonsky, got the teacher. After the Institute's closure, Griner worked at several organizations. Schukin Theatrical School was the most notable of these; she began there in 1939.

In 1991, Fédération internationale des enseignants de rythmique gave her the Honoured Member of this Federation. Griner died in Moscow.

== Selected publications ==
- C.Bommeli, Vera Griner - Le Rythme, Geneve, bull.8-9, 1990–1991, p. 24-25
- Vera Griner, ‘A Year at the Émile Jaques-Dalcroze Institute in Hellerau, 1911–1912’, F.I.E.R. Bulletin 1 (1981): 4–7, p. 5
- Гринер, В., & Трофимова, М. (1996). Ритмика Далькроза и свободный танец в России 20-х годов. Мнемозина. Документы и факты из истории русского театра XX века/ред.-сост. ВВ Иванов. М.: ГИТИС, 124-148.
