= Andrei Volkonsky =

Russian composer and harpsichordist

Prince Andrei Mikhaylovich Volkonsky (also Andrey, André, Mikhailovich, Michailovich, Volkonski, Volkonskiy) (Russian: Андрей Михайлович Волконский; 14 February 1933 – 16 September 2008) was a Russian composer, harpsichordist, and key figure in early music revival in Soviet Russia.

== Biography ==
A descendant of Volkonsky, Russian aristocratic princely family in exile, he was born in Geneva in 1933. As a child he played his improvisations to Sergei Rachmaninoff. Then he studied piano at the Conservatoire de Musique de Genève with Johnny Aubert and with the legendary Dinu Lipatti. The Volkonsky family resettled in Moscow in 1947. From 1950 to 1954 he studied at the Moscow Conservatory under Yuri Shaporin, but was expelled for breaking some minor disciplinary rules. In 1956 Volkonsky began the career of a harpsichord and organ player. He pioneered performing renaissance and baroque music, which had hitherto not been played in the USSR. In 1965 he founded an ensemble of early music, called "The Ensemble Madrigal".

He was among the first Soviet composers who began experimenting with twelve-tone and serial techniques. An early work in this style was his piano suite "Musica Stricta" (1956). His works greatly influenced his colleagues. Composing such music at that time was an act of courage: it was a protest against the suppression of freedom, and specifically against the requirement that the composers in Soviet Russia follow the narrowly prescribed doctrines of the Socialist Realism. It is not surprising that his music, attempting at a real renewal and enrichment of the musical language in Russia, was banned from performance. Volkonsky said that he had been fighting for 25 years to establish and preserve his artistic individuality in Moscow before requesting an exit visa in December 1972.

"The next day I was expelled from the Union of Composers. All my concerts were cancelled. The record company was instructed not to release the records I had made…" (Andrei Volkonsky)

But he was not allowed to leave the country immediately. Five months of suspense and unemployment followed, during which he hounded the passport office and sold most of his belongings, including scores and books, to support himself.

"The Soviet authorities finally had the intelligence and wisdom to release the composer who was of no use to them in the fulfilment of their music five-year plans, who could not compose that only kind of music which was allowed in the Soviet Union… I was just a speck of dirt in the grand marble palace of the Soviet Culture." (Andrei Volkonsky)

Andrei Volkonsky emigrated to the West in 1973. He first returned to Geneva, where he was born, and later settled in Aix-en-Provence (in the South of France) where he died at the age of 75. He was married (1954–1960) to Estonian poet and children's book author Helvi Jürisson. They had a son, Peeter Volkonski (Piotr Andreevitch Volkonsky), an Estonian actor and rock-musician.

== Ancestry ==
Ancestors of Andrei Volkonsky

16. Sergei, Prince Volkonsky
8. Mikhail, Prince Volkonsky
17. Maria Raevskaya
4. Piotr, Prince Volkonsky
18. Grigori, Prince Volkonsky
9. Elisabeth, Princessa Volkonskaya
19. Maria, Countessa Benckendorf
2. Mikhail, Prince Volkonsky
20. Ivan, Prince Shakhovsky
10. Andrei, Prince Shakhovsky
21. Sofia, Countessa Musina-Puschkina
5. Elisabeth, Princess Shakhovskaya
22. Aleksandr Olsufiev
11. Sofia Olsufieva
23. Maria Vassilevna Naryshkina
1. Andrei, Prince Volkonsky
24.
12. Boleslav Petkevich
25.
6. Georgi Petkevich
26.
13.
27.
3. Kira Petkevich
28. Ivan Grigorievich Goremykin
14. Ignat Goremykin
29. Anna Petrovna N.
7. Vera Goremykina
30.
15. Vera Nikolaevna N.
31.

== Selected works ==
=== Orchestral ===
- Concerto for Orchestra (1953)
- Capriccio for orchestra (1954)
- Serenade to an Insect for chamber orchestra (1959)
- Replica for small orchestra (1970)
- Immobile for piano and orchestra (1978)

=== Sonata ===
- Piano Sonata in B♭ Major (1949)
- Sonata for Viola and Piano, Op. 8 (1955–56)

=== Cantata ===
- Rus, cantata on text by Nikolai Gogol (1952)
- The Face of Peace, cantata on text by Paul Éluard (1952)

=== Voice ===
- Mirror Suite for soprano and 5 players: Flute, Violin, Guitar, Organ and Percussion on text by Federico García Lorca (1960)
- Lamentations of Schchaza for soprano, Cor Anglais, Violin, Marimba, Vibrafono, and Cembalo on text by Schchaza (1961)
- Concerto Itinérant for soprano, violin percussion and 26 instruments, text from the Rubayiat of Omar Khayyám (1967)
- Lied for 4 voices (1974)
- 7 Sacred Songs for three male voices (solo or choir) (arrangement of Russian-orthodoxe liturgical songs) (1984)
- Was noch lebt for mezzo soprano and string trio on text by Johannes Bobrowski (1985)
- Psalm 148 for three voices (solo or choir), organ and timpani (1989)

=== Chorus ===
- Two Japanese Songs for chorus, electric sound and percussion (1957)

=== Piano ===
- Piano Quintet, Op. 5 (1954)
- Fantasia for Piano (1955)
- Musica Stricta (fantasia ricercata), Op. 11 for piano (1957)

=== Ensemble ===
- String Quartet, Op. 6 (1955)
- Music for 12 Instruments, Op. 12 (1957)
- Jeu à Trois for flute, violin and harpsichord (1962)
- Les mailles du Temps for 3 instrumental groups (1970)
- Maqam for tar and harpsichord (1974)
- Carrefour for ensemble (1992)

=== Film music ===
- Novye pokhozhdeniya Kota v Sapogakh (1958)/Новые похождения кота в сапогах (as A. Volkonsky)
- Marya-iskusnitsa (1960)/Марья-искусница/Maria, the Wonderful Weaver/The Magic Weaver (USA)
- Priklyucheniya Krosha (1961)/Приключения Кроша/Adventures of Krosh
- 3+2 (1962)/Три плюс два/Three Plus Two
- Across the Cemetery (1963)/Через кладбище
- Voyna pod kryshami (1967)/Война под крышами/The War Under the Roofs
- Dead Season (1968)/Мёртвый сезон
- Mogila Lva (1971)/Могила льва/The Lion's Grave
- Pereprava (1987)/Переправа

== Recordings ==
- CTH 2502: ANDRE VOLKONSKY

Suite de los espejos/Spiegel-Suite/Mirror Suite/La Suite de miroirs Federico Garcia Lorca (1959)

1. Symbol 1:15
2. Der grofte Spiegel 0:15
3. Reflex 1:18
4. Strahlen 0:19
5. Widerhall 1:01
6. Shinto - Weg der Gotter 1:16
7. Die Augen 6:12
8. Initium 0:50
9. Schlaflied fur den schlafrigen Spiegel 5:16

Les Plaintes de Shchaza/Die Klagen der Shchaza/Laments of Shchaza (1960)

10. Lento ma non troppo 2:19
11. Presto 2:05
12. Lento rubato 6:38
13. Aussi vite que possible 5:07

Concert itinerant/Das wandernde Konzert/Wandering Concerto 30:33 (Omar Hayyam) (1964–67)

14.

(1-9) Lydia Davydova (Sopran), Andre Volkonsky (Orgel) und Solisten des Symphony Orchestra of Leningrad Philharmonic, Leitung: Igor Blazhkov. Aufnahme: 1967 (10-13) Lydia Davydova (Sopran), Andre Volkonsky (Cembalo) und Solisten des Symphony Orchestra of Leningrad Philharmonic, Leitung: Igor Blazhkov. Aufnahme: 1965 (14) Tatiana Marushchak (Sopran), Grigory Sandomirsky (Violine), Natalia Pshenichnikova (Flote), Mark Pekarsky Percussion Ensemble, Collegium Musicum Chamber Orchestra, Leitung: Timur Mynbaev Live-Aufnahme beim, Alternativa?" Festival Moskau im Oktober 1989

Bella, CD, ADD, 1965-1989
