= Jane Evrard =

French musician (1893–1984)

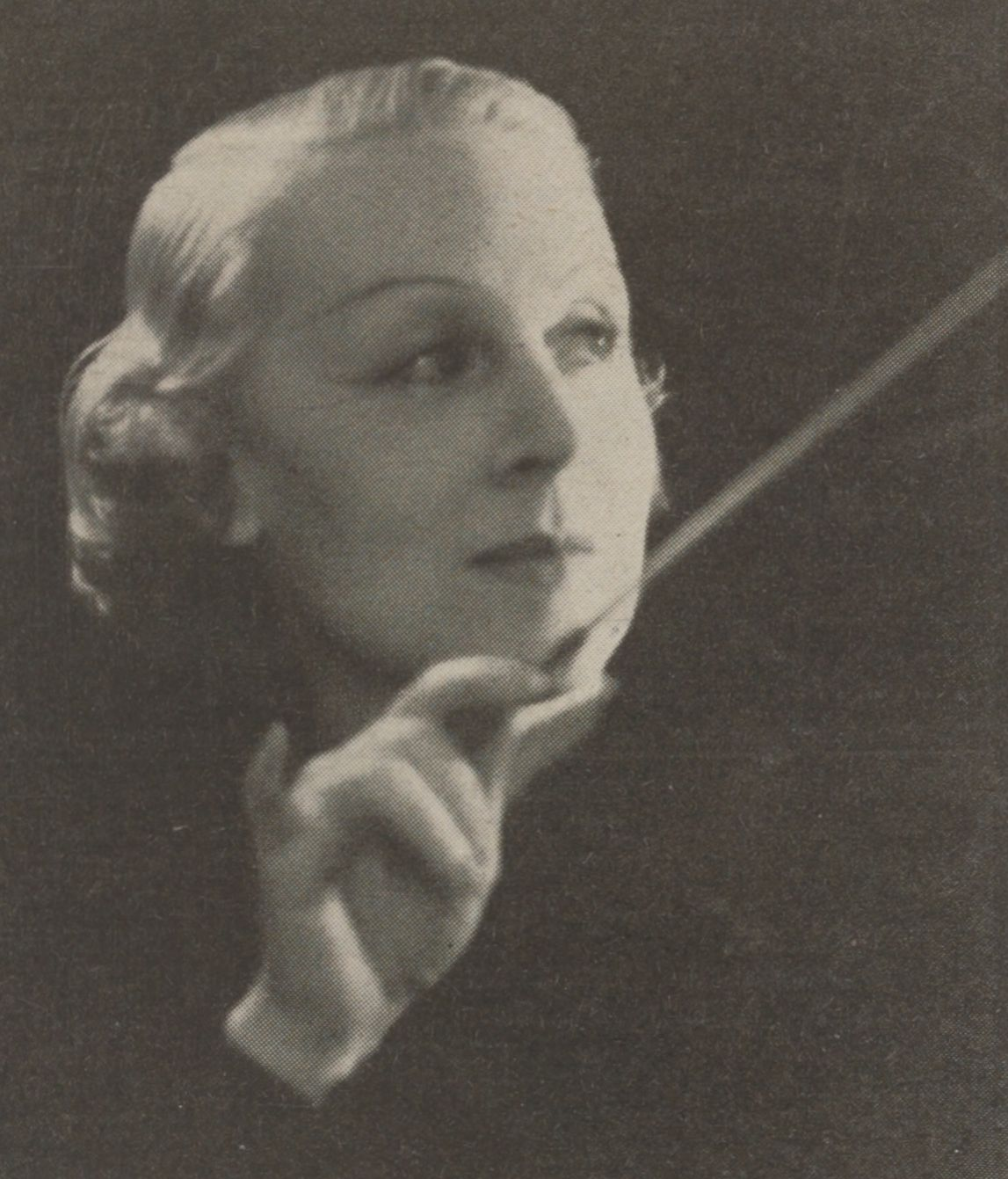
Jane Evrard

Jane Evrard was the name adopted by Jeanne Chevallier Poulet (5 February 1893 – 4 November 1984), a French musician. In 1930, she founded the Orchestre féminin de Paris, becoming one of the first professional woman conductors in France. (Note: Evrard referred to herself as the first. Although other women had led orchestras in France prior to 1930, they were usually composers conducting their own work. Evrard appears to be the first French woman to conduct and manage her own ensemble in a professional capacity.)

== Early life and education ==
Jeanne Stéphanie Chevallier was born in Neuilly-Plaisance to Jean Joseph Chevallier, a civil servant and retired naval officer, and Blanche Félicie Boissard, a musician. At age seven, she took up the violin, and was accepted into the Conservatoire de Paris at twelve. At fourteen she won a première médaille for solfège and entered the studio of Augustin Lefort, where she met fellow student and violinist Gaston Poulet, whom she married in 1912.

== Career ==
Evrard and Poulet frequently played together professionally. While they were still students, they met Georges Rabini, conductor of the orchestra Concerts Rouge, a popular institution that encouraged new talent. Through his contacts they played concerts at the Deauville casino, performances of the L'Arlésienne at the Théâtre de l'Odéon, and in the orchestra that Alphonse Hasselmans assembled in 1910. In 1913 Pierre Monteux hired them to play for the premiere performance of Stravinsky's The Rite of Spring.

Evrard occasionally played second violin in her husband's string quartet, Quartet Poulet. In 1917, they performed Claude Debussy's Quartet in G minor for the composer. According to Poulet's grandson, Debussy exclaimed "Don't change anything, from now on this is how it should be played!" (Note: “Ne changez rien, dorénavant c’est comme cela qu’il devra être joué!")

Poulet's burgeoning career as a soloist, leader of the Quartet Poulet and conductor of his own orchestral enterprise, the Association des Concerts Poulet, overshadowed Evrard, who was raising their two children and teaching violin. They separated in 1928 or 1929.

Evrard was active in the amateur music scene in the 1920s, arranging chamber music recitals and conducting small ensembles for charity events. She also appeared in several motion pictures in the late 1920s, including Henry Roussel's La Valse de l'adieu (1927) and Le Collier de la reine (1928). She created her stage name at this time, combining an anglicized version of her first name with the name of a village where she had lived as a child.

== Orchestre féminin de Paris ==
In 1930, encouraged by critic Émile Vuillermoz, who had been impressed by her work with amateur musicians, Evrard founded an all-woman orchestra, the Orchestre féminin de Paris, consisting of twenty-five string players. Because it was difficult to find women woodwind and brass players, (Note: Playing an instrument which required puckering one's lips or puffing out one's cheeks was considered unsuitable for a lady.) the orchestra performed as a string ensemble, only rarely engaging male musicians.

As the only string ensemble in Paris in the 1930s and therefore without competition for programming the large repertoire written for their configuration, they developed specialties in both early and modern music.

The first half of an Orchestre féminin concert often featured early music by composers such as Jean-Baptiste Lully, Claude Gervaise, Michel Blavet, Andre Gretry and François Couperin, followed in the second half by contemporary works. Evrard championed living composers. Several of them, including Albert Roussel, Joaquín Rodrigo, Florent Schmitt, and occasional guest artist Marguerite Roesgen-Champion, wrote pieces especially for the orchestra, who gave their premiere performances.

The orchestra toured Europe, playing in France, Portugal, Spain and the Netherlands. Reviews of the orchestra's performances were very positive; many critics commented on the appearance of the women as well as the music. Evrard was tall, blonde and glamorous. She and her musicians wore long, black evening gowns, with their hair beautifully styled.

Do you know this orchestra? It is a charming ensemble. Two dozen elegant young women, all virtuosos with the bow, create a spectacle infinitely pleasing to the eye and the ear.
Mme. Jane Evrard, delicate and blonde Amazon, supervises and directs the frolic with a supple and attentive baton. No pretension, no histrionics in her gestures. Just a soupçon of coquetry, when, with a finger discreetly placed on her lips, she tempers the brilliance of a sforzato [sic] or summons a ghostly pianissimo.

— Jacques Ibert, Marianne, 24 November 1934

== Later life ==
The orchestra performed less frequently during the war; many women left for positions in other orchestras which had lost men to the war effort. They performed their last concert of premieres on 12 May 1942. After the war, the orchestra was not revived. Evrard continued to teach and to conduct on a free-lance basis until her retirement in 1965. In the 1970s, she began writing her memoirs, Regards sur mon passé. (Note: The unpublished manuscript is held by the Evrard-Poulet Archives.)

Jane Evrard died in Paris aged 91 and was buried at Ivry Cemetery.

== Sources ==
- Hamer, Laura (Autumn 2011). "On the Conductor's Podium: Jane Evrard and the Orchestre féminin de Paris". The Musical Times. 152 (1916): 81–100. JSTOR 23037975.
- Hamer, Laura (2018). Female Composers, Conductors, Performers: Musiciennes of Interwar France, 1919–1939. Routledge. ISBN 9781138212039.
