= William Chapman Nyaho =

American musician

William H. Chapman Nyaho (surname Chapman Nyaho; b. Washington, D.C., 1958) is an American concert pianist specializing in solo piano music by composers from Africa and the African diaspora.

He graduated from the Achimota School in Achimota, where he studied piano with John Barham. He holds B.A. and M.A. degrees in music from St Peter's College, Oxford University, an M.M. from the Eastman School of Music, and a D.M.A. from the University of Texas at Austin. He has also studied at the Conservatoire de Musique de Genève. He has taught at the University of Louisiana at Lafayette, Colby College and Pomona College, Willamette University. He is currently on the faculty of Pacific Lutheran University and the Interlochen Arts Academy Summer Camp. He also teaches privately and performs nationally and internationally giving recitals, masterclasses and workshops.

His repertoire includes music by Gamal Abdel-Rahim, Margaret Bonds, Samuel Coleridge-Taylor, Robert Nathaniel Dett, Halim El-Dabh, Coleridge-Taylor Perkinson, Gyimah Labi, and Joshua Uzoigwe. He has performed throughout the U.S., Canada, and Europe, as well as in China.

He has compiled and edited a five-volume anthology Piano Music of Africa and the African Diaspora published by Oxford University Press.

He lives in Seattle, Washington.

== Recordings ==
- Senku: Piano Music by Composers of African Descent (MSR Classics)
- ASA: Piano Music by Composers of African Descent (MSR Classics)
- "Aaron Copland: Music for Two Pianos" Nyaho/Garcia Duo (Centaur Records)
- ‘Kete: Piano Music of Africa and the African Diaspora’

(MSR Classics)

- ‘Five by Four’

Nyaho/Garcia Duo (MSR Classics)
