= Madrigal (ensemble) =

The Ensemble Madrigal (Moscow) is an early music group. It was formed in 1965 by the Russian composer and harpsichord player Andrey Volkonsky to perform Russian and Western sacred music of the Middle Ages, Renaissance, and Baroque eras.

Its members were featured soloists of the Moscow State Philharmonic Society. In the intervening years, the 12-member group has expanded its repertoire to include a broad range of sacred and secular vocal and instrumental works of the 16th-18th centuries from across Europe. After the emigration of Andrey Volkonsky to the West, the ensemble was directed by the organist Oleg Yanchenko, and since 1993 by the singer Lydia Davydova.

As the name suggests, the ensemble specializes in madrigals and other secular genres of Renaissance and Baroque. The group has recorded more than 30 vinyl disks and has given more than 4000 performances in Russia, Germany, Italy, Belgium, Hungary, Poland, and elsewhere. The Ensemble Madrigal enjoys a permanent relationship with the Tchaikovsky Concert Hall in Moscow.

== Reviews ==
"The hype was not justified; it was exceeded! The concert of the Ensemble Madrigal, 'Music of the Castilian Kings', struck the public at the overcrowded Church of St. Joseph both by the choice of repertory and the quality of the performance. The vocalists were excellent, as were the instrumentalists - all brought together by the artistic director of the ensemble, Lydia Davydova; together, they created a miracle. Truly, the fantastic concert of the Ensemble Madrigal demonstrated a high level of skill and gives honour to Russian music and art." (La Verdata, Spain)
