= Francis MacMillen =

American violinist and composer (1885–1973)

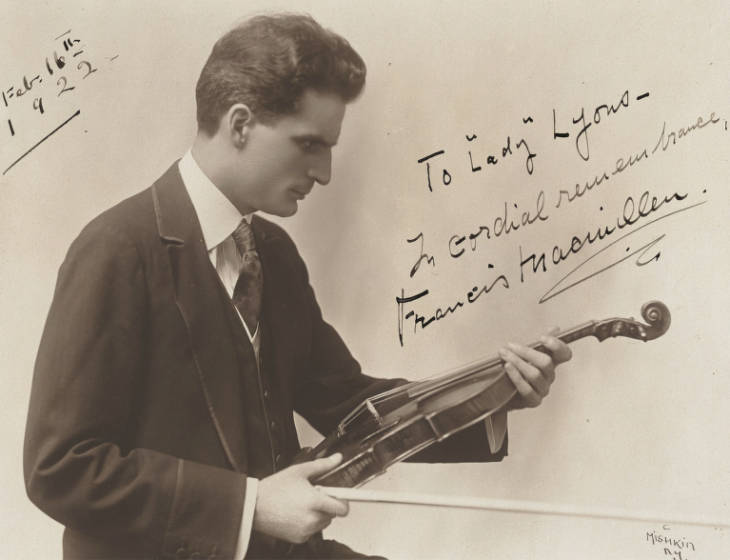
Francis MacMillen in 1922

Francis Rea MacMillen (October 14, 1885 – July 14, 1973) was an American violinist.

== Biography ==
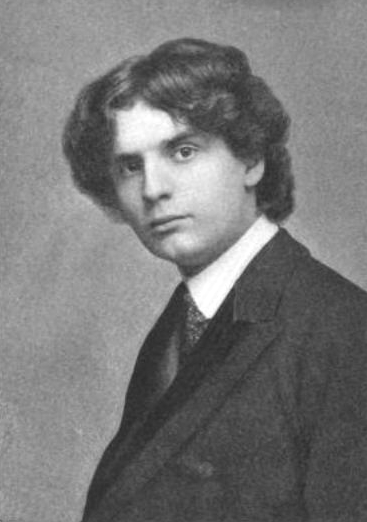
In 1903

Francis MacMillen was born in Marietta, Ohio on October 14, 1885. At the age of seven, he began studying at Chicago Musical College, where his teacher was Bernhard Listemann. From 1895 to 1899, he studied with Carl Markees (a student of Joseph Joachim) and with Karl Halir in Berlin and from 1900 to 1902 with César Thomson at the Royal Conservatory of Brussels, where he received two prizes. In the fall of 1902, he made his debut in a Vauxhall in Brussels, followed by a concert tour through Belgium, Germany and England. In the fall of 1903, he played in London and undertook another concert tour through England. His American debut took place on December 7, 1906 at Carnegie Hall with the New York Symphony Society under the direction of Walter Damrosch. This was followed by an extensive tour with 98 concerts in the East and the Midwest of the United States. In the summer of 1907, he returned to London, where he played three concerts with the Queen's Hall Orchestra under the direction of Henry Wood. Onward, he played in the United States and Europe accompanied by Swiss pianist Johnny Aubert. In November and December 1910 he played again with the New York Symphony Orchestra, conducted by Gustav Mahler. He is also the author of several compositions for the violin: Barcarole, Serenade Nègre, Causerie, Liebeslied, Nijinsky et al.

MacMillen died in Lausanne on July 14, 1973.
