= Helvi Mustonen =

Finnish artist (1947–2025

- Born: 1 July 1947; Kemi, Finland
- Died: 22 May 2025 (aged 77)
- Website: www.helvimustonen.com

Helvi Mustonen (1 July 1947 – 22 May 2025) was a Finnish artist and painter. Her works of art were mainly paintings, but she also created sculptures in bronze. Her art typically had very strong and emotional themes and strong colours. The paintings are usually quite dark and symbolistic.

Mustonen was born in Kemi. She started painting and sculpting in Oulu during the early 1970s and continued in Hyvinkää, where she moved in the early 1980s. She took part in numerous group exhibitions and had her own solo exhibitions in many art museums and galleries in Finland.

Helvi Mustonen was named the Artist of the Year by the Art Guild of Hyvinkää in 2000 and 2011. She died on 22 May 2025, at the age of 77.
