= Helvi Jürisson =

Estonian writer (1928–2023)

Helvi Jürisson (5 October 1928 – 16 September 2023) was an Estonian poet, translator, and children's author, awarded the Order of the White Star, Medal Class, of the Republic of Estonia in 2001.

== Biography ==
Jürisson was born in Tallinn and graduated from the University of Tartu in 1953, where she studied medicine.

She had a son Peeter Volkonski (born 1954), from her marriage to composer Andrei Volkonsky, and a daughter Kerttu Soans (born 1961), from her marriage to artist Olev Soans.

She died on 16 September 2023, at the age of 94.

== Works ==
=== Children's books ===
- "Päike võttis kiirtekannu" (1963)
- "Nukuraamat" (1967)
- "Rähn rätsepaks" (1967)
- "Sputnikute nääriöö" (1967)
- "Tedretähestik" (1970)
- "Kas sa tunned seda teed" (1971)
- "Ahvi trahvimine" (1976)
- "Igaühel oma pesa" 1978)
- "Putukajutud" (1984)
- "Loomalaulud" (1987)
- "Peegliplika" (1989); ISBN 5450003676
- "Mägra maja" (2007); ISBN 9789985716366
- "Kõrv peos" (2010); ISBN 9789985710692
- "Mida tähed räägivad?" (2018), ISBN 978-9949-549-80-1
