= Elizabeth G. Volkonskaia =

Russian noble and courtier (1838–1897)

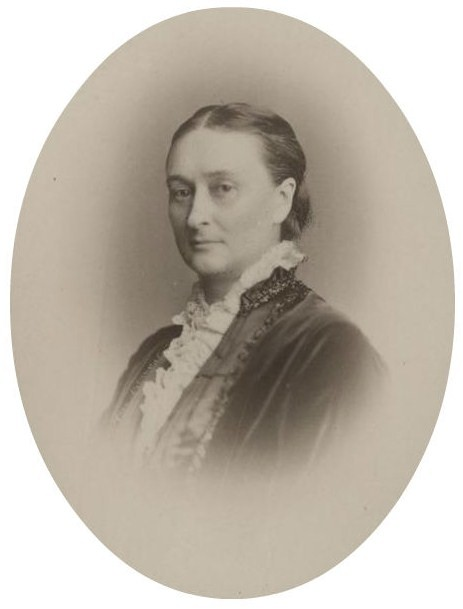
Elizabeth G. Volkonskaia

Elizabeth Grigoryevna Volkonskaia (31 October [O.S. 19 October] 1838 – 27 February 1897) was a Russian Empire noble and courtier. She played a leading role within the Catholic movement in Russia and has been referred to as the first woman in Russia to conduct serious historical theological studies.

Her children were Sergei Mikhailovitch Volkonsky, Peter Volkonsky, Alexandr Volkonsky and Vladimir Volkonsky.
