= Franco Petracchi =

Italian double bass soloist and teacher (born 1937)

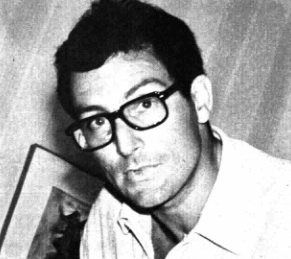
Franco Petracchi, 1972

Franco Petracchi (born September, 1937) is an Italian double bass soloist and teacher. He is a native of Pistoia, Tuscany, and the author of Simplified Higher Technique. In his method, he introduces some conventions to playing in the thumb-position. He uses names chromatic, semi-chromatic and diatonic for different hand positions. He plays a Gaetano Rossi bass, which is unusually large for a soloist.
