= Émile Jaques-Dalcroze =

Swiss composer, musician, and educator (1865–1950)

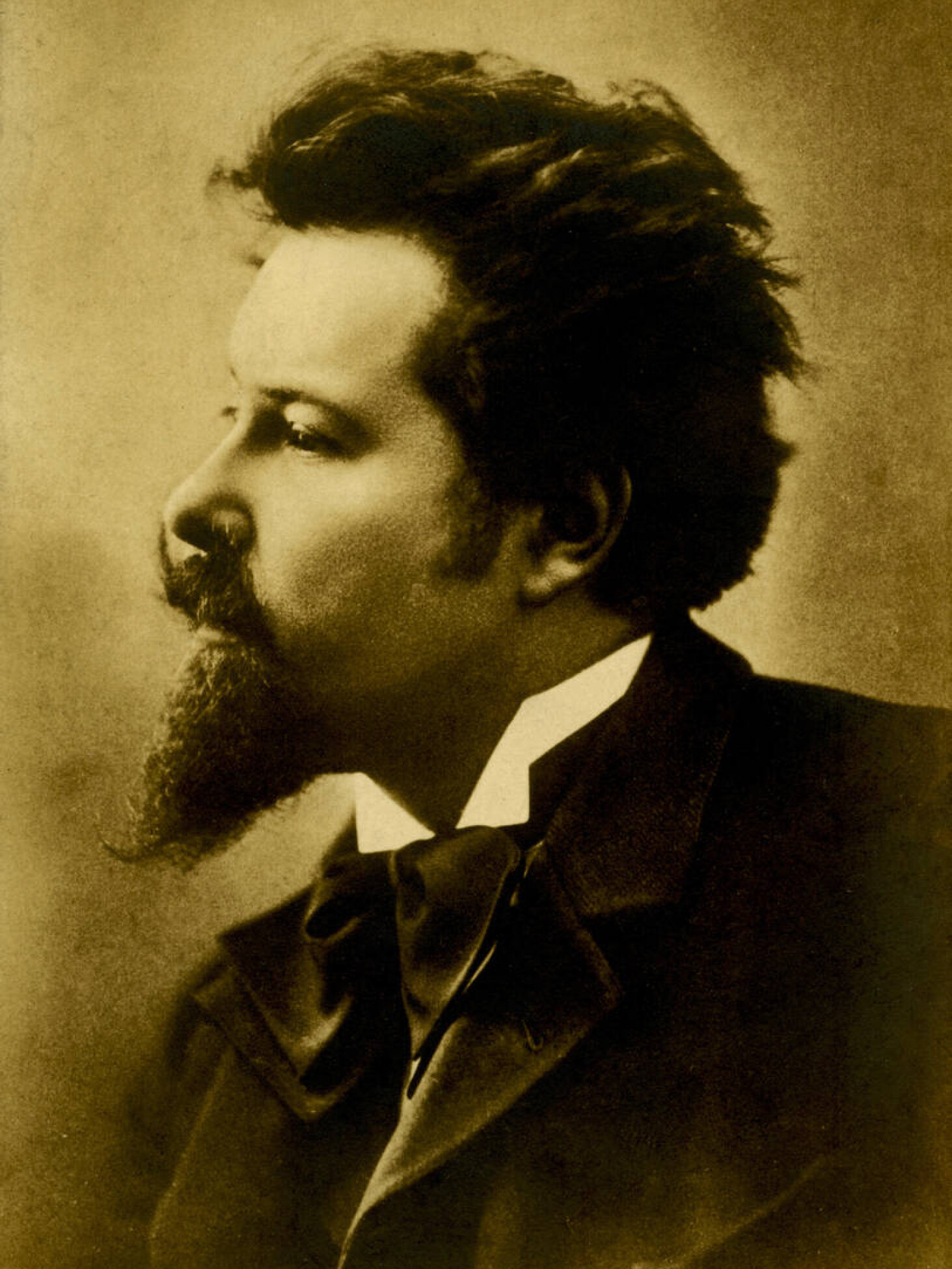
- Pre-1912 image of Dalcroze
- Born: Émile Henri Jaques; 6 July 1865; Vienna, Austrian Empire
- Died: 1 July 1950 (aged 84); Geneva, Switzerland
- Occupations: Composer; musician; educator
- Known for: Dalcroze eurhythmics

Émile Jaques-Dalcroze (6 July 1865 – 1 July 1950) was a Swiss composer, musician, and music educator who developed Dalcroze eurhythmics, an approach to learning and experiencing music through movement. Dalcroze eurhythmics influenced Carl Orff's pedagogy, used in music education throughout the United States.

Dalcroze's method teaches musical concepts, often through movement. The variety of movement analogues used for musical concepts develop an integrated and natural musical expression in the student. Turning the body into a well-tuned musical instrument—Dalcroze felt—was the best path for generating a solid, vibrant musical foundation. The Dalcroze method consists of three equally important elements: eurhythmics, solfège, and improvisation. Together, according to Dalcroze, they comprise the essential training of a complete musician. In an ideal approach, elements from each subject coalesce, resulting in an approach to teaching rooted in creativity and movement.

Dalcroze began his career as a pedagogue at the Geneva Conservatory in 1892, where he taught harmony and solfège. It was in his solfège courses that he began testing many of his influential and revolutionary pedagogical ideas. Between 1903 and 1910, Dalcroze had begun giving public presentations of his method. In 1910, with the help of German industrialist Wolf Dohrn, Dalcroze founded a school at Hellerau, outside Dresden, dedicated to the teaching of his method. Many musicians flocked to Hellerau, among them Prince Serge Wolkonsky, Vera Alvang (Griner), Valeria Cratina, Jelle Troelstra (son of Pieter Jelles Troelstra), Inga and Ragna Jacobi, Albert Jeanneret (Le Corbusier's brother), Jeanne de Salzmann, Mariam Ramberg, Anita Berber, Gertrude Price Wollner, and Placido de Montelio. With the outbreak of World War I in 1914, the school was abandoned. After the Second World War, his ideas were taken up as "music and movement" in British schools.

== Biography ==
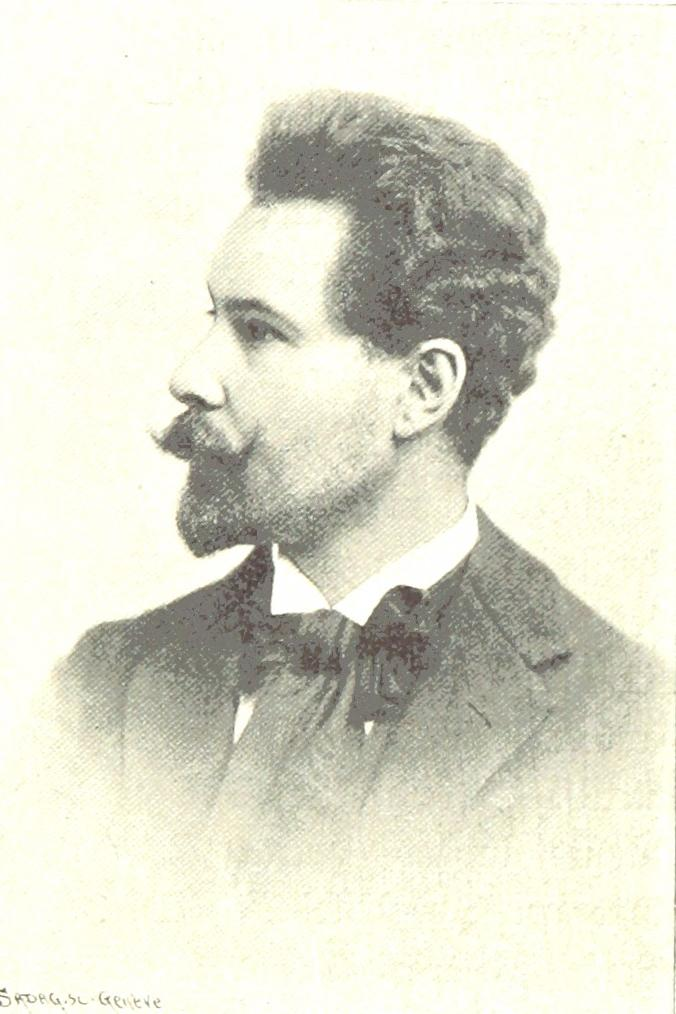

Émile Henri Jaques was born in Vienna in 1865. He later adopted the name Émile Jaques-Dalcroze. His mother, Julie Jaques, was a music teacher, so he was in contact with music since his childhood; while his father was a salesman of Swiss clocks. Influenced by his mother, Dalcroze formally began his musical studies in his early years. When he was 10 years old, his family moved to Geneva, Switzerland, and in 1877, Dalcroze joined the Conservatoire de Musique. He also studied at the College of Geneva, which he did not appreciate. Dalcroze considered the college as a "prison" where education was basically rules, which were not concerned about the students' interests.

In 1881, he was part of the Belles-Lettres Literary Society, a student group dedicated to acting, writing, and performing music, theatre, and opera. At that time, Dalcroze felt more interested in composing. In 1884, he studied composition with Léo Delibes and Gabriel Fauré. Around the same year, he studied acting with leading players of the Comédie-Française. Further on, he studied composition with Mathis Lussy, which influenced him in the process of rhythmic development. By the year 1886, he was the assistant conductor in Argelia, where he discovered Arab folk music. In contact with this kind of music, Dalcroze noticed that there were different worlds of rhythmic expression, each of which would require a particular way of writing, as well as a unique performance style. Accordingly, he developed a new kind of music notation. In 1887, he went to the Conservatory of Vienna, where he studied with Anton Bruckner.

Dalcroze was appointed Professor of Harmony at the Conservatoire de Musique de Genève in 1892, at the age of 27, but in 1910, he left and established his own school in Hellerau, near Dresden. Many great exponents of modern dance in the twentieth century spent time at the school, including Kurt Jooss and Hanya Holm, Rudolf Laban, Marie Rambert, Uday Shankar, and Mary Wigman. In 1911, Dalcroze and his students were invited by Prince Sergei Volkonsky to show their work in St. Petersburg and Moscow, establishing eurhythmics at the Moscow Art Theatre and inspiring Stanislavski's "tempo-rhythm". His work was part of the music event in the art competition at the 1912 Summer Olympics.

Dalcroze returned to Geneva in 1914 and opened the Institut Jaques-Dalcroze, which continues to provide professional training to the present day. The work established at Hellerau was moved to Helleray Laxenburg, near Vienna, in 1920. However, this school was closed with the rise of the Nazis. Dalcroze died in Geneva on 1 July 1950.

== Educational philosophy ==
In his search for a more intense rhythmic experience, Dalcroze posed some questions. First, he questioned why music theory and notation were taught as abstractions, dissociated from sound, movements, and feelings that they represented. Moreover, by taking the pianist as an example, he asked how the finger technique taught by professors could be considered a complete musical education. Finally, he was intrigued that the qualities that characterize a real musician were rarely experienced in a music class.

Dalcroze believed the first instrument that must be trained in music is the body. He developed techniques that combined hearing with a physical response, transferring to a physical response in singing and reading music. He did many experiments with his students, used to help in the process of learning and feeling music. His main goal was to develop the inner ear to facilitate musical thinking, reading, and writing music without the help of an instrument. While continuing to build his methodology, he observed his students and noticed that those who could not play in time in the music world were able to walk in time in the real world. The walking was completely spontaneous and easy. He observed that some of his best students could tap the beat using their feet or shake their heads and bodies in response to music. This physical response was natural and common to all ages and cultures.

Moreover, he noticed that students would change their movements when following a crescendo, and would respond physically to the accents of the music. They also relaxed their muscles with the endings of phrases. As they seemed to hear the music, feeling its effects, he concluded that the students themselves were the instruments, not the piano.

== Dalcroze eurhythmics ==
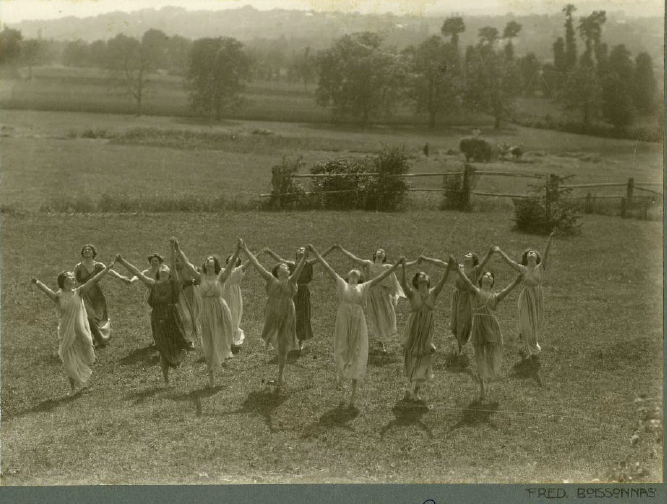
Students of Jacques-Dalcroze at Le Grand-Saconnex in 1909, photographed by Frédéric Boissonnas

Dalcroze noticed that students had a mechanical understanding instead of a musical comprehension. They were not able to hear harmonies that they wrote in the music theory classes, and they could not create simple melodies and chord sequences. This resulted in a lack of musical sensitivity that caused problems in the performance. His aim was to find ways to help students to develop skills to feel, hear, create, imagine, connect, memorize, read, and write, as well as perform and interpret music. He worked in order to free his students from the conflicts between mind and body, feeling and expression.

Dalcroze realized that the aspects of music that are more connected to the senses are rhythm and movement. Regarding the three elements of music, pitch, rhythm, and dynamic, he recognized that the last two were entirely dependent on movement. He also found their best models in the muscular system. For him, all degrees of time (tempi) can be experienced, understood, and expressed through the body. He felt that the enthusiasm of musical feelings depended on the sharpness of physical sensations. He was convinced that the combination of intense listening and the responses of the body would generate and release a powerful musical force.

Dalcroze needed a laboratory to test his theories. By working with students, he decided to hire his own workspace. He started to look for principles, teaching strategies, teaching styles, and methods that could convert music into a practical educational tool. The principles and methods which he developed were unique and new, so he gave them a special name: eurhythmics.

In the beginning, Dalcroze thought that the solution to many problems would be teaching musicians to contract and relax in a specific time (the speed of sound or time), in a specific space (the duration of a sound), and with a particular force (energy dynamics of a sound). Thus, he worked on a new series of exercises designed to help students strengthen their perception by the metric and its instincts by many streams of the movement, called rhythm. Then, he began to propose exercises by playing music and suggesting that students walk as they would feel the pulse. Surprisingly, students acted differently and had difficulties in different tempos. Therefore, he deduced that people still had trouble reaching the goal of speed, accuracy, and performance by being rhythmically expressive. He realized that there could be some system of quick communication between the brain, which understands and analyzes, and the muscles that perform.

=== Objectives ===
1. Mental and emotional: awareness, concentration, social integration, realization, and expression of nuances.
2. Physical: to make the performance easier, to make the performance accurate, to develop personal expressiveness through the performance.
3. Musical: quickness, precision, comfort, expressive personal response to the listening, analysis, writing, and improvisation.

Dalcroze Eurhythmics practices 3 concepts:

- Eurhythmics – Musical expression through movement; developing musical skills through kinetic exercises. The students can learn rhythm and structure by listening to music and expressing what they hear through spontaneous bodily movement.
- Solfège – Helps develop ear-training and sight-singing skills. Dalcroze utilized a fixed tonic (fixed-do) solfége system believing that all children can eventually develop perfect pitch.
- Improvisation – Using instruments, movement, and voice.

=== Techniques ===
In 1905, Dalcroze organized thousands of games and exercises by connecting beautiful music, intense listening, and consciously improvised movement. According to him, the professor must be able to improvise the songs for the activities in the music class.

The motions approached by Dalcroze were: movements, postures, and gestures to express the tempo, duration, dynamics, accents, and other elements that produce rhythmic material.

=== Methods and exercises ===
- 12 kleine melodische und rhythmische Studien, for piano (Berlin: Simrock, 1913)
- 16 plastische Studien, for piano (Berlin: Simrock, 1913)
- 20 Caprices and Rhythmic Studies, for piano (London: Augener, 1920)
- 50 Études miniatures de métrique et rythmique, for piano (Paris: Sénart, 1923)
- 10 mehrstimmige Gesänge ohne Worte zu plastischen Studien (Berlin: Simrock)
- 3 Vocalises (Paris: Heugel)
- 6 Exercices pratiques d'intonation (Lausanne: Foetisch)
- 6 Jeux rythmiques pour enfants et adolescents pour le piano (Paris: Heugel)
- 6 Petites pièces en rythmes alternés, for piano (Lausanne: Foetisch)
- Esquisses rythmiques, for piano (Lausanne: Foetisch)
- Exercices de disordination, for piano (Paris: Enoch)
- La Jolie musique, jeux et exercices pour les tout petits, for voice (Le Locle: Huguenin)
- Marches rythmigues, for voice and piano (Lausanne: Foetisch)
- Métrique et rythmique, 200 études, for piano (Paris: Lemoine
- Moderne Tonleiterschule (with R. Ruynemann) (London: Chester)
- Petites pièces de piano avec instruments à percussion (Paris: Enoch)
- Rythmes de chant et de danse, for voice and piano (Paris: Heugel)

=== Notable students ===
- Eliška Bláhová
- Milča Mayerová
- Jarmila Kröschlová

== Publications ==
- Vorschläge zur Reform des musicalischen Schulunterrichts. Gealto Hugurich, 1905 (5pp., also printed here)
- La Rythmique (2 volumes) (Lausanne: Foetisch, 1906 and 1918)
- La Portée musicale (Lausanne: Foetisch)
- Les Gammes et les tonalités, le phrasé et les nuances (3 volumes) (Lausanne: Foetisch, 1907)
- La Bonne Chanson, in: "Gazette Musicale de la Suisse Romande", 1 November 1894
- La Plastique animée (Lausanne: Foetisch)
- La Respiration et l'innervation musculaire (Lausanne: Foetisch, 1907)
- Le Rythme, la musique et l'éducation (Paris, 1920 and 1935); as Rhythmus, Musik et Erziehung (Basel: Benno Schwabe, 1922)
- Souvenirs. Notes et critiques (Neuchâtel: Attinger, 1942)
- La Musique et nous. Notes de notre double vie (Geneva: Perret-Gentil, 1945)
- Notes bariolées (Geneva: Jeheber, 1948)
