= Serge Wolkonsky =

Russian drama teacher (1860–1937)

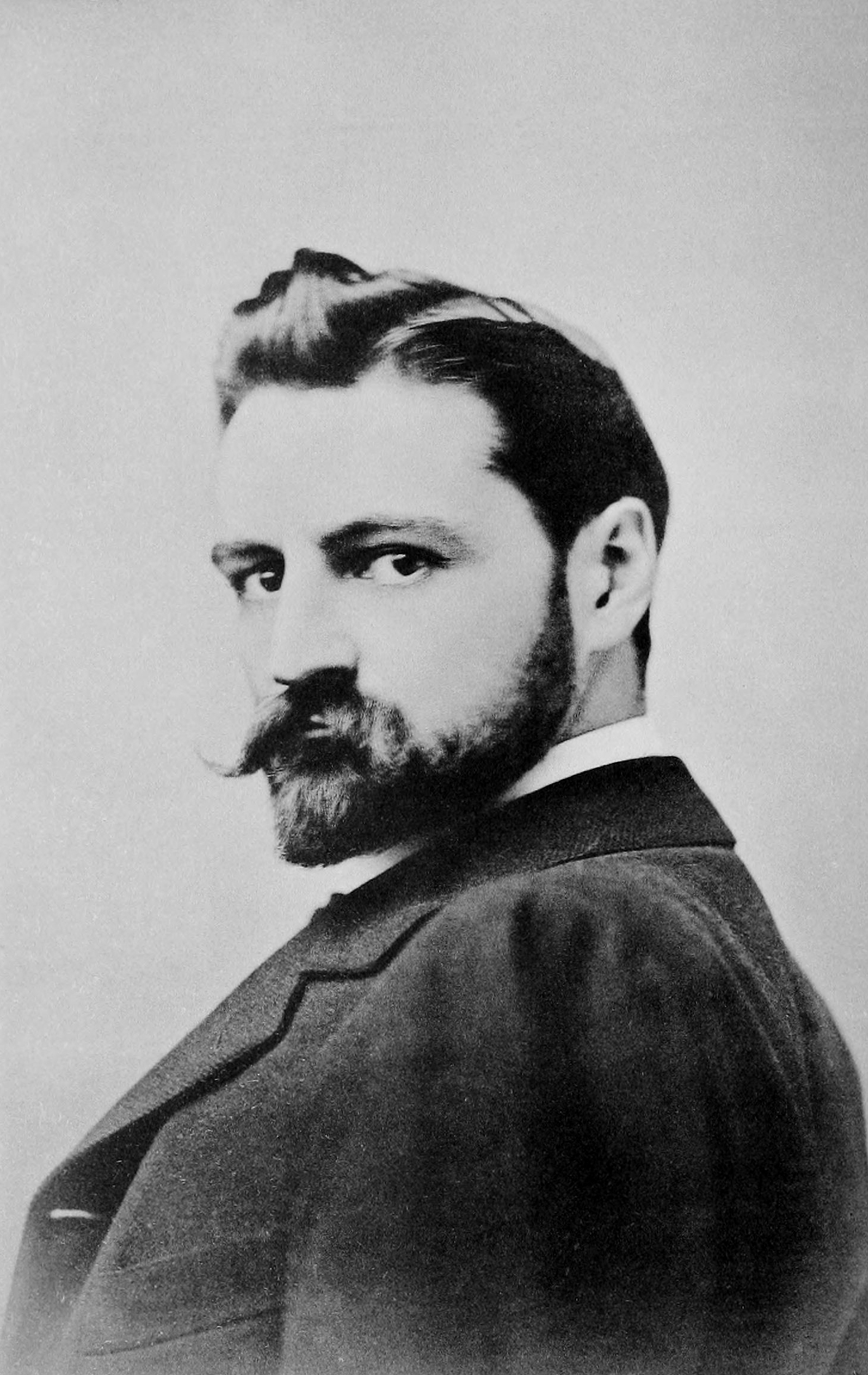
- Born: May 4, 1860; Lääne-Harju Parish, Governorate of Estonia, Russian Empire
- Died: August 25, 1937 (aged 77); Hot Springs, Virginia, U.S.
- Resting place: Hollywood Cemetery; Richmond, Virginia, U.S.

Prince Serge Wolkonsky (also referred to as Sergei Mikhailovitch Volkonsky; Russian: Серге́й Миха́йлович Волко́нский; 4 May 1860 – 25 October 1937) was an influential Russian theatrical worker, one of the first Russian proponents of eurhythmics, pupil and friend of Émile Jaques-Dalcroze, and creator of an original system of actor's training that included both expressive gesture and expressive speech.

== Biography ==
Wolkonsky was born on the Fall estate near Revel in Imperial Russia (now Tallinn, Estonia). His mother was Princess Elizaveta Grigorievna Volkonskaya, daughter of Grigory Petrovich Volkonsky (son of Sophia, a sister of Decembrist Sergei Volkonsky) and Mary (née Countess Benckendorff, daughter of Count Alexander Benckendorff).

Princess Volkonskaya profoundly influenced her son Serge, defining many of his interests, including his Orthodox religious views; among her friends was the well-known Russian philosopher, theologian and poet Vladimir Solovyov. Wolkonsky's father, Mikhail Sergeevich, was a son of Decembrist Sergei Volkonsky and Mary, née Raevskaya; his godfather was Pushkin's friend Ivan Pushchin, another Decembrist. From his birth, Michael was registered as a serf, and as the son of a deportee wasn't allowed to enter the university, but in 1855, just after the death of Emperor Nicholas I, he reached Russia from Siberia, and by the 1870s had become a member of the State Council.

Wolkonsky graduated from the philological faculty of St. Petersburg University in 1884. In the spring of 1893, he attended the World's Columbian Exposition in Chicago as an official representative of the Department of Public Instruction, and an article by him about it was published later on in Vestnik Evropy ("The European Bulletin"). Later that year he went on a world cruise before returning to Petersburg via Constantinople. In the mid-1890s, he delivered lectures on Russia at Cornell and Harvard.

During the reign of Tsar Alexander III Serge Volkonsky converted to Russian Greek Catholic Church from Russian Orthodoxy. In 1899, Wolkonsky became Director of the Imperial Theaters, the post for which he is most remembered. Although he held the position only until 1902, he achieved a great deal; Serge Diaghilev was his immediate assistant, and Wolkonsky entrusted him with the publication of the Annual of the Imperial Theaters in 1900. New names appeared in the theaters, such as painters Alexandre Benois, Konstantin Somov, and Léon Bakst. Wolkonsky was forced to send in his resignation after the conflict with Mathilde Kschessinskaya.

In 1910, he trained in and taught eurhythmics with Émile Jaques-Dalcroze, influencing Stanislavski's work on "tempo-rhythm", as well as the Delsarte method of gestures and movements, and he began to publish articles publicizing them in Russia. These works aroused the interest of Constantin Stanislavski, with whom he briefly collaborated. He set up a school and journal to propagate his ideas, but the advent of World War I in 1914 put an end to them, and he retired to his estate in Tambov province until 1918.

After the October Revolution he taught acting technique in Moscow for a time, but in the spring of 1919 he contracted typhus (as a result of which a premature obituary was published), and in August he was arrested by the Cheka. He was released and continued teaching and giving lectures, working for a time with Proletkult and Proletcult Theatre, but eventually he emigrated.

From February 1926, he lived in Paris, where he became a leading theatrical critic; he also continued teaching and giving lectures. "During this period of his life in Paris Wolkonsky became one of the most brilliant members of the Russian Emigration". He became the first director of established in 1931 Conservatoire Rachmaninoff in Paris. During this time he became "a close friend and associate of the poet Marina Tsvetaeva (who dedicated to him her cycle of poems 'The Disciple' and wrote an essay about his memoirs)."

In 1936, he was invited by the Kurt Jooss ballet school in London, after which he taught in the ballet company of Alicia Markova and Anton Dolin. In London, he met his future wife, Mary Walker Fearn, daughter of United States diplomat J. Walker Fearn and, by her first marriage, a sister-in-law of the former Mrs. Elsie French Vanderbilt. After the marriage, Prince and Princess Wolkonsky went to the United States, where, in Hot Springs, Virginia, he died after a brief illness at the Community House Hospital. "His health had been undermined by four years of teaching in Bolshevik schools." On 31 October, a requiem was held in a Catholic church, and "besides relatives there was all Russian Paris." He was buried in Hollywood Cemetery in Richmond, Virginia.

== Works ==
- Pictures of Russian History and Russian Literature. Boston, NY, London; Lamson, Wolffe & Co. 1st ed. 1897; Pictures…, (Lowell lectures), 1898
- Impressions: sketches of American life as observed by a Russian. Chicago, 1893
- My reminiscences (translated by A.E. Chamot). London: Hutchinson & Co, 2 vols, 1924
- "The Decembrists. The first Russian revolutionists," Thought, v.3, 1928

(For a full list please see Russian article.)

== See also ==
- Vera Griner

== Bibliography ==
- R.C.Beachem, "Appia, Jaques-Dalcroze and Hellerau," NTQ, v.1, N 2–3, 1985
- C.Bommeli, "Vera Griner," Le Rythme, Geneve, bull. 8–9, 1990–1991, p. 24-25
- Arnold L. Haskell. Diaghileff. His artistic and private life. — NY, 1935
- Matilda Kshessinskaya. Dancing in Petersburg — London, 1960, 1973; Souvenirs de la Kshessinskaya. — Paris, 1960.
- Mary Trofimov, "The Last Days of Prince Serge Wolkonsky)," Theatrical Life, Moscow, N 20, 1991, p. 31 (in Russian)

(For a full list please see Russian article.)
