= SS Pompeji =

History
- Name: Pompeji (1939-45); Empire Blackwater (1945-49); Krusaa (1949-60); Krucia (1960-69); Helvi (1969-71); Eastern Faith (1971-75)
- Owner: Deutsche Levante Linie, Hamburg (1939-42); Bick, Godeffroy & Co (1942-45); Ministry of War Transport (1945); Ministry of Transport (1945-46); United States Maritime Commission (1946-47); Seatrade Corporation (1947-49); Dampskibs Hetland A/S (1949-57); Dampskibs Pacific A/S (1957-60); AB Krucia Shipping O/Y (1960-67); AB Vasa Shipping O/Y (1967-69); Rederi Ab Nidarholm Laivanvarustamo (1969-71); South East Navigation Corporation (1971-75)
- Operator: Deutsche Levante Linie, Hamburg (1939-42); Bick, Godeffroy & Co (1942-45); P Carrick & Co Ltd (1945-46); United States Maritime Commission (1946-47); Seatrade Corporation (1947-49); Basse & Co, Copenhagen (1949-60); Nils Berg, Finland (1960-69); H Hayrynen O/Y, Finland (1969-71); Nan Sing Navigation Co, Taiwan (1971-75)
- Port of registry: (Nazi Germany) Hamburg (1939-45); (United Kingdom) London (1945-46); (United States) New York (1946-49); (Denmark) Copenhagen (1949-60); (Finland) Vaasa (1960-69); (Finland) Turku (1969-71); Panama City (1971-75)
- Builder: Flensburger Schiffbau, Flensburg
- Yard number: 450
- Launched: 11 October 1939
- Completed: February 1940
- Out of service: 30 July 1975
- Identification: UK official number 180776 (1945-46); call sign DKCM (1940-45); call sign GZRM (1945-46); Finnish official number 206 (1960-69); Finnish official number 1642 (1969-71); IMO number 5197121 (1960-75)
- Fate: Scrapped August 1975

General characteristics
- Tonnage: 2,917 GRT; 1,658 NRT
- Length: 340.3 ft (103.7 m)
- Beam: 52.7 ft (16.1 m)
- Depth: 18.7 ft (5.7 m)
- Propulsion: 1 × screw; 1 × triple-expansion engine; 1 × exhaust turbine
- Speed: 12 knots (22 km/h)

Pompeji was a 2,917 GRT cargo ship which was built in 1939 by Flensburger Schiffbau-Gesellschaft, Flensburg, Germany. She was seized as a war prize in 1945 and renamed Empire Blackwater. Ownership passed to the British Ministry of War Transport (MoWT) and then the United States Maritime Commission (USMC). In 1949 she was sold to a Danish company and renamed Krusaa. She was sold in 1960 to a Finnish company and renamed Krucia and later Helvi. In 1969 she was sold to a Panamanian company and renamed Eastern Faith. She was scrapped in 1975.

== Description ==
It was a 2,917 GRT cargo ship built by Flensburger Schiffbau Geschellshaft, Flensburg, as yard number 450. Launched as Pompeji on 11 October 1939, it was completed in February 1940. Principle dimensions were 140.2 m (460 ft) in length overall, 103.02 m (338.0 ft) at the waterline, a 16.1 m (52.7 ft) beam and a mean draft of 5.7 m (18.7 ft). The main engine was a three-cylinder triple-expansion engine built by Flensburger Schiffbau. Exhaust steam from the low-pressure cylinder drove a low-pressure turbine, which in turn drove the single propeller shaft and screw via a fluid coupling and double-reduction gearing. This combination gave the ship a speed of 12 knots (22 km/h).

== Career ==
=== Pompeji ===
Pompeji was built for Deutsche Levante Linie AG, Hamburg, which was her port of registry. In 1942, she was sold to Bick, Godeffroy & Co, Hamburg. Pompeji was seized as a war prize in Kiel in 1945.

=== Empire Blackwater ===
Ownership passed to the MoWT and the ship was renamed Empire Blackwater. Her port of registry was changed to London. Empire Blackwater was operated under the management of P Carrick & Co Ltd. The MoWT ceased to exist during 1945, becoming the Ministry of Transport. In March 1946, Empire Blackwater was awarded to the United States as a war prize, with an estimated value of $288,000. She transferred to the USMC and her port of registry changed to New York. On 21 October 1946, Empire Blackwater was laid up in the Hudson River. On 25 March 1947, she was sold to Seatrade Corporation for $216,000.

=== Krusaa ===
In 1949, Empire Blackwater was sold to Dampskibs Hetland AS, Denmark and renamed Krusaa. Her port of registry was changed to Copenhagen. Krusaa was operated under the management of Basse & Co, Copenhagen. In 1957, Krusaa was sold to Dampskibs Pacific AS.

=== Krucia ===
In 1960, Krusaa was sold to AB Krucia O/Y, Finland and renamed Krucia. Her port of registry was changed to Vaasa. She was operated under the management of Nils Berg. In 1967, Krucia was sold to AB Vasa Shipping O/Y.

=== Helvi ===
In 1969, Krusaa was sold to Rederi AB Nidarholm Laivanvarustamo and renamed Helvi. Her port of registry was changed to Turku. Helvi was operated under the management of H Hayrynen O/Y.

=== Eastern Faith ===
In 1969, Helvi was sold to the South East Navigation Corporation, Panama and renamed Eastern Faith. Her port of registry was Panama City. She was operated by the Nan Sing Navigation Co, Taiwan. Eastern Faith was scrapped in August 1975 by the Chi Shun Hwa Steel Co Ltd, Kaohsiung, Taiwan. She arrived for scrapping on 30 July 1975.

== Official numbers and call signs ==
Official numbers were a forerunner to IMO numbers. Empire Blackwater had the UK official number 180776. Krucia had the Finnish official number 206 and Helvi had the Finnish official number 1462. Krucia, Helvi and Eastern Faith had the IMO number 5197121.

Pompeji used the call sign DKCM. Empire Blackwater used the call sign GZRM.
