= Dalcroze eurhythmics =

Developmental approach for teaching music

Dalcroze eurhythmics, also known as the Dalcroze method or simply eurhythmics, is a developmental approach to music education. Eurhythmics was developed in the early 20th century by Swiss musician and educator Émile Jaques-Dalcroze and has influenced later music education methods, including the Kodály method, Orff Schulwerk and Suzuki Method. Dalcroze eurhythmics teaches concepts of rhythm, structure, and musical expression through movement. This focus on body-based learning is the concept for which Dalcroze eurhythmics is best known. It focuses on allowing the student to gain physical awareness and experience of music through training that takes place through all of the senses, particularly kinesthetic.

Eurhythmics often introduces a musical concept through movement before the students learn about its visual representation. This sequence translates to heightened body awareness and an association of rhythm with a physical experience for the student, reinforcing concepts kinesthetically. Eurhythmics has wide-ranging applications and benefits and can be taught to a variety of age groups. Eurhythmics classes for all ages share a common goal – to provide the music student with a solid rhythmic foundation through movement in order to enhance musical expression and understanding.

== Émile Jaques-Dalcroze and the origins of eurhythmics ==
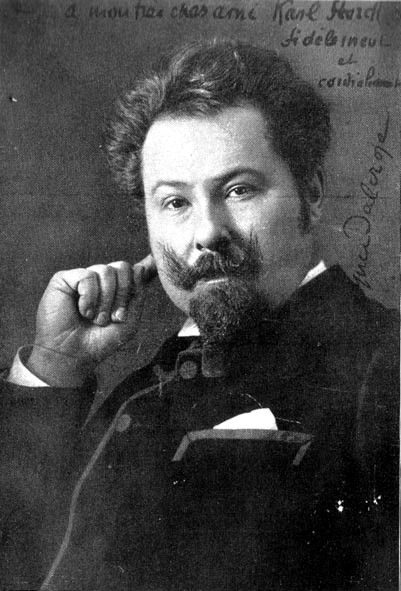
Émile Jaques-Dalcroze

Jaques-Dalcroze was appointed Professor of Harmony at the Conservatoire of Geneva in 1892, early in his career. As he taught his classes, he noticed that his students deeply needed an approach to learning music that included a kinesthetic component. He believed that in order to enhance and maximize musical expression, students needed to be trained early on to listen and appreciate music using both their minds and bodies. This coordination of mind and physical instincts formed the basis of his method.

Ready to develop and employ an improved, integrated style of music education at the Conservatoire, Dalcroze discovered some obstacles. He found that students with innate rhythmic abilities were rare, just as are those with absolute, or "perfect," pitch. In response to his observations, he asserted that in order to develop rhythmic ability in his students, he must first, and as early as possible in their development, train them in exercises that utilized the entire body. Only when the student's muscles and motor skills were developed could they be properly equipped to interpret and understand musical ideas. As he mentioned in the foreword of his "Rhythm, Music, and Education," he sought the "connection between instincts for pitch and movement ... time and energy, dynamics, and space, music and character, music and temperament, [and] finally the art of music and the art of dancing.”

Because of the nature of his goals in expanding music education, his ideas are readily applicable to young students. An objective of his was to "musicalize" young children in order to prepare them for musical expression in future instrumental studies. He believed exposure to music, an expanded understanding of how to listen, and the training of gross and fine motor skills would yield faster progress later on in students’ musical studies. Related to this was his goal to sow the seeds of musical appreciation for future generations.

As stated concisely by Claire-Lise Dutoit in her "Music Movement Therapy," successful eurhythmics lessons have the following three attributes in common:

“The vital enjoyment of rhythmic movement and the confidence that it gives; the ability to hear, understand and express music in movement; [and] the call made on the pupil to improvise and develop freely his own ideas.”

== Influences on the development of eurhythmics ==
Before taking a post teaching theory, Émile Jaques-Dalcroze spent a year as a conductor in Algiers, where he was exposed to a rhythmic complexity that helped influence him to pay special attention to rhythmic aspects of music.

Jaques-Dalcroze also had an important friendship with Édouard Claparède, the psychologist. In particular, their collaboration resulted in eurhythmics often employing games of change and quick reaction in order to focus attention and increase learning.

== Current applications ==
General education

Eurhythmics classes are often offered as an addition to general education programs, whether in preschools, grade schools, or secondary schools. In this setting, the objectives of eurhythmics classes are to introduce students with a variety of musical backgrounds to musical concepts through movement without a specific performance-related goal.

For younger students, eurhythmics activities often imitate play. Games include musical storytelling, which associates different types of music with corresponding movements of the characters in a story. The youngest of students, who are typically experiencing their first exposure to musical knowledge in a eurhythmics class, learn to correlate types of notes with familiar movement; for example the quarter note is represented as a "walking note." As they progress, their musical vocabulary is expanded and reinforced through movement.

Performance-based applications

While eurhythmics classes can be taught to general populations of students, they are also effective when geared toward music schools, either preparing students to begin instrumental studies or serving as a supplement to students who have already begun musical performance.

== Aspects of a rhythmic curriculum ==
Vocabulary

Eurhythmics classes for students in elementary school through college and beyond can benefit from a rhythmic curriculum that explores rhythmic vocabulary. This vocabulary can be introduced and utilized in a number of different ways, but the primary objective of this component is to familiarize students with rhythmic possibilities and expand their horizons. Activities such as rhythmic dictation, composition, and the performance of rhythmic canons and polyrhythms can accommodate a wide range of meters and vocabulary. In particular, vocabulary can be organized according to number of subdivisions of the pulse.

Movement

A key component of a rhythmic education, movement provides another way of reinforcing rhythmic concepts - kinesthetic learning serves as a supplement to visual and aural learning. While the study of traditional classroom music theory reinforces concepts visually and encourages students to develop aural skills, the study of eurhythmics solidifies these concepts through movement. In younger students, the movement aspect of a rhythmic curriculum also develops musculature and gross motor skills. Ideally, most activities that are explored in eurhythmics classes should include some sort of kinesthetic reinforcement.

Meter and Syncopation

Another element of a rhythmic curriculum is the exploration of meter and syncopation. In particular, the study of meter should incorporate an organization of pulses and subdivisions. This organization can be expressed in a "meter chart," which can include both equal-beat and unequal-beat meters.

The study of syncopation, a broad term that can involve a variety of rhythms that fall unexpectedly or somehow displace the pulse, is also essential in a rhythmic education. Eurhythmics classes can incorporate various activities to explore syncopation, including complex rhythmic dictations, the performance of syncopated rhythms, the exploration of syncopated rhythms in canon, and a general discussion of syncopated vocabulary.

== Effectiveness of Dalcroze eurhythmics ==
A group of 72 pre-school children were tested on their rhythmic ability; half of the children had free play (35–40 min.) twice a week for a 10-week period while the other half had rhythmic movement classes for the same amount of time. The group that had classes (experimental group) did significantly better than the group that just had free play (control group). The experiment group scored four or more points better in every area tested than the control group in the final test. This shows that eurhythmic classes can benefit a child’s sense of rhythm.

== See also ==
- Eurythmy
- Gurdjieff movements

== Bibliography ==
- Hansen, Kristen S., "A Musical Game for Every Age-Group." Teaching Music, Vol. 9 Issue 1. EBSCOhost. UWEC McIntyre Library Eau Claire WI. Dec. 1 2006
- Mead, Virginia Hoge, "More than Mere Movement: Dalcroze Eurhythmics." Music Educators Journal Feb 1986 v72 n6 p42-46 ERIC EBSCOhost. UWEC McIntyre Library, Eau Claire, WI. 1 December 2006
- Johnson, Monica Dale, "Dalcroze Skills of All Teachers", Music Educators Journal. ERIC. EBSCOhost. UWEC McIntyre Library, Eau Claire, WI 1 December 2006
- Swaiko, Nancy. "The Role and Value of a Eurhythmics Program in a Curriculum of Deaf Children." American Annals of the Deaf Jun74 119, 3, 321-4. ERIC. EBSCOhost. UWEC McIntyre Library, Eau Claire, WI. 1 December 2006.
- Waller, Johnny, and Steve Rapport. Sweet Dreams: the Definitive Biography of Eurythmics. Toronto: Stoddart, 1985. ISBN 0-7737-5026-6
- Jaques-Dalcroze, Emile. Rhythm, Music & Education. London & Whitstable: The Riverside Press Ltd., 1967. (First published 1921)
- Findlay, Elsa. Rhythm and Movement: Applications of Dalcroze Eurhythmics. Evanston: Summy-Birchard Company, 1971.
- Bachmann, Marie-Laure. Dalcroze Today: an Education through and into Music. Oxford: Clarendon Press, 1991.
- Dutoit, Claire-Lise. Music Movement Therapy. London: The Riverside Press Ltd, 1965.
- Jaques-Dalcroze, Emile. Eurhythmics Art and Education. London: Chatto & Windus, 1930.
