= Peter Volkonsky =

Russian aristocrat (1861–1948)

Prince Peter Mikhailovich Volkonsky (Russian: Пётр Михайлович Волконский; 29 September [O.S. 17 September] 1861 – 11 September 1948) was a Russian aristocrat. He was born into the prominent Volkonsky family in St. Petersburg, and he became active in charitable organizations during World War I. Volkonsky was an advocate for efforts toward reconciliation between the Russian Orthodox and Catholic Churches. After the February Revolution, he lived in exile in Istanbul and later in Western Europe, where he converted to Catholicism and was later ordained a Catholic priest.

== Biography ==
Peter M. Volkonsky was born in 1861 in St. Petersburg. His father was Prince Michael S. Volkonsky, his mother the Serene Princess Elizabeth G. Volkonskaia (1838–1897). He married Princess Catherine Shahovskaya, daughter of the General of Infantry Prince Shakhovsky Aleksei Ivanovich (1821–1890) and Sofia Alexandrovna Olsufyeva (1830–1882). Their son was Prince Mikhail Petrovich Volkonsky. He also had three brothers: Vladimir Volkonsky (1868–1953), who was vice-chairman of the State Duma and Deputy Minister of Internal Affairs, Serge Volkonsky (1860–1937) who was a director, writer, and Privy Counsellor, and Alexandr Volkonsky (1866–1934) who was a marshal of the nobility of the Balashov district of Tambov province.

In 1881, he graduated from the Larin Gymnasium in St. Petersburg. During World War I he served on the front as a volunteer for the All-Russian Zemstvo Union. During this time, he also helped found the Petrograd Society and advocated for the reunification of Catholic and Orthodox churches prior to the February Revolution

=== Post February Revolution ===
After the revolution, he fled to Istanbul, where he spent his life in exile. In Istanbul, he converted to Catholicism. From 1931 to 1937, he worked in the archives of the Catholic Metropolitan Andrey Sheptytsky.

At the end of life, he was ordained a Catholic priest. He also authored books on Catholicism, such as "Catholicism and the sacred tradition of the East", among others.

He died 11 September 1948 in Paris.
