= Alexander Volkonsky =

Russian prince (1866–1934)

Alexander Mikhailovich Volkonsky

Personal details
- Born: 25 April 1866 St. Petersburg Governorate, Russian Empire
- Died: 18 October 1934 (aged 68) Rome, Kingdom of Italy
- Buried: Campo Verano
- Parents: Mikhail Sergeevich Volkonsky (father); Elizabeth G. Volkonskaia (mother)
- Education: St. Petersburg University

Prince Alexandr Mikhailovich Volkonsky (Russian: Александр Михайлович Волконский, 25 April 1866 – 18 October 1934) was a Russian General Staff officer, military attaché and writer, who in later life, was ordained a priest by the Bulgarian Greek Catholic Church.

== Biography ==
=== Education ===
Alexandr was born in the St. Petersburg Governorate. He graduated from St. Petersburg University. From 1889 he served as a volunteer at the Life Guard Cavalry Regiment. From June 1890, non-commissioned officer, with November 1890 – estandart-cadet. Passed the exam at the Nicholas Cavalry and Constantine Military School (1890). In 1890 made a cornet, 30 August 1894, a lieutenant.

He graduated from the two-year course at the Nicholas General Staff Academy (1896).

In 1895 he served in the Russian embassy to Persia, in 1897 he was posted to Beijing. He wrote a secret memo "On the need to strengthen our strategic position in the Far East", which pointed to inevitability of military conflict with Japan and the unpreparedness of Russia to such conflict.

In 1898 he was sent to Turkestan, taking part in the work of the Committee on measures of prevention of plague.

=== Staff Officer ===
Promoted to Captain in May 1900. He participated in the Chinese campaign of 1900-1901 as a staff officer. In September 1901 – October 1902 Volkonsky commanded 3rd Squadron of the Sumy Dragoons regiment.

From 1902 to 1906, he served in the General Staff in St. Petersburg. He published several articles and books on the current military situation.

=== Military attaché in Italy ===
In February 1908 Volkonsky was appointed Russian military attaché in Italy. Promoted to the rank of colonel in April 1908.

Aide-de-camp of Emperor Nicholas II. In 1912 he had to resign for political reasons.

During World War I, he returned to the active service with the rank of colonel. From 1915 to 1917 he was again appointed Russian military attaché to Rome.

=== Emigre ===
After the Bolshevik Revolution, he remained in Italy in exile. Maintained close ties with General Pyotr Wrangel. He authored several works, directed against the Ukrainian separatist movement, among them "The Ukraine question: The historic truth versus the separatist propaganda" (1920), published in Russian, English and French.

His other works were the "Name of Russia in the pre-Mongolian time" (1929), "What is the main danger?" (1929), "Little Russian and Ukrainian" (1929).

In 1930 he converted to the Catholic Faith from Russian Orthodoxy. On 6 July 1930 was ordained to the priesthood by Bulgarian Roman Catholic bishop, Exarch of Sofia Cyril Kurtev. He participated in the Congress of the Russian Catholic clergy in Rome (1930), on behalf of which he wrote historical and the dogmatic work "Catholicism and the Holy Tradition of the East " (Paris, 1933–1934). Volkonsky worked at the Pontifical Commission Pro Russia, which was responsible for all matters concerning Catholics of all rites inside the Soviet Union and Russians in the Diaspora, and as a teacher of Russian and other Slavic languages at the Pontifical Oriental Institute.

Volkonsky died on 18 October 1934 in Rome. He was buried in the crypt of the Greek College in Rome's Campo Verano cemetery (grave was not preserved).

== Works ==
- Wolkonsky, Alexandre. The Ukraine Question : The historic truth versus the separatist propaganda. Translated under the direction of William Gibson. Rome, 1920.
