= Conservatoire de Musique de Genève =

Music school in Geneva, Switzerland

Conservatoire de musique de Genève
- Conservatoire de musique de Genève
- Established: 1835; 191 years ago
- Students: ~2,500
- Location: Pl. de Neuve 5, 1204, Genève, 1204, Switzerland; 46.20°N 6.14°E
- Website: cmg.ch

The Conservatoire de musique de Genève is a music school in Geneva, Switzerland.

== History ==
Founded in September 1835 by François Bartholoni, it is the oldest music education institution in Switzerland and among the oldest in Europe.

Its current building, designed by Jean-Baptiste Lesueur, opened in 1858. Franz Liszt taught at this conservatory during the first year of its operation.

Since 2009, the Conservatoire’s professional courses have been led by the Geneva University of Music (Haute école de musique de Genève). The Conservatory hosts nearly 2,500 students.

The Geneva International Music Competition was founded in 1939 at the Conservatoire, and is its first international competition.

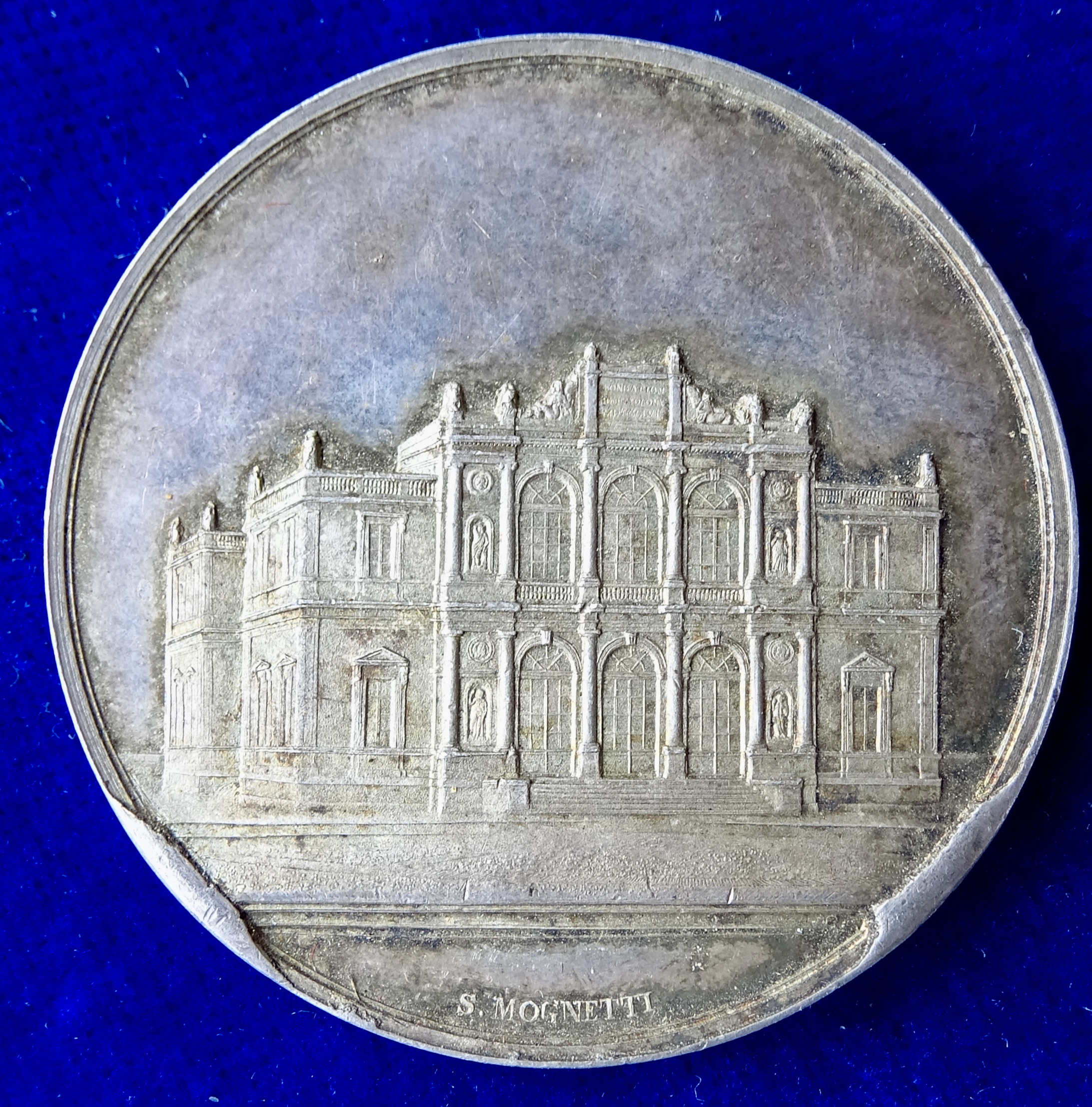
Swiss Conservatoire de Musique de Genève, award silver medal by Mognetti, obverse

== Directors ==
- Nathan Bloc (1835–1849)
- Jules Delacour (1849–1859)
- Ami Girard (1859–1892)
- Ferdinand Held (1892–1925)
- Henri Gagnebin (1925–1957)
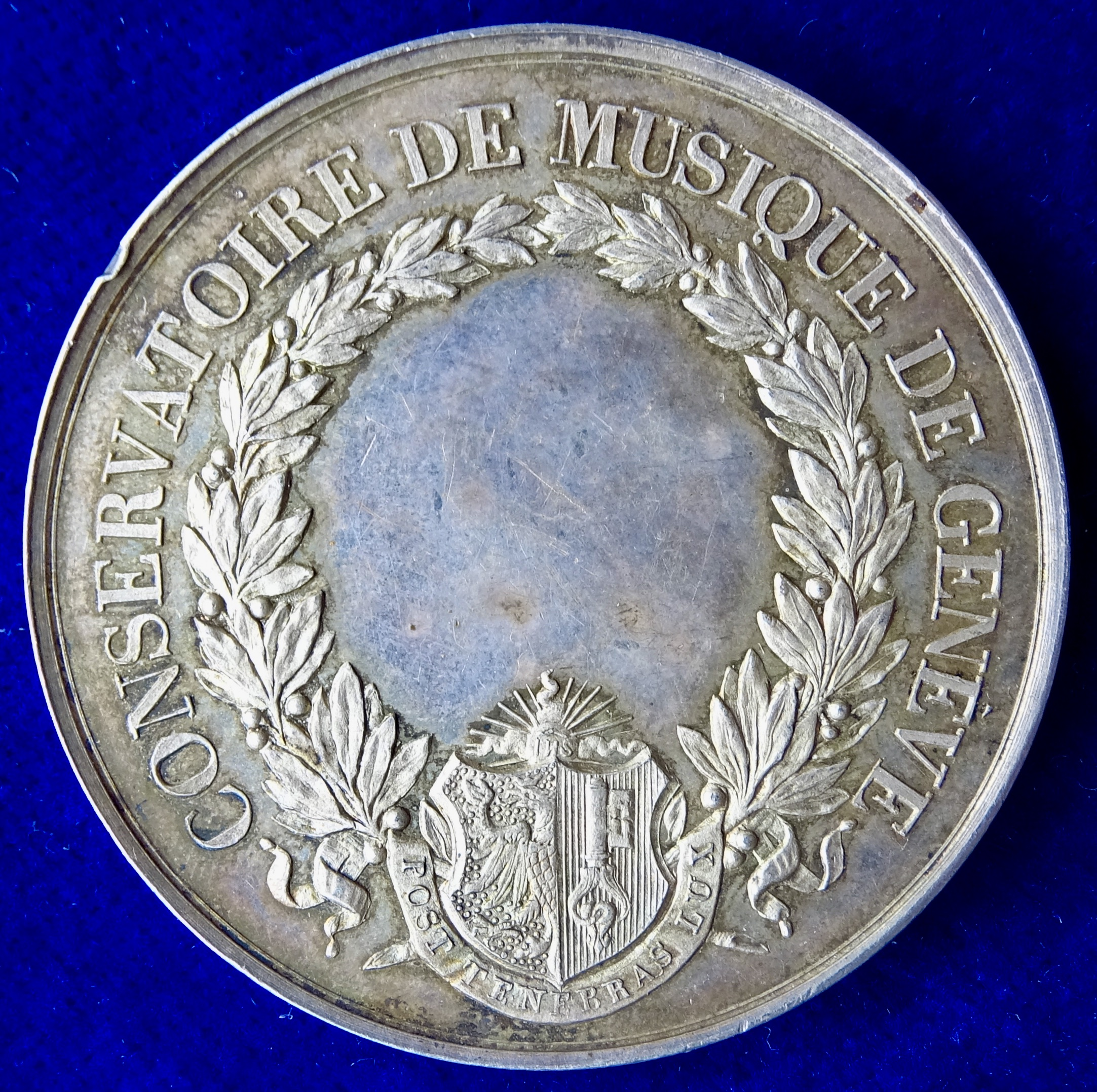
  The reverse of this medal
- Samuel Baud-Bovy (1957–1970)
- Claude Viala (1970–1992)
- Philippe Dinkel (1992–2007, continued as director of the Geneva University of Music until 2021)
- Eva Aroutounian (since 2007)

== Notable alumni ==
- Ofer Ben-Amots, composer
- Hugues Cuénod, operatic tenor
- Émile Jaques-Dalcroze, composer, musician and educator
- Edmond H. Fischer, biochemist
- Enrico Gatti, violinist
- Nelson Goerner, classical pianist
- Irène Jacob, actress
- Sébastian Jacot, flautist
- Michael Jarrell, composer and academic teacher
- John Keys, organist
- Esko Laine, double bassist and professor of music
- Thijs van Leer, lead vocalist and flautist of progressive rock band Focus
- Grégoire Maret, jazz harmonica player
- William Chapman Nyaho, musician
- Sophia Parnok, writer
- Katina Paxinou, actress
- Davoud Rashidi, actor
- Charles Reiner, pianist and music educator
- Lionel Rogg, organist, composer and teacher
- Andrei Volkonsky, composer and harpsichordist
