= 1957 New Year Honours =

British royal recognitions

The New Year Honours 1957 were appointments in many of the Commonwealth realms of Queen Elizabeth II to various orders and honours to reward and highlight good works by citizens of those countries. They were announced in supplements to the London Gazette of 28 December 1956 to celebrate the year passed and mark the beginning of 1957.

At this time honours for Australians were awarded both in the United Kingdom honours, on the advice of the premiers of Australian states, and also in a separate Australia honours list.

The recipients of honours are displayed here as they were styled before their new honour, and arranged by honour, with classes (Knight, Knight Grand Cross, etc.) and then divisions (Military, Civil, etc.) as appropriate.

== United Kingdom and Commonwealth ==
=== Baron ===
- The Right Honourable Sir Edward Bridges, GCB, GCVO, MC, Permanent Secretary, HM Treasury, and Official Head of Civil Service, 1945–1956.
- Sir Robert John Sinclair, KCB, KBE. For public services.

=== Privy Counsellors ===
- Sir Harry Braustyn Hylton Hylton-Foster, QC, MP, Member of Parliament for York since 1950, Solicitor-General since 1954.
- The Honourable Sir Robert Clarkson Tredgold, KCMG, Chief Justice, Federal Supreme Court, Federation of Rhodesia and Nyasaland.

=== Baronet ===
- Commander Peter Garnett Agnew, Royal Navy (Retd.), MP, Member of Parliament for Camborne, 1931–1950, and for Worcestershire South since 1955; Conservative Whip, 1945–1950. For political and public services.

=== Knight Bachelor ===
- David Stirling Anderson, Director, Royal College of Science and Technology, Glasgow.
- George Lindor Brown, CBE, MB, Jodrell Professor of Physiology, University College, London.
- Major Egbert Cadbury, DSC, DFC, JP, DL. For public services in Somerset and Gloucestershire.
- John Johnston Campbell, Chairman, Committee of Scottish Bank General Managers.
- Henry Channon, MP, Member of Parliament for Southend-on-Sea, 1935–1950, and for Southend West since 1950. For political and public services.
- Alderman Bernard Nathaniel Waley-Cohen. Lately Sheriff of the City of London.
- Archibald James Dirom Crawford. For political services in the West of England.
- John Norman Dean, Chairman, Telegraph Construction and Maintenance Company Ltd.
- Josiah Eccles, CBE, MM, Deputy Chairman (Operations), Central Electricity Authority.
- George Robert Edwards, CBE, Managing Director, Aircraft Division, Vickers-Armstrongs Ltd.
- James Frederick Emery, JP. For political and public services in Salford.
- Frank Guy Clavering Fison. For political and public services in Suffolk.
- Herbert John Gordon Griffin, CBE, Secretary, Council for the Preservation of Rural England.
- Lieutenant-Colonel Roland Vaughan Gwynne, DSO, DL. For public services in Sussex.
- Noel Frederick Hall, Principal of the Administrative Staff College, Henley-on-Thames.
- Samuel Hoare, CB, Assistant Under-Secretary of State, Home Office.
- Edward George Warris Hulton. For services to journalism.
- Bertram Long, MC, TD, Senior Registrar, Principal Probate Registry.
- Charles Carnegie Martin, CBE, Chief Constable, Liverpool City Police Force.
- Colonel Jackson Millar, CBE, JP, DL. For political and public services in Scotland.
- Raymond Walter Needham, QC. For political and public services.
- Basil Edward Nield, CBE, QC, Member of Parliament for the City of Chester, 1940–1956. For political and public services.
- William Leonard Owen, CBE, Director of Engineering, United Kingdom Atomic Energy Authority's Industrial Group.
- Kenneth Wade Parkinson. For political and public services in the West Riding of Yorkshire.
- Frederick John Pascoe. For political services.
- Charles Edward Mott-Radclyffe, MP, Member of Parliament for Windsor since 1942. A Lord Commissioner of HM Treasury and a Government Whip, May–July 1945, and a Conservative Whip, 1945–1946. For political and public services.
- Charles David Read, MB, FRCS, President, Royal College of Obstetricians and Gynaecologists.
- Archibald Safford, MC, QC, Deputy Commissioner under the National Insurance Acts, Ministry of Pensions and National Insurance.
- John Roughton Simpson, CB, Controller, HM Stationery Office.
- C. P. Snow, CBE, Commissioner and Scientific Adviser, Civil Service Commission.
- John Landale Train, CBE, MC, Member, British Transport Commission.
- Hugh Watson, Deputy Keeper of Her Majesty's Signet.
- James Mann Wordie, CBE. For services to Polar exploration; Master, St. John's College, University of Cambridge.

State of South Australia

- Mark Ledingham Mitchell, Professor of Biochemistry, and Deputy Vice-Chancellor, University of Adelaide, State of South Australia.

State of Victoria

- William John Jungwirth, CMG, JP, Permanent Head of the Premier's Department, State of Victoria; principal Liaison Officer for various Australian State Governments in connection with the Olympic Games in Melbourne.
- The Honourable John Gladstone Black McDonald, JP, a former Premier and Treasurer in the State of Victoria; has rendered special services in connection with the Olympic Games in Melbourne.
- Professor George Whitecross Paton, Vice-Chancellor of the University of Melbourne, State of Victoria.

Commonwealth Relations

- John Crawford Burns, the representative in Bombay of James Finlay & Co. Ltd., and a Director of other companies in India.

Overseas Territories

- Adetokunbo Adegboyega Ademola, Chief Justice, Western Region, Nigeria.
- Alfred John Ainley, MC, Chief Justice, Eastern Region, Nigeria.
- Edward Baglietto Cottrell, CBE, JP. For public services in Gibraltar.
- Leonard Courtney Hannays, QC. For public services in Trinidad.
- Amar Nath Maini, CBE. For public services in Uganda.
- Brigadier William Eric Halstead Scupham, CMG, MC. For public services in Tanganyika.
- Douglas Tremayne Waring, CBE. For public services in the Federation of Malaya.
- Ernest Hillas Williams, Chief Justice, Sarawak, Brunei, and North Borneo.

=== Order of the Bath ===
==== Knight Grand Cross of the Order of the Bath (GCB) ====
Military Division

- General Sir Charles Falkland Loewen, KCB, KBE, DSO, ADC, (17987), late Royal Regiment of Artillery; Colonel Commandant, Royal Regiment of Artillery.
- General Sir Lashmer Gordon Whistler, KCB, KBE, DSO, (13017), late Infantry; Colonel, The Royal Sussex Regiment.
- Air Chief Marshal Sir Dermot Alexander Boyle, KCVO, KBE, CB, AFC, Royal Air Force.

==== Knight Commander of the Order of the Bath (KCB) ====
Military Division

- Vice-Admiral John Peter Lorne Reid, CB, CVO.
- Lieutenant-General Campbell Richard Hardy, CB, CBE, DSO.
- Lieutenant-General William Henry Stratton, CB, CVO, CBE, DSO, (27948), late Corps of Royal Engineers.
- Air Marshal Andrew McKee, CB, CBE, DSO, DFC, AFC, Royal Air Force.
- Air Marshal Hubert Leonard Patch, CB, CBE, Royal Air Force.

Civil Division

- Sir James Ian Cormack Crombie, KBE, CMG, Chairman, Board of Customs and Excise.
- Sir Maurice Joseph Dean, KCMG, CB, Permanent Under-Secretary of State, Air Ministry.
- Edward Wilder Playfair, CB, JP, Permanent Under-Secretary of State, War Office.

==== Companion of the Order of the Bath (CB) ====
Military Division

Royal Navy

- Rear-Admiral Philip Whitworth Burnett, DSO, DSC.
- Rear-Admiral Robert Alexander Currie, DSC.
- Rear-Admiral George Verner Motley Dolphin, DSO.
- Major-General Halford David Fellowes, DSO.
- Rear-Admiral Ralph Lindsay Fisher, DSO, OBE, DSC.
- Major-General Frank Cyril Horton, OBE.
- Rear-Admiral John Gilchrist Thesiger Inglis, OBE.
- Rear-Admiral John David Luce, DSO, OBE.
- Rear-Admiral Lancelot Arthur Babington Peile, DSO, MVO.
- Rear-Admiral William John Yendell.

Army

- Major-General John D'Arcy Anderson, CBE, DSO, (42399), late Royal Armoured Corps.
- Major-General Richard Neville Anderson, CBE, DSO, (38648), late Infantry.
- Major-General George Patrick Demaine Blacker, CBE, (34570), late Royal Regiment of Artillery.
- Major-General Robert Napier Hubert Campbell Bray, CBE, DSO, (39414), late Infantry.
- Major-General Alfred Edward Campbell, QHP, MD, DPH, (30235), late Royal Army Medical Corps.
- Major-General Ronald Albert Bramwell Davis, DSO, (33622), late Infantry.
- Major-General John Robert Crosse Hamilton, CBE, DSO, (34438), late Corps of Royal Engineers.
- Major-General William Gordon Roe, CBE, (44171), late Royal Army Service Corps.
- Major-General and Chief Paymaster Owen Patrick James Rooney, CBE, (17894), Royal Army Pay Corps.
- Major-General Ralph Younger, CBE, DSO, MC, (33496), late Royal Armoured Corps; Colonel, 7th Queen's Own Hussars.

Royal Air Force

- Air Vice-Marshal James Laurence Fuller Fuller-Good, CVO, CBE.
- Air Vice-Marshal Maurice Lionel Heath, OBE.
- Air Vice-Marshal John Conrad Neely, CBE, DM, BCh, QHS.
- Air Vice-Marshal Geoffrey Luis Worthington, CBE.
- Air Commodore Eric Scott Butler, OBE.
- Air Commodore Arthur Edmond Clouston, DSO, DFC, AFC.
- Air Commodore Dudley Spencer Radford, DSO, DFC, AFC, ADC.
- Air Commodore Alexander Mitchell Rodgers.

Civil Division

- William Armstrong, MVO, Under-Secretary, HM Treasury.
- Brigadier Euston Edward Francis Baker, CBE, DSO, MC, TD, DL, Chairman, Territorial and Auxiliary Forces Association, County of Middlesex.
- John Frederic Allan Baker, Chief Engineer, Highways Engineering Staff, Ministry of Transport and Civil Aviation.
- Bertie Kennedy Blount, Deputy Secretary, Department of Scientific and Industrial Research.
- Sir Weldon Dalrymple-Champneys, Bt., DM, FRCP, lately Deputy Chief Medical Officer, Ministry of Health.
- Lindsay Gordon Davidson, Deputy Secretary, Department of Agriculture for Scotland.
- John Alexander Drew, Under-Secretary, Board of Trade.
- Ludovic James Dunnett, CMG, Deputy Secretary, Ministry of Supply.
- Richard Lyons Alers Hankey, Principal Assistant Solicitor, Office of HM Procurator General and Treasury Solicitor.
- William Andrew Hardie Hepburn, Under-Secretary, National Assistance Board.
- Alexander Currie Hill, Under-Secretary, Board of Trade.
- Victor Albert George Lambert, CBE, Director-General of Armaments Production, Ministry of Supply.
- Brigadier John Alexander Longmore, CBE, TD, DL, Chairman, Territorial and Auxiliary Forces Association, County of Hertford.
- Graham Russell Mitchell, OBE, Attached War Office.
- Gerald Richard Paling, CBE, Deputy Director of Public Prosecutions.
- Sir Henry Campbell de la Poer Beresford-Peirse,, Deputy Director-General, Forestry Commission.
- Bernard Frank Pool, CBE, Director of Navy Contracts, Admiralty.
- Ronald Herbert Purcell, Chief Scientific Adviser, Home Office.

=== Order of Merit (OM) ===
- Sir John Douglas Cockcroft, KCB, CBE.

=== Order of Saint Michael and Saint George ===
==== Knight Grand Cross of the Order of St Michael and St George (GCMG) ====
- Sir Pierson John Dixon, KCMG, CB, Permanent United Kingdom Representative to the United Nations.

Honorary Knight Grand Cross

- Tuanku Sir Abdul Rahman ibni Al-Marhum Tuanku Muhammad, KCMG, His Highness The Yang di-Pertuan Besar of Negri Sembilan.

==== Knight Commander of the Order of St Michael and St George (KCMG) ====
- Colonel Sir (Arthur) Stanley Angwin, KBE, DSO, MC, TD, Chairman, Commonwealth Telecommunications Board. Formerly Chairman, Cable & Wireless
- The Right Honourable William Edward, Viscount Harcourt, OBE, Financial Adviser and Minister Economic, Her Majesty's Embassy, Washington.
- Oswald Raynor Arthur, CMG, CVO, Governor and Commander-in-Chief, Falkland Islands, (Governor and Commander-in-Chief (designate), Bahamas).
- Colville Montgomery Deverell, CMG, CVO, OBE, Governor and Commander-in-Chief, Windward Islands.
- Maurice Henry Dorman, CMG, Governor, Commander-in-Chief and Vice-Admiral, Sierra Leone.
- Roger Allen, CMG, lately Minister at Her Majesty's Embassy in Bonn.
- Paul Henry Gore-Booth, CMG, lately Her Majesty's Ambassador Extraordinary and Plenipotentiary in Rangoon.
- Eric Malcolm Jones, CB, CBE, Director of Government Communications Headquarters, Foreign Office.
- D'Arcy Patrick Reilly, CMG, OBE, Deputy Under-Secretary of State, Foreign Office.

==== Companion of the Order of St Michael and St George (CMG) ====
- John Harold Devine, OBE. For services as Director, Export Services Branch, Board of Trade.
- Reginald John Halsey, Assistant Engineer-in-Chief, General Post Office.
- Guy Elwin Millard, Private Secretary to the Prime Minister.
- Alun Michael Morgan, Assistant Secretary, Ministry of Labour and National Service.
- Arthur Kingscote Potter, CBE, Counsellor, United Kingdom Delegation to the North Atlantic Treaty Organisation.
- John Muir Anderson. For services in connection with political and charitable organisations in the State of Victoria.
- The Honourable Thomas Hugh William Beadle, OBE, a Judge of the High Court, and formerly a Minister, in Southern Rhodesia.
- John Adrian Fargher, Railways Commissioner, South Australian Railways.
- John Morrice Cairns James, MBE, Deputy High Commissioner for the United Kingdom in Pakistan.
- Edward James Gregory Wilson. For public services in the State of Victoria.
- The Honourable Tom Ian Findlay Wilson, Speaker of the Federal Assembly, Federation of Rhodesia and Nyasaland.
- Brigadier Geoffrey Harding Baker, CB, CBE, MC, Chief of Staff to the Governor and Commander-in-Chief, Cyprus.
- Rennie Montague Bere, Director and Chief Warden of the Uganda National Parks.
- Douglas James Smythe Crozier, Director of Education, Hong Kong.
- Bernard de Bunsen, Principal, University College of East Africa, Makerere.
- Aaron Emanuel, Assistant Secretary, Colonial Office.
- Thomas Mure Hart, Financial Secretary, Singapore.
- Kenneth Palmer Humpidge, Director of Federal Public Works, Nigeria.
- Eric Newton Griffith Jones, QC, Attorney General and Minister for Legal Affairs, Kenya.
- Henry Lawrence Lindo, Administrator, Dominica, Windward Islands.
- Colonel Reginald Townend Michelin, CVO, OBE, Commissioner of Police, Jamaica.
- Michael John Brew Molohan, MBE, Senior Provincial Commissioner, Tanganyika.
- Desmond O'Hagan, Provincial Commissioner, Kenya.
- Gilbert McMicking Roddan. Lately Director of Agriculture, Kenya, now Deputy Agricultural Adviser to the Secretary of State for the Colonies.
- Arthur Colin Russell, ED, Chief Regional Officer, Gold Coast.
- John Tennant Saunders. Lately Principal, University College, Ibadan, Federation of Nigeria.
- Peter Heathcote Guillum Scott, Financial Secretary, Northern Region, Nigeria.
- Mervyn Cecil ffrank Sheppard, MBE, Head of the Emergency Food Denial Organisation, Federation of Malaya.
- John Kinsmill Robert Thorp, MBE, Administrator, St. Lucia, Windward Islands.
- Walter Ian James Wallace, OBE, Assistant Secretary, Colonial Office.
- Arthur Trenham Weatherhead, Senior Resident, Northern Region, Nigeria.
- Maurice Frank Gerard Wentworth, OBE, Establishment Secretary, Gold Coast.
- John Edward Chadwick, lately Counsellor (Commercial) at Her Majesty's Embassy in Tokyo.
- Arthur James de la Mare, Counsellor at Her Majesty's Embassy in Washington.
- Charles Peter Hope, TD, lately Counsellor of Her Majesty's Embassy in Bonn.
- Denis Seward Laskey, Foreign Office.
- Peter Northcote Lunn, OBE, lately Principal Executive Officer, British Military Government, Berlin.
- Geoffrey Lyster McDermott, Foreign Office.
- Herbert Stanley Marchant, OBE, Her Majesty's Consul-General at Düsseldorf.
- John Arthur Pilcher, Counsellor at Her Majesty's Embassy in Madrid.
- Leonard Arthur Scopes, OBE, Foreign Office.
- Michael Norman Francis Stewart, OBE, Counsellor at Her Majesty's Embassy in Ankara.
- The Right Honourable Milo John Reginald, Baron Talbot De Malahide, lately Her Majesty's Ambassador Extraordinary and Plenipotentiary in Vientiane.
- William Hilary Young, Foreign Office.

=== Royal Victorian Order ===
==== Knight Grand Cross of the Royal Victorian Order (GCVO) ====
- Brigadier-General Sir Harold Hartley, KCVO, CBE, MC.
- Brigadier Sir Charles Alfred Howard, KCVO, DSO.
- Sir Ernest Henry Pooley, Bt., KCVO.

==== Knight Commander of the Royal Victorian Order (KCVO) ====
- Air Marshal Sir John Henry D'Albiac, KBE, CB, DSO.
- Sir James Gow Mann.
- Sir Arthur Espie Porritt, KCMG, CBE, MB, MCh.

==== Commander of the Royal Victorian Order (CVO) ====
- Lady Alice Egerton.
- Group Captain John Evelyn Grindon, DSO, AFC, Royal Air Force.
- Lady Jean Margaret Florence Rankin.

==== Member of the Royal Victorian Order (MVO) ====
At this time the two lowest classes of the Royal Victorian Order were "Member (fourth class)" and "Member (fifth class)", both with post-nominal letters MVO. "Member (fourth class)" was renamed "Lieutenant" (LVO) from the 1985 New Year Honours onwards.

Fourth Class

- Commander Robert Henry Graham, DSC, Royal Navy.
- James René Alexis Kennedy, MVO.
- Flight Lieutenant George Charles McCarthy, AFC, Royal Air Force.
- Geoffrey Owen Peskett, MVO.

Fifth Class

- Lily Caroline Ada Bell.
- Senior Commissioned Engineer Victor John Way Crompton, Royal Navy.
- William Charles Ellis.
- Lieutenant-Commander (E) Edward John Sawdy, MBE, Royal Navy (Retd).
- Olive Margaret Short.
- John Edward Powis Titman.

=== Order of the British Empire ===
==== Knight Grand Cross of the Order of the British Empire (GBE) ====
Military Division

- Admiral Sir Charles Thomas Mark Pizey, KBE, CB, DSO.
- Air Chief Marshal Sir Francis Joseph Fogarty, KCB, KBE, DFC, AFC, ADC, Royal Air Force.

Civil Division

- Sir Archibald Finlayson Forbes, Chairman, Iron and Steel Board.
- Sir Geoffrey Harington Thompson, KCMG, lately Her Majesty's Ambassador Extraordinary and Plenipotentiary in Rio de Janeiro.

==== Dame Commander of the Order of the British Empire (DBE) ====
Military Division

- Commandant Nancy Margaret Robertson, CBE, Hon. ADC, Director, Women's Royal Naval Service.

Civil Division

- The Right Honourable Sylvia, Viscountess Kilmuir, Vice-chairman of the Conservative Party Organisation, 1951–54. For political services.
- Janet Maria Vaughan (Mrs. Gourlay), OBE, DM, FRCP, Principal, Somerville College, Oxford.

==== Knight Commander of the Order of the British Empire (KBE) ====
Military Division

- Vice-Admiral John Wilson Cuthbert, CB, CBE.
- Lieutenant-General Roger Herbert Bower, CB, CBE, (24360), late Infantry.
- Lieutenant-General William Alexander Duncan Drummond, CB, CBE, (31405), late Royal Army Medical Corps.
- Air Marshal The Right Honourable Percy Ronald Gardner, Earl of Bandon, CB, CVO, DSO, Royal Air Force.
- Acting Air Marshal Geoffrey William Tuttle, CB, OBE, DFC, Royal Air Force.

Civil Division

- Sir Christopher Hinton, Member of the Board, United Kingdom Atomic Energy Authority.
- Arthur Richard Manktelow, CB, Deputy Secretary, Ministry of Agriculture, Fisheries and Food.
- Sir George Robert Mowbray, Bt., Alderman, Berkshire County Council. For services to Local Government.
- Sir Alexander Morris Carr-Saunders. For services as Director, London School of Economics.
- George Foster Stedman, CB, MC, Deputy Secretary, Ministry of Transport and Civil Aviation.
- Sir (Edward) Raymond Streat, CBE, Chairman, Cotton Board.
- Leslie Charles Kemp, CBE, British subject resident in Greece.
- George Clinton Pelham, CMG, Her Majesty's Ambassador Extraordinary and Plenipotentiary in Prague.
- The Honourable Richard Kenneth Green, Senior Puisne Judge of the Supreme Court, State of Tasmania.
- The Honourable Wilfrid Selwyn Kent Hughes, MVO, OBE, MC, ED, Minister for the Interior and for Works, Commonwealth of Australia, 1951–55; Chairman of the Organising Committee for the Olympic Games in Melbourne, State of Victoria, since 1951.
- Sir James Henley Coussey, President, West African Court of Appeal.
- Arthur Frank Kirby, CMG, General Manager, East African Railways and Harbours Administration.

==== Commander of the Order of the British Empire (CBE) ====
Military Division

Royal Navy

- Captain George Collett Blundell, OBE.
- Surgeon Captain David Herbert Kernohan, MB, BCh, (Retd).
- Captain Edward James Herbert Kirby, DSC, (Retd).
- Captain Hugh Colenso Martell.
- The Right Reverend Monsignor William Harold Davis Shepherd, OBE, Chaplain, (Retd).

Army

- Brigadier James Archibald William Ballard, DSO, MBE, (33583), late Infantry.
- Brigadier John Sorel-Cameron, DSO, (38678), late Infantry.
- Brigadier (temporary) Noel Joseph Chamberlain, MBE, (267), late Royal Army Educational Corps (now retired).
- Colonel Thomas Leslie Gwyther Charles, DSO, (44851), late Infantry.
- Brigadier (temporary) Kenneth Thomas Darling, DSO, OBE, (44052), late Infantry.
- Brigadier Alan Henry Fernyhough, MC, (30525), Royal Army Ordnance Corps.
- Brigadier Alexander Montagu Finlaison, DSO, OBE, ADC, (28071), late Infantry.
- Brigadier Montagu Geoffry Alaric Hepper (34457), late Royal Corps of Signals.
- The Reverend Frederick Wilfred Hilborne, QHC, Chaplain to the Forces, First Class (34594), Royal Army Chaplains' Department.
- Brigadier Gerald Kellett (33351), late Royal Regiment of Artillery.
- Brigadier Thomas Ifan Lloyd, DSO, MC, (26985), late Corps of Royal Engineers.
- Colonel (acting) Geoffrey Page Mason, TD, (32628), Royal Regiment of Artillery, Territorial Army.
- Brigadier (temporary) (now Colonel) Thomas Gordon Morton (44123), late Corps of Royal Engineers.
- Colonel Edward Reuben Price, TD, (92803), late Royal Corps of Signals, Territorial Army.
- The Reverend Kenneth Arthur Puntan, OBE, QHC, (52326), Chaplain to the Forces, First Class, Royal Army Chaplains' Department.
- Colonel Walter Burrans Sykes, TD, (139601), late Corps of Royal Engineers, Territorial Army (now retired).
- Brigadier William Tanner (34146), Corps of Royal Electrical and Mechanical Engineers; at present on loan to the Government of India.
- Colonel Thomas Coats Campbell, DSO, MC, ED, New Zealand Regiment; lately Commander, Fiji Military Forces and Representative of the New Zealand Chiefs of Staff in Fiji.
- Brigadier Robert Charles Strachan Hall, OBE, late Royal Regiment of Artillery; Commander, Caribbean Area.

Royal Air Force

- Air Commodore Robert William Lowry Glenn.
- Air Commodore Christopher Edgar Hartley.
- Air Commodore Cecil John Nobbs.
- Air Commodore Maxwell Edmund Massy Perkins.
- Air Commodore John Edward Rudkin Sowman.
- Group Captain Peter Henry Cribb, DSO, DFC.
- Group Captain Alan Graham Douglas, MC, RAF Regiment.
- Group Captain Christopher Harold Hartley, OBE, DFC, AFC.
- Group Captain Stewart William Blacker Menaul, DFC, AFC.
- Group Captain Sydney Charles William Rudd, MBE.
- Group Captain Frederick William Thompson, DSO, DFC, AFC.
- Group Captain Frederick Francis Wicks, OBE, DFC.

Civil Division

- Harold Maurice Abrahams, JP, Assistant Secretary, Ministry of Housing and Local Government.
- Norris Montgomerie Agnew, Chairman, Manchester Regional Hospital Board and Board of Governors, United Manchester Hospitals.
- Hugh Anderson, Assistant Secretary, Ministry of Labour and National Insurance, Northern Ireland.
- William Galloway MacDonald Anderson, Director of Works, Air Ministry.
- Francis Trevenen Arnold, Divisional Inspector, Ministry of Education.
- Bernard Ashmole, MC, lately Keeper, Department of Greek and Roman Antiquities, British Museum.
- William Learmonth Baillie, Director, Technical Personnel Administration, Ministry of Supply.
- Frederick John Ball, Deputy Secretary, Church Commissioners.
- Alexander Barclay, Keeper, Science Museum.
- Cecil Walter Hardy Beaton, Photographer and Designer.
- Rear-Admiral Roger Mowbray Bellairs, CB, CMG. Lately Head of Historical Section, Admiralty.
- Lennox Randal Francis Berkeley, Composer.
- Peter Eustace Burrell, Director of the National Stud, Ministry of Agriculture, Fisheries and Food.
- Leonard James Burt, CVO, Commander, Criminal Investigation Department, Metropolitan Police Force.
- Siegfried Cahn, Managing Director, Goodlass Wall & Lead Industries Ltd.
- Helen Maud Cam, Mediaeval Historian.
- George Basil Cameron, Conductor. For services to music.
- Donald Malcolm Campbell, Holder of the World Water Speed Record. For services to speedboat development.
- Charles Mills Cawley, OBE, Deputy Chief Scientific Officer, Department of Scientific and Industrial Research.
- Martin Chadwick, OBE, Firemaster, Glasgow Fire Brigade.
- Edward Leslie Champness, MBE, Managing Director, Messrs. Palmers (Hebburn) Co. Ltd., Hebburn-on-Tyne.
- Professor John Kaye Charlesworth. For public services in Northern Ireland.
- Richard Thomas Church, Writer.
- Harold Maurice Cohen, MD, ChB, Principal School Medical Officer, Birmingham.
- Joseph Cowen, Assistant Secretary, Board of Trade.
- William Iveson Croome, JP. For public services in Gloucestershire.
- Senator Joseph Mullan Cunningham, JP. For political and public services in Belfast.
- Roy Lorentz Daniell, Charity Commissioner.
- Nora Bryan Deane, MBE, President, Royal College of Midwives.
- John Alexander Diack, Assistant Secretary, Ministry of Labour and National Service.
- Captain Jack Donald Fletcher Elvish, OBE, Principal Marine Superintendent, Clan Line Steamers Ltd.
- Thomas Henry Evans, DL, Clerk of the Staffordshire County Council.
- William James Eves, OBE, Director of Lands and Accommodation, Ministry of Works.
- Bernard John Bycroft Ezard, Assistant Solicitor, Ministry of Labour and National Service.
- William Charles Farnsworth, Senior Partner, Berry Brothers, and Bagshaw & J. Toller Eady, Kettering.
- Angus Anderson Fulton, General Manager, North of Scotland Hydro-Electric Board.
- John Vest Garmonsway. For political services.
- Arnold Trevor Green, OBE, Director of Research, British Ceramic Research Association.
- Captain (E) William Gregson, Royal Naval Reserve, Chairman, Fuel Efficiency Advisory Committee.
- Cuthbert Greig, MBE, Independent Chairman, British Furniture Trade Joint Industrial Council Appeal Committees.
- John Wilfred Haughton, Chairman, Northern Ireland Tourist Board.
- Dudley Foster Herring, Assistant Secretary, Ministry of Pensions and National Insurance.
- Frank Hesketh, Assistant Solicitor, General Post Office.
- Thomas Archibald Montgomerie Hill. For political services in Nottingham.
- Alderman Herbert Laurence Hogg, MBE, JP. For political and public services in West Hartlepool.
- Charles Garratt Garratt-Holden, TD, Secretary, Building Societies Association.
- Henry Ralph Houston, Deputy Chief Inspector of Mines and Quarries, Ministry of Fuel and Power.
- Professor Humphrey Francis Humphreys, OBE, MC, TD, DL, MB, ChB. For services to Dental Surgery.
- Olliver William Humphreys, Director, General Electric Company Research Laboratories.
- John McQueen Johnston, MD, FRCS(Ed), Principal Medical Officer, Department of Health for Scotland.
- Harry Carter Jonas. For services to the Commissioners of Crown Lands.
- John Henry Kirk, Assistant Secretary, Ministry of Agriculture, Fisheries and Food.
- Professor Ronald Epey Lane, MD, FRCP, Member, Industrial Health Advisory Committee.
- Margaret Evelyn Leighton. For political and public services in Oswestry.
- Prince Littler, Chairman, Combined Services Entertainment Advisory Committee.
- Peter Lloyd, Deputy Director, Research and Development, National Gas Turbine Establishment, Farnborough, Hampshire.
- John Freeman Loutit, DM, FRCP, Director, Radiobiological Research Unit, Harwell.
- Lieutenant-Colonel The Honourable Malcolm Bowes-Lyon. For political and public services in Chelsea.
- Robin McAlpine, Director, Sir Robert McAlpine & Sons Ltd.
- Margaret MacDiarmaid, Lady MacColl, Chairman, Women's Voluntary Services in Scotland.
- George William John Mackay, MB, ChB, Medical Superintendent, Rampton Hospital.
- James Alexander Mackie, OBE, Chairman, Aberdeen Local Savings Committee and North East Area Savings Committee.
- John Clark Wallace Mann. For services to farming in Midlothian.
- Arthur Edwin Manning, OBE, Assistant Secretary, Ministry of Transport and Civil Aviation.
- James Martin, OBE, Managing Director and Chief Designer, Martin-Baker Aircraft Co. Ltd., Uxbridge.
- Lieutenant-Colonel Charles Moir Mason, TD, lately Chairman, University Joint Recruiting Board, University of Manchester.
- Stanley Matthews. For services to Association Football.
- William Valentine Mayneord, Professor of Physics (applied to Medicine), University of London.
- Colonel Richard Meinertzhagen, DSO. For services to Ornithology.
- Molly Mellanby, Commissioner of Prisons.
- Dawson Risch Miller, Manager, United Kingdom Mutual War Risks Association.
- John Mitchell, MBE, TD. For political and public services in Scotland.
- William Henry Moffatt, OBE, Deputy Inspector General, Royal Ulster Constabulary.
- Robert Adolph Wilton Morley, Actor-Dramatist.
- John Morris, Controller, Third Programme, British Broadcasting Corporation.
- Cecil Harold William Murphy, Assistant Secretary, War Office.
- Horace Richard Neate, JP, DL, Alderman, Bedfordshire County Council. For services to the Home Office.
- Roland Stanley Nixon, Assistant Secretary, Scottish Home Department.
- Oswald Thomas Norris, Chairman of Council, National Federation of Young Farmers' Clubs.
- The Honourable William Speke Philipps. For political and public services in Kent.
- William Norman Pickles, MD, MRCP, lately President, College of General Practitioners.
- George Frederick Pinney, Principal Executive Officer, Foreign Office.
- Charles Herbert Pollard, OBE, City Treasurer, Kingston-upon-Hull.
- John Edward Poulden, MBE, Assistant Secretary, Foreign Office.
- Edward John Powell, County Surveyor and Planning Officer, Glamorgan County Council. Chairman, Road Research Board.
- Henry Pownall, District Registrar, Manchester High Court Registry.
- Alderman Edward Calcott Pryce, OBE. For services to the Corporation of the City of London.
- The Right Honourable Eva Violet, Marchioness of Reading. For services to Child Welfare.
- Paul Kenneth Bailie Reynolds, OBE, TD, Chief Inspector of Ancient Monuments, Ministry of Works.
- Edgar Carmichael Robbins, Solicitor, British Broadcasting Corporation.
- John William Roberts, Secretary, Public Works Loan Board.
- Hugh Campbell Robertson, OBE, MC, Deputy Secretary, National Savings Committee.
- William Walter Samuel Robertson, OBE, Chairman, Eastern Regional Board for Industry.
- William Norman Robinson, Assistant Secretary, Ministry of Supply.
- Julian Salmon, OBE, Honorary Catering Adviser to the Royal Air Force.
- Roger Waterlow Sewill. For political and public services.
- Ernest Harry Dudley Skinner, Chairman, Durham Division, National Coal Board.
- Charles Shelling, Chairman and Managing Director, Inveresk Paper Company.
- George Innes Stewart, MC. For political and public services in the East of Scotland.
- Richard Hugh Stoy, HM Astronomer, Royal Observatory, Cape of Good Hope.
- Eric John Sturgess, Chief Engineer, Shell Petroleum Co. Ltd.
- Alderman Samuel Alec Taylor, JP. Lately Chairman, Cambridgeshire Agricultural Executive Committee.
- Lieutenant-Commander John Ward Thornycroft, Royal Navy (Retd.), Managing Director, John I. Thornycroft & Company Ltd., Southampton.
- David Jamieson Turner, Assistant Secretary, Ministry of Fuel and Power.
- Robert Urquhart, JP, County Clerk of Renfrew.
- Alderman John Welch, Chairman, Lancashire Education Committee.
- Egon Joseph Wellesz, Lecturer on Music, University of Oxford.
- Henry Weston Wells, Chairman, Hemel Hempstead Development Corporation.
- Charles Francis White, OBE, MD. Lately Medical Officer of Health, City of London. Recently President, Society of Medical Officers of Health.
- Colonel James Buckley Whitehead, MC, TD, JP. For political and public services in the Colne Valley.
- Hugh Lloyd Williams, DSO, MC, Member, Industrial Court and Industrial Disputes Tribunal.
- William Wallworth Wood, JP. For political and public services in Macclesfield.
- Allan Young, Controller for Scotland, Board of Trade and Ministry of Supply.
- Maroun Arab, MBE, Counsellor at Her Majesty's Embassy in Beirut.
- Gerald William Lankester Harding, lately Director of Antiquities in the Jordan Government.
- Leslie Pott, Her Majesty's Consul-General at Marseilles.
- Alexander Edward Reid, Manager, Holloway Brothers, Bagdad.
- Sidney Simmonds, OBE, Her Majesty's Ambassador Extraordinary and Plenipotentiary in Port-au-Prince.
- Gerald Ernest Stockley, Her Majesty's Consul-General at Naples.
- William Ernest Taylor, Counsellor (Raw Materials) at Her Majesty's Embassy in Washington.
- John Arthur Warder, British subject resident in Colombia.
- Gerald Hugh Wilkinson, OBE, British subject resident in the Philippines.
- Norman Dean Carlyon, OBE, a Member of the Organising Committee for the Olympic Games in Melbourne, State of Victoria.
- Robert Eric Castell, a prominent member of the United Kingdom business community in Madras, India.
- The Honourable Patrick Leslie Coleman, formerly Minister of Transport, State of Victoria; services rendered in connection with the Olympic Games in Melbourne.
- Major Clifford Hamilton Bowen-Davies, MC, ED, lately Federal Comptroller and Auditor-General, Federation of Rhodesia and Nyasaland.
- James Wright Ferguson, Member of the Melbourne City Council, State of Victoria, 1916–56.
- Arthur Colin Gordon, Secretary for Irrigation and Assistant Director of Lands, State of South Australia.
- Stanley Haviland, Under-Secretary and Permanent Head of the Department of Local Government, State of New South Wales.
- George Wellington Rex L'Ange, MBE, Member of the Federal Assembly, Federation of Rhodesia and Nyasaland.
- Lewis Luxton, OBE, Deputy Chairman of the Organising Committee for the Olympic Games, Melbourne, State of Victoria.
- John Murdock Main, Director of Public Works, State of New South Wales.
- Maurice Arnold Nathan, Chairman of the Melbourne City Council's Special Committee and Civic Committee for the Olympic Games, State of Victoria.
- Cecil Leonard Robertson, OBE, formerly a Member of the Natural Resources Board, Southern Rhodesia.
- Edgar Stephen Tanner, a Member of the Legislative Assembly, State of Victoria; Honorary Secretary of the Organising Committee for the Olympic Games in Melbourne.
- Arthur Clement Thompson, MC, Attorney-General for Basutoland, the Bechuanaland Protectorate and Swaziland.
- William Hovell Turner, CIE, MC, formerly Director of Indian Accounts, London.
- William Thomas James Uren, a Member of the Organising Committee for the Olympic Games in Melbourne, State of Victoria.
- Ralph Whishaw, ChM, FRCP, a prominent physician in Hobart, State of Tasmania.
- The Right Reverend Arnold Lomas Wylde, Bishop of Bathurst, State of New South Wales.
- William Gaudenz Beaton, Director of the Inter-African Bureau of Epizootic Diseases, East Africa.
- John Priestly Birch. For public services in Sierra Leone.
- Neville John Brooke, lately Chairman of the Public Service Commission, Western Region, Nigeria.
- Derrick Charles Brown, Chief Mechanical Engineer, Office of the Crown Agents for Oversea Governments and Administrations.
- Rudolph Augustus Burke. For public services in Jamaica.
- Thomas Wightman Chalmers, Director of Broadcasting, Federation of Nigeria.
- Horace James Fitz-Patrick, Chairman, Currency and Exchange Control Board, Bermuda.
- Alan Alfred Forward, OBE, Chairman for Road Transport, Federation of Malaya.
- Joseph Antoine Rene Lavoipierre, LRCP, LRCS, Director of Medical Services, Mauritius.
- Zekeria Mungonya, MBE, Minister of Land Tenure, Uganda.
- Valimohamed Mohamedali Nazerali, OBE. For public services in Tanganyika.
- Neville Warde Sabine, Auditor General, Gold Coast.
- William George Scott, JP. For public services in Perak, Federation of Malaya.
- Frazer Geoffrey Selby, Commissioner of Income Tax, Federation of Nigeria.
- John Veysie Montgomery Shields, OBE, QC, Attorney General, Aden.
- Joseph Trevor Simpson. For public services in Uganda.
- George Frederick Sleight, OBE, lately Director of Education, Cyprus.
- William Wenban-Smith, Director of Establishments, Tanganyika.
- Tang Shiu-Kin, OBE. For public services in Hong Kong.
- Charles Holman Barker Williams, Director of Agriculture, Trinidad.
- Wendros Williams, Official Representative, Colonial Income Tax Office.
- Ian Standish Wylie, OBE, Deputy Commissioner of Police, Federation of Malaya.

==== Officer of the Order of the British Empire (OBE) ====
Military Division

Royal Navy

- Commander John Reginald Carr.
- Commander Charles Montague Donner.
- Commander Basil MacIver Edwards.
- Commander Frederick John Emuss.
- Commander Reginald Joseph Leslie Hammond.
- Lieutenant-Colonel Henry Fraser Cranfield Kimpton, Royal Marines.
- Commander Harold Humphrey Satow.
- Lieutenant-Commander James Alexander Jervis Smith-Shand, DSC.
- Commander John Spencer.
- Instructor Commander Albert James Borking Springall, (Retd).
- The Reverend Richard Gwilym Williams, Chaplain.

Army

- Lieutenant-Colonel (acting) Geoffrey David Anderson, ERD, (72656), Combined Cadet Force.
- Lieutenant-Colonel David Charles Barbour (56003), 17th/21st Lancers, Royal Armoured Corps.
- Lieutenant-Colonel John Goodwyn Allden Beckett, TD, (86679), Royal Regiment of Artillery, Territorial Army (now T.A.R.O).
- Lieutenant-Colonel Bertram Garth Bloomer (63542), Corps of Royal Engineers.
- Lieutenant-Colonel Eric Langton Butler, MC, TD, (126417), The South Staffordshire Regiment, Territorial Army.
- Lieutenant-Colonel (acting) James Mylchreest Cain, 1st Isle of Man Battalion, Home Guard.
- Lieutenant-Colonel Colin Campbell, TD, (74956), The Royal Scots Fusiliers, Territorial Army.
- Lieutenant-Colonel (temporary) Horace Alfred Chapman (227277), Royal Army Educational Corps.
- Lieutenant-Colonel (acting) Edmund Harry Michael Clutterbuck (187171), Royal Regiment of Artillery, Territorial Army.
- Lieutenant-Colonel (acting) Victor Henry Crane (5942), Army Cadet Force.
- Lieutenant-Colonel (temporary) Henry Ernest Cross (110352), Corps of Royal Engineers (now retired).
- Lieutenant-Colonel Peter Gerald Curry (64557), Royal Corps of Signals.
- Lieutenant-Colonel (temporary) (now Major) Richard Anthony Davies (58788), The Royal Berkshire Regiment (Princess Charlotte of Wales's).
- Lieutenant-Colonel (now Colonel) Basil Oscar Paul Eugster, DSO, MC, (65413), Foot Guards.
- Lieutenant-Colonel Harry Tolson Gomersall (137745), Royal Regiment of Artillery.
- Lieutenant-Colonel Richard Bennett Gosling, TD, (89364), Royal Regiment of Artillery, Territorial Army.
- Lieutenant-Colonel George Hannan, TD, (90886), Royal Regiment of Artillery, Territorial Army (now T.A.R.O).
- Lieutenant-Colonel Alexander Forbes Hendry, MC, TD, (64733), The Argyll and Sutherland Highlanders (Princess Louise's), Territorial Army.
- Lieutenant-Colonel (temporary) (now Major) Frederick Alexander Nigel Hitch (68242), Royal Regiment of Artillery.
- Lieutenant-Colonel (acting) Henry Thomas Jarman (367837), Army Cadet Force.
- Lieutenant-Colonel (Quartermaster) John Keating, MBE, (94933), Irish Guards.
- Lieutenant-Colonel (temporary) Nicholas George Kenney (158372), Royal Army Ordnance Corps.
- Lieutenant-Colonel (Staff Paymaster, 1st Class) Howard Charles Lambert (185463), Royal Army Pay Corps.
- The Reverend Norman Maclean, MBE, Chaplain to the Forces, Second Class (62401), Royal Army Chaplains' Department.
- Lieutenant-Colonel Denis Walter Charles McCarthy, MBE, (70494), Corps of Royal Engineers.
- Lieutenant-Colonel Geoffrey Kenneth McCulloch (217636), Army Legal Services Staff List.
- Lieutenant-Colonel (temporary) Anthony Ian Rupert Murray, MBE, (63629), The Seaforth Highlanders (Ross-shire Buffs, The Duke of Albany's).
- Lieutenant-Colonel the Honourable Gordon William Nottage Palmer, MBE, TD, (87335), Royal Regiment of Artillery, Territorial Army.
- Lieutenant-Colonel (now Colonel (temporary)) George Neville Prideaux (70768), Royal Regiment of Artillery.
- Lieutenant-Colonel John Rooke Rawlence, MBE, (66045), Corps of Royal Engineers.
- Lieutenant-Colonel (now Colonel (local)) Charles Thomas Rodgers (62944), The Cheshire Regiment.
- Lieutenant-Colonel (acting) Geoffrey Mortimer Roy, MBE, MC, TD, (78496), Combined Cadet Force.
- Lieutenant-Colonel Frederick Joseph Swainson (194065), Royal Corps of Signals.
- Lieutenant-Colonel (temporary) Reginald Winfrid Stephenson, MBE, (64632), The Wiltshire Regiment (Duke of Edinburgh's).
- Lieutenant-Colonel (now Colonel) Henry O'Donnel Vyvyan (71521), Corps of Royal Electrical and Mechanical Engineers.
- Lieutenant-Colonel John Geoffrey Waugh, LRCP, LRCS, (123116), Royal Army Medical Corps, Territorial Army (now T.A.R.O).
- Lieutenant-Colonel Joseph Charles West, MBE, TD, (70573), Corps of Royal Engineers, Territorial Army.
- Lieutenant-Colonel Rodney Bertram Williams (50885), The Royal Lincolnshire Regiment (Employed List (1)).
- Lieutenant-Colonel Douglas Richard Wilson (50886), The Royal Lincolnshire Regiment (Employed List (1)).
- Lieutenant-Colonel Steven Patrick Wood (45005), Royal Tank Regiment, Royal Armoured Corps (Employed List (1)).
- Lieutenant-Colonel Leslie William Clarke, Swaziland Police Force.
- Lieutenant-Colonel Assistant Director of Ordnance Services, Federation of Rhodesia and Nyasaland.

Royal Air Force

- Acting Group Captain Walter Thomas Brooks, DSO, AFC.
- Wing Commander Trevor John da Costa Andrade (31416).
- Wing Commander Lawrence Henry Baker (39195).
- Wing Commander Eric John Brice (81439).
- Wing Commander Percy William George Burgess (45887).
- Wing Commander John Hunter Hunter-Tod (77424).
- Wing Commander Albert James Mott (43854).
- Wing Commander Hugh Gordon Oates, Malayan Auxiliary Air Force.
- Wing Commander George James Pearn (45397).
- Wing Commander James Derek Thirlwell, DFC, (42987).
- Wing Officer Constance Ellen Warren (4077), Women's Royal Air Force.
- Acting Wing Commander Romer Frederick John Barber (44725).
- Acting Wing Commander Christopher Cecil McCarthy-Jones, AFC, (91312), Royal Auxiliary Air Force.
- Acting Wing Commander Raphael Chevallier Preston, AFC, (205390), Royal Air Force Volunteer Reserve (Training Branch).
- Acting Wing Commander Gordon Steele, MBE, (31378).
- Squadron Officer Margaret Dixon (405440), Princess Mary's Royal Air Force Nursing Service.
- Squadron Leader Francis William Dowling (43604).
- Squadron Leader Frederick Arthur Drury, DFC, (61019), (Retd).
- Squadron Leader Stanley Green (44623).
- Squadron Leader Philip Michael Sweatman Hedgeland, MBE, (122540).
- Squadron Leader Edward James McDonald (111752).
- Squadron Leader George Alan Podevin (60460).
- Squadron Leader Douglas Duncan Thompson (48022).

Civil Division

- Edward Bruce Abbotts, TD, Principal Intelligence Officer, British Services Security Organisation, War Office.
- Henry John Adams, Chairman of Governors, Brixton School of Building.
- Charles Daniel Alder, Principal, Cornwall Technical College, Redruth.
- Robert Allen, Employer Vice-Chairman, Southern Regional Board for Industry.
- Alderman Edmund Edward Lane Arkell. For public services in Croydon.
- George Cyril Ash, Secretary, British Sugar Corporation Ltd.
- Robert Houseman Bagshaw, President, Fleetwood Fishing Vessel Owners Association, 1949–1956.
- Francis Edward Ball, Principal Scientific Officer, Ministry of Supply.
- Harold Philip Barnes, Assistant Accountant and Comptroller General, Board of Inland Revenue.
- William Barr, Technical Director, Colvilles Ltd., Glasgow.
- Tom Britten Bassett, Senior District Inspector of Mines and Quarries, South Western Division, Ministry of Fuel and Power.
- Walter Cecil Batson, Deputy Commander, No. 3 District, Metropolitan Police Force.
- William Anthony Beck, MVO, MBE, Senior Chief Executive Officer, HM Stationery Office.
- Lieutenant-Colonel Cecil Thomas Ashworth Beevor, TD, DL, Chairman, Association of Drainage Authorities.
- Leslie Berker, Chairman and Managing Director, Berkertex Ltd., Plymouth and London.
- Captain James Patrick Francis Betson, Commander, HMTS Monarch, General Post Office.
- Charles Thomas Bloodworth, Principal Architect, North West Region, Ministry of Housing and Local Government.
- William Henry Bloomfield, Staff Controller, Midland Region, General Post Office.
- Francis George Brewer, Secretary, the Gas Council.
- Cyril Bride, Inspector of Alkali and Works, Ministry of Housing and Local Government.
- Conyers Bridgewater. Lately Chairman, National Federation of Housing Societies Ltd.
- Geoffrey Howarth Briggs. For political and public services in Cornwall.
- George Cecil Brown, Principal, Air Ministry.
- William Michael Court-Brown, MB, ChB, Director, Group for Research on General Effects of Radiation, Medical Research Council.
- Alexander Edwin Robert Bruce, Principal, Queen Elizabeth's Training College for the Disabled, Leatherhead.
- Jean Davidson Bruce, MBE, Director, Scottish Country Industries Development Trust.
- Robert Bruce, Chief Constable, Zetland.
- Commander Malcolm Stuart Leslie Burnett, Royal Navy (Retd.), Principal, Foreign Office.
- Frederick Fielden Butterworth, Senior Principal Scientific Officer, Admiralty.
- Brigadier John Ford Bygott, MC, Secretary, Territorial and Auxiliary Forces Association, Berkshire.
- Marion, the Honourable Mrs. Ian Campbell, Nairn County President, British Red Cross Society (Scottish Branch).
- Richard Nevill Cannon, Chairman, John Wallis Ltd.
- Arthur Barrett Cardew, MC, MB, FRCS, Commissioner, St. John Ambulance Brigade, Gloucestershire.
- Harold Carver, Member, West Midlands Regional Advisory Committee, National Savings Committee.
- James Chadwick, Chief Constable, Huddersfield Borough Police Force.
- Dudley Hendin Chalk, Principal, Ministry of Agriculture, Fisheries and Food.
- Edgar Charlesworth, MBE, Chairman, Doncaster Savings Committee.
- Joseph William Christelow, Senior Principal Scientific Officer, National Physical Laboratory, Department of Scientific and Industrial Research.
- Alfred William Clarke, Principal, Ministry of Transport and Civil Aviation.
- John Clarke, lately Rector, Paisley Grammar School.
- John George Clarke, JP. For political services in County Antrim.
- John Francis Coates, Constructor, Naval Construction Research Establishment, Admiralty.
- John Clifford Colligan, Secretary-General, Royal National Institute for the Blind.
- Squadron Leader Clifford John Collins (Retd.), Secretary, Royal Air Force Small Arms Association.
- Colin Arthur Cooke, Chairman, Oxford and District Local Employment Committee.
- Alderman Egbert Frederick Cooper, JP. For political and public services in Hertfordshire.
- Harold Hartmann Corner, County Agricultural Adviser, Edinburgh, and East of Scotland College of Agriculture.
- William Conrad Costin, MC, Member, Appellate Tribunal for Conscientious Objectors (Southern Division).
- George Francis Crawley, MM, Chief Information Officer (B) and Director of United Kingdom Information Services in the Union of South Africa.
- Cyril Dipper Curtis, Deputy Regional Controller, Southern Region, Ministry of Pensions and National Insurance.
- Bernard Frankland Dark, Architect.
- David Pettit Davies, DSC, Chief Test Pilot, Air Registration Board.
- John Davies, County Agricultural Officer, Glamorgan, National Agricultural Advisory Service.
- David Maurice James Dear. For political services.
- Percy Frederick Dennard, Member, Board of Governors, United Cambridge Hospitals and East Anglian Regional Hospital Board.
- William Richard Shaboe Doll, MD, MRCP, Senior Member, Statistical Research Unit, Medical Research Council.
- Samuel Roland Driver, Assistant Regional Director (Works), Leeds, Ministry of Works.
- Percy Augustus Duke. For political services in Carshalton.
- Henry Pattinson Dunkley, Grade 2 Officer, Ministry of Labour and National Service.
- Andrew Fergus Dunlop, Director, Visitors Department, British Council.
- Lionel Michael Duncombe Grey Du Pre, Member, Cereals Deficiency Payments Advisory Committee.
- The Reverend Thomas Gerald Egerton Eakins. For services to orthopaedic development in Northern Ireland.
- The Reverend Canon John Edgar Eastwood, Officiating Chaplain to the Royal Air Force, Middle Wallop.
- Professor Reginald Allen Eastwood, Chairman of Wages Councils.
- Benno Elkan, Sculptor.
- Ernest Lyndon Fairweather, Chief Examiner, Estate Duty Office, Board of Inland Revenue.
- William Ferguson, Trade Commissioner, Grade II, Board of Trade.
- Gerard Francis Gisborne Twisleton-Wykeham-Fiennes, Operating Superintendent, Eastern Region, British Transport Commission.
- Kathleen Flew. For political services in Hull.
- Ebenezer Ford, lately Director and Secretary, Scottish Marine Biological Association.
- Eunice Ellen Frost, Executive Editor, Penguin Books Ltd.
- Alfred Arthur Garrard, Chairman, West Essex Advisory Committee, National Assistance Board.
- Hester Barre Goldie, County Director, Huntingdonshire, British Red Cross Society.
- George Albert Goldstraw, Chief Architect, Newton Aycliffe Development Corporation.
- Philip Ernest Green. For political and public services in Sussex.
- Robert Arnold Greir, Organist, Royal Choral Society.
- George Grey, Managing Director, Adhesive Tapes Ltd., Boreham Wood, Hertfordshire.
- Frederick Diamond Grover, Grade 2 Officer, Ministry of Labour and National Service.
- Winifred Mary, Lady Hamilton, Regional Administrator, North West Region Women's Voluntary Services.
- Alan Gore Heath, Assistant Director of Navy Contracts, Admiralty.
- Robert James Heath, lately Chief Executive Officer, Ministry of Pensions and National Insurance.
- Thomas Noel Hoblyn, Senior Principal Scientific Officer, East Mailing Research Station.
- Robert Hogg, Higher Collector, Hull, Board of Customs and Excise.
- Lieutenant-Colonel Francis Alexander Hough, MBE, Chief Regional Engineer, London Postal Region, General Post Office.
- Herbert Cornelius Humphries, Grade 1 Officer, Ministry of Labour and National Service.
- William James Hyndman, Chairman, County of Londonderry Committee of Agriculture.
- Katharine Jane Inglis, Honorary Secretary for Women's Work, the Church Army.
- Edna Jackson, Deputy Chief Nursing Officer, Ministry of Health.
- Emrys Gwynne James, Leader of Valve Group, Research Laboratories, General Electric Co. Ltd., Wembley.
- Captain Clifford Robert Jolly, President, Association of Hospital Management Committee Group Secretaries.
- Catherine Mary Jones, JP. For political and public services in Staffordshire.
- Joseph Henry Jones, MM, Headmaster, Prenton Secondary School for Boys, Birkenhead.
- Captain Arthur Andrew Kay, lately Master, MV Dunera, British India Steam Navigation Co. Ltd.
- William John Kedward, JP, Chairman, Glamorganshire Children's Committee.
- Geoffrey King, MBE, Honorary Treasurer, Nottingham Savings Committee.
- Hartford Mayer King. For political and public services in Kitchen.
- Joseph Young Kirkup, MBE, Chief Officer, Bristol Fire Brigade.
- Leslie George Frederick Knight, Chief Broadcasting Officer, Forces Broadcasting Service, Middle East.
- Hans Kronberger, Chief Physicist, Research and Development Branch Headquarters Industrial Group, United Kingdom Atomic Energy Authority.
- Harry Lager, MBE, MM, Lately Chief Executive Officer, Air Ministry.
- Reginald John Lee, Grade 2 Officer, Ministry of Labour and National Service.
- John Davies Knatchbull Lloyd. For services to Archaeology.
- Cyril Dudley Lovell, Chairman, Birmingham and District Industrial Safety Group.
- Charles Thorpe McInnes, Curator of Historical Records, Scottish Record Office.
- Philip McKearney, Assistant Chief Mechanical and Electrical Engineer, Ministry of Works.
- John Mackerill, Chairman, Runcorn, Cheshire, National Savings Industrial Subcommittee.
- Dorothy Mia Macnamara. For public services in Chelsea.
- Clara Elizabeth Littlewort Macwhirter, Headmistress, Manchester Central High School for Girls.
- Edith Gertrude Manners, Matron, Royal Infirmary, Glasgow.
- Leslie Sydney Marler, TD. For political and public services in Buckinghamshire.
- Albert Edward Mason, Circulation Manager, Publications Department, British Broadcasting Corporation.
- Muir Mathieson, Conductor. For services to film music.
- Anders Mathisen, Managing Director, Graviner Manufacturing Co. Ltd.
- Agnes Mary Maynard. For services to the Girl Guide Movement.
- Keith Ellis Miller, HM Inspector of Schools, Scottish Education Department.
- Stephen Minion, JP. For political and public services in Liverpool.
- William Alfred Morrison, General Secretary, National Union of Printing, Bookbinding and Paper Workers.
- Robert Murray, Chief Executive Officer, Board of Trade.
- Professor Arthur Edmund Muskett, Head of the Plant Pathology Division, Ministry of Agriculture, Northern Ireland.
- Jesse Nadin, General Manager and Director, D.P. Battery Co. Ltd., Bakewell, Derbyshire.
- Alic Nathan, Principal, Ministry of Supply.
- Colin Francis Ian Neish, JP, DL, County Commissioner, Angus, Boy Scouts Association.
- Cyril Victor Ockenden, Senior Principal Scientific Officer, Meteorological Office, Air Ministry.
- Robert Ollason, Chairman, Board of Management, Shetland Hospitals, and Member, North-Eastern Regional Hospital Board.
- Frederick William Beston Pacey. For political and public services in Stockton-on-Tees.
- Albert James Parker, JP. For services to agriculture in Herefordshire.
- Thomas John Patterson, Mayor of Carrickfergus. For public services in County Antrim.
- Kenneth Peck, JP, Chairman, Southport National Insurance Appeal Tribunal.
- Robert Deans Peggs, Principal, Royal Aircraft Establishment Technical College, Ministry of Supply.
- Alfred John Penn, Chief Engineer, Aero Gas Turbine Division, D. Napier & Son Ltd.
- Walter Laing Macdonald Perry, MD, Director, Department of Biological Standards, National Institute for Medical Research.
- Professor Arthur Phillips, JP, Lecturer in Colonial Law, London School of Economics.
- Henry Phillips, Director of Research and Secretary, British Leather Manufacturers Research Association.
- Hedley Pickbourne, Registrar, University of Nottingham.
- Major Edward Fielden Pilkington, JP, County Commissioner, South-East Lancashire, Boy Scouts Association.
- Colonel John Pirie, MBE, DL, Chairman, Lanarkshire War Pensions Committee.
- William Horace Powell, Higher Waterguard Superintendent, London, Board of Customs and Excise.
- Ewart William Prior, Principal, Ministry of Fuel and Power.
- Wing-Commander Stanley Basil Reay, Secretary, the Lawn Tennis Association.
- Alderman Percy Baldwin Renshaw, ISO, Chairman, Southend Disablement Advisory Committee.
- Reginald Frederick Cecil Roach, MBE, Registrar, Lands Tribunal.
- John Charles Robb, MD, MS, Consulting Surgeon, Downe Hospital, Downpatrick, County Down.
- William Balfour Robb. For political services in Aberdeen.
- Alleman Holly Roche, Telecommunication Engineer in charge of Submarine Cable System Development and Production Division, Standard Telephones and Cables Ltd.
- Albert Ernest Roots, Area Manager, South of Scotland Electricity Board.
- Captain James Frederick Rumbellow, Commodore Master, STS Vibex, Shell Tankers Ltd.
- Observer Captain William Rusby, Deputy Commandant, Royal Observer Corps.
- Frederick Paul Hedley-Saunders, DCM, Principal, Foreign Office.
- Percy Alfred Scholes, Music Critic.
- Francis Thomas Simons, Assistant Director of Army Contracts, War Office.
- Charles Gregor Simpson, Deputy Director General of Staff, National Coal Board.
- Kathleen Mary Lois Simpson. Lately Press Librarian, Royal Institute of International Affairs.
- Lieutenant-Colonel Ronald Davidson Simpson, DFC, DL, (Retd.), Chairman, Cumberland and Westmorland Wing, Air Training Corps.
- Bertram Sinkinson. Lately President of the Royal Photographic Society, and of the Institute of British Photographers.
- Group Captain Richard Gordon Slade, Chief Test Pilot, Fairey Aviation Company Ltd.
- Albert William Smith, Principal Officer, Ministry of Commerce, Northern Ireland.
- Arthur Witcomb Smith, Transport Manager, West Bromwich Corporation.
- Charles Arthur Murray Kyrke-Smith, Chief Air Traffic Control Officer, Ministry of Transport and Civil Aviation.
- George Herbert Smith, Deputy Director of Audit, Exchequer and Audit Department.
- Arthur Loraine Spencer, Principal, Board of Customs and Excise.
- Harry Percival Gold Spilsbury, Senior Inspector of Taxes, Board of Inland Revenue.
- Rosemary Spooner, Chairman, Littlemore Hospital Management Committee.
- Lela Elizabeth Stebbings. For political and public services in Kettering.
- Alderman Geoffrey Osborn Swayne, Managing Director, T. Swayne & Son Ltd.
- Alderman Joseph Bede Symonds, Chairman, Jarrow Housing Committee.
- Francis Foster Taylor, Secretary, Country Landowners' Association.
- Frederick Basil Thornton. For services as North American Representative, British Broadcasting Corporation.
- Alfred Francis Tims, Principal Examiner, Companies Department, Board of Trade.
- Stanley Evan Tomkins, Secretary, Salvage Association.
- Mary Georgiana, Lady Townsend, JP, Alderman, Oxford City Council.
- Cyril Owen Tremeer, Senior Architect, War Office.
- Herbert Alfred Turner, MBE, lately Chief Executive Officer, Admiralty.
- James Ronald Turner, MBE, Regional Manager, Southern Region and London North Western Region, Central Land Board and War Damage Commission.
- Francis Xavier Velarde, Architect.
- Captain Thomas Andrew Vickers, RD, Commander, Cable Ship Mirror, Cable & Wireless Ltd.
- Arthur Kingsley Vint, Honorary Treasurer and lately Honorary Secretary, English Table Tennis Association.
- Lieutenant-Colonel the Right Honourable George, Baron Walsingham, DSO, JP, President, Norfolk County and Eastern Area, British Legion.
- Peter Hugh Bennetts Ensor Walters. For political services.
- Frank George Ward, MBE, Principal, Ministry of Education.
- David Bernard Wardle, Assistant Keeper, First Class, Public Record Office.
- Robert Hanson Waterworth, JP, Deputy Chairman, Huntingdon and Soke of Peterborough Agricultural Executive Committee.
- Lieutenant-Colonel Horace Hamilton Watson, JP, DL. For political and public services in Stoke Newington and Hackney.
- Frederick Watts, Principal Information Officer, Central Office of Information.
- John Lacey West, lately Chairman, Berkshire Civil Defence Committee.
- Thomas White, Principal District Officer, Marine Survey Office, Liverpool, Ministry of Transport and Civil Aviation.
- Charles Thomas Whyman, MBE, Chief Executive Officer, Patent Office, Board of Trade.
- William Denison Clare Wiggins, Deputy Director of Colonial Surveys, Colonial Office.
- Archibald Williams, Head of Claims Department, Foreign Office.
- James Sinclair Williams, Director, Coal Utilisation Council.
- Alderman Robert William Williams, Vice-Chairman, Welsh Joint Education Committee.
- Ronald Stenning Wimpenny, Deputy Director of Fishery Research, Ministry of Agriculture, Fisheries and Food.
- Edward Ernest Woods, Alderman, Hammersmith Metropolitan Borough Council.
- Harry Kenneth Worship, General Manager, Thorpe Road Works, Laurence, Scott & Electromotors Ltd., Norwich.
- Marguerite, Lady Williams Wynn. For political and public services in Wrexham.
- Major Alexander Young, TD. For public services in Essex.
- Paul Cedric Douglas Archer, lately First Secretary (Labour) at Her Majesty's Embassy in Helsinki.
- John Bowler, British subject resident in Iran.
- William George Clifford, lately First Secretary at Her Majesty's Embassy in Beirut.
- Lieutenant-Commander Alexander Putnam Cumming, MBE, DSC, Royal Navy (Retd.), lately Her Majesty's Consul at Tromso.
- Harry Frank Brien Fane, MBE, lately First Secretary (Labour) at Her Majesty's Embassy in Washington.
- Harold Malcolm Dudley Fletcher, Communications Officer, Office of the Commissioner-General for Her Majesty's Government in the United Kingdom in South-East Asia.
- Gerald William Francis Franklin, British subject resident in Guatemala.
- Alexander Black Grant, British subject resident in the United States of America.
- Wilfrid Joseph Hill, lately Controller of the Banking, Currency and Exchange Control Section, Ministry of Finance and Economics, Sudan Government.
- John Kerr-Johnston, Secretary of the British Chamber of Commerce in Rio de Janeiro.
- Kenneth Hugh Lauder, lately Scientific Attache at Her Majesty's Embassy in Bonn.
- Sydenham Frederick Moore, MB, MRCS, British subject lately resident in Egypt.
- Eric Parry, MBE, MB, FRCS(Ed.), Chief Medical Officer to the Kuwait Government.
- Charles Herbert Eckersley Phillips, Senior partner in Watson, Phillips & Co., Mexico City.
- Rodney John Rich, lately British Consul at Libreville.
- Wilfred Lewis Thomas, MBE, Her Majesty's Consul at Rosario.
- Herbert Raymond Guyler White, Her Majesty's Consul at San Francisco.
- Robert Allan, Chairman of the Board of Trustees of the Cranborne Hostel for new settlers in Southern Rhodesia.
- Harold Joseph Austin, Chairman of the Press, Radio and Television Committee in the State of Victoria for the visit of The Duke of Edinburgh to open the Olympic Games.
- John Flint Baillie, a member of the United Kingdom Community in Sylhet, East Pakistan. For services to the United Kingdom Association, Pakistan.
- Edith Wilmshurst, Lady Bird, President of the Birmingham Branch, Victoria League. For services rendered in connection with hospitality to visitors from overseas.
- Edith Burnside. For social welfare services, especially in connection with hospital auxiliaries, in the State of Victoria.
- Eric Chapman, District Superintendent, Native Recruiting Corporation, Maseru, Basutoland.
- Norman Chinner, a prominent orchestral and choral conductor in the State of South Australia.
- The Honourable Daniel Clyne, formerly a Member and, for a period, Speaker of the Legislative Assembly of the State of New South Wales.
- Alexander George Coulthard, Officer-in-Charge, Regional Planning and Decentralisation Division, Premier's Department, State of Victoria; State Transport Officer for the visit of The Duke of Edinburgh to open the Olympic Games in Melbourne.
- Edwin Bernard Evans, President of the Rhodesia National Farmers' Union. For services to Agriculture in the Federation of Rhodesia and Nyasaland.
- Robert Peter Fawcus, Deputy Resident Commissioner and Government Secretary, Bechuanaland Protectorate.
- Herbert Daniel Gowran Fitzpatrick, MBE, lately Senior District Officer, Swaziland.
- Richard Ellis Forrester, a member of the United Kingdom community in Bombay, India.
- Thomas Forristal, Accountant to the Treasury, State of Victoria; State Treasury representative on the Organising Committee for the Olympic Games in Melbourne.
- Clarence Middleton Griggs, Superintendent of High Schools, Education Department, State of South Australia.
- Joseph Jackson. For services to the community in parliamentary and local government, State of New South Wales.
- Herbert Chiswell Jones, a member of the United Kingdom community in Calcutta, India.
- Violet Barry Lambert, JP, a member of the Shire of Fern Tree Gully Council, State of Victoria, for many years.
- Lydia Longmore. For services rendered under the auspices of the Mothers' Clubs on behalf of schools in the State of South Australia.
- Henry James McGennan, a member of the Warrnambool City Council, State of Victoria.
- Haydn Jones Morris, MRCS, LRCP. For public services in the Federation of Rhodesia and Nyasaland.
- Francis Graham Muirhead, Administrative Officer, Basutoland.
- Richard Malcolmson Page, JP, Warden of the Municipality of New Norfolk, State of Tasmania.
- Leslie Fraser Piesse, a member of the Hobart Marine Board, State of Tasmania, for many years.
- Roy Hamilton Roberts, Director of Irrigation, Southern Rhodesia.
- Mac Steward, JP, a member of the Warragul Shire Council, State of Victoria.
- The Reverend Arthur Thomas Strange, a Minister of the Methodist Church in the State of South Australia.
- Cecil Harry Thompson, head of the Economic Section of the Prime Minister's Office, Federation of Rhodesia and Nyasaland.
- Neil Garnsworthy Wishart, JP, Reception Officer for the Government of the State of Victoria; Secretary to the Royal Visit Secretariat for the visit of The Duke of Edinburgh to open the Olympic Games in Melbourne.
- St. Michael Mobolaji Bank-Anthony. For public services in the Federation of Nigeria.
- Leslie Wilson Banks, MB, ChB, Senior Medical Officer (Clinical), Western Region, Nigeria.
- Guy Trayton Barton, Assistant Chief Secretary (Administration), Barbados.
- William George Bawden, Head of Department, Class "B", Office of the Grown Agents for Oversea Governments and Administrations.
- John Bentley, District Officer, Northern Rhodesia.
- William Morris Beveridge. For services to education in the Gold Coast.
- Kenneth Andrew Bidmead, Deputy Commissioner of Police, Hong Kong.
- Margaret Oswald Clark Bonthron, Queen Elizabeth Overseas Nursing Service, Matron-in-Chief, Uganda.
- William John Stainforth Brabant, Accountant-General and Collector of Customs, Gilbert and Ellice Islands Colony.
- William Joseph Branday, MRCS, LRCP, Superintending Medical Officer (Specialist), Trinidad.
- George Gavin Carlyle, Deputy Financial Secretary, Federation of Nigeria.
- Kenneth Cleland, MBE, Deputy Commissioner of Police, Uganda.
- Kenneth Stephen Collins, MBE, Overseas Audit Service, Director of Audit, Western Region, Nigeria.
- Henry Edmund Cornish, MC, Postmaster-General, Sarawak.
- James Edward Seymour Crawford. For public services in Perak, Federation of Malaya.
- Michael John Davies, Administrative Officer, Tanganyika.
- Robert Winchester Dean. For public services in Northern Rhodesia.
- The Venerable Archdeacon Samuel Adeola Delumo, Church Missionary Society, Abeokuta, Western Region, Nigeria.
- William Norman Dolton, lately Administrative Secretary for Works, Kenya.
- Lionel William Donough, MBE, lately Clerk of the Legislative Assembly, Singapore.
- Joseph Cornibert Duboulay. For public services in St. Lucia, Windward Islands.
- Charles Sandricourt Thiele Edmondson. For public services in Sierra Leone.
- Michael de Normann Ensor, Administrative Officer, Gold Coast.
- John Forbes, Deputy Director of Public Works, Hong Kong.
- Philip Forster Foster. For public services in Kenya.
- Maurice Gersh. For public services in Northern Rhodesia.
- Andrew Nicholas Goode, Financial Secretary, North Borneo.
- Ellice Handy. For services to education in Singapore.
- George Najem Houry, QC. For public services in Tanganyika.
- The Reverend Canon Edward Arthur Hubbard. For public services in British Honduras.
- Keith Heathcote Hunter, Director of Surveys, Northern Region, Nigeria.
- Alhaji Abubakar Imam, Member of The Public Service Commission, Northern Region, Nigeria.
- Francis Raban Johnson, MBE, Chief Fisheries Officer, Gold Coast.
- Richard Henry Ardagh Johnson, Settlement Engineer, Penang and Province Wellesley, Federation of Malaya.
- Cyril Lionel Kranenburg, Accountant-General, British Guiana.
- Kwan Chai Chuen. For public services in North Borneo.
- Lam Chi-Fung. For services to education in Hong Kong.
- Norman Burton Larby, Deputy Director of Education, Kenya.
- Major John William Lay, lately Senior Superintendent of Police, Sierra Leone.
- Harold William Long. For public services in the Federation of Nigeria.
- Vincent Homer McFarlane, Permanent Secretary/Ministry of Agriculture and Lands, Jamaica.
- Cyril McGrail, Commissioner of Lands and Works, Gibraltar.
- Richard William David Maxwell, MB, ChB, lately Deputy Director of Medical Services, Fiji.
- Mehmed Nedjati Munir, Solicitor-General, Cyprus.
- Oon Hoot Ewe. For services to the Boy Scout Movement in Penang, Federation of Malaya.
- Robert James Stewart Orwin, MBE, Assistant Director, Central Office, Overseas Audit Department.
- Alastair Buttar Paterson. For public services in Zanzibar.
- Johannes Lodewicus Pretorius. For services to education in Nyasaland.
- Arthur Frederick John Reddaway, Administrative Secretary, Cyprus.
- Lewis John Rumsey. For public services in Nyasaland.
- Arthur Freese Wing Sheffield, Director of Agriculture, Eastern Region, Nigeria.
- Gilbert Shelley. For public services in Penang, Federation of Malaya.
- The Venerable Archdeacon Alfred Amieyomain Dandeson Spiff, Anglican Diocese of the Niger Delta, Eastern Region, Nigeria.
- William Arthur Leigh Tucker, FRFPS, FRCS(Ed.), Surgeon Specialist, Aden.
- Thomas William Tyrrell. For public services in Tanganyika.
- Bertram John Western, Commissioner of Famagusta, Cyprus.
- Arnold Dalrymple Breckon Wylie, Government Printer, Tanganyika.

Honorary Officers

- Tuan Haji Mohamed Noor bin Haji Zadnuddin. For public services in Kelantan, Federation of Malaya.
- Havea Tu'iha'ateiho, Deputy Premier and Minister of Works, Tonga.

==== Member of the Order of the British Empire (MBE) ====
Military Division

Royal Navy

- Lieutenant-Commander Robert Stuart Bryden, DSC, (Retd).
- Lieutenant-Commander (SD) George Stanley Buss.
- Wardmaster Lieutenant-Commander Leonard John Carter.
- Lieutenant-Commander (E) Donovan Arthur Follows, (Retd).
- Communication Lieutenant-Commander Thomas Douglas Grosset, MVO.
- Major Francis Andrew Tollemache Hallday, Royal Marines.
- Lieutenant-Commander Eric Harwood.
- Lieutenant (SD) Charles Leslie Lawrence.
- Major (Quartermaster) George Burnell William Lucas, Royal Marines.
- Instructor Lieutenant-Commander Harry Guy Middleton, (Retd).
- Lieutenant-Commander Gordon Ronald Paterson.
- Supply Lieutenant Kennard Ross.
- Lieutenant-Commander Douglas Victor Swann, Royal Naval Volunteer Reserve.
- Lieutenant-Commander Reginald Bertram Wood, VRD, Hong Kong Royal Naval Volunteer Reserve.

Army

- Major (Quartermaster) Reginald Arthur Adams (147487), Royal Army Service Corps.
- 10545123 Conductor Frederick George Alexander, Royal Army Ordnance Corps.
- S/838791 Warrant Officer Class I William Alfred Atherton, Royal Army Service Corps.
- Major John Bancroft, TD, (312004), Corps of Royal Military Police, Territorial Army.
- S/57680 Warrant Officer Class I Hubert Walter Barrett, Royal Army Service Corps.
- 5379674 Warrant Officer Class II George William Bayliss, The Oxfordshire and Buckinghamshire Light Infantry.
- S/14040611 Warrant Officer Class II Roger Gllyn Lewis Bound, Royal Army Service Corps.
- Captain (Quartermaster) Francis William Boutwood (425125), The Bedfordshire and Hertfordshire Regiment.
- Major John Vaughan Bradley, TD, MB, FRCS (Edin.), (53802), Royal Army Medical Corps, Territorial Army.
- 6398267 Warrant Officer Class I Herbert Burden, Corps of Royal Military Police.
- 550463 Warrant Officer Class II John Cassidy, The Ayrshire Yeomanry (Earl of Carrick's Own), Royal Armoured Corps, Territorial Army.
- 4691667 Warrant Officer Class I Herbert Chadwick, MM, The King's Own Yorkshire Light Infantry.
- Major (acting) James Chaplin (347877), Army Cadet Force.
- Major John Allen Hurle Clarke (124560), The Somerset Light Infantry (Prince Albert's).
- Major Michael John Aldford Clarke (358527), The East Surrey Regiment.
- 775552 Warrant Officer Class II George Edward Cooper, Royal Regiment of Artillery, Territorial Army.
- 21004264 Warrant Officer Class I John Corrigan, Corps of Royal Engineers.
- Major John Every Couper (179149), Corps of Royal Electrical and Mechanical Engineers (now retired).
- Major (Quartermaster) John Charles Cox (559982), The East Surrey Regiment.
- Major (Director of Music) James Frederick Dean, ARCM, (384663), Royal Army Service Corps.
- T/64491 Warrant Officer Class II Frederick John Dibden, Royal Army Service Corps.
- 19012634 Warrant Officer Class II John Edward Dods, Royal Corps of Signals.
- Major (Quartermaster) Frank James Downes (205860), Royal Army Medical Corps.
- Major Maurice Herbert Micallef-Eynaud (83107), Royal Malta Artillery.
- 21002316 Warrant Officer Class II William Gaffney, Royal Regiment of Artillery.
- 2318693 Warrant Officer Class I Ernest Russell Gay, Royal Corps of Signals.
- 22221984 Warrant Officer Class I (Bandmaster) William James Gilyatt, The Middlesex Regiment (Duke of Cambridge's Own), Territorial Army.
- 3651127 Warrant Officer Class I James Goss, The South Lancashire Regiment (Prince of Wales's Volunteers).
- ER/4185532 Warrant Officer Class II Hugh Patrick Graham, Small Arms School Corps.
- 2733903 Warrant Officer Class I David John Griffiths, Welsh Guards.
- Captain Dennis Edmund Griss (352021), Corps of Royal Military Police.
- Captain (Quartermaster) George Cyril Hackett (419148), Grenadier Guards.
- 22266552 Warrant Officer Class II Francis George Hale, The Royal Hampshire Regiment, Territorial Army.
- Major (Electrical and Mechanical Officer) Arthur James Harris (274373), Corps of Royal Engineers.
- Major Francis Jesse Hayes (363324), The Royal Hampshire Regiment.
- Major William Heath (63336), Royal Regiment of Artillery (now R.A.R.O).
- 22241339 Warrant Officer Class II Charles Arthur Hill, 3rd/4th County, of London Yeomanry (Sharpshooters), Royal Armoured Corps, Territorial Army.
- 22266996 Warrant Officer Class II Albert Edward William Horlock, Royal Regiment of Artillery, Territorial Army.
- Major (acting) William Howarth (168577), Combined Cadet Force.
- S/4974230 Warrant Officer Class II Herbert William Hoyles, Royal Army Service Corps.
- Captain Wallace William Huggins (411592), Royal Regiment of Artillery, Territorial Army.
- 3312152 Warrant Officer Class II James Cameron Kane, The Highland Light Infantry (City of Glasgow Regiment), Territorial Army.
- Major Heather Jessie Kirkwood, ARRC, (206263), Queen Alexandra's Royal Army Nursing Corps.
- 743636 Warrant Officer Class II Henry John Lines, Royal Regiment of Artillery, Territorial Army.
- Major Charles MacGregor (233489), The Royal Scots (The Royal Regiment).
- 3054083 Warrant Officer Class II John Mackay, The Royal Scots (The Royal Regiment).
- Captain Frank Mansfield (134810), Royal Corps of Signals, Territorial Army.
- Major (temporary) Robert Graham McAlpine (341884), Corps of Royal Engineers.
- 6008160 Warrant Officer Class I Patrick McGeever, MM, The Essex Regiment.
- 22266498 Warrant Officer Class II Herbert McKenzie, The King's Own Yorkshire Light Infantry, Territorial Army.
- Major John James McKinney, MC, (121067), The Black Watch (Royal Highland Regiment).
- Major Wilfred John Mellors (248334), Corps of Royal Electrical and Mechanical Engineers.
- 22271769 Warrant Officer Class II Alfred Moore, The Royal Irish Fusiliers, Territorial Army.
- 21003240 Warrant Officer Class II Charles Robert Owen, Royal Regiment of Artillery, Territorial Army.
- Major Edward John Paddy (287433), Corps of Royal Electrical and Mechanical Engineers.
- 22259101 Warrant Officer Class I (Bandmaster) William Henry Parsons, The Hertfordshire Regiment, Territorial Army.
- Captain (Quartermaster) Charles William Phillips (423655), The Gloucestershire Regiment.
- Major Percy John Powell (224726), Royal Regiment of Artillery.
- Major (Quartermaster) Edward Henry Proctor (159356), The Royal Inniskilling Fusiliers.
- Major (temporary) William Charles Quick (357992), Royal Pioneer Corps.
- Major (Quartermaster) Reginald Frank Ragless (185630), Corps of Royal Engineers (now retired).
- 4741728 Warrant Officer Class I (Bandmaster) Ernest Frederick Rippon, ARCM, The Parachute Regiment.
- Major George Rork, MC, (153245), The Duke of Cornwall's Light Infantry (Employed List (4)).
- Major (acting) Charles Edgar Sayer (275993), Army Cadet Force.
- 843669 Warrant Officer Class I William George Shave, Royal Regiment of Artillery.
- Major George William Shepherd (233582), Royal Corps of Signals.
- Major Leslie Douglas Slater (65442), Royal Army Pay Corps.
- Major (Quartermaster) Thomas Patrick Smith (333558), The Royal Ulster Rifles.
- Major Francis Herbert Stileman (151863), Royal Regiment of Artillery.
- Major Gordon Craig Taylor (231857), Royal Army Medical Corps.
- Major (Quartermaster) Fredric John Dixon Ridge-Valentine, TD, (95967), Royal Regiment of Artillery, Territorial Army.
- Major Edward Varley (132052), Royal Regiment of Artillery.
- Major (acting) Samuel Warrington (332561), Army Cadet Force.
- Captain (Quartermaster) Edward Thomas Richard Whittle (342035), Royal Army Medical Corps.
- Major William Gaspier Benedict Wright (303576), Royal Corps of Signals.
- 2656175 Warrant Officer Class I Albert Goodhall, Coldstream Guards; at present on loan to the Government of India.
- Major John Edward Miller, Federation of Malaya Volunteer Force.
- Major John Thong Sing Ching, Singapore Volunteer Corps.

Royal Air Force

- Squadron Leader George John Aylett (52771).
- Squadron Leader Robert Winster Bracken (500526).
- Squadron Leader Percival Guy Farley (63353).
- Squadron Leader Edward Goodrick (49764).
- Squadron Leader Douglas Alexander Joss (56133).
- Acting Squadron Leader James Alfred Vincent McDonagh (64513), Royal Air Force Volunteer Reserve (Training Branch).
- Acting Squadron Leader Albert Sharman (62853), Royal Air Force Volunteer Reserve (Training Branch).
- Acting Squadron Leader Lionel Wood, DFM, (45300).
- Flight Lieutenant Gordon Allen-Rowlandson (130320).
- Flight Lieutenant William Appleton (53008), (Retd).
- Flight Lieutenant Edward Attwell (49846), (Retd).
- Flight Lieutenant Francis William Benson (760562).
- Flight Lieutenant Gordon Derek Broadhurst (3123826).
- Flight Lieutenant Frederick James Bull (541734).
- Flight Lieutenant William George Daynes, DFM, (53432).
- Flight Lieutenant Brian Ewart (566633).
- Flight Lieutenant Leslie Firth (43908).
- Flight Lieutenant Charles Heseltine (622916).
- Flight Lieutenant Evan John Bonham Hopkins (591391).
- Flight Lieutenant Wilfred Trevor Joyce (58385).
- Flight Lieutenant Eugene Percival Ledlie (578107), RAF Regiment.
- Flight Lieutenant Daniel Barrowman Macfarlane, BEM, (50077).
- Flight Lieutenant Eric Oswald Mackay (162586).
- Flight Officer Betty Mills-Thomas (4939), Women's Royal Air Force.
- Flight Lieutenant Henry Austin Probert (3115628).
- Flight Lieutenant Herbert Alfred Riddiford (57623).
- Flight Lieutenant Wilfred Robinson (53044).
- Flight Lieutenant Leslie Beart Spink (194435).
- Flight Lieutenant George James Thwaites (58466), RAF Regiment.
- Flight Officer Elizabeth Patience Millicent Westbury (2057), Women's Royal Air Force.
- Flying Officer Sydney Hawthorne Hanson (2686508), Royal Auxiliary Air Force.
- Flying Officer Thomas Calistus Kerr (591452).
- Mulazim Ali Ahmed Audhali (4858), Aden Protectorate Levies.
- Warrant Officer Douglas Broad (590236).
- Warrant Officer William John Richardson Gent, BEM, (352198).
- Warrant Officer Douglas Edward John Murray (632350).
- Warrant Officer Charles Frederick Pummery (755709).
- Warrant Officer Arthur Jesse Randell (365789).
- Warrant Officer John Henry Slater (365331).
- Warrant Officer Charles Joseph Strevens (565768).
- Warrant Officer Robert Charles Walker (531289).
- Warrant Officer James William Wilson (565048).
- Master Technician Douglas James Livett (574823).
- Acting Warrant Officer Margaret Mitchell (880415), Women's Royal Air Force.
- Acting Warrant Officer George Victor Watkinson (553616).

Civil Division

- Alexander Adair, JP, Member, Down County Council.
- William Richard Amery, lately Chairman, Newton Abbot District Committee, Devon Agricultural Executive Committee.
- Alfred Andrews, Superintendent, Plymleigh Boarding Home for Boys, Plymouth.
- Alderman Arthur Walter Andrews. For public services in Chelmsford.
- Wilfred Andrews, Chief Officer, Tynemouth Fire Brigade.
- Cecilia May Angold, Higher Executive Officer, Board of Trade.
- William Arblaster, MC, Warden, Luxborough Lodge (Home for Old People), London, W1.
- Percival Archer, Chief Male Nurse, De La Pole Hospital, Willerby, East Riding of Yorkshire.
- Edward John Ashdown, Accountant, Usutu Forests, Colonial Development Corporation, Mbabane, Swaziland.
- Olive Aston, Deputy Director, Birmingham, British Red Cross Society.
- James Atkinson, Chief Engineer, SS Clydebrae, Hugh Craig & Co. Ltd.
- Major John Charles Wesley August, Civil Defence Officer, Pilkington Brothers, St. Helens, Lancashire.
- Henrietta Elisabeth Baber, Senior Executive Officer, Foreign Office.
- Percy Back, Assistant Director, Passport Control Department, Foreign Office.
- Herbert John Victor Bacon, Higher Executive Officer, Home Office.
- Annie Brodie Brown Bannerman. For political and public services in Moray and Nairn.
- Thomas Loveday Barnes, Director, Alford & Alder (Engineers) Ltd.
- Malcolm Barnett, Honorary Treasurer, Bridgwater, Somerset, Savings Committee.
- Elsie May Barton, Chief Superintendent of Typists, Civil Service Commission.
- Reginald Grayson Barton, Member, Winsford Urban District Council.
- Francis William Beazley, Clerk to the National Joint Council for the Building Industry.
- Lewis Cohen Beber, JP. For political and public services.
- Charles Wilfrid Bell, Inspector of Taxes, Board of Inland Revenue.
- Joan Latimer Beloe, Clerk-Interpreter, Military Attache's Office, Her Majesty's Embassy, Lisbon.
- Uriah Henry Betteridge, District Officer, Cambridge, Transport and General Workers' Union.
- Norman Beveridge, Inspector of Taxes, Board of Inland Revenue.
- Ernest Hugh Bicknell, Senior Clerk, North-West European District, Imperial War Graves Commission.
- Evelyn Marguerite Boake, ARRC. For services to old people in Cambridge.
- The Reverend Father Emmanuel Thomas Borg, Honorary Chaplain, King's Own Malta Regiment.
- James Hamilton Bowden, Service Manager, Mirrlees, Bickerton & Day Ltd., Stockport.
- Victor William Noel Bowles, Chief Telecommunications Superintendent, London Telecommunications Region, General Post Office.
- Edwin James Bowley. For services to youth in Cardiff.
- George Rutherford Bradley, Grade 3 Officer, Ministry of Labour and National Service.
- Ethel Mary Brindle, Senior Executive Officer, Ministry of Pensions and National Insurance.
- Alphonso Garnet Leo Brown, Senior Executive Officer, Land Registry.
- Frederick William Brown, Chief Officer, Burnley Fire Brigade.
- John Henry William Brown, Chief Officer, Wigan Fire Brigade.
- Margaret Monteith Browne, Senior Experimental Officer, Rothamsted Experimental Station.
- Eva Susan Buckwell, lately Matron, Royal West Sussex Hospital, Chichester.
- Walter Maurice Sunday, Chief Officer, Soke of Peterborough Fire Brigade.
- Captain Edward James Elliot Burt, Senior Captain, 1st Class, Argonaut Fleet, British Overseas Airways Corporation.
- James Butcher, Senior Executive Officer, Forestry Commission.
- Sidney Thomas Butteris, lately Senior Executive Officer, Board of Customs and Excise.
- Joseph Camm, JP. Lately Member, Nottinghamshire Agricultural Executive Committee.
- Jesse Chandler. For political services in Petersfield.
- Beatrice Kate Chaplin, Executive Officer, Radio Research Station, Department of Scientific and Industrial Research.
- Samuel Leslie Chave, Clerk, Wincanton Rural District Council.
- Frederick Jarvis Christie, Higher Executive Officer, Air Ministry.
- George Sydney Church, Senior Major, Salvation Army. For welfare work among Servicemen and their families.
- Albert Ernest Coe, Senior Experimental Officer, Ministry of Supply.
- John Owen Ewart Cole, Headmaster, Blisworth County Primary School, Northamptonshire.
- Lionel Walter Coleman, Inspector of Taxes (Higher Grade), Board of Inland Revenue.
- Constance Mary Collen. For political and public services in Essex.
- Albert Collins. For political and public services in Chingford.
- Bernard Fitzgerald Collins, Airport Commandant, Southend Municipal Airport.
- Frederick Joseph Stratford Douglas Collins, Clerical Officer, Commonwealth Relations Office.
- Stella Eileen Cooley. For political and public services in Staffordshire.
- Reginald Vincent Cooper, Secretary, Institute of Plumbers Ltd.
- Ethel Phyllis Corner, Probation Officer, Derbyshire.
- Edgar Llewellyn Crabb, Grade 3 Officer, Branch B, Foreign Office.
- Archie Fielden Crabtree, Production Officer, Grade I, Admiralty.
- William James Cramond, Senior Executive Officer, Ministry of Pensions and National Insurance.
- William John Crawford, District Commandant, Ulster Special Constabulary.
- Cecil Henry George Croad, lately Chief Foreman (Technical Grade I), Royal Mint.
- Walter Cecil Cropper, Group Leader, Research Laboratories, General Electric Co. Ltd.
- Walter Percival Cross, Head Postmaster, Banbury, Oxfordshire.
- John Charles Crunden, Grade 4 Officer, Ministry of Labour and National Service.
- Alderman Frank Dale, Chairman, Crewe, Congleton and District War Pensions Committee.
- Doris Davey, Regional Officer, Latin America Department, British Council.
- Lucy May Davies. For political and public services in Chester.
- John Edward Day, Assistant Engineer, Research Station, General Post Office.
- Arthur Sidney Devine, Executive Officer, Commonwealth Relations Office.
- Edith Frances Dilbeck, Senior Executive, British Iron and Steel Federation.
- Gertrude Alice Dorrington, Independent Midwife, Cambridge.
- Minnie Douglas, Home Nurse, Irlam District, Lancashire County Council.
- Thomas Jesse Dove. Lately Clerk and Superintendent, Billingsgate and Leadenhall Markets.
- William Drakeford, Works Manager, Armstrong Siddeley (Brockworth) Ltd., Gloucester.
- William Richard Drury. For political services in Harborough.
- William Godfrey Thomas Duke, Supervisor, Navy, Army and Air Force Institutes, Malaya.
- Norah Dunbar, Superintendent of Typists, Ministry of Health and Local Government, Northern Ireland.
- Archibald Amos Elliott, Higher Executive Officer, Ministry of Transport and Civil Aviation.
- Henry Herbert Ellmers, Higher Executive Officer, Admiralty.
- William Verney Eustace. For political and public services in Bingley.
- Arthur Victor Jesse Evans, Road Safety Organiser, Brighton County Borough Council.
- Charles Herbert Evans, Personnel Manager, Automatic Telephone & Electric Co. Ltd., Liverpool.
- David Evans, lately Chief Building Inspector, Erith Corporation.
- Frank Sydney Evans, Coke Manager, South Eastern Gas Board.
- Hannah Elizabeth Mills-Evans, District Nurse-Midwife, Montgomeryshire County Council.
- Henry Horace Evans, lately Executive Officer, British Museum.
- Nora Grace Evans, Higher Executive Officer, Ministry of Housing and Local Government.
- Frederick Thomas Faulkner, Organiser, Emergency Meals Training Service, London County Council.
- Mary English Fisken. For political services in the East of Scotland.
- Thomas Ralph Flintoff, Honorary Secretary, Preston and Fulwood Savings Committee.
- Thomas James Fluendy, lately Sub-Area Commercial Officer, Southern Electricity Board.
- Benjamin Pullman, Chief Information Officer, British Non-Ferrous Metals Research Association.
- Leonard Gartside, Head of Department of Commerce and Management, South West Essex Technical College, London.
- Edwin Bowie Gauntlett, Member, Marliborough and Pewsey District Committee, Wiltshire Agricultural Executive Committee.
- Alfred Henry Gay, lately Senior Executive Officer, Nottingham, Ministry of Supply.
- Peter George, Member, Wrexham Rural District Council.
- Leonard Milner Gill. For political and public services in Gillingham.
- Charles William Gillman, Senior Executive Officer, Ministry of Works.
- Alfred Gilpin, JP, Chairman, Moira Rural District Council, County Armagh.
- Paul Goodwin, Member, Shropshire Agricultural Executive Committee.
- Hugh Inglis Wardrop Gordon, Test House Manager, Colvilles Ltd., Dalzell Steel Works, Motherwell.
- Lily Etta Graham, County Borough Organiser, Sheffield, Women's Voluntary Services.
- John Christie Gray, Member of Council, St. Andrew's Ambulance Association.
- John Harrison Gray, Senior Mechanical Designer Draughtsman, W. H. Allen, Sons & Co. Ltd., Bedford.
- Margaret Annie Gregson, Honorary Secretary, Street Groups Sub-Committee, Berwick-on-Tweed Savings Committee.
- David Robert Grey, Senior Executive Officer, Ministry of Health.
- David Tudor Griffiths, Headmaster, Pencoed Junior School, Glamorgan.
- Charles Alfred Grimmer, RD, Skipper, Steam Trawler Ben Meidie.
- Reginald Charles William Gunner, Senior Trade Officer, Ministry of Agriculture, Fisheries and Food.
- Herbert Stanley Haigh, Senior Executive Officer, Ministry of Education.
- Frank James Jackson Hale, Senior Shipping Officer, Ministry of Transport and Civil Aviation.
- Doris Mellefont Hamilton, Accountant, Grade I, Public Trustee Office.
- Samuel Lindsay Hamilton, JP, Lands Officer, Department of Agriculture for Scotland.
- Albert Harrison, Chief Actuary, West Midland Trustee Savings Bank.
- Edith Mary Hart, Deputy Administrator, Services Welfare Department, Women's Voluntary Services.
- William Charles Harvey, Assistant Chief Constable, Devon Constabulary.
- Reginald Haworth, Instructor, Staff Training Department, British Broadcasting Corporation.
- Arthur Robert Heygate, JP, Chairman, Northampton Rural District Council.
- Muriel Alice Reuss Hibbert, JP. For political and public services in Chorley.
- Patrick Higgins, Welfare Officer, Roman Catholic Approved Schools, Glasgow and Lanarkshire.
- Reginald John William Hill, Higher Executive Officer, Ministry of Pensions and National Insurance.
- Walter Leslie Hill, Honorary Secretary, Newport, Monmouthshire, Savings Committee.
- Francis Thomas Hillman, Senior Executive Officer, HM Stationery Office.
- Mary Thompson Hindmarch, Headmistress, Monkseaton Village Infants' School, Northumberland.
- Ethel Bartram Hodge, Executive Officer, Board of Trade.
- Squadron Leader Herbert Cecil Richard Holden, Commandant, "P" Division, Metropolitan Special Constabulary.
- Walter Harry Hopkins, Works Manager, EMI Factories Ltd., Wembley.
- Maud Hopper. For political and public services in Hertfordshire.
- Jane Horrocks. Lately Ward Sister, Edmund Potter Hospital, Bolton.
- James Fenwick Howey, Works Manager, Clarke Chapman & Co. Ltd., Gateshead.
- Harry Hoyle, Director, Lancashire Association of Footwear Manufacturers.
- Frederick William Hubert, County Youth Employment Officer, Derbyshire.
- Arthur Hughes, Higher Executive Officer, No. 7 Maintenance Unit, RAF Quedgeley, Gloucestershire.
- Marjorie Glen Hull. For political and public services in Hendon.
- Thomas Stirling Husband, Chairman, Industrial Committee, Belfast Savings Council.
- James Hutton. For services to youth in Belfast.
- Walter Frederick Jaggs, Higher Executive Officer, Air Ministry.
- Arthur Gordon Jamieson, JP, Alderman, Borough of Crosby.
- George Langdon Janes. Lately Honorary Superintendent, British Seamen's Orphan Boys' Home, near Torquay.
- Alice Maud Jenkins, Councillor, Dumfries County Council.
- Leslie Ritchie Graham Jenkins, MC. For political and public services in Workington.
- Captain Carl Rudolph Jess, Theatrical Specialist, Grade B, Combined Services Entertainment, British Army of the Rhine.
- Walter Myrddin Johns, Higher Executive Officer, Cardiff, Ministry of Housing and Local Government.
- David Arthur Jones, Area Officer, Caernarvon, National Assistance Board.
- Sydney George Jones, Records Officer, French District, Imperial War Graves Commission.
- Cyril Alfred Joyce, Headmaster, Cotswold Approved School, near Swindon.
- Emma Kameen, Executive Officer, Ministry of Pensions and National Insurance.
- Alice Maude Kemp, Honorary Secretary, and Treasurer, Holywood Nursing Society, County Down.
- Gilbert Henry Gentry Kennett, JP, Chairman, Canterbury Civil Defence Committee.
- Albert William Kieft, Chairman of Committee, No. 215 (Swansea) Squadron, Air Training Corps.
- George William Kilmister, First Radio Officer, RMS Arundel Castle, Union Castle Mail Steamship Co. Ltd.
- William Joseph Kilner, Senior Accountant, Board of Trade.
- Walter Ernest Lanham, Executive Officer, Ministry of Defence.
- Arthur Lees, General Secretary, Inskip League of Friendship (for Disabled Persons), Oldham.
- Gertrude Anne Leonard, Establishment Assistant, Television Service, British Broadcasting Corporation.
- Thomas Leonard Lightfoot, Honorary Director and Secretary, Ludun Ltd.
- Joseph Lindsay, Chief Generator Erector, Bruce Peebles & Co. Ltd., Edinburgh.
- Alderman Elizabeth Mary Lister. For political and public services in Leeds.
- Walter Charles Littlejohns, MM, Chief Welfare Officer, London Postal Region, General Post Office.
- Winifred Locket. For services to the Family Welfare Association in Lewisham.
- Frederick Edward Brettell Long, Welfare Officer, Staff Department, Shell-Mex and BP Ltd.
- Thomas Alexander Lumsden, Second Master, Royal Hospital School, Holbrook, Admiralty.
- Eric Laybourn Lycett, Assistant, Outside Broadcasts, British Broadcasting Corporation.
- James Macaulay, Honorary Chairman, Town Planning Institute (Scottish Branch).
- Charles Harper McCall, Manager, Grain Warehouse Department, Leith Dock Commission.
- Sarah Jane McCall. For political and public services in Renfrewshire.
- Malcolm Macdonald, lately Grade 3 Officer, Ministry of Labour and National Service.
- Mary Agnes Blair Macfarlane. For political services in Edinburgh.
- James MacGregor, Superintendent and Deputy Chief Constable, Motherwell and Wishaw Burgh Police.
- Anne Mowat MacKay, District Administrator, Western District of Scotland, Women's Voluntary Services.
- Alexander McKendrick, MC, Employer Chairman, Lanarkshire District Advisory Committee, Scottish Board for Industry.
- James Mackenzie, Assistant Principal Clerk, Board of Inland Revenue.
- David McKibbin, JP, Honorary Secretary, Donaghadee, County Down Station Branch, Royal National Life-boat Institution.
- Alexander David Bain Mackie, MB, ChB, Chairman, Birmingham Stirling Sea Cadet Corps Unit.
- William McKinnon, Inspector, Sea Transport Survey Office, Glasgow, Ministry of Transport and Civil Aviation.
- May McLean, Clerk and Finance Officer, National Health Service Executive Council, Inverness County.
- Constance Marion Molyneux McNaughtan. For political and public services in Westmorland.
- John George Frederick McRill, Traffic Accountant and Internal Auditor, Western and Southern National Omnibus Companies.
- Gerald Stanley Mansell, Secretary, Hosiery and Knitwear Export Group.
- Captain William Manson, Master, MV Deerwood, France, Fenwick & Co. Ltd.
- Robert Donald Marshall, Chief Engineer, Maidstone & District Motor Services Ltd.
- Percy George Thomas Martin, Chief Accountant, Territorial and Auxiliary Forces Association, County of Hertfordshire.
- Frederick Charles Marwood, Chairman, Eastbourne Savings Committee.
- Gwilym Matthews, JP, Member, Flintshire Agricultural Executive Committee.
- Irene Maud Matthey. For political and public services in South Devon.
- Andrew May, Senior Fishery Officer, Scottish Home Department.
- Gladys Maude Meade, Organiser of Blood Donor Sessions, Rutland.
- Alderman Constance Eveline Meakin. For public services in Staffordshire.
- Alfred George William Measures, Secretary, Yorkshire Allotments and Gardens Federation.
- Alexander Reginald Mellor, Chairman of Committee, No. 1024 (East Wight) Squadron, Air Training Corps.
- Ernest Albert Middleditch, General Production Manager, de Havilland Aircraft Co. Ltd., Chester Works.
- Agnes Brown Gordon Millar, Teacher of Music, Kirkcaldy High School.
- James Graham Millar, MM, Superintending Technical Officer, Ministry of Works.
- James William Miller, Principal Information Officer, Colonial Office.
- Frank Millington. For services to old people in Congleton.
- Illtyd Gomer Millward, Principal Clerk, County Public Health Department, Glamorganshire.
- Frank William Mitchell, Chief Forester, Bedford Settled Estates, Woburn.
- Helen Pearson Galbraith Mitchell, Vice-President, West of Scotland Branch, Soldiers', Sailors' and Airmen's Families Association.
- William Smith Mitchell, Executive Officer, Ministry of Agriculture, Fisheries and Food.
- Sara Alice Moreland, Postmistress, Newtownards, County Down.
- Bertram Arthur Morris, Senior Investigating Officer, Civil Aviation Accidents Investigation Branch, Ministry of Transport and Civil Aviation.
- Leslie Albert Laughton Mote, Senior Executive Officer, Ministry of Works.
- John Mountain, Senior Works Foreman, Thomas Marshall & Son Ltd., Leeds.
- William Mulholland, MC, Honorary Secretary, Worcester Savings Committee.
- Harold Neville Murray, Cargo Services Manager, British European Airways.
- Leo Thomas Murtha, Higher Executive Officer, Board of Trade.
- Jim Naylor, Manager, Boiler Shop, Cammell Laird & Co. Ltd., Birkenhead.
- Dorothy Lester Newcomb, JP. For political and public services in Kent.
- Stanley Frank Nicholls, Senior Executive Officer, Foreign Office.
- Andrew Aitken Nisbet, JP, Director, Co-operative Convalescent Homes in Scotland.
- William Joseph Noah, MM, Regional Collector of Taxes, Board of Inland Revenue.
- George Frederick Oliver, Deputy Chief Engineer, South Western Gas Board.
- Amelia Dorothy Orchard, Honorary General Secretary and Treasurer, Central Council of the Royal Naval Friendly Union of Sailors' Wives.
- Frederick James Orton, Trade Union Chairman, Nottingham District Advisory Committee, North Midland Regional Board for Industry.
- Margery Susannah Osborne (Mrs Webb), Local Fuel Overseer, Gloucester City and Rural District.
- Thomas Jones Page, Grade 4 Officer, Ministry of Labour and National Service.
- Henry Palmer, Senior Inspector of Weights and Measures, London County Council.
- James Park, Chief Investigation Officer, Board of Trade.
- Dorothy Mary Parrack, Headmistress, Infants' Department, Godwin County Primary School, West Ham.
- Charles Parsons. For services to youth in Yeovil.
- The Reverend Charles Edward Paterson, Chairman and Chaplain, Cowes Sea Cadet Corps Unit.
- John Patterson, Superintendent, Northumberland Constabulary.
- Daisy Pattison. For political services.
- Charles Wood Paul, Deputy Manager, Harland & Wolff Ltd., Southampton.
- Rodney William Paul, Salvage Officer, Risdon Beazley Ltd., Southampton.
- Robert Pauling, Assistant Division Officer, Ministry of Agriculture, Fisheries and Food.
- John Phillips, Chief Training Officer, Organisation and Services Division, Ministry of Transport and Civil Aviation.
- William Ernest Pryor, Senior Experimental Officer, Air Ministry.
- Doris Avery Radford, Head of Housing Specialist and Purchasing Department, Headquarters, Women's Voluntary Services.
- Aubrey John Lumley Ramm. For political services in King's Lynn.
- Jack Leslie Ransome, DCM, Development Engineer, Birmingham & Midland Motor Omnibus Co. Ltd.
- William Thomas Richards, Technical Class Grade B, Atomic Weapons Research Establishment, Aldermaston.
- Reginald Arthur Ridsdale, Inspector of Mines, East Midland Division, Ministry of Fuel and Power.
- Frank Henry Ripley, Chief Civil Defence Warden, Lincoln.
- Henry George Rivett, Senior Executive Officer, Air Ministry.
- Sidney Francis Robbie, Grade 4 Officer, Branch B, Foreign Office.
- David Walter Hurt Roberts, Pharmacist, HM Prison Wormwood Scrubs.
- John Robertson, County Welfare Officer, Stirling County Council.
- Thomas Daniel Robertson. Lately Governor, Class IV, Cornton Vale Borstal Institution, Stirlingshire.
- Leah Robinson, Assistant County Director, Monmouthshire, British Red Cross Society.
- Joe Stanley Roebuck. Lately Mechanical Engineer, No. 6 (North Barnsley) Area, North Eastern Division, National Coal Board.
- Frederick Watts Roper, Senior Executive Officer, Board of Trade.
- George Ross, Director and Manager, Rubislaw Granite Co. Ltd.
- George William Rossiter. For political and public services in County Durham.
- Arthur Clifford Rotherham, Purser-Chief Steward, MS Derbyshire, Bibby Line Ltd.
- Thomas Rowand, Inspector of Clerical Establishments, Scotland, General Post Office.
- Ivy Alice Rowe, Regional Clothing Officer, Nottingham, Women's Voluntary Services.
- Herbert George Edmund Rowley, Senior Executive Officer, Ministry of Pensions and National Insurance.
- John Salkeld Sagar, Higher Executive Officer, Central Land Board and War Damage Commission.
- Mary Ethel Elizabeth Sarah, County Nursing Superintendent, St. John Ambulance Brigade, City and County of Bristol.
- Dennis Kinnaird Saunders, Executive Officer, Ministry of Education.
- Helen Norah Beatrice Saunders. For political services in Cheltenham.
- Joseph Schofield, Superintendent and Deputy Chief Constable, Oldham Borough Police Force.
- Dennis George Scuse, Station Director, Forces Broadcasting Service, British Army of the Rhine.
- Annie Sharp. For political and public services in Preston.
- Margaret McAndrew Sharp, Public Health Inspector, St. Marylebone Borough Council.
- William Sharples, MC, JP, Chief Civil Defence Warden, Preston.
- Edith Lilian Shaw, Assistant, Overseas Travel, British Broadcasting Corporation.
- Major Kenneth Gordon Woodbine Shennan, Honorary Secretary, Gloucestershire Playing Fields Association.
- Kathleen Mary Sheppard. For services to St. David's Home, Ealing.
- Sidney Herbert Sheriff, lately Senior Accountant, Admiralty.
- Arthur Harold Sherratt, Works Engineer, Standard Motor Company Ltd., Coventry.
- Major Edward Allan Shipley, Royal Artillery (Retd.), Senior Scientific Assistant, Royal Military College of Science, War Office.
- Captain Charles Palmer Simpson, Honorary Secretary, The Coldstreamers' Association, London.
- Harry James Sims, Civilian Stores Officer, Base Ordnance Depot, Bicester, War Office.
- Dora Sinclair. For political services in Hampstead.
- John Sinclair, Supplies Officer, Ministry of Finance, Northern Ireland.
- Stanley George Singleton, Headmaster, Abbotswood County Primary School, Totton, Hampshire.
- Frederick Howard Smart, Assistant Manager, Royal Ordnance Factory, Cardiff, Ministry of Supply.
- Frederick Cyril Butler Smith, Chemist II, Ministry of Supply.
- George John Keats Smith, Head Foreman Shipwright (Steel), Swan, Hunter & Wigham Richardson Ltd., Wallsend Shipyard, Northumberland.
- Harold Smith, Member representing Leicester City, National Savings Assembly.
- James Smith, Clerk to the Deputy Licensing Authority, Scottish Traffic Area Sub-Office, Ministry of Transport and Civil Aviation.
- Molly Catharine Price-Smith, Attached War Office.
- Reginald Prior Snow, Grade 3 Officer, Ministry of Labour and National Service.
- Albert William Southerton, Inspector, Royal Aircraft Establishment, Farnborough, Ministry of Supply.
- John Southwell, Honorary Secretary, Glasgow City Chamberlain's Department Savings Group.
- Barnet Venitus Spivack, Honorary Joint Secretary and Treasurer, National Industrial Salvage and Recovery Council.
- Captain John Wilkinson Stamper, Master, MV Pavia, Cunard Steamship Co. Ltd.
- Harry Starr, Signals Officer, Civil Aviation Telecommunications Directorate, Ministry of Transport and Civil Aviation.
- George Pybus Stephenson, Supervising Examiner of Driving Tests, Northern Traffic Area, Ministry of Transport and Civil Aviation.
- George Charles Stevens, Assistant (Productivity and Planning), Waterloo, Southern Region, British Railways, British Transport Commission.
- Sidney Stevens, District Engineer, Paddington, Western Region, British Railways, British Transport Commission.
- Irene Grace Sudul, Senior Executive Officer, Ministry of Pensions and National Insurance.
- Frank William Symmonds, Senior Executive Officer, War Office.
- William Willson Syrett, Export Manager, E. K. Cole (Radio Division) Ltd., London.
- Alfred Joseph Charles Tatt, Higher Executive Officer, Ministry of Supply.
- Andrew Telfer, Senior Executive Officer, Ministry of Pensions and National Insurance.
- George Harry Templeman, DCM, Higher Executive Officer, General Post Office.
- John Salkeld Tetley, Senior Information Officer, Central Office of Information.
- Charles Stanley Thomas. For services to Archaeology in Neath.
- Alfred John Thompson. For services to Music in Monmouthshire.
- Dorothea Mary Thompson, Chief Welfare Officer, Air Ministry.
- Frank Blacklock Thomson, MB, ChB, Deputy Chairman, Dundee National Service Medical Board.
- Eric Adolphus Blagburn Tooth, Clerical Officer, Air Ministry.
- Arthur Townsend, BEM, Chief Superintendent, Metropolitan Police Force.
- Robert William Trevett. For political services in Bournemouth.
- John Edward Tyrie, Trade Union Organiser, National Union of General and Municipal Workers.
- Samuel William Underwood, Conductor, Stroud Choral Society.
- Eliza Veitch, JP, Chairman, Tynemouth, Wallsend and District War Pensions Committee.
- Frederick Adolphus John Verroest, Deputy Armament Supply Officer, Admiralty.
- Constance Walden, Clerical Officer, Board of Customs and Excise.
- Helene Mary Walker. For political and public services in Cardiff.
- Robert James Walker, District Inspector, Royal Ulster Constabulary.
- George Walmsley, JP, Managing Director, Engineer and Secretary, Londonderry Gaslight Company.
- Mary Kay Walshaw, Private Secretary, Thos. Firth & John Brown Ltd., Sheffield.
- Frederick Francis Walter. For political services in Esher.
- John William Ward, Chairman, Leicestershire and Rutland War Pensions Committee.
- Samuel Norman Ward, Senior Executive Officer, Ministry of Pensions and National Insurance.
- Alfred Henry Warren, Executive Officer, Cabinet Office.
- William Warren, Generation Engineer (Operation), East Midlands Division, Central Electricity Authority.
- Harry Reginald Fritz Wastie, Principal Executive Officer, Metropolitan Police Office.
- Elizabeth Moir Watson, Milk Production Advisory Officer, Grade II, National Agricultural Advisory Service.
- Jean McGregor Watt, District Nurse, Kirriemuir.
- Denzil Brudenel Webbe, Mechanical and Electrical Engineer, Air Ministry.
- Bertram Francis Charles Weston, JP, Divisional Officer, South Wales and Monmouthshire, Union of Shop, Distributive and Allied Workers.
- Violette Evelyn Wharhirst, Honorary Secretary, Mill Hill Social Service Committee.
- Major Adrian Leslie Robey White, Field Officer, Grade I, Ministry of Agriculture, Fisheries and Food.
- Stanley Wilkinson, Departmental Manager, Boots Pure Drug Co. Ltd.
- Ella Margaret Willcox, Executive Officer, Ministry of Health.
- Frederick John Henry Williams, Higher Executive Officer, Ministry of Agriculture, Fisheries and Food.
- Christina Brown Wilson, JP, Headmistress, Park Special School, Kilmarnock.
- Daniel Wilson, lately Deputy Regional Coal Officer, Scottish Region, Ministry of Fuel and Power.
- Frederick George Terence Wilson, First Grade Clerk, Cable & Wireless Ltd.
- James McMorran Wilson, Hill Sheep Farmer in Selkirkshire.
- Margaret Laird Wilson, Grade 3 Officer, Ministry of Labour and National Service.
- Marie Kathleen Wilson, Assistant Welfare Superintendent, St. Dunstan's.
- Alfred Alexander Wodehouse, Secretary, Foresters Homes, Bexleyheath.
- Gladys May Woodruff, Managing Director and Secretary, Sunrise Egg Producers Ltd.
- George Frederick Woods, lately Deputy Principal Officer, Office of the Agent for Northern Ireland in Great Britain.
- Ernest Philip Wyatt, MM, lately Senior Executive Officer, Ministry of Agriculture, Fisheries and Food.
- John Michael Adams, Chartered Accountant, Mexico City.
- Major George Herbert Burton, MC, lately Her Majesty's Consul at Split.
- Herbert Thomas James Crean, British Vice-Consul at Chicago.
- William Nish Darling, TD, lately Her Majesty's Vice-Consul at Hanover.
- Ferdinand Fabre de Lagrange, Assistant Functional Officer, British Council, Ankara.
- Agnes Mary Duffner (Sister Gabriel), British subject resident in Iraq.
- Harold Douglas Fazakerley, British Vice-Consul at Baltimore.
- Marjory Allen Hall, Assistant Director, Anglo-Uruguayan Cultural Institute, Montevideo.
- Ida Mary Herbert, Welfare Officer at Her Majesty's Consulate-General in Nice.
- John Thomas Katzaros, British subject resident in Tangier.
- Pleasance Ellen Lewis, British subject resident in the United States of America.
- The Reverend Henry Ormonde McConnell, Head of the Methodist Church in Hayti.
- Elisabeth McDougall, lately Shorthand-typist at Her Majesty's Embassy in Saigon.
- John McKechnie, British subject resident in Argentina.
- Frederick Hamilton March, GC, Mechanical Field Engineer, Ministry of Agriculture, Sudan Government.
- Percy Charles Pell, lately Her Majesty's Consul at Tunis.
- Susan May Pritchard, British subject resident in Peru.
- Margaret Myfanwy Rees, Personal Assistant to Her Majesty's Ambassador in Stockholm.
- Edgar Rossignaud, British Vice-Consul at Naples.
- Nora Constance Rugeroni, British subject lately resident in Uruguay.
- Dominic Scerri, lately British Vice-Consul at Port Said.
- Gustavus Sears, lately Communications Officer, Office of the Commissioner-General for Her Majesty's Government in the United Kingdom in South-East Asia.
- Teo Loh Swee, Head of the Transport Section, Office of the Commissioner-General for Her Majesty's Government in the United Kingdom in South-East Asia.
- William Henry Turnbull, lately Temporary Senior Executive Officer at Her Majesty's Embassy in Bonn.
- Sydney Whitwell, British subject resident in Chile.
- Stephanie Renata Wittenberg, Her Majesty's Vice-Consul at Trieste.
- John Houghton Wolstenholme, lately Her Majesty's Vice-Consul at Kiel.
- Amanda Caroline Wynnes, Her Majesty's Vice-Consul at Zurich.
- Thomas Bell, JP, formerly a member of the Maldon Shire Council, State of Victoria.
- Cecil Augustus Salmond Bond, JP, a member of the Woorayl Shire Council, State of Victoria.
- Agnes Beatrice Armstrong Buck, District Nurse for the Inyanga District, Government Medical Service, Federation of Rhodesia and Nyasaland.
- Edith Cawsey. For services on behalf of mentally retarded girls in the State of Victoria.
- Sylvia Chase. For social welfare services in the State of New South Wales.
- Sheila Ruth Collett, a member of the secretariat at Government House, Sydney, State of New South Wales.
- John Joseph Collins, President of the Board of Directors, Royal South Sydney Hospital, State of New South Wales.
- Edward Davison, Chief Game Warden, Wankie Game Reserve, Federation of Rhodesia and Nyasaland.
- Irene Florence Gilbert, a Gwelo Town Councillor, Southern Rhodesia. For social welfare service.
- Louisa May Good. For social welfare services in the Nyah District, State of Victoria.
- Isabel Mary Agnes Graham, Senior Typist and Stenographer, Premier's Department, State of Victoria; a member of the special staff for the visit of The Duke of Edinburgh to Melbourne.
- Olive Gumprich, MB, ChB. For social welfare services in Southern Rhodesia.
- Irene Hall. For services to Nursing in the State of New South Wales.
- Elizabeth Rose Hanretty, formerly Assistant Secretary to the South Australian Branch of the Australian Labour Party.
- John Hick, formerly a member of the staff of the Currency Board, Federation of Rhodesia and Nyasaland.
- Major Robert Clifford Barclay Hoole, Officer Commanding the Bulawayo Detachment of the British South Africa Police Reserve, Southern Rhodesia.
- Neil Thompson Howard, Secretary of the Development Committee, State of Victoria; has assisted in the preparation of the programme for the visit of The Duke of Edinburgh to Melbourne.
- Joan Leech, Commissioner for Girl Guides in the Bechuanaland Protectorate.
- Michael L'Estrange. For services to public and charitable organisations in the State of New South Wales.
- Arthur Fitzhenry Martin, an Assistant Secretary in the Ministry of Agriculture, Federation of Rhodesia and Nyasaland.
- Norma Isabel Menzies. For social welfare services in Portland, State of Victoria.
- Richard Mitchell, a fruit farmer at Renala Khurd, District Montgomery, West Pakistan.
- Elizabeth Pulane Moremi, Regent of the Batawana Tribe, Bechuanaland Protectorate.
- Robert Cuthbert Ogg, MB, ChB, formerly a Medical Officer in Basutoland.
- William Olver, JP, of Northcote, State of Victoria. For social welfare and municipal services.
- Adele Clare Marchant Penfold, JP, a prominent social welfare worker in and around Melbourne, State of Victoria.
- Richard Walter Petheram, an Assistant Secretary on the staff of the Interim Federal Public Service Commission, Federation of Rhodesia and Nyasaland.
- Archibald Richard Quinn, JP, Council Clerk of the Ulverstone Municipality, and President of the Council Clerks' Association, State of Tasmania.
- Albert Westby Graham-Rose, Dairy Officer, Agricultural Department, Swaziland.
- William Wyro Shaw, JP, a member of the Werribee Shire Council, State of Victoria.
- Sophie Zoe Shearer. For social welfare services in Southern Rhodesia.
- Frank Unwin Simpson, Superintendent of Police, and Chief of the Melbourne Police District, State of Victoria.
- Anthony William Skidmore. For services rendered in connection with patriotic and charitable movements in the State of New South Wales.
- Warwick Geoffrey Smith, Assistant Reception Officer for the Government of the State of Victoria; has rendered special services in connection with the visit of The Duke of Edinburgh to Melbourne.
- Olive Mildred Lamport Stokes. For social welfare services in Umtali, Southern Rhodesia.
- Evelyn Walker, Matron of the Leribe Hospital, Basutoland.
- Walter Joseph Webb, formerly Chairman of the Hawker District Council, State of South Australia.
- Kathleen Pearl Wicks, Honorary Secretary of the Council of Auxiliaries, Royal Hobart Hospital, State of Tasmania.
- May Willoughby. For services to the Red Cross in the State of South Australia.
- Mohammed Shu'aib Ackbarali. For social welfare services in Trinidad.
- The Reverend Michael Adebanjo, Vicar of St. Paul's Church, Shagamu, Western Region, Nigeria.
- Emanuel Adepoju Adewa, Headmaster, Omu Senior Primary School, Northern Region, Nigeria.
- Tuan Sheikh Ali bin Sheikh Abdul Hamid Bajunid, State Home Guard Officer, Perlis, Federation of Malaya.
- Philip John Allen, Inspecting Engineer, Office of the Crown Agents for Oversea Governments and Administrations.
- Joseph Samuel Alves, JP. For public services in the Grenadines, Windward Islands.
- Joseph Cudjoe Attah, Civil Engineering Assistant, Kumasi Municipal Council, Gold Coast.
- Rodger Austin, Field Officer, Development Organisation, Tanganyika.
- David Molade Songotayo Bajomo, Assistant Superintendent of Press, Federation of Nigeria.
- Arthur Laidlaw Baker, Establishment Officer, Fiji.
- The Reverend Brother Leo Barrington. For services to education in Malta.
- Aubrey John Bearman, Chief Pharmacist, Federal Medical Service, Nigeria.
- Henry Hannington Rusoke Berunga, Senior Assistant Agricultural Officer, Uganda.
- John William Hornbuckle Betts, Principal Livestock Officer, Northern Rhodesia.
- Robert Francis Bizaare, Accountant and Harbourmaster, St. Helena.
- John Frederick Booth, Overseas Audit Service, Principal Auditor, Leeward Islands.
- Edna Dulcie Martha Bryant. For medical welfare services in North Borneo.
- Datu Tuanku Bujang bin Tuanku Haji Othman, Administrative Officer, Sarawak.
- Austin Fergus Burke, Superintendent of Police, Cyprus.
- John Davies Campbell, MC, District Officer, Mathira Division, Kenya.
- Alumoogil Mathai Cherian. For services to youth in Singapore.
- Lum Tong Ch'ng. For social welfare services in Kota Star, Federation of Malaya.
- James Alfred Clewley, Administrative Officer, Northern Region, Nigeria.
- The Reverend Lionel Cordeiro. For services to education in the Federation of Malaya.
- Demetris Couppis, Forest Officer, Cyprus.
- Catherine St. George Crawley. For public services in Bermuda.
- Dunstan Maurice Byron Cromwell, JP, Comptroller of Inland Revenue, Windward Islands.
- Richard Radcliffe Darlington, Education Officer, Somaliland.
- Alan James Howarth Dempster, MC, Deputy Controller of Supplies, Federation of Malaya.
- Vincente Kelvin Dias. For public services in Trinidad.
- Olive Carey Doke. For missionary services in Northern Rhodesia.
- Ethel Rosaline Dove, Chief Matron and Schoolmistress, Government Industrial School (Girls), Barbados.
- Effie Travis Dugmore, Supervisor of Midwives and Health Visitors, Nairobi City Council, Kenya.
- Paul Lawrence Dunbar. For public services in Sierra Leone.
- Sylvia Isabel Dunkerly, Office Manager, Registry, University College of the West Indies.
- Louis Harry Stanhope Eitelberg, Senior Head and Vice-Principal, Kampala Technical Institute, Uganda.
- Dorothy Ellicott. For public services in Gibraltar.
- Abdiukahman Abby Farah, Administrative Officer, Somaliland.
- Esther Gertrude Fletcher. For services to education in Kenya.
- Inez Edith Foulcher. For services to education in Fiji.
- Berend Johannes Petrus Fourie, Senior Field Officer, Veterinary Services, Tanganyika.
- Ernest Wellington Fuller, Assistant Secretary, British Honduras.
- Suliman Beran Gaye, JP. For public services in the Gambia.
- Matthew George, Technical Assistant (Superscale), Survey Department, Singapore.
- Geoffrey Colin Guy, District Commissioner, Sierra Leone.
- Catherine Isabella Macrae Hastie, Senior Community Development Officer (Women), Uganda.
- James Herbert Hempstead, Director of Music, Gold Coast Police Force.
- Amy Henry. For social welfare services in Trinidad.
- Trevor Vernon Hooley, Officer-in-Charge, Government Wireless Station, Falkland Islands.
- Margaret Hudson, Cypher Officer, Cyprus.
- Christopher Archibald Jackson, Accountant, Treasury, Federation of Nigeria.
- Kenneth Charles William James, Executive Engineer, Public Works Department, Northern Region, Nigeria.
- Baboucar Ousman Semega-Janneh, Superintendent of Surveys, Gambia.
- Abdul Kadiri, Senior District Head, Katsina Emirate, Northern Region, Nigeria.
- Harold Matthew Kirk, Chief Accountant, Public Works Department, Northern Rhodesia.
- Lieutenant-Colonel Alan Knight, lately Camp Commandant, Prisons Service, Kenya.
- William Thomas Knott, Archivist, Special Branch, Police Force, Singapore.
- Sebastian Byekwaso Kyewalyanga. For medical services in Uganda.
- George Albert Lewis, Assistant Secretary, Eastern Region, (Nigeria.
- Enid Linton, Secretary to the Minister of Commerce and Industry, Kenya.
- Chief Haroun Msabila Lugusha, Chief of Sikonge, Tanganyika.
- Joseph Olatunde Macaulay, Land Officer, Land Department, Federation of Nigeria.
- George Davis Mclean, MRCS, LRCP, Medical Officer, St. Kitts, Leeward Islands.
- John Edward Madocks, District Officer, Northern Rhodesia.
- James Maxwell. For public services in Kenya.
- Thomas Chike Mbanefo, Administrative Officer, Eastern Region, Nigeria.
- Carlton Paton Browne Melbourne. For public services in British Guiana.
- Thirunilathil Krishna Menon, Provincial Office Superintendent, Tanganyika.
- Mohamed Abdulla Mir, lately Clerk, East African Railways and Harbours Administration.
- Barbara Edith Moore, Senior Woman Education Officer, Nyasaland.
- Tito Mudanye, County Chief, Pollisa County, Bugisu District, Uganda.
- Pandurang Gopal Muley, Assistant Superintendent, Secretariat, Tanganyika.
- Sydney Douglas Gun-Munro, MB, Resident Surgeon, Colonial Hospital, St. Vincent, Windward Islands.
- Alfred Murray, Superintendent, of Works, Public Works Department, Sierra Leone.
- Veluppillai Muthucumarasamy, Chief Clerk, Customs and Excise Department, Federation of Malaya.
- Ahmet Niazi, Assistant Superintendent of Police, Cyprus.
- Chief Johnson Osuji Njemanze. For public services in the Eastern Region, Nigeria.
- Chief Jackson Emomake Obaseki. For public services in the Western Region, Nigeria.
- Frank Julian Odle, Labour Commissioner, Antigua, Leeward Islands.
- Chief Aina Onabolu. For services to art and education in the Federation of Nigeria.
- Ong Kim Chuan, Senior Civil Liaison Officer, Federation of Malaya.
- Chief Raymond Ogaji Orem. For public services in the Eastern Region, Nigeria.
- Geoffrey James Ward Pedraza, MC, District Commissioner, Nyeri, Kenya.
- Gregory Muthiah Pillai, lately Legal Assistant, Tanganyika.
- Punniamoorthy Ponnampalam, Special Grade Technical Assistant (Topographical), Survey Department, Federation of Malaya.
- Joan Priest. For British Red Cross Services in Kenya.
- Hussein Allarakhai Rahim, Registrar, High Court, Zanzibar.
- Harry William Reeves, Cocoa Officer, Western Region, Nigeria.
- Josephus Vidal Thomas Richards, Inspector of Works, Public Works Department, Western Region, Nigeria.
- Edward Rowley Richardson, Senior Assistant Controller of Telecommunications, Federation of Nigeria.
- Isaiah Robinson Rolle, JP. For public services in the Bahamas.
- Jacob Oladele Ogaibi Samuel. For public services in the Western Region, Nigeria.
- Gabriel Percy Savage, lately Education Officer, Federation of Nigeria.
- Victor Gordon Buchanan Scott, Senior Supervisor, Agricultural Production and Marketing Board, Nyasaland.
- Vera Riolene Shaw, Head Teacher, Jamaica.
- Nancy Eleanor Shepherd, Assistant Commissioner for Community Development (Women), Kenya.
- George Sims, Rector, Royal College, Mauritius.
- Arthur Ransome Smith, Storekeeper, Department of Lands and Surveys, Tanganyika.
- Tan Siew Inn. For public services in Singapore.
- Tan Yam Thong, Chief Registrar, Supreme Court, Sarawak.
- Alexander Taylor, Veterinary Officer, Department of Veterinary Services and Animal Industry, Uganda.
- Lieutenant-Colonel William Edward Terry, lately Camp Commandant, Prisons Service, Kenya.
- Thien Tet Fui, lately Chinese Assistant Officer, Department of Labour and Welfare, North Borneo.
- Lawrence Blackwood Thompson, District Commissioner, Local Government Department, British Guiana.
- Ethel Lily May Thorpe, Queen Elizabeth Overseas Nursing Service, Matron, Mental Hospital, Jamaica.
- Lelia James Tomlinson, Supervisor, Social Welfare Commission, Jamaica.
- Un Po, Lecturer in Physics, The University of Hong Kong.
- Jacob Charles Vouza, GM. For public services in the British Solomon Islands Protectorate.
- Stanley William Mukholi Wanambwa, Secretary-General, Bugisu District Council, Uganda.
- Charles Vivian Leslie Westergreen, Assistant Secretary to the Government, Seychelles.
- Samson Wikina, Senior Interpreter, Eastern Region, Nigeria.
- Joy Mary Williams, Queen Elizabeth Overseas Nursing Service, Senior Health Sister, Northern Region, Nigeria.
- Richard Selvanayagam Williams. For services to education in Singapore.
- Lilyan May Yung. For social welfare services in Singapore.

Honorary Members

- Too Chee Chew, Information Officer, Federation of Malaya.
- Wong Yong Hew, JP. For public services in Perak, Federation of Malaya.
- Henry Perera, Chief Superintendent of Posts, Kuala Lumpur, Federation of Malaya.
- Thambapillai Magasu, Headmaster, Batu Road English School, Kuala Lumpur, Federation of Malaya.
- Gnanasigamony Samuel Rajaiah, lately Assistant Traffic Superintendent, Malayan Railways, Kuala Lumpur, Federation of Malaya.

=== Order of the Companions of Honour (CH) ===
- The Very Reverend John Baillie. Lately Professor of Divinity, Principal of New College, and Dean of the Faculty of Divinity, University of Edinburgh.

=== British Empire Medal (BEM) ===
Military Division

Royal Navy

- Quartermaster Sergeant Frank Agass, Po.X3381, Royal Marines.
- Chief Yeoman of Signals George Andrews, P/JX.140462.
- Chief Petty Officer Edward John Boissel, P/J.48673.
- Colour Sergeant Charles Henry Bowden, Po.X.5533, Royal Marines.
- Able Seaman Leonard Brown, C/JX.159482.
- Electrical Artificer 1st Class Lewis Dobson, C/MX.96858.
- Chief Aircraft Artificer Ronald Frederick John Gattrell, L/FX.75046.
- Chief Petty Officer Reginald William Emmanuel Gilbert, D/J.52697.
- Quartermaster Sergeant Frank Henry Hardy, Po.X.2130, Royal Marines.
- Chief Petty Officer Herbert Henry Hicks, D/JX.130153.
- Aircrewman I Charles Joseph Herbert Homer, DSM, L/FX.79409.
- Stores Chief Petty Officer (V) Frederick Arthur Jarrett, P/MX.59646.
- Engine Room Artificer 3rd Class Harold John Johnston, P/MX.803689.
- Chief Petty Officer Steward Ah Sett Lam, Hong Kong O1920.
- Chief Electrical Artificer Sidney Richard Lamswood, D/MX.52953.
- Chief Petty Officer Nicola Mangani, Malta/JX.145938.
- Radio Electrical Artificer 2nd Class Harold Desmond Nunney, C/MX.101551.
- Chief Petty Officer Laurence James O'Flaherty, D/JX.137515.
- Sick Berth Petty Officer James Osborne, DSM, C/MX.76454.
- Chief Petty Officer Joseph Phillips, D/J.108557.
- Ordnance Mechanic 2nd Class Frederick Ernest Pulham, C/MX.754492.
- Chief Engine Room Artificer Arthur John Redman, P/MX.49522.
- Chief Engine Room Artificer Henry Edgar Russell, C/MX.48432.
- Master-at-Arms John Foster Spence, P/MX.801659.
- Chief Engine Room Artificer James Edwin Thompson, P/MX.51516.
- Chief Aircraft Artificer Charles Henry Trewhela, L/FX.75152.
- Petty Officer Cook (S) Albert John Simpson Wallace, C/MX.808008.
- Stores Chief Petty Officer (S) Albert Louis Willcocks, P/M.39630.
- Chief Engine Room Artificer William Edward Williams, D/MX.51292.
- Chief Blacksmith Albert Edward Wood, C/MX.46445.
- Chief Petty Officer Telegraphist Mohamed Yasin bin Endot, Malayan Royal Naval Volunteer Reserve.

Army

- 5251180 Staff-Sergeant Alfred Amphlett, Corps of Royal Electrical and Mechanical Engineers.
- Corporal Noel Conde Barretto, The Hong Kong Regiment.
- 19186714 Warrant Officer Class II (acting) George Ernest Benz, Corps of Royal Electrical and Mechanical Engineers.
- 2548745 Staff-Sergeant Harold Boyd, Corps of Royal Electrical and Mechanical Engineers.
- 4076064 Warrant Officer Class II (acting) James Boyle, Corps of Royal Electrical and Mechanical Engineers.
- 5681958 Sergeant Leslie Joseph Bruce, Royal Regiment of Artillery.
- 21182022 Squadron Quartermaster-Sergeant John Cassels, Royal Corps of Signals.
- 22304480 Squadron Quartermaster-Sergeant John Daw, Royal Corps of Signals.
- 14480820 Warrant Officer Class II (local) Gordon Douglas Denholm, 4th Queen's Own Hussars, Royal Armoured Corps.
- 7886577 Sergeant Leslie Demon Dennis, Royal Tank Regiment, Royal Armoured Corps.
- NA/500577 Sergeant Rays Mathews Dumuje, The Queen's Own Nigeria Regiment, Royal West African Frontier Force.
- 14441378 Colour-Sergeant George Easter, The Worcestershire Regiment.
- 22298638 Sergeant James Grant, Corps of Royal Electrical and Mechanical Engineers, Territorial Army.
- ER/6982824 Sergeant (acting) Victor Gray, The Royal Inniskilling Fusiliers.
- 47386 Sergeant Robert Halpin, The Parachute Regiment, Territorial Army.
- GC14959 Regimental Sergeant-Major Felix Hammond, Gold Coast Military Education Service.
- 22232488 Sergeant Percy Arthur Hardy, Corps of Royal Electrical and Mechanical Engineers.
- 14458912 Sergeant Dennis Madden Hassell, 4th Queen's Own Hussars, Royal Armoured Corps.
- WI/966 Colour-Sergeant (acting) Alfred Matthias Higgins, The Jamaica Regiment.
- 2648265 Colour-Sergeant Alfred Charles Hornsby, Irish Guards.
- T/176478 Warrant Officer Class II (acting) William Edward Hyland, Royal Army Service Corps.
- 2714747 Sergeant (local) Charles Johnson, Irish Guards.
- 22271057 Sergeant Joseph Johnson, Army Catering Corps, Territorial Army, attached The South Staffordshire Regiment, Territorial Army.
- 21003439 Staff-Sergeant (Artillery Clerk) Stanley Jones, Royal Regiment of Artillery, Territorial Army.
- S/154502 Staff-Sergeant (acting) Alexander Matheson Kerr, Royal Army Service Corps.
- S/19124132 Warrant Officer Class II (acting) Arthur George King, Royal Army Service Corps.
- 22810761 Staff-Sergeant (Artillery Clerk) Kenneth Linton, Royal Regiment of Artillery, Territorial Army.
- 798399 Battery Quartermaster-Sergeant Thomas Lloyd, Royal Regiment of Artillery.
- 14242655 Sergeant Arnold Longford, Corps of Royal Engineers.
- 2584994 Squadron Quartermaster-Sergeant Roy William McDonald, Royal Corps of Signals, Territorial Army.
- 1948703 Staff-Sergeant Michael James McGarry, Corps of Royal Engineers.
- 2076963 Sergeant John Perry McGaw, Corps of Royal Engineers.
- 13111631 Sergeant James McMahon, Royal Pioneer Conps.
- 21002677 Staff-Sergeant (Artillery Clerk) Eric George Newton, Royal Regiment of Artillery.
- NA/147985 Sergeant Ene Udo Okon, The Queen's Own Nigeria Regiment, Royal West African Frontier Force.
- 14185373 Colour-Sergeant Anthony Patrick Parkin, The West Yorkshire Regiment (The Prince of Wales's Own).
- W/12234 Sergeant Barbara Pearson, Women's Royal Army Corps.
- 851587 Battery Quartermaster-Sergeant (acting) George Regan, Royal Regiment of Artillery.
- 22810705 Sergeant (acting) Alfred Smith, Royal Regiment of Artillery.
- 14476433 Warrant Officer Class II (local) Peter Charles Roland Soper, The Middlesex Regiment (Duke of Cambridge's Own), attached The King's African Rifles.
- 14697996 Staff-Sergeant (acting) Bertrand Douglas Stephens, Corps of Royal Engineers.
- S/14449446 Staff-Sergeant John Mackenzie Steven, Royal Army Service Corps.
- 14465711 Staff-Sergeant (acting) William Herbert Stevens, Corps of Royal Electrical and Mechanical Engineers.
- 3052863 Colour-Sergeant (acting) William Thomson, The Queen's Own Cameron Highlanders.
- 22810918 Sergeant Arthur Ernest Whittington, Royal Regiment of Artillery, Territorial Army.
- 22833819 Battery Quartermaster-Sergeant Charles Henry Whittington, Royal Regiment of Artillery, Territorial Army.

Royal Air Force

- 543455 Flight Sergeant Phillip Edward Dewsbury.
- 518688 Flight Sergeant Malcolm Frederick Corum Downie.
- 1151758 Flight Sergeant Harold Farrow.
- 1750379 Flight Sergeant Gordon Llewellyn Fisher.
- 525121 Flight Sergeant Alfred Roy Freeman.
- 535399 Flight Sergeant Louis William Grimson.
- 620415 Flight Sergeant Leslie Heaword.
- 2659158 Flight Sergeant Marion Pearson Hennessey, Women's Royal Auxiliary Air Force.
- 570601 Flight Sergeant John Houston.
- 545853 Flight Sergeant Harold Ernest Jeffries.
- 562568 Flight Sergeant Norman Johns.
- 564037 Flight Sergeant John Patrick Murphy.
- 514735 Flight Sergeant (now Master Coxwain) George Albert Wyeth Peters.
- 591593 Flight Sergeant Leo Frederick Pollard.
- 573965 Flight Sergeant Douglas John Roden.
- 571890 Flight Sergeant Conyers Rutter.
- 2685546 Flight Sergeant Sydney Tuckerman, Royal Auxiliary Air Force.
- 565395 Flight Sergeant (now Acting Warrant Officer) John William Westhead.
- 525859 Flight Sergeant George William Henry Weston.
- 1636097 Flight Sergeant Alexander John Winterflood.
- 560257 Chief Technician Oakeley William Clinton.
- 509939 Acting Flight Sergeant Albert Edward Catling.
- 643283 Acting Flight Sergeant Gordon Stanley Crisp.
- 2063132 Acting Flight Sergeant Lorna Beatrice Griffiths, Women's Royal Air Force.
- 568637 Acting Flight Sergeant Peter Meyrick Salter.
- 552953 Acting Flight Sergeant Douglas Ronald Schofield.
- 579452 Sergeant Patrick Thomas Allmond.
- 527481 Sergeant Ronald Harold Ambler.
- 4011890 Sergeant Edward George Albert Braden.
- 4011336 Sergeant Charles Cecil James Castle.
- 927818 Sergeant Charles Horatio Cowley.
- 548293 Sergeant Ernest Thomas Crabb.
- 619605 Sergeant William James Findlay.
- 548932 Sergeant Kenneth Douglas Flatt.
- 534614 Sergeant Charles Henry Forbes.
- 1683197 Sergeant William Johnston.
- 1910771 Sergeant Patrick Moloney.
- 578370 Sergeant John William Moles.
- 1454213 Sergeant Cyril Kenneth Smith.
- 610017 Sergean-t Robert Stanley Spoors.
- 1132290 Sergeant Arthur Patrick Summers.
- 573133 Senior Technician Arthur Edwin Haggas.
- 4034161 Corporal Peter James Seddon.
- 582189 Corporal Dennis William Weymouth.
- 3514560 Corporal David Michael Wood.
- 4011302 Corporal Technician Charles Henry Martin.

Civil Division

United Kingdom

- Harry Joseph Allsop, JP, Sub-Postmaster, Rolvenden, Sub-Office, Cranbrook.
- Charles William James Almond, Overseer, Telegraph Manager's Office, General Post Office. (Wembley).
- Frederick Ansley, Principal Foreman of Stores, No. 7 Maintenance Unit, RAF Quedgeley. (Gloucester).
- Horace William Archer, Hospital Chief Officer, Class 1, HM Prison, Parkhurst.
- Daisy Armitage, Commandant, Ayton Detachment, British Red Cross Society. (Scarborough).
- William Frederick Armsby, Foreman Fitter, Great Ouse River Board. (Cambridge).
- Sidney Frank Austen, Signal Instructor (Pensioner), Admiralty Merchant Navy Signal School, London. (Hornchurch, Essex).
- Violet Ruth Ayres, Stewardess, SS Alcantara, Royal Mail Lines Ltd. (Southsea).
- Frank Baird, Donkeyman/Greaser, SS Fanad Head, Head Line & Lord Line. (Belfast).
- Herbert Stanley Baker, Permanent Labourer, Port of London Authority. (Barkingside, Essex).
- William Henry Ball, General Assistant, Birkenhead Undertaking, North Western Gas Board.
- Annie Beadle, lately Housemother, Beecholme Children's Home. (London).
- George Edward Beaney, Deputy, Horden Colliery, Durham Division, National Coal Board.
- Ethel Benge, Deputy Canteen Manageress, Royal Naval Store Depot, Cricklewood. (Stanmore, Middlesex).
- Daniel Bennett, Underground Stoneman, South Hetton Colliery, Durham Division, National Coal Board.
- Albert Berry, Belt Weaver, F. Reddaway & Co. Ltd.. (Manchester).
- Olive Birch, Chief of Welfare Section, Meridian Ltd., Nottingham.
- William Andrew Bosworthick, Assistant Staff Foreman, J. I. Thornycroft & Co. Ltd., Southampton.
- Percy Bradley, Assistant Manager, Hadfields Ltd., Sheffield.
- Edith Brampton, Honorary Collector, Street Savings Group, Stratford-upon-Avon.
- Christopher Baskin Briggs, Leader, Snowdon Mountain Rescue Organisation.
- William David Bruce, High Tension Jointer, South of Scotland Electricity Board. (Glasgow).
- Robert Buchanan, Chief Lighthouse Keeper, Clyde Lighthouses Trust. (Gourock).
- John Buck, Mains Foreman, North Western Electricity Board. (Manchester).
- Captain Richard Dawson Busk, Assistant Commandant, Dorset Special Constabulary. (Dorchester).
- Raymond Nayler Buxton, Chief Inspector, Staffordshire Constalbulary. (Stafford).
- Dorothy Mary Carder, Supervisor (Telephones), Head Post Office, Bath.
- Charles Edwin Caterer, Chief Paper Keeper, Ministry of Pensions and National Insurance. (Blackpool).
- John Chadwick, Rescue Worker, Benwell Tower Rescue Station, Durham Division, National Coal Board. (Newcastle upon Tyne).
- Florence Ethel Chatfield, Honorary Collector, Savings Groups, Conway.
- Eleanor Eliza Chudley, Voluntary Teacher of Handicrafts, HM Prison, Exeter. (Exeter).
- Charles Climo, Works Foreman, Bodmin, South Western Gas Board.
- Douglas Benjamin Cockman, Stores Superintendent, Technical Sub-Depot, War Office. (Ruislip).
- John Code, Head Range Warden, Altoar Rifle Range, Lancashire. (Altcar).
- John Albert Cook, Maintenance Engineer, Submarine Cables Ltd., Erith. (London).
- George Christopher Corp, Leading Hand Labourer, Osborne, Ministry of Works. (East Cowes, Isle of Wight).
- Victor Harry Crozier, Honorary Collector for National Savings, Vickers Armstrong Ltd., Barrow-in-Furness.
- William John Cutts, Inspector, Telephone Manager's Office, Centre Area, London.
- James Lucas Doughty, Turbine Driver, Birchills Power Station, Midlands Division, Central Electricity Authority. (Walsall).
- Tom Dove, Inspector (Postal), Head Post Office, Scarborough.
- John Edward Downing, Chargehand Inspector, Ferranti Ltd., Manchester. (Oldham).
- James Dyer, Site Works Manager, Sir Robert McAlpine & Sons Ltd.. (Hornchurch, Essex).
- Harry Eady, Inspector, West Sussex Constabulary. (Worthing).
- Franklyn Ernest Lane Easter, Assistant County Chief Warden, Civil Defence, Glamorgan.
- Francis Edward Eastley, Chief Messenger, Her Majesty's Embassy, Washington.
- Herbert Edwards, Livestock Markets Drover, Norwich.
- Arthur George Elliott, Skip Hoist Operator, Southern Gas Board. (Southampton).
- Sidney Ernest Elliott, Foreman of Trades, No. 72 Maintenance Unit, RAF, Roade. (Northampton).
- Harold Evans, Engineer and Manager, Newtown Undertaking, Wales Gas Board.
- John Cooper Field, Head Foreman Painter, Harland & Wolff, Belfast.
- Edward Fleming, Head Foreman, Vickers-Armstrong Ltd., Barrow.
- Frederick John Franklin, Chargehand Labourer, Coventry Power Station, East Midlands Division, Central Electricity Authority. (Coventry).
- Roderick Fraser, Police Sergeant, Inverness Constabulary. For mountain rescue work on Ben Nevis.
- William Frewin, Technical Works Officer (Grade IV), Forest Products Research Laboratory, Department of Scientific and Industrial Research. (Princes Risborough).
- George Fulton, Officer in Charge, Civil Defence Rescue Section, Kirkcaldy.
- Francis Joseph Galbraith, Manager, Assembly Shop, Seddon Diesel Vehicles Ltd., Oldham.
- Edgar Gethin Gale, Foreman Erector, Strachan & Henshaw Ltd., Bristol.
- George Fraser Gamble, School Staff Instructor, CranleighSchool, Surrey.
- Henry Lloyd Garrett, Laboratory Mechanic, National Physical Laboratory, Department of Scientific and Industrial Research. (Norbiton, Surrey).
- Matthew Gemmell, Boring Mill Operator, G. & J. Weir Ltd., Glasgow.
- Stanley Curtis George, Sub-Postmaster, Earlsfield Sub-Post Office, London.
- Edward Girvin, Sub-District Commandant, Ulster Special Constabulary. (Belfast).
- Frederick William Gosney, Skilled Aircraft Fitter, Blackburn & General Aircraft Ltd., Brough. (Goole).
- Annie Gould, Bath Attendant, Nursing Services Division, Public Health Department, Manchester.
- Alexandra Gray, Home Help, Family Help Service, Kent County Council. (Dartford).
- Frederick Green Head Servant RAF College, Cranwell.
- John Groom. For public services in Much Hadham, Hertfordshire.
- Thomas Hakesley, Chargehand (Tool and Model Maker), Royal Aircraft Establishment, Ministry of Supply. (Reading).
- Herbert Hall, Assistant Civil Defence Officer, Oldham. (Blackpool).
- James Douglas Hall, Foreman Post Office Factory, Birmingham.
- John Harris, Preventive Officer, Plymouth, Board of Customs and Excise.
- Norman Edward Harvey Technician, Foreign Office. (Cheltenham).
- Louie Hayton, lately Deputy County Borough Organiser, Newcastle, Women's Voluntary Services.
- Jane Herron, Honorary Collector, Savings Groups, Chester-le-Street.
- Harry Fleetwood Hewitt, Skilled Machinist, Veritys Ltd., Birmingham.
- James Leslie Hibbert, Custodian, Earl's and Bishop's Palaces at Kirkwall, Orkney Isles.
- Francis Roland Hiden, Overseer, Head Post Office, Birmingham.
- William George Holborough, Chargehand, Strachan & Company Ltd., Stroud.
- Wilfred Horrex, Boatswain, SS Jason, Alfred Holt & Company.
- Grace Hunter, Member, Women's Voluntary Services, Aberdeen.
- John Jack, Horizontal Borer Operator, Rolls-Royce Ltd., Glasgow. (Renfrew).
- Thomas Hart Jackson, Head Timekeeper, Clyde Paper Co. Ltd., Glasgow.
- Charles Benjamin James, DCM, Centre Lathe Operator, Shelvoke & Drewry Ltd.. (Letchworth Hertfordshire).
- Bernard Jarrett, Technician, Foreign Office. (London).
- Reginald Victor Jarvis, Pipe Fitter, Wolverhampton District, West Midlands Gas Board.
- George Eric Jennings, Substation Attendant, Merseyside and North Wales Electricity Board. (Liverpool).
- Albert Frederick John, Master, Breaksea Light Vessel, Corporation of Trinity House. (Swansea).
- Richard Johnson, Chief Messenger at the Mansion House, City of London.
- Edward Joseph pram Jones, First Baker, SS Orsova, Orient Steam Navigation Company. (Whitstable).
- Gertrude Agnes Frances Keeble, Honorary Collector, Park Road Savings Group, Blockley, Gloucestershire.
- Robert Keech, Technician I, Bowes Park Installation Office, General Post Office. (London).
- Thomas Kemp, Honorary Collector, Savings Group, British United Shoe Machinery Co. Ltd.. (Leicester).
- Lewis Andrews Killick, lately Chief Warder, British Museum. (Hastings).
- George Arthur Latter, Chief Inspector, War Department Constabulary, Ministry of Supply, Woolwich.
- Margaret Penny Law, Leader, Church of Scotland Canteen, Kinloss. (New Pitsligo, Aberdeenshire).
- Percy Legge, Charge Hand R. & E. Mechanic, Atomic Energy Research Establishment, Harwell. (Wantage).
- Frederick Bassett Lovett, Shipping Foreman, Mobil Oil Co. Ltd.. (Wallington, Surrey).
- Edwin McArdle, Coal Appliance Driver, Engineer's Department, Mersey Docks and Harbour Board. (Liverpool).
- Robert Willis McCombe, Honorary Collector, Local Savings Group, Portballintrae, County Antrim.
- James McDaid, MM, Head Attendant, National Gallery of Scotland. (Edinburgh).
- Alexander Macindeor, Member, Coast Life Saving Corps and Volunteer-in-Charge, Port Charlotte LSA Company.
- James Petrie McIntyre, Station Officer, Glasgow Fire Brigade.
- David Hamilton McKendrick, Handyman, Glengonnar Residential Camp School. (Leadhills).
- Lachlan Mackinnon. For mountain rescue work on Ben Nevis. (Fort William).
- William Joseph John Marks, Non-Technical Grade II, Proof and Experimental Establishment, Woolwich, Ministry of Supply. (London).
- James William Mason, Allowance Deliverer, Watchgate Sub Post Office, Kendal.
- Bertie Matthews, Postman, Higher Grade, Par, Cornwall.
- James Henry Matthews, Labour Officer, Monsanto Chemicals Ltd., Newport.
- Harry May, Sub-Officer, Berkshire and Reading Fire Brigade. (Ascot).
- John Joseph Meehan, GM, Chief Officer, Class I, HM Prison, Wormwood Scrubs.
- William Miller, Chargeman of Skilled Labourers, Admiralty Gunnery Equipment Depot, Glasgow.
- John William Mills, Working Manager, Wooler Gas Undertaking, Northern Gas Board.
- Edith Marlin Minter, Chief Supervisor, Pinner Telephone Exchange, General Post Office. (Harrow).
- Leslie George Mitchell, Canteen Manager, Navy, Army and Air Force Institutes, Headquarters Ship, Chatham Division, Reserve Fleet. (Chatham).
- George Andrew Muirhead, Inspector of Postmen, Head Post Office, Dumfries.
- Ernest Frederick Neve, Foreman, Submerged Repeater Manufacturing Shop, Standard Telephones & Cables Ltd., London.
- Paul Douglas Niekirk, Chief Observer, Post 5/A4, No. 5 Group, Royal Observer Corps. (London).
- William Ewart Nock, Yard Master, Frodingham, Eastern Region, British Railways, British Transport Commission. (Scunthorpe).
- Thomas O'Brien, Leading Hand, Royal Ordnance Factory, Blackburn, Ministry of Supply.
- Gerald Luke Padden, Chief Civil Defence Warden, Northern Area of County Durham. (Durham).
- Roy Albert William Pantenay, Technician I, Engineer-in-Chiefs Office, General Post Office. (Eastbourne).
- William Parker, Underground Pump Attendant, Woodside Colliery, East Midlands Division, National Coal Board. (Newthorpe).
- Johnston Patrick, Superintendent, Edinburgh Home for Working Lads.
- Ruth Parcell Paveley, Supervisor, Carter, Stabler & Adams Ltd.. (Parkstone, Dorset).
- Alexander Treglohan Paynter, Member, Civil Defence Ambulance and Casualty Collecting Section, Portsmouth. (Southsea).
- Hubert Peacock, Maintenance Engineer, Aycliffe Trading Estate, Darlington.
- George Thomas Pearce, Research and Development Craftsman, Special, Royal Aircraft Establishment, Ministry of Supply. (Farnborough).
- Frank Pears, Head Gardener, French District, Imperial War Graves Commission.
- James William Ewing Pearson, Electrician, Highland District, War Office. (Stirling).
- Edward Vernon Teft Perrins, Technical Officer, Post Office Research Station, London. (Wembley).
- Charalambos Pitsillides, Clerk, Grade A, War Department, Cyprus.
- George Powell, Vehicle Mechanic, North Eastern Electricity Board. (Wallsend).
- Brinley Rees, Plough Captain, Lewis Merthyr Colliery, South Western Division, National Coal Board. (Rhondda).
- Captain Richard Mervyn Edmund Reeves, Commandant, Somerset Special Constabulary. (Bristol).
- Walter Reginald Restall, Male Nursing Assistant-in-Charge, Sick Berth, Royal Naval College, Dartmouth.
- George William Rockliffe, Chief Observer, No. 20 Group Operations Room, Royal Observer Corps. (York).
- Martin Routledge, JP, Road Repairer, Hickleton Colliery, North Eastern Division, National Coal Board. (Rotherham).
- Arthur William Rowley, Foreman, The General Electric Co. Ltd., Wembley. (Greenford).
- William Henry Searle, Fisherman-Collector, Marine Biological Association, Plymouth.
- Thomas William Shaw, JP, Collier, Gomersal Colliery, North Eastern Division, National Coal Board. (Liversedge).
- George Shooter. For services to Boy's Clubs in Kingston-upon-Hull.
- Percy Frederick Smith, Office Keeper, Grade II, Ministry of Labour and National Service. (London).
- Reginald Smithers, Senior Foreman, Cooke, Troughton & Simms Ltd., York.
- Frederick William Spatchett, Assistant Divisional Officer, London Fire Brigade.
- Frederick Spearey, Inspector, Telephone Manager's Office, Cardiff.
- Ernest Stock, Deputy, Tilmanstone Colliery, South Eastern Division, National Coal Board. (Eythorne, Kent).
- John Stoddart, Surface Foreman, Polkemmet Colliery, Scottish Division, National Coal Board. (Whitburn).
- George Marwood Stout, Civil Defence Controller, Morpeth Rural District.
- Edward Louis Stanley Sylvester, Chargeman of Patternmakers, Chief Engineer's Department, HM Dockyard, Simonstown.
- Henry Eugene Taylor, Nursing Assistant Class I, Horton Hospital, Epsom.
- Samuel Taylor, Datal Worker, North Walbottle Colliery, Northern (N & C) Division, National Coal Board. (Newcastle upon Tyne).
- Thomas Alfred Farrell Taylor, Chief Office Keeper, War Office. (London).
- Arthur Proctor Tisdall, Inspector, Metropolitan Police Force. (London).
- Hugh Mawhinney Todd, Head Messenger, Ministry of Agriculture for Northern Ireland.
- William George Turner, Supervisory Instructor Grade I, RAF Technical College, Henlow. (Arlesey, Bedfordshire).
- Edwin Wainwright, Salvage Worker, Darfield Main Colliery, North Eastern Division, National Coal Board. (Barnsley).
- Albert Edward Watkins, Collier, Cannop Colliery, South Western Division, National Coal Board. (Coleford).
- Og West, Auxiliary Postman, Pateley Bridge Sub-Office, Yorkshire.
- William Harry Weston, Bridge Inspector, Western Region, British Railways. (Bath).
- Alfred Clement White, Chief Machine Room Overseer, Birmingham Post & Mail Ltd.
- Frank Whitehead, Journeyman Plater, Cochrane & Sons Ltd., Selby.
- Jane Willan, Assistant to County Borough Organiser, Barrow-in-Furness, Women's Voluntary Services.
- Albert Clifford Williams, Repairer, Rose Heyworth Colliery, South Western Division, National Coal Board. (Blaina, Monmouthshire).
- David Williams, Tractor Driver, Denbigh Agricultural Executive Committee. (Denbigh).
- David Williams, lately Training Officer, Avon Colliery, South Western Division, National Coal Board. (Port Talbot).
- Clifford Willis, Chargehand Welder, Ferrybridge "A" Power Station, Yorkshire Division, Central Electricity Authority. (Leeds).
- Betty Woffenden, Personal Assistant, London Region, Women's Voluntary Services. (London).
- John Wood, JP, Gheckweighman, Wharncliffe Woodmoor 1, 2 & 3 Unit, North Eastern Division, National Coal Board. (Barnsley).
- Lawrence Wood, Foreman, Coal Shipping Department, River Wear Commissioners. (Sunderland).
- Robert Wills Woolley, Technical Class Grade II, Admiralty. (Newcastle upon Tyne).
- Frederick Ernest Wright, Gas Fitter, Loughborough Undertaking, East Midlands Gas Board.
- Lylian Ada Mary Wright, Honorary Collector, Street Savings Groups, Carshalton, Surrey.

Australia

- Francis Charles Williams, Information and Enquiry Officer, New South Wales Government Offices, London.
- Howard F. Bertram, Electrician, State of Victoria. For services in the preparations for the Olympic Games in Melbourne.
- Robert John Birney, Inspector, State of Victoria Police Force. For services relating to the Olympic Games in Melbourne.
- Lawrence Dundon, Plasterer, State of Victoria. For services in the preparations for the Olympic Games in Melbourne.
- John G. Gray, Painter, State of Victoria. For services in the preparations for the Olympic Games in Melbourne.
- William Holmes, Rigger and Dogman, State of Victoria. For services in the preparations for the Olympic Games in Melbourne.
- William Pewtress, Plumber, State of Victoria. For services in the preparations for the Olympic Games in Melbourne.
- William Arthur Poulter, Sergeant, State of Victoria Police Force. For services relating to the Olympic Games in Melbourne.
- Frank Saunders, Carpenter, State of Victoria. For services in the preparations for the Olympic Games in Melbourne.
- George Francis Chades Edmonds, Chamber Messenger, House of Assembly, State of South Australia.

Southern Rhodesia

- Percy Robert Frost, Sub-Inspector, British South Africa Police Reserve, Southern Rhodesia.

Overseas Territories

- James Adolphus Bradford, River Captain, Forest Department, British Guiana.
- Erasmus Cadwallader Moses Green, lately Sergeant, British Honduras Police Force.
- William Frederick Owers, Emergency Special Constable, Cyprus.
- Mohamed Aslam, Station Master, Tororo, East African Railways and Harbours Administration.
- Livingstone Nganda s/o Mdigos, Technical Assistant, East African Meteorological Department.
- Ramnath Badlu, Field Officer, Agricultural Department, Fiji.
- Silvanus Adjetey Otchwemah, Inspector, Gold Coast Police Force.
- Louis Wheatle, Ranger, Department of Agriculture, Jamaica.
- Eileen Louise Belcher, Inspector, Kenya Police Reserve.
- Ronald Belson, Chief Officer, Prisons Department, Kenya.
- Sospeter Chiira, Headman, Fort Hall Area, Kenya.
- Adano Dabasso, Senior Sergeant, Northern Province Tribal Police, Kenya.
- Frederick Mungai Gitakwe, Assistant District Officer, Kenya.
- Isaiah Mwai Mathenge, Rehabilitation Assistant, Ministry of Community Development, Kenya.
- Gilbert Owuor Okwato, Assistant Prison Officer, Thomson's Falls Prison and Detention Camp, Kenya.
- Dub Sharamu, Corporal, Northern Province Tribal Police, Kenya.
- Amat bin Singing, Forest Ranger, Forestry Department, Federation of Malaya.
- Eleanor Jean Baptist, Matron, Selangor Children's Home, Federation of Malaya.
- Darus bin Taib, Assistant Rural Development Officer, Larut and Matang, Perak, Federation of Malaya.
- Abdul Majid bin Haji Lassim, Health Inspector, Negri Sembilan, Federation of Malaya.
- Nandok bin Ahmad, lately Junior Technical Assistant, Central Telegraph Board, Federation of Malaya.
- Mohamed Noordin bin Mastan, Penghulu, Pulau Aman, Province Wellesley South, Federation of Malaya.
- P'Ang Chee, Kapala, Penang Hill Railway, Federation of Malaya.
- Sung Chiw Hoay, Staff Health Nurse, Cameron Highlands, Federation of Malaya.
- Tan Ah Gong, Police Clerk and Interpreter, Pahang, Federation of Malaya.
- Nkama Egwu Nkama, Meteorological Observer, Grade I, Meteorological Department, Federation of Nigeria.
- Vincent Ogo, Wireless Supervisor, Posts and Telegraphs Department, Federation of Nigeria.
- Moses Adekunle Oyeyinka, Radio Officer, Posts and Telegraphs Department, Federation of Nigeria.
- Garundole Adamu, Chief Inspector, Native Authority Police, Northern Region, Nigeria.
- Isaiah Kolawole, Medical Field Unit Inspector, Western Region, Nigeria.
- Spanner Pinlas Mathias, Assistant Inspector of Works, Public Works Department, Western Region, Nigeria.
- Benedict Stephens, Town Board Inspector, Medical Department, North Borneo.
- Guthrie Burnett Kadango, Clerk, Provincial and District Administration, Nyasaland.
- Gbana Fai, Senior Coxswain, Port of Sherbro Marine, Sierra Leone.
- Edward Valesius Richards, lately Foreman Fitter, Railways, Sierra Leone.
- Chee bin Mat, lately Revenue Officer, Customs and Excise Department, Singapore.
- Robleh Haji Suleban, Second Akil, Somaliland.
- Hemed Halfan Aziz, Trader, Pangani, Tanganyika.
- Mtema Towegale Kiwanga I, Mtema (Chief) of Uibena Ulanga District, Tanganyika.
- John Jane Mahyegu Lugaila, Secretary, Mwanza Native Treasury, Tanganyika.
- Austin Kapere Edward Shaba, Medical Assistant, Medical Department, Tanganyika.
- Peter Robert Blake, Chief Inspector, Trinidad Police Force.
- Cecile Calderon, Assistant Matron, Victoria Hospital, St. Lucia, Windward Islands.
- Leslie Deschamps, Superintendent of Telephones and Electrical Inspector, Telephone Department, Windward Islands.
- Donald Bernard Louisey, Agricultural Assistant, Agricultural Department, Grenada, Windward Islands.
- Carlton Leonard Miller, Chief Heavy Equipment Operator, Public Works Department, Dominica, Windward Islands.
- Robert Vanloo, lately Cocoa Officer, St. Vincent, Windward Islands.

=== Royal Victorian Medal (RVM) ===
In Silver

- Chief Petty Officer Steward Arthur Bourne, P/LX.20428.
- John Hubert Bowden.
- Joseph Walter Cooze.
- Chief Painter William Herbert John Dore, P/M39528.
- Edward Thomas Emmett.
- Robert Fitall, lately Police Sergeant, Metropolitan Police.
- 615879 Flight Sergeant Andrew Hart, Royal Air Force.
- 1920535 Sergeant Arthur Edward Horn, Royal Air Force.
- Harry Hubbard.
- James Duncan McDermott, lately Police Constable, Metropolitan Police.
- William McGregor.
- Robert Bell Nicol.
- Elizabeth Anne Saunders.
- John Allan Stewart.

=== Royal Red Cross (RRC) ===
- Sybilla Katherine Estella Richard, ARRC, Principal Matron, Queen Alexandra's Royal Naval Nursing Service.
- Lieutenant-Colonel Gertrude Mary Luxton, ARRC, (206272), Queen Alexandra's Royal Army Nursing Corps (now retired).
- Major Muriel Irene Newbury (206353), Queen Alexandra's Royal Army Nursing Corps.
- Wing Officer Helen Nicholas Brait Grierson, ARRC, (405064), Princess Mary's Royal Air Force Nursing Service.

==== Associate of the Royal Red Cross (ARRC) ====
- Barbara Boyd Williamson, Superintending Sister, Queen Alexandra's Royal Naval Nursing Service.
- Major Violet Annie Mary Mona Morgan (206336), Queen Alexandra's Royal Army Nursing Corps.
- Squadron Officer Christina Erskine Robertson (405724), Princess Mary's Royal Air Force Nursing Service.

=== Air Force Cross (AFC) ===
Royal Navy

- Lieutenant-Commander Colin McKeand Little.
- Lieutenant-Commander Desmond Mackenzie Steer.

Royal Air Force

- Wing Commander Cecil Anderson Alldis, DFC, (74657).
- Wing Commander Richard Frank Batram Powell (120937).
- Wing Commander Thomas Neville Stack (33455).
- Squadron Leader Laurence George Aggitt Bastard (142581).
- Squadron Leader John Nelson Bryson Boyd (182590).
- Squadron Leader Douglas Harry Chopping, DFC, (124862).
- Squadron Leader Edwin Terrance Cathcart Cunnison, DFC, Royal Rhodesian Air Force.
- Squadron Leader Alan David Dick (141539).
- Squadron Leader Edwin James George Flavell (56326) – for same act as Flight Lieutenant Eric Stacey.
- Squadron Leader Arthur Harper (57079).
- Squadron Leader David Leonard Hughes, DFC, (160189).
- Squadron Leader Michael Francis James Mathews (130953).
- Squadron Leader David Healy Tew (190161).
- Acting Squadron Leader Peter Edward Fahy, DFC, (178529).
- Flight Lieutenant Peter Edward Bairsto (202703).
- Flight Lieutenant Martinus Oelof Bergh (4016807).
- Flight Lieutenant Francis Antonin Bernard (120209).
- Flight Lieutenant John Donald Bradley (4015005).
- Flight Lieutenant Gerald Noah Brierley (502420).
- Flight Lieutenant Robert James Thomas Buchanan (193519).
- Flight Lieutenant Basil Walter Thomas Coomer (165955).
- Flight Lieutenant Dennis George Thomas Franklin (3501870).
- Flight Lieutenant Robert Edward Jefferies (1581445).
- Flight Lieutenant Evan Gwyn Jones, DFC, (145830).
- Flight Lieutenant Gerald Joseph Anthony Kerr (1609040).
- Flight Lieutenant Patrick Henry John Peters (3507088).
- Flight Lieutenant Edward John Shaw (58564).
- Flight Lieutenant John Edward Smith (501104).
- Flight Lieutenant Eric Stacey (578488) – for same act as Squadron Leader Ted Flavell.
- Flight Lieutenant John Stanley (500721).
- Flight Lieutenant Charles Cyril Verry (4016210).
- Flight Lieutenant Ivan Gerald Warren (3045949).
- Flying Officer Edward Vine (572437).

==== Bar to Air Force Cross ====
- Wing Commander Peter William Helmore, DFC, AFC, (89350).

=== Air Force Medal (AFM) ===
Royal Air Force

- 1566237 Flight Sergeant William Henry Black.
- 1372862 Flight Sergeant Thomas Currie.
- 1684438 Flight Sergeant Kenneth Dillon.
- 3127399 Flight Sergeant Graham Neil Franklin.
- 1593503 Flight Sergeant George Russell Lee.
- 1574556 Flight Sergeant Campbell James Bissett Murdoch.
- 3032716 Sergeant John Anthony McCubbin.
- 3510101 Sergeant Arthur Philip Tizzard.

=== Queen's Commendation for Valuable Service in the Air ===
United Kingdom

- Captain Roy Edgar Millichap, DFC, Flight Superintendent, Constellation Fleet, British Overseas Airways Corporation.
- Captain William Reginald Mitchell, Senior Captain, First Class, British European Airways.
- Captain Frank Wright Walton, DFC, Officer-in-Charge Training, Britannia Fleet, British Overseas Airways Corporation.

Royal Air Force

- Wing Commander Charles Cranston Calder, DSO, DFC, (62699).
- Wing Commander John Scotter Owen (41800).
- Wing Commander Robert Sidney Radley, DFC, AFC, (83263).
- Squadron Leader Charles Eric Butterworth (153337).
- Squadron Leader Timothy John McElhaw (58017).
- Squadron Leader Alan Edward Marriott (156652).
- Squadron Leader Peter Howard Langston Scott, AFC, (180447).
- Squadron Leader James Robert Tanner (196290).
- Squadron Leader George William Wray Waddington, DFC, (53427).
- Squadron Leader Charles Watkinson, DFC, AFC, (55069).
- Squadron Leader Kenneth Charles Wilson (162937).
- Flight Lieutenant Ronald George Frederick Ainsworth (1812469).
- Flight Lieutenant David William Edward Allum, DFC, (175918).
- Flight Lieutenant Robert John Howland Ansley (54861).
- Flight Lieutenant Allan Bountiff (1605345).
- Flight Lieutenant Alfred John Camp, AFC, (1395228).
- Flight Lieutenant Ernest Sydney Chandler, AFC, (3039492).
- Flight Lieutenant Thomas Matthew Coulson (1595877).
- Flight Lieutenant Philip Sidney Demmer (2498674).
- Flight Lieutenant Edward Ross Gordon (4015072).
- Flight Lieutenant Hubert Desmond Hall (200632).
- Flight Lieutenant Roy Harling, DFC, (56714).
- Flight Lieutenant Robert John Johnston (55558), Royal Auxiliary Air Force.
- Flight Lieutenant Henry Alexander Maule, AFC, (115782).
- Flight Lieutenant James Maxwell (125544).
- Flight Lieutenant David Ferrie Moffat (2600539).
- Flight Lieutenant Robert Herbert Mullineaux (3012854).
- Flight Lieutenant Kevin Thomas Anthony O'Sullivan, DFC, (127032).
- Flight Lieutenant Raymond Prest (195984).
- Flight Lieutenant John Victor Radice (3507289).
- Flight Lieutenant Alois Sedivy, DFC, DFM, (115517).
- Flight Lieutenant Robert Andrew Fraser Shields (203295).
- Flight Lieutenant Derek Alec Spackman (4036277).
- Flight Lieutenant Arthur Cedric Thornton (173794).
- Flying Officer William Houldsworth (2209733).
- Flying Officer William Geoffrey Kirkman (4040939).
- Flying Officer Philip Henry Warwick (1521706).
- Flying Officer Frank Edward Winch (2682542), Royal Auxiliary Air Force.
- Pilot Officer Charles Taylor (1808089).
- Master Pilot Sylwester Wieczorek (781163).
- Master Engineer Alan Eldridge (569450).
- 1608489 Flight Sergeant Roderick Harold Bunce.
- 1624916 Flight Sergeant Bernard Arthur Collen, DFM.
- 553716 Flight Sergeant Harold Anthony Harrison.
- 1890396 Flight Sergeant William Goodwin Holt.
- 1317139 Flight Sergeant Albert Harry Hopkins.
- 1040899 Flight Sergeant John Milfull.

=== Queen's Police Medal (QPM) ===
England and Wales

- Major Sir John Ferguson, CBE, Chief Constable, Kent Constabulary.
- John Fawke Skittery, OBE, Chief Constable, Plymouth City Police Force.
- James Joseph Scott, Chief Constable, Tynemouth Borough Police Force.
- Joseph William Goyder, Chief Superintendent, City of London Police.
- Francis Albert Seward, Commandant, No. 1 District Police Training Centre, Bruche (Seconded from Metropolitan Police).
- Cyril Kent Sim, Chief Superintendent and Deputy Chief Constable, Southend-on-Sea Borough Police Force.
- Harry Edward Boreham, MBE, MM, Chief Superintendent and Deputy Chief Constable, East Suffolk Constabulary.
- Frederick William Charles Pennington, Chief Superintendent, Metropolitan Police.
- David McDonald Wallace, Superintendent (Grade I), Metropolitan Police.
- Thomas Marsh, Superintendent and Deputy Chief Constable, Wolverhampton Borough Police Force.
- William Thomas Henry Pring Jones, Superintendent (Grade I), Metropolitan Police.

Scotland

- Robert Pithie, Chief Inspector, Scottish North Eastern Counties Constabulary.
- Hector Murchison, Chief Superintendent, City of Glasgow Police Force.

Northern Ireland

- Robert Hector Foots, District Inspector, Royal Ulster Constabulary.

Guernsey

- Albert Peter Lamy, BEM, Chief Officer, Island Police Force.

Australia

- Peter Roland Clifton, Superintendent 1st Class, New South Wales Police Force.
- Bruce Grigor, Superintendent 2nd Class, New South Wales Police Force.
- Jack Rayner, Superintendent 2nd Class, New South Wales Police Force.
- Milner Frederick Calman, Detective Superintendent 2nd Class, New South Wales Police Force.
- Jack Edwin Gribble, Superintendent 3rd Class, New South Wales Police Force.
- Norman Thomas William Allan, Inspector 1st Class, New South Wales Police Force.

Southern Rhodesia

- Lieutenant-Colonel Basil Gordon Spurling, Deputy Commissioner of the British South Africa Police.

Overseas Territories

- Arthur Leslie Abraham, MVO, Commissioner of Police, Gibraltar.
- Michael Ian Newnham Gordon, Assistant Commissioner of Police, Gold Coast.
- George Allan Rodney Wright-Nooth, Assistant Commissioner of Police, Hong Kong.
- John Noel Douglas Harrison, Senior Assistant Commissioner of Police, Federation of Malaya.
- Mohammed Salleh Bin Ismael, Assistant Commissioner of Police, Federation of Malaya.
- John Meade Helliwell, Deputy Commissioner of Police, Nyasaland.
- Peter Edward Turnbull, Deputy Commissioner, Sarawak Constabulary.

=== Queen's Fire Services Medal (QFSM) ===
England and Wales

- Alfred John Bridle, OBE, Chief Officer, West Sussex Fire Brigade.
- James Chalmers, Chief Officer, St. Helens Fire Brigade.
- William Tinmouth Taylor, Chief Officer, South Shields Fire Brigade.
- Thomas William Johnson, Divisional Officer, Buckinghamshire Fire Brigade.
- George Drury, OBE, Chief Officer, Plymouth Fire Brigade.

New Zealand

- Frederic Cowan Laidlaw, Chief Fire Officer, Dunedin Metropolitan Fire Brigade.
- Herbert Leslie Warner, Third Officer, Hawera Volunteer Fire Brigade.

Overseas Territory

- John Angus, Superintendent, Singapore Fire Brigade.

=== Colonial Police Medal (CPM) ===
Southern Rhodesia

- Frank Prentice Howes Dufton, Chief Inspector, British South Africa Police.
- Captain Kenneth Flower, MBE, British South Africa Police.
- Captain Kenneth Dudley Leaver, British South Africa Police.
- Majoni, Station Sergeant, British South Africa Police.
- Ndumela, Station Sergeant, British South Africa Police.
- Donald Anthony Stuteley, Chief Inspector, British South Africa Police.
- Sumpa, Detective Station Sergeant, British South Africa Police.
- Captain Herbert Dunsterville Van Niekerk, MBE, British South Africa Police.
- James Edwin Luyt Weller, Chief Inspector, British South Africa Police.
- Gerald Greystone Woodgate, Staff Chief Inspector, British South Africa Police.

Bechuanaland

- Terence Mortimer McDermott, Superintendent, Bechuanaland Protectorate Police Force.
- Jackson Makhaugenyane, Sergeant-Major, Bechuanaland Protectorate Police Force.

Overseas Territories

- Abdullah bin Awang, Senior Inspector, Federation of Malaya Police Force.
- Yoana Acire, Head Constable, Uganda Police Force.
- Philip Eyikinmiaghan Agbajoh, Assistant Superintendent, Nigeria Police Force.
- Ahmad bin Haji Yassin, Sergeant, Federation of Malaya Special Constabulary.
- Mustafa Ahmed, Sergeant, Cyprus Police Force.
- Alias bin Mat Darus, Detective Sergeant, Federation of Malaya Police Force.
- Robert Dokyi Ampaw, Superintendent, Gold Coast Police Force.
- Ariffin bin Hassan, Assistant Superintendent, Federation of Malaya Police Force.
- Fylactis Aristokleous, Sub-Inspector, Cyprus Police Force.
- Carl Benjamin Austin, Assistant Superintendent, British Guiana Police Force.
- Martin Kofi Awuku, Inspector Grade II, Gold Coast Police Force.
- James Patrick Beatt, MBE, Superintendent, Jamaica Constabulary.
- Seth Birokorang, Inspector Grade I, Gold Coast Police Force.
- Bryan John Bleasdale, Deputy Superintendent Singapore Police Force.
- Francis Harry George Bridgman, Superintendent, Kenya Police Force.
- Frederick Walsh Butler, Superintendent, Kenya Police Force.
- Graham Colvin Cairns, Assistant Superintendent, Tanganyika Police Force.
- Francis Chin Kee Lin, Probationary Inspector, Federation of Malaya Police Force.
- Christopher Francis Cobb, Senior Superintendent, Gold Coast Police Force.
- Thomas Edward Coton, Superintendent, Northern Rhodesia Police Force.
- Douglas David Pedler Cracknell, OBE, Assistant Commissioner, Kenya Police Force.
- Gedo Dagarti, Sergeant, Gold Coast Police Force.
- Douglas George Dixie, Superintendent, Sierra Leone Police Force.
- Felix Jehoiada Duke, Chief Inspector, Trinidad Police Force.
- Ferdinand Emelieze, Inspector Grade I, Nigeria Police Force.
- Ali Foum, Chief Inspector, Zanzibar Police Force.
- Moman Gama, Sergeant-Major, Nigeria Police Force.
- Brian William Frere Goodrich, Superintendent, Singapore Police Force.
- Musa Grumah, MM, Sergeant-Major, Gold Coast Police Force.
- Alan Leslie Hardy, Deputy Superintendent, Federation of Malaya Police Force.
- Stanley Hardy, Assistant Superintendent, Federation of Malaya Police Force.
- Hassan bin Bantot, Staff Sergeant, Singapore Police Force.
- Mohamed Ibrahim, Detective Sub-Inspector, Singapore Police Force.
- Jendol bin Mohamed Som, Sub-Inspector, Federation of Malaya Police Force.
- Howard Franklyn Jones, Acting Senior Superintendent, Kenya Police Force.
- Haji Abdul Kadir bin Haji Hassan, Superintendent, Federation of Malaya Police Force.
- Emmanuel Kamalu, Assistant Superintendent, Nigeria Police Force.
- Adamu Kanjarga, Sergeant, Gold Coast Police Force.
- Kwong Choi, Staff Sergeant I, Hong Kong Police Force.
- John Le Cain, Deputy Superintendent, Singapore Police Force.
- John Maunsell Le Mesurier, Superintendent, Nyasaland Police Force.
- John Littleton, Probationary Assistant Superintendent, Kenya Police Force.
- Lo Siu Ki, Staff Sergeant I, Hong Kong Police Force.
- Baramade Madei, Assistant Inspector, Kenya Police Force.
- Anthony Gerald Manley, Lieutenant, Federation of Malaya Police Force.
- Petero Mera, Head Constable Major, Uganda Police Force.
- Demetrios Michael, Detective Inspector, Cyprus Police Force.
- Saleh Abdulla Mohamed, Chief Inspector, Aden Police Force.
- Herbert Edgar Moore, Senior Assistant Commissioner, Tanganyika Police Force.
- Lionel Mootoo, Second Officer, Port of Spain Fire Brigade, Trinidad.
- Kiazin Nami, Assistant Superintendent, Cyprus Police Force.
- Kathuli Ndundo, Assistant Inspector, Kenya Police Force.
- Omari s/o Duncan, Sergeant, Tanganyika Police Force.
- David John Orme, Deputy Superintendent, Aden Police Force.
- Osman bin Allioho, Probationary Inspector, North Borneo Constabulary.
- Kemal Osman, Sergeant, Cyprus Police Force.
- Irven Modeste Phillips, Chief Officer, San Fernando Fire Brigade, Trinidad.
- Puteh bin Mohamed Noor, Sergeant, Federation of Malaya Police Force.
- Abdul Rahman bin Sulaiman, Junior Sub-Officer, Singapore Fire Brigade.
- Robert Jeffery Read, Superintendent, Northern Rhodesia Police Force.
- Ronald George Richardson, Superintendent, Kenya Police Force.
- Victor Rique, Inspector, Trinidad Police Force.
- Lionel Gladstone Roach, Chief Inspector, Trinidad Police Force.
- Leslie Rogers, Honorary Inspector, Federation of Malaya Auxiliary Police Force.
- Vincent Rose, Chief Inspector, British Guiana Police Force.
- Saibin bin Yatim, Sub-Inspector, Federation of Malaya Police Force.
- Salim bin Ahmad, Sergeant, Federation of Malaya Special Constabulary.
- Syed Ahmad Ali Shah, Inspector, Federation of Malaya Police Force.
- Gulmohamed Hamis Shapi, Inspector Grade I, Kenya Police Force.
- Edward Shawley, Deputy Superintendent, Federation of Malaya Police Force, now Superintendent, Bahamas Police Force.
- James Shoyemi, Sub-Inspector, Nigeria Police Force.
- Vallopillay Nadason Ratna Singam, Inspector, Singapore Police Force.
- Harchand Singh s/o Rur Singh, Senior Inspector, Federation of Malaya Police Force.
- Pertap Singh s/o Marain Singh, Detective Sub-Inspector, Federation of Malaya Police Force.
- David Sigismund Thompson, Chief Inspector, Sierra Leone Police Force.
- John Faulkner Trueman, Assistant Superintendent, Federation of Malaya Police Force.
- Shah Wali s/o Gulam Mohamed, Assistant Superintendent, Federation of Malaya Police Force.
- Cyril Alban Williams, Station Sergeant, St. Vincent Police Force, Windward Islands.
- Frank Bernard Williams, Superintendent, Nigeria Police Force.
- Llewellyn Arthur Wilson, Senior Superintendent, Uganda Police Force.
- Yuen Yuet Leng, Inspector, Federation of Malaya Police Force.
- Mohamed Yunus bin Ismail, Sub-Inspector, Federation of Malaya Police Force.
- Mohammed Yusup bin Din Mohamed, Inspector, North Borneo Constabulary.

== Australia ==
=== Knight Bachelor ===
- George James Coles, CBE, a Director of the National Bank of Australasia. For public services to the Commonwealth of Australia.
- The Honourable Josiah Francis, Australian Consul-General at New York; formerly Minister for the Navy and Minister for the Army in the Commonwealth of Australia.
- Lionel Alfred George Hooke, Managing Director of Amalgamated Wireless (Australasia). For services to the radio industry in Australia.
- Leslie Harold Martin, CBE, Professor of Physics at the University of Melbourne; Defence Scientific Adviser to the Government of the Commonwealth of Australia.
- Edwin Marsden Tooth, of Hamilton, Queensland. For public and philanthropic services in the Commonwealth of Australia.

=== Order of the Bath ===
==== Companion of the Order of the Bath (CB) ====
Military Division

- Air Vice-Marshal Ellis Charles Wackett, CBE, Royal Australian Air Force.

=== Order of Saint Michael and Saint George ===
==== Knight Grand Cross of the Order of St Michael and St George (GCMG) ====
- The Honourable Thomas Playford, Premier of South Australia since 1938; in recognition of his distinguished services in public affairs in Australia.

==== Companion of the Order of St Michael and St George (CMG) ====
- The Honourable Francis Heath Gallagher, a Member of the Industrial Commission of New South Wales. For public services to the Commonwealth of Australia.
- Robert Clarence Gibson, of Cremorne, New South Wales. For services to primary industry in the Commonwealth of Australia.
- John George Hunter, ChM, MB, General Secretary of the Federal Council of the British Medical Association in the Commonwealth of Australia.
- Ernest William Titterton, Professor of Nuclear Physics, Australian National University, Canberra.

=== Order of the British Empire ===
==== Knight Commander of the Order of the British Empire (KBE) ====
Military Division

- Vice-Admiral Roy Russell Dowling, CB, CBE, DSO.

Civil Division

- Leslie Galfreid Melville, CBE, Vice-Chancellor, Australian National University, Canberra. For public services.
- The Honourable William Francis Langer Owen, Judge of the Supreme Court of New South Wales. For public services to the Commonwealth of Australia.

==== Commander of the Order of the British Empire (CBE) ====
Military Division

- Surgeon Rear-Admiral Lionel Lockwood, MVO, DSC, MD, BS.
- Captain William Beresford Moffitt Marks, DSC, Royal Australian Navy.
- Major-General (temporary) Ronald Ramsay McNicoll (3/65), Australian Staff Corps.
- Group Captain William Arthur Charles Dale, DSO, Royal Australian Air Force.

Civil Division

- Captain George Urquhart Allan, AFC, Assistant General Manager, Qantas Empire Airways.
- Percival Landon Bazeley, OBE, Director of the Commonwealth Serum Laboratories.
- The Honourable John Markham Carter, MC, a Member of the Legislative Council of New South Wales. For public and political services to the Commonwealth of Australia.
- Thomas Garden Carter, MBE, MC, Chairman of the Australian Wool Bureau, and of the Australian Woolgrowers' Council.
- Samuel Fogo Cochran, Chairman of the Joint Coal Board, New South Wales. For services to the coal industry in Australia.
- Arthur Roden Cutler, VC, lately Her Majesty's Australian Envoy Extraordinary and Minister Plenipotentiary to the Republic of Egypt.
- Asdruebal James Keast, MM, a Member of the Immigration Planning Council, Commonwealth of Australia.
- James Malcolm Newman, Commonwealth Controller of Minerals Production.
- Ernest Biggs Richardson, Deputy Governor, Commonwealth Bank, and Deputy Chairman, Commonwealth Bank Board.

==== Officer of the Order of the British Empire (OBE) ====
Military Division

- Commander Vincent Edward Kennedy, Royal Australian Navy.
- Lieutenant-Colonel Arthur William de Courcy-Browne (2/40091), Australian Staff Corps.
- Lieutenant-Colonel Frank Cox, ED, (1/19701), Royal Australian Infantry Corps.
- Lieutenant-Colonel Kenneth Murdoch MacKenzie (2/105), Australian Staff Corps.
- Group Captain Joseph Patrick Godsell, Royal Australian Air Force.
- Group Captain William Edwin Townsend, Royal Australian Air Force.

Civil Division

- Edward John Connellan, Governing Director, Connellan Airways. For services to civil aviation in Northern and Central Australia.
- Joseph Griffith, JP, Administrator of the Royal Perth Hospital, Western Australia, and a Vice-President of the West Australian Branch of the Australian Institute of Hospital Administrators.
- Henry John Chadwick Hanrahan, MB, BS, a medical practitioner, of Albany, Western Australia. For services to the community.
- Donald James Hibberd, First Assistant Secretary, Department of the Treasury, Commonwealth of Australia.
- Edith Hughes-Jones, Chairman of the College of Nursing in Australia.
- John Lawrence Knott, Deputy Secretary, Department of Defence Production, Commonwealth of Australia.
- Ethel Stewart Lochhead, Matron, Wooroloo Sanatorium, Western Australia. For services to the Nursing profession in Australia.
- Francis Jeremiah Marcusson, First Assistant Comptroller-General, Department of Customs and Excise, Commonwealth of Australia.
- Neil Alexander McArthur, ED, Federal Secretary, Constitutional League of Australia.
- Alexander Washington McGibbony, in recognition of his honorary service to the Commonwealth Department of Health on behalf of the profession of pharmacy.
- Bert Meecham, of Peppermint Grove, Western Australia. For services to commerce and industry in Australia.
- Arthur Leonard Nutt, First Assistant Secretary, Department of Immigration, Commonwealth of Australia.
- Francis Noble Ratcliffe, Officer-in-Charge, Wild Life Survey Section, Council for Scientific and Industrial Research Organisation, Commonwealth of Australia.
- Kennedy Blexfield Ready, Commonwealth Press Relations Officer for the Duke of Edinburgh's visit to Australia.
- George Simpson, MB, BS, of Ivanhoe, Victoria. For services to the Flying Doctor Service of Australia.
- John Keith Waller, Assistant Secretary, Department of External Affairs, Commonwealth of Australia.
- James Robert Willoughby, Federal Director, Liberal Party of Australia.
- Harold Royce Wilmot, Commissioner of Patents, Attorney-General's Department, Commonwealth of Australia.
- Latham Withall, Director, Associated Chambers of Manufactures of Australia, Canberra.

==== Member of the Order of the British Empire (MBE) ====
Military Division

- Lieutenant-Commander (S.D.) Charles Hilton Nicholls, Royal Australian Navy.
- Electrical Sub-Lieutenant Alfred Edward Warwick, Royal Australian Naval Reserve.
- Captain (temporary) Robert James Harvey (4/39028), Royal Australian Infantry Corps.
- Major (Quartermaster) Arthur Bruce Hirst (3/147), Royal Australian Army Service Corps.
- 2/45842 Warrant Officer Class I John Keith Innes, Royal Australian Armoured Corps.
- Major Reginald John McDermott (3/108672), Royal Australian Armoured Corps.
- 3/45464 Warrant Officer Class I Edwin William Prosser, Royal Australian Corps of Electrical and Mechanical Engineers.
- 2/697 Warrant Officer Class I Colin Charles Smith, Royal Australian Engineers.
- Captain (temporary) Robert Morrison Burgess Strawbridge, (2/115666), Royal Australian Engineers.
- Squadron Leader William Charles Hendy (03279), Royal Australian Air Force.
- Warrant Officer Ronald Drew Cook (A.31465), Royal Australian Air Force.
- Warrant Officer William Douglas Munro (A.31234), Royal Australian Air Force.

Civil Division

- Jack Neville Andrews, Director of Finance (Treasury), Department of Air, Commonwealth of Australia.
- Henry Conrad Becker, Superintendent, Commonwealth Aircraft Corporation. For services to the aircraft industry in Australia.
- Charles Ivens Buffett, of Norfolk Island. For services to the community.
- Lieutenant-Commander Hartley Stuart-Codde, Royal Australian Naval Volunteer Reserve (Retd.), of Rose Bay, New South Wales. For public services.
- Hurtle Josiah Harold Collins, Command Secretary, Headquarters, Central Command, Department of the Army, Commonwealth of Australia.
- Leo George Harley Cunningham, formerly an Administrative Officer in New South Wales of the Department of Commerce and Agriculture, Commonwealth of Australia.
- Alexander John Stratton Day, lately Australian Government Trade Commissioner at Johannesburg.
- Shirley Barbara de la Hunty (née Strickland), Perth, Western Australia; in recognition of her outstanding representation of Australia in the sporting field.
- Vernon Reginald Driscoll, formerly Senior Audit Inspector, Commonwealth Auditor-General's Department, Hobart.
- Peter Drummond, of Wooloowin, Queensland. For services on behalf of limbless soldiers.
- Agnes Ellen Dwyer, formerly Matron, Repatriation General Hospital, Concord, New South Wales.
- Viola Everett, formerly Matron, Repatriation Sanatorium, Kenmore, Queensland.
- Henry Greig, of Mount Lawley, Western Australia. For services to the Australian Red Cross Society.
- Captain Ernest Jason Hassard, a commercial pilot, Australian National Airways
- Stanley Samuel Jones, Acting Aeronautical Engineer, Department of Air, Commonwealth of Australia.
- Eustace Graham Keogh, General Staff Officer 1 (Training), Directorate of Military Training, Army Headquarters, Commonwealth of Australia.
- Harold Maxwell Loveday, an Officer of the Department of External Affairs, Commonwealth of Australia.
- Donald Macpherson, of East St. Kilda, Victoria. For services to Pipe Bands in Australia.
- Joseph Benjamin Mills, Chairman of the Australian Apple and Pear Board.
- Edward Murphy, Senior Procurement Officer, Office of the High Commissioner for the Commonwealth of Australia in London.
- The Reverend Kingsley Foster Partridge, formerly a patrol padre of the Australian Inland Mission of the Presbyterian Church of Australia.
- Herbert William Pickett, MC, ED, Acting Assistant, Director (Engineering), Design and Inspection Branch, Department of Supply, Commonwealth of Australia.
- Arnold Albert Charles Ramm, State Controller, Commonwealth Department of Supply, Perth, Western Australia.
- Claudius Sanderson, of South Yarra, Victoria; in recognition of his services on behalf of returned servicemen.
- Andrew Lyell Scott, of North Sydney, New South Wales; in recognition of his services on behalf of returned servicemen.
- Richard Montgomery Simes, Chairman of the Board of Management, Australian Dried Fruits Association.
- Peter William Thomson, of Warrnambool, Victoria; in recognition of his services to Australia in the sporting and international sphere.
- John William Wilks, of Wagga Wagga, New South Wales. For services to the community.
- Mervyn Thomas Wood, of Randwick, New South Wales; in recognition of his outstanding representation in the sphere of Australian amateur sport.

=== British Empire Medal (BEM) ===
Military Division

- Chief Shore Wireless Operator Charles Cross, R 17679, Royal Australian Navy.
- Chief Petty Officer Steward Charles Henry Horder, R 19598, Royal Australian Navy.
- 2/8371 Corporal (temporary Sergeant) Desmond Cranes, Royal Australian Corps of Signals.
- 2/536 Sergeant Leonard Elwell, Royal Australian Infantry Corps.
- 6/650 Corporal Ivan William Foster, Royal Australian Army Service Corps.
- 3/4375 Sergeant (temporary) Donald Sovereign Gibson, Royal Australian Engineers.
- 2/10621 Sergeant (temporary Warrant Officer Class II) John Thomas Lloyd, Royal Australian Artillery.
- 3/110033 Sergeant Francis Albert Luckman, Royal Australian Armoured Corps.
- 2/57513 Warrant Officer Class II (temporary) Patrick James O'Toole, Royal Australian Infantry Corps.
- A.2274 Flight Sergeant Jeffrey Meredith Brown, Royal Australian Air Force.
- A.21209 Sergeant Phillip John Weis, Royal Australian Air Force.
- A.2340 Flight Sergeant Harley Raymond Brooks, Royal Australian Air Force (in recognition of services in Japan).

=== Royal Red Cross (RRC) ===
==== Associate of the Royal Red Cross (ARRC) ====
- Major Jean Catherine Dickson (F1/1003), Royal Australian Army Nursing Corps.
