= Deaths in March 1980 =

The following is a list of notable deaths in March 1980.

Entries for each day are listed alphabetically by surname. A typical entry lists information in the following sequence:

- Name, age, country of citizenship at birth, subsequent country of citizenship (if applicable), reason for notability, cause of death (if known), and reference.

== March 1980 ==
=== 1 ===
- Emmett Ashford, 65, American baseball umpire, heart attack.
- André Camel, 75, French rugby player.
- Wilhelmina Cooper, 40, Dutch-American model and modeling agent (Wilhelmina Models), lung cancer.
- Dixie Dean, 73, English footballer, heart attack.
- Dick Dillin, 51, American comic book artist, heart attack.
- Lucien Emerson, 89, American college sports coach.
- Arndt Jorgens, 74, Norwegian-born American baseball player.
- Daniil Khrabrovitsky, 56, Soviet filmmaker.
- Walter C. Klein, 75, American Episcopal prelate, cancer.
- John Jacob Niles, 87, American ballad composer and singer.
- Eric Oliver, 68, English racing cyclist.
- Henry Owl, 84, American historian and Native American activist.
- Dorothy Phillips, 90, American actress, pneumonia.
- William W. Stickney, 80, American general, heart failure.
- Anna Ticho, 85, Czech-born Israeli artist.
- Johnny Watwood, 74, American baseball player.

=== 2 ===
- Pierre Capdeville, 71–72, French entomologist.
- Ugo Capocchini, 79, Italian artist.
- Anne Cornwall, 83, American actress and singer, heart failure.
- Eddie Dunn, 64, American football and baseball coach.
- Jarosław Iwaszkiewicz, 86, Polish poet and essayist.
- Joshua Kunitz, 83, Russian-American journalist and literary scholar.
- Arlie Schardt, 84, American Olympic runner (1920).
- Wilhelm Weber, 61, German Nazi official.
- Winfield Welch, 80, American baseball player and manager.

=== 3 ===
- Roger Davis, 96, American actor, cancer.
- Forrest C. Donnell, 95, American politician, member of the U.S. Senate (1945–1951), governor of Missouri (1941–1945).
- Sir Michael Duff, 3rd Baronet, 72, British socialite and hereditary peer.
- Royes Fernandez, 50, American ballet dancer, cancer.
- Manuel Garriga, 54, Algerian-born French footballer, blunt force trauma.
- Roger Hawkins, 64, Rhodesian politician.
- Wade Marlette, 80, American college sports coach.
- Roy Norman, 83, Australian Olympic sprinter (1924).
- Jerry Priddy, 60, American baseball player, heart attack.
- Avraham Rakanti, 91–92, Greek-Israeli politician, MK (1949–1951).
- Tayfur Sökmen, 87–88, Turkish politician, president of Hatay (1938–1939).

=== 4 ===
- Vakhtang Ananyan, 74, Soviet Armenian writer and journalist.
- Johannes Martin Bijvoet, 88, Dutch chemist and crystallographer.
- Colin Bishop, 76, English rugby player.
- Eric Kerfoot, 55, English footballer.
- J. F. A. McManus, 68, Canadian pathologist.
- Luis Piazzini, 74, Argentine chess player.
- Alfred Plé, 92, French Olympic rower (1920).
- Baptist Reinmann, 76, German footballer.
- David Howard Saunders, 89, American politician, member of the Florida House of Representatives (1945–1951).
- Alva Sibbetts, 79, Canadian ice hockey player.
- Alex Vetchinsky, 77, British art director and production designer.

=== 5 ===
- Amy Douglass, 77, American actress.
- Les Fleming, 64, American baseball player.
- Jack Gallagher, 60, English historian, heart and kidney failure.
- Wilhelm Hoegner, 92, German politician.
- Marc Edmund Jones, 91, American writer and astrologer.
- Ujitoshi Konomi, 67, Japanese Olympic sports shooter (1956).
- Michael Parker, 79, British Anglican prelate.
- William L. Patterson, 88, American political activist.
- John Raven, 65, English classical scholar.
- Abdullah Rimawi, 59–60, Jordanian politician.
- Stig Reuterswärd, 73, Swedish Olympic runner (1924).
- Sir Alfred Savage, 76, British colonial administrator.
- Jay Silverheels, 67, Canadian-American actor (The Lone Ranger), stroke.
- John Skeaping, 78, English sculptor.
- Winifred Wagner, 82, English-born German opera manager.
- Sir Douglas Waring, 75, British businessman.
- Albert Züblin, 74, Swiss soldier and lawyer.

=== 6 ===
- Hikmet Bayur, 88–89, Turkish politician.
- Harry Becker, 87, British politician, MP (1922–1924).
- Otto Busse, 78, German World War II resistance member and humanitarian.
- Noel Croucher, 88, British businessman and philanthropist.
- Willem de Vries Lentsch, 93, Dutch Olympic sailor (1928, 1936).
- James Dickson, 80, Swedish politician.
- Bobby Jones, 51, American jazz saxophonist, emphysema.
- Jim Moodie, 74, Australian footballer.
- Norman Preston, 76, English sports journalist.
- James C. Shannon, 83, American politician, governor (1948–1949) and lieutenant governor of Connecticut (1947–1948).
- E. A. Underwood, 80, Scottish physician and public health official.
- Robert Wilson, 57, English cricketer.

=== 7 ===
- Gladys Calthrop, 85, British stage designer.
- Sara Christian, 61, American racing driver.
- John Illingworth, 76, English yacht designer.
- August Kasvand, 89, Soviet Estonian mathematician.
- Marcel Mazeyrat, 73, French racing cyclist.
- Eugene Condell Leonard Parkinson, 74, Jamaican politician.
- Jack Sack, 78, American football player and coach.
- Rudolf Schmidt, 85, Austrian sculptor.
- Vaughn Waddell, 69, Canadian-born American basketball player.
- John Watson, 69, English cricketer.

=== 8 ===
- Caroline Lexow Babcock, 98, American suffragist and activist.
- Graham Dadds, 68, British Olympic field hockey player (1952).
- Fernand Gillet, 97, French-American oboist.
- Ben T. Gunter Jr., 77, American politician, member of the Virginia Senate (1944–1952).
- Eileen Guppy, 76, British geologist.
- Friedrich Hecht, 76, Austrian chemist.
- Josef Kroll, 90, German philologist.
- Frank McDonald, 80, American film and television director.
- Max Miedinger, 69, Swiss typeface designer (Helvetica).
- J. Irving Whalley, 77, American politician, member of the U.S. House of Representatives (1960–1973), heart attack.

=== 9 ===
- Tom Baker, 45, American baseball player.
- Nikolay Bogolyubov, 80, Soviet actor.
- Olga Chekhova, 82, Russian-German actress.
- Noël Dorion, 75, Canadian politician, MP (1958–1962).
- Don Floyd, 41, American football player, heart attack.
- Heinz Linge, 66, German Nazi official, valet for Adolf Hitler, heart failure.
- Giuseppe Mojoli, 74, Italian Roman Catholic prelate.
- Shinzō Ōya, 85, Japanese politician.

=== 10 ===
- José Américo de Almeida, 93, Brazilian politician.
- Emeel S. Betros, 48, American politician and lawyer, lung cancer.
- Frank Callaghan, 88, New Zealand agriculturalist.
- Melville Henry Cane, 100, American poet and lawyer.
- Werner Coninx, 68, Swiss artist and art collector.
- Euan Dickson, 87, British-born New Zealand flying ace.
- Lutz Gerresheim, 21, German footballer.
- Subodh Ghosh, 70, Indian author.
- Sheldon Glueck, 83, Polish-born American criminologist.
- Alexander S. Gross, 63, American rabbi.
- James M. Hare, 69, American politician, Michigan secretary of state (1955–1970).
- Francis Kelly, 86, Australian politician.
- William Kroll, 79, American violinist and composer.
- Walter Lock, 72, English cricketer.
- Adrien Pouliot, 84, Canadian mathematician.
- Herman Tarnower, 69, American cardiologist, shot.
- Zhang Fakui, 83, Chinese general.

=== 11 ===
- Simone Chapoteau, 77, Haitian-born French athlete.
- Julio de Caro, 80, Argentine composer and bandleader.
- Jack Evans, 74, American football player.
- Chandra Bhanu Gupta, 77, Indian politician.
- Yūnosuke Itō, 60, Japanese actor.
- Mikhail Kaufman, 82–83, Soviet cinematographer.
- Stan Klopp, 69, American baseball player.
- Maud Hart Lovelace, 87, American author.
- Saad Nadim, 60, Egyptian documentarian.
- Phillip Rahoi, 83, American politician, member of the Michigan Senate (1955–1966).
- Koshiro Ueki, 80, Japanese politician.

=== 12 ===
- Jay Anson, 58, American author (The Amityville Horror), complications from heart surgery.
- Gerritdina Benders-Letteboer, 70, Dutch humanitarian and World War II resistance member.
- Renée Brock, 67, Belgian writer, heart attack.
- Ernő Gerő, 81, Hungarian politician, heart attack.
- Latif Imanov, 57, Soviet Azerbaijani physicist.
- Gustav Laabs, 77, German Nazi official and war criminal.
- Renée Lamberet, 78, French historian and anarchist activist.
- Eugeniu Ștefănescu-Est, 98, Romanian poet and lawyer.
- Sir Roland Theodore Symonette, 81, Bahamian politician, premier (1964–1967).

=== 13 ===
- René Bernatchez, 66, Canadian politician.
- Burton Howard Camp, 99, American mathematician.
- Jean Davey, 70, Canadian physician.
- Norman DePoe, 62, American-born Canadian news broadcaster.
- E. Urner Goodman, 88, American scouting leader, pneumonia.
- Sir William Mallalieu, 71, British politician, MP (1945–1979).
- Paul Molyneux, 74, English cricketer.
- Lillian Ngoyi, 68, South African anti-Apartheid activist and politician.
- Tauno Pylkkänen, 61, Finnish composer.
- Frank Spilling, 67, Australian footballer.
- Harlan Warde, 62, American actor.
- Alonzo L. Waters, 86, American politician, member of the New York State Assembly (1949–1965).

=== 14 ===
- Corrado Ardizzoni, 64, Italian Olympic racing cyclist (1936).
- Henri Bellivier, 89, French Olympic racing cyclist (1920).
- Henk Blomvliet, 69, Dutch footballer.
- Win Brockmeyer, 72, American football coach.
- Manlio Brosio, 82, Italian politician and diplomat, secretary general of NATO (1964–1971).
- Bob Davis, 65, American football player.
- Robert Dennison, 78, American naval admiral, pulmonary embolism.
- Ray Ednie, 52, Australian footballer.
- Mohammad Hatta, 77, Indonesian politician, prime minister (1948–1950) and vice president (1945–1956).
- Gustavus Kelly, 78, Irish cricketer.
- Allard K. Lowenstein, 51, American politician, member of the U.S. House of Representatives (1969–1971), shot.
- Gerhard W. Menzel, 58, German writer.
- Eddie Mosscrop, 87, English footballer.
- Dudley Maurice Newitt, 85, British chemical engineer.
- Eric Orr, 70, Australian footballer.
- Peter Renzulli, 84, American soccer player.
- Félix Rodríguez de la Fuente, 52, Spanish naturalist and broadcaster, plane crash.
- David Sheehama, 46, Namibian businessman and philanthropist, shot.
- Gladys Guggenheim Straus, 84, American nutritionist.
- Vere Temple, 82, British artist.
- Al Wickland, 92, American baseball player.
- Notable victims of the LOT Polish Airlines Flight 007 crash:
  - Anna Jantar, 29, Polish singer
  - Alan P. Merriam, 56, American ethnomusicologist
  - Lemuel Steeples, 23, American boxer

=== 15 ===
- Gerald Abrahams, 72, English chess player and barrister.
- Roland Armontel, 78, French actor.
- Charles Austin, 87, American rugby player and coach.
- Octávio Brandão, 83, Brazilian politician.
- Daisy Earles, 72, German-born American entertainer (The Doll Family) and actress (Freaks, The Wizard of Oz).
- Marta Ehrlich, 69, Croatian painter.
- Frank Foulkes, 80, British trade unionist.
- Abram Grushko, 61, Soviet painter.
- Sir Cyril Harrison, 78, British businessman.
- Léon Jomaux, 58, Belgian racing cyclist.
- Émile Pladner, 73, French boxer.
- Sir Chandulal Madhavlal Trivedi, 86, Indian politician and civil servant.
- Les Witherspoon, 53, American baseball player.

=== 16 ===
- Neville D'Souza, 47, Indian footballer, stroke.
- Leroy Goldsworthy, 73, American-born Canadian ice hockey player.
- Kimura Susumu, 88, Japanese naval admiral.
- Charles William Morrow, 82, Canadian politician.
- Alfred Reul, 70, Polish Olympic cyclist (1928).

=== 17 ===
- Alex W. Bealer, 59, American craftsman and historian.
- George Boas, 88, American philosopher.
- Boun Oum, 68, Laotian politician and royal, prime minister (1948–1950, 1960–1962).
- Rose Conway, 79–80, American political aide.
- Farciot Edouart, 85, American special effects artist.
- Rudolf Escher, 68, Dutch composer and music theorist.
- Cyril Hamnett, Baron Hamnett, 73, British politician and journalist.
- Bob Hooper, 57, Canadian-born American baseball player, heart attack.
- P. M. Hubbard, 69, British writer.
- Al Jochim, 77, German-born American Olympic gymnast (1932).
- Jan Krásl, 80, Czech Olympic ice hockey player (1924, 1928).
- Mary Alice McWhinnie, 57, American biologist, brain cancer.
- Rafael Paasio, 76, Finnish politician, prime minister (1966–1968, 1972).
- William Prager, 76, German-born American mathematician.
- John M. Slack Jr., 64, American politician, member of the U.S. House of Representatives (since 1959), heart attack.
- Hans Nikolai Stavrand, 86, Norwegian politician.
- Bice Valori, 52, Italian actress and comedian, cancer.

=== 18 ===
- Jerzy Bułanow, 75, Russian-born Polish footballer.
- Orval R. Cook, 81, American general, heart attack.
- Jessica Dragonette, 80, American singer, heart attack.
- Erich Fromm, 79, German-American psychoanalyst.
- Elsa Goveia, 54, Guyanese historian.
- Herman Griffith, 86, Trinidadian cricketer.
- Sir Ludwig Guttmann, 80, German-British neurologist and disability activist.
- Evelyn Hodges, 92, Irish Anglican prelate.
- George Clayton Kennedy, 60, American botanist, cancer.
- Tamara de Lempicka, 85, Polish painter.
- Louise Lovely, 85, Australian actress.
- Norm Robinson, 79, Australian rugby player and coach.
- Luis Saura, 89, Spanish footballer.
- John Timms, 73, English cricketer.
- Grigor Vachkov, 47, Bulgarian actor.

=== 19 ===
- Ivan Bolshakov, 77, Soviet bureaucrat.
- Millen Brand, 74, American writer and poet.
- Neva "Aunt Sap" Brasfield, 91, American comedian.
- Greta Carlsson, 81, Swedish Olympic swimmer (1912).
- Arvid Emanuelsson, 66, Swedish footballer.
- Nilo Franzen, 77, Brazilian Olympic rower (1936).
- Frederick Atwood Greeley, 83, American astronomer.
- Francisco Jerman, 59, Slovenian-Argentine Olympic skier (1960).
- Børge Minerth, 59, Danish Olympic gymnast (1948, 1952).
- Reginald Smith-Rose, 85, English physicist.
- Bedrettin Tuncel, 69–70, Turkish politician and educator.
- Constantin Vasiliu-Rășcanu, 92, Romanian general and politician.
- Jack Walsh, 62, Australian rugby player.
- Charles Wood, 2nd Earl of Halifax, 67, British politician and hereditary peer, MP (1937–1945).
- Ernest Yates, 65, British Olympic figure skater (1936).

=== 20 ===
- Alun Davies, 63–64, Welsh historian, cancer.
- Floyd Draper, 86, American jurist.
- Barbara Massalska, 53, Polish artist.
- Ernst Schiffner, 76, German actor and director.
- Marcel Tremblay, 64, Canadian ice hockey player.
- Angela Trindade, 70, Indian-American painter.

=== 21 ===
- M. Mariappa Bhat, 73, Indian linguist and lexicographer.
- Marcel Boussac, 90, French businessman and Thoroughbred racehorse breeder.
- Barbara Brooke, 54, New Zealand art dealer.
- Angelo Bruno, 69, Italian-born American mobster (Philadelphia crime family), shot.
- Hans Dichgans, 72, German politician.
- Luís Espinal Camps, 48, Spanish journalist, shot.
- George Hyde Fallon, 77, American politician, member of the U.S. House of Representatives (1945–1971).
- Sam Ferris, 79, British Olympic runner (1932).
- Russell G. Lloyd Sr., 47, American politician, shot.
- Ian Murray Mackerras, 81, Australian zoologist.
- Edward F. McNulty, 74, American politician.
- Herm Schaefer, 61, American basketball player and coach.
- Peter Stoner, 91, American writer and academic administrator.
- Joseph Stuart, 75, Irish sports administrator.
- Astolfo Tapia, 68, Chilean politician.
- Ralph Ulveling, 77, American librarian.
- Livia Veloz, 87, Dominican writer and feminist activist.

=== 22 ===
- Raymond Thayer Birge, 93, American physicist.
- Ray Foley, 73, American baseball player.
- Maurice Gillis, 82, Belgian footballer.
- Georges Groussard, 88, French soldier and World War II resistance member.
- Gerald W. Johnson, 89, American writer and journalist, pneumonia.
- Sir Harold Kinahan, 86, British naval admiral.
- Ed Lynch, 50, American Olympic cyclist (1948).
- Erich Nelson, 82, German botanist and artist.
- Hélio Oiticica, 42, Brazilian artist and filmmaker, stroke.
- Evelyn Procter, 82, British historian and academic administrator.

=== 23 ===
- S. W. Alexander, 84, British journalist and political activist.
- Tom Djäwa, 74–75, Australian artist.
- Lou Knerr, 58, American baseball player.
- Isabel Rockefeller Lincoln, 77, American socialite.
- Alekos Livaditis, 65–66, Greek actor.
- Grace Lumpkin, 89, American novelist (To Make My Bread).
- Sir Henry McCall, 84, British naval admiral.
- Jacob Miller, 27, Jamaican reggae musician (Inner Circle), traffic collision.
- Arthur Melvin Okun, 51, American economist, heart attack.
- Charles Pannell, 77, British politician, MP (1949–1974).
- Eugene Allison Smith, 57, American politician, member of the Minnesota House of Representatives (1971–1973), heart attack.
- Henning Throne-Holst, 84, Norwegian-born Swedish businessman.
- Joan Whittington, 73, English nurse.

=== 24 ===
- John Barrie, 62, English actor (Sergeant Cork, Z-Cars).
- Reginald Bell, 78, Canadian politician and jurist.
- Eric Bensted, 79, Australian cricketer.
- Piatrus Brouka, 74, Soviet Belarusian poet.
- Beanie Ebert, 77, American football player and coach.
- Pierre Etchebaster, 86, French real tennis player.
- Ernst John von Freyend, 70, German Nazi official.
- Sid Goodwin, 65, Australian rugby player.
- Robert Martin, 88, American cinematographer.
- François Person, 57, French racing cyclist.
- Óscar Romero, 62, Salvadoran Roman Catholic prelate, shot.
- Donald Slade, 91, English footballer.
- Elisabeth Wendt, 74, German actress.

=== 25 ===
- Milton H. Erickson, 78, American psychiatrist and psychologist.
- Émile Gardetto, 72, Monegasque Olympic rower (1928).
- Phyllis Hynes, 83, English-born New Zealand botanist.
- Erminio Macario, 77, Italian actor and comedian.
- Edna McGriff, 44, American R&B musician, lymphoma.
- Henry Orth, 82, American football player.
- Enid Riddell, 77, British racing driver and socialite.
- Holger Schön, 69, Swedish Olympic skier (1932).
- Walter Susskind, 66, Czech-born British pianist and conductor.
- James Wright, 52, American poet, tongue cancer.

=== 26 ===
- Roland Barthes, 64, French literary theorist, injuries sustained from a traffic collision.
- John Edward Blair, 80, American bacteriologist.
- Les Boyne, 80, Australian footballer.
- Basil Coad, 73, British general.
- Richard W. Farrell, 69, American film editor.
- Dragutin Friedrich, 83, Croatian footballer.
- Mike Katrishen, 57, American football player.
- Zofia Lissa, 71, Polish musicologist.
- H. G. Merriam, 96, American literary critic.
- John Poulos, 32, American drummer (The Buckinghams), heart failure.

=== 27 ===
- Philip W. Anderson, 64, American film editor.
- Jorge Aspée, 78, Chilean politician.
- Steve Fisher, 67, American author and screenwriter.
- Gus Haenschen, 90, American pianist and composer.
- G. Maurice Hann, 94, British trade unionist.
- Franz J. Ingelfinger, 69, German-born American physician and journalist, esophageal cancer.
- Idris Jamma', 58, Sudanese poet.
- Warren Marrison, 83, Canadian engineer and inventor (quartz clock).
- Humberto Monteiro, 32, Brazilian footballer.
- Roger Spong, 73, English rugby player.
- William Thomas Straith, 85, Canadian politician and lawyer.
- Wang Dazhi, 76, Chinese educator.

=== 28 ===
- William Stafford Anderson, 96, Canadian politician.
- Sir Fenton Atkinson, 74, British jurist (Moors murders trial).
- Flavia Blois, 65, British painter.
- Helena Bochořáková-Dittrichová, 85, Czech painter and graphic novelist.
- Jack Dunstone, 78, Australian footballer.
- James Hayes, 91, American-Filipino Roman Catholic prelate.
- Dick Haymes, 61, Argentine-American singer and actor, lung cancer.
- George Owen Johnson, 84, Canadian air marshal and flying ace.
- Branko Pleše, 65, Croatian footballer.
- Kristian Vilhelm Koren Schjelderup Jr., 86, Norwegian theologian.

=== 29 ===
- William Gemmell Cochran, 70, Scottish-born American statistician.
- Peter De Greef, 57, British actor.
- Harold David London, 73, New Zealand public servant and historian.
- Vicente López Carril, 37, Spanish racing cyclist, heart attack.
- Einar Nilsen, 78, Norwegian Olympic boxer (1920).
- Alfred Rodenbücher, 79, German Nazi official.
- Kilby Snow, 74, American folk musician.
- Leslie Francis Stokes Upton, 48, English-Canadian historian, cancer.
- George W. Watt, 69, American chemist.

=== 30 ===
- Francis Douglas, 1st Baron Douglas of Barloch, 90, British politician and journalist, MP (1940–1946).
- Ferdinand Friebe, 86, Australian Olympic runner (1924).
- Cornelis Jacobus Gorter, 72, Dutch physicist.
- Jim Hammond, 72, British trade unionist.
- Lauri Härö, 80, Finnish Olympic runner (1924).
- Mantovani, 74, Italian-born British composer and conductor.
- Henry Poulaille, 83, French writer.
- David Sharpe, 70, American actor and stunt performer, amyotrophic lateral sclerosis.
- Joseph Tarka, 47, Nigerian politician.
- Tôn Đức Thắng, 91, Vietnamese politician, president (since 1969), cardiopulmonary arrest.

=== 31 ===
- Frank Courtnay, 76, Australian politician, MP (1958–1969).
- Vladimír Holan, 74, Czech poet.
- Otto Husted, 77, Danish Olympic field hockey player (1928).
- Alexander Hamilton McDonald, 61, Canadian politician.
- John Nightingale, 37, British actor, cancer.
- Jesse Owens, 66, American Olympic track and field athlete (1936), four-time gold medalist, lung cancer.
