= Züblin family =

Swiss patrician family from Saint-Gallen

Züblin
- Place of origin: Toggenburg, Saint-Gallen
- Founded: 16th century
- Members: Jacob Züblin, Paulus Züblin, Eduard Züblin
- Distinctions: Two burgomasters of Saint-Gallen
- Traditions: Textile manufacturing, trade
- Cadet branches: Dutch branch (Zubli), American branch (Zubly/Sibley), Argentine branch

The Züblin (also spelled Zubli, Zubly, Sibley, and other variants) are a patrician family originally from St. Gallen, Switzerland. They rose to prominence in the city's governing class through the textile trade and produced two burgmasters. From the 18th century onward, branches of the family spread into four colonial regions: the Caribbean, British North America and the United States, the Dutch East Indies, and West Africa.

== Origins and rise in St-Gallen ==
In the 16th and 17th centuries, the Züblin were dispersed throughout the Obertoggenburg and the Necker valley. In 1545, Felix Züblin, originally from Degersheim, settled in St. Gallen and acquired citizenship there. Reformed in confession and active in textile manufacturing, the family belonged to the Weavers' guild until 1798 and rapidly rose to the Saint-Gallen ruling class. It produced two burgomasters: Jacob Züblin and Paulus Züblin (1736–1809).

== Dutch branch and Berbice ==
Paulus Züblin (1709–1760), sole grandson of Burgomaster Jacob Züblin, emigrated via the Netherlands to the Dutch colony of Berbice (present-day Guyana), where he was a planter (see slavery) and justice councillor, founding the Dutch branch of the Züblin. His widow, Cornelia Gertrud Versteer (1733–1800), married two years after his death the Dutch justice councillor Adriaan Gillissen (1716–1763), who thereby became owner of the plantation Zublis Lust. Like many other plantations owned by Swiss, this estate was caught up in the 1763 great slave revolt of Berbice. Ambrosius Züblin (1725–1763), brother of Paulus (1709–1760) and director of the plantations De Prosperiteit, Zion, and Rusthof, was killed by the rebels at the beginning of the uprising. The bells of the parish church of St. Lawrence in Saint-Gallen were rung in his memory at the initiative of his brother-in-law Caspar Tobias Zollikofer von Altenklingen. Adriaan Gillissen also lost his life during the revolt. Once the uprising was suppressed, Cornelia Gertrud Versteer (known as the "widow Subly") founded a new plantation in 1766 on the lower Berbice River, called Schepmoed, where enslaved persons cultivated cotton, coffee, and cacao. She had five children: Magdalena Johanna (1750–1784), Ambrosius Justus (1751–1820), Johanna Louisa (1754–1796), Paulus (1756–1790), and Abraham Züblin (1760–after 1811). Of these, Paulus Züblin took over management of the plantation after his mother's return to Holland. He introduced the Schaffhousois Johann Conrad Winz to its administration (c. 1785), then died in 1790 during a sea voyage to Amsterdam. Cornelia Gertrud Versteer remained co-owner of Schepmoed until the 1790s.

Magdalena Johanna Züblin married Johann Georg Zollikofer von Altenklingen in 1774 and died in 1784 at Altenklingen Castle in Thurgau. Johanna Louisa and Abraham Züblin were admitted in 1777 to the Dutch parish of Doesburg and confirmed their Saint-Gallen burghership for that purpose. After a period in St. Gallen, Abraham Züblin pursued a military career in the service of Holland in West Africa (Fort Elmina, Ghana) and in South America (Demerara and Berbice), from where he sent his last known news to his family in Holland in 1811. Ambrosius Justus Züblin served as a deputy to the National Assembly of the Batavian Republic and belonged to the Dutch patriciate. Members of the Dutch branch also established connections with the colonies of the Dutch East Indies (Sumatra, Semarang, Batavia, Surabaya), where they served as administrators, military officers, or were active in the sugar industry. Justus Cornelis Zubli (1830–1867), great-grandson of Paulus Züblin (1709–1760), was an officer in the Royal Netherlands East Indies Army (KNIL); Jacobus Emile de Clercq Zubli (1874–1959) was a tax inspector in Batavia (Jakarta); and Christiaan Eliza Zubli (1895–1950) was vice-director of the Commissiebank Holland-Indië. As late as 1908, the formerly St. Gallen plantation Zublis Lust still appeared under that name (Zubble's Lust) in the Official Gazette of British Guiana.

== American branch ==
The American branch of the family, known under the variants Zubly, Zublin, Zubley, and Sibley, was founded by Jacob Züblin's nephew, David Züblin (1700–1753, emigrated 1736), and his descendants. Among them was Hans Joachim Züblin, who had left St. Gallen in 1744 for South Carolina. A planter like many Swiss emigrants, he named a property near Savannah "Saint-Gall." In 1778 he is recorded as the owner of 18 enslaved persons, who may have cultivated indigo. The family amassed considerable wealth. His brother David Zubly (1738–1790) also owned land and enslaved people. David Zubly (1748–1792), son of Hans Joachim Züblin, was born in Purrysburg and owned 34 enslaved persons, including 14 women and 4 children. In 1784 he moved to the Bahamas, where his children Helena (before 1829), John Joachim, and Elizabeth Zubly (1784–1836) were also landowners. The American slave register of 1860 lists numerous slaveholders named Sibley in the Southern states, among them the cotton merchant and railway entrepreneur Josiah Sibley (1809–1888) of Augusta, Georgia.

== Later St. Gallen branches ==
In 1722, the Saint-Gallen branch divided into two lines with Hektor (1687–1743, textile manufacturer) and Christian Züblin (1701–1751), who married the sisters Adriana Dorothea (1707–1765) and Anna Margaretha Zollikofer (1702–1774) respectively.

Hektor Züblin is the ancestor of Georg Joachim Züblin (1749–1815), councillor in Saint-Gallen, member of the city council, and president of the commercial directorate; Georg Emil Züblin (1844–1903), chief engineer of the Swiss Northeastern Railway; Georg Züblin; and Albert Züblin.

The line of Christian Züblin, which specialized in the textile trade with Italy, produced Friedrich Züblin; his brother Julius Züblin (1814–1878), textile manufacturer in Angri and merchant in Bari; and Carl Ambrosius Züblin (1826–1886), professor in Peru and Chile, ancestor of the Argentine branch of the family. Among the descendants of Christian Züblin are also Ludwig Eugen Züblin (1851–1926), co-founder of the Littai spinning mill in Litija, Slovenia; Heinrich Züblin (1860–1935), textile chemist; and Eduard Züblin, civil engineer, who founded the company Ed. Züblin AG in Stuttgart.

== Bibliography ==
=== Archival sources ===
- Gelders Archief, Arnhem, Lidmaat Abraham Zubli (membership list of the parish of Doesburg).
- Kantonsbibliothek Vadiana, Saint-Gallen, Stemmatologia Sangallensis, vols. 27 and 28: Geschlecht-register aller in der statt St. Gallen verburgerter und sich noch im wesen findenden geschlechtern (Züblin).
- Nationaal Archief, The Hague, Nieuw gemeten kaart van de Colonie Berbice met derzelver plantagien en de namen der bezitters, 1740.
- Nationaal Archief, The Hague, Register van vrijbrieven. Met losse bijlage, 1735–1761, pp. 15–17 (licenses for Paulus Züblin).
- Staatsarchiv St. Gallen, Saint-Gallen, Familie Züblin von St. Gallen: Archiv; Christoph Züblin (1807–1862): Genealogie der Züblin, Bürger von St. Gallen («Grünes Buch»); Züblin in Holland: Zubli und de Clercq Zubli.
- Stadsarchief Amsterdam, Amsterdam, Archief van de Familie Zubli.
- Stadtarchiv St. Gallen, Saint-Gallen, Realregister zu den Stadt- und Gemeinderatsprotokollen, vol. V, p. 2.

=== Secondary sources ===
- Mourik, Bernardus: Naam-lyst der bestierders officieren en bediendens &c. op de colonie de Berbice, Wironje, Canje en Wicki, 1767.
- Ottens, Reinier; Ottens, Josua: "Landkaart van de Volkplantingen Suriname en Berbice", in: Salmon, Thomas: Hedendaagsche Historie of Tegenwoordige staat van Amerika, vol. 2, 1767, p. 510.
- Dieth-Locher, Friedrich: Bürgerbuch der Stadt St. Gallen. Abgeschlossen auf 31. Dezember 1886, 1887, p. 362.
- Williams, James: Dutch Plantations on the Banks of the Berbice and Canje Rivers in the Country known since 1831 as the Colony of British Guiana, and the Village evolved from the Plantation, 1940.
- Fässler, Hans: Une Suisse esclavagiste. Voyage dans un pays au-dessus de tout soupçon, 2007 (German original 2005).
- Kars, Marjoleine: Blood on the River. A Chronicle of Mutiny and Freedom on the Wild Coast, 2020, p. 65.
