= George Watts =

George Watts may refer to:

- George Watts (American football) (1918–1990), American football offensive tackle
- George Frederic Watts (1817–1904), English Victorian painter and sculptor
- George Washington Watts (1851–1921), American manufacturer, financier and philanthropist
- George Watts (cricketer) (1867–1949), English cricketer
- George Albert Watts (died 1957), mayor of St Pancras, London
- George Edward Watts (1786–1860), Royal Navy officer
- George Watts Carr (1893–1975), American architect
- George Watts Hill (1901–1993), American banker and philanthropist

== See also ==
- George Watt (disambiguation)
