= Coninx =

Coninx is a surname. Notable people with the surname include:

- Arnout Coninx (1548–1617), printer and bookseller in the city of Antwerp
- Dorian Coninx (born 1994), French triathlete
- Stijn Coninx (born 1957), Belgian film director
- Werner Coninx (1911–1980), Swiss artist and art collector
