= Henry Shanahan =

American athlete and coach (1904–1984)

Biographical details
- Born: October 14, 1904; Auburn, Maine, U.S.
- Died: August 25, 1984 (aged 79); Lewiston, Maine, U.S.

Playing career

Football
- 1925–1929: Holy Cross
- Position: Halfback/Quarterback

Coaching career (HC unless noted)

Football
- 1930–1938: Brooklyn Prep (NY)
- 1939–1944: Lewiston (ME)

Men's basketball
- 1939–1945: Lewiston (ME)
- 1942–1943: Bates

Henry J. "Hyme" Shanahan (October 14, 1904 – August 25, 1984) was an American athlete and coach who played American football at the College of the Holy Cross and coached at Brooklyn Preparatory School, Lewiston High School, and Bates College.

== Athletic career ==
Shanahan was born on October 14, 1904 in Auburn, Maine to Jeremiah and Catherine (Salter) Shanahan. He attended Edward Little High School and was slated to be captain of their 1922 football team, but left the school before the season began. He then enrolled at the Coburn Classical Institute, where he was captain of the football, baseball, and basketball teams.

Shanahan joined the Holy Cross Crusaders football team in 1925. He and two teammates (Blondy Ryan and Clarence "Clary" Ryan) were suspended for the 1926 season. The trio withdrew from the college, but were allowed to return the following year. In 1928, he was moved from halfback to quarterback by head coach Cleo A. O'Donnell.

== Coaching ==
After graduating from Holy Cross in 1930, Shanahan became a teacher and coach at the Brooklyn Preparatory School in Brooklyn. In 1939, he became the head football, basketball, and baseball coach at Lewiston High School in Lewiston, Maine. In his first year as football coach, Lewiston went 9–0 and won the state championship. From 1942 to 1945, his baseball teams won four straight championships. He also coached the Bates College basketball team during the 1942–43 after coach Wade Marlette entered the United States Navy. The Bobcats went 18–1 in his only season as head coach.

== Later life ==
Shanahan left coaching in 1945 to go into business. He was the manager of the sporting goods department of a Lewiston hardware store and later owned and operated a carpet and flooring business. He retired in 1969 and moved to Winter Haven, Florida. In 1984, he returned to Maine for his induction into the Maine Sports Hall of Fame. He died on August 25, 1984 at the Central Maine Medical Center following a long illness.
