= Sibbett =

Sibbett is a surname. Notable people with the surname include:

- Jane Sibbett (born 1962), American actress and comedian
- Wilson Sibbett (born 1948), British physicist

== See also ==
- Alva Sibbetts (1900–1980), Canadian ice hockey player
