= George Watt =

George Watt may refer to:

- George Watt (botanist) (1851–1930), British botanist and academic
- George Watt (public servant) (1890–1983), Australian public servant and company director
- George Watt (rugby league) (1917–2010), Australian rugby league player
- George D. Watt (1812–1881), British religious leader
- George Fiddes Watt (1873–1960), British portrait painter
- George W. Watt (1911–1980), American chemist, participated in the Manhattan Project

== See also ==
- George Harvie-Watt (1903–1989), British Conservative Party politician
- George Watts (disambiguation)
