= Imanov =

Imanov or İmanov (Cyrillic: Иманов) is an Azerbaijani masculine surname, its feminine counterpart is Imanova or İmanova. It may refer to the following notable people:

- Amankeldı İmanov (1873–1919), Kazakh revolutionary
- Aynur Imanova (born 1988), Azerbaijani volleyball player
- Latif Imanov (1922–1980), Azerbaijani physicist
- Lutfiyar Imanov (1928–2008), Azerbaijani opera singer
- Samid Imanov (1981–2016), Azerbaijani military officer
- Yusif İmanov (born 2002), Azerbaijani football goalkeeper
