= Alexander Gross =

Alexander Gross may refer to:

- Alexander Gross (pilot), involved in the Überlingen mid-air collision
- Alexander S. Gross (1917–1980), American Orthodox rabbi
