= Otto Coninx-Girardet =

Publisher (1871–1956)

Otto Coninx-Girardet (June 16, 1871, in Friedrich-Wilhelms-Hütte, Rhine Province – December 1, 1956, in Zurich; domiciled ibid) was a German-Swiss mining engineer and publisher.

== Life ==
Coninx was the son of an ironworks director in the Rhenish-Westphalian industrial area. He studied mining at the Friedrich Schiller University in Jena and at the Bergakademie in Berlin. In 1905 he married Berta Girardet, the daughter of the successful Essen publisher Wilhelm Girardet. The latter sent him to Zurich in 1906 and appointed him publishing director of the Tages-Anzeiger newspaper. His son Otto Coninx-Wettstein was born in 1915. Wilhelm Girardet died in 1918; after his death, Otto Coninx-Girardet took over the company Girardet, Walz & Co. AG, which traded as Tages-Anzeiger für Stadt und Kanton Zürich AG from 1933.

Otto Coninx-Wettstein served on the board of directors from 1942 to 1987. He maintaining control over the Tages-Anzeiger and made acquisitions including the Basler Zeitung, 20 Minuten, the Tribune de Genève, 24Heures and Der Bund.

== Legacy ==
After his death, he was succeeded as managing director by his son Otto Coninx-Wettstein. Another son, Werner Coninx, became an important Swiss art collector. The family is one of the most successful in Switzerland.

== Literature ==
- Coninx, Otto in German, French and Italian in the online Historical Dictionary of Switzerland.
