= Steinerhandel =

1783 revolt in Stein am Rhein

- Part of revolts against authority in the Swiss Confederacy
- Date: September 1783 – 1784
- Location: Stein am Rhein, Canton of Zurich
- Caused by: Authorization of Prussian mercenary recruitment in defiance of Zurich's prohibition
- Methods: Defiance of the sovereign canton; local assertion of autonomy
- Result: Zurich occupies Stein am Rhein; leaders arrested and sentenced

Parties
Zurich	Town council of Stein am Rhein

Lead figures
	Johann Conrad Winz (town bailiff); Johann Conrad Winz (court clerk)

Casualties and losses
	1 died in prison; 1 banished

The Steinerhandel was a 1783 revolt by the inhabitants of Stein am Rhein against their sovereign, the Canton of Zurich. It belongs to the uprisings of subjects against their rulers that were typical of the 18th century in the Old Swiss Confederacy.

== Events ==
In September 1783, the council of Stein am Rhein approved a Prussian recruitment request to enlist mercenaries (Reisläufer) in the town, despite a prohibition issued by its sovereign, Zurich. In the ensuing dispute, Zurich troops occupied Stein am Rhein and captured the two leaders of the resistance: the town Obervogt Johann Conrad Winz and his son of the same name, who held the office of court clerk. The father was sentenced to ten years' imprisonment, which he did not survive, while Johann Conrad Winz the younger was sent into exile. The latter returned in 1800 as a man of means from the Dutch colony of Berbice, settled near the Rhine Falls, and represented his home town in the Schaffhausen cantonal council from 1805 to 1814.

== Bibliography ==
- Pfaff, Robert: "Johann Conrad Winz", in: Schaffhauser Biographien, Part 4, 1981, pp. 379–386 (Schaffhauser Beiträge zur Geschichte, 58).
- Geschichte des Kantons Zürich, vol. 2, 1996, pp. 404–407.
