= Blondy Ryan =

American baseball player (1906–1959)

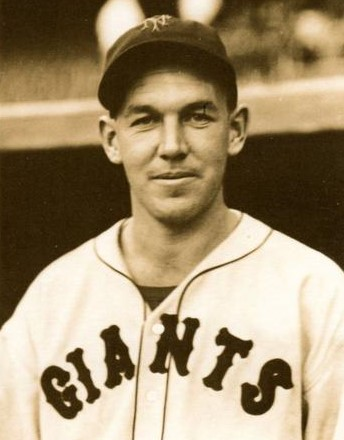
- Shortstop
- Born: January 4, 1906; Lynn, Massachusetts, U.S.
- Died: November 28, 1959 (aged 53); Swampscott, Massachusetts, U.S.
- Batted: Right Threw: Right

MLB debut
- July 13, 1930, for the Chicago White Sox

Last MLB appearance
- July 31, 1938, for the New York Giants

MLB statistics
- Batting average: .239
- Home runs: 8
- Runs batted in: 133
- Stats at Baseball Reference

Teams
- Chicago White Sox (1930); New York Giants (1933–1934); Philadelphia Phillies (1935); New York Yankees (1935); New York Giants (1937–1938)

Career highlights and awards
- World Series champion (1933)

John Collins "Blondy" Ryan (January 4, 1906 – November 28, 1959) was an American shortstop in Major League Baseball who is remembered primarily for his fielding and his starring for the New York Giants' 1933 World Series winners.

== Biography ==
Born in Lynn, Massachusetts, Ryan graduated from Holy Cross in 1930, where he established himself as an outstanding two-sport athlete for the Crusaders. In 1926, as a member of the football team, Ryan tossed two touchdown passes to Hymie Shanahan against Harvard in a 19-14 HC victory.

It was, however, in baseball where Ryan gained the most fame, as he was the star shortstop on Crusader teams that won the Eastern Intercollegiate Championship in 1929 and 1930. The team posted a 45-5-1 record in those years. Ryan was inducted into the Holy Cross Varsity Club Hall of Fame posthumously in 1964. While a student at Holy Cross, Ryan spent the summer of 1928 playing for the Orleans town team in the Cape Cod Baseball League, and returned to the league in 1929 to play for the Osterville team.

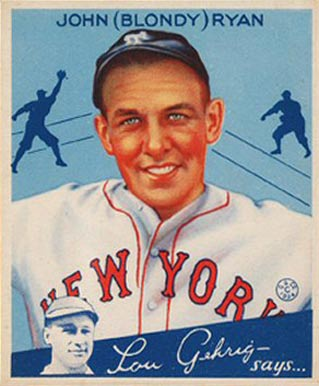
Ryan's 1934 Goudey baseball card

After college graduation, Ryan signed with the Chicago White Sox and hit a home run in his first time at bat at Comiskey Park. In 87 at bats, however, Ryan batted only .207 that year and showed little of the fielding range that later became his hallmark. In 1932, he was traded to the Giants for Doc Marshall. The Giants won the World Series in 1933 and Ryan, batting .238 in 146 games, finished ninth in National League MVP voting.

An AP piece appearing in the New York Herald Journal January 28, 1934, celebrating the signing of Ryan's contract for that year said, "Ryan, only 26 years old and not long out of Holy Cross, was a sensation in his first full year as a major leaguer. He not only plugged the hole at shortstop left by Jackson, but had much to do with instilling a conviction they could win the pennant. Typical of this inspiration was the telegram he sent to (Giants’ manager Bill) Terry, at a time when the team was in a bad slump in the West, Ryan out of the game with a spike wound. The telegram said, ‘They cannot beat us. En route. J.C. Ryan.’"

The next year he was at his best. Ryan's fielding range factor was 0.47 above the league average. He had 125 hits, batting .242 in 110 games. But the Giants traded him in a four-player deal to get All-Star shortstop Dick Bartell. Ryan did not sustain the form he had shown in 1934, however. After a respectable 1935 season in backup roles for the Philadelphia Phillies and New York Yankees, he did not play in 1936 but spent 1937 and 1938 back with the Giants.

After his Major League career ended in 1938, Ryan joined the Navy and served in World War II with Naval Intelligence. He later married and raised a family in Swampscott, Massachusetts, where, in 1959, he died at age 53.
