= Eduard Züblin =

Swiss civil engineer (1850–1916)

- Born: March 11, 1850; Castellammare di Stabia, Campania
- Died: November 25, 1916 (aged 66); Zurich
- Occupations: Civil engineer, construction entrepreneur
- Known for: Reinforced concrete construction
- Spouse: Carolina Bolte (m. 1880)
- Relatives: Friedrich Züblin (uncle)

Eduard Züblin (11 March 1850 – 25 November 1916) was a Swiss civil engineer and construction entrepreneur, known for his work in reinforced concrete construction in Italy and later in Central Europe. His firm Ed. Züblin AG, founded in 1898, grew into one of the major European construction companies of the early 20th century.

== Life and training ==
Züblin was born in Castellammare di Stabia, Campania, the son of Caspar Züblin, a textile merchant, and Ursula Züblin. He was the nephew of Friedrich Züblin. In 1880 he married Carolina Bolte, daughter of Wilhelm Bolte, a railway cashier.

He attended the Institut Ryffel in Stäfa from 1859, then completed an apprenticeship as a mechanical technician at Sulzer in Winterthur from 1867 to 1871. He subsequently worked as a fitter and undertook further training in Lyon and Manchester.

== Career ==
From 1879 to 1882, Züblin worked as an engineer at the Vonwiller & Co. spinning mill in Nocera, Campania. In 1883 he joined the Zurich-born architect Adolf Mauke in Naples, whom he succeeded in 1885. During this period he built numerous industrial buildings and reinforced concrete structures in Campania—among the earliest of their kind.

In 1898, Züblin founded a construction company in Strasbourg, with branches later established in Basel (1908) and Zurich (1912). Drawing on the system developed by the French engineer François Hennebique, he applied innovative solutions in reinforced concrete construction, including bridges, swimming pools, ceilings, sawtooth roofs, silos, and pile foundations. Notable works include the railway viaduct at Langwies (1913–1914) and the underpinning of the foundations of the Strasbourg Cathedral bell tower (from 1914).

At the beginning of the 21st century, the firm Ed. Züblin AG, headquartered in Stuttgart, was one of the leading construction companies in Europe.

== Bibliography ==
=== Archival sources ===
- Family archive (AFam); Cantonal Archives of St. Gallen (StASG)

=== Secondary sources ===
- Revue polytechnique suisse, 68, 1916, no. 25, pp. 291–292
