= Johann Conrad Winz =

Swiss merchant and politician (1757–1828)

- Born: January 18, 1757; Stein am Rhein, Swiss Confederation
- Died: August 26, 1828 (aged 71); Schaffhausen, Switzerland
- Occupations: Merchant, politician
- Spouse: Maria Magdalena von Waldkirch (m. 1802)

Johann Conrad Winz (18 January 1757 – 26 August 1828) was a Swiss merchant and politician. Originally a court clerk, he was exiled to the Dutch colony of Berbice following a political affair, where he became a plantation manager engaged in the coffee and slave trade. He later returned to Switzerland as a wealthy man and held seats in the cantonal councils of Schaffhausen.

== Life ==
Winz was born on 18 January 1757 in Stein am Rhein, the son of Johann Conrad Winz, Stadtvogt, and Maria Barbara Olbrecht, from Lohr am Main (principality of Mainz). In 1802 he married Maria Magdalena von Waldkirch, daughter of Beat Wilhelm von Waldkirch and Maria Magdalena Stokar von Neunforn.

Having served as a court clerk until 1784, Winz was banished to the Dutch colony of Berbice by the Council of Zurich following his involvement in the Steinerhandel. There he became a plantation manager and engaged in the trade of coffee and slaves. The Council authorized his return in 1789, but Winz did not come back to Schaffhausen until 1800, by which time he had become a wealthy man. In 1816 he was admitted to the citizenship of Schaffhausen. He served in the Grand Council of Schaffhausen (1805–1814) and subsequently in the Small Council (1816–1818).

== Bibliography ==
=== Archival sources ===
Zentralbibliothek Zürich, Zurich, Handschriftensammlung, Letters from Johann Conrad Winz (1757–1828) to Johann Heinrich Schinz (1725–1800).

=== Secondary literature ===
Pfaff, Robert (1981). "Johann Conrad Winz". Schaffhauser Biographien. Schaffhauser Beiträge zur Geschichte. 58 (4): 379–386.
