= Johann Georg Zollikofer von Altenklingen =

Swiss jurist and official (1751–1809)

- Born: July 16, 1751; St. Gallen
- Died: November 1, 1809; St. Gallen
- Other name: Johann Georg Zollikofer
- Occupations: Bailiff, judge, politician
- Spouse(s): Magdalena Johanna Züblin (m. 1774); Johanna Katharina Straub (m. 1785)

Johann Georg Zollikofer von Altenklingen (16 July 1751 – 1 November 1809) was a Swiss official and jurist from St. Gallen. He served as Obervogt of Bürglen (TG), member of the Helvetic Supreme Tribunal, and later as an appeal court judge and member of the Grand Council of the newly created canton of St. Gallen.

== Life ==
Johann Georg Zollikofer von Altenklingen was born on 16 July 1751 in St. Gallen, the son of Caspar Tobias Zollikofer von Altenklingen and Sabina Barbara Bion. He married twice: first in 1774 to Magdalena Johanna Züblin, daughter of Paulus Züblin, a plantation owner in Berbice (Guyana) who exploited enslaved people; and second in 1785 to Johanna Katharina Straub, daughter of Georg Straub, a merchant.

From 1781 he served as Obervogt of Bürglen (TG), and after the suppression of this St. Gallen lordship in 1798, he became administrator of its estates. He was a member of the Helvetic Supreme Tribunal from 1798 to 1800 and again from 1802 to 1803. Following the creation of the canton of St. Gallen, he sat as a judge on the court of appeal from 1803 and was elected as a deputy to the Grand Council in 1808. He died on 1 November 1809 in St. Gallen.

== Bibliography ==
=== Archival sources ===
- Staatsarchiv St. Gallen, Saint-Gall, Familie Züblin von St. Gallen.
- Staatsarchiv Thurgau, Frauenfeld, Fideicommiss Zollikofer von Altenklingen, Genealogische Buchführung.

=== Secondary sources ===
Menolfi, Ernest: Bürglen. Geschichte eines thurgauischen Dorfes vom Mittelalter bis zur Gegenwart, 1996.
