= Les Boyne =

Australian rules footballer

Personal information
- Full name: Leslie Thomas Boyne
- Born: 30 August 1899; Carlton, Victoria
- Died: 26 March 1980 (aged 80); Mount Waverley, Victoria

Playing career^{1}
Years	Club	Games (Goals)
1918, 1922	Fitzroy	4 (1)
- ^{1} Playing statistics correct to the end of 1922.

Leslie Thomas Boyne (30 August 1899 – 26 March 1980) was an Australian rules footballer who played with Fitzroy in the Victorian Football League (VFL).
