= Jack Dunstone =

Australian rules footballer, born 1901

Personal information
- Full name: Frederick John Robert Dunstone
- Born: 15 May 1901; Geelong, Victoria
- Died: 28 March 1980 (aged 78); East Geelong, Victoria
- Height: 180 cm (5 ft 11 in)
- Weight: 72 kg (159 lb)

Playing career^{1}
Years	Club	Games (Goals)
1923	Geelong	14 (2)
- ^{1} Playing statistics correct to the end of 1923.

Frederick John Robert Dunstone (15 May 1901 – 28 March 1980) was an Australian rules footballer who played with Geelong in the Victorian Football League (VFL).
