= Rabbi Alexander S. Gross Hebrew Academy =

Private yeshiva school in Miami Beach, Florida, USA

Location
- 2400 Pine Tree Drive; Miami Beach, Florida 33140; United States
- Coordinates: 25.800707°N 80.130290°W

Information
- Type: Private school · Yeshiva
- Religious affiliation: Modern Orthodox Judaism
- Established: February 1947
- Founder: Aaron S. Lauer
- Head of School: Lisa Stroll
- Grades: Infant–12
- Gender: Coeducational
- Enrollment: Approx. 650
- Colors: Blue and White
- Mascot: Warriors
- Website: hebrewacademymiami.org

The Rabbi Alexander S. Gross Hebrew Academy (also known as RASG Hebrew Academy or Hebrew Academy) is a private coeducational college preparatory yeshiva and Modern Orthodox Jewish day school located in Miami Beach, Florida. The school has been awarded a Blue Ribbon School of Excellence and is ranked among the top Jewish K-12 schools in the United States.

== History ==
According to Joseph I. Lauer, in November 1946 a meeting was set up by his father Aaron S. Lauer at The Tides of Miami Beach with the purpose of setting up a yeshiva. The meeting, which was attended by The Tides owner Samuel N. Grundwerg, the school's first president David S. Andron and a few other community activists, ended with brothers Ira and Joseph Rosenzweig of Brooklyn contributing $10,000 towards the establishment of the yeshiva. In the next month, Lauer asked Torah Umesorah for help, and they sent Alexander S. Gross on fundraising trips. Classes began in February 1947 with a kindergarten and six students in first grade, which were housed in two rooms of the YMHA community center located at 1 Lincoln Road. Later, the Hebrew Academy moved into the former Methodist Church building at 918 Sixth Street. By 1950, the school had already gone through two principals when Lauer suggested that Gross be appointed to the role. The latter was instrumental in Hebrew Academy's development as the first Orthodox Jewish Day School south of Baltimore.

The school is currently expanding with a new middle and high school building planned for the near future at its Pine Tree Drive campus.

== Academics ==
Hebrew Academy has grown to a student body of approximately 650 students, educating children from six weeks of age through grade 12. Under the leadership of Head of School Lisa Stroll, who joined the Hebrew Academy family in 2024, students complete daily coursework in conversational Hebrew, the study of Chumash, Talmud, and Judaic history. Mrs. Stroll holds a Bachelor's in Elementary Education from the University of Alberta and a Master's in Educational Leadership from Concordia University, and previously served as head of the Denver Academy of Torah.

In addition to a full Judaic curriculum, students receive instruction in college preparatory math, language arts, science, and social studies, with opportunities to participate in 11 Advanced Placement courses, as well as art, music, performance arts, and world language programs. The school is also designated as a STEM institution. The school maintains a student-to-teacher ratio of 5:1, and 99% of graduates go on to attend four-year colleges and universities. The school is a member of the National Association for the Education of Young Children and the National Society of Hebrew Day Schools.

The College Guidance department, led by Director Noa Bejar, provides personalized counseling for students from 9th through 12th grade through an open-door policy, helping students find universities and colleges that suit their needs, interests, and abilities. Recent graduating classes have earned acceptance to institutions including the University of Florida, University of Miami, Brandeis University, Northeastern University, Vassar College, Ohio State University, Purdue University, and Yeshiva University, among many others.

Graduates of the Hebrew Academy subsequently attend universities and yeshivot worldwide. Hebrew Academy is the only religious, Zionistic, and college preparatory school in Miami-Dade County.

== Athletics ==
As members of the Florida High School Athletic Association (FHSAA), students compete at the 2A level in organized sports against other private schools in girls and boys volleyball, girls and boys basketball, girls and boys soccer, girls and boys tennis, girls and boys flag football, and girls and boys cross country. The school fields 27 athletic teams with approximately 80% student participation across all programs. There are also clubs, shabbatonim, school field trips, and other activities that provide students with a full school life.

The Varsity Basketball program began under Coach Robert "Bob" King and Assistant Coach Jonathan Grossman in the 1981–1982 school year. The first basket in RASG Varsity history was scored in the St. Patrick's gym by freshman Rich Scharlat on a pass from senior Jay Schechter. Avi Littwin, Bernie Schuster, and Gil Neuman also played significant roles for the varsity that year.

In 2013, standout basketball player Ellis Greenstein led the Warriors to a FHSAA JV Championship and received MVP honors for averaging 16.7 points a game and 5.9 assists per game. Fellow players Nathan Miller, Mikey Shakib, and Caleb Katz played large roles in helping the Warriors reach the championship.

The Warrior Girls Varsity Basketball team won District Championships in 2011, 2012, 2013, and 2014. Under head coach Joe Campodonico, who has amassed over 100 wins and led the program to 5 district championship appearances and 4 FHSAA State Tournament appearances, the team claimed the District Championship again in 2025. The team is consistently ranked inside the Jewish Hoops America Top 18, finishing the most recent season ranked #8 among the best Jewish girls teams in the country and inside the top 130 in Florida — the highest ranking among all South Florida Jewish schools. Junior guard Eliana Wolfson was a driving force in the team's success, averaging 19.4 points per game and earning a place on the 1st Team All-Jewish Hoops America.

The Boys Varsity Basketball team won the Tier 2 Championship at Yeshiva University's Serachek Tournament in 2016. Caleb Gdanski reached the milestone of 1,000 career points, a landmark achievement in Warriors basketball history.

Hebrew Academy Junior Ben Tal was named Underclassman of the Year and placed on the 1st Team by All Jewish Hoops America. An Honorable Mention was also received by Junior Jack Esformes.

The school has announced a new Sports Complex Project, representing a significant investment in athletic facilities and signaling a new era for Warriors Athletics.

== Honors ==
The school has been awarded a Blue Ribbon School of Excellence.

In 2008, Miami-Dade County Commission Chairman Bruno A. Barreiro presented the "Key to the County" to several families and individuals who have made significant contributions to RASG Hebrew Academy. During the award it was also noted that the Hebrew Academy was the oldest Jewish Day School in the state of Florida. The presentation was part of the 60th Anniversary Diamond Dinner celebration where Sumner Redstone, the executive chairman of the Board for Viacom and CBS, delivered the keynote speech and received a "Distinguished Visitor" recognition.

As of 2026, Niche ranks Hebrew Academy #6 among the Best Jewish K-12 Schools in America, #4 among the Best Jewish K-12 Schools in Florida, and #26 among the Best Private K-12 Schools in Florida, with an overall grade of A+.

Several educators associated with the school have won notable awards: Rabbi Chaim Benhamou, a Bible, Talmud, Philosophy, and Art teacher for 9th–12th grade students, received the 2007 Grinspoon-Steinhardt Awards for Excellence in Jewish Education, sponsored by the Jewish Life Network of Michael Steinhardt.

== Notable alumni ==
- Shmuley Boteach, rabbi, author, TV host, and public speaker
- Ron Dermer, Israeli Ambassador to the United States
- Sam Grundwerg
- Brett Ratner, film director and producer
