= M. Mariappa Bhat =

Munglimane Mariappa Bhat (Kannada: ಎಂ.ಮರಿಯಪ್ಪಭಟ್ಟ; 27 July 1906 – 21 March 1980) was a Kannada scholar, linguist and lexicographer who served as Head of the Kannada department of the University of Madras from 1959 to 1966. He also served as Principal of the Oriental Manuscripts Library and was one of the founders of Karnataka Sangha Chennai. In 1971, Bhat published a revised edition of Ferdinand Kittel's Kannada-English dictionary.

== Early life and education ==
Bhat was born on 27 July 1906 at Kabaka in the South Canara district of Madras Presidency as the oldest of three sons of Govinda Bhat and Kaveri Amma. After his schooling in the village, in 1925, Bhat joined St. Aloysius College and obtained his B.A. in Kannada in 1928. After obtaining his M.A. in 1930, Bhat worked at Hoskote before joining the University of Madras as lecturer in 1937.

== Works ==
- Bhat, M. Mariappa (1943). Plural suffixes in Dravidian languages. University of Madras.
- Bhat, M. Mariappa; Kedilaya, A. Shankar (1967). Tulu-English Dictionary. University of Madras.
- Bhat, M. Mariappa (1983). A Havyaka-English dictionary. University of Madras.
