= Wilhelm Weber (SS officer) =

German officer and Knight's Cross recipient (1918–1980)

- Born: 19 March 1918; Pivitsheide, German Empire
- Died: 2 March 1980 (aged 61); Bensheim, West Germany
- Military career
- Allegiance: Nazi Germany
- Branch: Army
- Service years: 1937–45
- Rank: Obersturmführer
- Unit: SS Division Charlemagne
- Conflicts: World War II: Battle of Berlin
- Awards: Knight's Cross of the Iron Cross

Wilhelm Weber (19 March 1918 – 2 March 1980) was a mid-level commander in the Waffen-SS of Nazi Germany during World War II. He was a member of the SS Division Charlemagne and was a recipient of the Knight's Cross of the Iron Cross.

In April 1945, about 350 men of the division volunteered to go to fight in the Battle of Berlin in a unit which became known as Sturmbataillon Charlemagne. Weber went with the group to Berlin as a group commander. During the fighting on 29 April, Weber was wounded and evacuated to the make-shift field hospital in the basement of the Reich Chancellery. It was his sixth combat wound of the war. While there he briefed area commander, SS-Brigadeführer Wilhelm Mohnke as to the situation along front lines of the government district. He was awarded the Knight's Cross of the Iron Cross by Mohnke on 29 April.

== Awards and decorations ==
- Knight's Cross of the Iron Cross on 29 April 1945 as Obersturmführer and leader of the divisions combat school of the 33. Freiwilligen-Grenadier-Division der SS "Charlemagne"
