= Alex W. Bealer =

American businessman

Alexander Winkler Bealer, III
- Born: March 6, 1921; Valdosta, Georgia, U.S.
- Died: March 17, 1980 (aged 59); Atlanta, Georgia, U.S.
- Resting place: Arlington Memorial Park in Sandy Springs, Georgia
- Education: Boys High School in Atlanta; Emory University
- Occupations: Advertising executive; Blacksmith; Author
- Political party: Republican
- Spouse: Helen Eitel (m. 1947)
- Children: Alexander W. Bealer, IV Janet Rodie; Alice Bealer; Susie B. Duncan Edmund H. Bealer
- Parent(s): Alexander Winkler Bealer, Jr. Mary Louise Bealer

Alexander Winkler Bealer, III, known as Alex W. Bealer (March 6, 1921 – March 17, 1980), was an old-time craftsman of woodworking and blacksmithing from Atlanta, Georgia. He authored The Art of Blacksmithing Old Ways of Working Wood, The Tools That Built America, and The Successful Craftsman..

== Early life ==
Bealer was born on March 6, 1921, in Valdosta, Georgia. He was brought by his parents to Atlanta when he was two. He attended Boys Hill School and later Emory University. He entered the Marines shortly after World War II began, where he was promoted to captain at the end of the war. He returned to service when the Korean War began.

== Career ==
In the 1960s, he was involved in the Georgia Republican Party, where he ran for chairman in 1964. He was defeated, and Joseph Tribble was elected chair.

== Personal life ==
He married his Helen Eitel, on February 14, 1947. They remained married until his death.
