= Douglas Waring =

British mining businessman (1904–1980)

Yang Berbahagia Tan Sri Sir Douglas Tremayne Waring PMN(K) Kt CBE
- Born: 16 April 1904
- Died: 5 March 1980 (aged 75)
- Education: Rossall School
- Occupation: Mining businessman

Sir Douglas Tremayne Waring CBE (16 April 1904 – 5 March 1980) was a leading British tin mining industry businessman in Malaya.

== Early life and education ==
Waring was born on 16 April 1904, the son of Rev C. T. Waring of Oxted, Surrey. He was educated at Rossall School.

== Career ==
Waring qualified as a Chartered Accountant in 1927, and that year joined the London Tin Corporation. Later, he joined Anglo-Oriental (Malaya) Ltd in Malaya, which in the 1930s became a subsidiary of Anglo-Oriental Mining Corporation in a joint venture with the London Tin Corporation, creating interlinking directorates and shareholdings, and consolidating interests in the tin industry in Malaya. He became a director of Anglo-Oriental (Malaya) Ltd in 1934, and went on to serve as chairman from 1952 to 1959, while also serving on the board of other tin mining companies operating and registered in Malaya. In 1952, 1955, and 1956, he served as President of the Federated Malay States, Chamber of Mines.

During the Second World War, he served with the Federated Malay States Volunteer Force and was incarcerated as a POW in Malaya and Siam from 1942 to 1945. From 1948 to 1959 he served as member of the Legislative and Executive Council, Federation of Malaya, representing the mining industry. From 1961 to 1972, he served as chairman of the London Tin Corporation, having previously been its deputy chairman, and from 1963 to 1973, served as a member of the Malayan Chamber of Mines, London.

== Personal life and death ==
Waring was a horse racing enthusiast who owned race horses, and for many years was Chairman of Selangor Turf Club.

Waring died on 5 March 1980, aged 75.

== Honours ==
Waring was appointed Commander of the Order of the British Empire (CBE) in the 1953 Coronation Honours. He was created a Knight Bachelor in the 1957 New Year Honours. In 1961, he was awarded the Panglima Mangku Negara (Hon.).

- United Kingdom :
  - Commander of the Order of the British Empire (CBE) (1953)
  - Knight Bachelor (Kt) – Sir (1957)
- Malaya :
  - Honorary Commander of the Order of the Defender of the Realm (PMN (K)) – Tan Sri (1961)
