= Friedrich Züblin =

Swiss textile industrialist

- Born: May 10, 1803; St. Gallen, Switzerland
- Died: November 1, 1883 (aged 80); Burgdorf, Switzerland
- Occupations: Merchant, textile industrialist
- Known for: Co-founding textile mills in southern Italy and Switzerland

Friedrich Züblin (10 May 1803 – 1 November 1883) was a Swiss merchant and textile industrialist from St. Gallen. He played a significant role in the early development of the Swiss textile industry in southern Italy and managed several spinning mills in Austria and Switzerland.

== Biography ==
=== Early life and family ===
Züblin was born on 10 May 1803 in St. Gallen into a Protestant family. His father, Christian Züblin, was co-owner of the muslin factory Mittelholzer & Züblin, and his mother was Sabina Elsbeth Zollikofer. In 1831, he married Martha Z., his cousin, daughter of Christoph Züblin.

=== Career ===
Züblin stepped in for his ailing father as sales representative in northern and central Italy in 1821. In 1824, he co-founded with David Vonwiller the trading house Zueblin & Vonwiller in Naples, and in 1830, the spinning mill Vonwiller Zueblin & C. in Fratte di Salerno, which he directed until 1837. Back in St. Gallen, he built the linen spinning mill in the Sitter valley in 1838.

He subsequently directed the cotton spinning mill of Pottendorf (Lower Austria) from 1850, the spinning mill of Sankt Georgen in Tablat from 1854, and the linen spinning mill of Burgdorf from 1860 to 1874, serving as chairman of its board of directors from 1874 until his death in 1883.

His autobiography (1883) is considered a valuable source on the early history of the Swiss textile industry in southern Italy.

== Bibliography ==
=== Archival records ===
- AFam Wenner, StASG

=== Secondary sources ===
- G. Wenner, "Die Spinnereidirektoren Caspar und Alphons Escher-Züblin in Salerno", in ZTb 1960, 1959, pp. 77–88
- G. Wenner, L'industria tessile salernitana dal 1824 al 1918, 1983
