= Jack Evans (American football) =

American football player (1905–1980)

No. 21
- Position: Blocking back

Personal information
- Born: January 2, 1900; Colorado Springs, Colorado, U.S.
- Died: March 11, 1980 (aged 74); Santa Ana, California, U.S.
- Listed height: 5 ft 9 in (1.75 m)
- Listed weight: 175 lb (79 kg)

Career information
- High school: Long Beach Polytechnic (Long Beach, California)
- College: California

Career history
- Green Bay Packers (1929)

Awards and highlights
- NFL champion (1929)

Career NFL statistics
- Games played: 2
- Games started: 2
- Stats at Pro Football Reference

John Vinson Evans (August 5, 1905 – March 11, 1980) was an American football blocking back for the Green Bay Packers of the National Football League (NFL). He played college football for California. He won an NFL championship in 1929 with the Packers.

== Biography ==
Evans was born John Alexander Evans on August 5, 1905, in Colorado Springs, Colorado.

== Career ==
Evans played collegiate football at the University of California, Berkeley.

He played with the Green Bay Packers during the 1929 NFL season. As such, he was a member of the 1929 NFL Champion Packers.

He died on March 11, 1980, in Santa Ana, California.
