= Alexander S. Gross =

American Orthodox rabbi

Rabbi Alexander Sender Gross
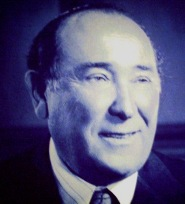

Personal life
- Born: 1917
- Died: March 10, 1980 (aged 62–63) Miami Beach, Florida
- Buried: Jerusalem, Israel
- Spouse: Shirley Gross
- Children: Rabbi Shraga Gross, Ora Lee Kanner, Rabbi Karmi Gross, Ephraim Gross, Gila Schwerd
- Education: Torah Vodaath, Columbia University, University of Miami

Religious life
- Religion: Judaism
- Denomination: Orthodox

Jewish leader
- Successor: Rabbi Yosef Heber
- Position: Principal
- Yeshiva: Rabbi Alexander S. Gross Hebrew Academy
- Semikhah: Torah Vodaath

Alexander S. Gross (1917 – March 10, 1980), was an American Orthodox rabbi who established the Hebrew Academy of Greater Miami, the first Orthodox Jewish day school south of Baltimore, Maryland. Gross played a central role in the establishment of Jewish life in south Florida.

A graduate of Yeshiva Torah Vodaath and the Mesivta , he was also educated at Columbia University. In addition, he studied advanced Jewish Studies at the University of Miami.

Gross was the president of the Rabbinical Alliance of America, was active in the United Jewish Appeal and in the State of Israel Bonds, was regional chairman of Torah U'Mesorah, and was a member of the Rabbinical Council of America's educational committee. He was a strong supporter of Israel, visiting in 1963, and spending a sabbatical year there in 1973–74. Gross was a close student of Rabbi Shraga Feivel Mendlowitz, the founder of Torah U'Mesorah, an outreach and educational organization, that was described by the words of Rabbi Moshe Feinstein: "Were it not for him, there would be no Torah study and no Fear of Heaven at all in America."
