= Walter Lock (cricketer) =

English cricketer

Personal information
- Full name: Walter George Lock
- Born: 11 October 1907; Bristol, England
- Died: 10 March 1980 (aged 72); Taunton, Somerset, England

Domestic team information
- Years: Team
- 1928: Somerset

Career statistics
Competition	FC
Matches	1
Runs scored	2
Batting average	2.00
100s/50s	0/0
Top score	2
Catches/stumpings	0/–
- Source: CricketArchive, 22 December 2015

Walter George Lock (11 October 1907 in Bristol – 10 March 1980 in Taunton, Somerset) was a cricketer who played one first-class match for Somerset in 1928.

Lock batted at No 9 in the first Somerset innings of the match against Essex at Chelmsford, and did not bat in the second innings of a match that Somerset won convincingly. Cricket websites do not indicate his batting style, and in his one first-class match, he did not bowl.
