= Rudolf Schmidt (sculptor) =

Austrian sculptor

- Born: 19 April 1894; Vienna, Austria-Hungary
- Died: 7 March 1980 (aged 85); Vienna, Austria
- Occupation: Sculptor

Rudolf Schmidt (19 April 1894 – 7 March 1980) was an Austrian sculptor. His work was part of the sculpture event in the art competition at the 1936 Summer Olympics.
