= Saad Nadim =

Egyptian film director

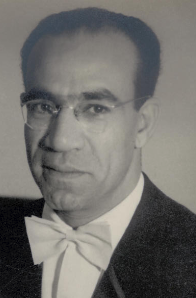
- Born: February 17, 1920; Boulaq
- Died: March 11, 1980 (aged 60)
- Citizenship: Egypt
- Occupation: Documentary film director

Saad Nadim (Arabic: سعد نديم; February 17, 1920 – March 11, 1980) was an Egyptian documentary film director, considered by many the pioneer of documentary cinema in Egypt and the Arab world.

== Early life ==
Born on February 19, 1920, in Boulaq, an old suburb of Cairo, Saad arrived shortly after the Egyptian Revolution of 1919, which led to his father naming him after the leader of that revolution, Saad Zaghloul, who was an inspirational figure in Egyptian political scene at the time.

Saad joined "Al Farouq" School which was one of the revolting spots from which the demonstrations against colonialism, oppression and foreign privileges took place. Saad was dismissed from the school several times for incitement to demonstrate and eventually finished high school and joined the Faculty of Law in the Cairo university in 1939. Not really fond of the academic nature of his studies in the faculty of law, young Saad decided to drop out and discontinue his law studies. He was deeply affected by Paul Rotha's book "The Documentary Film" which later had a big impact on his career in the years to come, a book he borrowed from his cousin and future business partner, the film director Salah Abu Seif. Mesmerized by the world of documentary cinema, Nadim joined the Cinema Institute in 1944 where his passion for Documentary films evolved leading to a long and prosperous career in the documentary film industry.

== Work ==
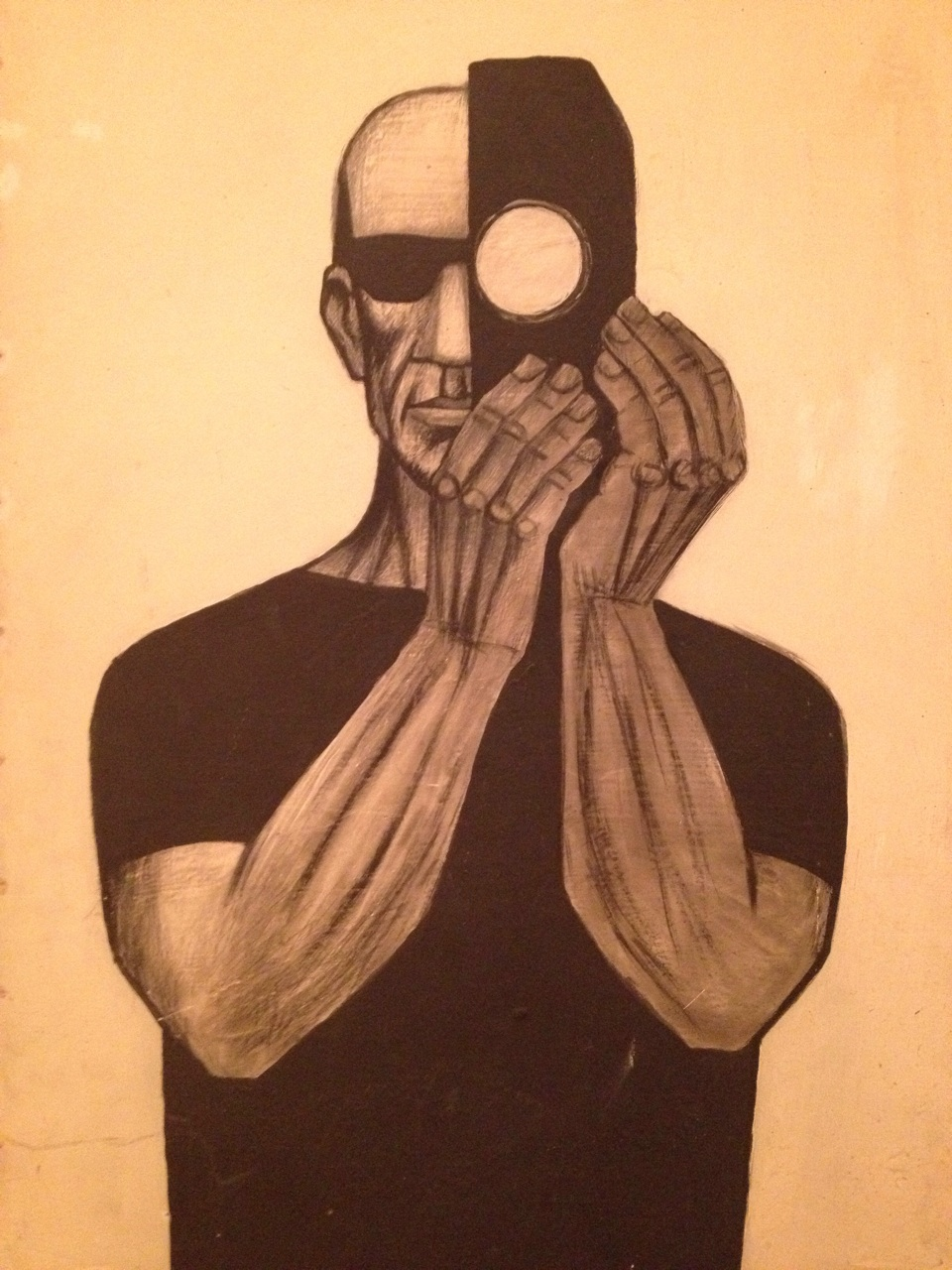
Portrait of Saad Nadim by Croatian artist Hans Lesjak

In the summer of 1944 Saad went to Studio Masr to start his first job as an Editor Assistant in the montage section, which was headed by his cousin Salah Abu Saif. He quickly fell in love with the job as it fits his artistic tendency as well as his personal choice. He learned that arranging shots is one of the most important stages of the film making and that even if the editor has a weak piece of work he must transfer it by cutting, deleting and adjusting the tempo to a coherent and attractive piece of art.

Nadim worked as an assistant for the head of the montage section, Salah Abu Seif in many feature films and really benefited from the experience of the film "Saif Al-Galad" (the Whipper's sword). Cutting and arranging one shot after the other, this movie was growing more and more consistent and the result was that most of the critics praised the montage of the film when it was screened at Cannes Film Festival in 1946.

After less than a year of his work in the montage section, he had the opportunity to work on his first solo editing work in the film “Dunia” directed by Mohammed Karim as recognition of his abilities. For over a quarter of a century he will be involved in the documentary filming as a director, screenwriter, production manager, tutor and the head manager of the National Center for documentary films. He worked on nearly 70 films in almost every category of documentaries: cultural, scientific, artistic, national, news and advertising.

== Culture and Leisure Group ==
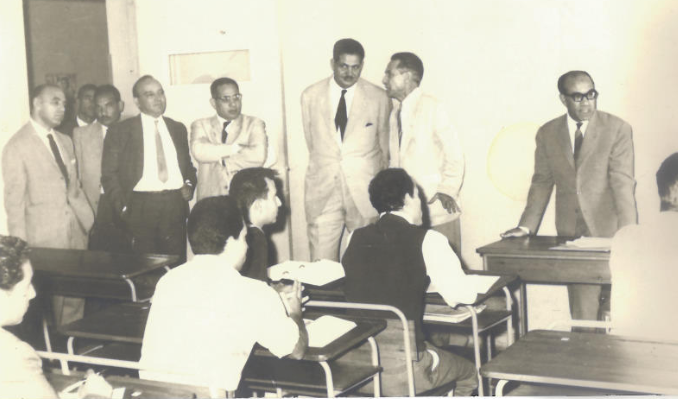
Saad Nadim during a lecture in the Cinema institute

Saad Nadim was not just a literal director, Despite his serious interest in all the elements of documentary films, his desire for change was the force which drove him towards the cultural activities. Saad Nadim, Salah Abu Seif, Mohamed Odeh and Asaad Halim established a group and named it the "Culture & Leisure Group". They held seminars where they discussed serious issues concerning ideas, art and reality.

His public activity increased after he was elected as the Secretary of The Cinema Syndicate. As the Syndicate had an educational role for the first time in 1947 when Saad Nadim organized classical shows for German mime cinema.

== Travel to London ==
The Egyptian Government decided to send four young men to England to study various branches, including Saad Nadim for directing. For Saad, England was the mother country of documentary films, which consist of various trends, cultural waves and psychological backgrounds. He was in need of this scholarship after the death of his wife, Bothaina al Nahry, the artist with whom he used to share his aspirations and with whom he had his first son, Anaan.

In England Saad Nadim’s expectations were fulfilled as he found in London a great revival in the film making. In England the universities used to organize uncertified film courses where one of the industry leaders provide students with his theoretical and practical experience and Saad Nadim joined one of these courses at London University.

In the lectures he met “Ahmed Al-Hadary”, a young Egyptian engineering student and a big cinema fan – the dean of the Cinema Institute and the Director of the National Center for Film Culture in the future. Al-Hadary was a prominent member of the “Egyptian Club" which used to sponsor student affairs in England and provide students with discounted tickets to attend theatre performances and musicals, allowing Saad Nadim, Salah Ezz El-Din with the company of Ahmed Al-Hadary of course to see the world classical theatre. And when he met the father of documentary films, John Grierson, and talked to him about his passion for studying documentary film making, he prepared for him a comprehensive course for one and a half years in the motion picture unit attached to "The transportation Authority".

His social connections had grown with the documentary filmmakers in London. When the English filmmaker Sir Arthur Elton, 10th Baronet, who was working in Shell Oil came to Egypt in 1953, he visited the company in Cairo and talked to the workers in the cinema section about that Egyptian man whom he met in London who will build a big legacy in the documentary industry and then he asked the public relations Department of the company to benefit from his energy when he return from England. Nadim worked for the Shell company during the 1950s.

In England Saad met his second wife, Sheila, with whom he had two children, Raamy and Magda.

== Filmography ==
Film	Year
Did you know	1946
Fishing City	
Arabian Horses	1947
Modern Egypt	1947
Sugar Industry in Egypt	
Kafr El-Dawwar Factories	
Alexandria	1950
Cairo	1955
Aswan	1959
To Helwan	1959
The Red Sea	1959
Kom Ombo	
Edfu	
A day in the countryside	1949
The Industry	
The Update	
Colorful Wings	1949
Archaeological Discoveries	
The Military Police	1954
In Suez Canal Area	1954
Signing the Evacuation Agreement	
The Victory Parade	1955
The 6th of October	1974
Towards a Better Nutrition	1954
The Mission of the Syrian Press	1955
Tanseek al Quahira	
The Story of a Book	
Building the Future	1955
Let the World Witness	1956
Evacuation Celebrations	1956
Petroleum in Egypt	
Museum of Civilization Series	
Amada & Ibrim	
Kalabsha & Beit Al Wadi	
Abu Simbel	
Saving Philae Temple	
Railroad Museum	
The Art of Our Country Series	
The Nubians	
A Story from the Nuba	1963
A trip to the Nuba Series	1961
Philae	
Kalbsha and Beit Al Wali	
From Dandar to El-Subo3	
From Amada to Ibrim	
Abu Simbel	
Heritage of the Humanity	
Life of the Residents	
The Artist Ragheb Ayad	1965
Contemporary Egyptian Art	1969
The Egyptian Sculptor Anwar Abdel Mawla	1970
Full-time in photography and sculpture	
The Egyptian In 50 years	1975
10 October and Culture	1975
Bhzaan in The Garden	1976
Shame on America	
We Are Not Alone	
Eye Witness	
Aggression towards The Arab Nation	1968
Peace Not Surrender	1957
The Road to Peace	1966
Defending Peace	1972
My Beautiful Country	1971
The Suez Canal	1979
Decoding Philae Temple	1975
Between Philae Island and Aiglka	1977
From Philae to Aiglka	1979
Diseases Spreaders	1948
Al-Mowasah Hospital	1949
Fayoum Water	1972
Fayoum Excavations	
Suez Canal Convention	1955
Culture in the Way to Evolution	1960
El-Mawled	1965
Youth Festival	1974

== Awards ==
- Film Review Award, 1960

- Scenario and directing awards from the Ministry of Culture, 1964

- Certificate of appreciation from the Leipzig Festival for "A story from Nuba"

== Sources ==
- "Saad Nadim: The Documentary Films Pioneer" - Kamal Ramzy

- "The Biography of the Documentary Films Pioneer Saad Nadim" - Mahmoud Sami Atallah

- Salah Ezz eldine, "Arab Documentary Film Production and the use of music in Arab films", United Nations Educational, Scientific and Cultural Organization Report, November 29, 1962
