= Baptist Reinmann =

German footballer

Personal information
- Date of birth: 31 October 1903
- Date of death: 4 March 1980 (aged 76)
- Position: Midfielder

Senior career*
Years	Team	Apps	(Gls)
1926–1935	1. FC Nürnberg		

International career
1927–1929	Germany	4	(0)
- * Club domestic league appearances and goals

Baptist Reinmann (31 October 1903 – 4 March 1980) was a German international footballer. He was part of Germany's team at the 1928 Summer Olympics, but he did not play in any matches.
