= Beat Wilhelm von Waldkirch =

Swiss politician (1744–1816)

Member of the Petit Conseil of Schaffhausen
- In office 1803–1814

Personal details
- Born: 12 June 1744 Schaffhausen
- Died: 16 May 1816 (aged 71) Schaffhausen
- Spouse: Maria Magdalena Stokar von Neunforn (m. 1772)
- Parent(s): Bernhardin von Waldkirch; Anna Sabina Gossweiler

Beat Wilhelm von Waldkirch (12 June 1744 – 16 May 1816) was a Swiss politician from Schaffhausen. He was the son of Bernhardin von Waldkirch, a dragoon captain, colonel and councillor, and of Anna Sabina Gossweiler. In 1772 he married Maria Magdalena Stokar von Neunforn, daughter of the cavalry captain Georg Ludwig Stokar von Neunforn.

== Career ==
Waldkirch became a member of the municipal court of Schaffhausen in 1768 and a parish councillor from 1781. He sat in the National Assembly of Schaffhausen in 1798 and served in the Grand Council. From 1799 he was provost of the Merchants' Society, and between 1803 and 1814 he was a member of the Small Council. He acted as government commissioner sent to the municipality of Rüdlingen from 1805 to 1809, and in 1809 he was a delegate to the Diet.
