= George Watts (cricketer) =

English cricketer

George Herbert Watts (18 February 1867 – 22 April 1949) was an English first-class cricketer active 1890–92 who played for Surrey. He was born and died in Cambridge.
