= Josef Kroll =

Josef Kroll (8 November 1889 – 8 March 1980) was a German classical philologist and university rector.

== Biography ==
Kroll was born into a catholic family in Arnsberg, a regional centre in the largely rural Hochsauerland region between Cologne and Kassel. His father was in business. He attended secondary school at Hagen and then moved on to undertake his university studies between 1908 and 1913 at the Ludwig-Maximilians-Universität München, the University of Freiburg, the Friedrich Wilhelm University of Berlin, the University of Münster, and the University of Göttingen. It was from the University of Münster that he received his doctorate in 1913/14 for a dissertation submitted the previous year entitled "The teachings of Hermes Trismegistus". He stressed the extent to which the theosophical doctrines of the "thrice-greatest Hermes" were based not simply on ancient oriental teachings, as had been assumed hitherto on account of research published by Richard Reitzenstein, but also leaned heavily on Greek philosophy. Kroll's work involved texts drawn from a number of different ancient religions. He subsequently expanded the dissertation to produce a more extensive publication which was picked out for commendation by the Vienna Academy because of the explanations it provided for inherently inscrutable traditions. During 1913/14 he undertook a study trip to Italy.

He then moved briefly to the University of Breslau (as Wrocław was known until 1945), where he held a post as a philological research assistant. However, war broke out towards the end of July 1914 and Kroll volunteered for military service. He was severely wounded twice, and after 1916 was once more able to progress his philological researches at Breslau. In 1918, still aged only 29, he accepted an invitation to take a full professorship in Classical Philology at the Braunsberg Catholic Academy near Königsberg, then one of the largest Jesuit schools in Europe.

In 1922, Kroll accepted an invitation to move to the University of Cologne, where he would remain till his retirement in 1956. His research concentrated above all on the early years of Christianity in the context of the heathen world surrounding it. His 1921 work "Die christliche Hymnodik bis zu Clemens von Alexandreia" finds the rare traces of lost early Christian hymns viewed through the sometimes contrasting prisms of surviving from Judaism and Greco-Roman paganism: it identifies connections between hymn texts and the liturgy. Kroll's major work, "Gott und Hölle" (1932, God and Hell) deals with the mythical motif of a God's descent into Hell, followed by a battle and victory over the Lord of the Dead. The starting point is the Christian presentation of Christ's descent into Hell on Good Friday, followed by the freeing of the righteous from the pre-Christian period, which is accomplished achieved through his victory over the Prince of Hell. For the underlying narrative Kroll drew from the apocryphal Gospel of Nicodemus and a number of later liturgical texts. He draws out the connections with the pre-existing traditional tales of visits to the underworld.

From his arrival at Cologne, Kroll saw it as his mission to extend the Institute for Classical Philology, embracing closely related subjects to create an "Institute for Ancient Studies". During the 1920s he made sure that Archeology became an established mainstream subject at the University of Cologne. He was elected to serve as Dean of the Philosophy Faculty during 1924/25, and as university rector during 1930/31. In January 1933 régime change at a national level quickly impacted the universities sector as the new Hitler government lost no time in transforming Germany into a one-party dictatorship: measures included steps to ensure that party members and/or supporters were installed in positions of power and influence. Kroll resigned his chairmanship of the university administration committee, and for the next twelve years he rejected all requests that he should involve himself in university committees and administration.

At the end of October 1944, Kroll nevertheless became deputy to University Rector Friedrich Bering who was sick, and whose duties Kroll therefore performed. He also filled in for Heinz Heimsoeth after the latter was sent to Marburg University as Dean of the Philosophy Faculty there. The formal role of the University of Cologne's rector was transferred to Kroll on an "acting" basis till 5 November 1945 when he was himself re-elected to the position on his own account. Between 1945 and 1950 he devoted considerable energy to reinstating academic self-government to the university, and he played a decisive role in the reconstruction of the University of Cologne following its almost total destruction during the final part of the war. On 3 July 1948 he was again re-elected as university rector, albeit by only a narrow majority. Through his period of office he rejected any party-political involvement by the university, preferring a relentless focus on practicalities. He treasured a commitment to Humboldtist universality which meant a rejection of the sort of excessive specialisation which, after his time, would be apparent in the separation of the Faculty for Mathematics and Natural Sciences from the broader Philosophical Faculty. In those critical post-war years he also articulated the real-world conflict between humanistic idealised calls for new beginnings in sciences and in teaching, and the pragmatic necessity sometimes to work with former National Socialist Party members. During his second postwar term as rector he oversaw the renaming of the "Kölner Hochschule" (loosely, "Cologne University") which now became the "Universität zu Köln" (loosely, "University at Cologne"), which involved the implementation of an initiative which he had himself introduced in the early 1930s.

Josef Kroll's contribution during the postwar years was not restricted to rebuilding the university. He engaged with numerous arts related projects. He campaigned successfully for the re-establishment of the Cologne Music Conservatory, for the Gürzenich Orchestra, for stage and concert venues, for the recovery and restoration of public art collections and, perhaps most importantly, for the re-opening of schools and public libraries. He was a founder member of the "Arbeitsgemeinschaft für Forschung des Landes Nordrhein-Westfalen" (loosely, "Extended Working Group for Research in [the newly created state of] North Rhine-Westphalia", and accepted a quasi-political appointment as Cologne "councillor" ("Beigeordneter") for Arts and Schooling. He worked closely with the Arts and Cultural Committee of the regional parliament (Landtag). He co-founded the Deutsche Forschungsgemeinschaft (DFG / loosely, "German Research Foundation") and the Studienstiftung ("German Academic Scholarship Foundation ").

Kroll died, aged 90, at Duisburg-Rheinhausen. The books from his private library, which concerned classical philology, were left in his will to Cologne's university and city libraries.

== Awards and honours (selection) ==
When he retired in 1956, Kroll was elected an honorary citizen of the University of Colonne ("Ehrenbürger der Universität zu Köln"). In 1959, he was honoured with the Order of Merit of the Federal Republic of Germany.

== Publications (selection) ==
- Die Lehren des Hermes Trismegistos. Aschendorff, Münster 1914 (Contributions to Geschichte der Philosophie des Mittelalters, XII, 2–4).
- Die christliche Hymnodik bis zu Klemens von Alexandreia. In: Verzeichnis der Vorlesungen an der Akademie zu Braunsberg 1921/1922. 2., überprüfte Auflage. Wissenschaftliche Buchgesellschaft, Darmstadt 1968.
- Die Himmelfahrt der Seele in der Antike. Rede, gehalten bei der feierlichen Übernahme des Rektorats der Universität am 8. Nov. 1930. Müller, Köln 1930.
- Gott und Hölle. Der Mythos vom Descensuskampfe. Teubner, Leipzig, Berlin 1932.
- Theognis-Interpretationen. Dieterich, Leipzig 1936.
- Elysium. Westdeutscher Verlag, Köln, Opladen 1953.
