= Ugo Capocchini =

Italian painter (1901–1980)

- Born: 1 February 1901; Barberino Val d'Elsa
- Died: 2 March 1980 (aged 79); Florence
- Known for: Painting

Ugo Capocchini (1 February 1901 – 2 March 1980) was an Italian artist. He won many awards throughout his career, and became a professor at the Accademia Di Belle Arti in Florence in the 1960s. In his birthplace, Barberino Val d'Elsa, a square and a community hall have been named after him.

== Early life ==
Ugo Capocchini moved from Barberino Val d'Elsa to Florence where he attended Liceo Artistico and later the Accademia di Belle Arti. He met Pietro Annigoni at the school of the Circolo Degli Artisti.

== Career ==
In 1928, he won the Panerai Award for his work "Nudo" at the Gallery of Modern Art of Firenze (Florence).

In the 1930s and 1940s, he attended with many contemporary artists and writers the Caffè Giubbe Rosse.

In 1940, he was invited to do a solo exhibition in the 1950 Venice Biennale.

Capocchini had his first solo exhibition in 1950 in the Strozzina at Palazzo Strozzi in Florence, and a second solo exhibition in 1961 at Gallery Vantaggio in Rome. The third solo exhibition in 1968 was held at Palazzo Strozzi in Florence.

In 1951, he received the Premio Michetti in Francavilla a Mare.

In 1954, he received the Premio Marzotto in Valdagno.

In 1955, he received the Fiorino d'Oro of Firenze.

In the 1960s, he was Professor at Accademia di Belle Arti of Florence.

In 2001, on the centenary of his birth, Barberino Val d'Elsa, his birthplace, dedicated a retrospective on his art.

Barberino Val d'Elsa also has dedicated a square and a community hall to him.

== Painting bibliography ==
His works appeared in:

- Allegri, Ettore. Ugo Capocchini: opere 1927-1977 : Palazzo Strozzi, Firenze (in Italian). Comune di Firenze.
- Cassinelli, Paola; Viggiano, Domenico (2001). Ugo Capocchini (in Italian). Edifir Edizioni Firenze. ISBN 978-88-7970-141-9.
