= Phyllis Hynes =

Botanist and botanical collector

- Born: Civil Sadler; 23 January 1897; Suffolk, England
- Died: 25 March 1980 (aged 83); Auckland, New Zealand
- Spouse: Henry William Hynes (m. 1926)
- Children: Mervyn Francis Hynes (1928 - 2018) Shirley Bernice "Bernie" Hynes (1930 - 2020)
- Scientific career
- Institutions: Auckland Botanical Society Auckland War Memorial Museum

Phyllis Hynes (née Civil Sadler; 23 January 1897 – 25 March 1980) was a botanist and botanical collector. She was born in Suffolk, England but lived most of her life in Balmoral, Auckland, New Zealand.

Her scientific research focussed on pteridophytes in Auckland. She was secretary for the Auckland Botanical Society for 15 years and was honoured for her significant contributions to Auckland Museum's herbarium collection.

== Biography ==
Phyllis Hynes was born on 23 January 1897 in Suffolk England.

Hynes worked as a secretary at the Auckland Botanical society from 1943–1956 and was described as a "walking encyclopaedia" for her extensive knowledge on plants and regular contributions to specimen collections at Auckland Museum.

== Death ==
Phyllis died on 25 March 1980, at the age of 83, and is buried at Purewa Cemetery. After her death the Auckland Botanical society commemorated her death with a botanical painting commission by Bruce Irwin.
