= Paul Molyneux =

English cricketer

Personal information
- Full name: Paul Seymour Morthier Molyneux
- Born: 12 January 1906; Wells, Somerset, England
- Died: 13 March 1980 (aged 74); Hove, Sussex, England
- Batting: Right-handed
- Bowling: Right-arm off-breaks
- Role: Batsman

Domestic team information
- Years: Team
- 1937: Somerset
- First-class debut: 22 May 1937 Somerset v Leicestershire
- Last First-class: 11 June 1937 Somerset v Surrey

Career statistics
Competition	First-class
Matches	6
Runs scored	94
Batting average	9.40
100s/50s	–/–
Top score	25
Balls bowled	–
Wickets	–
Bowling average	–
5 wickets in innings	–
10 wickets in match	–
Best bowling	–
Catches/stumpings	2/–
- Source: CricketArchive, 28 February 2011

Paul Seymour Morthier Molyneux (12 January 1906 – 13 March 1980) played first-class cricket for Somerset in six matches in the 1937 season. He was born at Wells, Somerset and died at Hove, Sussex.

Molyneux was a right-handed batsman, who batted for Somerset mostly in the middle order, though in his final match he came in at No 11 in both innings. He was also a right-arm off-break bowler, but did not bowl in first-class cricket. His Somerset career was confined to a period of less than a month in 1937, and his highest score was his first-ever innings: he made 25 against Leicestershire at Leicester.
