= Hans Dichgans =

German politician (1907 – 1980)

Member of the Bundestag
- In office 17 October 1961 – 22 September 1972

Personal details
- Born: 16 May 1907 Elberfeld
- Died: 21 March 1980 (aged 72) Düsseldorf, North Rhine-Westphalia, Germany
- Party: CDU

Hans Dichgans (16 May 1907 – 21 March 1980) was a German politician of the Christian Democratic Union (CDU) and former member of the German Bundestag.

== Life ==
In 1954 he became a member of the Christian Democratic Union of Germany and from 1955 was chairman of the CDU district group Lohausen-Stockum in Düsseldorf.

Dichgans was a member of the German Bundestag from 17 October 1961 to 22 September 1972 and was always elected via the state list of the CDU in North Rhine-Westphalia. From 1961 to 1970 he was a member of the European Parliament.

== Literature ==
Herbst, Ludolf; Jahn, Bruno (2002). Vierhaus, Rudolf (ed.). Biographisches Handbuch der Mitglieder des Deutschen Bundestages. 1949–2002 [Biographical Handbook of the Members of the German Bundestag. 1949–2002] (in German). München: De Gruyter - De Gruyter Saur. p. 1715. ISBN 978-3-11-184511-1.
