= Frank Spilling =

Australian rules footballer, born 1912

Personal information
- Full name: Frank Spilling
- Born: 23 October 1912
- Died: 13 March 1980 (aged 67)
- Original team: Fairfield

Playing career^{1}
Years	Club	Games (Goals)
1933–34, 1936	Footscray	14 (0)
- ^{1} Playing statistics correct to the end of 1936.

Frank Spilling (23 October 1912 – 13 March 1980) was a former Australian rules footballer who played with Footscray in the Victorian Football League (VFL).
