= Jim Moodie =

Australian rules footballer, born 1905

Personal information
- Full name: Jim Moodie
- Born: 1 December 1905
- Died: 6 March 1980 (aged 74)

Playing career^{1}
Years	Club	Games (Goals)
1928–30, 1932	Melbourne	16 (3)
- ^{1} Playing statistics correct to the end of 1932.

Jim Moodie (1 December 1905 – 6 March 1980) was an Australian rules footballer who played with Melbourne in the Victorian Football League (VFL).
