= David Howard Saunders =

American politician

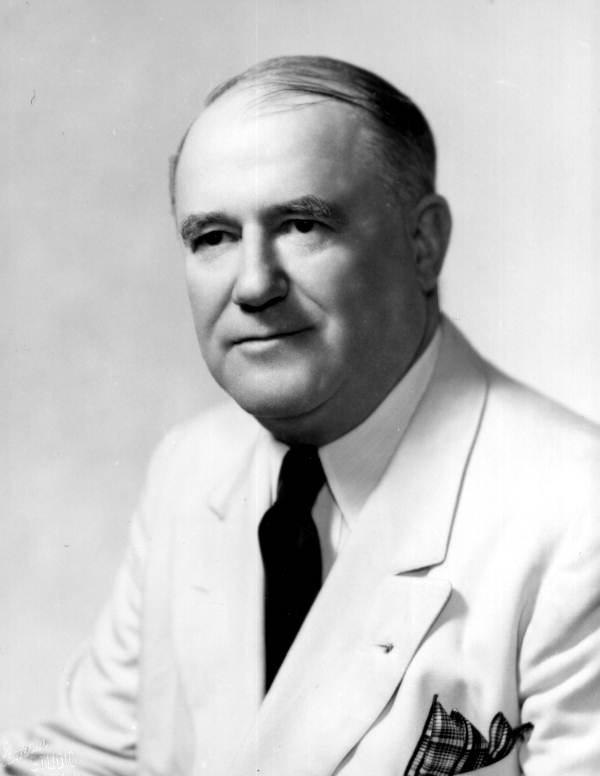
- Saunders in 1945

Member of the Florida House of Representatives from St. Lucie County
- In office 1945–1951

Personal details
- Born: July 16, 1890 Fairport, Michigan, U.S.
- Died: March 4, 1980 (aged 89)
- Party: Democratic

David Howard Saunders (July 16, 1890 – March 4, 1980), nicknamed "Banty", was an American politician. He served as a Democratic member of the Florida House of Representatives.

== Life and career ==
Saunders was born in Fairport, Michigan. He was a lay reader.

Saunders served in the Florida House of Representatives from 1945 to 1951.

Saunders died on March 4, 1980, at the age of 89.
