= Lucien Emerson =

Sport activist

Biographical details
- Born: May 5, 1890; Louisville, Kentucky, U.S.
- Died: March 1, 1980 (aged 89)

Lucien Parker Emerson (May 5, 1890 – March 1, 1980) was a basketball coach, football referee, and baseball club secretary. He coached high school basketball in the 1920s, including Hume-Fogg High School's girls' basketball team, and won a state title coaching men's basketball at Montgomery Bell Academy. Emerson coached Sewanee basketball from 1928 to 1930, posting a record of 17–28 (.378). He was secretary of the Nashville Vols baseball club from 1926 to 1928, and for the Chattanooga team afterwards.
