= Jacob Züblin =

Swiss politician (1653–1729)

Mayor of St. Gallen
- In office 1725, 1728

Personal details
- Born: 28 March 1653 St. Gallen
- Died: 19 January 1729 (aged 75) St. Gallen
- Occupation: Wool weaver, mayor

Jacob Züblin (28 March 1653 – 19 January 1729) was a Swiss wool weaver and politician from St. Gallen who served as mayor of the city (Amtsbürgermeister) in 1725 and 1728.

== Life ==
Züblin was born on 28 March 1653 in St. Gallen, the son of Ambrosius Züblin, a linen quality inspector and councillor, and Judith Eggmann. In 1679 he married Barbara Meyer, daughter of Georg Meyer, a Stubendiener (servant in charge of the drinking hall) of the weavers' guild. He worked as a wool weaver.

Züblin held numerous municipal offices in St. Gallen. He became master of the weavers' guild and vice-mayor in 1713, and in 1720 was elected by direct vote to the highest offices of the city (Reichsvogt, mayor, and former mayor). He served as Amtsbürgermeister in 1725 and 1728.

== Bibliography ==
- Kaiser, Markus: "Züblin, Jacob", in: Historical Dictionary of Switzerland, 2013 (revised 25 February 2014).
