= Barbara Massalska =

Polish artist and teacher

- Born: 1 January 1927; Warsaw, Poland
- Died: 20 March 1980 (aged 53); Gdańsk, Poland
- Known for: Painting, Sgraffito, Mosaic, Stained Glass

Barbara Massalska (1 January 1927 – 20 March 1980) was a Polish artist and teacher at the State High School of Plastic Arts (SHSPA), Gdańsk (now Gdańsk Academy of Fine Arts (pl:Akademia Sztuk Pięknych w Gdańsku)).

In her youth she took part in the Warsaw Uprising as a member of the Gray Ranks.

After graduating from the SHSPA in 1953, she continued to work at the school, where she directed workshops on murals and paintings. Her artistic interests included mosaics, murals, sgraffitos, paintings, and stained glass.

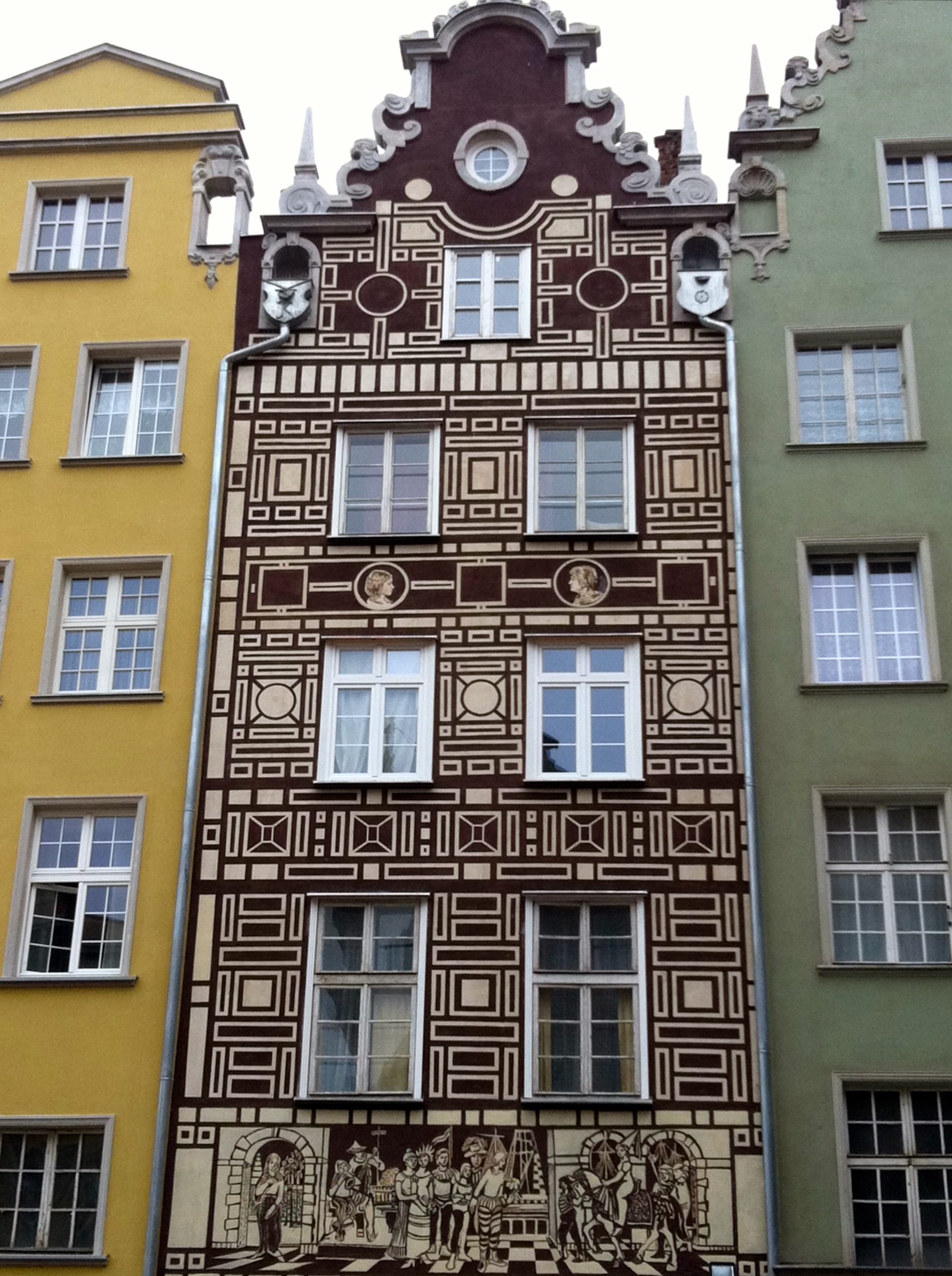
Sgraffito Long Market 26

In addition to her paintings being exhibited at national and international exhibitions and held in the collections at the Malbork Castle collection and at the National Museum, Gdańsk, she has stained glass windows in St Barbara's Church, Gdansk, and St Joseph's Church Gdansk. One of her sgraffito is on No. 26 Long Market: Lady on a horse and musicians, Gdansk.
