= Eric Orr (footballer) =

Australian rules footballer

Personal information
- Full name: Eric Orr
- Born: 31 August 1909; Eaglehawk, Victoria
- Died: 14 March 1980 (aged 70); Wycheproof, Victoria
- Height: 173 cm (5 ft 8 in)
- Weight: 73 kg (161 lb)

Playing career^{1}
Years	Club	Games (Goals)
1933	Geelong	11 (2)
- ^{1} Playing statistics correct to the end of 1933.

Eric Orr (31 August 1909 – 14 March 1980) was an Australian rules footballer who played with Geelong in the Victorian Football League (VFL).

Orr was recruited from Wycheproof.

He later served in the Australian Army during World War II.
