= John Edward Blair =

American bacteriologist and serologist

John Edward Blair (May 30, 1899, Monroe, Maine – March 26, 1980) was an American bacteriologist and serologist. He was the president of the American Society for Microbiology in 1962.

== Biography ==
Blair graduated in 1920 with a bachelor's degree from Clark University. At Brown University, he graduated in 1921 with an M.S. and in 1923 with a Ph.D. in bacteriology. From 1923 to 1926 he was an instructor in bacteriology at Stanford University. In 1927 he became a bacteriologist and serologist at Manhattan's Hospital for Joint Diseases. He headed the hospital's department of bacteriology from 1927 to 1964, when he became a consultant in bacteriology. In 1944, Blair and Joseph Buchman (1898–1965) at the Hospital for Joint Diseases were awarded a contract for the investigation of the effects of penicillin on osteomyelitis lesions. From 1964 to 1968 Blair was the head of the department of microbiology at Roosevelt Hospital (which is now named Mount Sinai West).

Blair did research on tuberculosis, staphylococcal infections, and staphylococcal phage typing. From 1958 to 1966 he chaired the International Commission on Staphylococcal Phage Typing of the International Union of Microbiological Societies.

He was elected in 1933 a fellow of the American Association for the Advancement of Science. In 1957 he received the Kimble Methodology Research Aeard.

In September 1923, John E. Blair married Lorraine Hunter Ferguson. They had two sons: Donald Ferguson and Malcolm John.

== Selected publications ==
- Blair, John E.; Reeves, David L. (1928). "The Placental Transmission of Bacteriophage". The Journal of Infectious Diseases. 42 (5): 440–443. doi:10.1093/infdis/42.5.440. JSTOR 30084361.
- ——; Hallman, Frances A. (1934). "Rheumatoid (Atrophic) Arthritis". Archives of Internal Medicine. 53: 87–96. doi:10.1001/archinte.1934.00160070092008.
- ——; Hallman, Frances A. (1935). "Streptococcal agglutinins and antistreptolysins in rheumatoid (atrophic) arthritis" (PDF). The Journal of Clinical Investigation. 14 (5): 505–515. doi:10.1172/JCI100701. PMC 424705. PMID 16694324.
- Buchman, Joseph; —— (1945). "Penicillin in the Treatment of Chronic Osteomyelitis". Archives of Surgery. 51 (2): 81–92. doi:10.1001/archsurg.1945.01230040086003. PMID 21005215.
- ——; Carr M; Buchman J (March 1946). "The Action of Penicillin on Staphylococci". The Journal of Immunology. 52 (3): 281–292. doi:10.4049/jimmunol.52.3.281. PMID 21018830. S2CID 5919673.
- ——; Bynoe, Evan T. (1958). "Variation in three staphylococcal typing phages". Public Health Reports. 73 (5): 465–466. doi:10.2307/4590154. JSTOR 4590154. PMC 1951590. PMID 13554736.
- —— (1958). "Laboratory diagnosis of staphylococcal infections". Bulletin of the World Health Organization. 18 (3): 291–307. PMC 2537661. PMID 13536794.
- —— (1958). "Factors Determining the Pathogenicity of Staphylococci". Annual Review of Microbiology. 12: 491–506. doi:10.1146/annurev.mi.12.100158.002423. PMID 13595615.
- ——; Williams, R. E. O. (1961). "Phage typing of staphylococci". Bulletin of the World Health Organization. 24 (6): 771–784. PMC 2555522. PMID 20604092.
- ——; Carr, Miriam (1961). "Lysogeny in Staphylococci". Journal of Bacteriology. 82 (6): 984–993. doi:10.1128/jb.82.6.984-993.1961. PMC 279286. PMID 13869737.
