= Georg Züblin =

Swiss military officer and legal scholar

- Born: June 9, 1904; Zurich, Switzerland
- Died: June 30, 1977 (aged 73) Männedorf, Switzerland
- Allegiance: Switzerland
- Branch: Swiss Army
- Rank: Lieutenant general
- Commands: Division de montagne 9 (1951–1956); Corps d'armée 3 (1958–1967)
- Education: ETH Zurich; École Supérieure de Guerre

Georg Züblin (9 June 1904 – 30 June 1977) was a Swiss military officer, lawyer, and military writer. He rose to the rank of Lieutenant general in the Swiss Army and was a prominent voice in mid-20th-century debates about Swiss military doctrine.

== Life and career ==
Züblin was born on 9 June 1904 in Zurich, the son of Anton Züblin, a lawyer and brigadier general, and Constance Wittwer. He was the brother of Albert Züblin. He married Huberta Anna Maria Simon, daughter of Fritz Simon. He was a Protestant and a citizen of St. Gallen and Küsnacht (ZH).

He completed his matura in Zurich in 1923 and studied law at the University of Zurich and the University of Berlin from 1923 to 1927, earning a doctorate in 1927. He subsequently practiced as a lawyer before entering a military career.

From 1931 he served as an infantry instructor officer, and from 1935 to 1946 as a General Staff officer. In 1935–1936 he attended the École Supérieure de Guerre in Paris. He went on to command the central schools (1947–1949) and the 9th mountain division (1951–1956). In 1957 he was appointed head of the mechanized and light troops branch, and from 1958 to 1967 he commanded the 3rd Army Corps (redesignated the 3rd Mountain Army Corps in 1962).

== Military thought ==
Züblin was a military writer and a lecturer in the military sciences section of ETH Zurich. In the debates of the late 1950s and early 1960s on the future of the Swiss Army, he argued — as a student of Gustav Däniker and following in the tradition of Ulrich Wille — for an offensive army equipped with substantial armored forces and led by professional officers.

== Bibliography ==
- Si vis pacem: Militärische Betrachtungen von Schweizern, 1964
