= Wade Marlette =

American athlete and coach (1900–1980)

Biographical details
- Born: March 1, 1900; Saxapahaw, North Carolina, U.S.
- Died: March 3, 1980 (aged 80); Jacksonville, Florida, U.S.

Playing career

Baseball
- 1920–1923: Elon
- 1923: Winston-Salem Twins
- Position: Shortstop

Coaching career (HC unless noted)

Football
- 1925–1936: High Point HS (NC)
- 1937–1941: Hebron Academy (ME)
- 1942: Bates

Head coaching record
- Overall: 3–3 (college football)

Wade Elmer Marlette (March 1, 1900 – March 3, 1980) was an American athlete and coach who played baseball, basketball, and football at Elon College and coached high school sports in North Carolina and Maine. He was the head football coach at Bates College for one season.

== Early life ==
Marlette was born on March 1, 1900, in Saxapahaw, North Carolina to Robert G. and Sarah Emily (Teague) Marlette. He attended Elon College High School, where he played football, baseball, and basketball.

Marlette attended Elon College, where he played four years of baseball, two years of football and basketball, and ran four seasons of cross-country and track. He was captain of the baseball, basketball, and track teams. After graduating in 1923, he played for the Winston-Salem Twins of the Piedmont League. He took post graduate courses as the University of North Carolina (1924), Harvard Summer School (1927 and 1928), and the University of Michigan (1928).

== Coaching ==
In 1925, Marlette began his coaching career at Elkin High School in Elkin, North Carolina. The following school year, he began a 12-year coaching tenure at High Point High School in High Point, North Carolina. In 1935, he became the city's recreation supervisor. In 1937, he became the head football coach at Hebron Academy in Hebron, Maine. He also coached the school's track team to four consecutive prep school championships.

Hebron suspended its athletic programs in 1942 due to financial issues. That summer, Marlette became the freshman coach at Bates College. Soon thereafter, he was promoted to varsity football coach after Ducky Pond entered the United States Navy. Marlette himself left the school that winter to become a lieutenant in the United States Navy Reserve. Marlette was a physical training officer in the United States Navy from 1942 to 1945 and served oversees from 1944 to 1945. He was discharged with the rank of lieutenant commander.

== Later life ==
In 1946, Marlette entered in the furniture business in Rock Hill, South Carolina. Three years later, he sold his interest the business and reentered the United States Navy. During the 1960s, he was a math teacher and tennis coach at High Point Central High School.

Marlette died in Jacksonville, Florida on March 3, 1980. He was posthumously inducted into the Elon Sports Hall of Fame that fall.

== Head coaching record ==
=== College football ===
Year	Team	Overall	Conference	Standing	Bowl/playoffs
Bates Bobcats (Maine Intercollegiate Athletic Association) (1942)
1942	Bates	3–3			
Bates:		3–3			
Total:		3–3			
