= Werner Coninx =

Swiss artist and collector (1911–1980)

- Born: 28 July 1911; Zürich, Switzerland
- Died: 10 March 1980; Zürich, Switzerland
- Relatives: de: Otto Coninx-GirardetOtto Coninx-Girardet (father); Otto Coninx-Wettstein (brother); Pietro Supino (grandson)

Werner Coninx (born & died in Zürich, 28 July 1911 – 10 March 1980) was a Swiss artist, art collector and patron.

== Life ==
Werner Coninx was the son of the publisher Otto Coninx-Girardet, who had founded the Tages-Anzeiger, then as now one of Zürich’s and Switzerland’s top selling newspapers. In the city theirs was already a leading family in terms of wealth and influence. Werner had a seat on the board of the family publishing company between 1942 and 1978, but his role within the publishing business was not an active one. Instead he devoted his life to art while his brother, Otto Coninx-Wettstein, ran the business.

Werner Coninx built up a significant art collection which was transferred, in 1973, to the Coninx Foundation. Today the collection belongs in the Coninx Museum which occupies the house where Werner once lived, in the Hottingen district on the east side of Zürich.

Werner Coninx was the father of Severin Coninx and Rena Coninx, which made him the grandfather of the media magnate Pietro Supino. He was also a close friend to Max Frisch, whom he met originally at school and whom he financed after Frisch (temporarily) set aside his literary ambitions in order to study and qualify as an architect.

== Criticism ==
In January 2022, in a Die Weltwoche article entitled "Raubkunst der Familie Coninx", Christoph Mörgeli criticised the Werner Coninx collection for its lack of Nazi-era provenance research.
