= Albert Züblin =

Swiss military officer and lawyer

- Born: July 13, 1905; Zurich, Switzerland
- Died: March 5, 1980 (aged 74); Männedorf, Switzerland
- Occupations: Lawyer, military officer
- Known for: Swiss army general staff officer

Albert Züblin (13 July 1905 – 5 March 1980) was a Swiss lawyer and military officer who served in the Swiss Army from 1940 to 1970, reaching the rank of colonel. He is known for his advocacy of a mobile combat doctrine in Swiss defense policy debates after World War II.

== Life and career ==
Züblin was born in Zurich on 13 July 1905, the son of Anton Züblin, a lawyer and brigadier, and Constance Wittwer. He was the brother of Georg Züblin. In 1935, he married Fanny Ammann, daughter of Albert Ammann.

He studied law at the University of Zurich from 1924 to 1929, earning his doctorate in 1929, and subsequently practiced as a lawyer.

Züblin served as a general staff officer from 1940 to 1970, attaining the rank of colonel in 1951. He served as chief of staff of the 6th Division (1949–1952) and of the 4th Army Corps (1957–1958), and commanded Infantry Regiment 26.

In post-1945 debates on Swiss national defense, Züblin advocated for an army oriented toward mobile intervention, pursuing operational victories through combined-arms combat. He was a member of the Association for the Promotion of the Will to Defend and of Defense Science (Vereinigung zur Förderung des Wehrwillens und der Wehrwissenschaft), in the circle of Rudolf Farner and Gustav Däniker.

== Bibliography ==
- L'État-major, vol. 8, p. 411.
