= Latif Imanov =

Soviet physicist (1922–1980)

Latif Mukhtar oglu Imanov
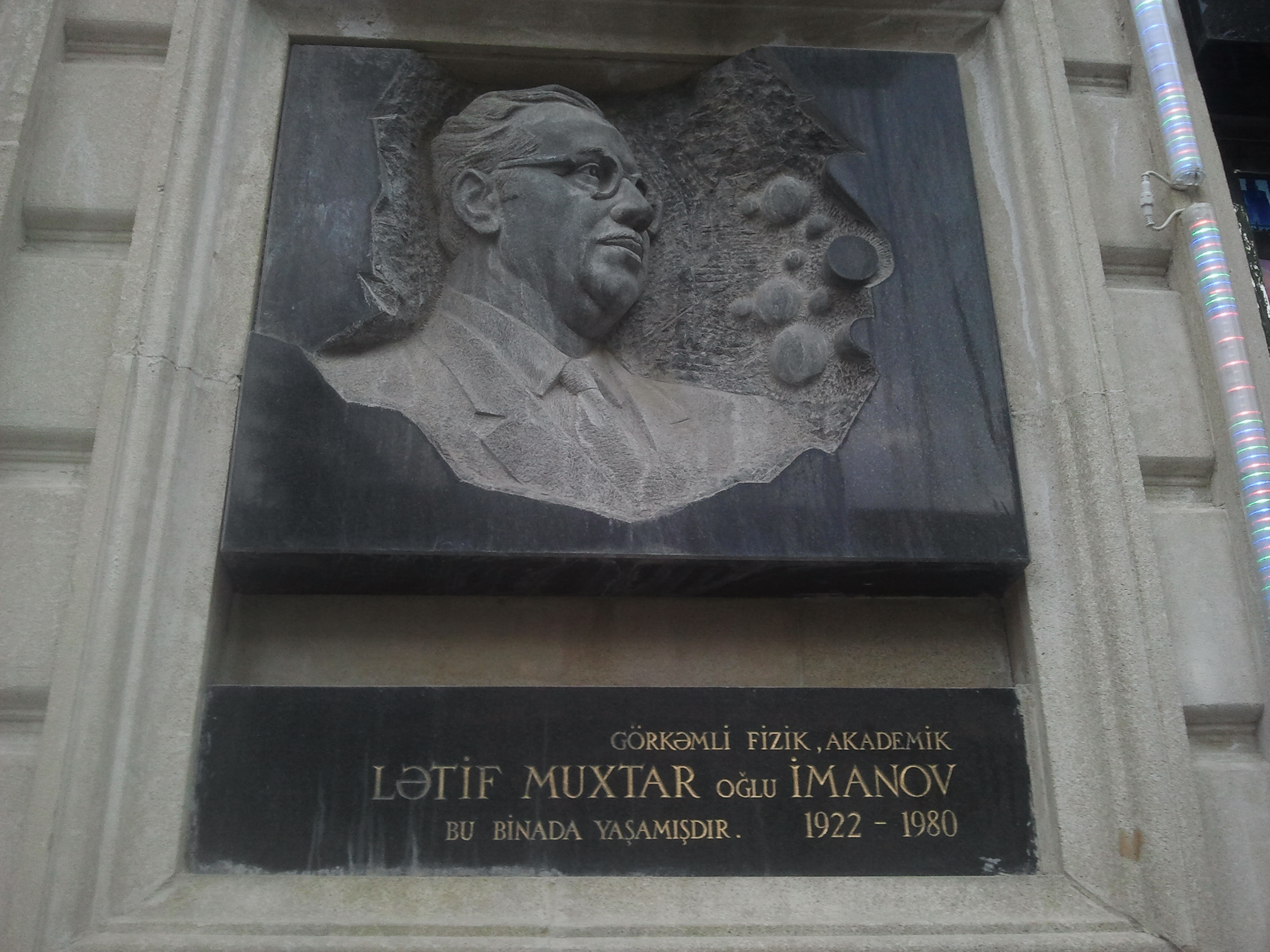
- Memorial plaque of Latif Imanov in Baku
- Born: 15 September 1922; Shusha, Azerbaijan SSR
- Died: 12 March 1980 (aged 57); Baku, Azerbaijan SSR
- Education: ANAS
- Awards: Honored Worker of Science of Azerbaijan
- Scientific career
- Fields: Genetics, Selective breeding
- Workplaces: ANAS, Baku State University

Latif Imanov (15 September 1922, Shusha, Azerbaijan SSR – 12 March 1980, Baku, Azerbaijan SSR, USSR) was an Azerbaijani physicist, full member of the Azerbaijan Academy of Sciences (1976), pedagogue, Honored Scientist of Azerbaijan SSR (1979).

== Life ==
Latif Imanov was born in 1922 in Shusha. He received his secondary education at Shusha City School No. 4. In 1944 he graduated from Azerbaijan State University. From the same year he worked at the Institute of Physics of the Academy of Sciences of the Azerbaijan SSR. And since 1950, simultaneously with work, he taught at the university. Since 1954, Latif Imanov has been the head of the radiophysics and spectroscopy sector. In 1979, Latif Imanov was named after the Honored Worker of Science of Azerbaijan SSR. The scientist died a year later, in 1980.

== Scientific activity ==
Among Imanov's works, a special place was devoted to radio spectroscopy, especially to the study of energy and structural properties of molecules, as well as the processes of molecular movement and interaction in condensed environment. Latif Imanov established the existence of one molecule (H-propanol) in five non-equivalent rotamer states.

In the class of aromatic compounds, Latif Imanov found dielectric criteria for the degree of local ordering. He also determined the presence of rotational isomers, the compatibility of low and high molecular weight components, and the concentration range in which mechanical strengthening of the vitreous system occurs. Latif Imanov also built a model of the dynamic structure of acetic acid and aqueous solutions of amino acids.

== Awards ==
Latif Imanov was awarded the Honored Scientist of Azerbaijan in 1979.
