= Caspar Tobias Zollikofer von Altenklingen =

Swiss pastor and bailiff (1723–1800)

- Born: 13 February 1723; St. Gallen
- Died: 30 January 1800 (aged 76); St. Gallen
- Other names: Caspar Tobias Zollikofer
- Occupations: Pastor, bailiff
- Spouse: Sabina Barbara Bion (m. 1749) Elisabeth Züblin (m. 1758) Sabina Elisabeth Zollikofer (m. 1788)
- Parent(s): Hans Georg Zollikofer (father); Maria Koch (mother)

Caspar Tobias Zollikofer von Altenklingen (13 February 1723 – 30 January 1800) was a Swiss Protestant pastor and bailiff from St. Gallen. He served as Obervogt of Bürglen from 1757 to 1781 and later as a member of the St. Gallen council.

== Biography ==
Zollikofer was the son of Hans Georg Zollikofer, a brewer, and Maria Koch. He probably studied at the theological school in St. Gallen. He married three times: in 1749 Sabina Barbara Bion, daughter of Peter; in 1758 Elisabeth Züblin, daughter of Ambrosius; and in 1788 Sabina Elisabeth Zollikofer, daughter of Georg Leonhard.

== Career ==
Zollikofer became a pastor in 1745 and served as preacher and intendant of Oetlishausen Castle from 1752 to 1757. As Obervogt of Bürglen (1757–1781), he succeeded through fairly strict management in making the seigneury profitable for the city of St. Gallen, to which it belonged. He became a member of the council from 1781, intendant of the hospital in 1784, and president of the Notenstein society in 1789.

== Bibliography ==
- E. Menolfi, Bürglen, 1996, 61, 65.
