= George W. Watt =

American chemist

Dr. George W. Watt (January 8, 1911 – March 29, 1980) was an American chemist who participated in the Manhattan Project.

== Life ==
Watt was born in Bellaire, Ohio on January 8, 1911. He received his degrees at Ohio State University: BA (1931), MS (1933), and PhD (1935). Watt joined the faculty of University of Texas, Austin in 1937, advanced through academic ranks, and served as a professor from 1947 until 1978, when he was given emeritus status. During the years of 1943-45, he was on leave from the university as he worked on the Manhattan Project, as both a group leader and associate section chief on the Plutonium Project.
