= Alva Sibbetts =

Canadian ice hockey player

- Born: December 29, 1900; Forest, Manitoba, Canada
- Died: March 4, 1980 (aged 79); Riverside County, CA, USA
- Position: Defence
- Played for: Edmonton Eskimos
- Playing career: 1919–1928

William Alva Sibbetts (December 29, 1900 – March 4, 1980) was a Canadian professional ice hockey player. He played with the Edmonton Eskimos of the Western Canada Hockey League. Previously, he played circa 1922 with a hockey team based in South Edmonton (Strathcona). In 1923, he was working as a mechanic.

He also played on the Edmonton Outlaws baseball team. He died in 1980 at Riverside County, California.
