= Magari, Estonia =

Village in Estonia

Magari
- Village
- Location in Estonia
- Coordinates: 57°58′18″N 26°50′23″E
- Country: Estonia
- County: Põlva County
- Municipality: Kanepi Parish

Population (2011 Census)
  - Total: 57

Magari is a village in Kanepi Parish, Põlva County in southeastern Estonia. It is located about 4.5 km southeast of Kanepi, the administrative seat of the municipality, surrounded by the villages of Erastvere, Põlgaste, Soodoma, and Lauri. As of the 2011 census, the village's population was 57.

On 9 January 1702 [O.S. 29 December 1701], during the Great Northern War, the Battle of Erastfer took place in Magari. The Russian force, with 18,800 men, defeated a Swedish force of 2,470 men. It was the first significant Russian victory in the Great Northern War.

The Ahja River passes Magari on its northern border with the village of Lauri.
