= Tennosaar =

Family name

Tennosaar is an Estonian surname. Notable people with the surname include:

- Kalmer Tennosaar (1928–2004), Estonian singer and journalist
- Liina Tennosaar (born 1965), Estonian actress
- Sirje Tennosaar (1943–2021), Estonian actress and television presenter
