= August Kasvand =

Estonian mathematician and educator (1890–1980)

- Born: December 30, 1890; Erastvere, Governorate of Livonia, Russian Empire
- Died: March 7, 1980 (aged 89); Tartu, then part of Estonian SSR, Soviet Union
- Education: University of Tartu
- Occupations: Mathematician and educator

August Kasvand (December 30, 1890 – March 7, 1980) was an Estonian mathematician and educator.

== Early life and education ==
Kasvand was born in Erastvere in the Governorate of Livonia, Russian Empire, the son of Gustav Kasvand (1865–1944) and Ann Kasvand (née Luts, 1868–1938). He attended the village school in Kärgula, Võru elementary school, and Võru city school, where he graduated in 1909. In 1910, he passed the professional exam for a primary school teacher and in 1913 the professional exam for a home school teacher in mathematics and geography. From 1919 to 1920, he took in courses for secondary school assistant teachers at the University of Tartu. In 1933, he graduated from the Faculty of Mathematics and Natural Sciences at the University of Tartu.

== Career ==
Kasvand worked as a teacher in Piilsi and Nüpli (1910–1914), and at Nuustaku High School, Võru County Public Education Society High School for Boys, Tartu City Primary School No. 16, Tartu City High School for Girls, and Tartu High School No. 1. From 1944, he worked at Tartu Teacher Training College. After the reorganization of the college into the Tartu Teachers' Institute, he was appointed head of the mathematics-physics and natural science department in 1947. In 1950, Kasvand became the head of the Department of Physics and Mathematics. From 1957 to 1959, he was the teaching practice supervisor of the same school (then called Tartu Pedagogical School). He retired from the school in 1957. From 1959 to 1962, Kasvand taught elementary mathematics and mathematics teaching methodology at the University of Tartu. Kasvand was the author or coauthor of many mathematics textbooks.

== Awards ==
- 1947: Honored Teacher of the Estonian SSR
