= Lake Akste =

Lake in Põlva County, Estonia

- Akste järv (Estonian)
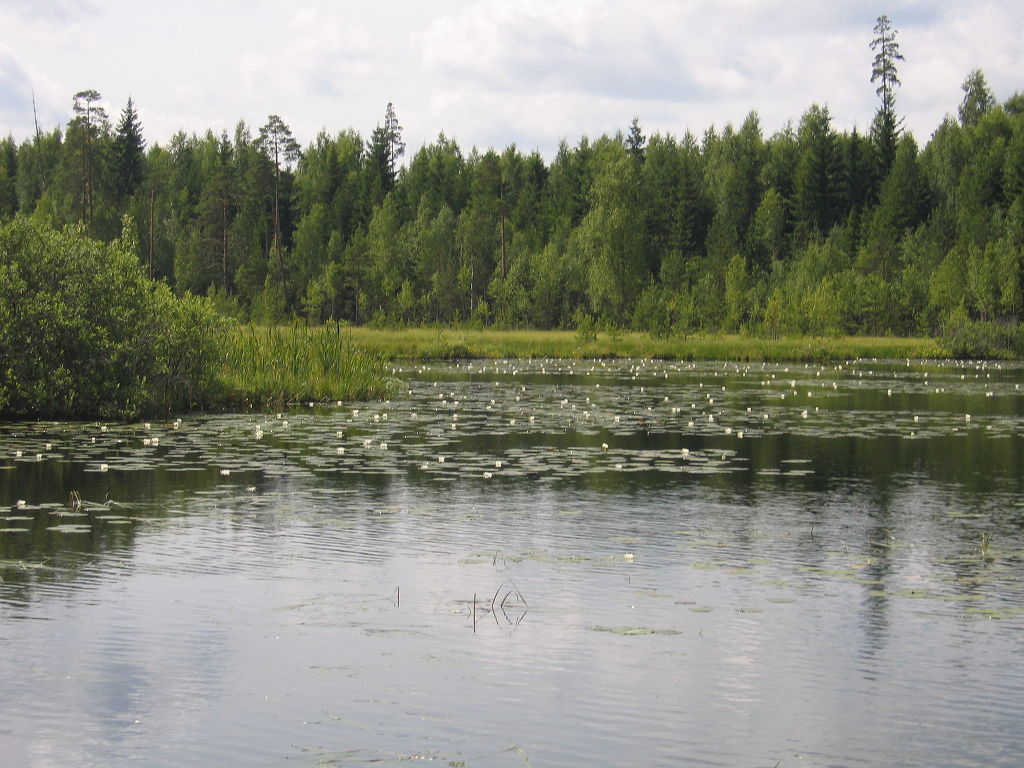

- Location within Estonia
- Location: Põlva Parish, Põlva County, Estonia
- Coordinates: 58°10′08″N 27°03′05″E
- Basin countries: Estonia
- Max. length: 580 meters (1,900 ft)
- Surface area: 5.5 hectares (14 acres)
- Max. depth: 4.3 meters (14 ft)
- Shore length^{1}: 1,440 meters (4,720 ft)
- Surface elevation: 64.3 meters (211 ft)
- ^{1} Shore length is not a well-defined measure.

Lake Akste (Estonian: Akste järv) is a lake in southeastern Estonia. It is located in the village of Kiidjärve in Põlva Parish, Põlva County.

== Physical description ==
The lake has an area of 5.5 hectares (14 acres). The lake has a maximum depth of 4.3 meters (14 ft). It is 580 meters (1,900 ft) long, and its shoreline measures 1,440 meters (4,720 ft).

== See also ==
- List of lakes of Estonia
- Akste (village in Estonia)
