= Kiidjärv =

Lake in Estonia

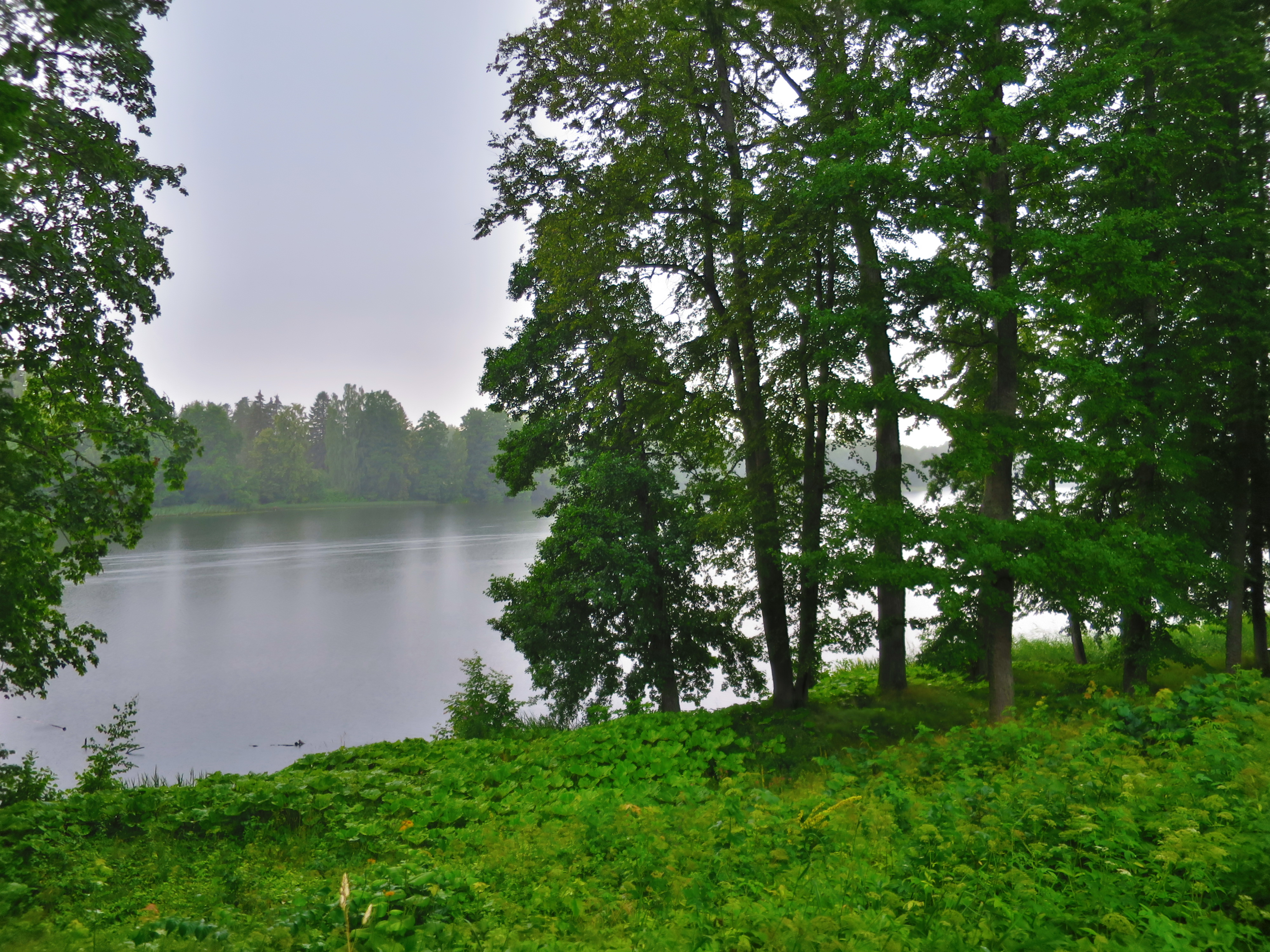

- Location within Estonia
- Location: Põlva Parish, Põlva County, Estonia
- Coordinates: 58°08′15″N 27°00′26″E
- Basin countries: Estonia
- Max. length: 710 meters (2,330 ft)
- Surface area: 13.6 hectares (34 acres)
- Average depth: 42 meters (138 ft)
- Max. depth: 10.0 meters (32.8 ft)
- Shore length^{1}: 1,700 meters (5,600 ft)
- Surface elevation: 58.2 meters (191 ft)
- ^{1} Shore length is not a well-defined measure.

Kiidjärv is a lake in southeastern Estonia. It is located in the village of Kiidjärve in Põlva Parish, Põlva County.

== Physical description ==
The lake has an area of 13.6 hectares (34 acres). The lake has an average depth of 42 meters (138 ft) and a maximum depth of 10.0 meters (32.8 ft). It is 710 meters (2,330 ft) long, and its shoreline measures 1,700 meters (5,600 ft).

== See also ==
- List of lakes of Estonia
