= Erastvere =

Village in Estonia

Erastvere Erästvere (in Võro)
- Village
- Location in Estonia
- Coordinates: 57°58′57″N 26°47′25″E
- Country: Estonia
- County: Põlva County
- Municipality: Kanepi Parish
- First mentioned: 1452

Population (2011 Census)
  - Total: 286

Erastvere (German: Errestfer, Võro: Erästvere) is a village in Kanepi Parish, Põlva County in southeastern Estonia. It is located just southeast of Kanepi, the centre of the municipality, and is passed by the Tallinn–Tartu–Võru–Luhamaa road (E263). As of the 2011 census, the village's population was 286.

The village centre is next to 16.3 ha Lake Erastvere, which is the source of the Ahja River. The Võhandu River also passes Erastvere on its western side. Erastvere is the site of the former Erastvere (Errestfer) knight manor. The main building has not survived, and a newer nursery home building is located on the site.

== History ==
On 9 January 1702 [O.S. 29 December 1701], during the Great Northern War, the Battle of Erastfer took place about 3 km southeast of Erastvere in nowadays Magari village. The Russian troops with 18,800 men were victorious over a Swedish force of 2,470 men. It was the first significant Russian victory in the Great Northern War.

On 1 March 2021 the village of Soodoma was dissolved and its territory was merged into Erastvere.

== Notable people ==
Notable people who were born or lived in Erastvere include the following:

- August Kasvand (1890–1980), mathematician and educator

== Gallery ==
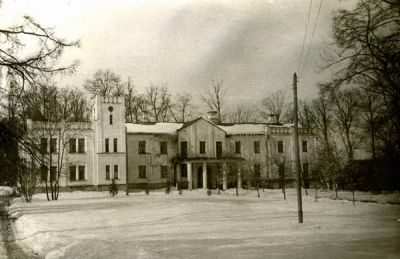
Main building of Erastvere Manor

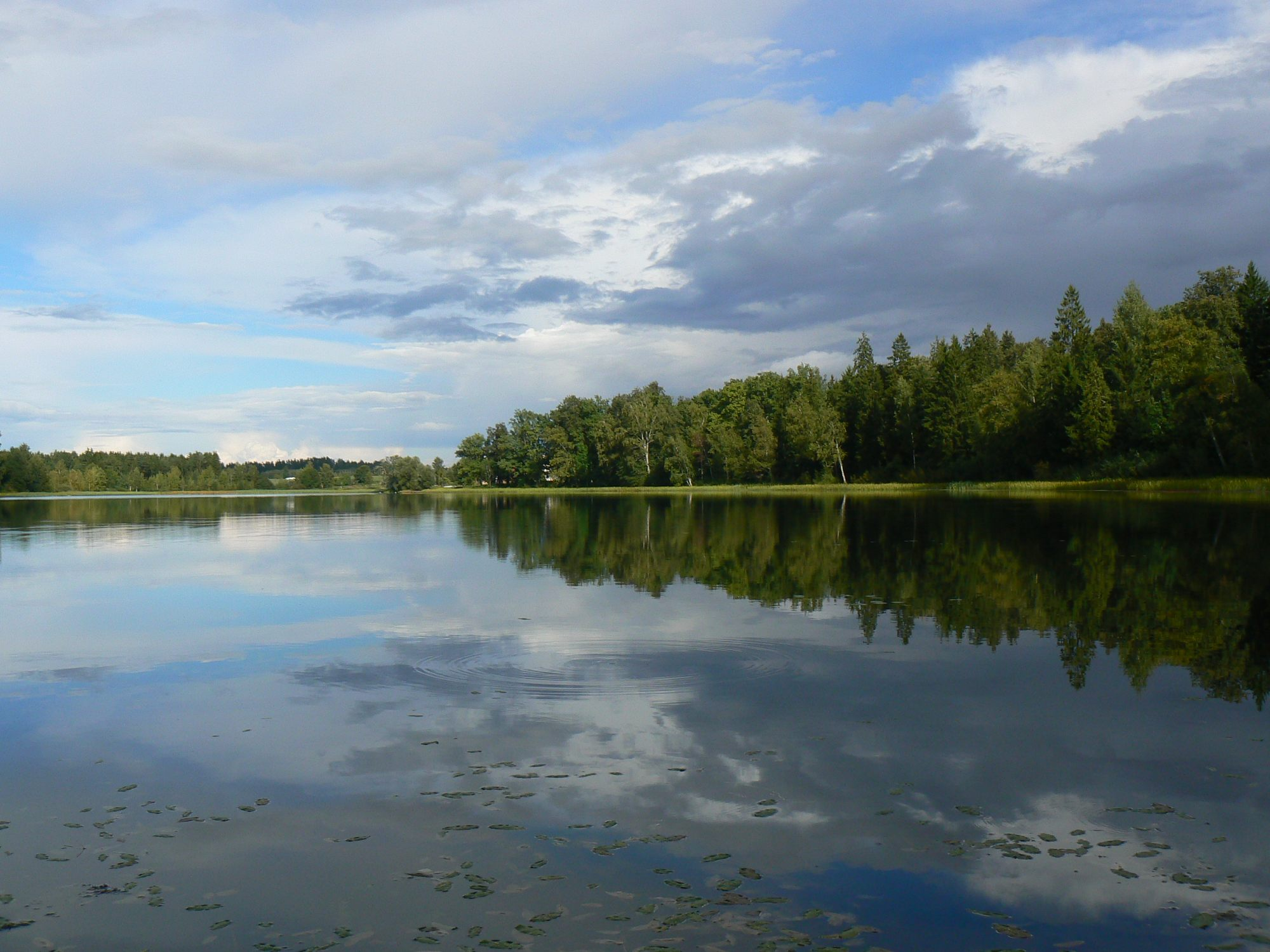
Lake Erastvere

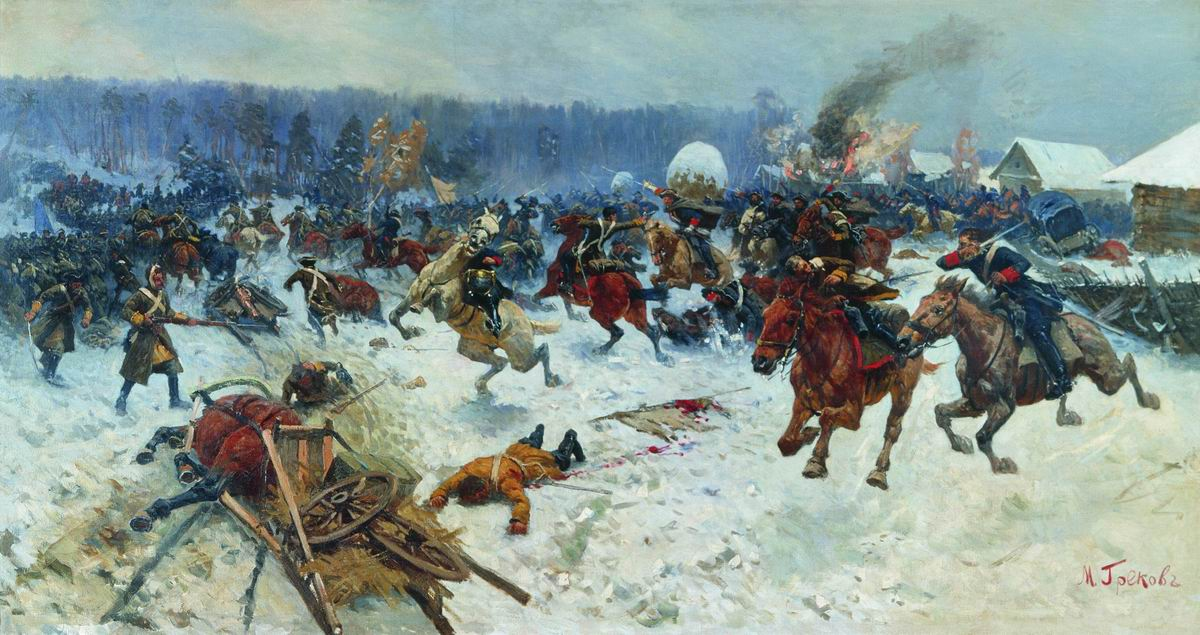
The Battle of Erastfer, painted by Mitrofan Grekov in 1914.
