= Orajõgi =

River in Estonia

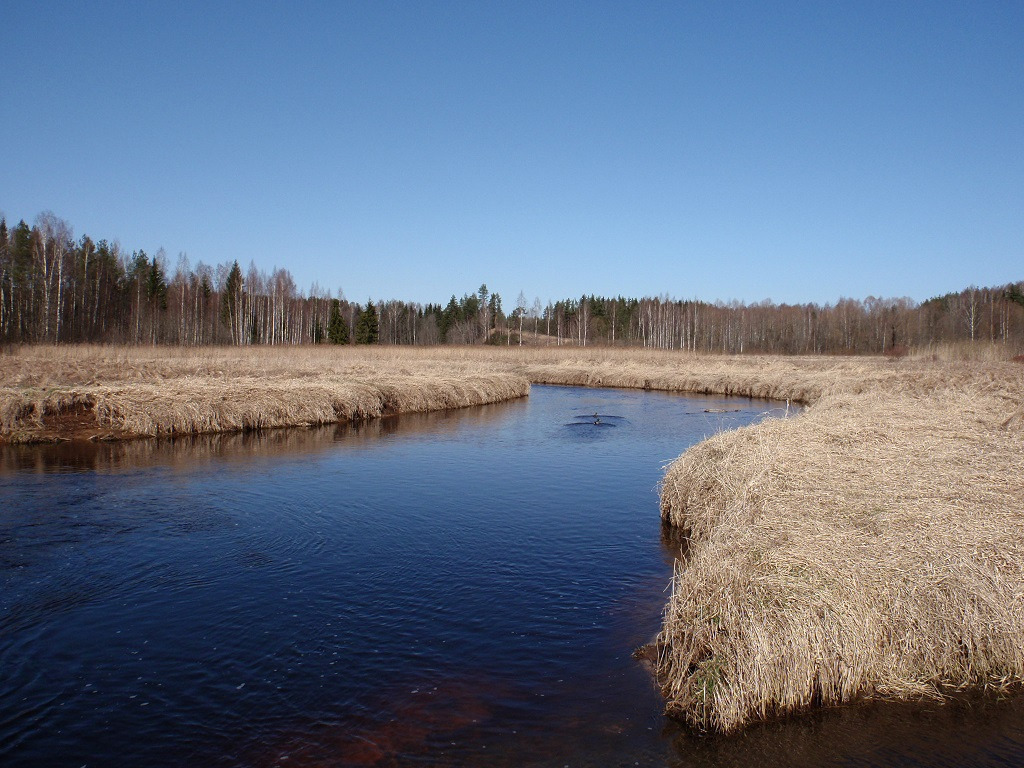

Location
- Country: Estonia

Physical characteristics
- Mouth: Ahja River
  - coordinates: 58°06′23″N 27°04′56″E
- Length: 48 km
- Basin size: 181.1 km^{2}

The Orajõgi is a river in Põlva County, Estonia. The river is 48 km long, and its basin size is 181.1 km^{2}. It discharges into the Ahja River.
