= Taevaskoja =

Village in Estonia

Coordinates: 58°06′N 27°02′E

- Village
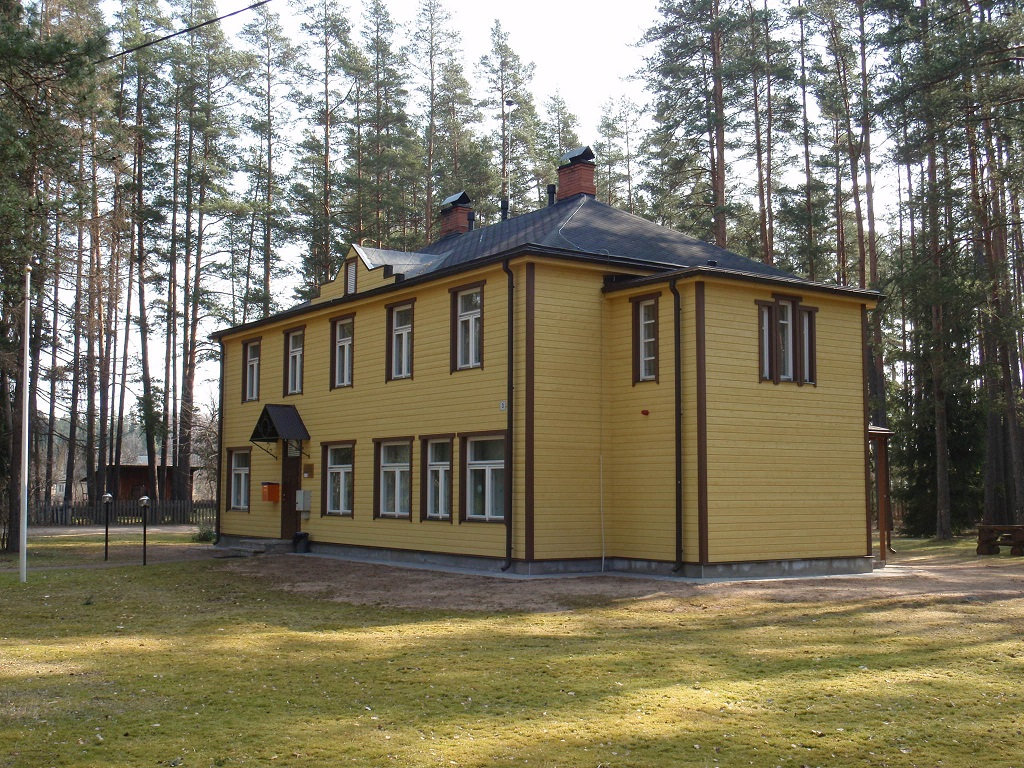
- Taevaskoja library
- Interactive map of Taevaskoja
- Country: Estonia
- County: Põlva County
- Parish: Põlva Parish

Population (2011)
  - Total: 114
- Time zone: UTC+2 (EET)
  - Summer (DST): UTC+3 (EEST)

Taevaskoja (Võro: Taivaskua) is a village in Põlva Parish, Põlva County in southeastern Estonia, known for its outcrops of Devonian sandstone on the banks of Ahja river.

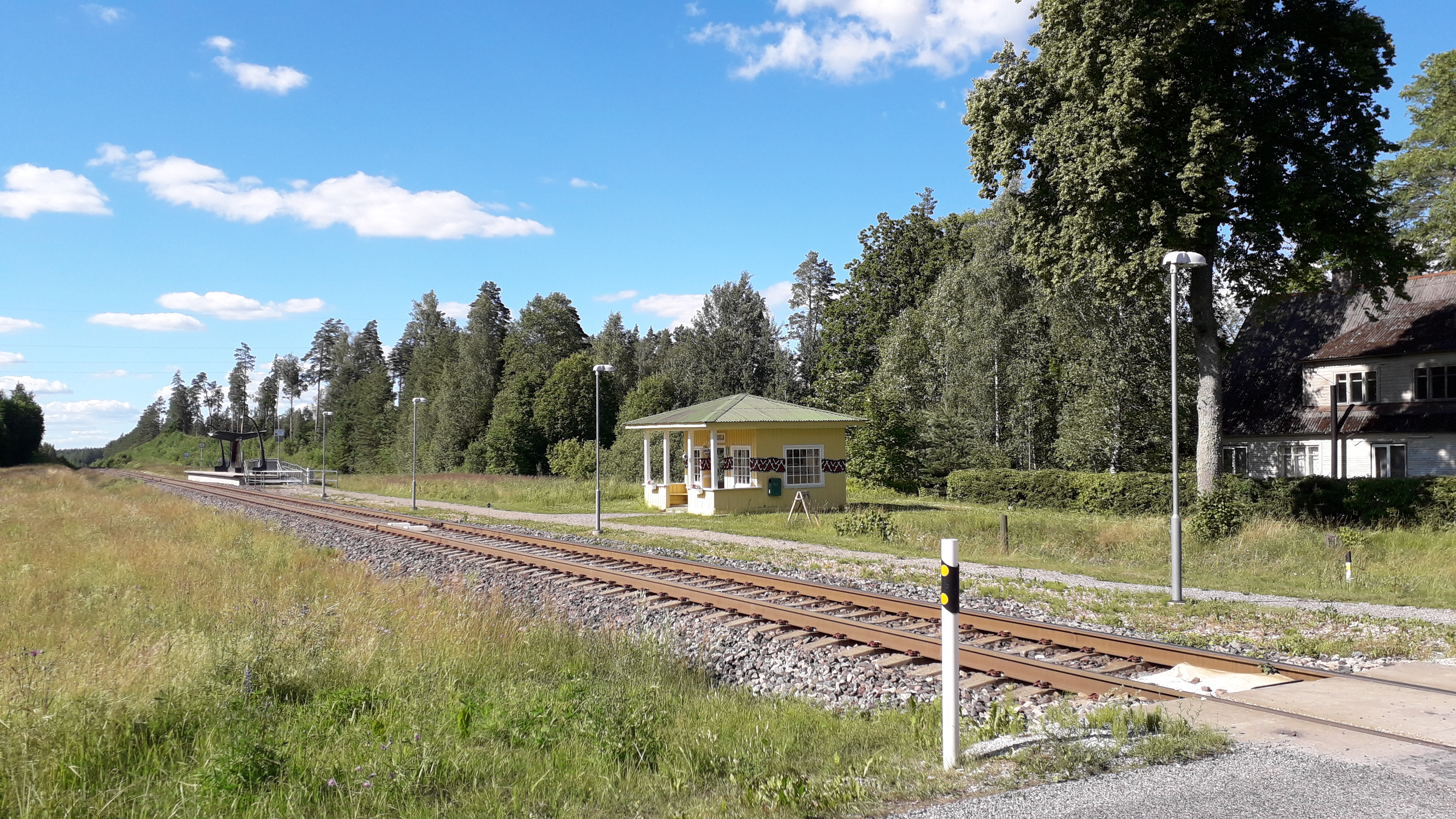
Railway stop near Taevaskoja village

Preceding station	Elron	Following station
Kiidjärve towards Tallinn	Tallinn–Tartu–Koidula	Põlva towards Koidula
