= Lake Nüpli =

Lake in Estonia

- Nüpli järv (Estonian)
- Location within Estonia
- Coordinates: 58°02′02″N 26°29′53″E
- Basin countries: Estonia
- Max. length: 860 meters (2,820 ft)
- Surface area: 28.9 hectares (71 acres)
- Average depth: 4.0 meters (13.1 ft)
- Max. depth: 6.0 meters (19.7 ft)
- Water volume: 1,077,000 cubic meters (38,000,000 cu ft)
- Shore length^{1}: 2,580 meters (8,460 ft)
- Surface elevation: 125.2 meters (411 ft)
- ^{1} Shore length is not a well-defined measure.

Lake Nüpli (Estonian: Nüpli järv) is a lake in Estonia. It is located in the village of Nüpli in Otepää Parish, Valga County.

== Physical description ==
The lake has an area of 28.9 hectares (71 acres). The lake has an average depth of 4.0 meters (13.1 ft) and a maximum depth of 6.0 meters (19.7 ft). It is 860 meters (2,820 ft) long, and its shoreline measures 2,580 meters (8,460 ft). It has a volume of 1,077,000 cubic meters (38,000,000 cu ft).

== See also ==
- List of lakes of Estonia
