= Ene Järvis =

Estonian actress (1947–2025)

- Born: 26 October 1947; Kiidjärve, then part of Estonian SSR, Soviet Union
- Died: 24 June 2025 (aged 77)
- Other name: Ene Janson
- Occupation: Actress
- Years active: 1970 – 2018
- Spouse: Vello Janson (m. 1976; div. 1984)

Ene Järvis (26 October 1947 – 24 June 2025) was an Estonian stage, film, radio and television actress.

== Early life and education ==
Ene Järvis was born in Kiidjärve, Põlva County to parents Paul and Amanda Elfriede Järvis. She was the second to youngest of five siblings; two older sisters and an older brother named Eimar almost fourteen years her senior, and a younger sister. She attended schools in Põlva, graduating from Põlva Secondary School in 1966 (now, Põlva Gymnasium). Following graduation, she enrolled at the Tallinn State Conservatory in Tallinn (now, the Estonian Academy of Music and Theatre), graduating from the institution's performing arts department in 1970. During her studies at the Tallinn State Conservatory, she met and befriended classmate Helene Vannari. The two would become lifelong friends.

== Career ==
=== Stage ===
In 1970, Järvis began an engagement at the National Youth Theatre in Tallinn (now, the Tallinn City Theatre). She would remain an actress at the theatre for nearly forty years, leaving in 2009. Beginning in 2009, she was a freelance actress.

=== Film ===
Järvis' first substantial feature-length film role was in the 1987 Soviet-Estonian Helle Karis-directed Metsluiged, adapted from the 1838 Hans Christian Andersen literary fairy tale The Wild Swans, for Tallinnfilm. This was followed in 1990 by a small role in the Kaljo Kiisk directed drama Regina; and an uncredited role as Agnes in the 1992 Mati Põldre directed Need vanad armastuskirjad, a biopic of 1930s and 1940s Estonian songwriter Raimond Valgre. In 1999, she appeared as a director in the Valentin Kuik directed drama Lurjus, which was adapted from the short story Poldlets (also known as An Affair of Honor) penned by Vladimir Nabokov.

In 2011, Ene Järvis appeared as Riina in the Rain Tolk and Andres Maimik directed comedy Kormoranid ehk Nahkpükse ei pesta for Kuukulgur Film, about a 1970s rock band trying to make a comeback. In 2012, she had a starring role as Reeda in the Ain Mäeots directed drama Deemonid, which chronicles the downward spiral of three individuals who enter a casino. In 2013, she had a small role as a gynecologist in the Ilmar Raag romantic drama Kertu. In 2016, she appeared in both the René Vilbre directed comedy Klassikokkutulek, and the Anu Aun directed romantic drama Polaarpoiss.

Throughout her career, Järvis also appeared in a number of film shorts.

=== Television and radio ===
One of Järvis's most well-known television roles was the character Karu-Kati in the children's show Mõmmi ja aabits which was broadcast on Eesti Televisioon (ETV) from 1976 until 1977.

In 1989, Ene Järvis was cast in the role of Astrid Olsen for the Mikk Mikiver directed television film Doktor Stockmann, based on the 1886 play An Enemy of the People by Norwegian playwright Henrik Ibsen. Between 1995 and 1996, she played the role of Lilian Põder on the popular, long-running Eesti Televisioon (ETV) drama serial Õnne 13.

Järvis also made appearances in 2007 on the Kanal 2 television crime series Kelgukoerad, and as Helga in the Kanal 2 mystery-horror television series Süvahavva. Between 2011 and 2015, she also made several appearances on episodes of the TV3 comedy-crime series Kättemaksukontor.

During her career Järvis also performed in a number of radio theatre plays. Some of her more memorable roles in radio theatre were in productions of works by Vladimir Mayakovsky, August Gailit, and Oscar Wilde.

== Personal life and death ==
Ene Järvis was married to actor Vello Janson from 1976 until their divorce in 1984. The couple had no children. Järvis lived in Tallinn and was in a relationship with long-term partner Gunnar. She died on 24 June 2025, at the age of 77.
