= Ahja River Valley Landscape Conservation Area =

Protected area in Estonia

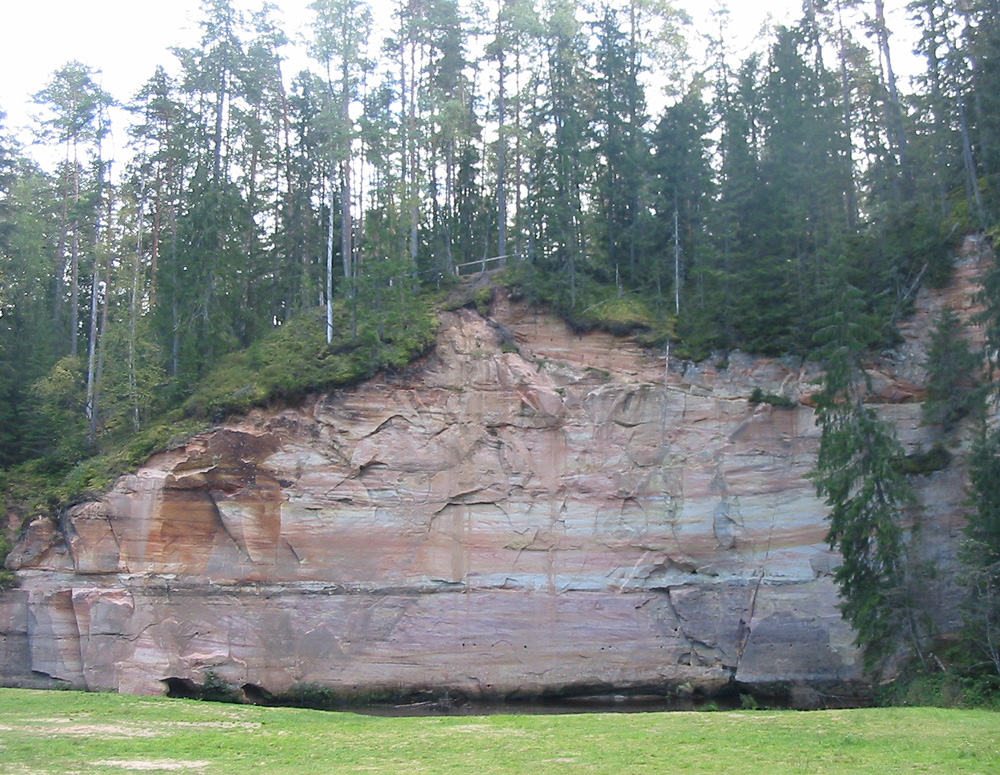

- Location within Estonia
- Location: Estonia
- Coordinates: 58°07′N 27°03′E
- Area: 11,150 ha (27,600 acres)
- Established: 1957 (2014)

Ahja River Valley Landscape Conservation Area is a nature park situated in Põlva County, Estonia.

Its area is 11150 ha.

The protected area was designated in 1957 to protect the central course of Ahja River and its surrounding areas. In 2014, the protected area was redesigned to the landscape conservation area.
