= Lääniste =

Village in Estonia

- village
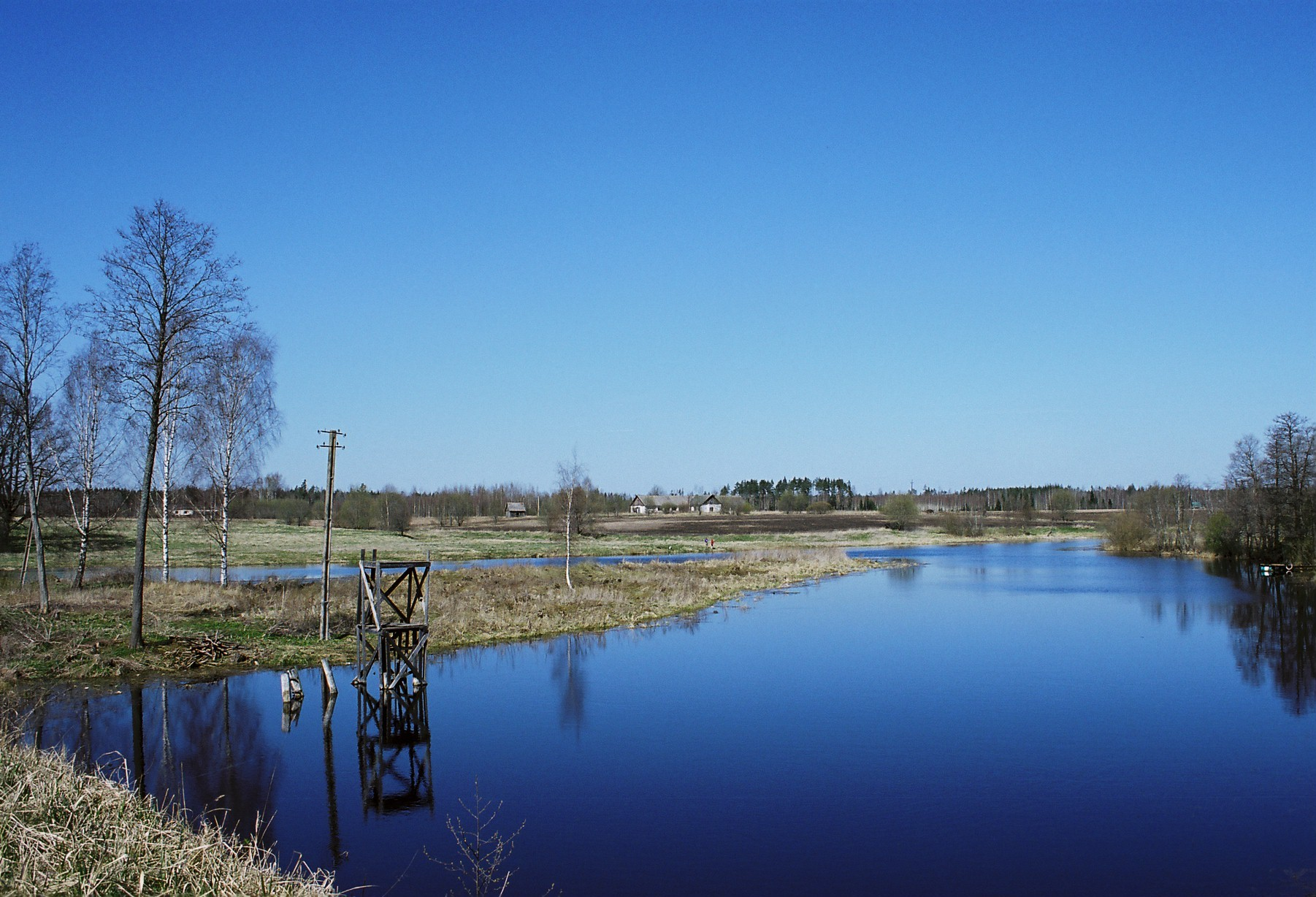
- The Ahja River in Lääniste

- Location in Estonia
- Coordinates: 58°16′11″N 27°07′38″E
- Country: Estonia
- County: Tartu County
- Municipality: Kastre Parish

Population (01.01.2000)
  - Total: 134
- Website: www.hot.ee/l/laaniste1

Lääniste is a village in Kastre Parish, Tartu County, Estonia. It is located just southeast of Võnnu, by the Ahja River. The city of Tartu is located about 27 km (17 mi) northwest. In 2000 Lääniste had a population of 134.
