= Soodoma =

Village in Estonia

- Village
- Location in Estonia
- Coordinates: 57°57′06″N 26°50′11″E
- Country: Estonia
- County: Põlva County
- Municipality: Kanepi Parish

Population (2011 Census)
  - Total: 150

Soodoma was a village in Kanepi Parish, Põlva County in southeastern Estonia. It was located about 4.5 km southeast of Kanepi, the administrative centre of the municipality, by the Tallinn–Tartu–Võru–Luhamaa road (E263), just next to Erastvere. As of the 2011 census, the village's population was 150. On 1 March 2021 Soodoma was dissolved and its territory was merged into Erastvere.

The village was specially known for its odd name, referring to the infamous biblical city of Sodom. It gained the name from a farmstead that was named by the local landlord from Erastvere Manor.
