= Sirje Tennosaar =

Estonian actress and television presenter (1943–2021)

- Born: Sirje Arbi; 5 June 1943; Tartu, then part of Generalbezirk Estland
- Died: 23 April 2021 (aged 77)
- Occupations: actress and television presenter
- Spouse: Kalmer Tennosaar (m. 1964; div. 1978)
- Children: 2, including Liina

Sirje Tennosaar (née Sirje Arbi; 5 June 1943 – 23 April 2021) was an Estonian actress and television presenter. She had major roles in the films Jääminek (1962) and Jäljed and in the television production Maailm minuta (1974) and in the television series Kelgukoerad (2009).

Tennosaar was a member of the Endla Theatre in 1963, before moving to the Estonian Drama Theatre in 1966. She then became a television presenter at Eesti Televisioon (ETV) from 1971 until 1991. Then she moved to Kanal 2 from 1993 to 2000.

Tennosaar was married to singer and journalist Kalmer Tennosaar from 1964 until 1978. Her daughter is actress Liina Tennosaar. She died on 23 April 2021, aged 77.
