= Liina Tennosaar =

Estonian actress (born 1965)

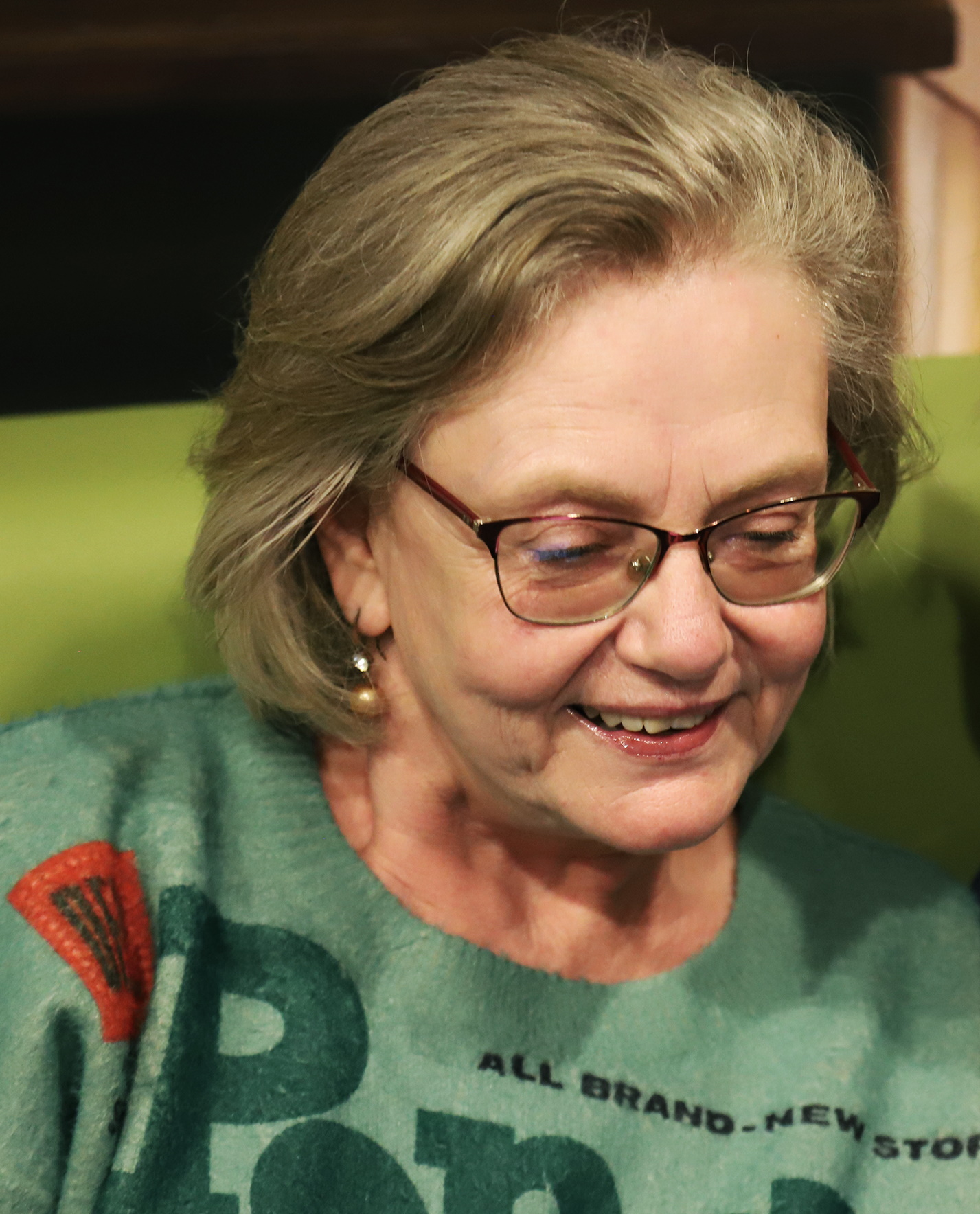
- Tennosaar in 2024
- Born: 23 May 1965 (age 61); Tallinn, then part of Estonian SSR, Soviet Union
- Occupation: Actress
- Years active: 1986–present
- Spouse(s): Heino Seljamaa (divorced); Sten Zupping (divorced)
- Partner: Egon Nuter
- Children: 2, including Jass Seljamaa
- Parent(s): Kalmer Tennosaar (father); Sirje Tennosaar (mother)

Liina Tennosaar (born 23 May 1965) is an Estonian stage, film and television actress.

== Early life and education ==
Liina Tennosaar was born in Tallinn to Kalmer Tennosaar and Sirje Tennosaar (née Arbi). She has one full sibling and one half-sibling, from her father's second marriage. Her father was a popular Estonian journalist, singer and television personality who is possibly best recalled as "Uncle Kalmer" (Estonian: onu Kalmer), the host of the ETV children's television series Entel-Tentel. Her mother was a stage, film and television actress.

She attended primary and secondary schools in Tallinn, graduating in 1982, before studying acting at the Tallinn State Conservatory, Performing Arts Department (now, the Estonian Academy of Music and Theatre), graduating in 1986.

== Stage career ==
Following graduation, Liina Tennosaar began a two year engagement at the Vanemuine theatre in Tartu, ending in 1988. From 1998 until 1993, she was engaged as an actress at the Endla Theatre in Pärnu, and from 1996 until 2001, she was engaged at the Vanalinnastuudio in Tallinn. Since 2001, she has been a freelance actor. She has appeared in productions in many other theatres throughout Estonia, including the Ugala theatre, the Tallinna Kammerteater, the Vannalinnastudio, and others.

In 1993, she received the Ants Lauter Award for her portrayal of the character Josie Hogan in a Priit Pedajas staged production of Eugene O'Neill's A Moon for the Misbegotten (Estonian translated title: Saatuse heidikute kuu) at the Endla Theatre.

== Television ==
Liina Tennosaar made her television debut at age 22 as Mari in the Ago-Endrik Kerge directed 1983 Soviet-Estonian comedy television feature-length film Püha Susanna ehk meistrite kool. This was followed by the role of Aili Tõru in the 1986 Ago-Endrik Kerge directed television drama film Võtmeküsimus and the role of Mari in the 1987 Peeter Simm directed historical dramatic television film Tants aurukatla ümber, based on the novel of the same name by Estonian author Mats Traat. In 2004, she appeared in the feature-length television film Taksirengit, directed by Jussi Niilekselä and based on a play by Mihkel Ulman.

From 1997 until 1999, she played the character of Tiiu on the popular, long-running ETV television drama Õnne 13. She has made appearances on such Estonian television series as Urpo & Turpo, Ohtlik lend, Ühikarotid, Kelgukoerad, Kättemaksukontor, Elu keset linna and Viimane võmm. In 2017, she appeared as Inga in the TV3 mystery-drama series Merivälja.

== Film ==
Tennosaar made her feature film debut in 1990 in a starring role as Juuli in the Arvo Kruusement directed Sügis for Tallinnfilm. The film was based on the Oskar Luts novel of the same name and the final part of a trilogy of both the novels and films made based on them. This was followed by a small role in the 1993 Pekka Karjalainen directed comedy Hysteria; a joint Finnish-Estonian production.

In 2007, she appeared in a small role in the Veiko Õunpuu directed drama Sügisball; adapted from author Mati Unt's 1979 novel of the same name. That same year she appeared as Viire in the Andres Maimik and Rain Tolk directed road movie comedy Jan Uuspõld läheb Tartusse; a film that portrays Estonian actor Jan Uuspõld as a down-on-his-luck caricature of himself trying to hitchhike from Tallinn to Tartu to perform in a role at the Vanemuine theatre. This was followed by a role in the 2008 Ain Mäeots directed drama Taarka, in which she plays the main character's mother. The film was based on the play of the same name by Võro poet and author Kauksi Ülle. Other notable roles in films include Toomas' mother in the Hannu Salonen directed drama-thriller Vasha in 2009; Riina, in the Ain Mäeots directed drama Deemonid in 2012, and in the Andrejs Ekis and Tanel Ingi directed 2020 comedy Asjad, millest me ei räägi. Tennosaar has also appeared in number of film shorts and student films.

== Personal life ==
Liina Tennosaar has been married twice; her first marriage was to actor, puppeteer and singer Heino Seljamaa from 1984 until their divorce in 1993. The couple has a son, Jass Seljamaa, born in 1985, who has also become an actor. Her second marriage was to actor Sten Zupping, with whom she has a daughter, Epp. Tennosaar and Zupping divorced in 2008. She has been in a relationship with theater and film actor and theater director Egon Nuter since 2008.
