= Nüpli =

Village in Estonia

- Village
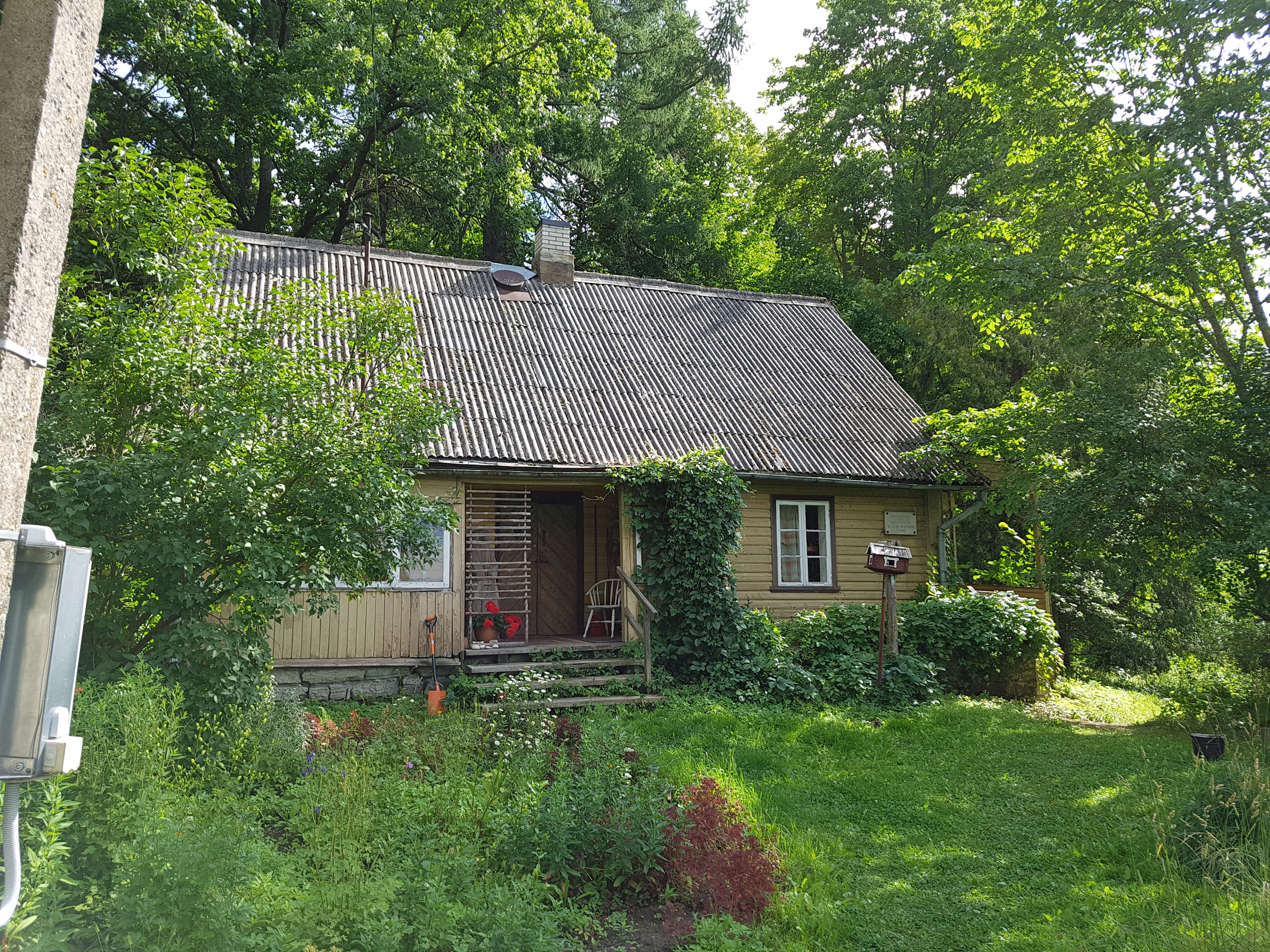
- The Gustav Wulff-Õie Museum in Nüpli

- Location in Estonia
- Coordinates: 58°02′06″N 26°29′22″E
- Country: Estonia
- County: Valga County
- Municipality: Otepää Parish

Population (07.02.2008)
  - Total: 128

Nüpli (German: Knippelshof) is a village in Otepää Parish, Valga County in southeastern Estonia. It has a population of 128 (as of 7 February 2008).

== See also ==
- Lake Nüpli
