= Kalmer Tennosaar =

Estonian singer and journalist (1928–2004)

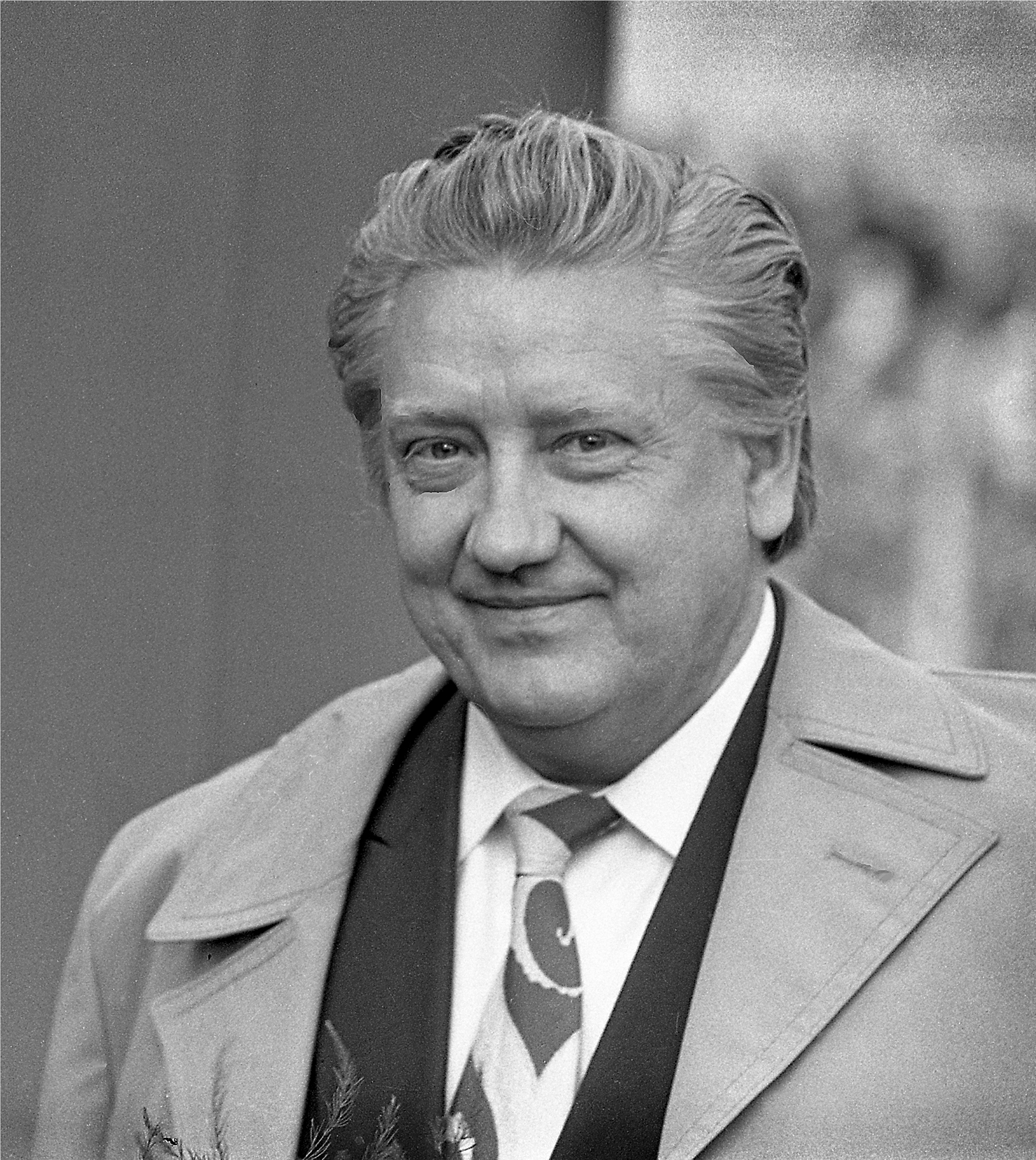
Tennosaar in 1974

Kalmer Tennosaar (23 November 1928, Kiidjärve, Vastse-Kuuste Parish – 20 September 2004, Tallinn) was an Estonian singer and Eesti Televisioon journalist.

He was popular in Soviet times as a soloist with the Popular Music Orchestra of the Estonian Radio and Television.

Kalmer Tennosaar began as a presenter at ETV on 1 January 1956, and subsequently worked as an editor and fellow of music programmes (1957–1962, and then after 1968). He became very popular as the host of a children's songs show "Entel-tentel". Tennosaar later continued his career as a singer.

Tennosaar was married to actress Sirje Arbi from 1964 until 1978. The couple had two daughters, including actress Liina Tennosaar.
