= Lake Erastvere =

Lake in Estonia

- Erastvere järv (Estonian)
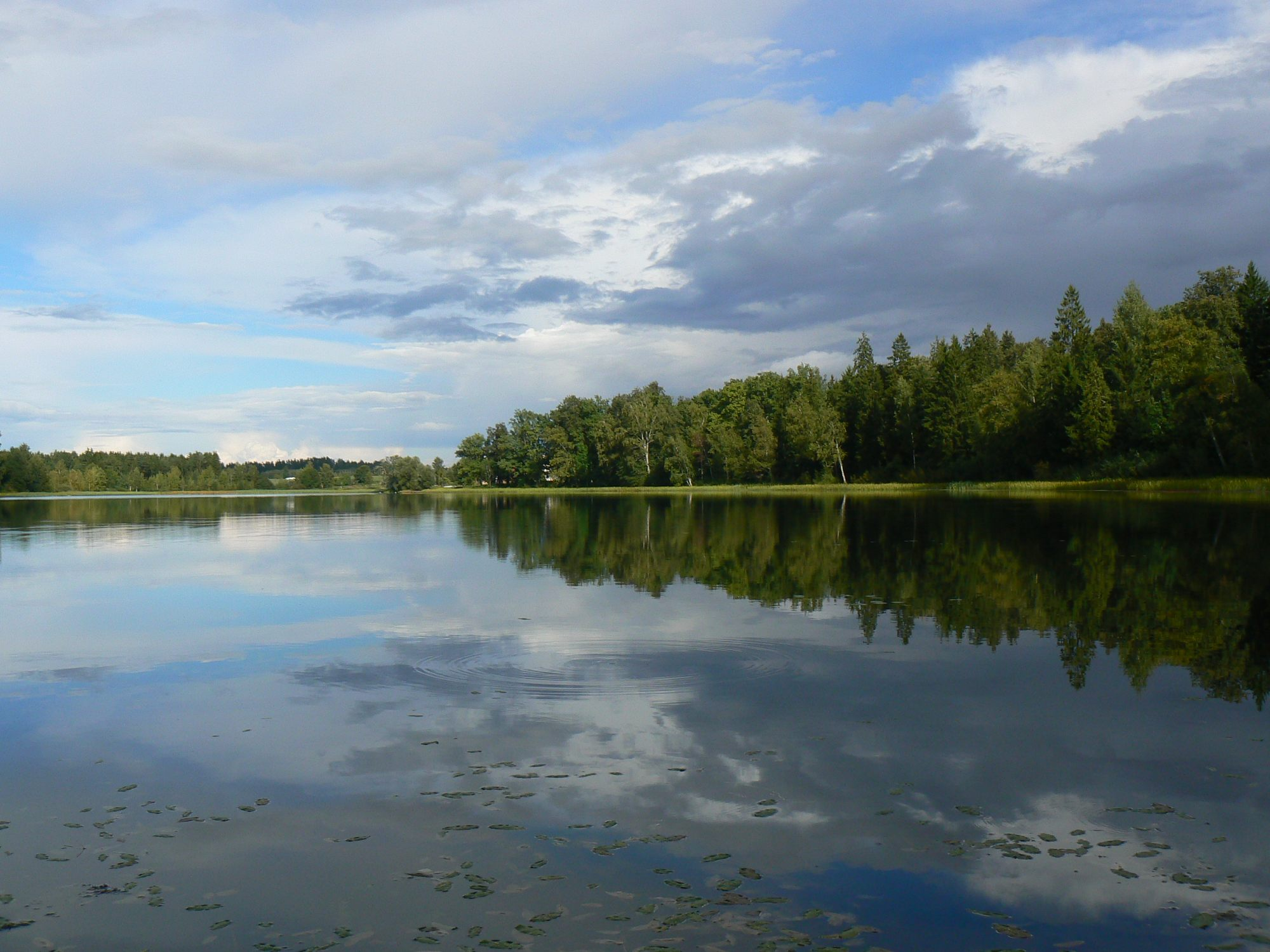

- Location within Estonia
- Location: Põlva County, Estonia
- Coordinates: 57°58′45″N 26°47′0″E
- Basin countries: Estonia
- Max. length: 810 meters (2,660 ft)
- Surface area: 15.8 hectares (39 acres)
- Average depth: 3.5 meters (11 ft)
- Max. depth: 9.7 meters (32 ft)
- Shore length^{1}: 1,890 meters (6,200 ft)
- Surface elevation: 116.3 meters (382 ft)
- ^{1} Shore length is not a well-defined measure.

Lake Erastvere (Estonian: Erastvere järv) is a lake in Estonia. It is located in the village of Erastvere in Kanepi Parish, Põlva County.

== Physical description ==
The lake has an area of 15.8 hectares (39 acres). The lake has an average depth of 3.5 meters (11 ft) and a maximum depth of 9.7 meters (32 ft). It is 810 meters (2,660 ft) long, and its shoreline measures 1,890 meters (6,200 ft).

== See also ==
- List of lakes of Estonia
