= Lauri, Põlva County =

Village in Estonia

Coordinates: 57°59′19″N 26°51′28″E

Lauri
- Village
- Interactive map of Lauri
- Country: Estonia
- County: Põlva County
- Parish: Kanepi Parish
- Time zone: UTC+2 (EET)
  - Summer (DST): UTC+3 (EEST)

Lauri is a village in Kanepi Parish, Põlva County in southeastern Estonia.
