= Ahja (river) =

River in Estonia

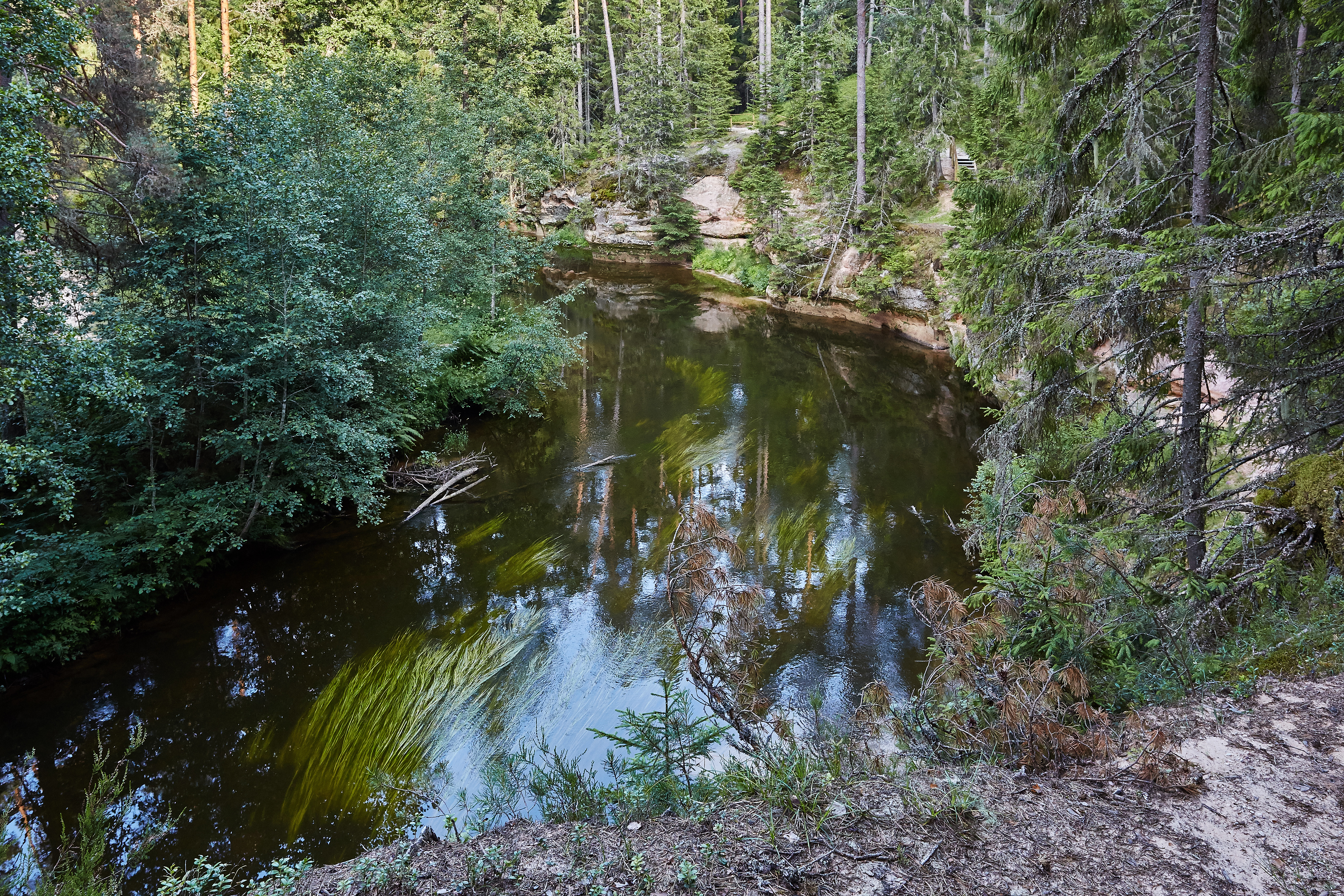
- The Ahja River

- Location of mouth

Location
- Country: Estonia

Physical characteristics
- Source
  - location: Lake Erastvere
  - elevation: 87 m (285 ft)
- Mouth: Emajõgi
  - coordinates: 58°23′6″N 27°9′27″E
- Length: 103.4 km (64.2 mi)
- Basin size: 1,074.3 km^{2} (414.8 sq mi)

Basin features
- Progression: Emajõgi→ Lake Peipus→ Narva→ Gulf of Finland

The Ahja (Estonian: Ahja jõgi) is a river in Estonia. The river is 103.4 kilometres (64.2 mi) long.

The river begins at Lake Erastvere and empties into the Emajõgi River. The river's middle course is protected by the Ahja River Valley Landscape Conservation Area.

== Gallery ==
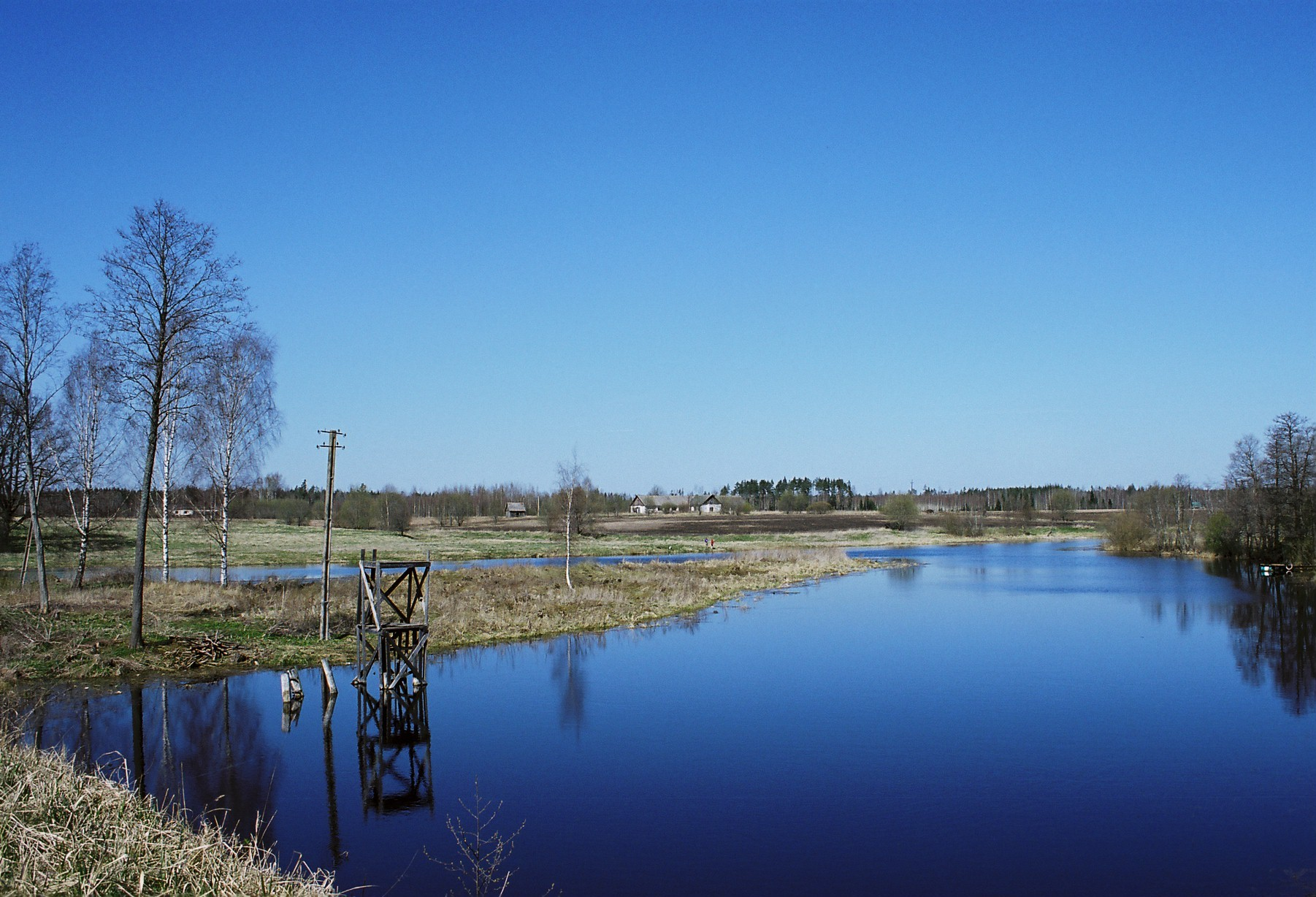
The Ahja in Lääniste in 2008

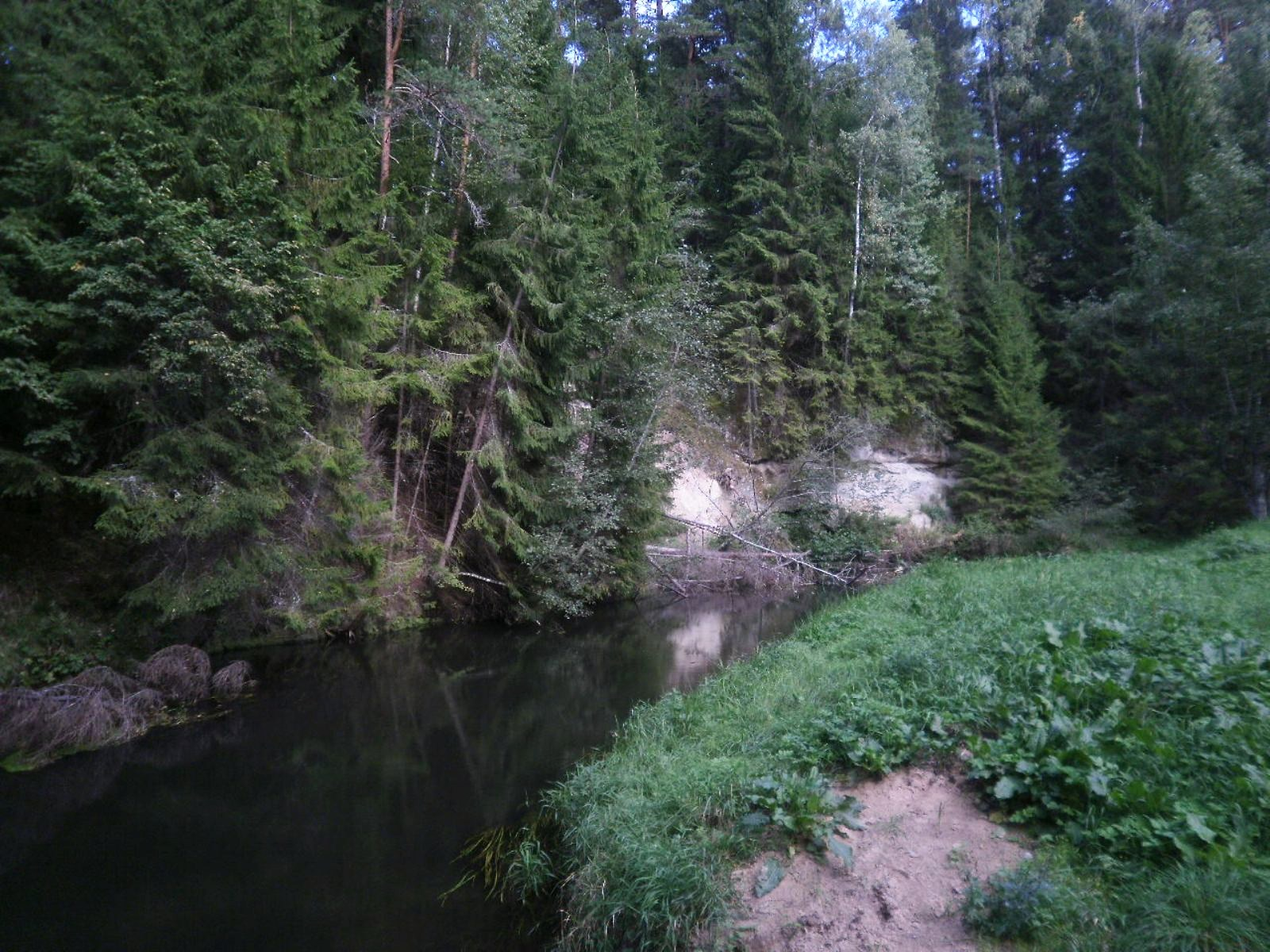
The Ahja near Valgemetsa

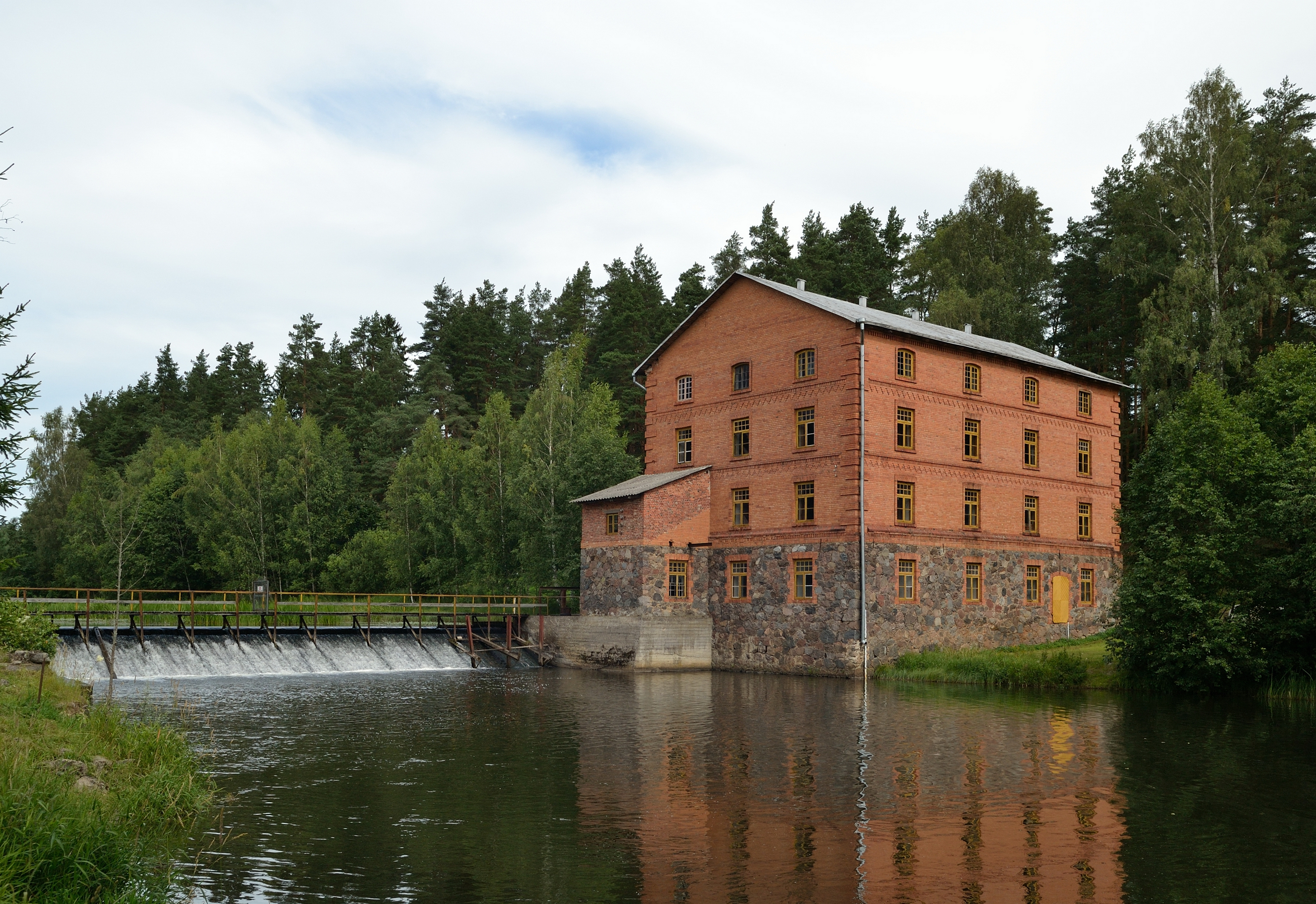
Kiidjärve watermill, built in 1914

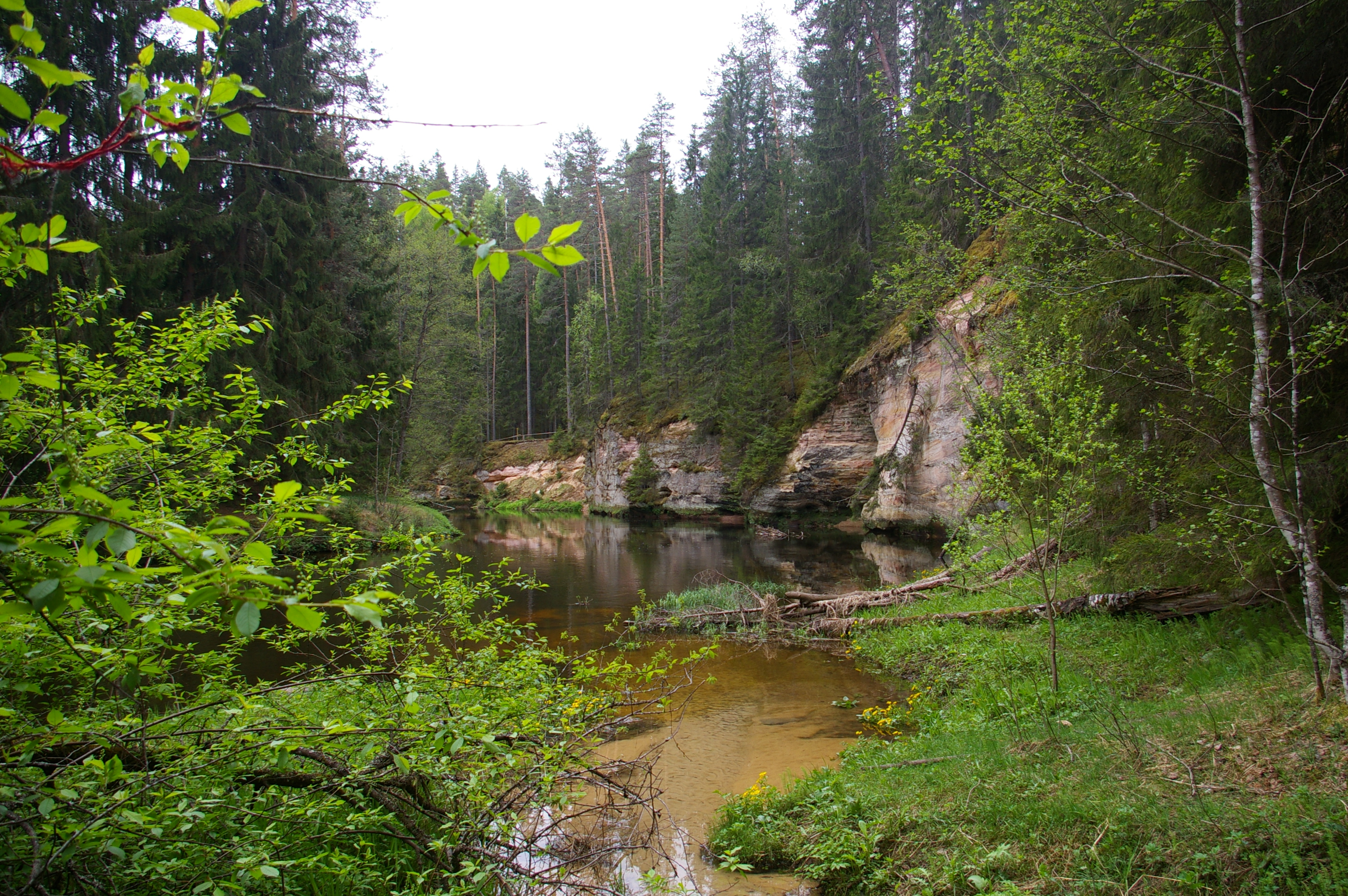
Taevaskoja

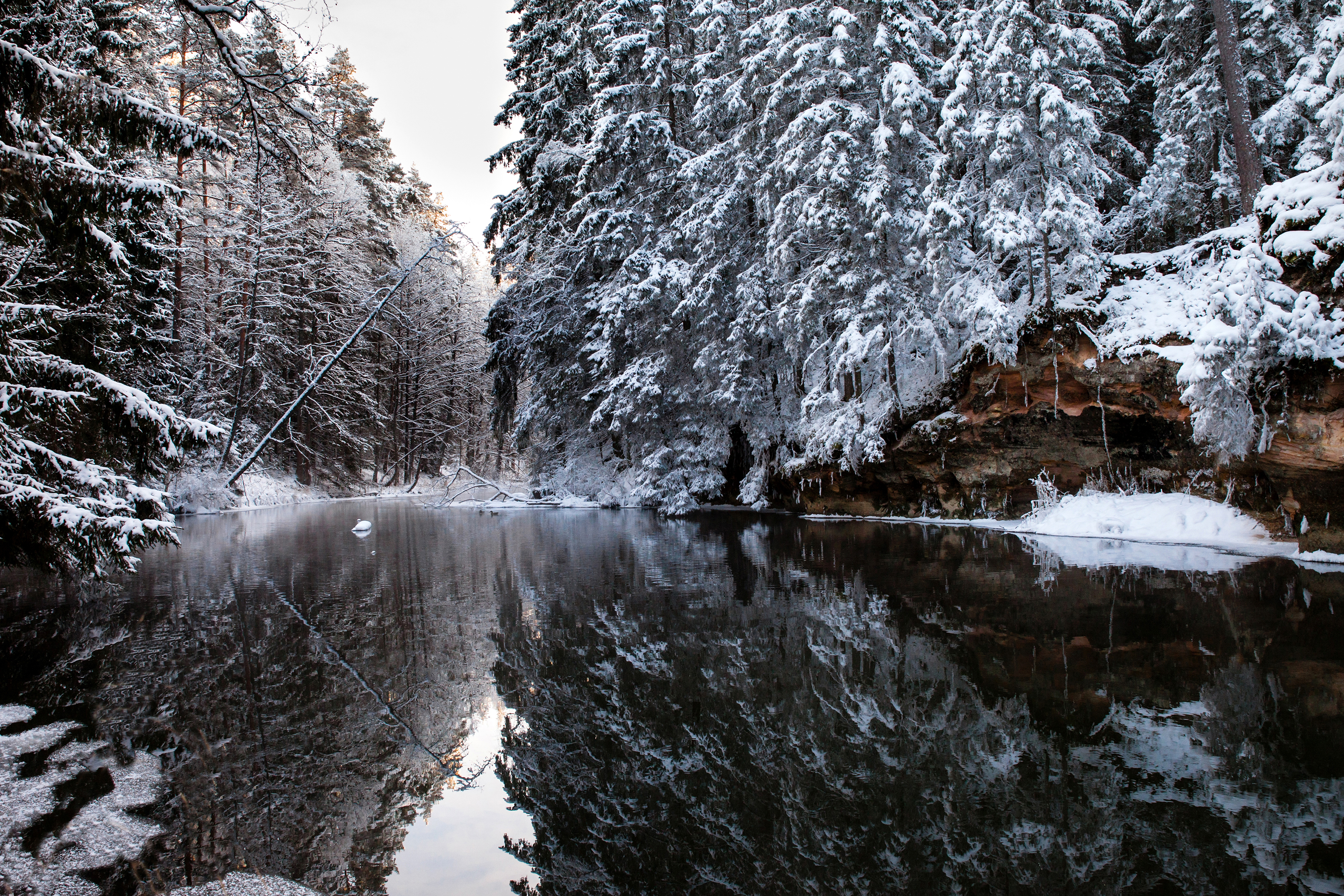
Winter in 2016
