= Kiidjärve =

Village in Estonia

- Village
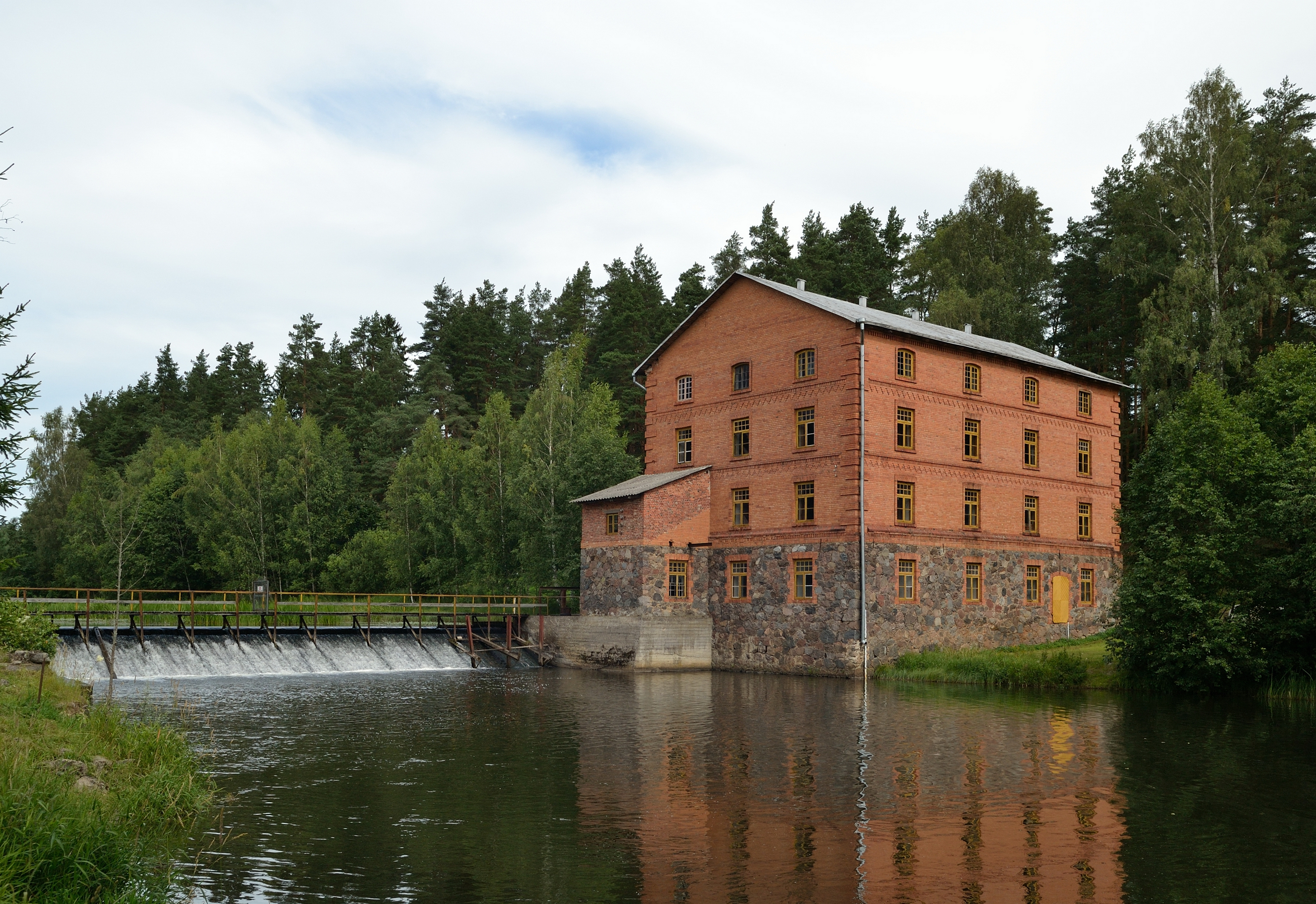
- The Kiidjärve watermill on the Ahja River

- Location in Estonia
- Coordinates: 58°08′08″N 27°00′48″E
- Country: Estonia
- County: Põlva County
- Municipality: Põlva Parish

Population (2011 Census)
  - Total: 168

Kiidjärve (German: Kiddijerw) is a village in Põlva Parish, Põlva County in southeastern Estonia. It is located about 9 km (6 mi) north of the town of Põlva and about 30 km (19 mi) southeast of the city of Tartu, by the Tartu–Pechory railway and the Ahja River. The village territory includes the Saesaare Reservoir with a hydroelectric power station and the Valgesoo Bog (a landscape protection area).

As of the 2011 census, the settlement's population was 168.

In Kiidjärve, there is a railway halt on Elron's Tartu–Koidula line, but it is served by only one train a day. The journey from/to Tartu takes about 45 minutes.

Kiidjärve is home to "Maarja Village" (Maarja Küla), a facility for young adults with learning disabilities.

== Kiidjärve Manor ==
Kiidjärve was the location of Kiidjärve Manor (German: Kiddijerw), first mentioned at the end of the 17th century. It initially belonged to the Zoege von Manteuffel family, but it changed owners very often thereafter. The last baron, Erich von Maydell, built a red brick watermill on the Ahja River in 1914. In 1922, the manor was dispossessed and gifted to Independence War veteran Victor Mutt. The manor's classicist wooden main building was destroyed during a fire in 1950. In 2003, a new culture house and library was built on the site. The surrounding park was created in the second half of the 18th century and was placed under natural protection in 1972.

== Notable people ==
- Ene Järvis (1947–2025), actress, born in Kiidjärve
- Kalmer Tennosaar (1928–2004), singer and television journalist, born in Kiidjärve

== Gallery ==
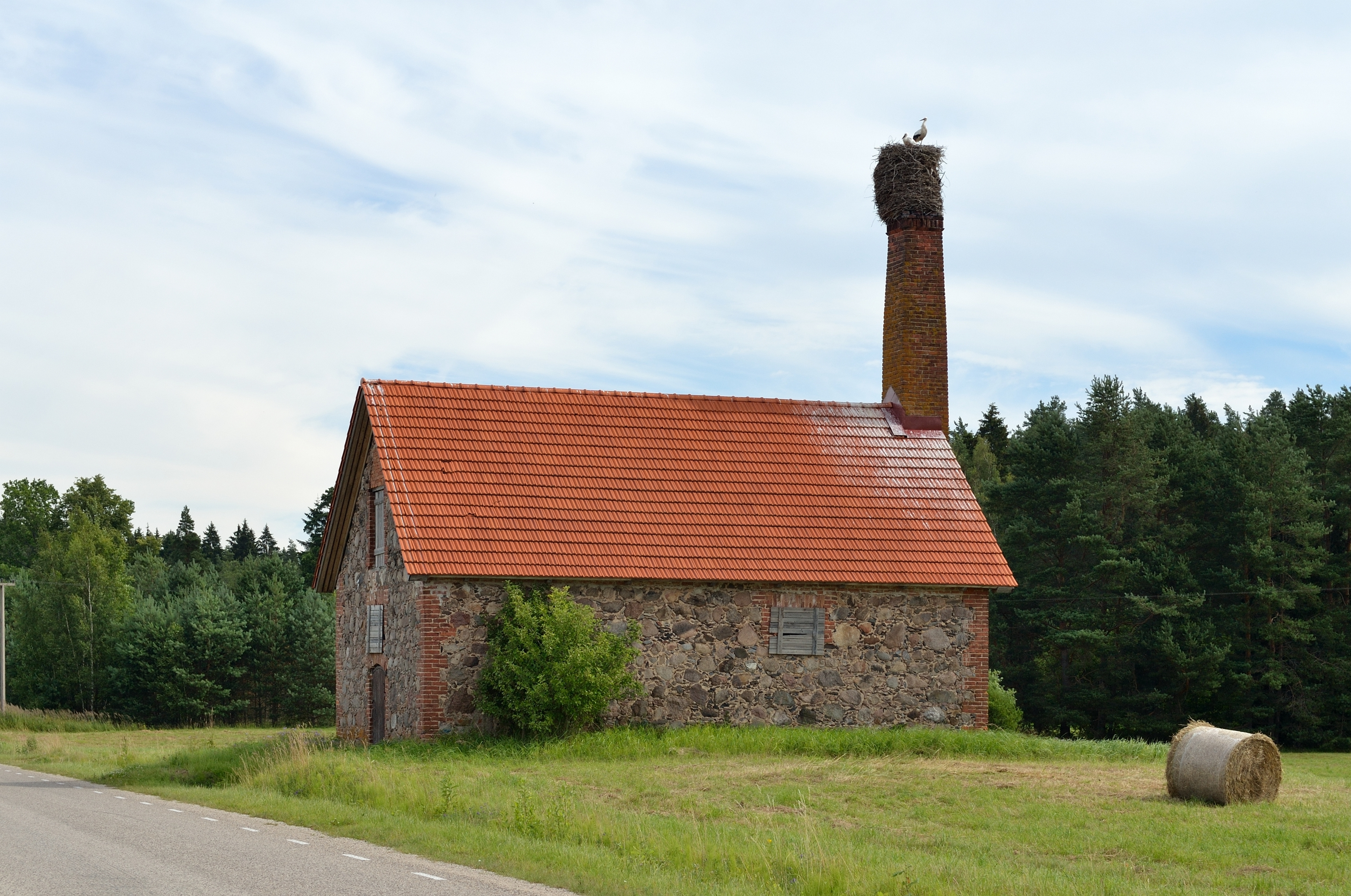
Kiidjärve Manor's grain drying kiln

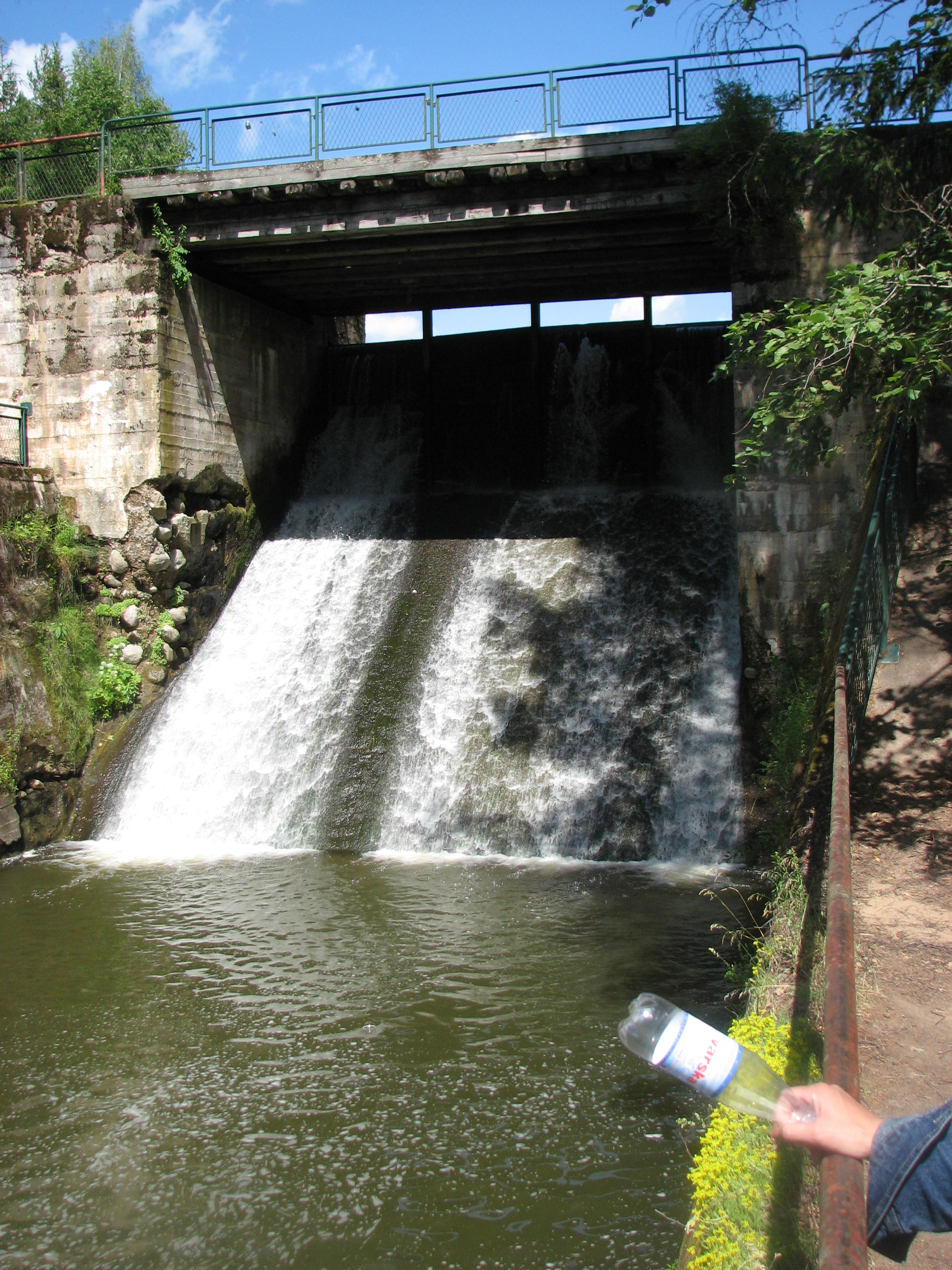
Dam of the Saesaare hydroelectric power plant

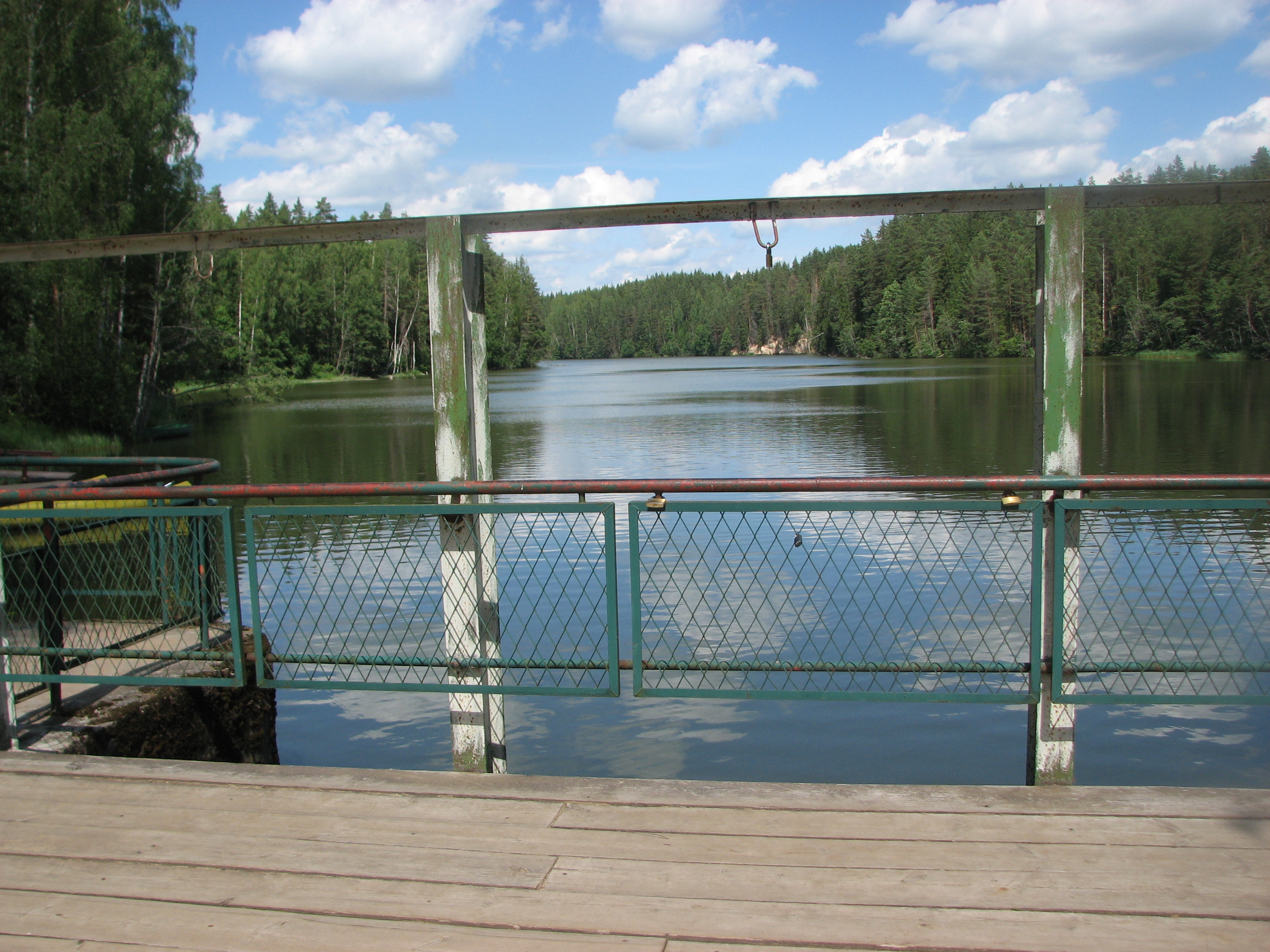
Saesaare Reservoir

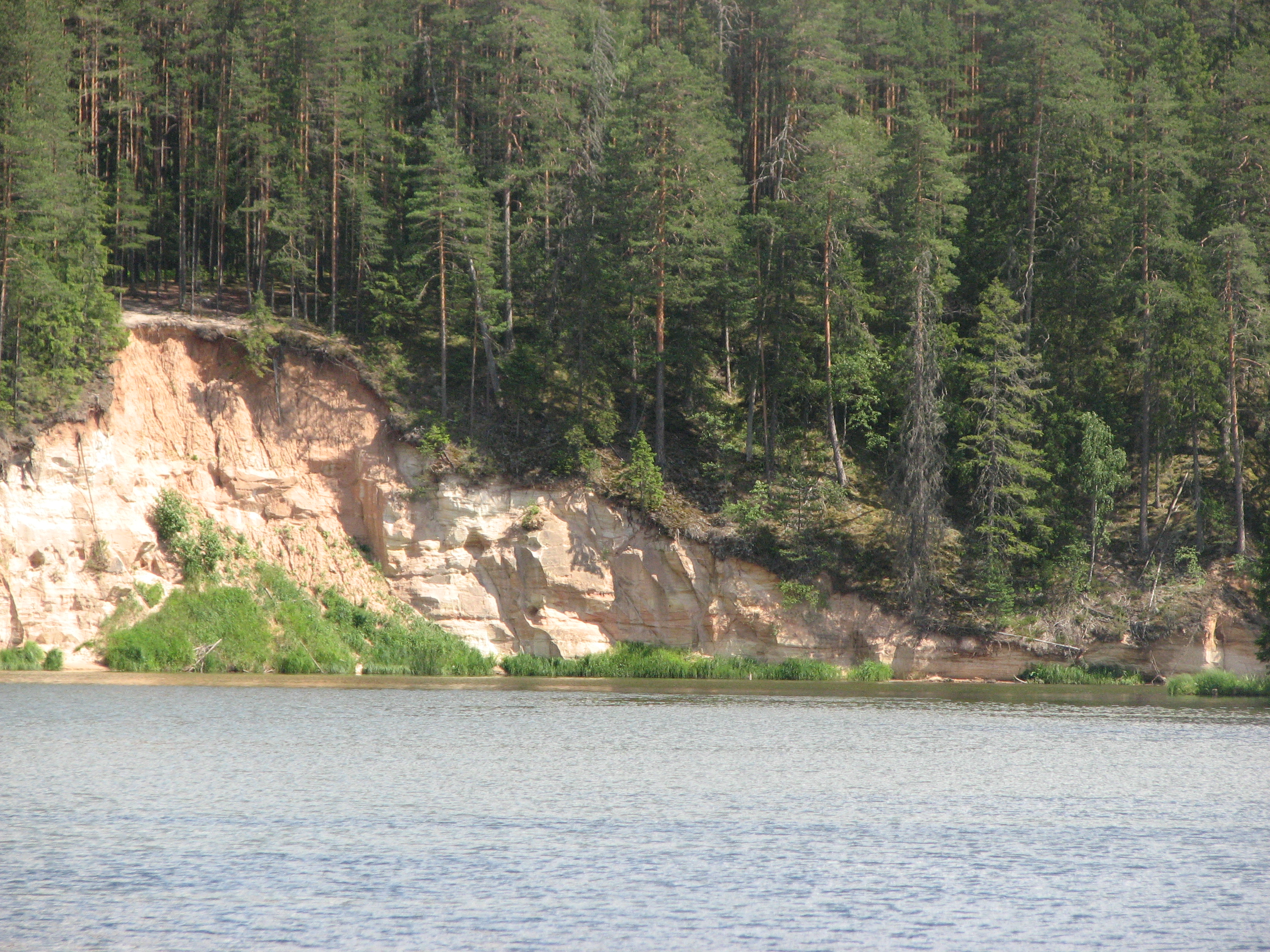
Saesaare Reservoir

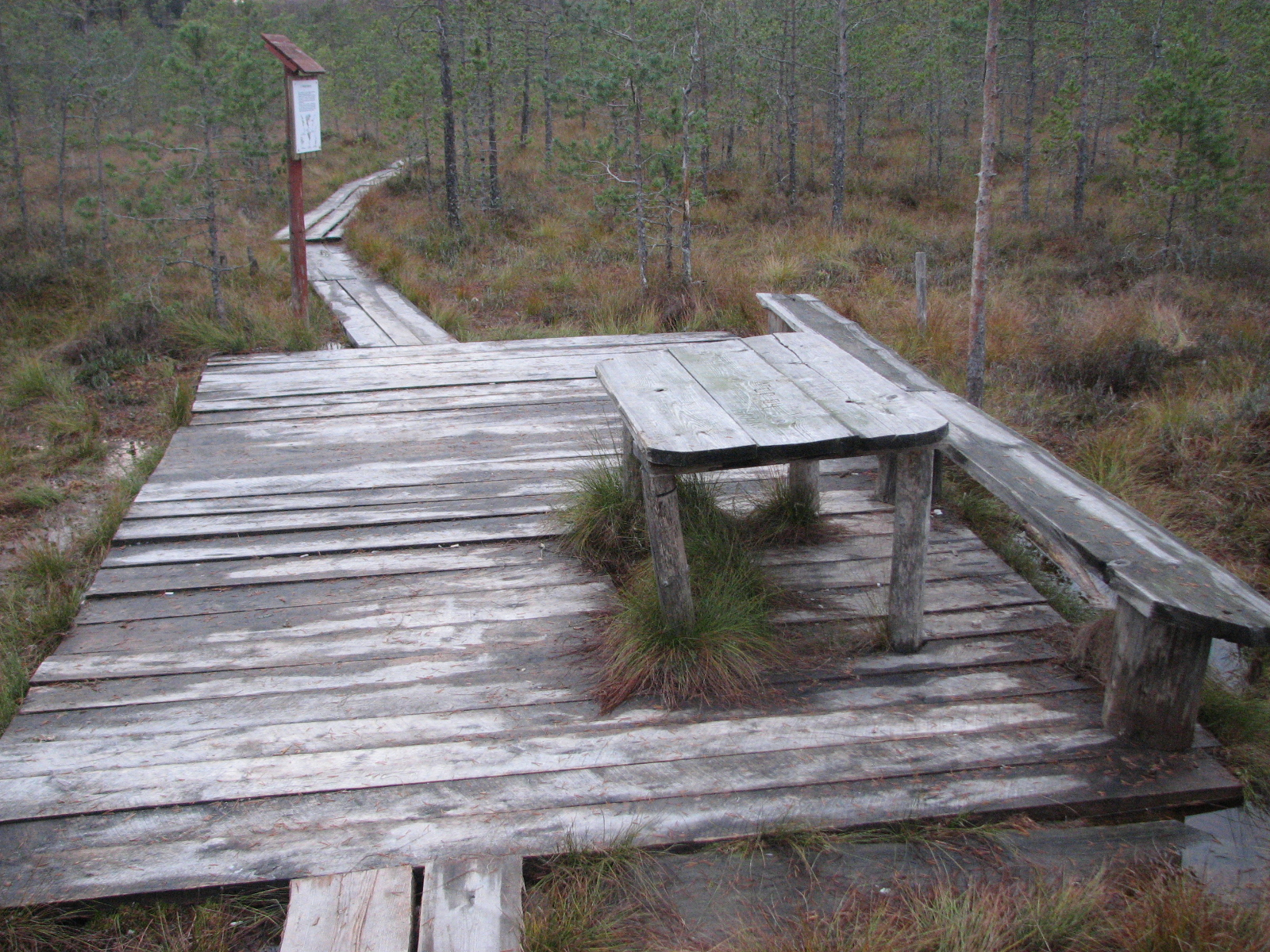
Valgesoo landscape protection area

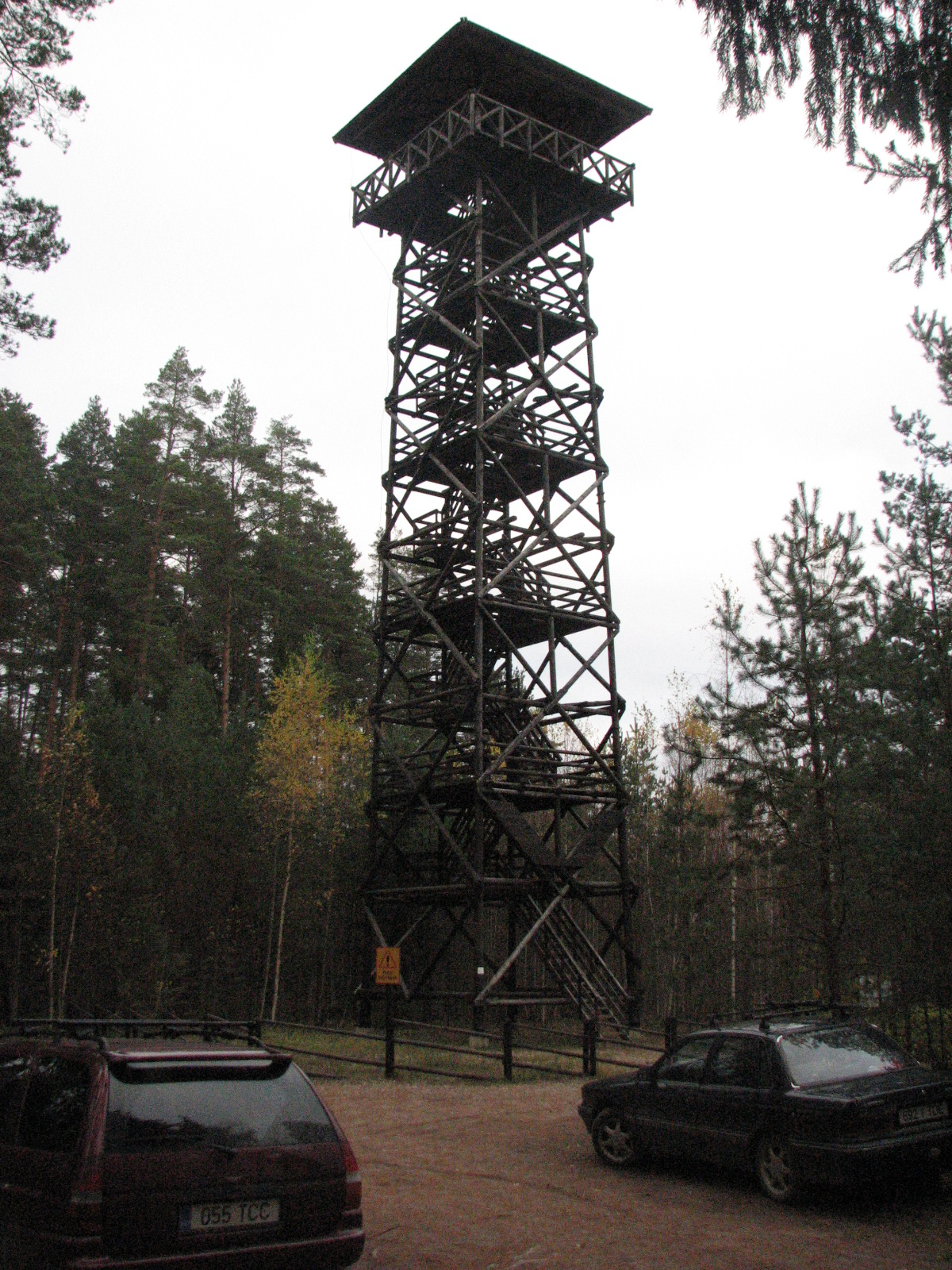
Observation tower in Valgesoo

Preceding station	Elron	Following station
Valgemetsa towards Tallinn	Tallinn–Tartu–Koidula	Taevaskoja towards Koidula
