= Karla, Kose Parish =

Village in Estonia

Coordinates: 59°10′17″N 25°07′27″E

Karla (Kose)
- Village
- Interactive map of Karla (Kose)
- Country: Estonia
- County: Harju County
- Parish: Kose Parish
- Time zone: UTC+2 (EET)
  - Summer (DST): UTC+3 (EEST)

Karla is a village in Kose Parish, Harju County in northern Estonia.

First written record of the village is from 1241 in Danish landmeasuring book (Liber Census Daniae).

Before the Great Northern War (1700–1721) there were 3 villages in the current territory: Kirimäe (13 farms), Söönurme (3 farms) and Karla (17 farms). After the plague (1711) and robbers - there were only 6 families left.

In 1805, there was a Kose-Uuemõisa rebellion from the village farmers against landlords. One of the rebel leaders was Kõlli Toomas from Karla village.

In 1944, during the bombardment of Tallinn, one Russian bomber crashed between Vetka and Matsuhansu farm.

In 1949, by the order from the Soviet state, new kolkhoz was initiated in the village.

After the re-independence of Republic of Estonia, in 1991, there was a local community movement to restore village history and traditions.

Nowadays, the village is mostly known for its horticultural farms and nurseries. Internationally most well-known is Roogoja Farm and family Kivistik (Clematis, grapes and vines) and their one of the most northern collection garden.
