= Kõue Parish =

Former municipality of Estonia

Coordinates: 59°5′57.96″N 25°21′36.53″E

Kõue Parish Kõue vald
- Former municipality of Estonia
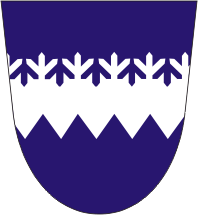
- Flag Coat of arms

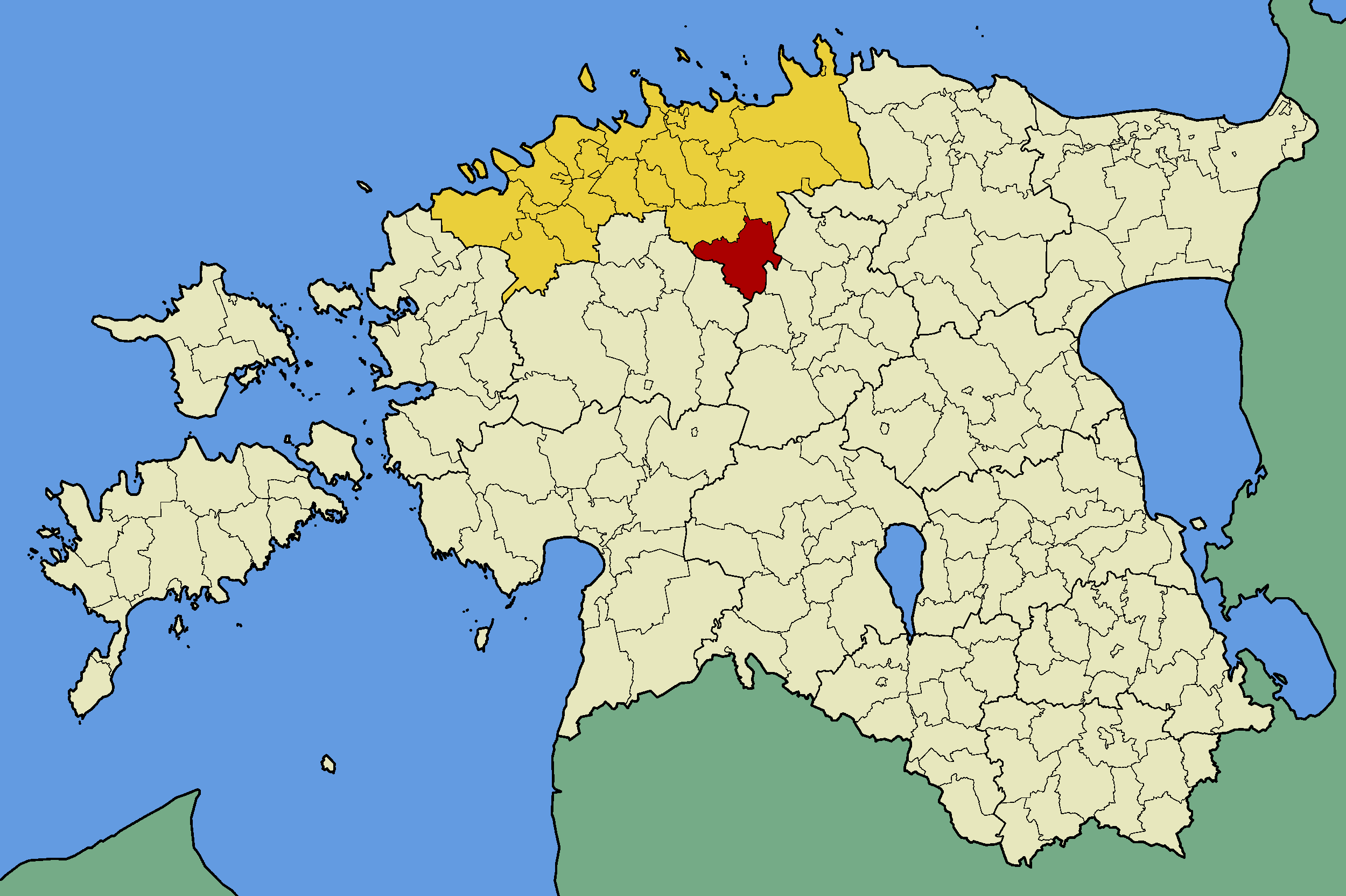
- Kõue Parish within Harju County in 2009.
- Country: Estonia
- County: Harju County
- Administrative centre: Ardu

Area
  - Total: 295.5 km^{2} (114.1 sq mi)

Population (01.01.2009)
  - Total: 1,685
  - Density: 5.702/km^{2} (14.77/sq mi)
- Website: www.koue.ee

Kõue Parish (Estonian: Kõue vald) was a rural municipality in Harju County, Estonia.

In October 2013, Kõue Parish was merged with neighbouring Kose Parish and therefore ceased to exist.

On 1 January 2009, the municipality had a population of 1,685 and covered an area of 295.5 km^{2}. The population density is 5.7022/km^{2} (14.769/sq mi). The current mayor (vallavanem) is Ott Valdma.

Administrative centre of the municipality was Ardu small borough (alevik), located 57 km from Tallinn on the Tallinn–Tartu highway. Besides Ardu there was also Habaja small borough and 36 villages in Kõue Parish: Aela, Äksi, Alansi, Harmi, Kadja, Kantküla, Katsina, Kirivalla, Kiruvere, Kõrvenurga, Kõue, Kukepala, Laane, Leistu, Lööra, Lutsu, Marguse, Nõmmeri, Nutu, Ojasoo, Pala, Paunaste, Paunküla, Puusepa, Rava, Riidamäe, Rõõsa, Saarnakõrve, Sääsküla, Sae, Silmsi, Triigi, Uueveski, Vahetüki, Vanamõisa, Virla.
