= Katsina (disambiguation) =

Katsina State is a state in northwestern Nigeria.

Katsina may also refer to:

- Katsina (city), the capital city of Katsina State
  - Katsina Airport, an airport in Katsina
  - Katsina United F.C., a Nigerian football club
  - Katsina University, a university in Katsina
- Katsina Ala River, a river in Nigeria
  - Katsina-Ala, a local government area of Benue State, Nigeria
- Katsina, Estonia, a village in Estonia
- Kachina, a spirit in the Pueblo religion
