= Tasuja Oja =

Estonian politician

Tasuja Oja (born Benedikt Oskar Oja; 5 August 1888, in Kuivajõe – 1946, in Leningrad Oblast, Russia) was an Estonian politician, civil servant and educator. He was a member of the II and III Riigikogu, representing the Estonian Labour Party. He was a member of the Riigikogu since 18 July 1923. He replaced Arnold Schulbach.

Oja was arrested by the Soviet occupation authorities on 9 December 1944 in Rannamõisa where he was employed as a schoolmaster. He was sentenced to seven years imprisonment. He died in 1946 in prison custody in Leningrad Oblast in 1946.
