= Lutsu =

Lutsu may refer to several places in Estonia:

- Lutsu, Harju County, village in Kose Parish, Harju County
- Lutsu, Põlva County, village in Põlva Parish, Põlva County
- Lutsu, Valga County, village in Valga Parish, Valga County
