= Krei =

Village in Estonia

- Village
- Location in Estonia
- Coordinates: 59°11′32″N 25°07′10″E
- Country: Estonia
- County: Harju County
- Municipality: Kose Parish

Population (2011 Census)
  - Total: 138

Krei is a village in Kose Parish, Harju County in northern Estonia. It is located between Kose and the Tallinn–Tartu road (E263), Kose-Uuemõisa is situated northwest. The village's territory is passed through by the Pirita River. As of the 2011 census, the settlement's population was 138.

An ecovillage for 44 families is planned in Krei. It is predicted that the engineering will start in 2013 and the construction of houses in 2014.
