= Kose Airfield =

Airfield in Estonia

Coordinates: 59°10′07″N 025°04′16″E

Kose Airfield (Estonian: Kose lennuväli; ICAO: EEKO) is an airfield in Kose Parish, Harju County, Estonia.

The airfield's owner manager is Tiit Viirelaid.
