= Volle =

Volle may refer to:

- Volle, 2005 novel from the Argaea series by Kyell Gold
- Võlle, village in Kose Parish, Harju County, Estonia

People

- Dag Krister Volle (1963–1998; better known as Denniz Pop), Swedish DJ, music producer and songwriter
- Frédéric Volle (born 1966), French handball player
- Mélanie Berger-Volle (born 1921), Austrian-born French veteran
- Michael Volle (born 1960), German operatic baritone
- Walter Volle (1913–2002), German rower

Heraldry

- Vol (heraldry), a pair of conjoined wings (or "wings conjoined")
