= Aela, Estonia =

Village in Estonia

Aela
- Village
- Location within Estonia
- Country: Estonia
- County: Harju County
- Municipality: Kose Parish
- Time zone: UTC+2 (EET)
  - Summer (DST): UTC+3 (EEST)

Grus grus in Aela

Aela is a village in Kose Parish, Harju County, northern Estonia. It was a part of Kõue Parish before 2013.

== See also ==
- Aela Landscape Conservation Area
