= Harmi =

Village in Estonia

- Village
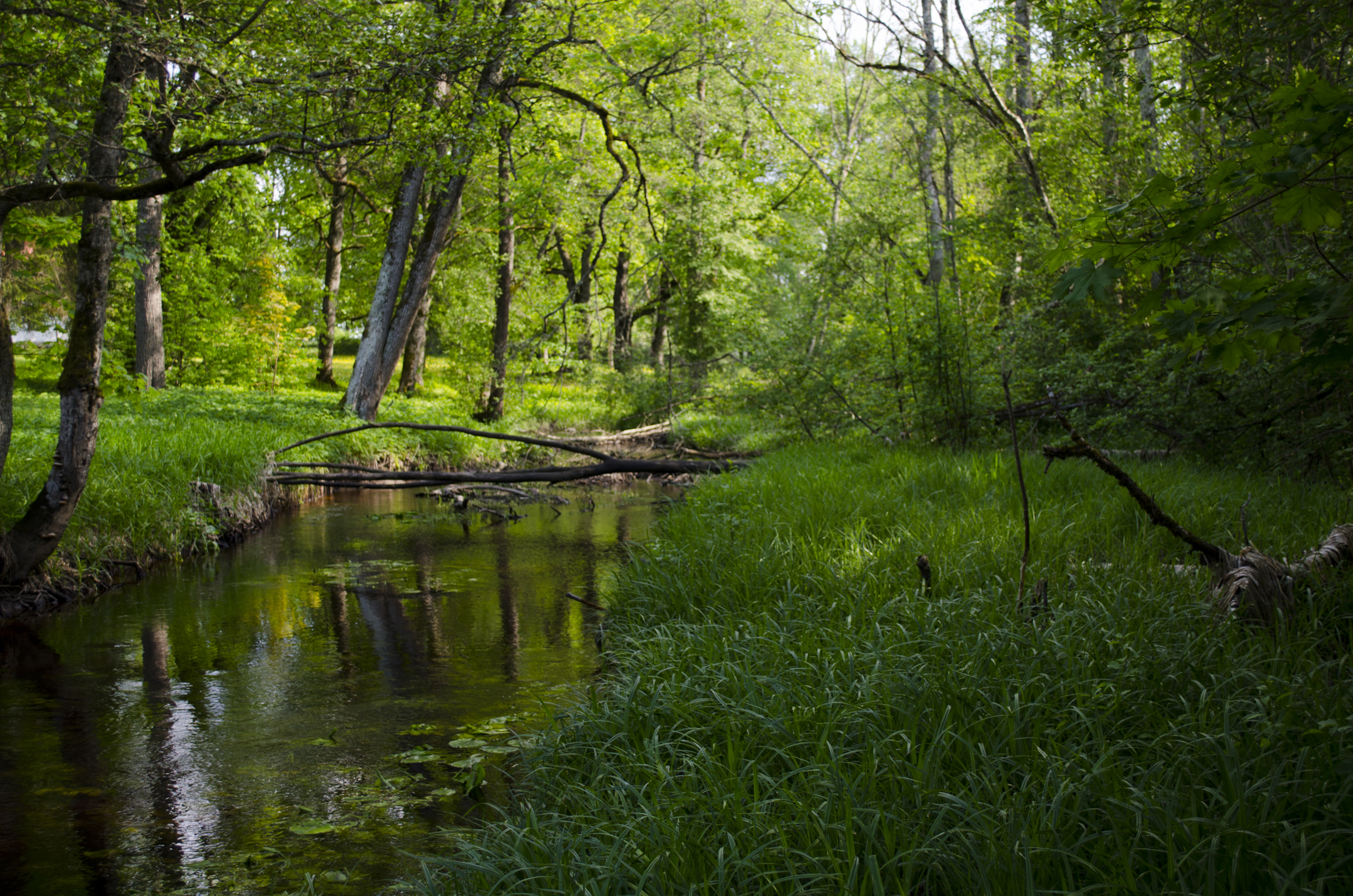
- Kuivajõgi river in Harmi Manor park
- Interactive map of Harmi
- Coordinates: 59°07′N 25°12′E
- Country: Estonia
- County: Harju County
- Municipality: Kose Parish
- Time zone: UTC+2 (EET)
  - Summer (DST): UTC+3 (EEST)

Harmi is a village in Kose Parish, Harju County, northern Estonia. As of 2011, the population of Harmi is 47. It was a part of Kõue Parish before 2013.

The village is home to Uue-Harmi Manor, established in established in 1646, previously belonging to various Baltic German families such as the Lodes, von Wrangels, von Taubes, Zoege von Mannteuffels and von Hippiuses. The main manor building now houses the Harmi Basic School.
