= Raveliku =

Village in Estonia

Coordinates: 59°10′N 25°16′E

- Village
- Interactive map of Raveliku
- Country: Estonia
- County: Harju County
- Parish: Kose Parish
- Time zone: UTC+2 (EET)
  - Summer (DST): UTC+3 (EEST)

Raveliku is a village in Kose Parish, Harju County in northern Estonia.
