= Ahisilla =

Village in Estonia

Coordinates: 59°11′N 25°11′E

- Village
- Interactive map of Ahisilla
- Country: Estonia
- County: Harju County
- Parish: Kose Parish
- Time zone: UTC+2 (EET)
  - Summer (DST): UTC+3 (EEST)

Ahisilla is a village in Kose Parish, Harju County, northern Estonia.
