= Vardja, Harju County =

Village in Estonia

Vardja
- Village
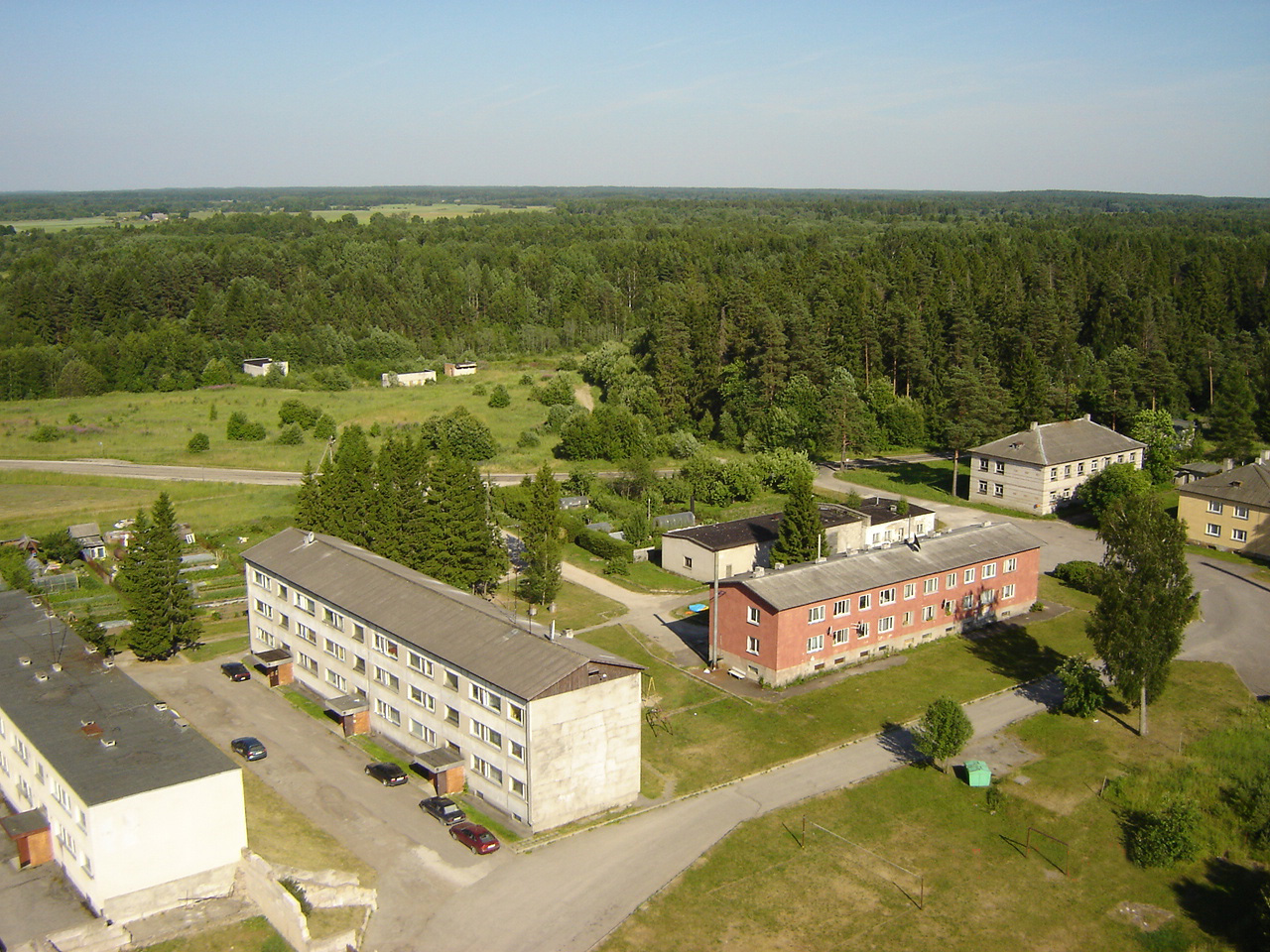

- Location in Estonia
- Coordinates: 59°10′17″N 25°12′38″E
- Country: Estonia
- County: Harju County
- Municipality: Kose Parish

Vardja is a village in Kose Parish, Harju County in northern Estonia.
