= Nutu =

Village in Estonia

- Village
- Interactive map of Nutu
- Coordinates: 59°04′N 25°13′E
- Country: Estonia
- County: Harju County
- Municipality: Kose Parish
- Time zone: UTC+2 (EET)
  - Summer (DST): UTC+3 (EEST)

Nutu is a village in Kose Parish, Harju County, northern Estonia. It was a part of Kõue Parish before 2013.
