= Kanavere =

Village in Estonia

Coordinates: 59°10′N 25°04′E

- Village
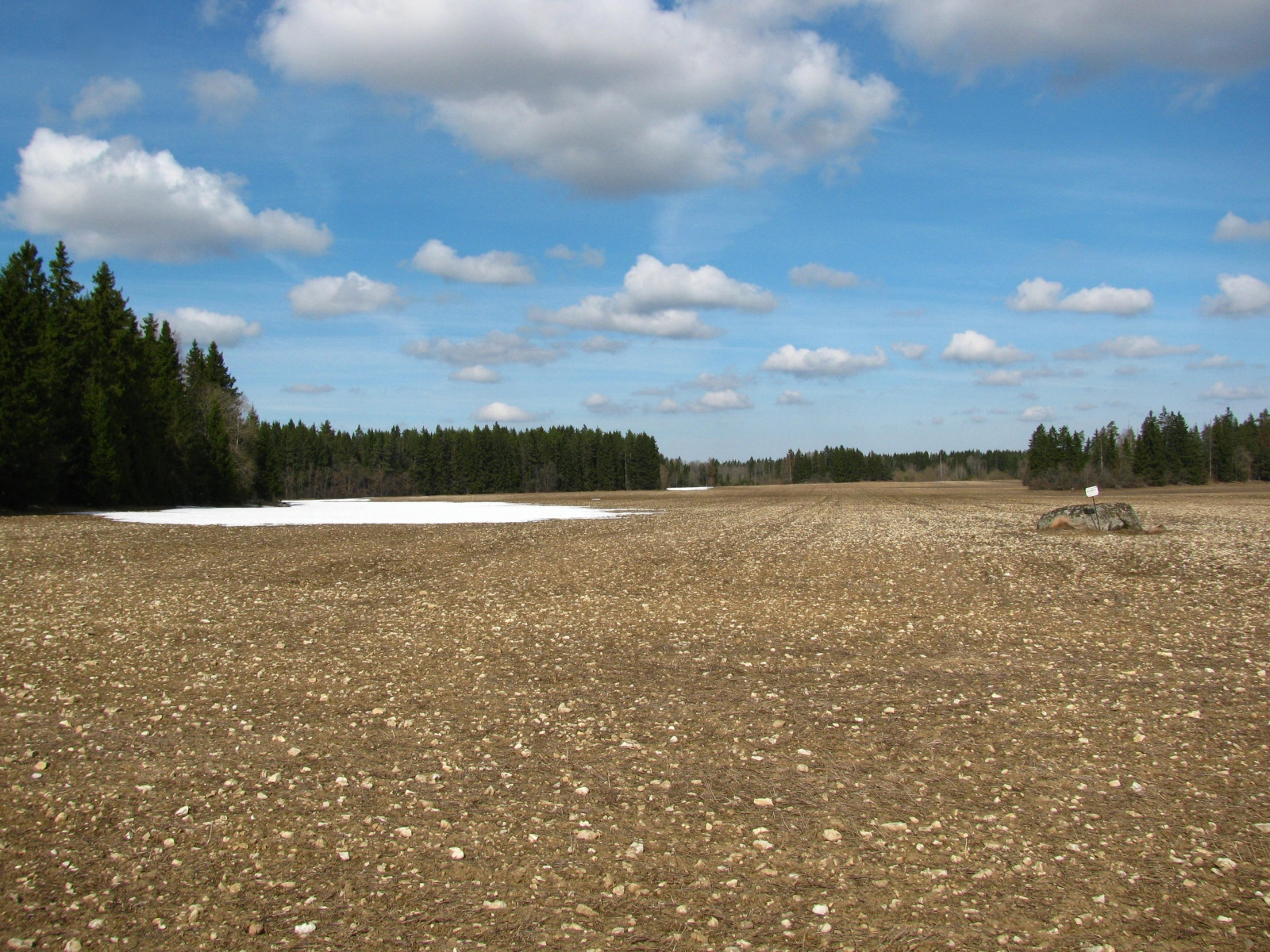
- Fallow field with cult stone in Kanavere
- Interactive map of Kanavere
- Country: Estonia
- County: Harju County
- Parish: Kose Parish
- Time zone: UTC+2 (EET)
  - Summer (DST): UTC+3 (EEST)

Kanavere is a village in Kose Parish, Harju County, northern Estonia.
