= Vanamõisa, Kose Parish =

Village in Estonia

Coordinates: 59°05′15″N 25°27′16″E

Vanamõisa
- Village
- Interactive map of Vanamõisa
- Country: Estonia
- County: Harju County
- Municipality: Kose Parish
- Time zone: UTC+2 (EET)
  - Summer (DST): UTC+3 (EEST)

Vanamõisa is a village in Kose Parish, Harju County in northern Estonia. It was a part of Kõue Parish before 2013.
