= Oru, Harju County =

Village in Estonia

Coordinates: 59°11′21″N 24°59′05″E

Oru (Kose)
- Village
- Interactive map of Oru (Kose)
- Country: Estonia
- County: Harju County
- Parish: Kose Parish
- Time zone: UTC+2 (EET)
  - Summer (DST): UTC+3 (EEST)

Oru is a village in Kose Parish, Harju County in northern Estonia.
