= Puusepa, Harju County =

Village in Estonia

Coordinates: 59°08′30″N 25°19′47″E

Puusepa
- Village
- Interactive map of Puusepa
- Country: Estonia
- County: Harju County
- Municipality: Kose Parish
- Time zone: UTC+2 (EET)
  - Summer (DST): UTC+3 (EEST)

Puusepa is a village in Kose Parish, Harju County, northern Estonia. Its mayor is Rory Bessell. It was a part of Kõue Parish before 2013.
