= Äksi, Harju County =

Village in Estonia

Coordinates: 59°7′N 25°10′E

Äksi
- Village
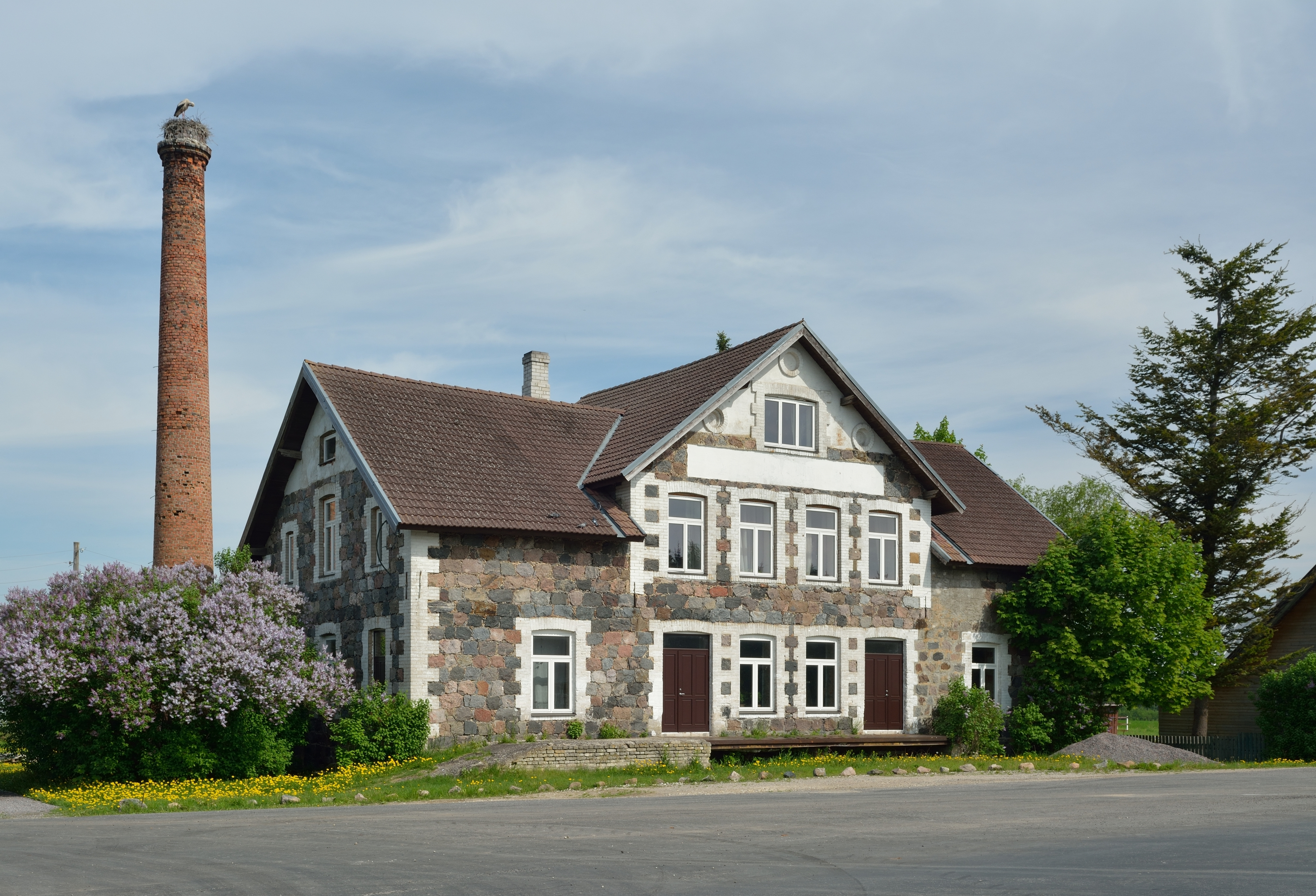
- Former Äksi dairy
- Interactive map of Äksi
- Country: Estonia
- County: Harju County
- Municipality: Kose Parish
- Time zone: UTC+2 (EET)
  - Summer (DST): UTC+3 (EEST)

Äksi is a village in Kose Parish, Harju County, northern Estonia. It was part of Kõue Parish before 2013.
