= Uueveski =

Village in Estonia

Coordinates: 59°08′N 25°12′E

- Village
- Interactive map of Uueveski
- Country: Estonia
- County: Harju County
- Municipality: Kose Parish
- Time zone: UTC+2 (EET)
  - Summer (DST): UTC+3 (EEST)

Uueveski is a village in Kose Parish, Harju County, northern Estonia. It was a part of Kõue Parish before 2013.
