= Kata, Estonia =

Village in Estonia

Coordinates: 59°11′30″N 24°57′05″E

Kata
- Village
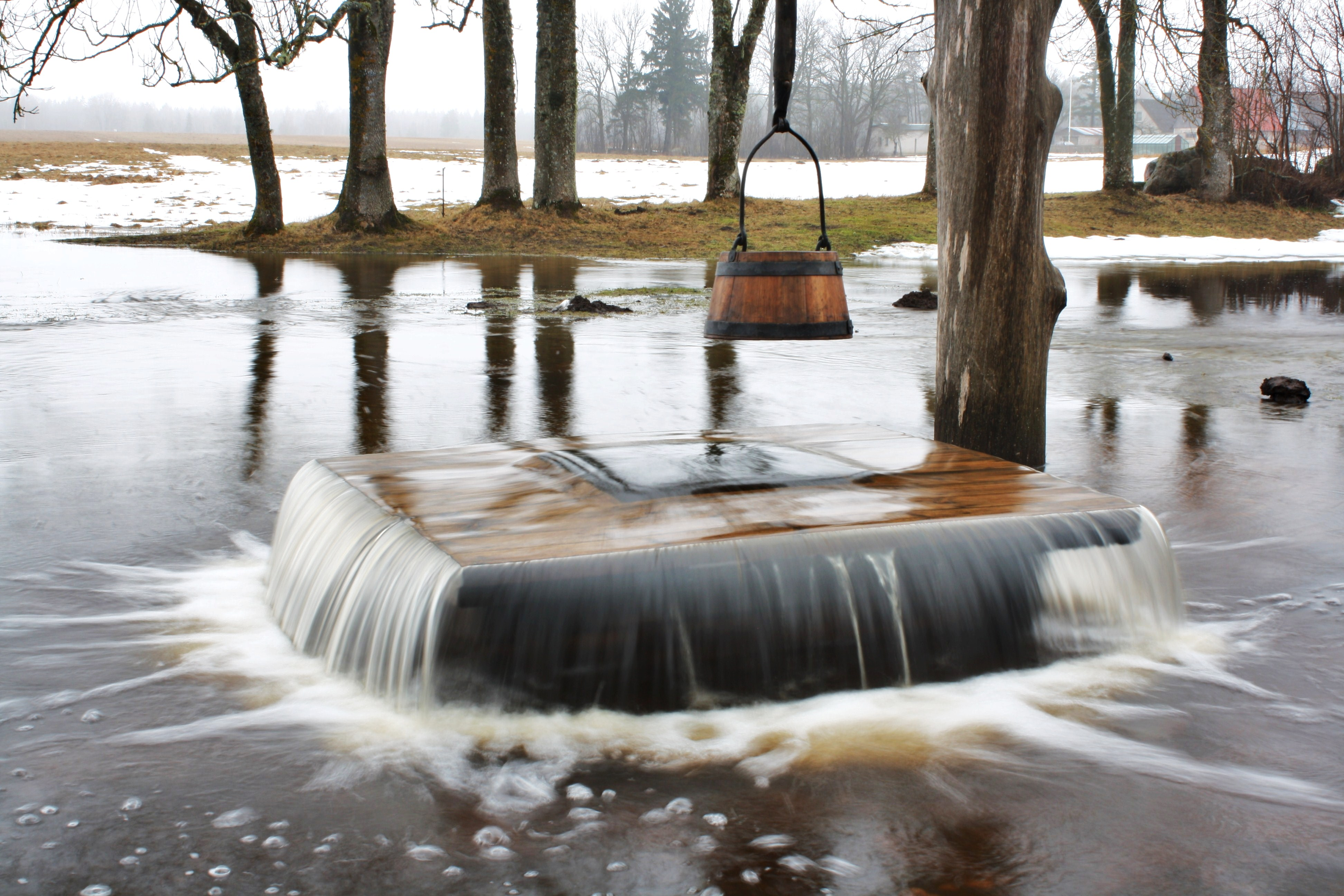
- Tuhala Witch's Well, a karst spring in Kata
- Interactive map of Kata
- Country: Estonia
- County: Harju
- Parish: Kose

Population (2011)
  - Total: 71
- Time zone: UTC+2 (EET)
  - Summer (DST): UTC+3 (EEST)

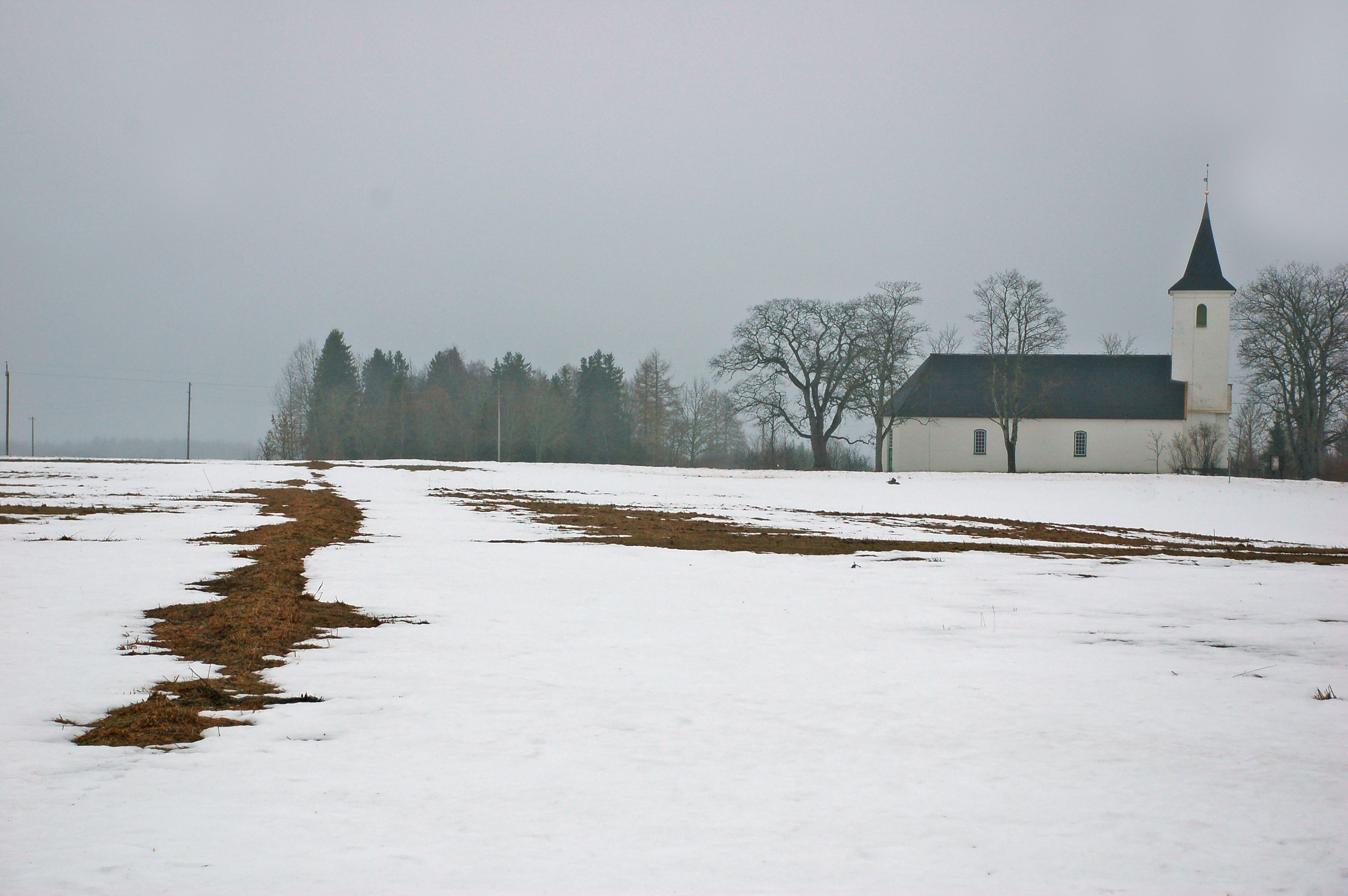
Tuhala church in Kata

Kata is a village in Kose Parish, Harju County in northern Estonia.
