= Sõmeru, Kose Parish =

Village in Estonia

Coordinates: 59°10′32″N 25°16′31″E

Sõmeru (Kose)
- Village
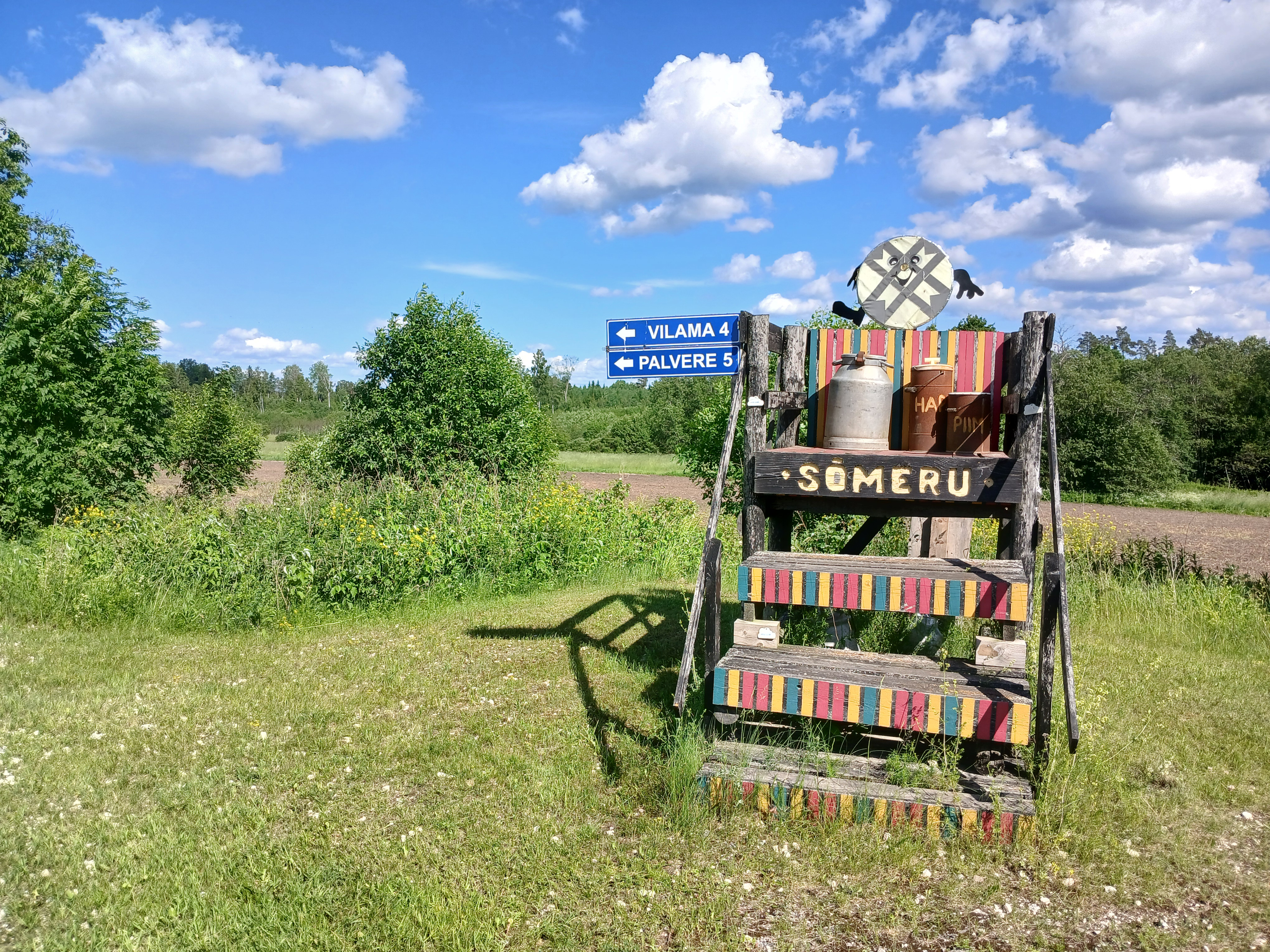
- Interactive map of Sõmeru (Kose)
- Country: Estonia
- County: Harju County
- Parish: Kose Parish
- Time zone: UTC+2 (EET)
  - Summer (DST): UTC+3 (EEST)

Sõmeru (German: Sommerhof) is a village in Kose Parish, Harju County in northern Estonia.
