= Rava, Harju County =

Village in Estonia

Coordinates: 59°05′54″N 25°16′52″E

Rava
- Village
- Interactive map of Rava
- Country: Estonia
- County: Harju County
- Municipality: Kose Parish
- Time zone: UTC+2 (EET)
  - Summer (DST): UTC+3 (EEST)

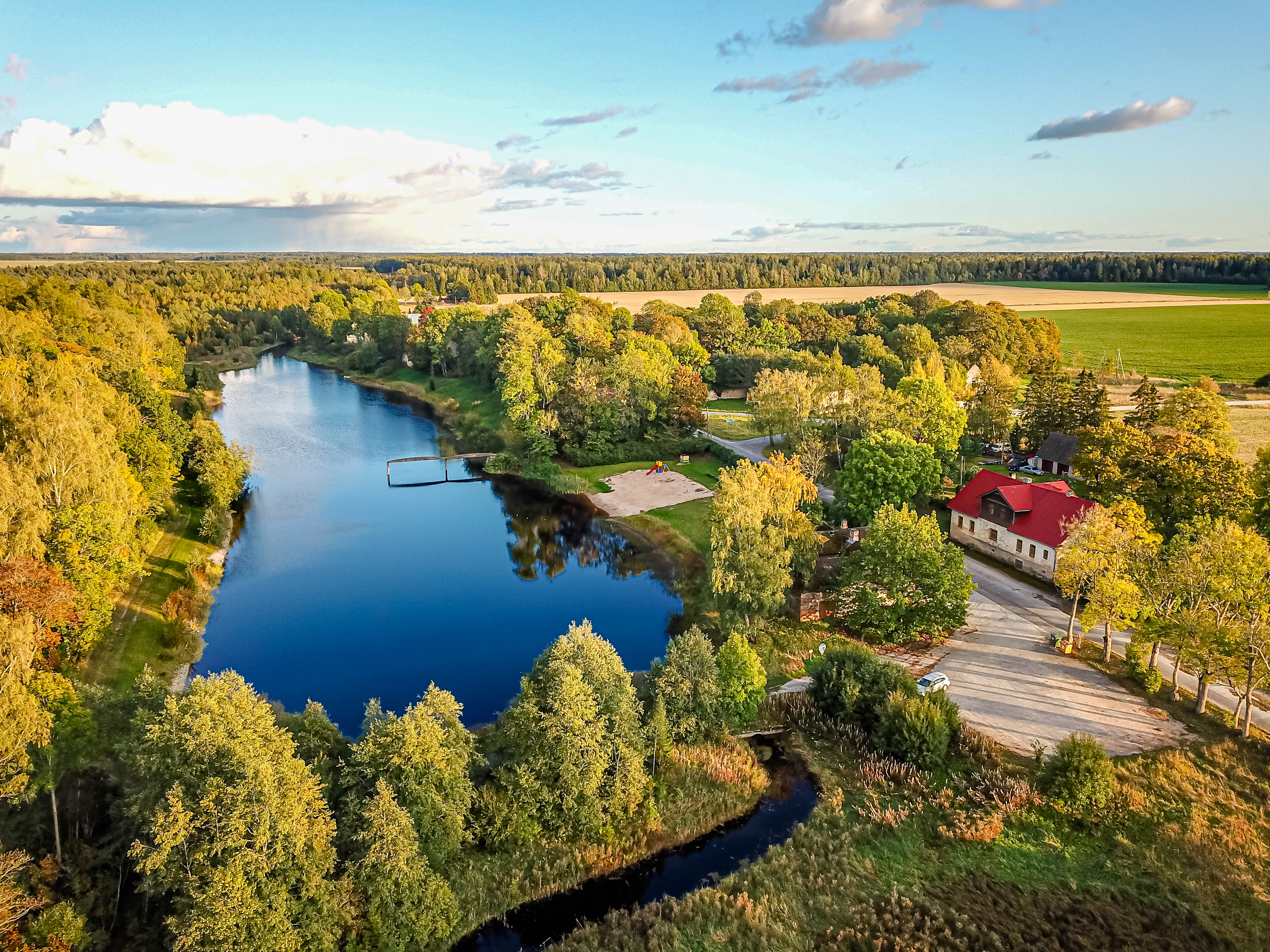
Rava Reservoir

Rava is a village in Kose Parish, Harju County, northern Estonia. It was a part of Kõue Parish before 2013.
