= Katsina, Estonia =

Village in Estonia

Coordinates: 59°05′N 25°18′E

Katsina
- Village
- Interactive map of Katsina
- Country: Estonia
- County: Harju County
- Municipality: Kose Parish
- Time zone: UTC+2 (EET)
  - Summer (DST): UTC+3 (EEST)

Katsina is a village in Kose Parish, Harju County in northern Estonia. The population is 3 as of 2021. It was a part of Kõue Parish before 2013.
