= Habaja =

Borough in Estonia

Coordinates: 59°06′N 25°11′E

- Small borough
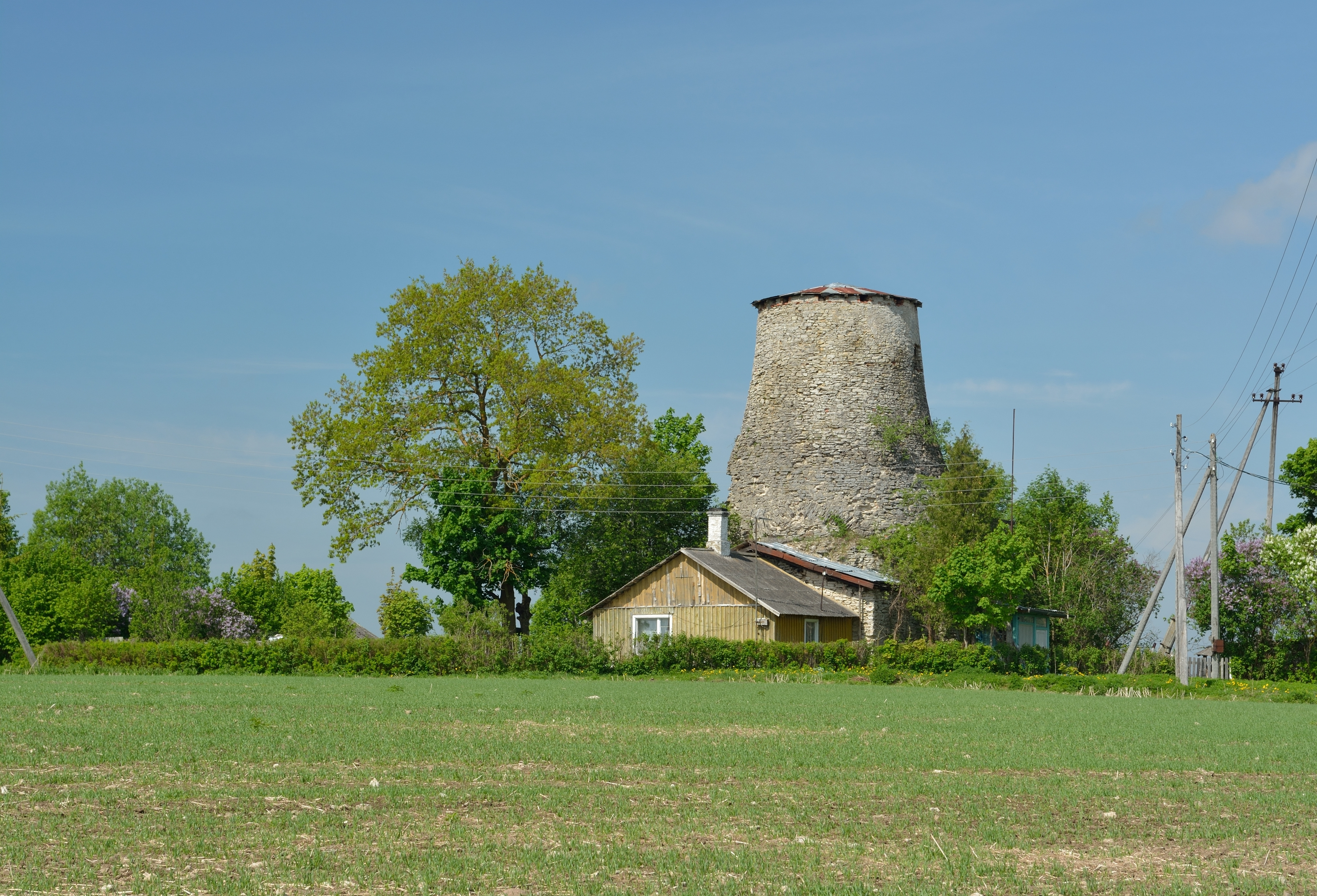
- Ruins of Habaja manor windmill
- Interactive map of Habaja
- Country: Estonia
- County: Harju County
- Municipality: Kose Parish
- Time zone: UTC+2 (EET)
  - Summer (DST): UTC+3 (EEST)

Habaja (German: Habbat) is a small borough (Estonian: alevik) in Kose Parish, Harju County, northern Estonia.
