= Lööra =

Village in Estonia

Coordinates: 59°09′N 25°09′E

- Village
- Interactive map of Lööra
- Country: Estonia
- County: Harju County
- Municipality: Kose Parish
- Time zone: UTC+2 (EET)
  - Summer (DST): UTC+3 (EEST)

Lööra is a village in Kose Parish, Harju County in northern Estonia.
