= Võlle =

Village in Estonia

Coordinates: 59°11′N 25°13′E

- Village
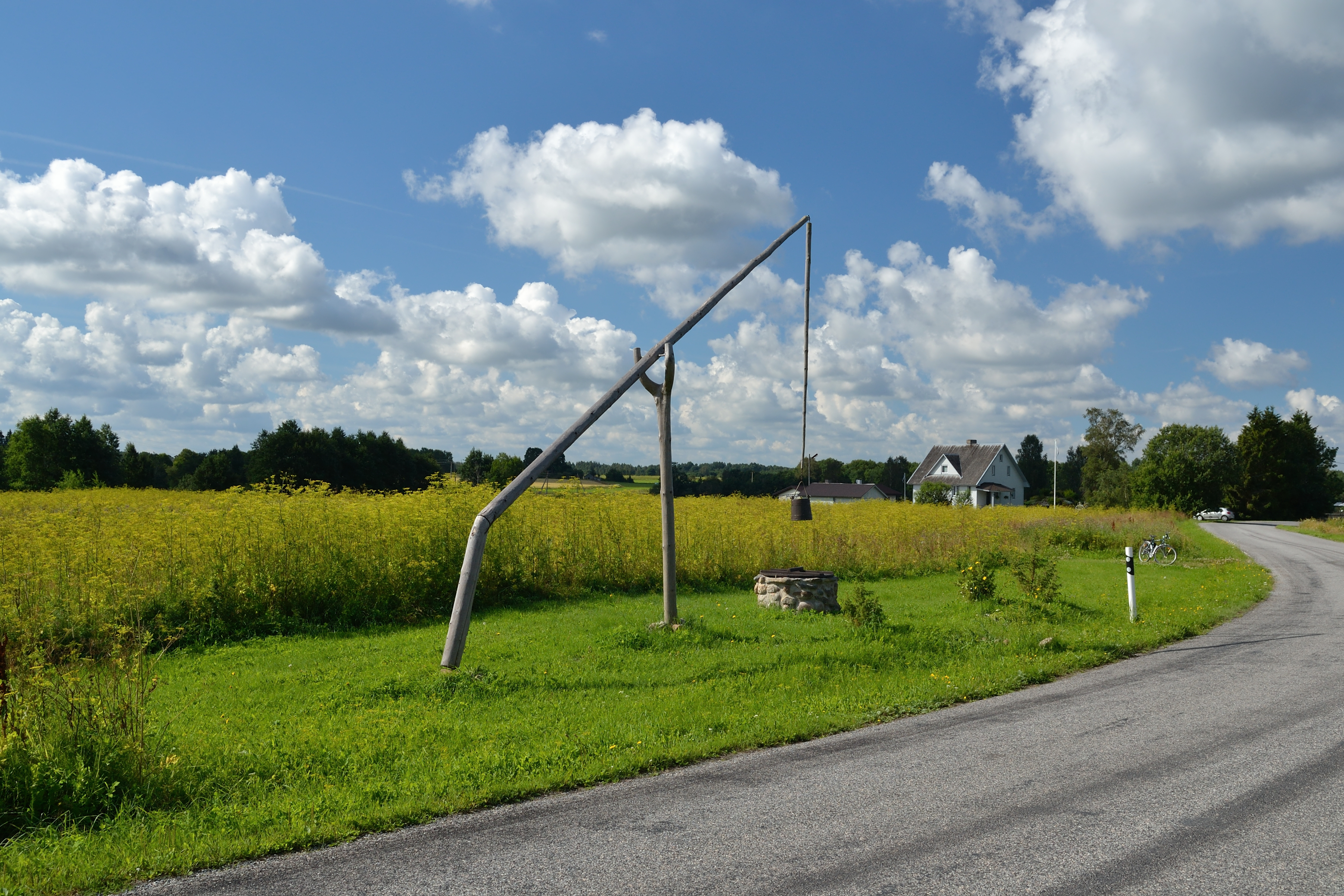
- Shadoof in village
- Interactive map of Võlle
- Country: Estonia
- County: Harju County
- Parish: Kose Parish
- Time zone: UTC+2 (EET)
  - Summer (DST): UTC+3 (EEST)

Võlle is a village in Kose Parish, Harju County in northern Estonia.
