= Kose Parish =

Municipality of Estonia (from 2013)

Coordinates: 59°11′N 25°10′E

Kose Parish Kose vald
- Municipality of Estonia
- Flag Coat of arms

- Kose Parish within Harju County.
- Country: Estonia
- County: Harju County
- Administrative centre: Kose

Government
  - Mayor: Merle Pussak

Area
  - Total: 532.85 km^{2} (205.73 sq mi)

Population (22.01.2016)
  - Total: 7,183
  - Density: 13.48/km^{2} (34.91/sq mi)
- ISO 3166 code: EE-338
- Website: www.kosevald.ee

Kose Parish (Estonian: Kose vald) is a rural municipality in northern Estonia. It is a part of Harju County. The municipality has a population of 5,737 (as of 1 January 2004) and covers an area of 237.33 km^{2} (91.63 sq mi). The population density is 24.2 inhabitants per km^{2}.

In October 2013, neighbouring Kõue Parish was merged with Kose Parish.

The administrative centre of the municipality is the small borough (Estonian: alevik) of Kose. There are total of 5 small boroughs (Ardu, Habaja, Kose, Kose-Uuemõisa and Ravila) and 58 villages in Kose Parish: Aela, Ahisilla, Äksi, Alansi, Harmi, Kadja, Kanavere, Kantküla, Karla, Kata, Katsina, Kirivalla, Kiruvere, Kolu, Kõrvenurga, Kõue, Krei, Kuivajõe, Kukepala, Laane, Leistu, Liiva, Lööra, Lutsu, Marguse, Nõmbra, Nõmmeri, Nõrava, Nutu, Ojasoo, Oru, Pala, Palvere, Paunaste, Paunküla, Puusepa, Rava, Raveliku, Riidamäe, Rõõsa, Saarnakõrve, Sääsküla, Sae, Saula, Sõmeru, Silmsi, Tade, Tammiku, Triigi, Tuhala, Uueveski, Vahetüki, Vanamõisa, Vardja, Vilama, Virla, Viskla and Võlle.

== Notable people ==
- Ludwig August Mellin (1754 in Tuhala – 1835), was a Baltic German politician, cartographer, writer and publicist
- Ester Pajusoo (1934 in Nõmme – 2026), stage, film, radio and TV actress
- Jaan Künnap (born 1948 in Kõue), mountaineer, deep-sea diver, photographer, and sports coach
- Riho Unt (born 1956 in Kose), animated film director, scenarist, and artist.
- Marika Vaarik (born 1962 in Kose), film, TV, and theatre actress; co-founded the VAT Theatre
- Vallo Reimaa (born 1961 in Kose), politician; Minister of Regional Affairs, 2007/2008
- Liivo Leetma (born 1977 in Kose), football manager and former professional player; he played 327 games and 36 for Estonia
- Mord Fustang (born 1991 in Kose), real name Rauno Roosnurm, a DJ and music producer.

== Religion ==
Religion in Kose Parish (2021)
1. Unaffiliated (86.2%)
2. Lutheran (7.90%)
3. Orthodox (1.80%)
4. Others Christians (3.20%)
5. Others Religions or Unknown (0.90%)
6. 0.00%

== Twin towns — sister cities ==
- Ócsa, Hungary
- Peräseinäjoki, Finland
- Plášťovce, Slovakia

== Gallery ==
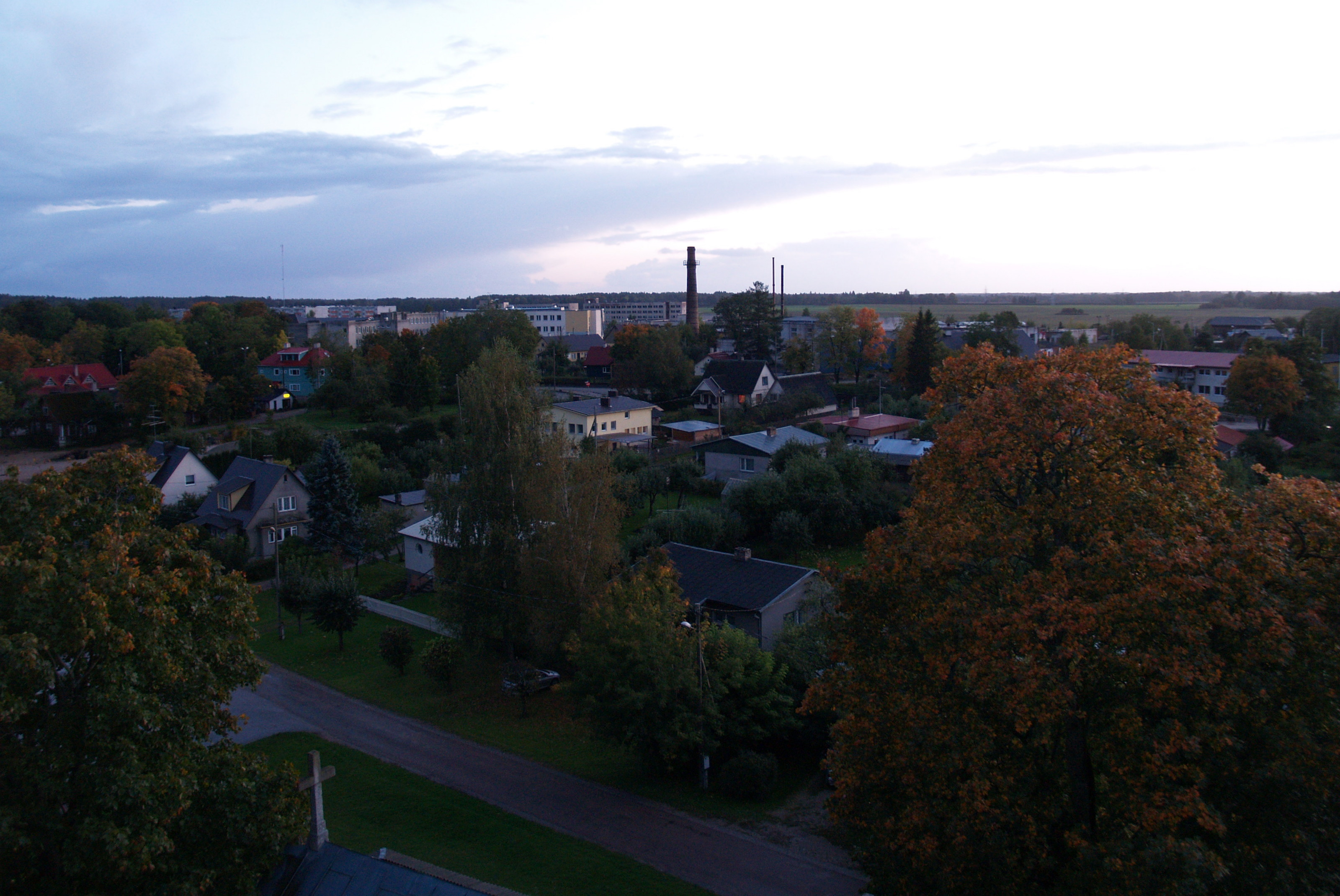
View at Kose

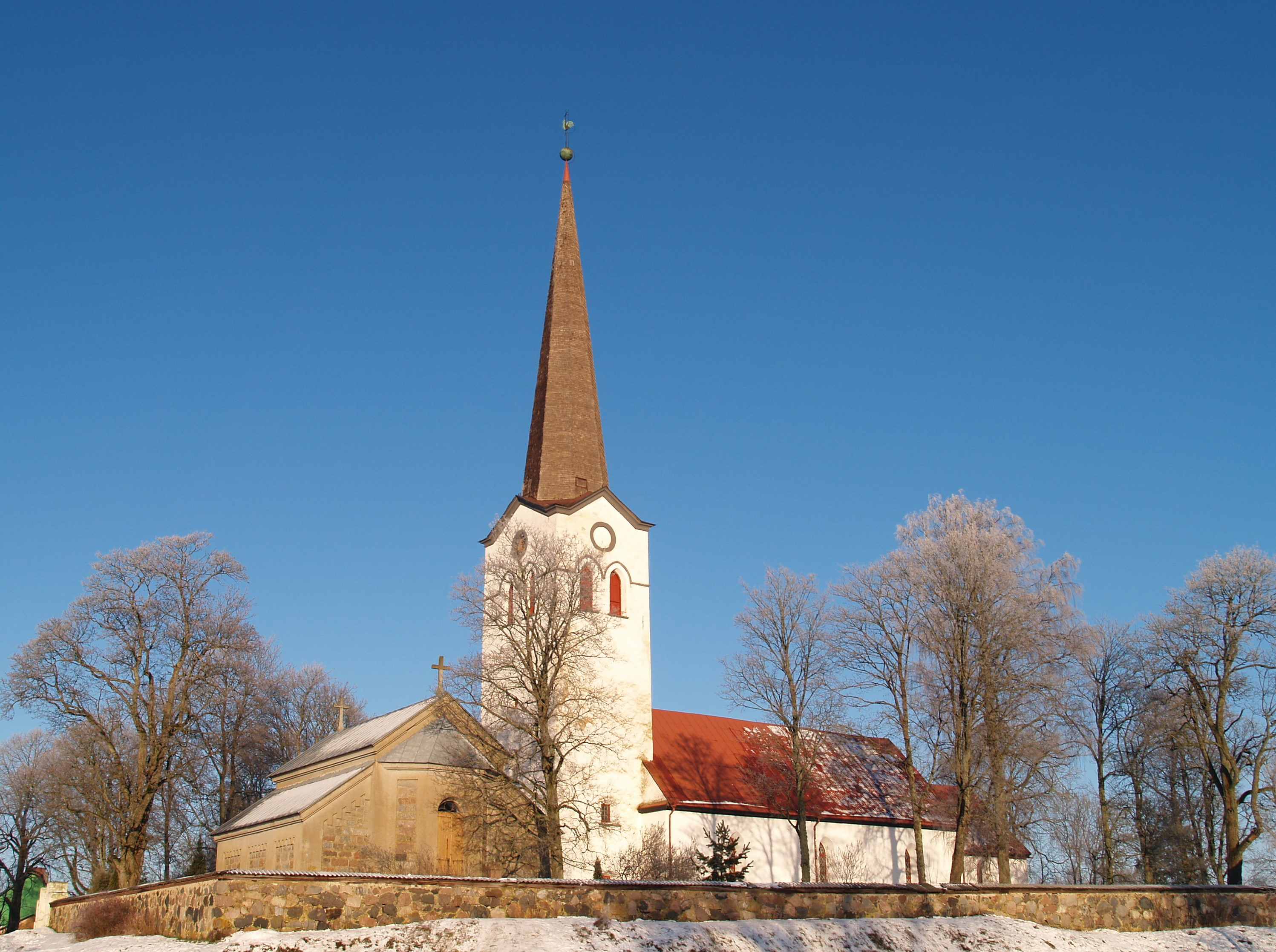
Kose church

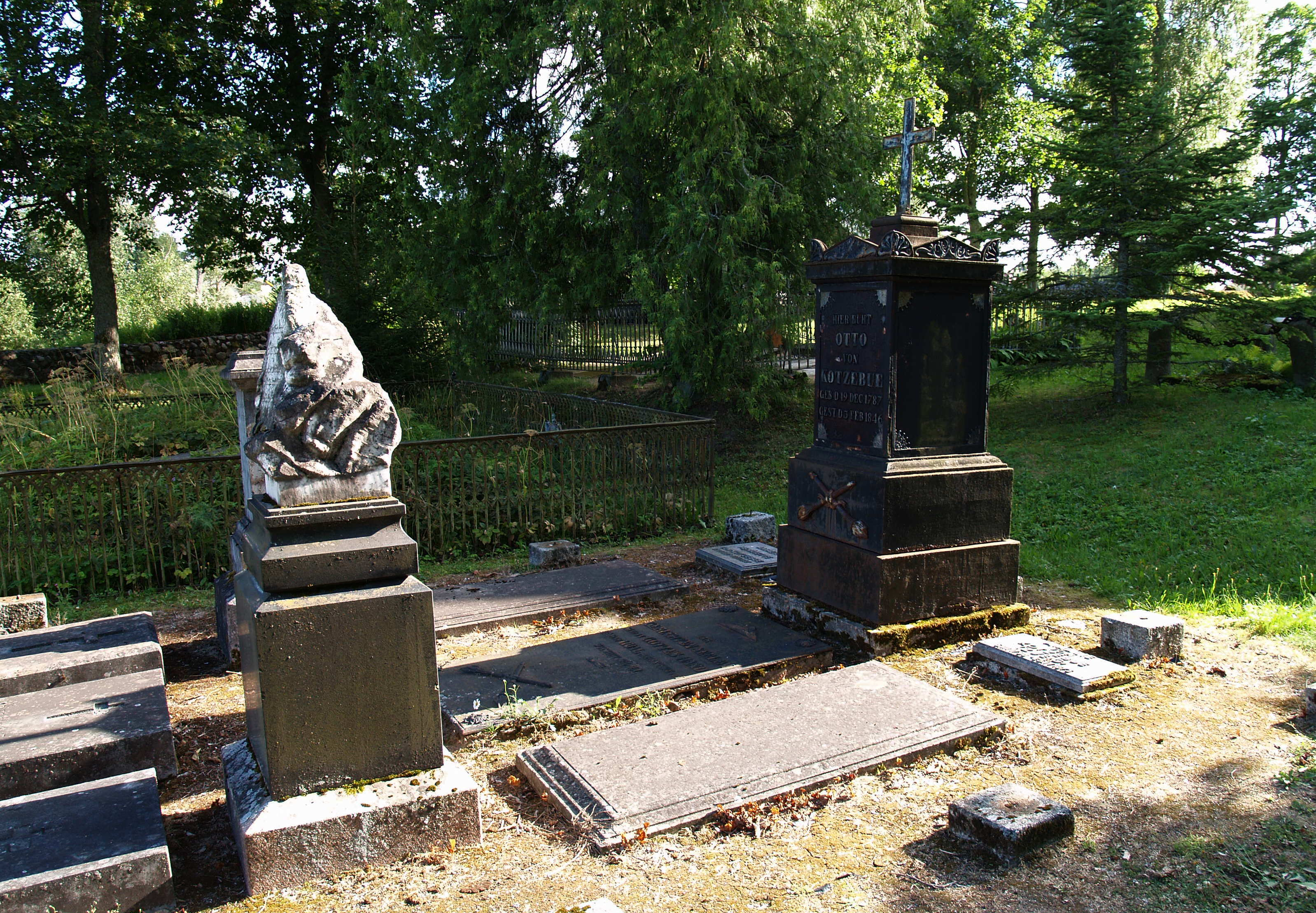
Grave of navigator Otto von Kotzebue

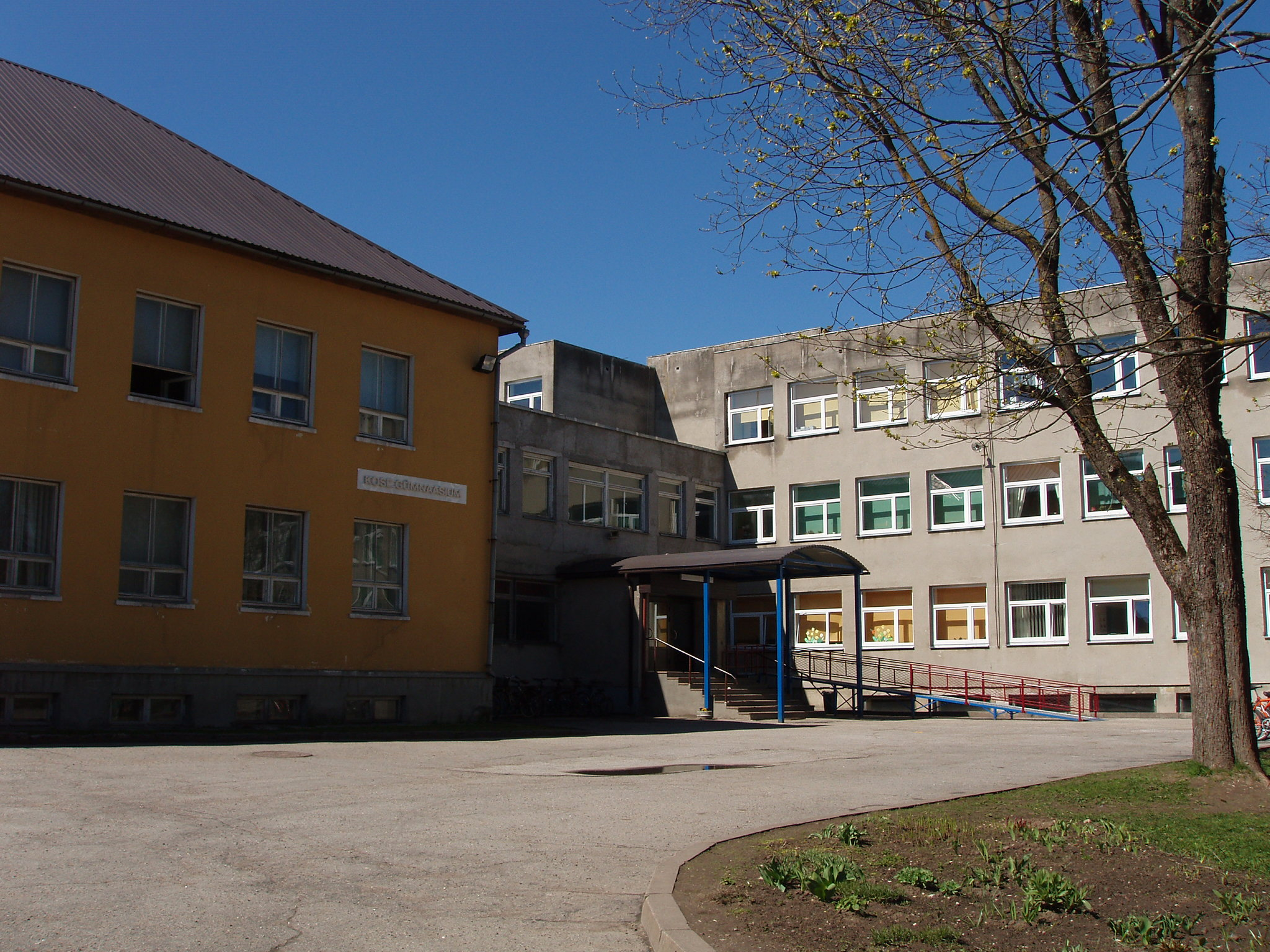
Kose Gymnasium

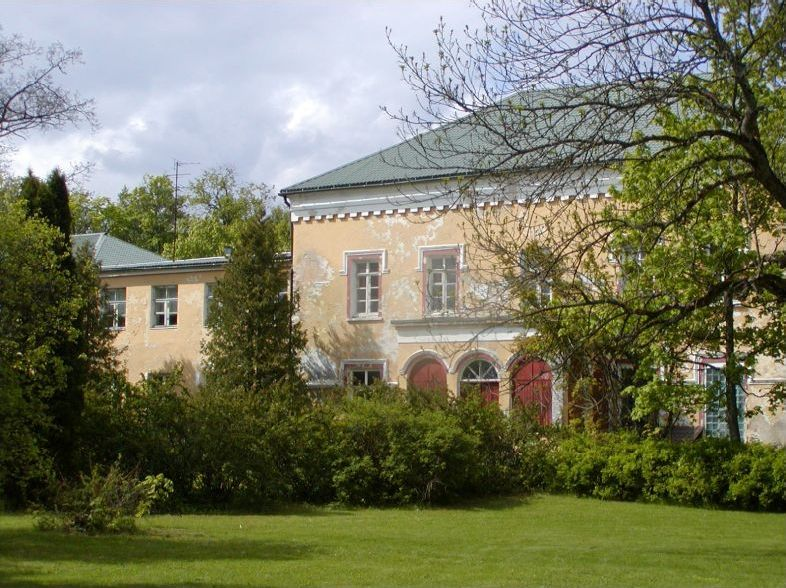
Kose-Uuemõisa Manor

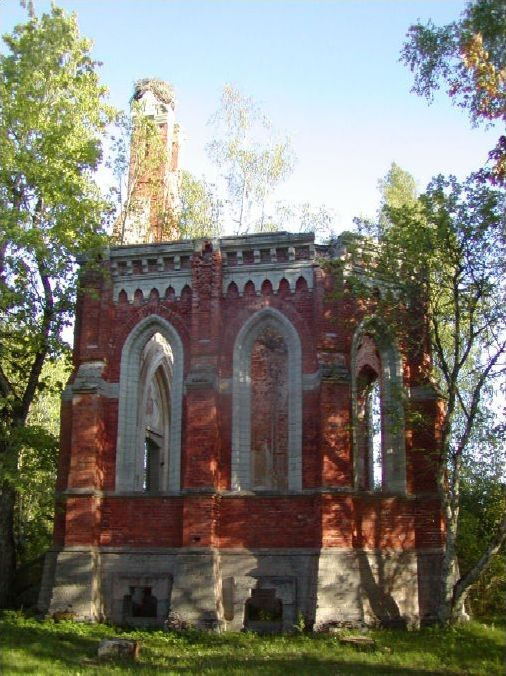
Ruins of Kose-Uuemõisa chapel

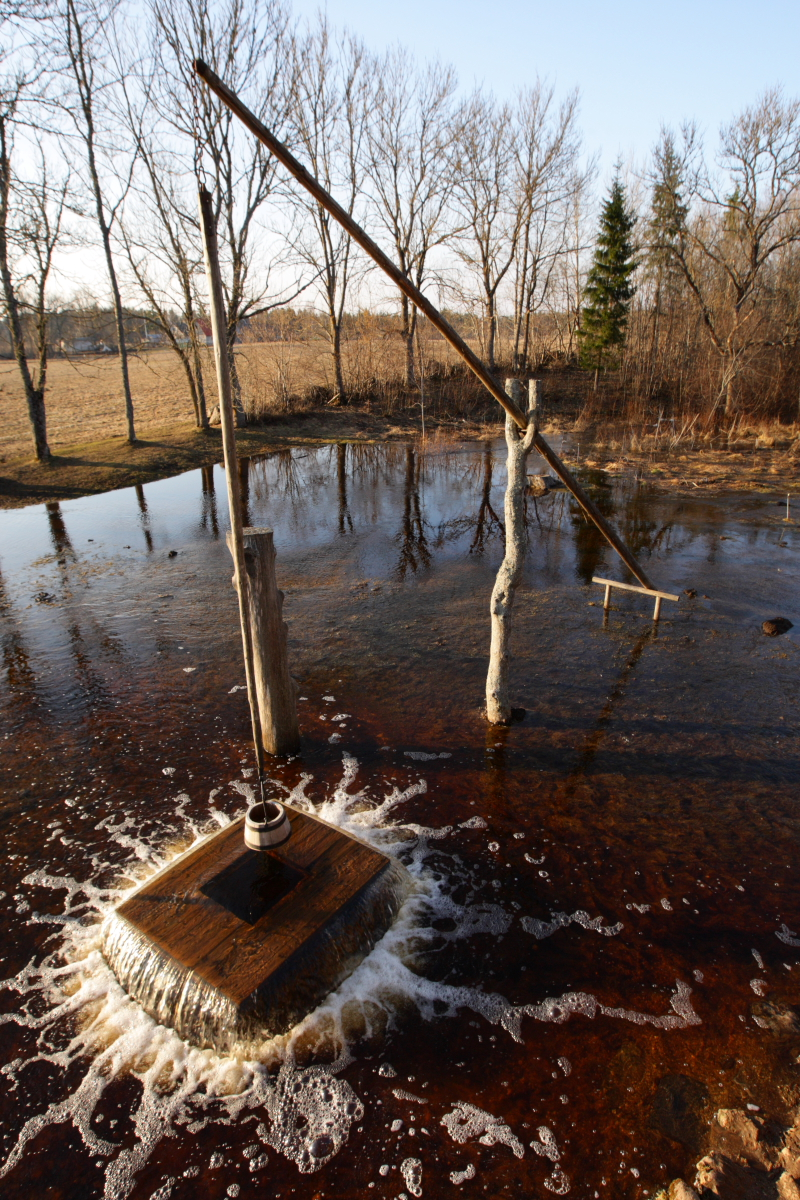
Tuhala Witch's well

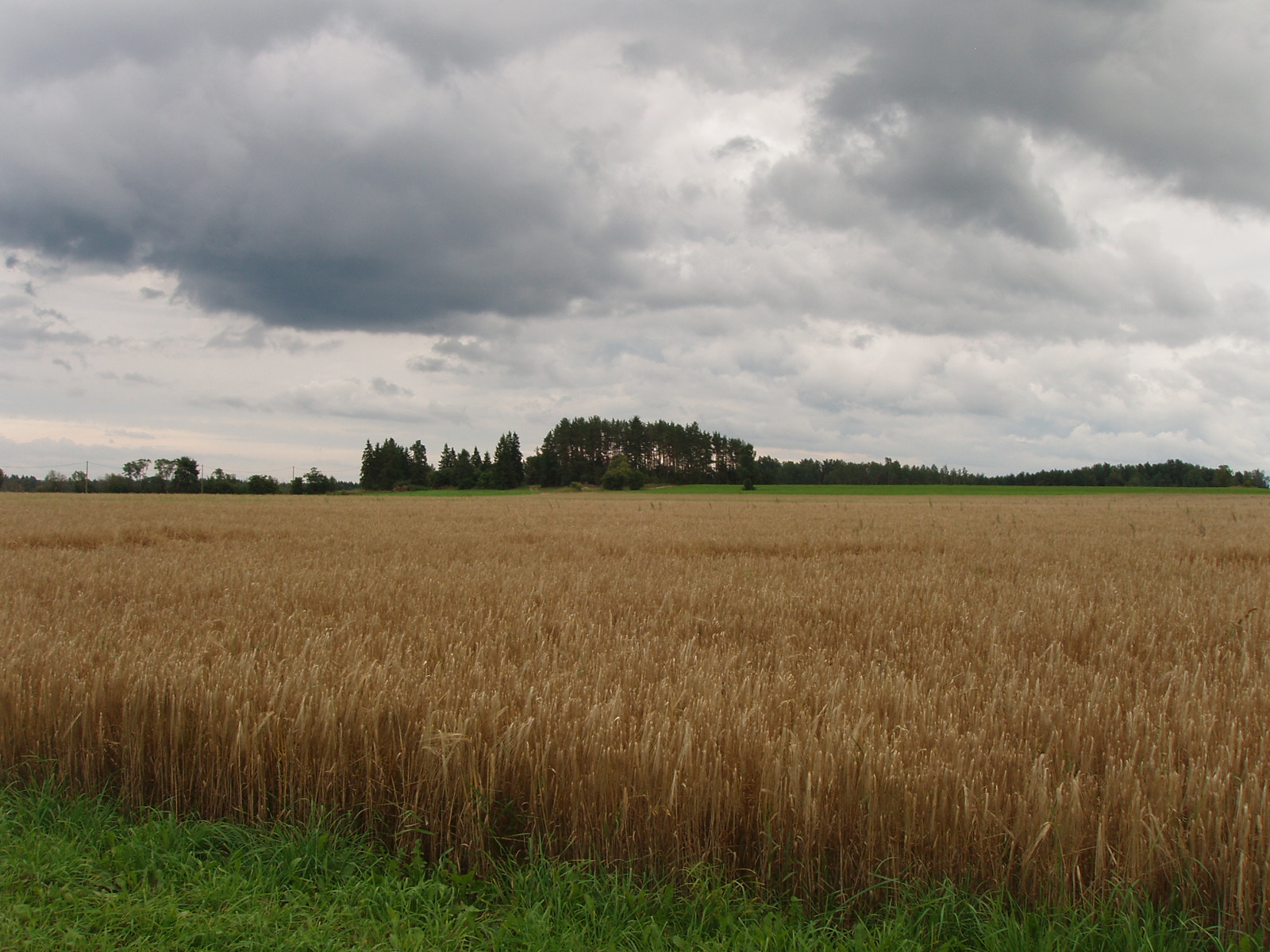
Landscape in Vilama

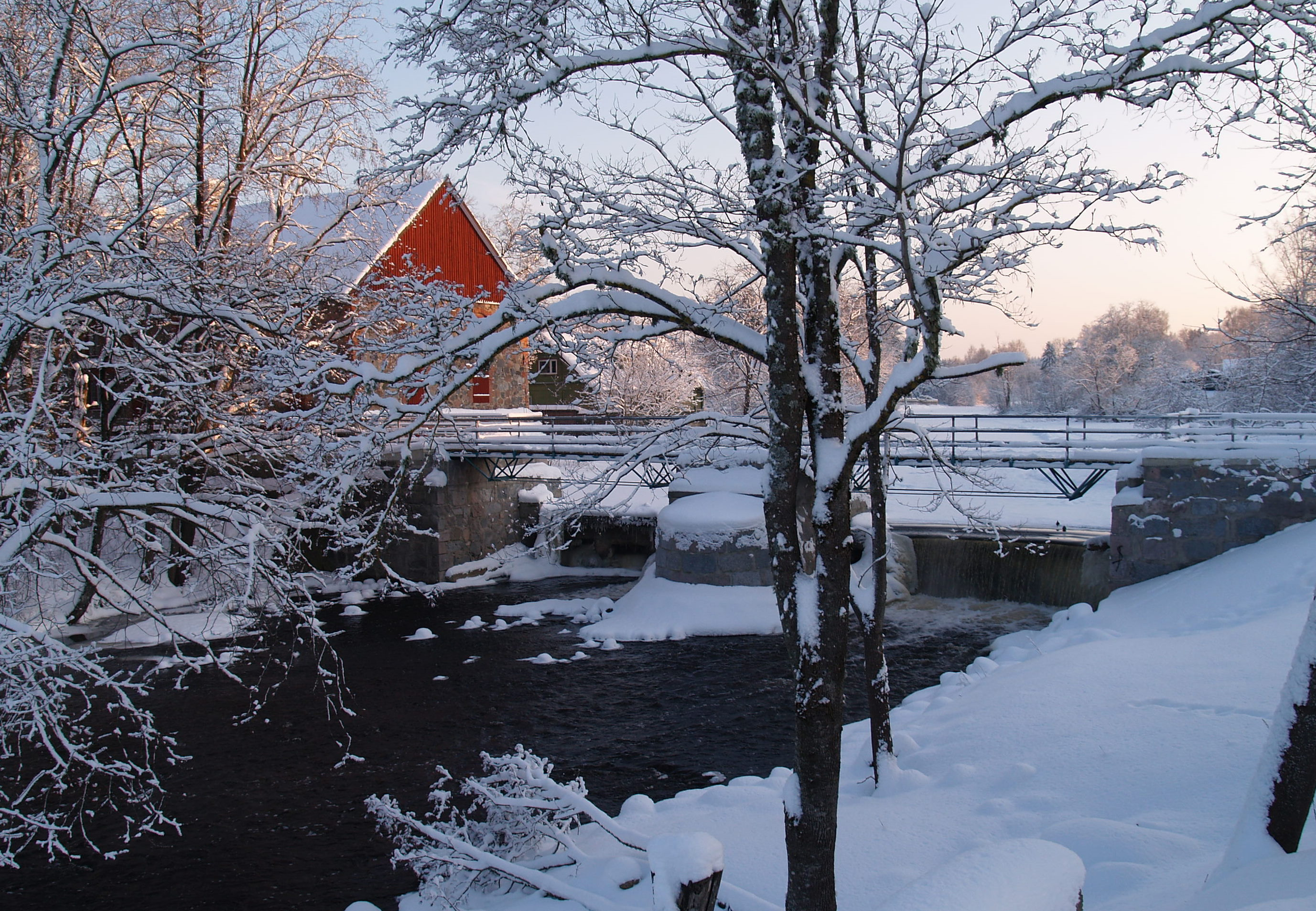
Pirita River in Kose

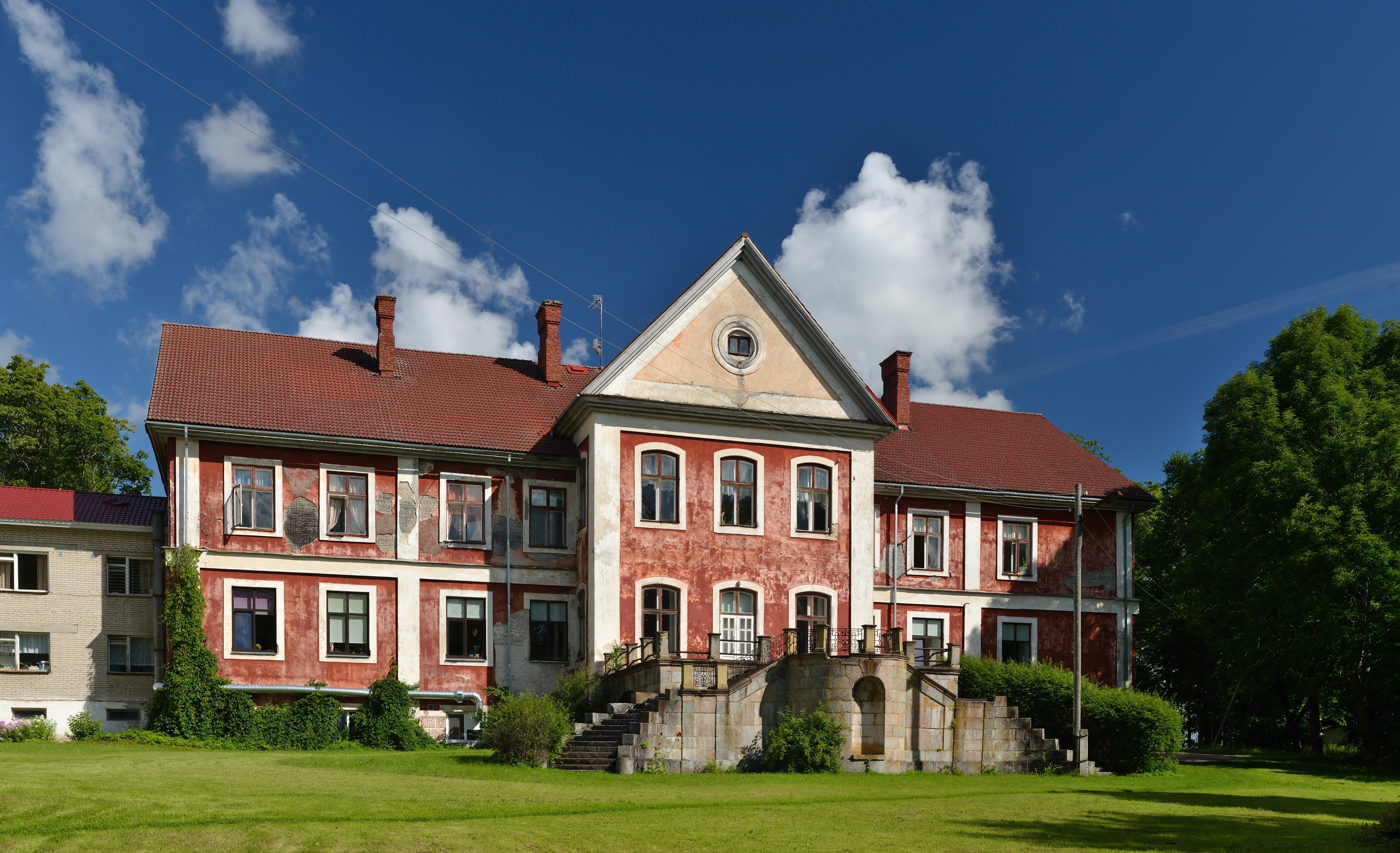
Ravila manor

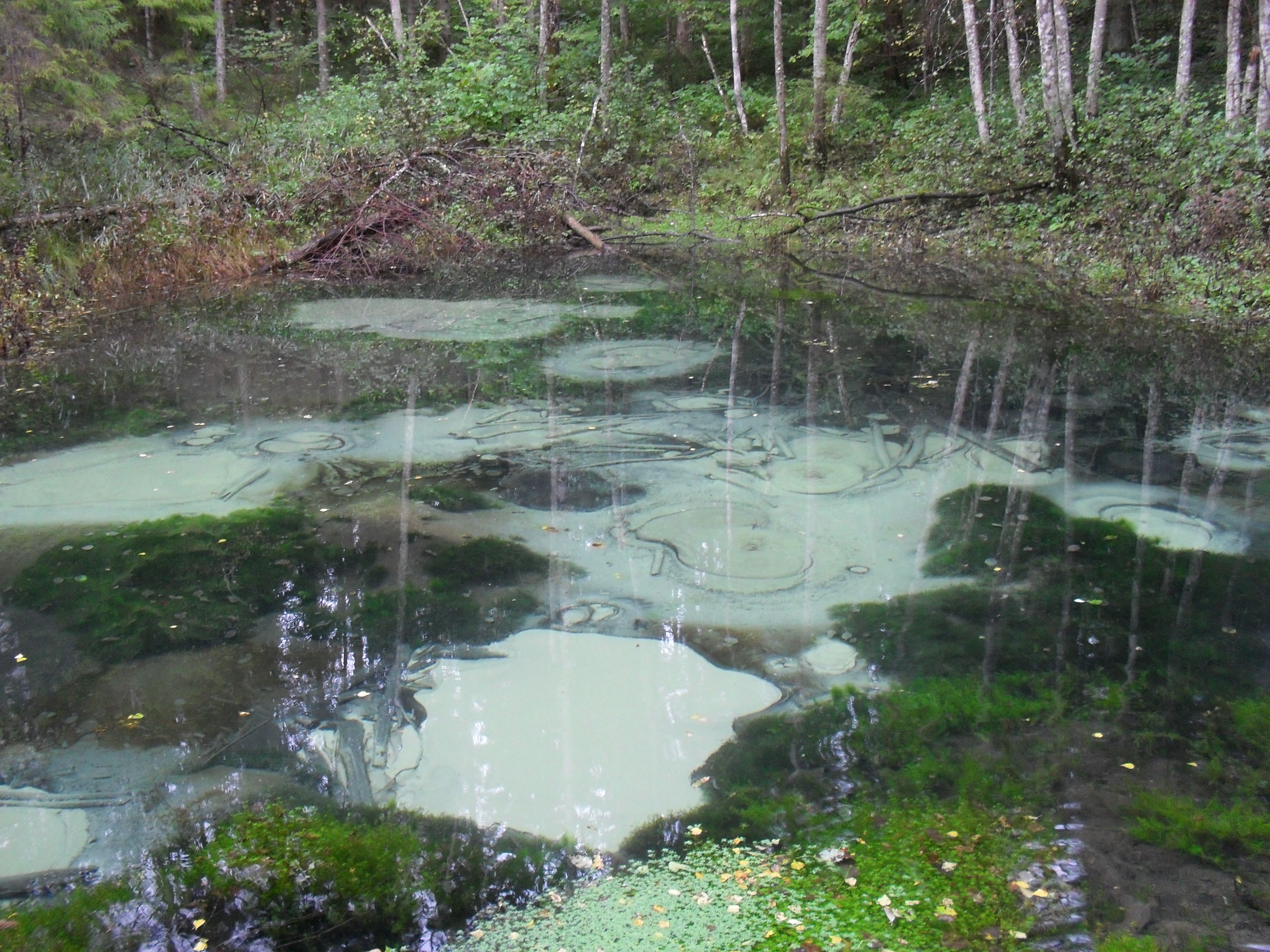
Saula Blue Springs

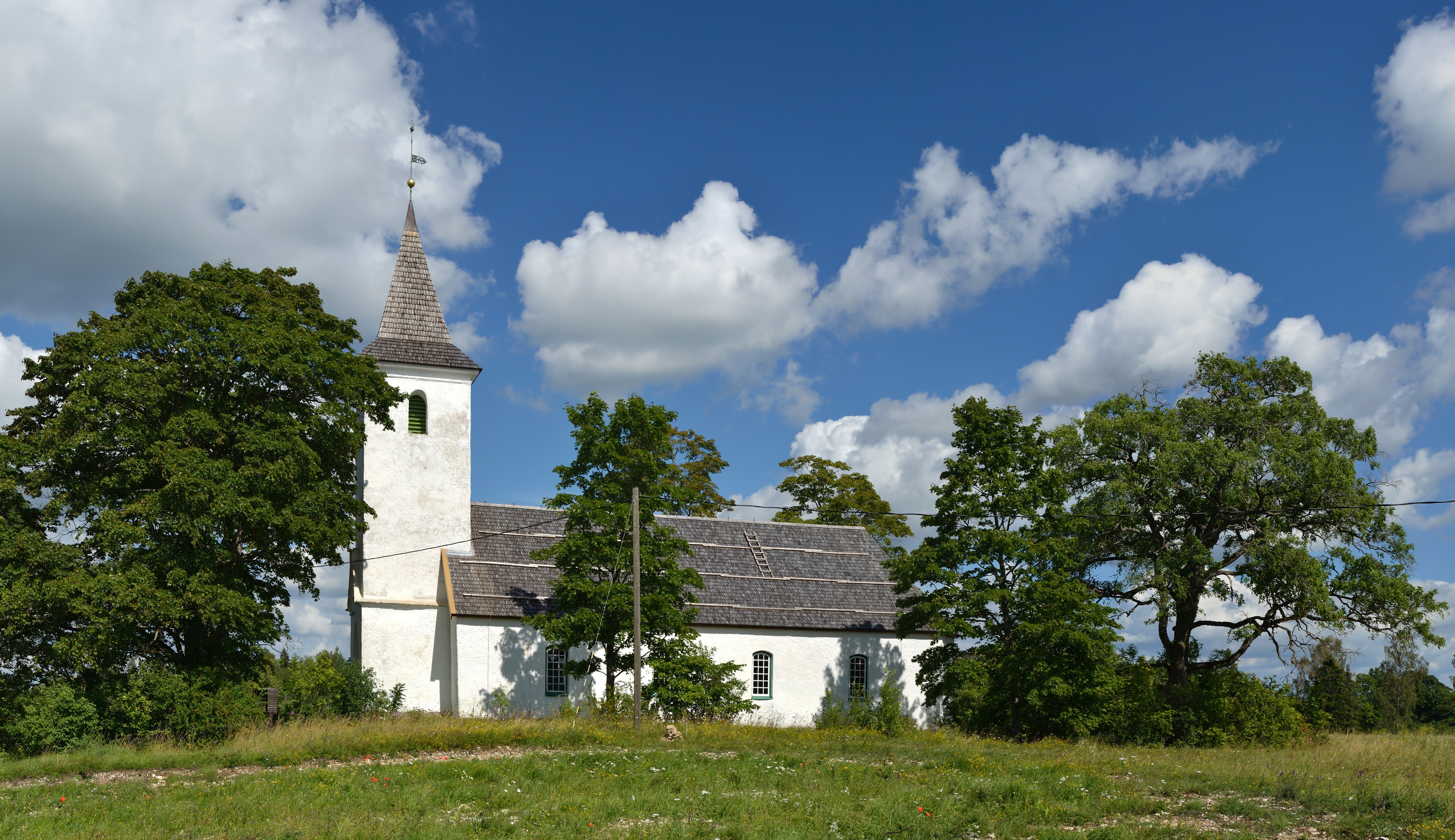
Tuhala church

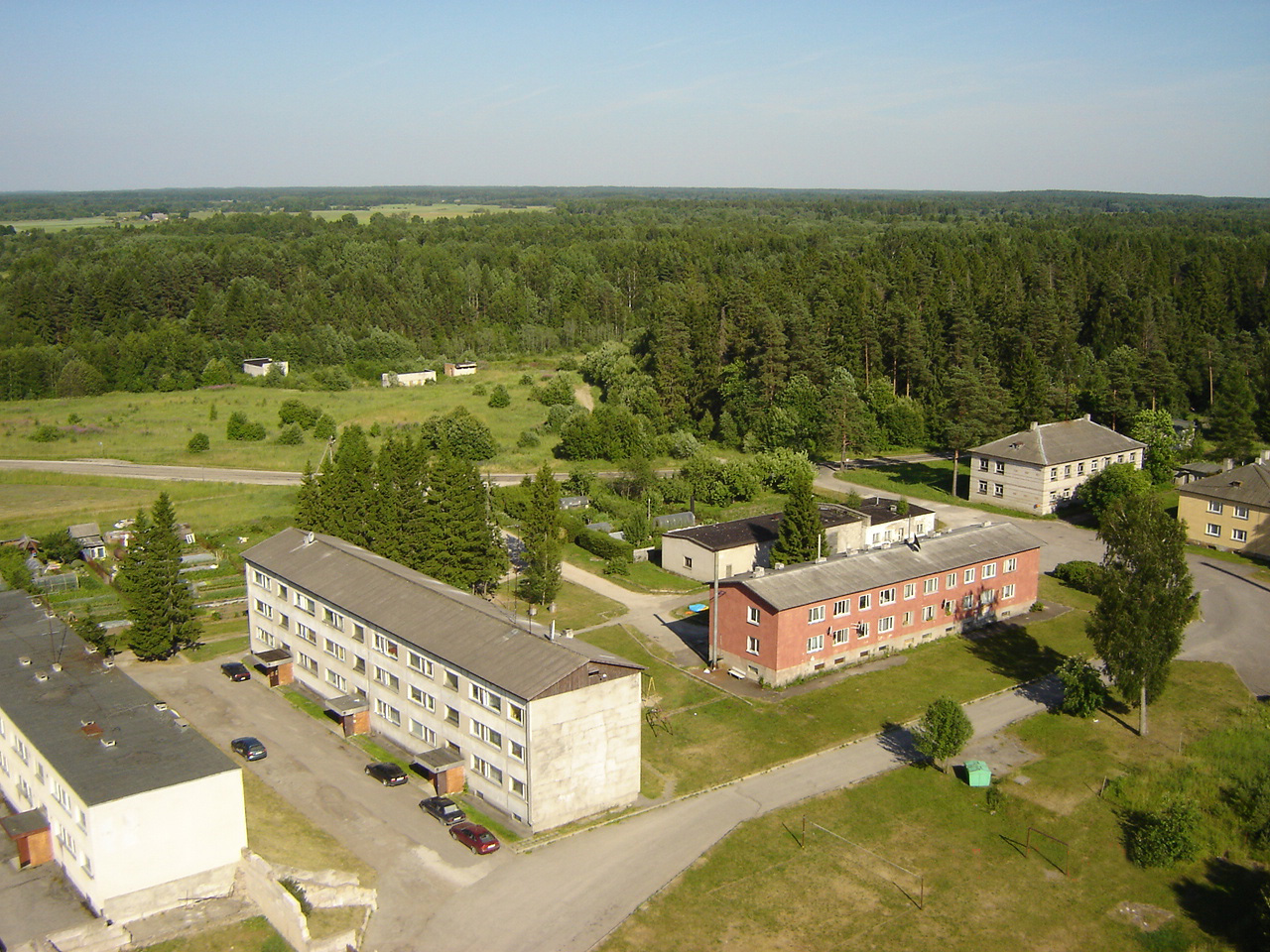
Vardja

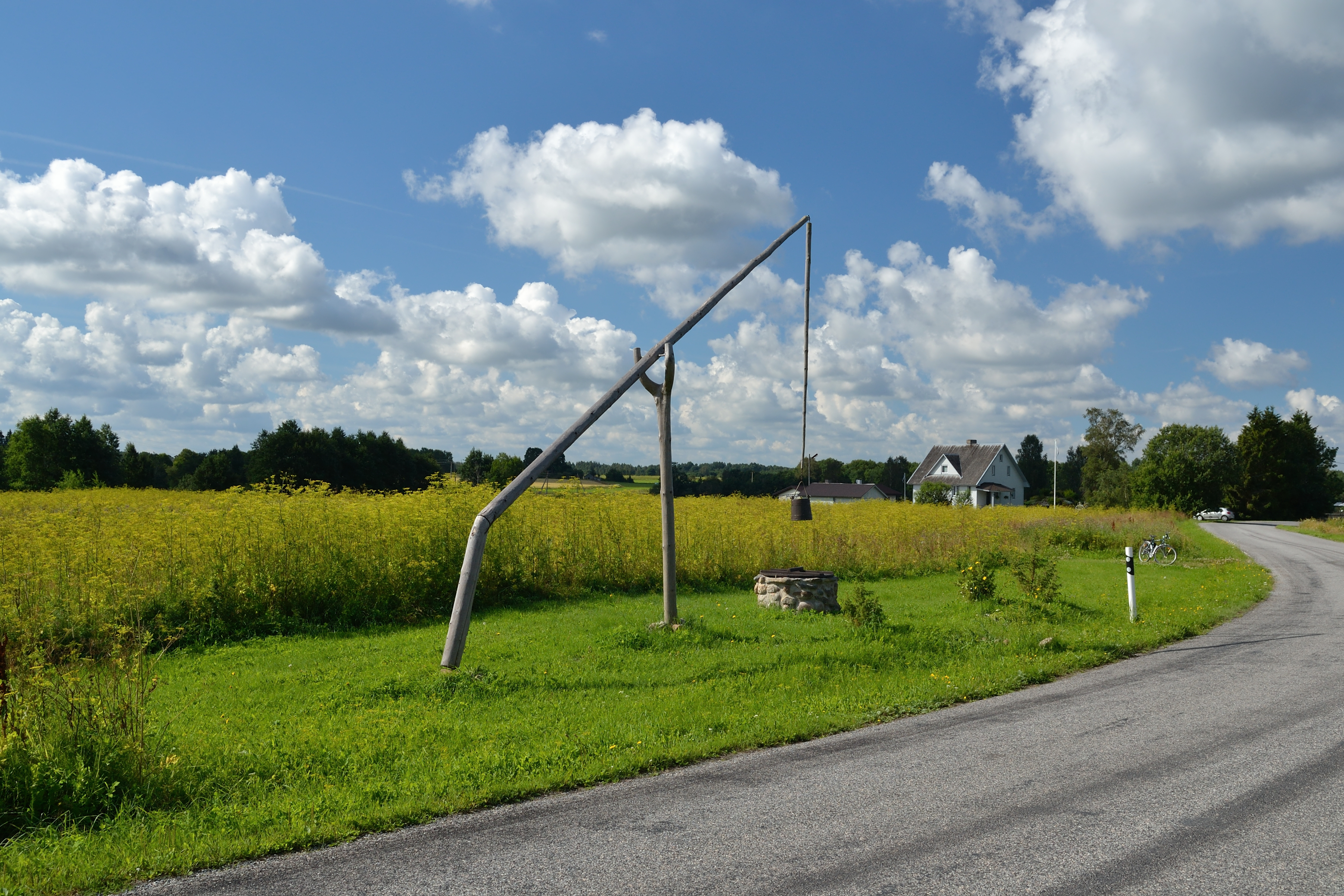
Võlle

== See also ==
- Blue Springs of Saula
