= Kuivajõe =

Village in Estonia

Coordinates: 59°10′N 25°07′E

- Village
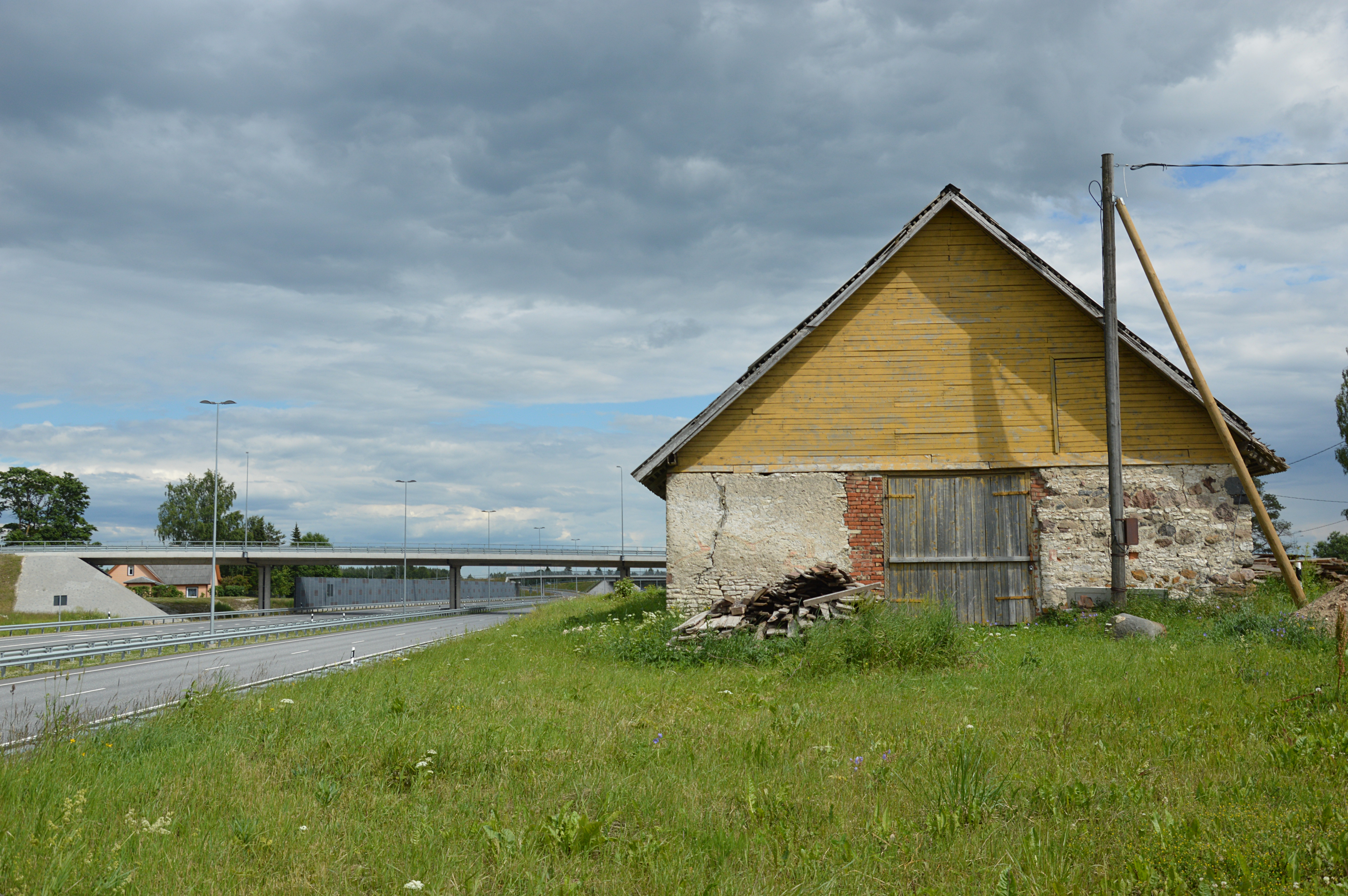
- Interactive map of Kuivajõe
- Country: Estonia
- County: Harju County
- Parish: Kose Parish
- Time zone: UTC+2 (EET)
  - Summer (DST): UTC+3 (EEST)

Kuivajõe is a village in Kose Parish, Harju County, northern Estonia.
