= Kose-Uuemõisa =

Borough in Estonia

- Small borough
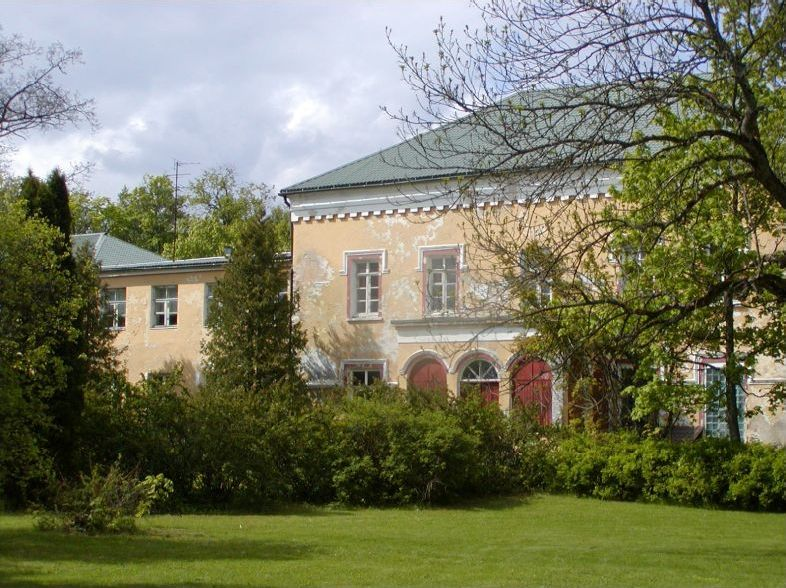
- Kose-Uuemõisa Manor

- Location in Estonia
- Coordinates: 59°12′18″N 25°06′13″E
- Country: Estonia
- County: Harju County
- Municipality: Kose Parish

Kose-Uuemõisa (German: Neuenhof) is a small borough (alevik) in Kose Parish, Harju County, northern Estonia.

== Kose-Uuemõisa Manor ==
The village has been the location of a manor house since the 1340s, although the medieval building burned down during the Livonian War. The current building, in neo-Renaissance style, dates from the 1850s and was erected by the Baltic German family von Uexküll. The von Uexküll family burial chapel, built in 1905, still stands in the park adjacent to the manor house. It is built in an artistically accomplished neo-Gothic style.

== See also ==
- List of palaces and manor houses in Estonia
