= Jaan Künnap =

Estonian alpinist (born 1948)

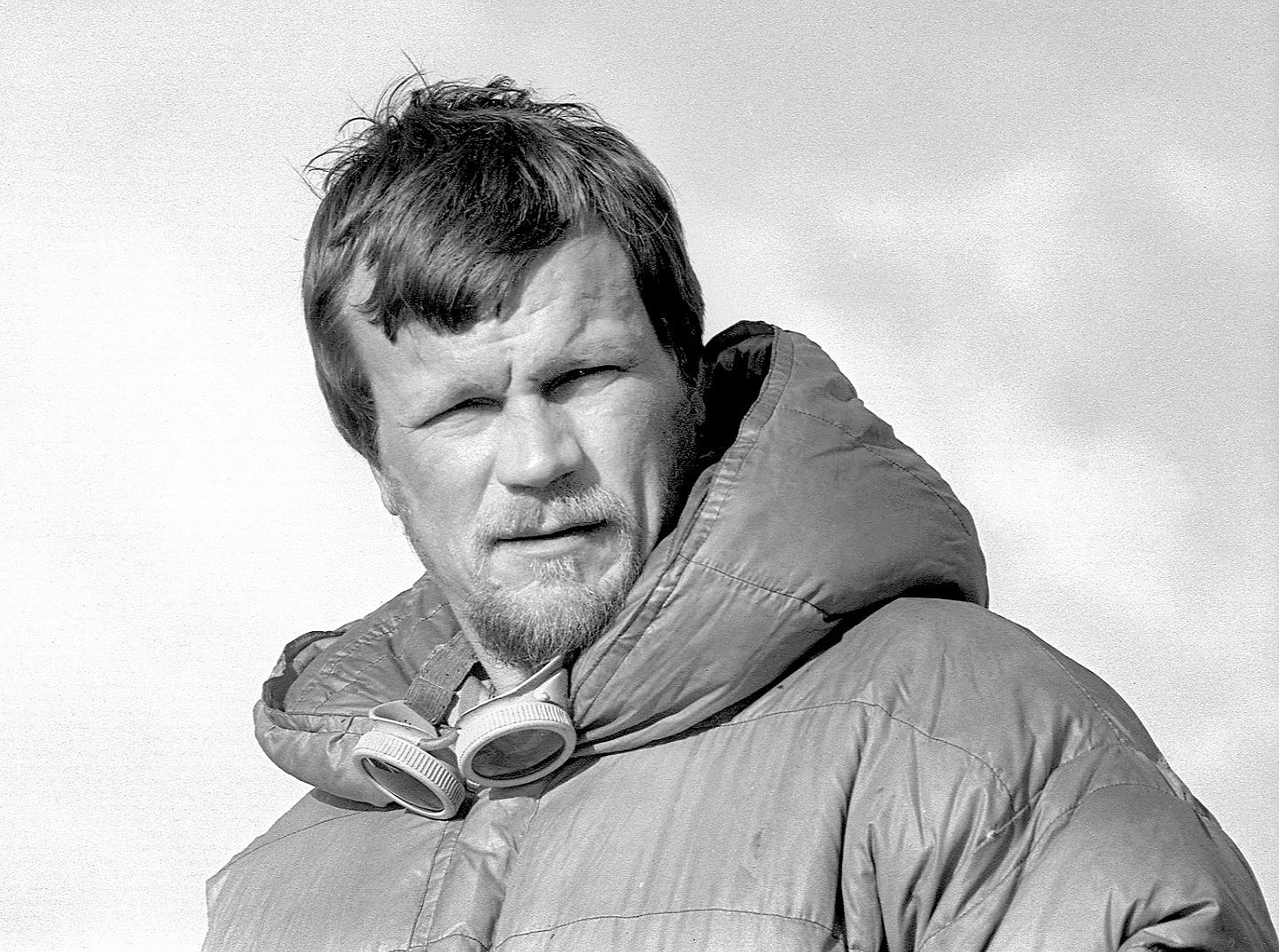
Künnap in 1982

Jaan Künnap (born 9 February 1948, in Kõue) is an Estonian mountaineer, photographer, and sports coach.

== Biography ==
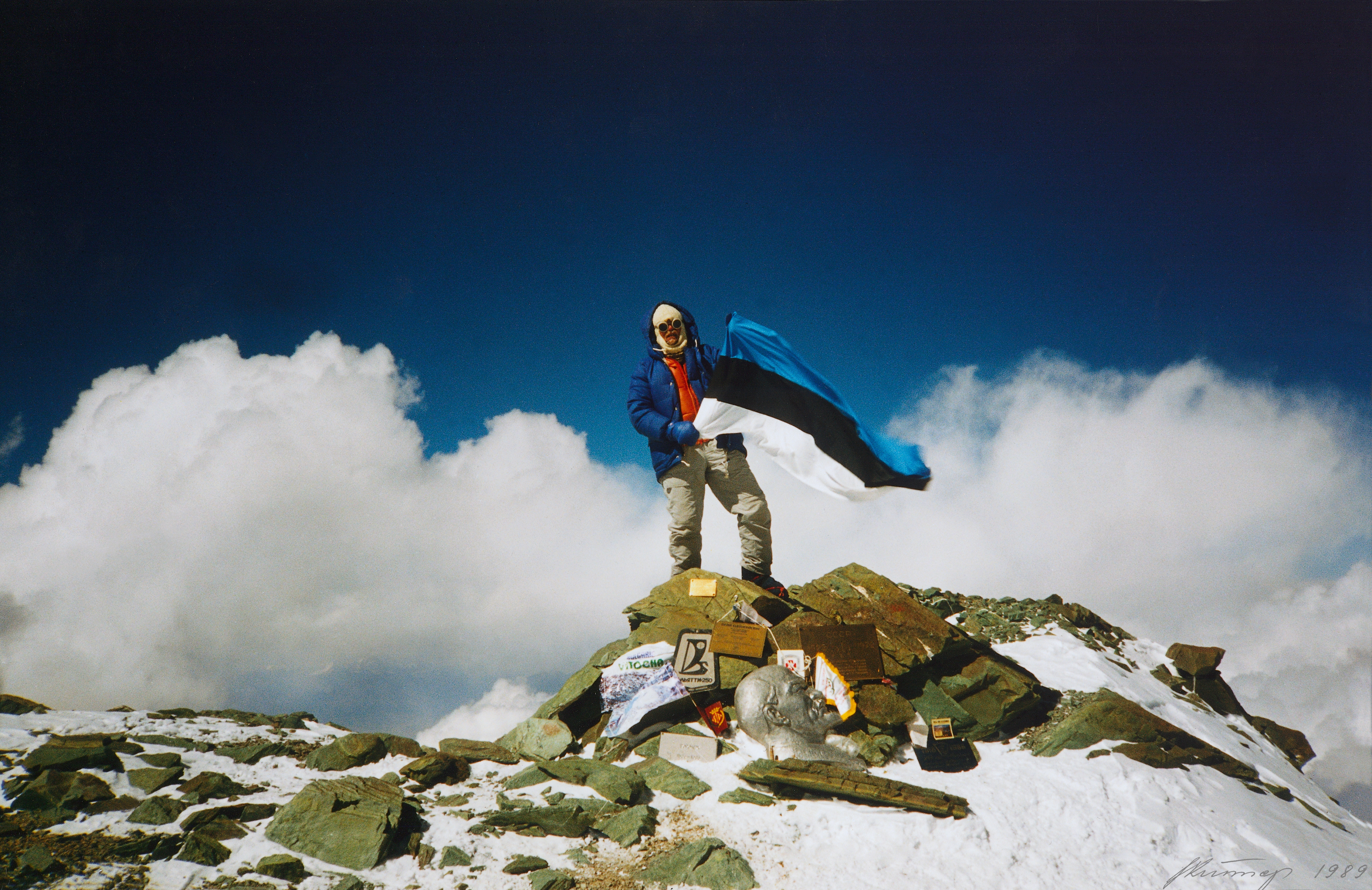
Künnap on top of Lenin Peak (7134 m)

Künnap went to school in Kose, as well as in Tallinn, where he has lived since 1969. He completed Tallinn's adult evening gymnasium in 1978, a school for mountaineering instructors in 1984, and a school for mountain rescuers in 1985.

From 1971 to 1994 he worked as a deep-sea diver on a rescue ship. During this time he logged over 3,000 hours of diving time and recorded depths of up to 80 m. At 80 meters underwater, the pressure is around eight atmospheres; at the roughly seven-kilometre mountain altitudes he has climbed to, it is about a third of sea-level pressure. Künnap has said he used to boast to friends about his 80-meter dives, until a friend who had worked in a Siberian mine 1.5 kilometres underground mentioned his own depth.

Künnap has not married. Asked about this on Estonian public radio, he said that during his years as a rescuer, he saw little point tying himself to someone so completely, since he could never be sure how his own work would turn out; he added that things had gone well for him regardless. He has two daughters, including Helen Künnap.

== Mountaineering ==
He has climbed to the peak of over 150 mountains. Künnap received the Snow Leopard award in 1987. In 1999, a film was made about him with the same name (Lumeleopard; 1999). He was the president of the Tallinn Alpinism Club between 1983 and 1988 and since 1999 he has led the mountaineering club that bears his name.

On August 7, 1979, a close climbing companion of Künnap's died in a mountain accident; Künnap survived. He has said fellow climber Vigala Sass told him afterward that he could now climb without worry, since he clearly was not going to die in the mountains.

=== First ascent of 6,000 meters ===
In 1982, he took part in an expedition to the Tanõmas mountain range in central Pamiri to celebrate the 350th anniversary of the University of Tartu. In the course of this, the highest unconquered mountain of the Soviet Union at that time was first conquered − Tartu Ülikool 350 (the name of the University of Tartu and the height of the peak was thought to be 6350 m). The expedition was led by Kalev Muru and six climbers reached the top, including Jaan Künnap (ascension leader).

In 1984, the Estonians again visited the Pamiri to conquer the peaks. At an altitude of 6047 meters, the top was climbed by three groups on different routes. The ascension group, led by Jaan Künnap, reached its peak on August 18 (the day before, the group led by Ilmar Priimetsa reached the top). The peak was called the Tallinn Peak.

He has climbed to the top of several seven-thousanders (and in the case of some of them, like Ismoil Somoni Peak, he has successfully summited several times). He has technically climbed over 8,000 m; however, he has not successfully reached the summit of an eight-thousander. During his climb of Cho Oyu, the eight-thousander he has climbed, he went above 8,000 m, but started coming down before reaching the top.

== Photography ==
Künnap began working in photography in 1972, around the same time he took up mountaineering. He has participated in over 50 photography exhibitions and has reached the podium in numerous photography competitions. He has held 53 solo exhibitions since 1982, including "People's Land" (1984), "Mountains and People" (1986), "Color Photographs from the Mountains" (1995), and "Panoramas" (2010), and has taken part in joint exhibitions in 18 countries, including Spain, Germany, and Denmark. He won a bronze medal at the "Fotosport" exhibition in Spain in 1986 and a certificate of honor at "Venus '88" in Kraków. He has written two books and served as a camera operator for several documentaries. Since 1998, he has worked as a photographer for the Tallinn City Museum.

Künnap estimates he has taken around a million photographs over his career. By 2023, he had donated over 2,000 images to Wikimedia Commons out of roughly 200,000 preserved negatives he plans eventually to give to Estonia's National Archives. He has also added thousands of photos to Wikimedia Commons and was selected as the best Wikiphotograper of the Year 2019 & 2020 & 2023 in Estonia.

In July 2025, Künnap published an autobiography, Mitu elu on parem kui üks ("Several Lives Are Better Than One"), written with Sirje Presnal and containing more than 500 photographs drawn from his career. Künnap said the book focuses mainly on extreme situations he has survived rather than on family life: "it isn't a very easy book — there's too much talk of corpses in it, but that's what my life has been like." Postimees critic Andres Laasik reviewed the book, calling Künnap one of Estonia's most important documentarians and noting that, unlike his earlier practical handbooks and his photo album Fotograafia minu elus, the new book combines his photographs with a narrative account of his life.

== Awards ==
In 1987, he received the Snow Leopard award together with Kalev Muru and Alfred Lõhmus.

In 2001, he was honored with the 3rd class of the Order of the Estonian Red Cross, the first Estonian alpinist to receive it; as of 2025 only three alpinists have.

== Works ==
=== Photos ===
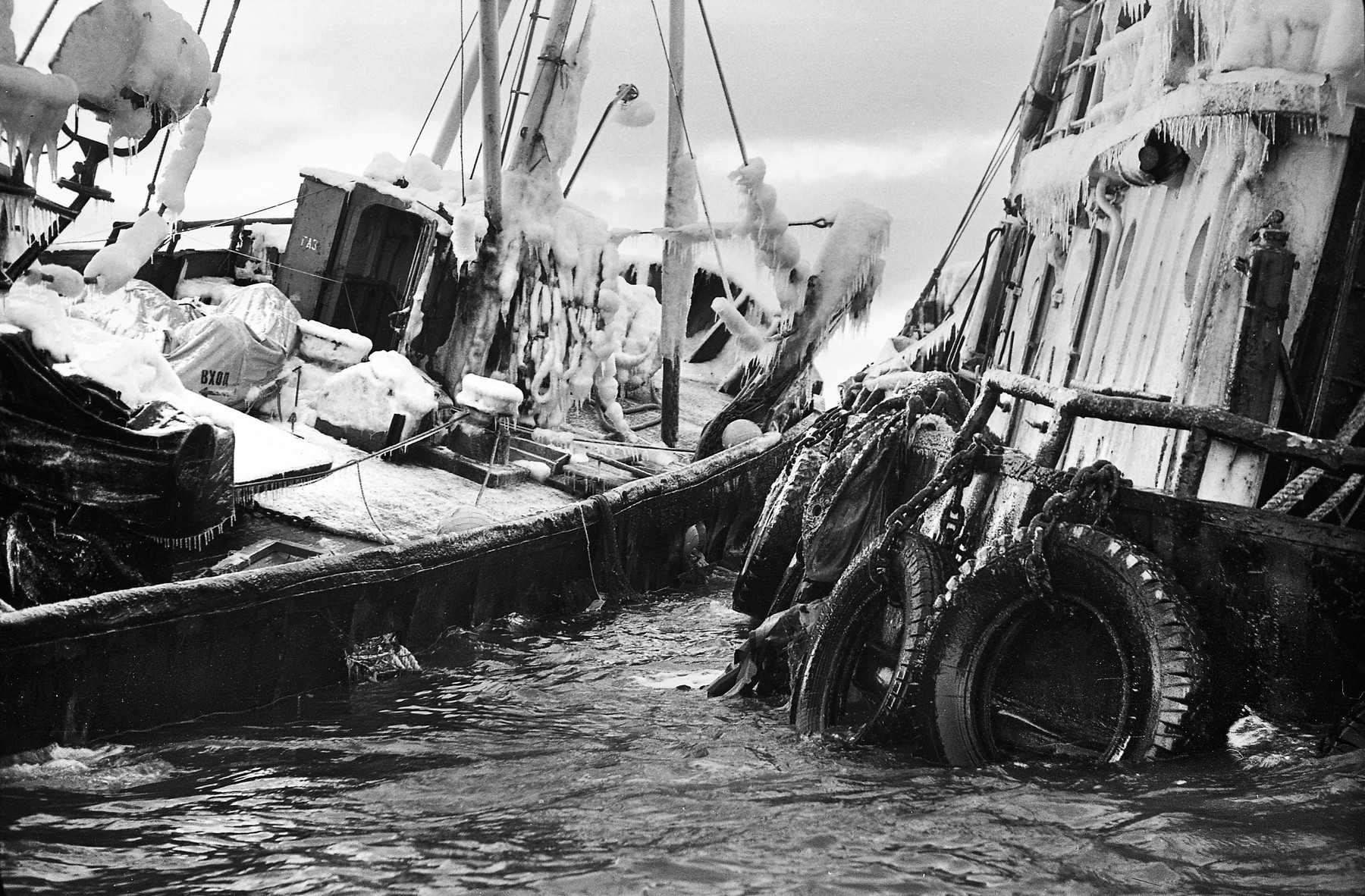
Marine salvage in Estonia in 1973

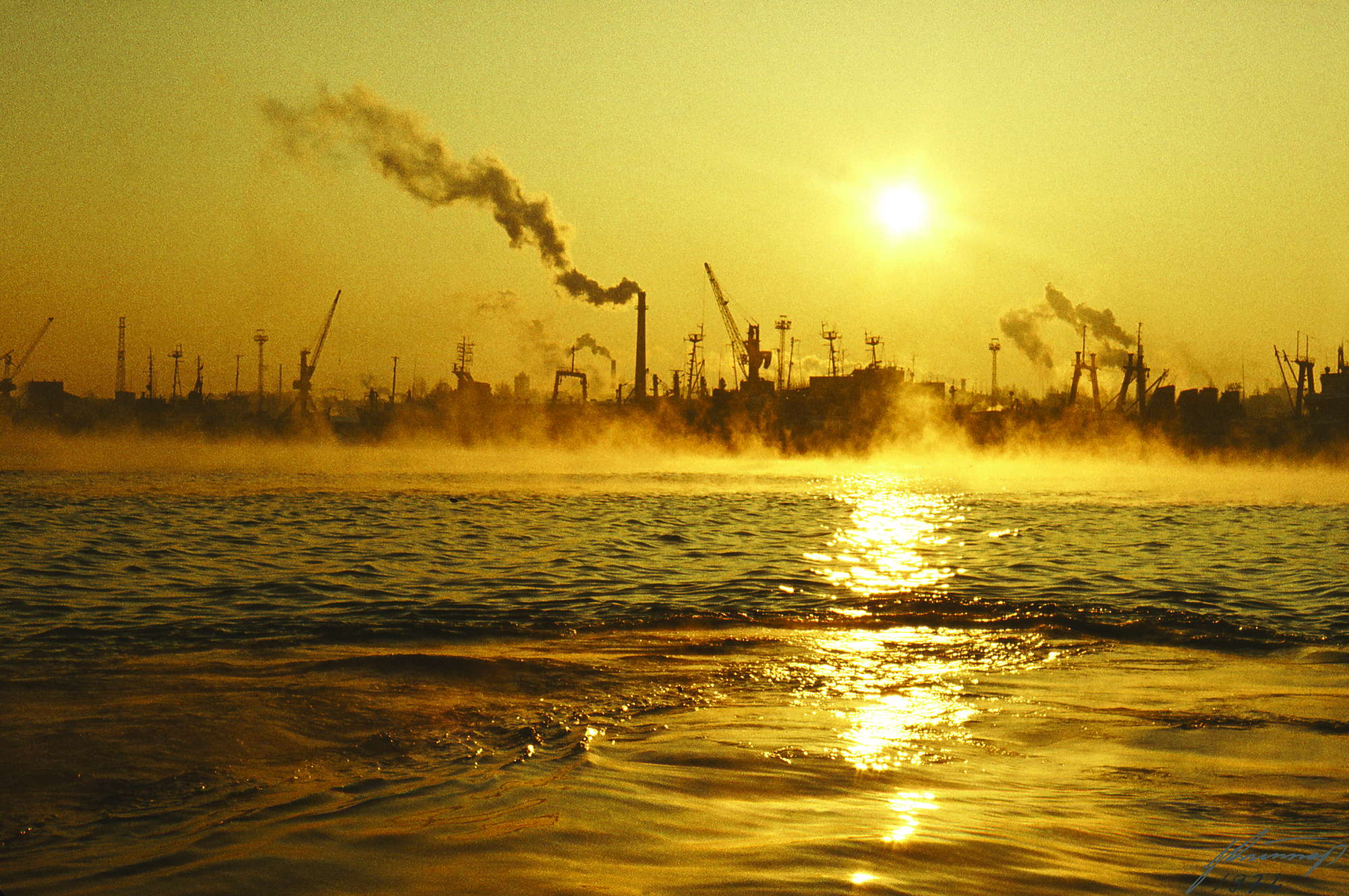
Paljassaare Harbour (1974)

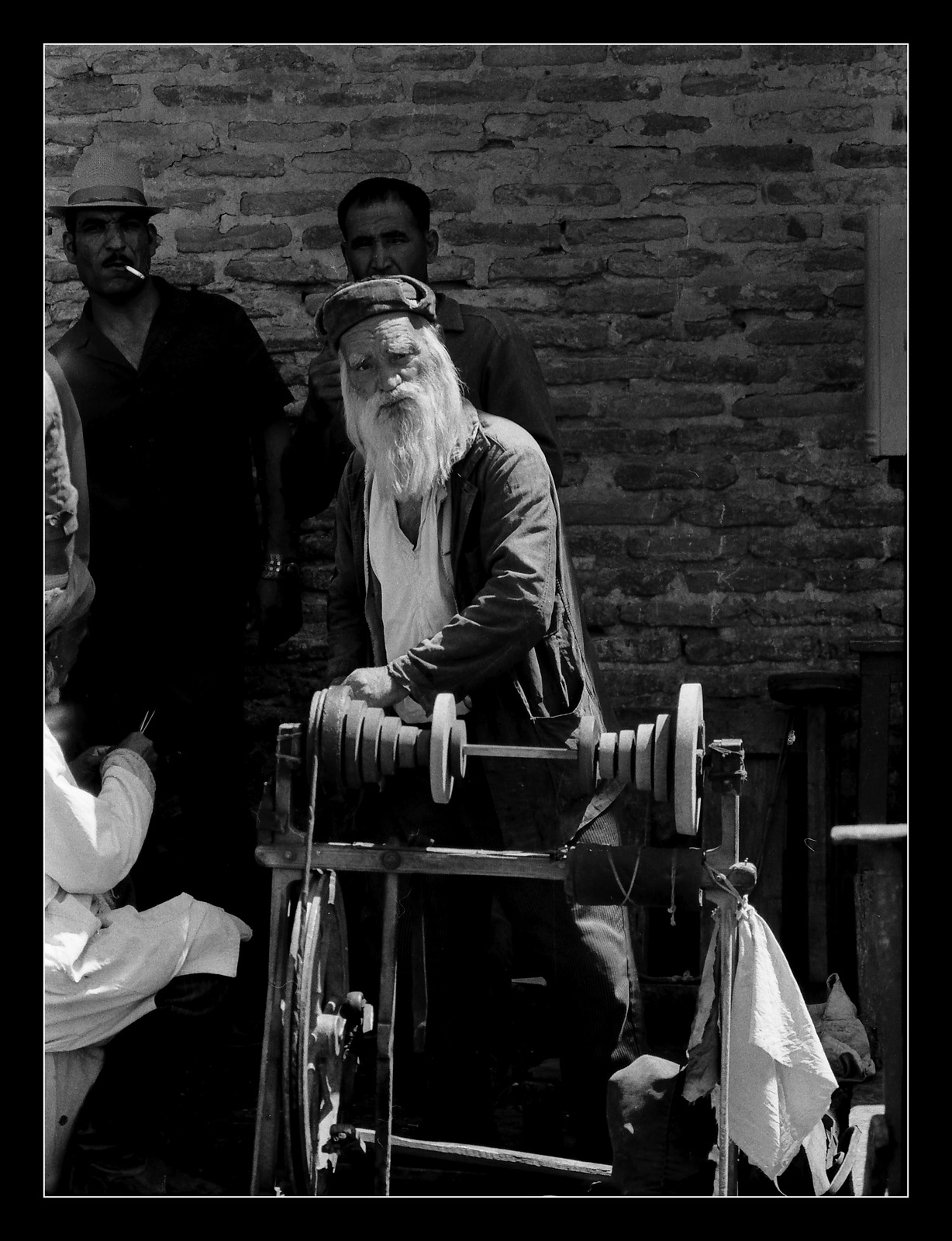
"Käiaja" (Grinder; 1977)

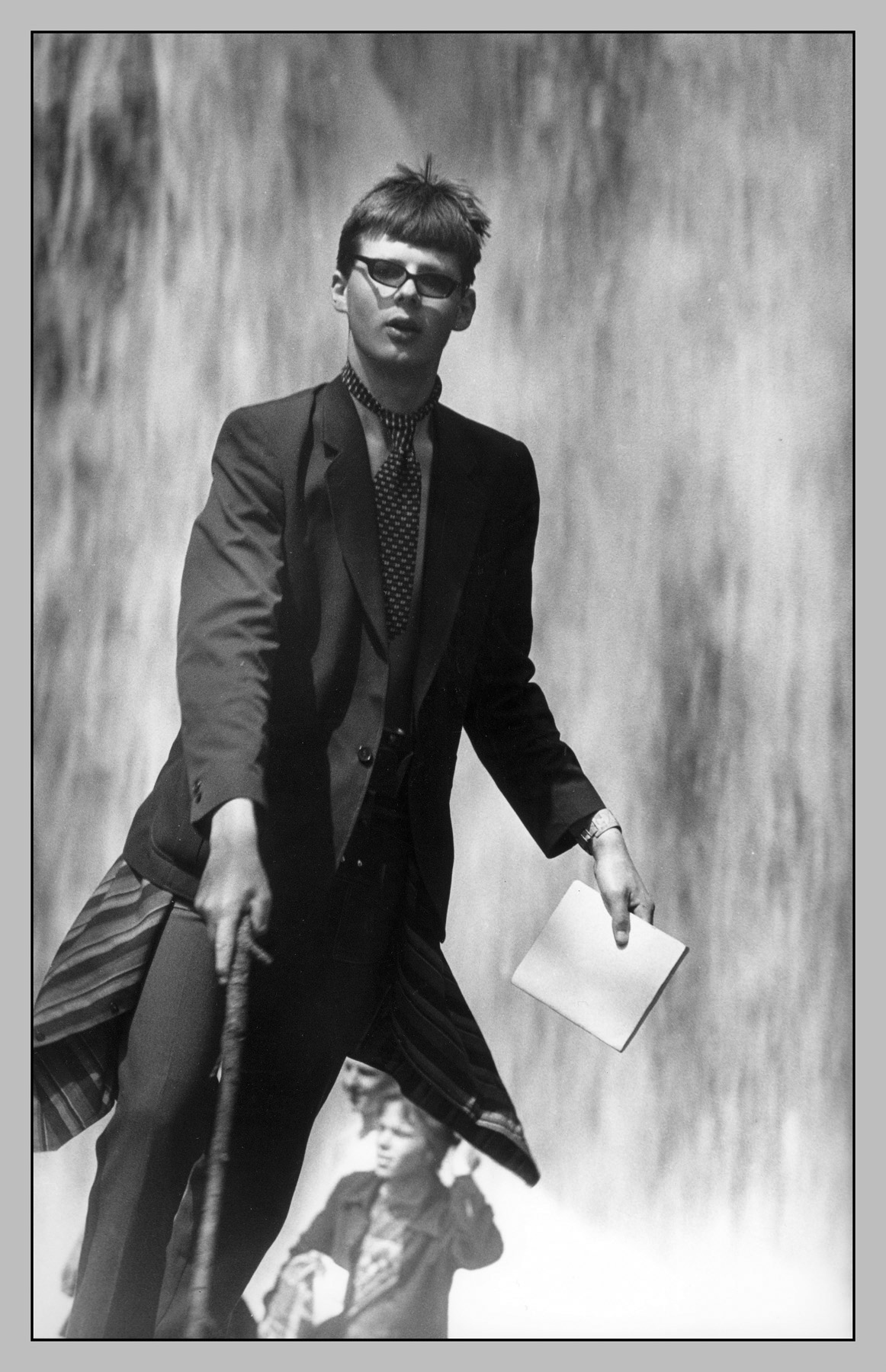
"Tormide, tungide aastad" (Years of storms and urges; 1981)

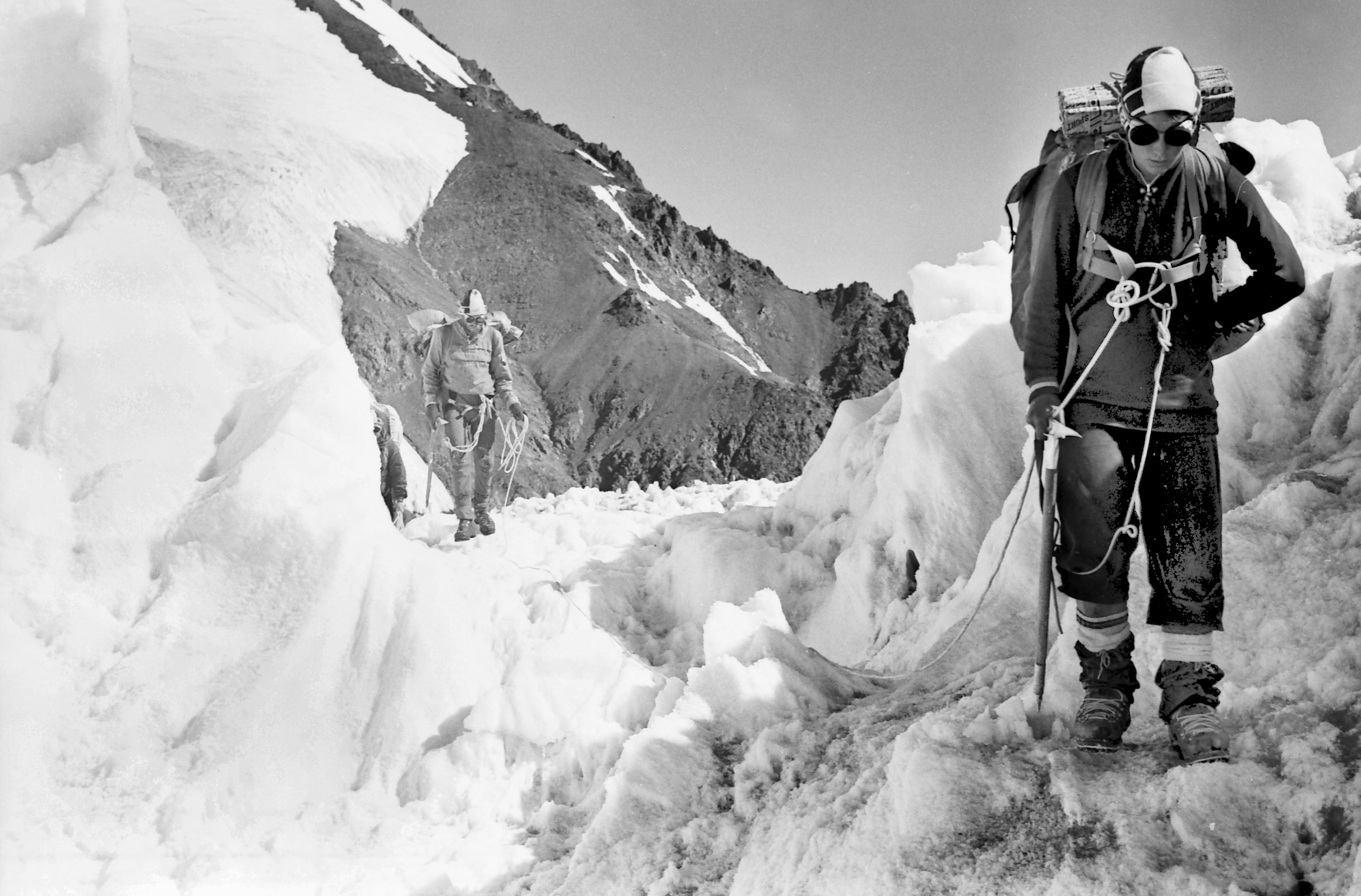
Expedition to Tartu Ülikool 350 in 1982

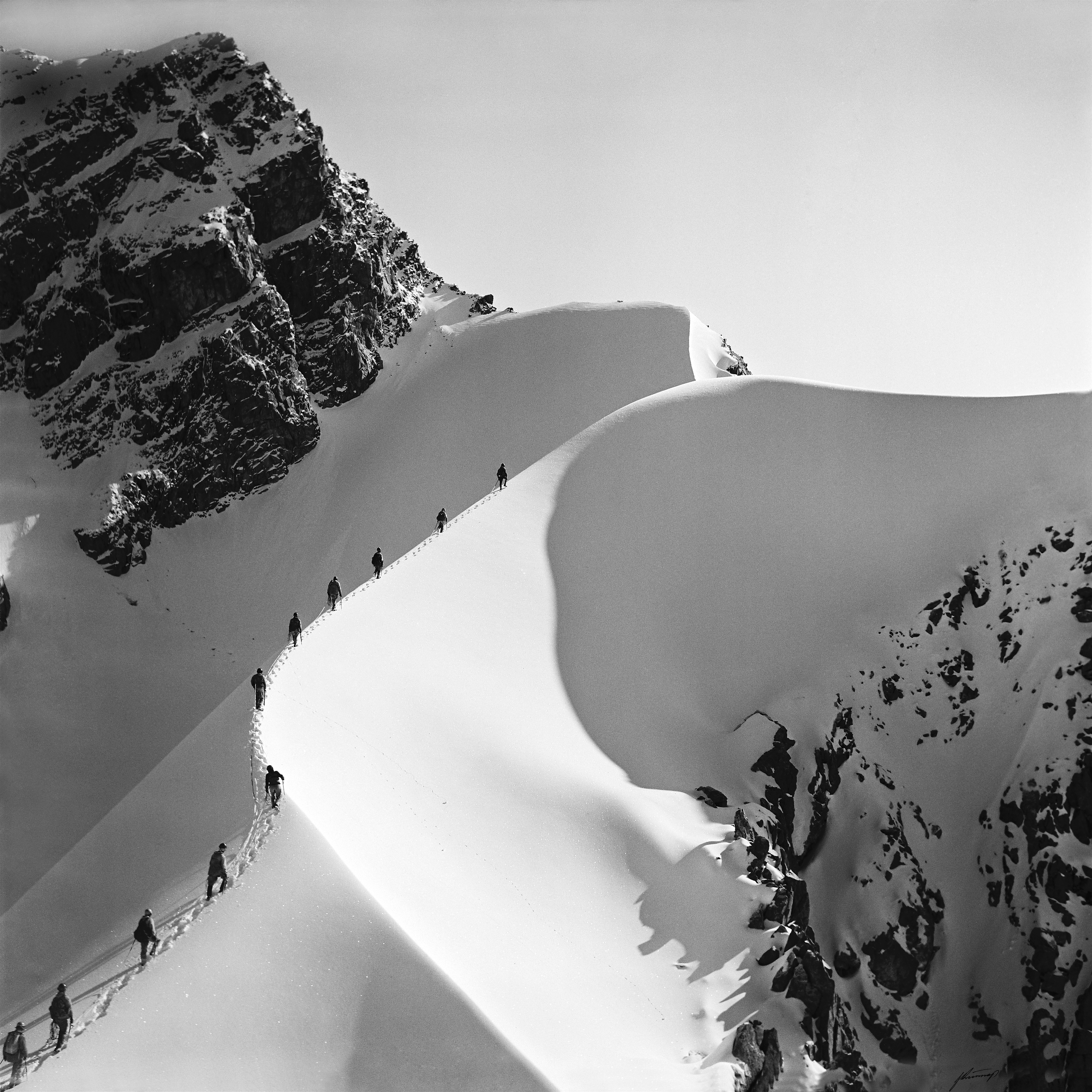
"Tõus" (Ascent; 1983)

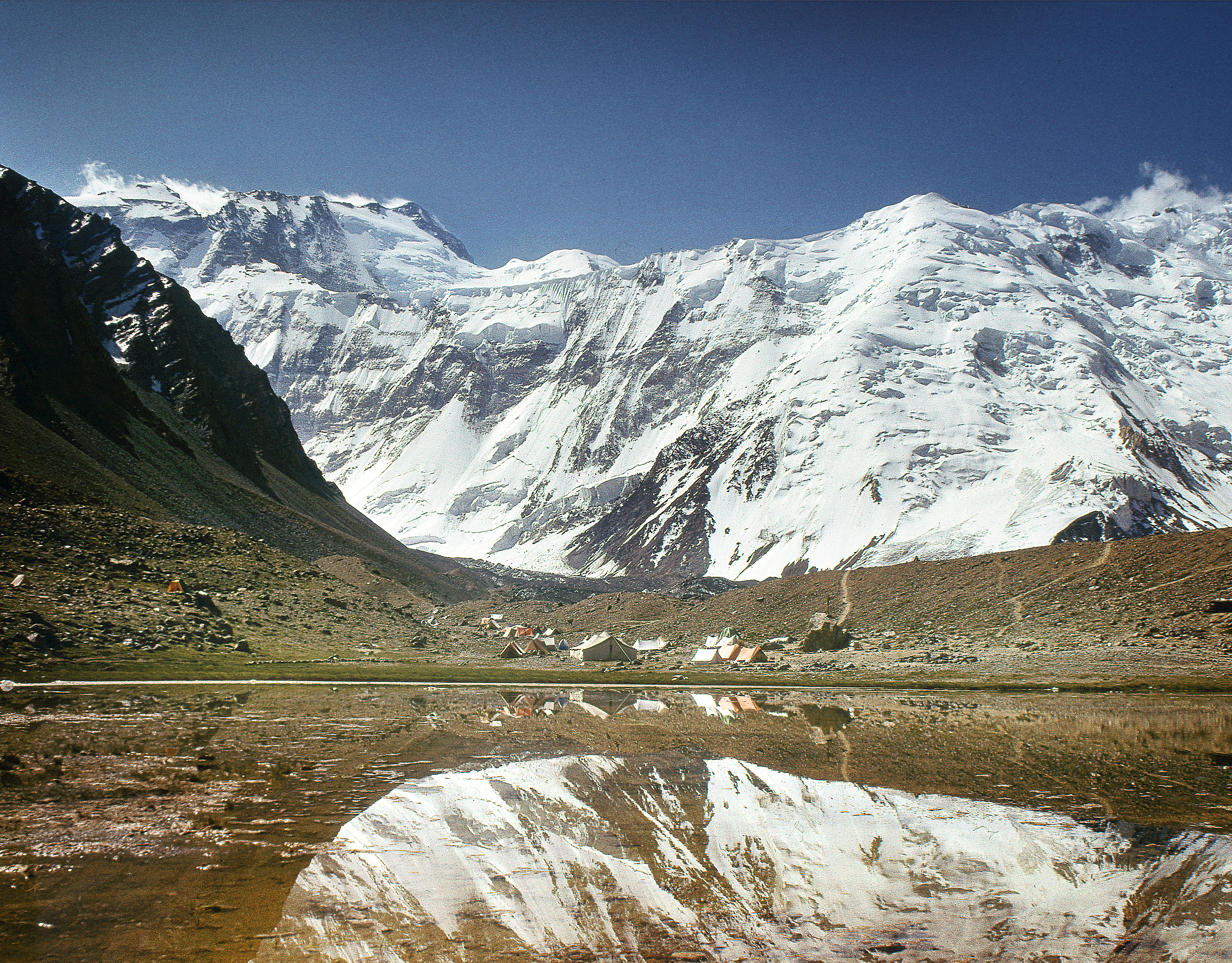
Ismail Samani Peak in 1986

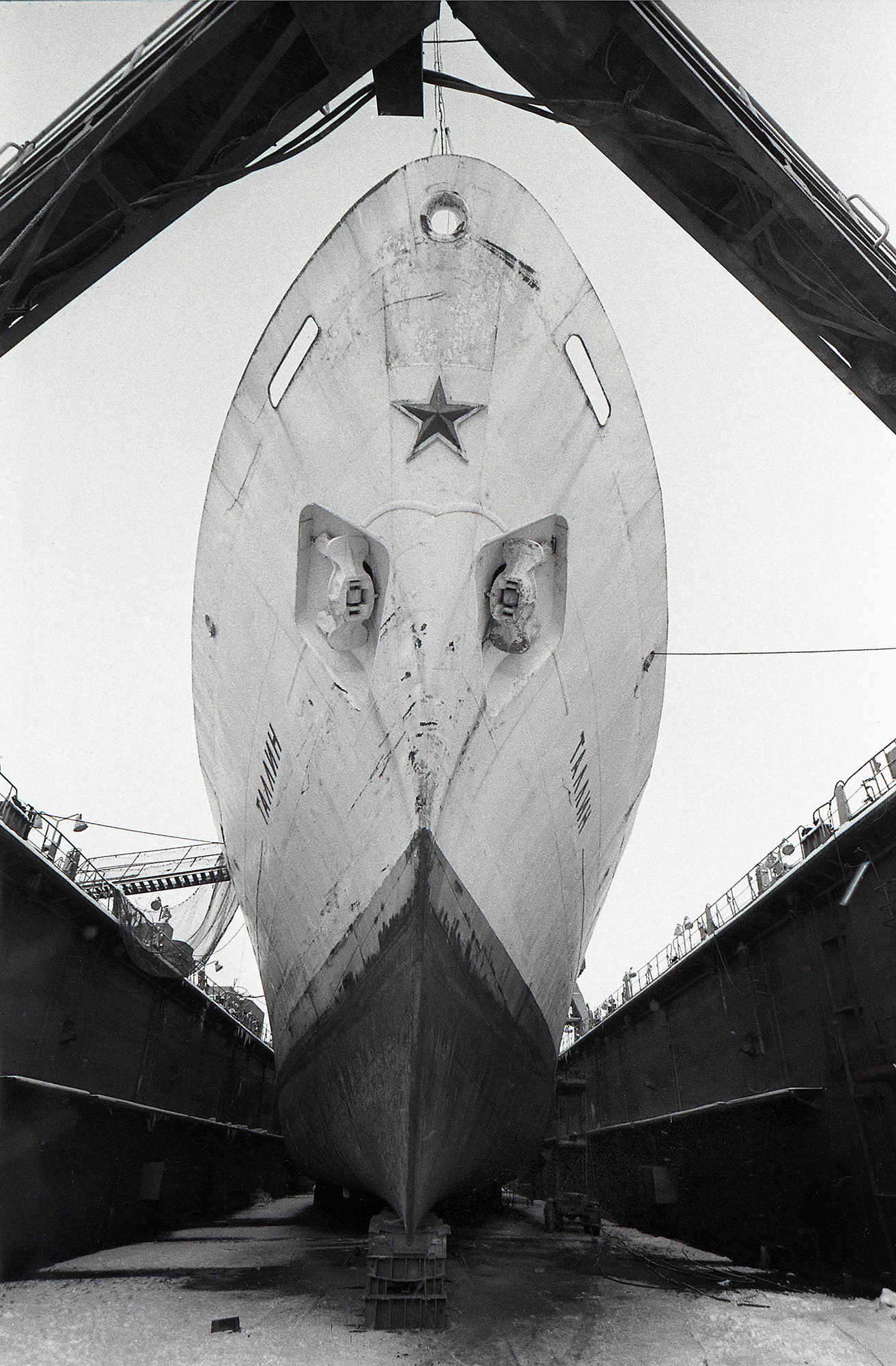
Tallinn (ship) in 1986

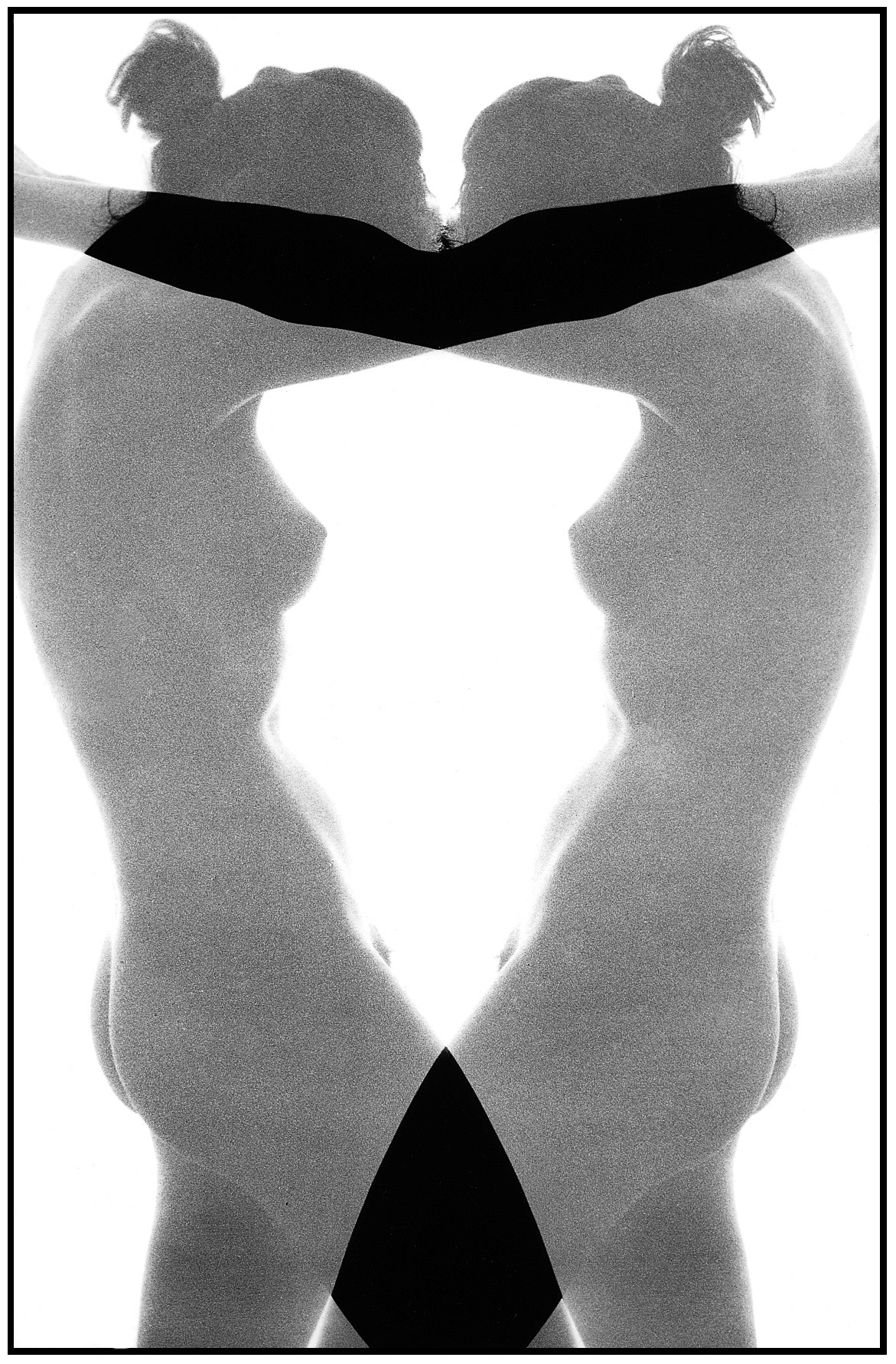
"Aktikompositsioon 19" (Nude composition 19; 1988)

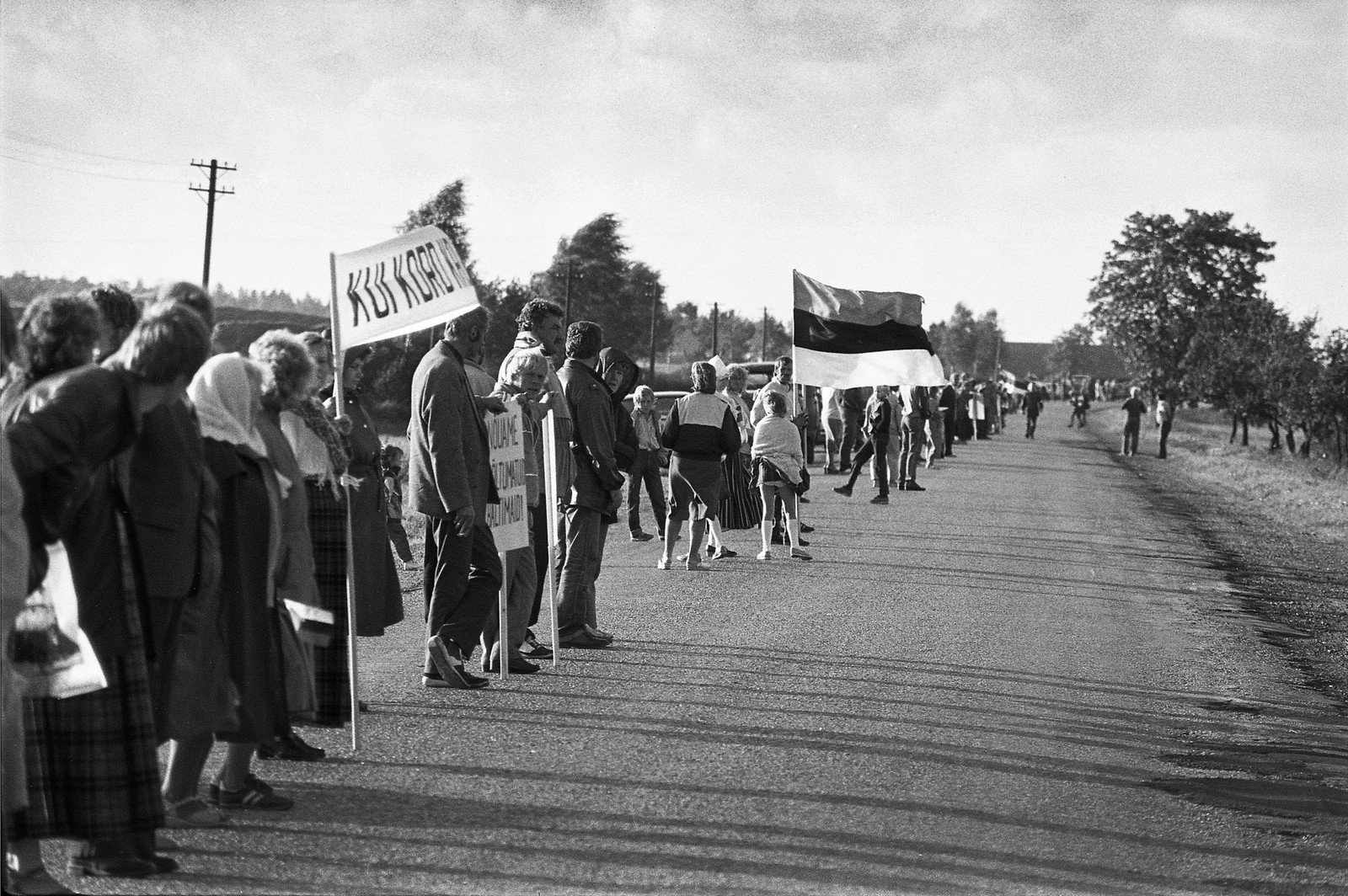
Baltic Way in Estonia (1989)

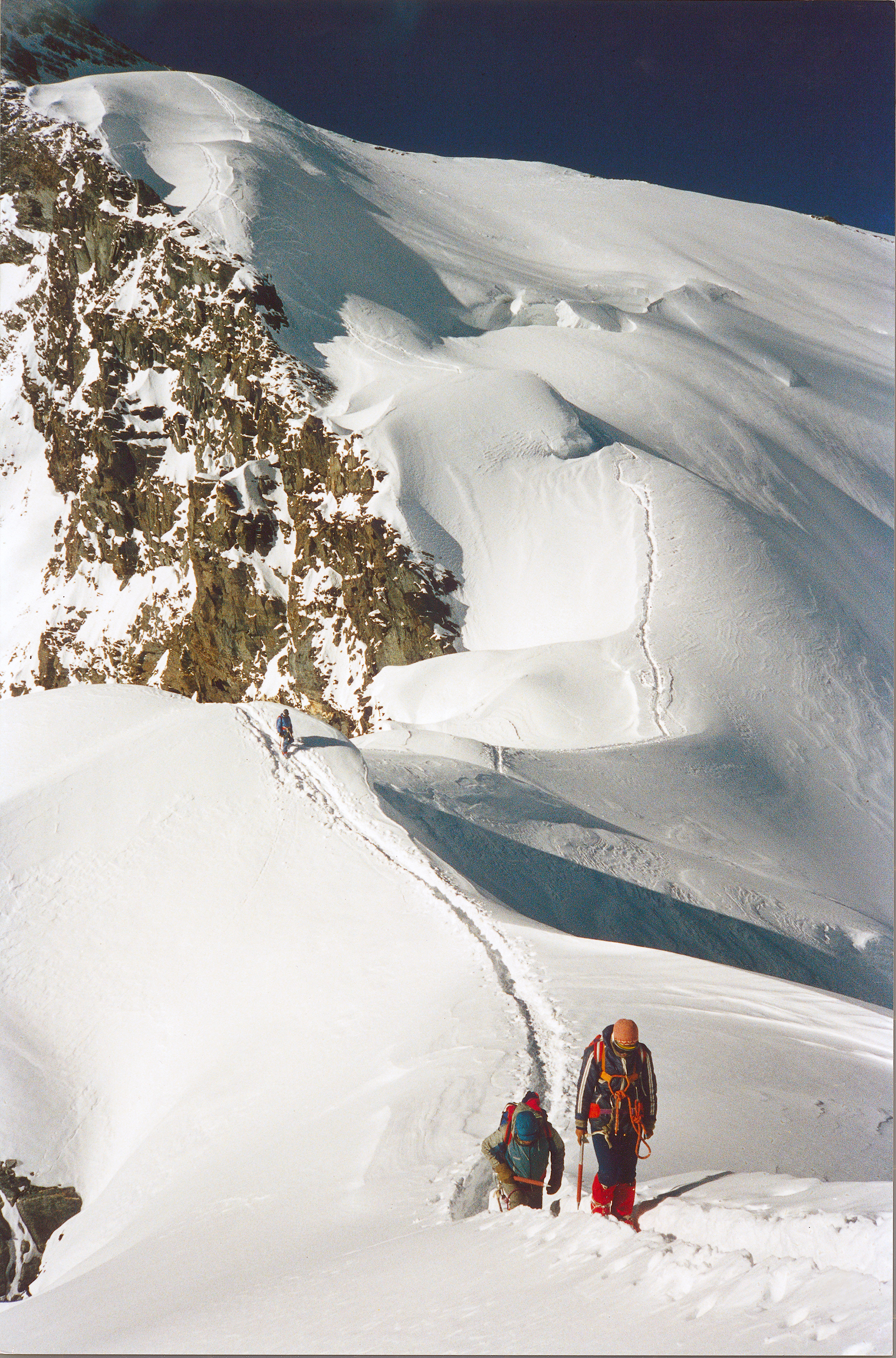
Descent from Korzhenevskaya (1990)

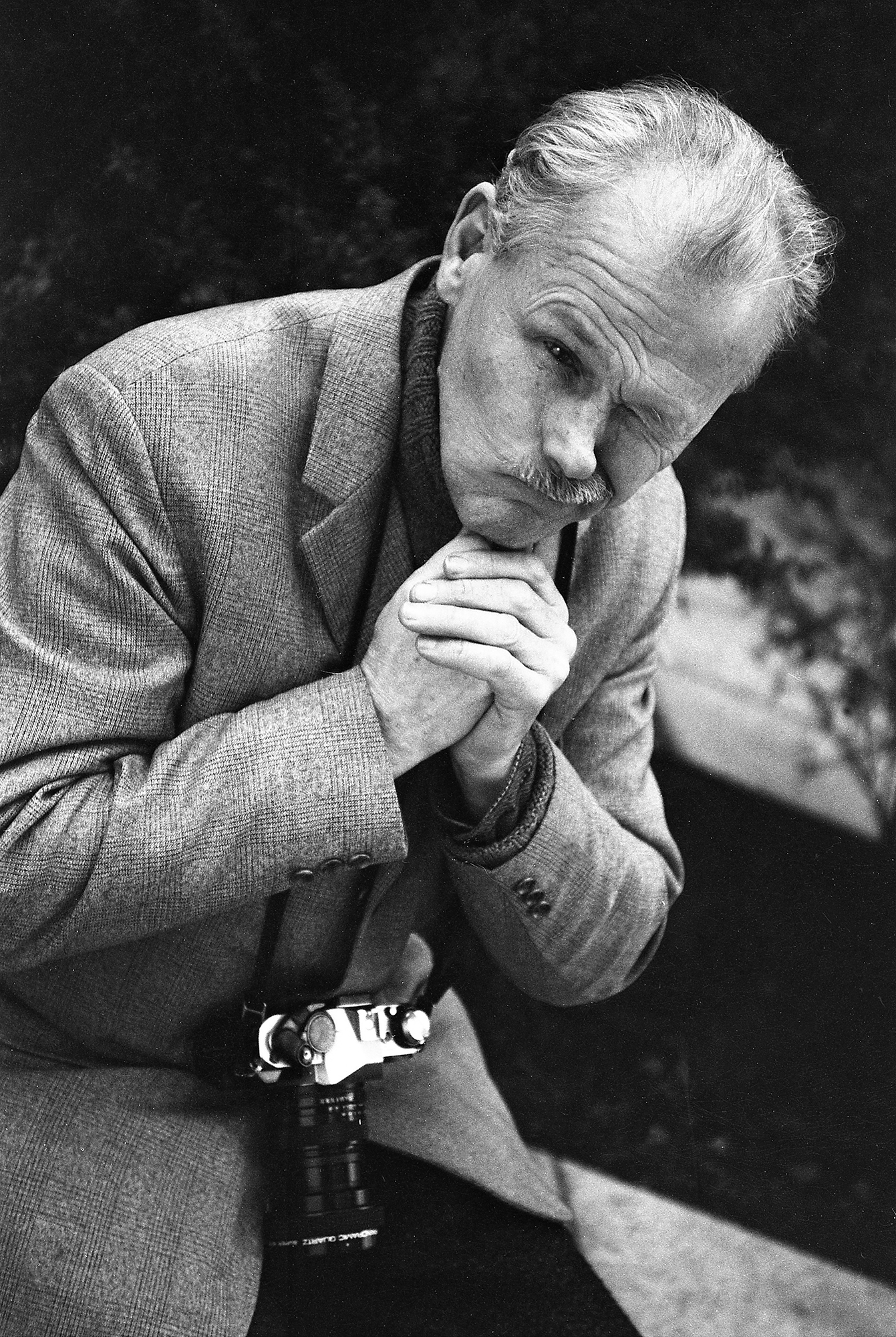
Kalju Suur in 1992

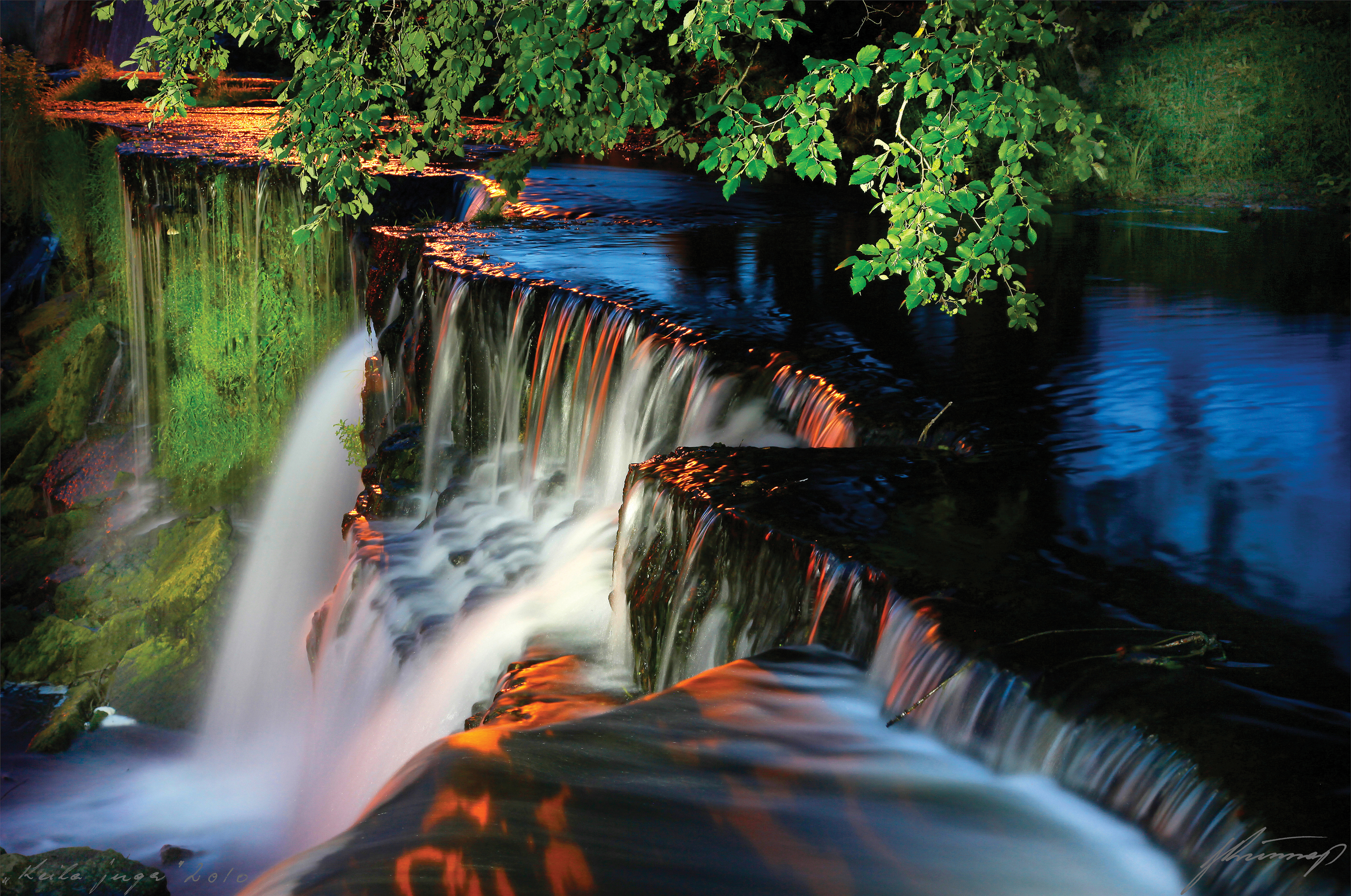
Keila Falls in 2007

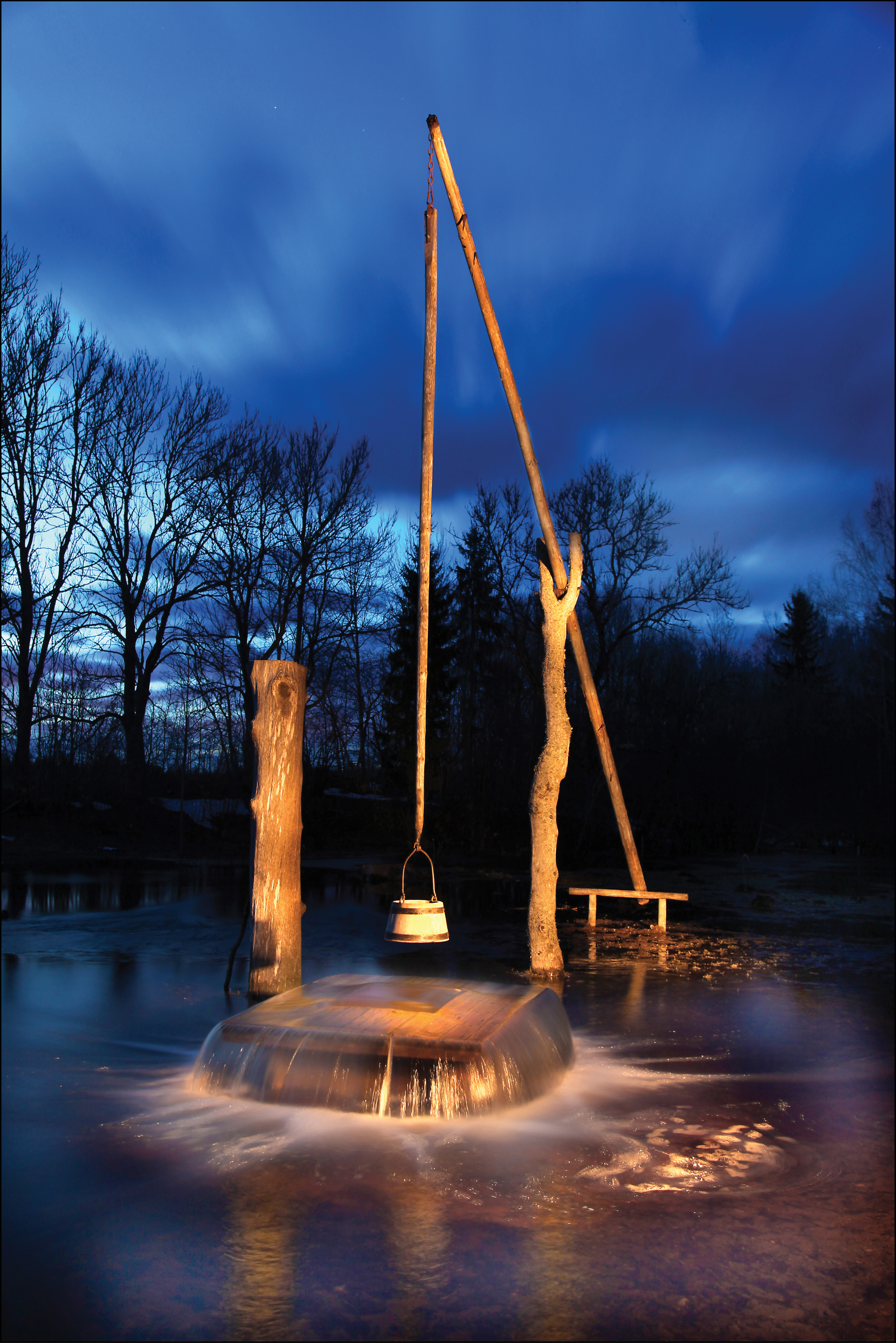
Tuhala Witch's Well (2011)

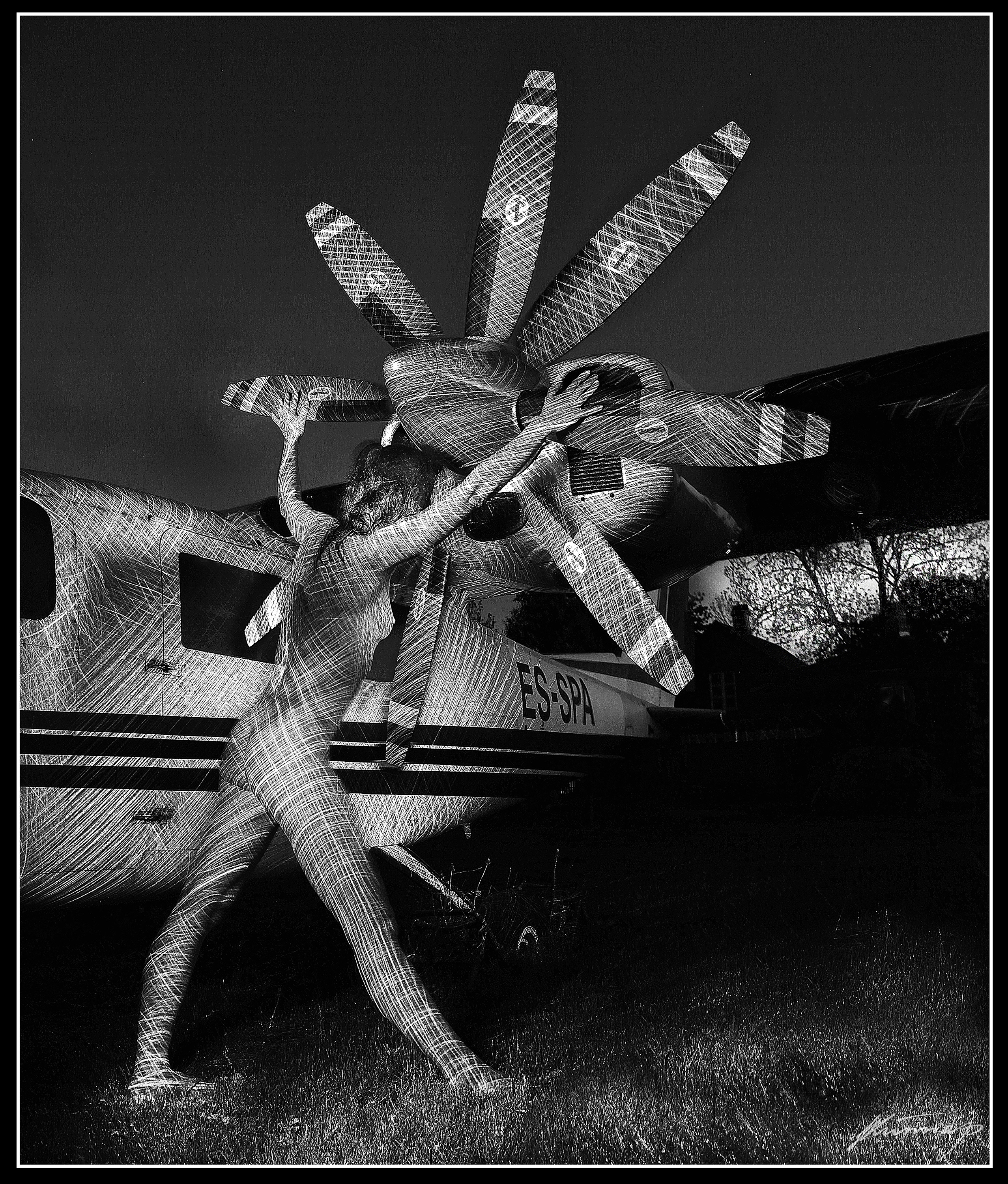
"Engraving with light XXX" (2015)

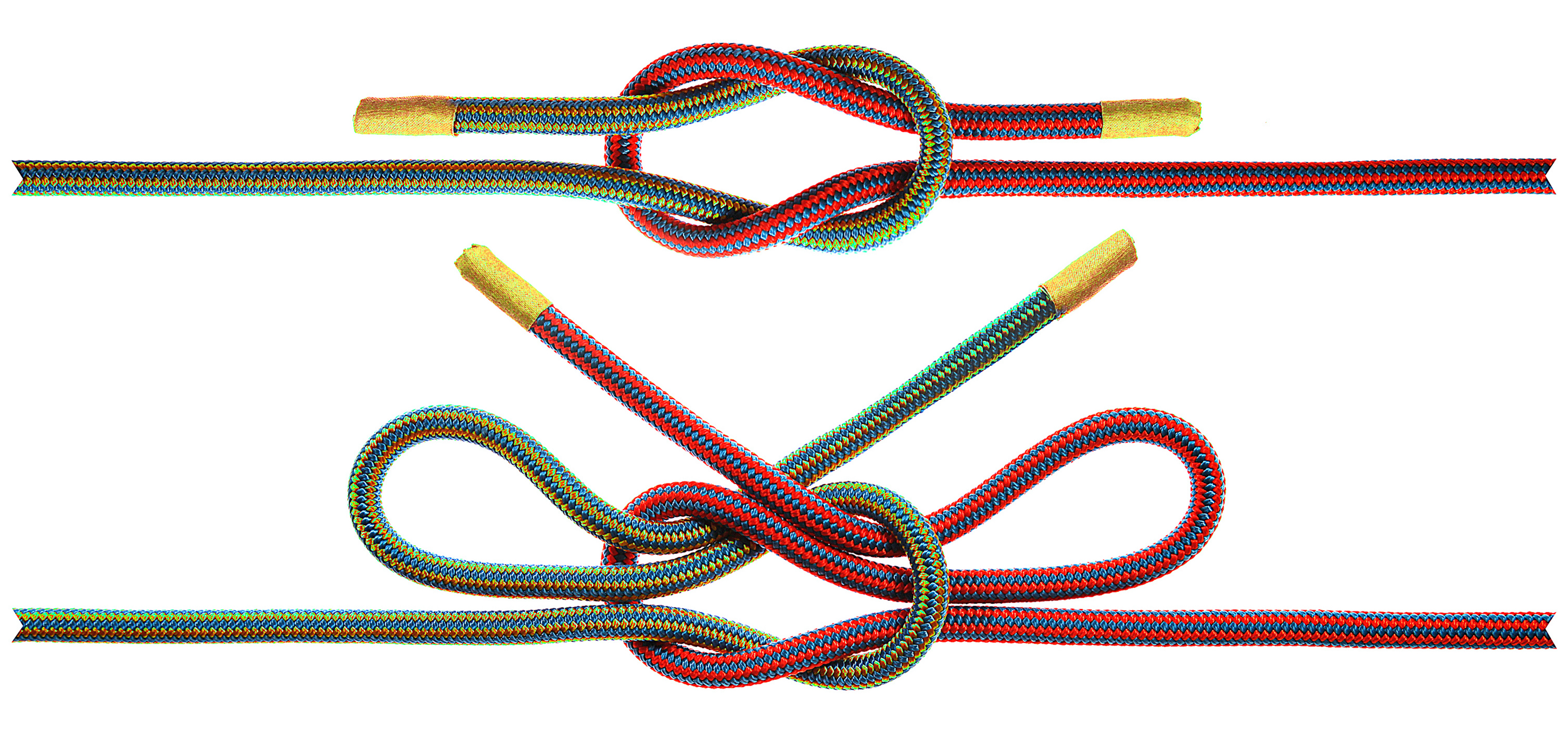
Reef knot (2015)

=== Books ===
- Matkaspordi käsiraamat, Jaan Künnapi Alpinismiklubi, 2004. ISBN 9949104122
- Fotograafia minu elus = Photography in my life, Jaan Künnapi Alpinismiklubi, 2013. ISBN 9789949309030
- Sõlmed ja pleisid, 2016. ISBN 9789949388738
- Jaan Künnap. Mitu elu on parem kui üks, 2025. ISBN 9789916430385
