= Suur =

Suur is an Estonian surname. Notable people with the surname include:

- Dmitri Suur (born 1975), Estonian ice hockey player
- Kalju Suur (1928–2013), Estonian photographer
- Neeme Suur (born 1968), Estonian politician
