= Els Aarne =

Estonian composer and pianist (1917–1995)

- Aarne in a photo by Kalju Suur
- Born: Elze Janovna Paemurru; 30 March 1917; Makiivka, Russian Empire
- Died: 14 June 1995 (aged 78); Estonia
- Occupations: Composer; pianist; pedagogue

Elze Janovna Paemurru (30 March 1917 – 14 June 1995), pseudonymously known as Els Aarne, was an Estonian composer, pianist and pedagogue, primarily during the Soviet Union. She taught at Tallinn Conservatory, her alma mater, from 1944 to 1974.

== Life and career ==
External videos
- Double Bass Sonata performed by Martin Onoper (bass) and Susanna Liisa Onoper (piano)
- Movement I
- Movement II
- Movement III

Elze Janovna Paemurru was born as on 30 March 1917 in Makiivka, Russian Empire (now Ukraine); her pseudonym was Els Aarne. Her father was the scientist Jaan Aarmann (1885–1978). She studied at the Tallinn Conservatory, Tallinn, graduating as a music teacher in 1939 after instruction from Gustav Ernesaks, in 1942 as pianist with Artur Lemba and in 1946 as composer under Heino Eller.

Aarne lectured at the Tallinn Conservatory on music theory from 1944 to 1974. Aarne married the horn player Mart Paemurru (1908–1972); they had two sons, the cellist and politician Peeter Paemurru (born 1948) and Mait Paemurru. She died on 14 June 1995 in Tallinn.

Els was known, among other things, as a chamber music composer (preferring to compose for violoncello and double-bass); in addition, she wrote two symphonies.

== List of compositions ==
List of compositions by Els Aarne
Title	Op.	Year	Genre	Notes
Symphony No. 1	Op. 38	1961	Orchestral	–
Symphony No. 2	Op. 45	1966	Orchestral	–
Double Bass Concerto	Op. 52	1968	Orchestral	–
Horn Concerto	Op. 33	1958	Orchestral	–
Piano Concerto	Op. 5	1945	Orchestral	–
Ballade	Op. 25	1955	Orchestral (piano and wind orchestra)	–
Adagio for wind orchestra	–	1955	Orchestral (wind orchestra)	–
Baltiskoye more, more mira	–	1958	Orchestral (wind orchestra)	–
Overture in D Major	Op. 55	1969	Orchestral	–
Overture for wind orchestra	–	1959	Orchestral (wind orchestra)	–
Suite druzya malle	–	1959	Orchestral	–
Double Bass Sonata	Op. 63	1976	Chamber (bass and piano); OCLC 11286836	
Capriccio for solo Cello	–	1977	Chamber (cello and possibly piano); OCLC 28343841	
Quintet for wind instruments	–	1965	Chamber	–
Trio	–	1946	Chamber	–
Two Estonian Dances	–	1954	Chamber (two violins and piano)	–
Improvisation	–	1952	Chamber (violin and piano)	–
Nocturne	–	1970	Chamber (cello and piano)	–
Poem	–	1941	Chamber (cello and piano)	–
Recital	–	1952	Chamber (violin and piano)	–
Runo	–	1969	Chamber (cello and piano)	–
Waltz	–	1952	Chamber (violin and piano)	–
Meditatsia	–	1970	Chamber (horn)	–
Ballade	–	1962	Piano (4 hands)	–
Pionerski pokhod	–	1949	Piano (cycle)	–
Eight etudes for beginners	–	1953	Piano	–
Four contrasts	–	1966	Piano	–
Improvisata	–	1967	Piano	–
Sonatina	–	1961	Piano	–
Twelve variations on a theme by Adolf Vedro	–	1939	Piano	Theme by composer Adolf Vedro
An die Heimat	–	1939	Vocal (cantata)	–
Meie paevade, laul	–	1965	Vocal (cantata)	–
Nasha poberezhe	–	1959	Vocal (cantata) (acapella choir)	Text by D. Vyazanin
Obogatitel uglya	–	1959	Vocal (cantata) (acapella choir)	Text by Y. Kross
Poi, svobodnyi narod	–	1949	Vocal (cantata) (acapella choir)	Text by D. Vaarandi
Rodine	–	1939	Vocal (cantata) (choir and orchestra)	Text by E. Tarum
Valuoja	–	1956	Vocal (cantata) (choir and orchestra)	–
Kolybelnaya	–	1953	Vocal (choir and orchestra)	Text by Kaarel Korsen
More-nashi polya	–	1953	Vocal (choir and orchestra)	Text by M. Kesamaa
S siloi molodosti	–	1953	Vocal (soloists, choir, orchestra)	Text by M. Korsen
