= Kõue =

Village in Estonia

Coordinates: 59°05′N 25°14′E

- Village
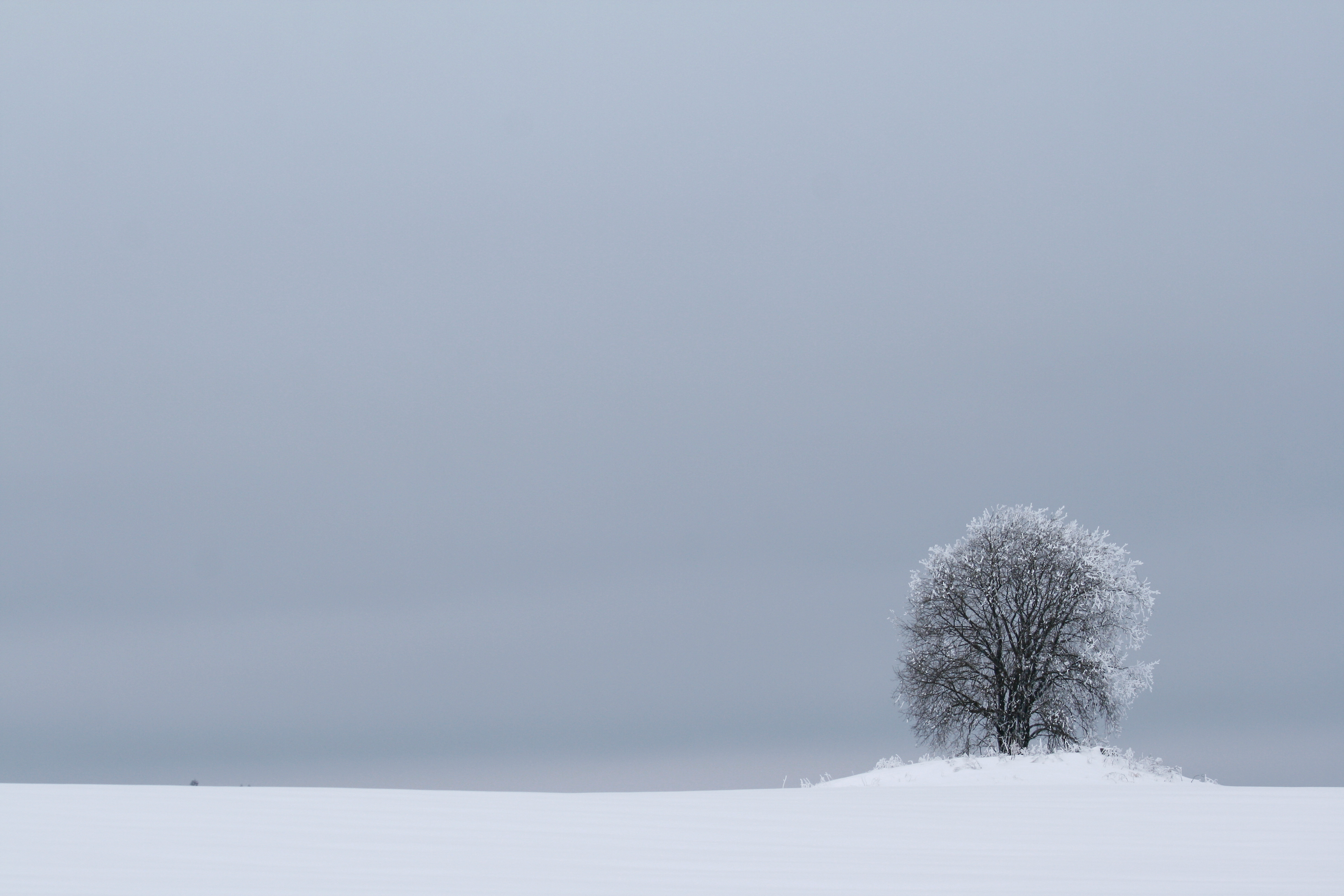
- Kõue village
- Interactive map of Kõue
- Country: Estonia
- County: Harju County
- Municipality: Kose Parish
- Time zone: UTC+2 (EET)
  - Summer (DST): UTC+3 (EEST)

Kõue (German: Kau) is a village in Kose Parish, Harju County in northern Estonia.

Explorer Otto von Kotzebue (1788–1846) spent his last years in Kõue Manor (Triigi) which he bought in 1832.

Estonian mountaineer and photographer Jaan Künnap was also born and raised in Kõue.

After the local government council elections in 2013, Kõue municipality joined Kose municipality and is now known as Kose Parish.
