= Tartu Ülikool 350 =

Mountain in the Pamir mountains, Tajikistan

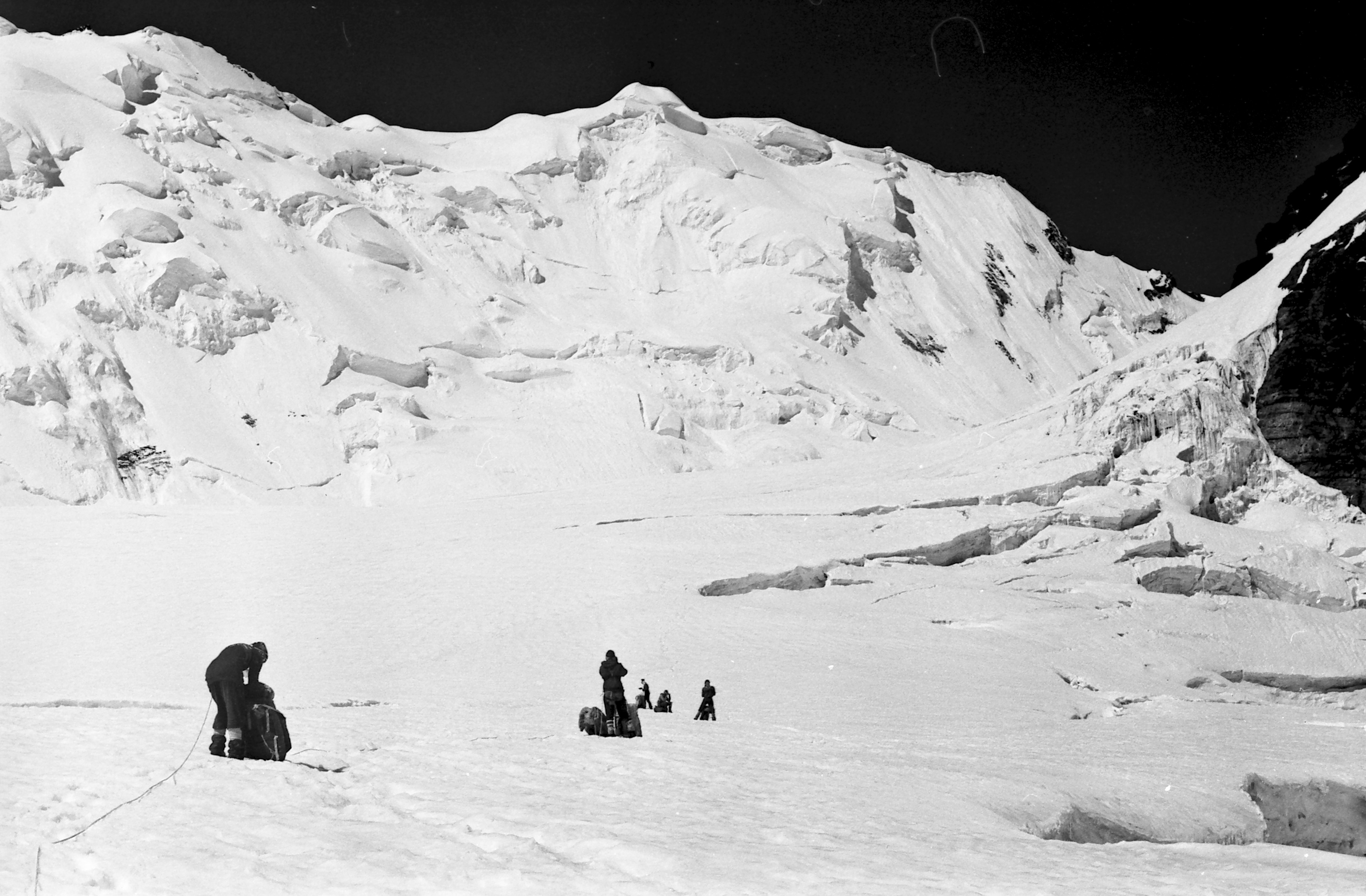
- Tartu Ülikool 350 from northeast

Highest point
- Elevation: 6,258 m (20,531 ft)
- Coordinates: 38°37′46″N 72°24′12″E

Geography
- Location within Tajikistan
- Location: Tajikistan
- Parent range: Pamir Mountains

Climbing
- First ascent: August 1982

Tartu Ülikool 350 (English: University of Tartu 350) is a mountain peak in Central Pamir. It was first reached in 1982 to celebrate the 350th anniversary of the founding of the University of Tartu. It is located in the Tanimas mountain range in Tajikistan. At the time of first ascent it was considered to be the highest unreached peak in the territory of the Soviet Union.

The summit has been reached by Estonian climbing groups twice, on 3 August 1982 (group: Kalev Muru, Kalle Hansen, Anu Kallavus, Andres Paris, Jaan Künnap and Kalle Aedviir), and on 31 July 2012 (group: Andres Hiiemäe, Erik Jaaniso, Marko Aasa, Priit Rooden, Merili Simmer, Kristjan-Erik Suurväli, Tõnu Põld, Priit Simson, Priit Joosu, Sven Oja).

It was first thought to rise to 6,350 metres (20,830 ft), hence its suitability to commemorate the 350th anniversary of the university, but according to the GPS-measurements made on the second ascent in 2012 the peak was actually found to be 6,258 metres (20,531 ft) high.

At the time of the first conquest it was one out of five peaks in Soviet Union that was named after a university and the highest of them.

The peak is located at two weeks distance from the nearest inhabited area. Near to it there is also a 6,277-metre (20,594 ft) high Mt. J.F. Parrot that is named after Friedrich Parrot, who was a physics professor and a rector at the University of Tartu and who is considered the pioneer of scientific mountaineering.

Among the things left at the top of the peak are, a plaque, a traditional university cap and the university flag.

== Gallery ==
Photos by Jaan Künnap from 1982 expedition:

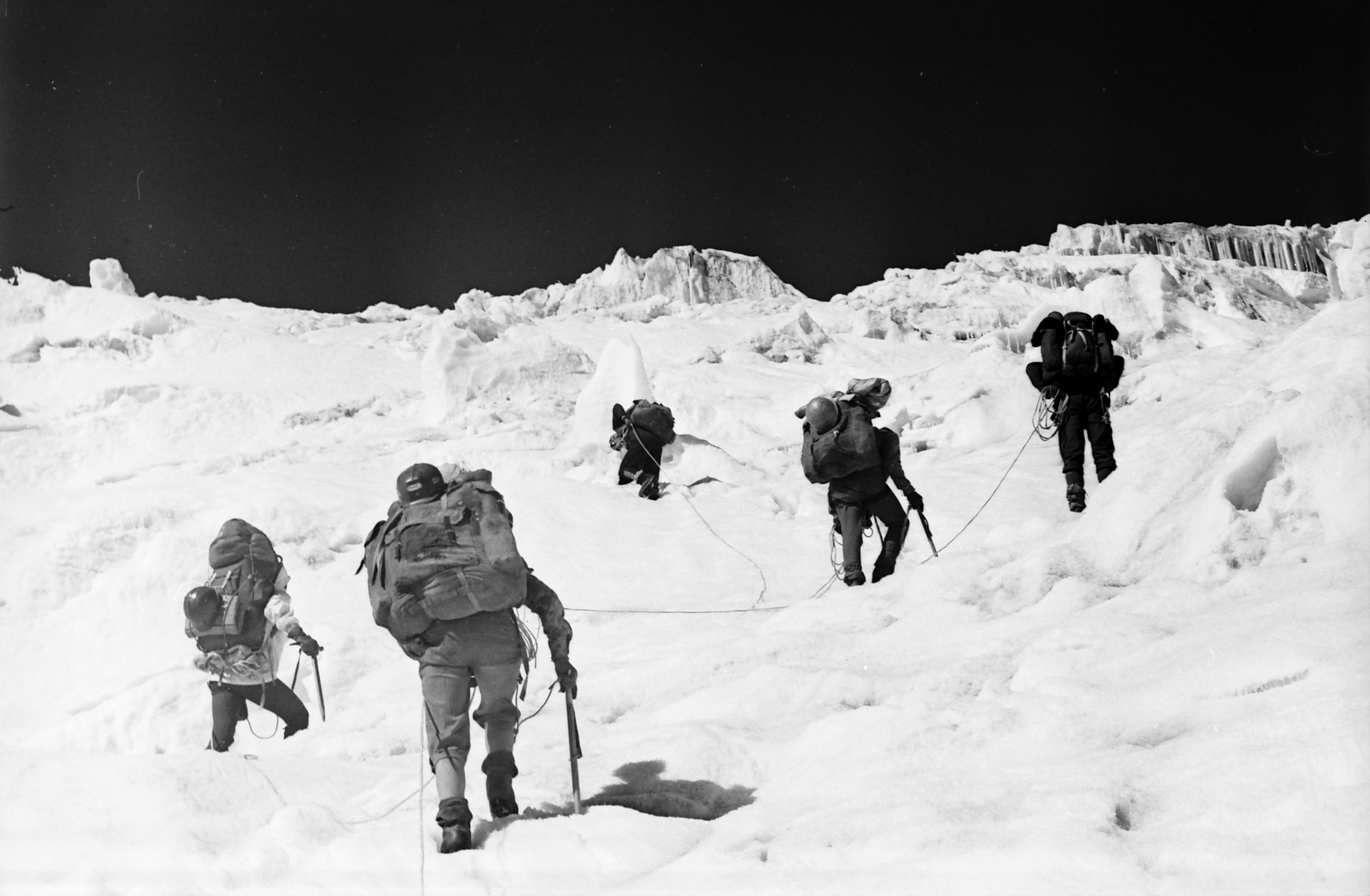

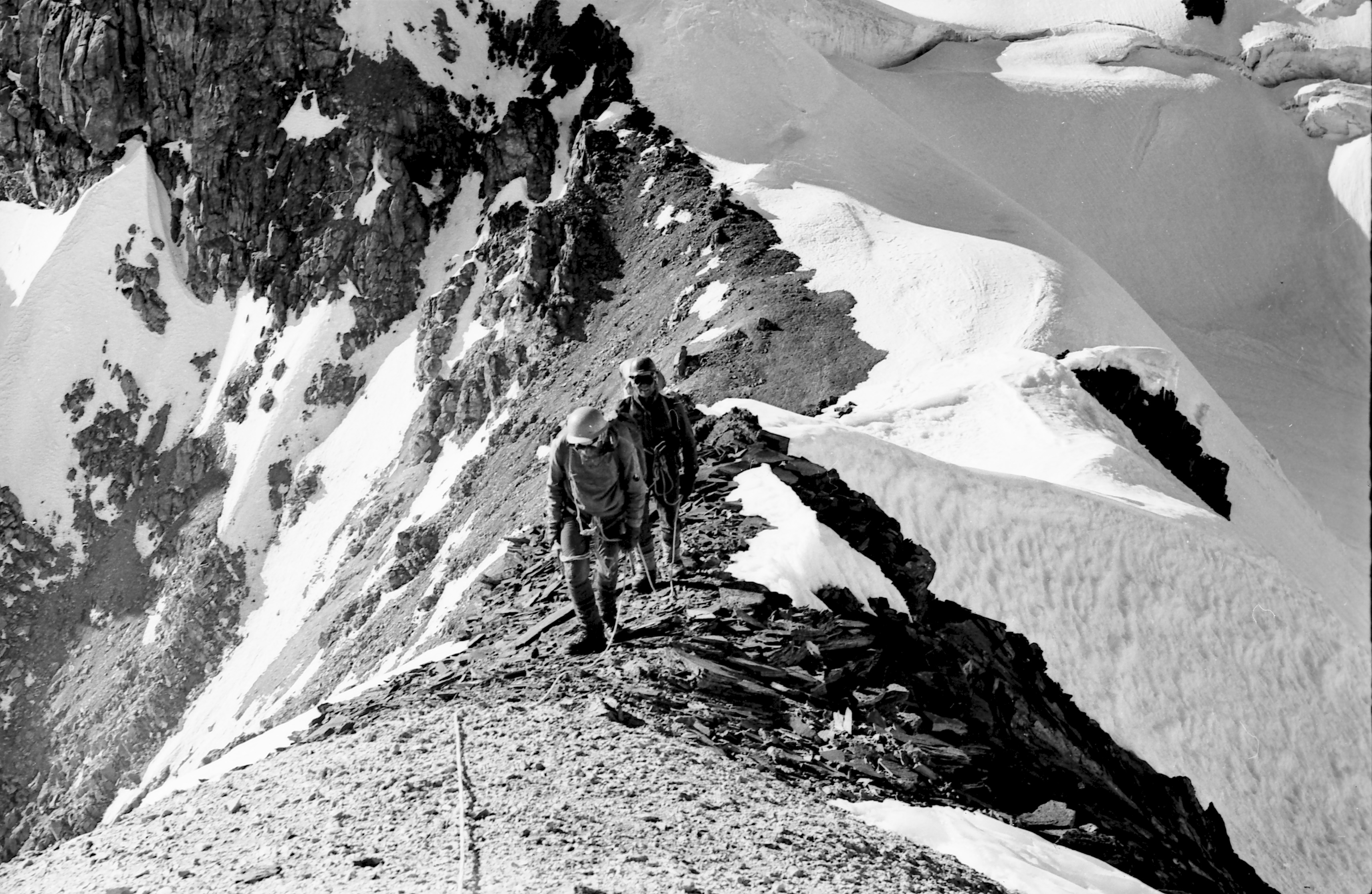

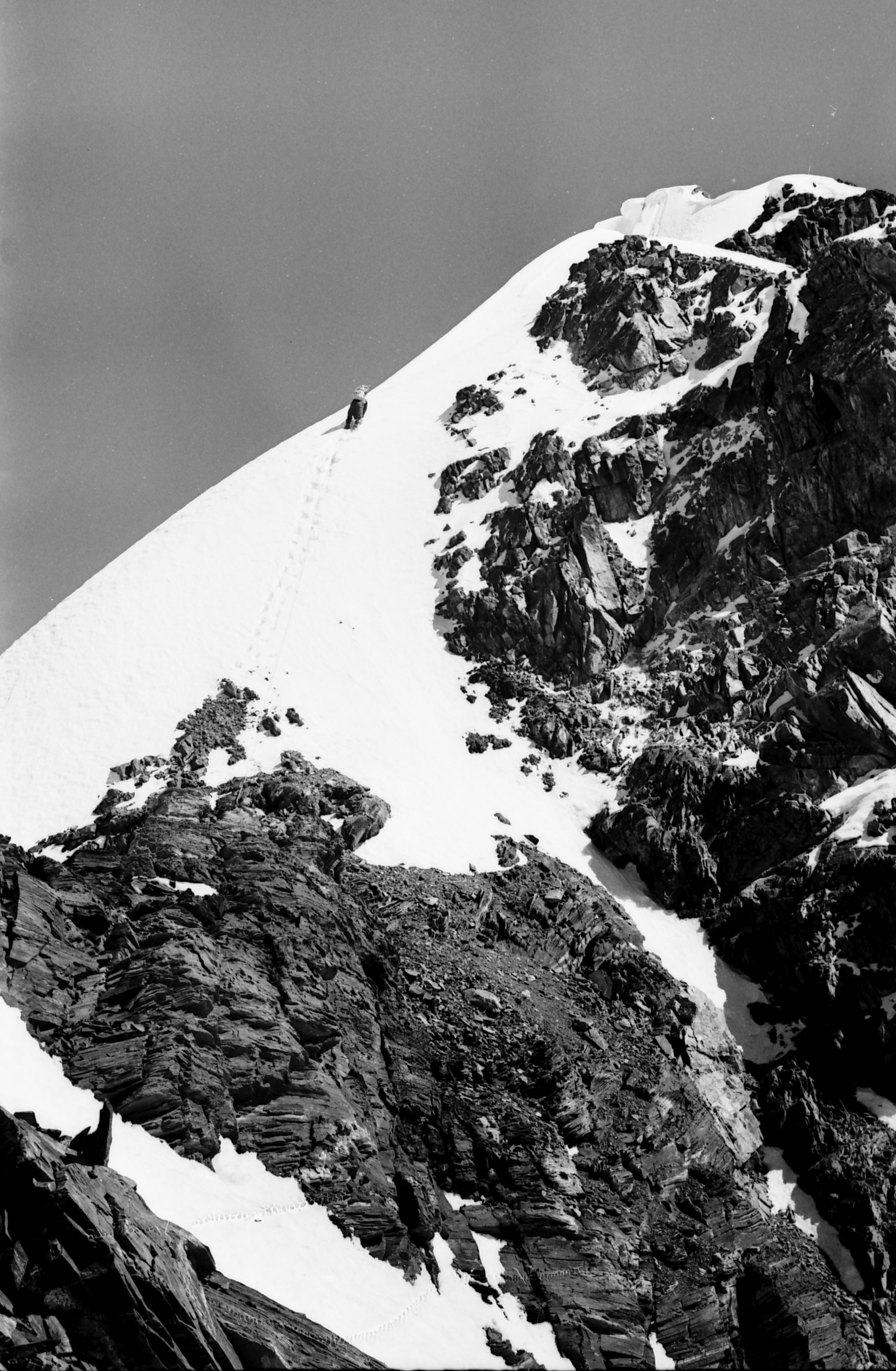

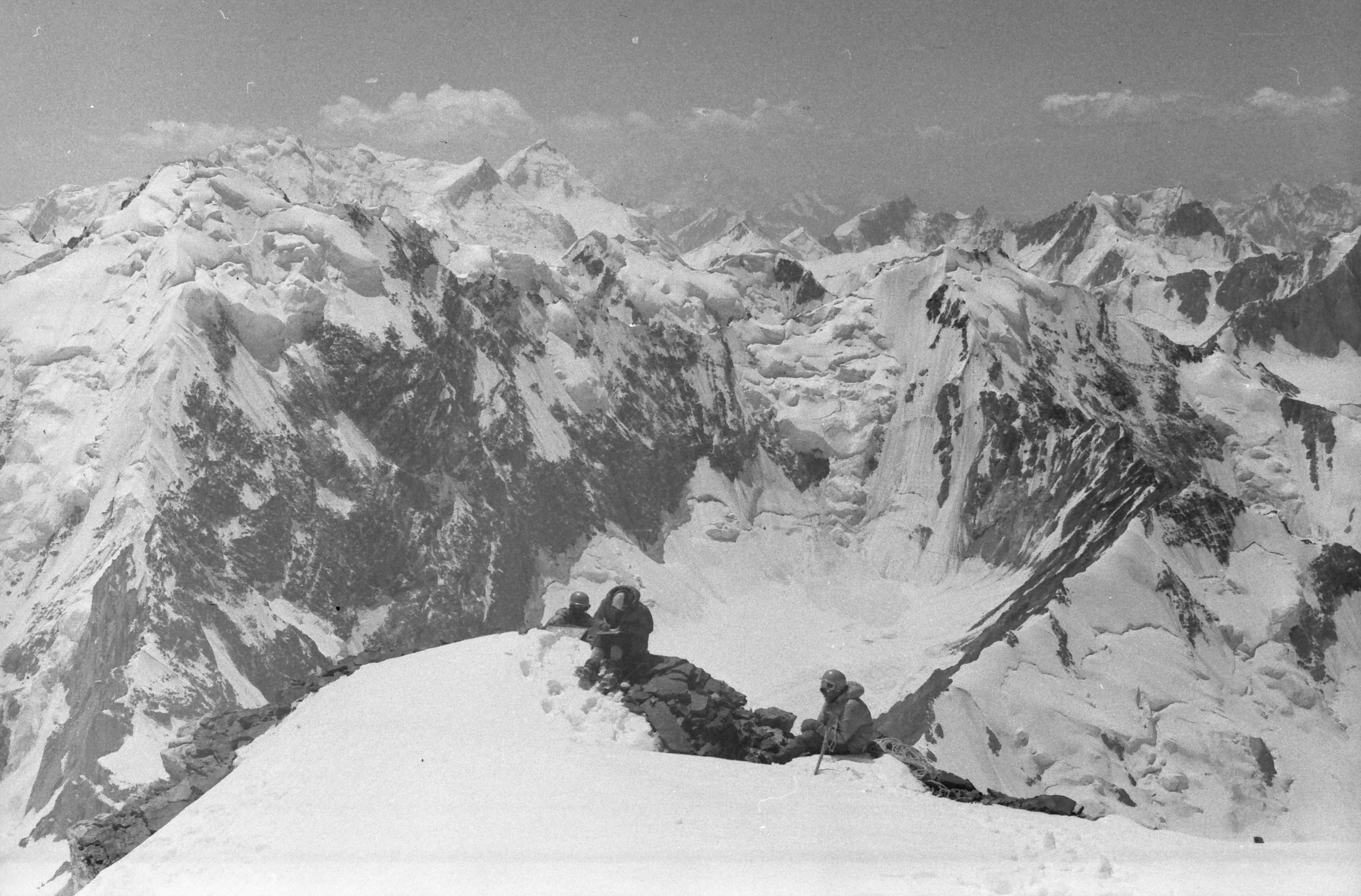

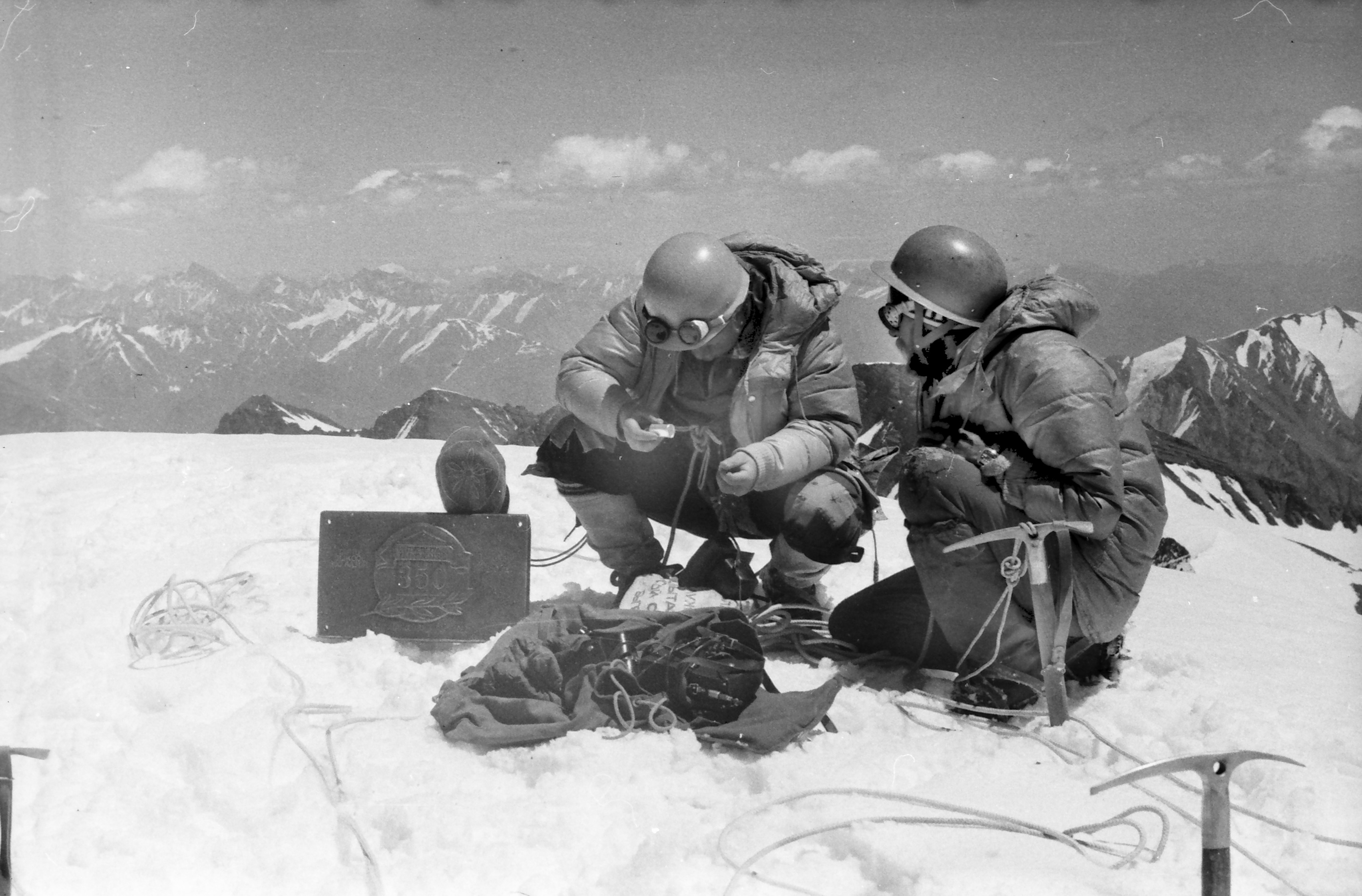

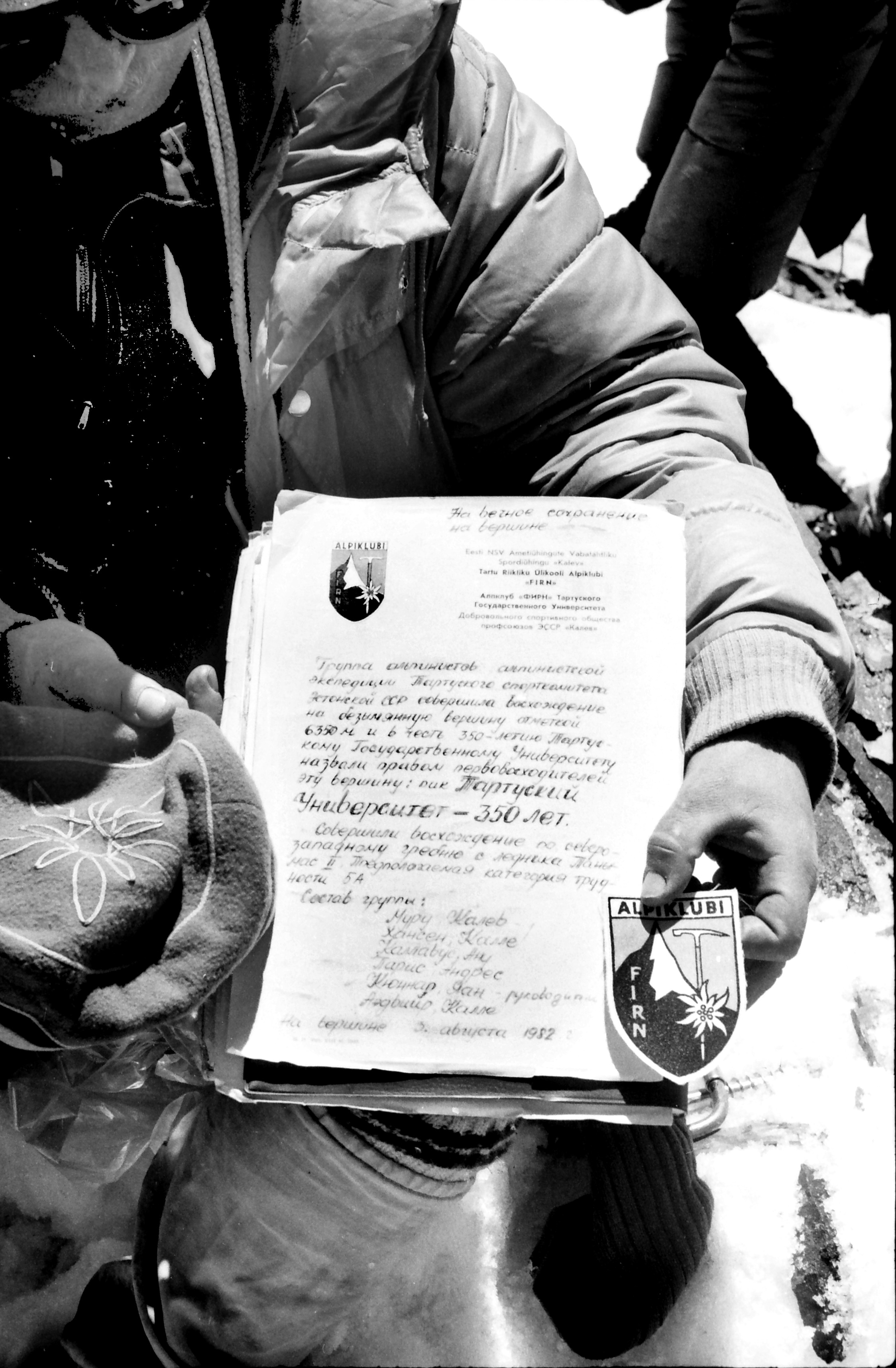

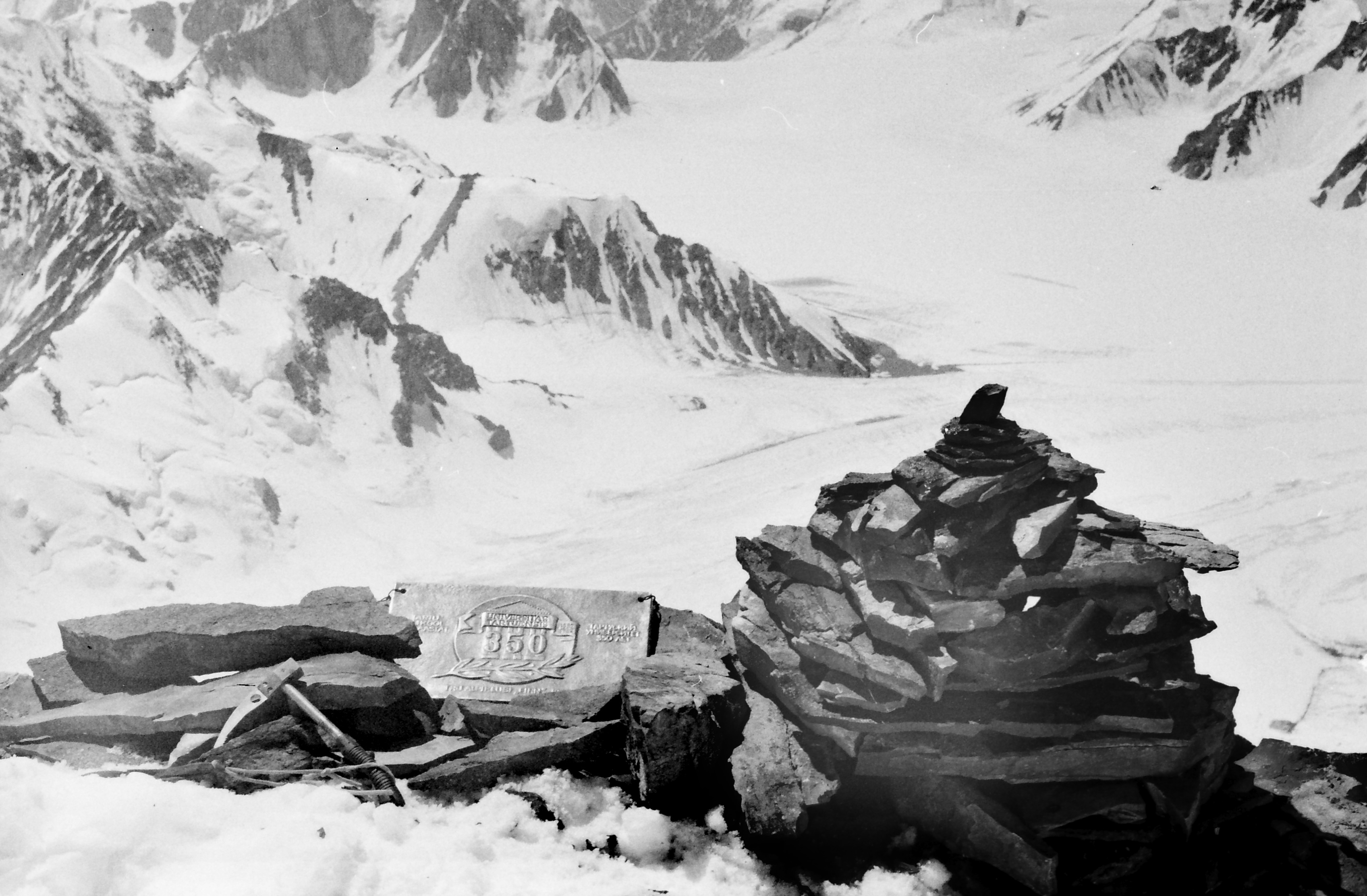

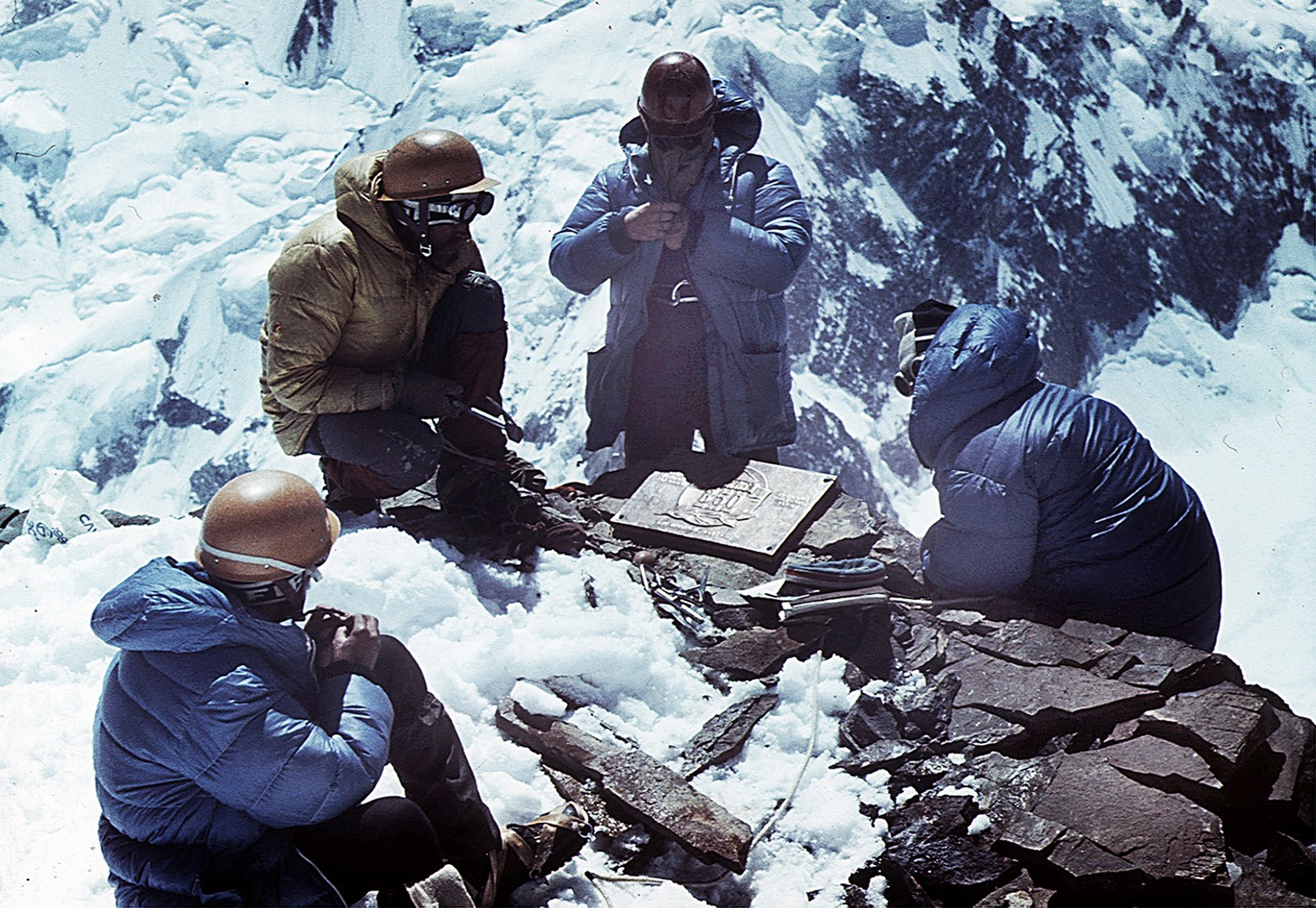

Photos by Andres Hiiemäe from 2012 expedition:

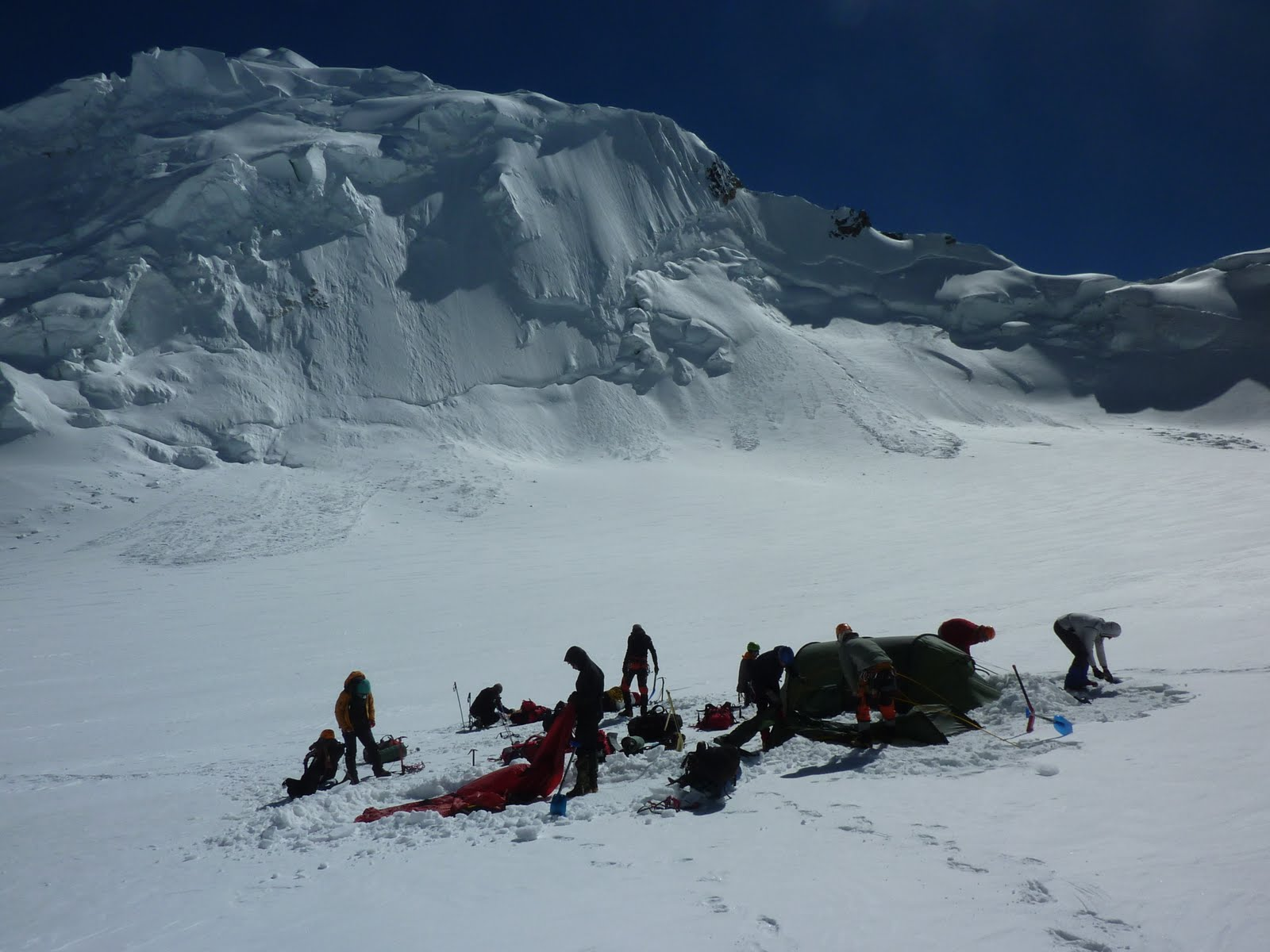

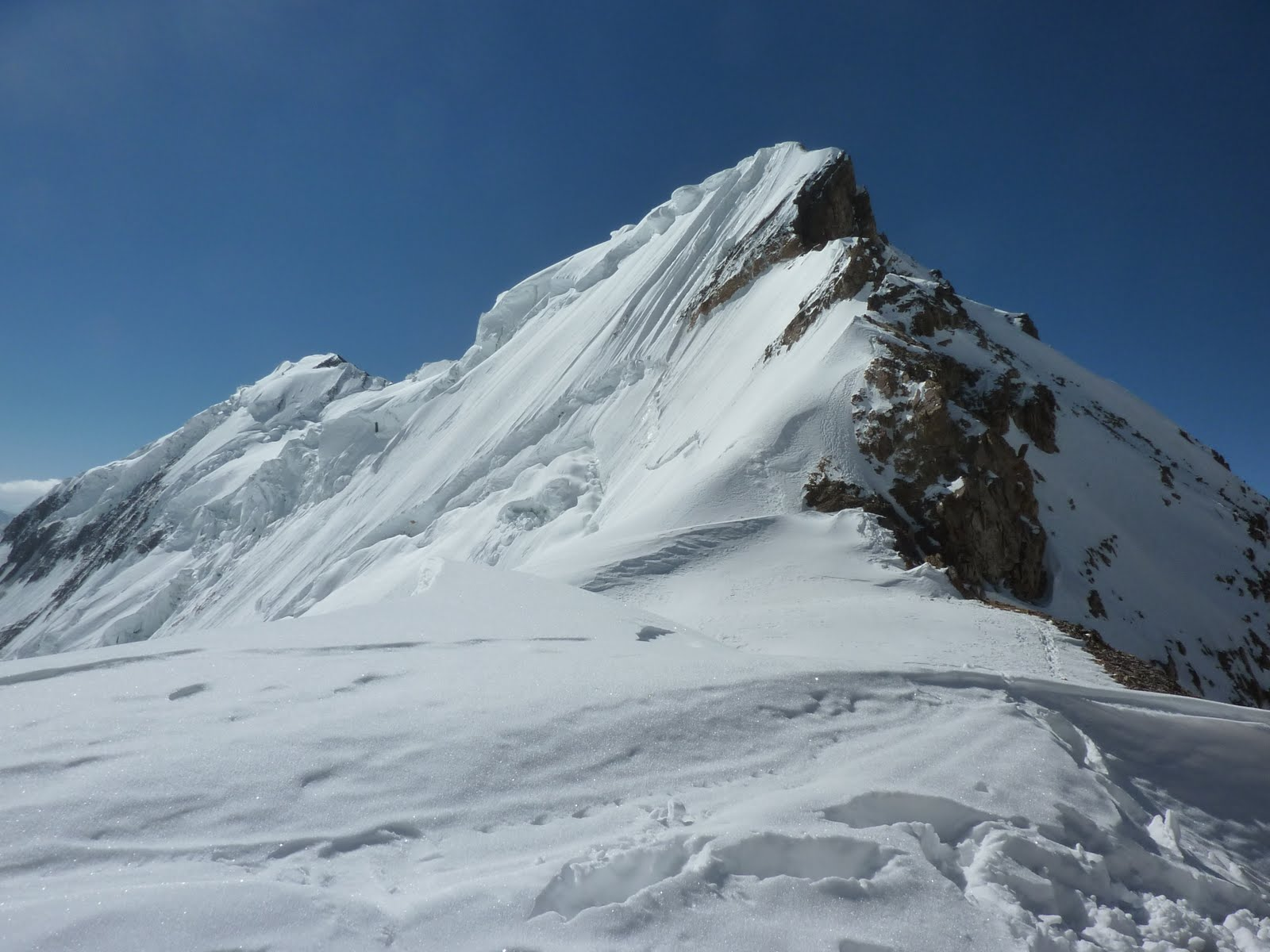

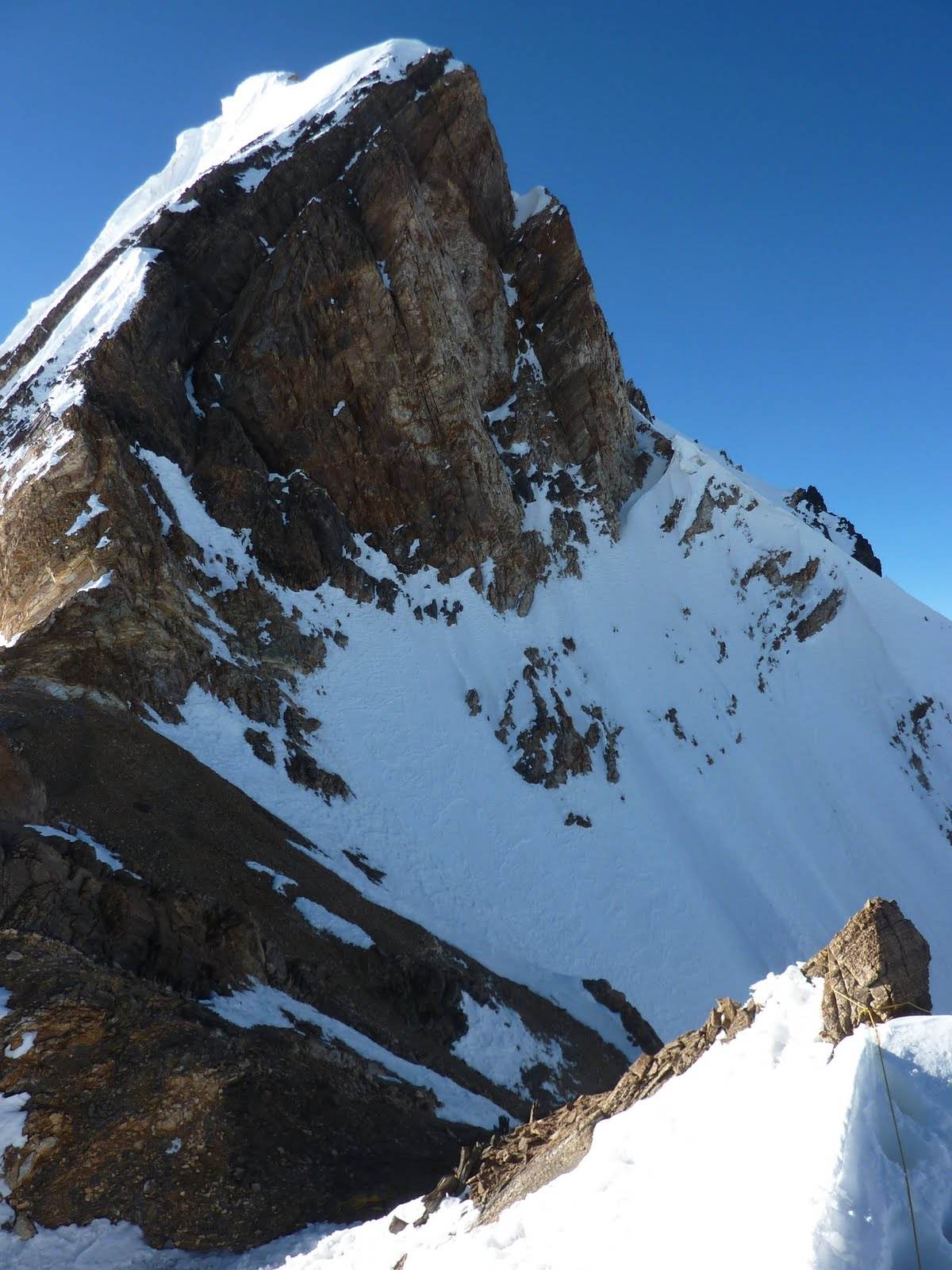

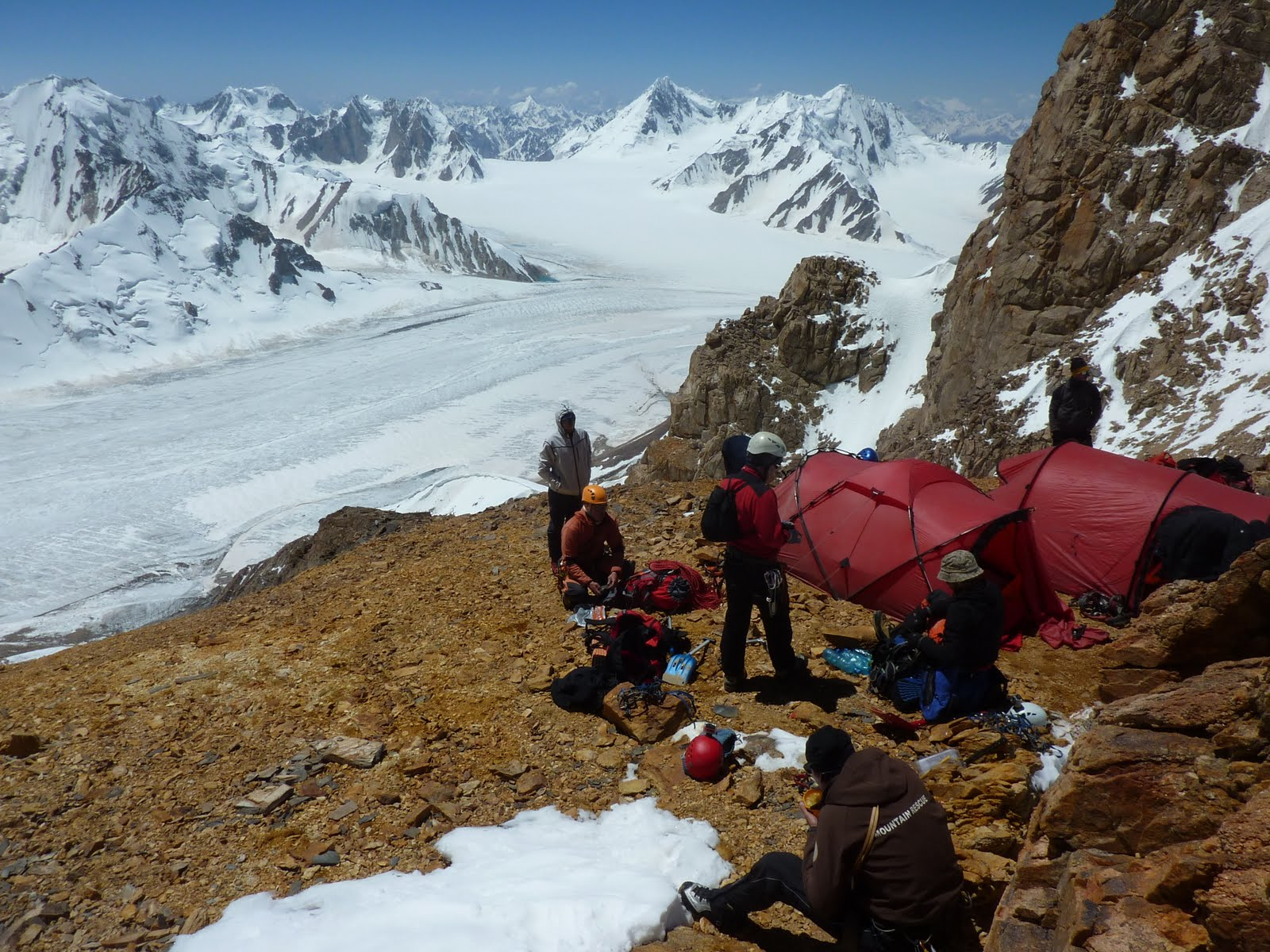

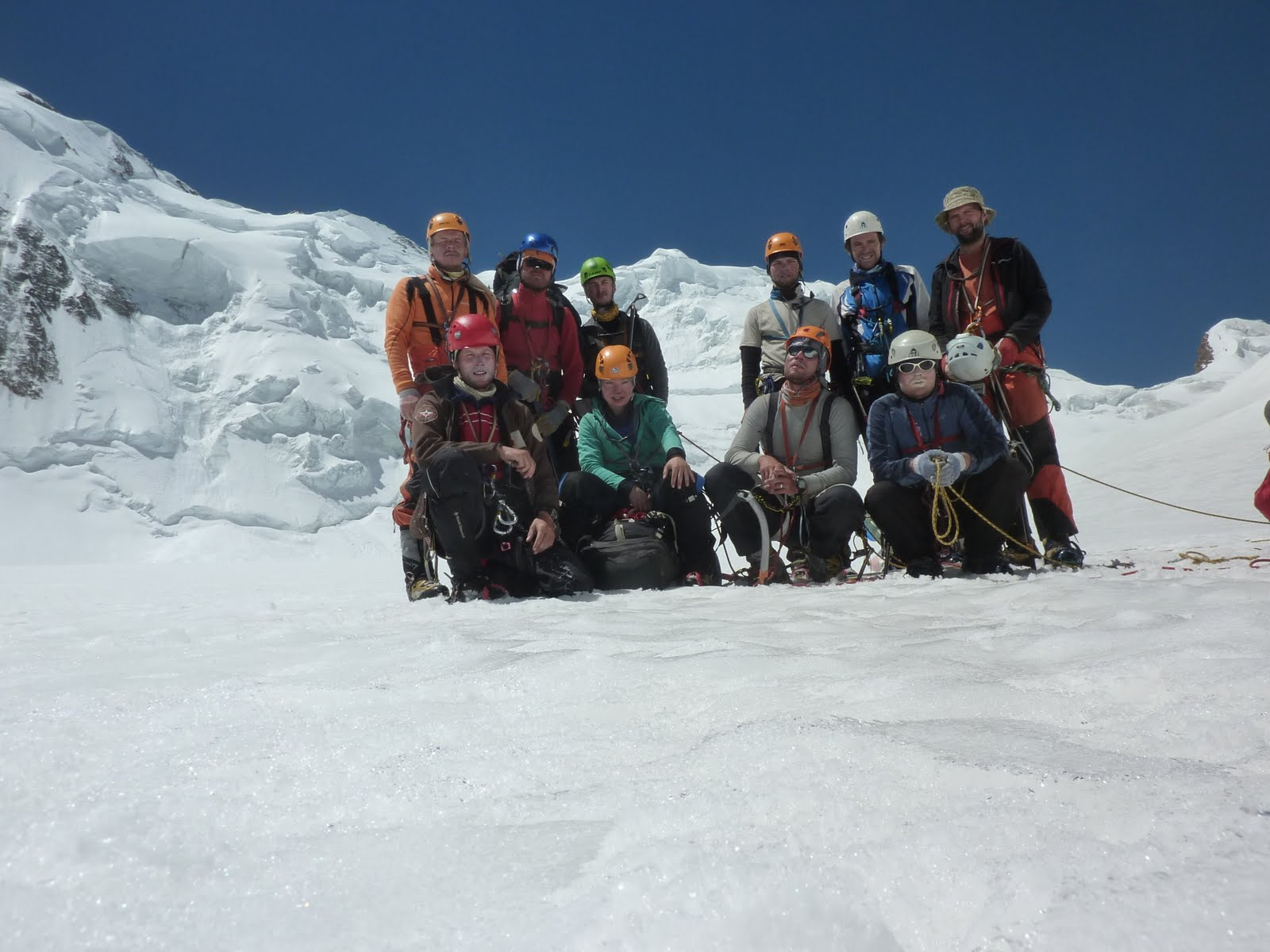
