= Kalju Suur =

Estonian photographer

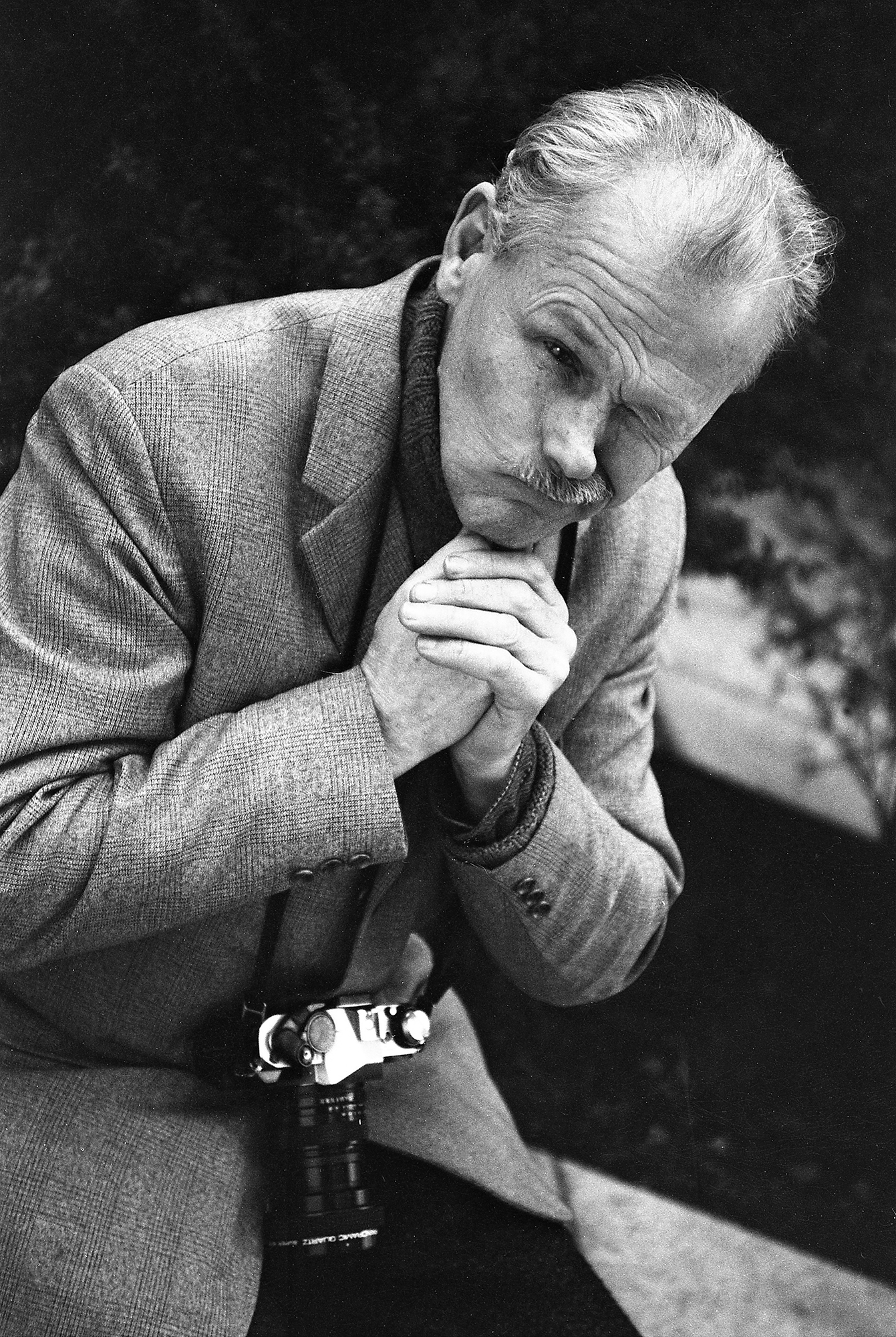
Kalju Suur in 1992

Kalju-Hillar Suur (18 February 1928 Tallinn – 13 November 2013) was an Estonian photographer.

1981-1994 he was photoreporter of the newspaper Sirp ja Vasar.

He established Tallinn Photo Club and the photographical collective Stodom. In 1995 he established the publishing house Suurkalju.

He participated over 150 international photo exhibitions.

Awards:

- 2001: Order of the White Star, V class.
