= Aela Landscape Conservation Area =

Protected area in Estonia

- Location within Estonia
- Location: Estonia
- Coordinates: 58°59′N 25°10′E
- Area: 3,662 ha (9,050 acres)
- Established: 1981 (2007)

Aela Landscape Conservation Area is a nature park situated in Harju and Rapla County, Estonia.

Its area is 3662 ha.

The protected area was designated in 1981 to protect Aela-Viirika bog massives. In 2007, the protected area was redesigned to the landscape conservation area.
