= List of Estonian films before 1991 =

This is a list of most notable films produced in Estonia and in the Estonian language in chronological order.

== 1912–1918 ==
List of Estonian films made in Governorate of Estonia and Governorate of Livonia of the Russian Empire.

| Title | Director | Cast | Genre | Notes |
|---|---|---|---|---|
1912
| Utotškini lendamised Tartu kohal | Johannes Pääsuke | | Documentary | Released on April 30, 1912, by Estonia Film |
| Vaateid Võrumaalt | Johannes Pääsuke | | Documentary | Produced by Estonia Film Tartus |
1913
| Laenatud naene | Unknown | Paul Pinna, Alfred Sällik | Comedy | |
| Estonia Filmi kroonika | Johannes Pääsuke | | Documentary | Produced by Estonia Film Tartus |
| Retki poikki Setunmaan | Johannes Pääsuke | | Documentary | Produced by Estonia Film Tartus |
| Suur lumetuisk Baltimaal jõulukuul 1913 | Johannes Pääsuke | | Documentary | Produced by Estonia Film Tartus |
| Ajaloolised mälestused Eestimaa minevikust | Johannes Pääsuke | | Documentary | Produced by Estonia Film Tartus |
1914
| Karujaht Pärnumaal | Johannes Pääsuke | | Comedy | Short film by Estonia Film |
| Tartu Vabatahtlike Tuletõrjujate Seltsi 50. aastapäeva pidustused | Johannes Pääsuke | | Documentary | Produced by Estonia Film Tartus |
| Tartu linn ja ümbrus | Johannes Pääsuke | | Documentary | Produced by Estonia Film Tartus |

== 1918–1940 ==
List of notable Estonian films made in Republic of Estonia (1918–1940)

=== 1920s ===
| Title | Director | Cast | Genre | Notes |
|---|---|---|---|---|
1921
| Näitus Tallinnas | | | Documentary | Produced by Estonia Film |
1923
| Tallinna sadam | | | Documentary | Produced by Estonia Film |
| Vanaema kingitus | Fjodor Ljubovski | | Comedy | Produced by Regina-Film |
| Must teemant | Fjodor Ljubovski, Jakob Sildnik | | Drama | |
1924
| Mineviku varjud | A. Nugis, Valter Palm | Valdur Tohera, Elsa Silber, Klaara Kruus, Eduard Türk, Woldemar Step, Eduard Ruttoff, Mihkel Lepper, Aleks Lummer, R. Engelberg | Historical drama | Produced by Eesti National Film |
| Õnnelik korterikriisi lahendus | Konstantin Märska | Eduard Pütsep, Olga Liewonen, Kaljo Raag, Jaan Tihkan, Voldemar Kuulbas, Olga Holts | Comedy | Produced by Eesti National Film |
| Eesti linnad: Tartu, Narva, Viljandi Filmikaameraga läbi Eesti 3.osa | | | Documentary | Produced by Estonia Film |
1925
| Tšeka komissar Miroštšenko | Paul Sehnert | Alfred Hindrea, Leoniide Jürisson, Mihkel Lepper, Niina Ormus, Leonid Puhov, Eduard Pütsep, Kaljo Raag, Elsa Silber, Valentine Vassiljeva | Drama | Produced by Eesti National Film |
| Esimese öö õigus | Balduin Kusbock | Mary-Melsas Lukk, René Leer, Heino Vaks, Hartius Möller, Niina Kusbock, Adalbert Kirschberg, Carl Treumundt, Ludmilla Puhmas-Karma, Johannes Jea | Drama | Produced by Taara-Film |
1925
| Kuressaare | | | Documentary | Produced by Estonia Film |
1926
| Filmikaameraga läbi Eesti üheksas osa: Põhja-Eesti | | | Documentary | Produced by Estonia Film |
1927
| Noored kotkad | Theodor Luts | Arnold Vaino, Juhan Nõmmik, Ruut Tarmo, Elly Põder-Roht, Amalie Konsa, Aksella Luts, Rudolf Ratassepp, Olev Reintalu, Vambola Kurg, Juhan Sütiste, August Sunne | Drama | |
| Kevade unelm | Voldemar Päts | Alfred Hindrea, Voldemar Päts, Georg Rusi, Elsa Silber | Tragicomedy | Produced by Film Klubi |
1929
| Dollarid | Mihkel Lepper | Paul Pinna, Signe Pinna | Comedy | |
| Vigased pruudid | Johannes Loop, Konstantin Märska | Joosep Koppel, Karl Laas, Georg Leiesm, Margareta Müller, E. Pessin, Ly Schönberg, Samuel Siirak | Comedy | Produced by Konstantin Märska Filmiproduktsioon |
| Jüri Rumm | Konstantin Märska | Hans Suursööt, Ly Kerge, Boris Jaanikosk, Karl Laas, Mihkel Lepper, Benno Hansen, Salme Peetson, Elsa Silber, Meta Kelgo, Valdur Tohera, Voldemar Päts, Olga Holts, Alfred Hindrea | Adventure | Produced by Konstantin Märska Filmiproduktsioon |

=== 1930s ===
| Title | Director | Cast | Genre | Notes |
|---|---|---|---|---|
1930
| Kuldämblik | Boris Jaanikosk | Olga Torokoff-Tiedeberg, Georg Leies, Aleksander Arder, E. Pessin, Ly Schönberg, Karl Laas, Hendrik Saar, Pritt Veebel, Aino Uiga, Evi Konsa, Paul Kuusik | Musical | Produced by Konstantin Märska Filmproduktsioon |
| Kire lained | Vladimir Gaidarov | Raimondo Van Riel, Vladimir Gaidarov, Hugo Laur, Ita Rina, Jutta Jol, Fritz Greiner, Ernst Falkenberg, Hugo Döblin, Eduard Rebane, E. Garray, Robert Rood, Ants Eskola | Adventure | Produced by A/S Urania (Estonia)/ Wladimir Gaidarow G.m.b.H.(Germany) |
| Pühapäevakütid | Balduin Kusbock | Karl Laas, Ly Schönberg, Georg Leies, Olga Holts | Comedy | Taara-film |
| Vahva sõdur Joosep Toots | Theodor Luts, Arnold Vaino | Arnold Vaino, Linda Vaino, Vambola Kurg, Alfred Knight | Comedy | Produced by Theodor Lutsu Filmiproduktsioon |
| Talwe | | | Documentary | Produced by Eesti Kultuurfilm |
1931
| Öösel | Armas Hirvonen | Karl Laas, Priit Põldroos, Adolf Himbeck, Juhan Nõmmik | Tragedy | Eesti Film Produktion |
| Gaas! Gaas! Gaas! | Theodor Luts | | Documentary | Produced by Theodor Lutsu Filmiproduktsioon |
| Kas tunned maad... | Theodor Luts | | Documentary | Produced by Theodor Lutsu Filmiproduktsioon |
| Ruhno | Theodor Luts | | Documentary | Produced by Theodor Lutsu Filmiproduktsioon |
| Meie läänerannik ja saared | Theodor Luts | | Documentary | Produced by Theodor Lutsu Filmiproduktsioon |
| Kaitseväe töö ja elu | Theodor Luts | | Documentary | Produced by Theodor Lutsu Filmiproduktsioon |
| Kutsu-Juku seiklusi | Voldemar Päts | | Animation | |
1932
| Päikese lapsed | Theodor Luts | Nadezda Peedi-Hoffman, Elfi Lepp-Stroobel, Ants Eskola, Rahel Olbrei | Musical | Produced by Theodor Lutsu Filmiproduktsioon / Suomi Filmi OY |
| Alma Mater Tartuensis (Tartu Ülikool-300) | | | Documentary | Produced by Tartu Ülikool |
1933
| Eesti Kultuurfilmi ringvaade: Tallinna sadama ajalugu nr.8.9 | | | Documentary | Produced by Eesti Kultuurfilm |
| Tallinn- Kaunas- Riia nr.8;9 | | | Documentary | Produced by Eesti Kultuurfilm |
| Riigi Sadamatehas | | | Documentary | Produced by Eesti Kultuurfilm |
1936
| Õielt tarru | | | Documentary | Produced by Eesti Kultuurfilm |
| Eesti Raamat. Pildistusi eesti kirjanduse neljasaja- aastaselt arenguteelt | | | Documentary | Produced by Eesti Kultuurfilm |
| Kalurid nr.81 | | | Documentary | Produced by Eesti Kultuurfilm |
1937
| Eesti mets | | | Documentary | Produced by Eesti Kultuurfilm |
| Ilu- ja tarbeesemete valmistamine kodumaa savist nr.19 | | | Documentary | Produced by Eesti Kultuurfilm |
| Vilsandi linnuriik nr.128 | | | Documentary | Produced by Eesti Kultuurfilm |
1938
| Põlevkivi ja põlevkiviõli tootmine | | | Documentary | Produced by Eesti Kultuurfilm |

== 1940–1991 ==
List of notable films made in the Estonian Soviet Socialist Republic.

=== 1940s ===
| Title | Director | Cast | Genre | Notes |
|---|---|---|---|---|
1947
| Elu tsitadellis | Gerbert Rappaport | Hugo Laur, Aino Talvi, Gunnar Kilgas, Lia Laats, Lembit Rajala, Andres Särev, Betty Kuuskemaa, Rudolf Nuude, Aleksander Randviir, Eduard Tinn, Boris Dobronravov, Johannes Kaljo, Meta Luts | Drama | Lenfilm, based on the 1946 play of the same name by Estonian author and communist politician August Jakobson |

=== 1950s ===
| Title | Director | Cast | Genre | Notes |
|---|---|---|---|---|
1951
| Valgus Koordis | Gerbert Rappaport | Georg Ots, Aleksander Randviir, Valentine Tern, Ilmar Tammur, Rudolf Nuude, Olev Tinn, Elmar Kivilo, Evi Rauer, Hugo Laur, Johannes Kaljola, Franz Malmsten, Lembit Rajala, Arnold Kasuk, Ants Eskola | Drama | Lenfilm, Tallinna Kinostuudio |
1955
| Andruse õnn | Gerbert Rappaport | Enn Adusson, Hugo Laur, Kalju Vaha, Ants Lauter, Ruth Peramets, Lembit Eelmäe, Ita Ever, Linda Tubin, Rudolf Nuude | Drama | Lenfilm |
| Kui saabub õhtu | Aleksandr Mandrõkin | Georg Taleš, Ülo Rannaste, Eike Joasoo, Aaro Pärn, Inge Põder, Sophie Sooäär, Karl Ots, Boris Blinov, Jaan Johanson, Aleksander Mägi, Ants Aasma, Heino Otto, Ilmar Kuusemets, Theodor Puks, Juta Arg | Drama | Tallinna Kinostuudio |
| Jahid merel (Yachts at Sea) | Mikhail Yegorov | Rein Aren, Olev Eskola, Evi Rauer, Ruth Peramets, Endel Nõmberg, Kaarel Karm, Õie Orav, Alfred Kütt, Kaljo Kiisk, Arvo Kruusement, Rudolf Nuude, Lembit Rajala, Aksel Orav, Valdeko Ratassepp, Olev Eensalu, Artur Linnamägi | Drama | Tallinna Kinostuudio |
| Värav nr.2 | Oleg Lentsius | Ruut Tarmo, Linda Sellistemägi-Moor, Aleksander Mägi, Endel Padrik, Jüri Järvet, Mari Möldre-Tarmo, Elle Timmer, Linda Tubin, Voldemar Alev, Endel Pärn, Johannes Kaal | Short Comedy | Kunstiliste and Kroonikafilmide Tallinna Kinostuudio |
1956
| Tagahoovis | Viktor Nevezhin | Ita Ever, Katrin Välbe, Alfred Rebane, Eino Baskin, Kaarel Karm, Hugo Laur, Franz Malmsten, Aleksander Mägi, Evi Rauer, Meta Luts, Olev Eskola, Eve Kivi, Ervin Abel, Erich Jaansoo, Olev Tinn, Aino Talvi, Lisl Lindau, Ado Hõimre, Ilmar Tammur, Johannes Rebane, Anna Tamm, Arno Suurorg, Inna Taarna, Laine Mesikäpp | | |
| Mehed jäävad koju | Igor Yeltsov | Ants Eskola, Linda Rummo, Arvo Tahk, Alfred Mering, Priit Raudkivi, Kulno Raide, Leili Bluumer, Tõnu Naissoo | Short Comedy | |
| Üks moment, oodake! | Virve Reiman | Endel Simmermann, Ilmar Tammur, Truuta Kuusik, Laine Vetka | Short Comedy | |
1957
| Juunikuu päevad | Kaljo Kiisk, Viktor Nevezhin | Andres Särev, Paul Varandi, Astrid Koik, Eva Klink, Paul Ruubel, Heinz Freiberg, Ants Eskola, Rein Mikk, Eha Sikk, Ita Ever, Arvo Kruusement, Hugo Laur, Vello Viisimaa, Roman Baskin | Drama | |
| Pöördel | Aleksandr Mandrõkin | Gunnar Kilgas, Franz Malmsten, Ants Eskola, Katrin Välbe, Ellen Kaarma, Rein Aren, Ants Lauter, Asta Vihandi | Drama | |
1958
| Esimese järgu kapten | Aleksandr Mandrõkin | Boris Livanov, Vladimir Yemeljanov, Mikhail Orlov, Olev Eskola, Ninel Moshkova, Eve Kivi | Historical Drama | Based on the novel of the same name by Alexei Novikov-Priboy. Russian language with Estonian subtitles |
1959
| Vallatud kurvid | Kaljo Kiisk, Yuli Kun | Terje Luik, Rein Aren, Peeter Kard, Eve Kivi, Harijs Liepiņš, Rudolf Nuude, Jaanus Orgulas | Comedy | |
| Veealused karid (Underwater Reefs) | Viktor Nevezhin | Aksel Orav, Agnessa Peterson, Lia Laats, Ants Eskola, Arno Suurorg, Ott Raukas, Aleksander Mägi, Valdo Truve, Karl Ots, Lisl Lindau, Olev Tinn, Voldemar Alev, Aado Hõimre, Katrin Välbe, Lembit Anton, Ants Jõgi, Paul Ruubel | Drama | |
| Kutsumata külalised | Igor Yeltsov | Rein Aren, Heino Mandri, Hilja Varem, Jüri Järvet, Valdo Truve, Ants Lauter, Ants Eskola, Kaarel Karm, Hugo Laur, Voldemar Panso, Aino Talvi, Olev Eskola, Rudolf Nuude, Lisl Lindau | Crime Drama | |

=== 1960s ===
| Title | Director | Cast | Genre | Notes |
|---|---|---|---|---|
1961
| Ühe küla mehed | Jüri Müür | Kaarel Karm, Helend Peep, Einari Koppel, Oskar Liigard, Peeter Kard, Herta Elviste, Aino Seep, Kaljo Kiisk, Mall Sillandi, Arnold Sikkel | Drama | |
1960
| Perekond Männard | Aleksandr Mandrõkin | Paul Ruubel, Evi Rauer, Endel Nõmberg, Juri Bogoljubov, Peeter Volmer, Rudolf Nuude, Hilda Sooper, Terje Luik, Sulev Nõmmik, Asta Vihandi, Jevgeni Vlassov, Olev Eskola, Alfred Mering, Alfred Rebane | Historical drama | |
| Vihmas ja päikeses | Gerbert Rappaport | Jaan Saul, Mikk Mikiver, Eva Murniece, Larisa Luzhina, Jaanus Orgulas, Rein Olmaru, Nikolai Slichenko, Maila Rästas, Lembit Anton, Mati Klooren | Drama | |
1961
| Juhuslik kohtumine | Viktor Nevezhin | Georg Ots, Marina Jurassova, Arved Haug, Lia Laats, Eino Baskin, Alide Bock, Alice Ader, Johannes Kepp, Uno Loop | Musical-Comedy | |
| Laulu sõber | Ilja Fogelman, Reet Kasesalu | Ilmar Tammur, Leili Jäärats, Ramon Keppe, Karl Kalkun, Betty Kuuskemaa, Aino Seep-Breede, Eve Kivi, Valter Soosõrv, Valdeko Ratassepp, Jüri Järvet, Reet Krosman, Endel Nõmberg | Drama | |
| Ohtlikud kurvid | Kaljo Kiisk & Juli Kun | Terje Luik, Rein Aren, Peeter Kard, Eve Kivi, Harijs Liepiņš, Rudolf Nuude, Jaanus Orgulas | Comedy | |
| Ühe küla mehed | Jüri Müür | | Drama | |
1962
| Jääminek | Kaljo Kiisk | Hugo Laur, Sirje Arbi, Helend Peep, Kaarel Karm, Katrin Välbe, Arvi Hallik, Rudolf Nuude, Oskar Liigand, Hilda Sooper, Andres Särev | Historical drama | |
| Õhtust hommikuni | Leida Laius | Viiu Härm, Kirill Lavrov, Ülle Ulla, Aksel Orav | Short drama | |
| Ühe katuse all | Igor Yeltsov | Dzidra Ritenberga, Rein Aren, Viiu Härm, Elsa Ratassepp, Ita Ever, Aino Seep, Rudolf Nuude, Olav Osolin, Jüri Järvet, Paul Rinne, Ines Aru | Drama | |
1963
| Jalgrattataltsutajad | Juli Kun | | Comedy | |
| Jäljed | Kaljo Kiisk | Mati Klooren, Hugo Laur, Kaarel Karm, Paul Ruubel, Rudolf Nuude, Aleksander Sats, Ada Lundver, Sirje Arbi, Rein Aren, Jüri Järvet, Oskar Liigand, Arvi Hallik, Helend Peep, Einari Koppel, Elsa Ratassepp | Drama | |
| Roosa kübar | Veljo Käsper | Herta Elviste, Eneken Aksel | Short drama | |
1964
| Põrgupõhja uus Vanapagan | Grigori Kromanov & Jüri Müür | Elmar Salulaht, Ants Eskola, Astrid Lepa, Leida Rammo, Olev Eskola, Jüri Järvet, Eili Sild | Drama | |
| Null kolm | Igor Yeltsov | | Drama | |
1965
| Me olime 18-aastased | Kaljo Kiisk | Evald Hermaküla, Mare Garšnek, Peeter Kard, Tõnu Aav, Rein Koppelman, Feliks Kark, Tiina Ideon, Einari Koppel, Kaarel Karm, Heino Mandri, Franz Malmsten, Hugo Laur, Ants Eskola, Jüri Müür, Grigori Kromanov | Drama | |
| Mäeküla piimamees | Leida Laius | | Drama | |
| Supernoova | Veljo Käsper | | Drama | |
1966
| Kirjad Sõgedate külast | Jüri Müür | | Drama | |
| Mis juhtus Andres Lapeteusega? | Grigori Kromanov | Einari Koppel, Ita Ever, Heino Mandri, Uno Loit, Kaljo Kiisk, Rein Aren, Ada Lundver, Ants Eskola, Olev Eskola, Hardi Tiidus, Elmar Kivilo, Helgi Sallo, Voldemar Kuslap | Drama | Translated as What Happened to Andres Lapeteus? |
| Tütarlaps mustas | Veljo Käsper | Gerlinda Kopelman, Juozas Budraitis, Lisl Lindau, Viiu Härm, Jüri Järvet, Evald Hermaküla, Ellen Liiger, Peeter Jeret, Ulvi Saalist, Ines Aru, Linda Tubin, Hilja Varem | Drama | |
1967
| Keskpäevane praam | Kaljo Kiisk | | Comedy / Drama | |
1968
| Hullumeelsus | Kaljo Kiisk | Jüri Järvet, Vaclovas Bledis, Valeri Nosik, Bronius Babkauskas, Viktor Plyut, Mare Garshnek, Voldemar Panso, Elvyra Zeberviciute, Harijs Liepiņš | Drama | Produced by Tallinnfilm |
| Inimesed sõdurisinelis | Jüri Müür | Rudolf Allabert, Arvi Hallik, Kalju Komissarov, Heino Raudsik, Kenno Oja, Rein Juurik, Leonhard Merzin, Hans Kaldoja, Tõnu Mikiver, Kiira Kikerpuu, Peeter Kard, Ivalo Randalu, Evald Aavik, Arne Laos, Uno Vark, Paul Kilgas | Period War Drama | Produced by Tallinnfilm; based on the novel Enn Kalmu kaks mina by Paul Kuusberg |
| Libahunt | Leida Laius | Ene Rämmeld, Doris Kareva, Malle Klaassen, Külli Song, Evald Hermaküla, Rein Valter, Arnold Sikkel, Evi Rauer, Elsa Ratassepp, Valter Soosõrv | Drama | (Werewolf) |
| Mehed ei nuta | Sulev Nõmmik | Ervin Abel, Kalju Karask, Voldemar Kuslap, Lia Laats, Ants Lauter, Jüri Makarov, Marika Merilo, Sulev Nõmmik | Comedy | |
| Pimedad aknad | Tõnis Kask | | | |
| Viini postmark | Veljo Käsper | Jüri Järvet, Herta Elviste, Ines Parker, Vladislav Koržets, Alfred Rebane, Fleur Toomla, Paul Ruubel, Einari Koppel, Ervin Abel, Leida Rammo, Mati Klooren, Linda Tubin, Andres Särev | Comedy | |
1969
| Gladiaator | Veljo Käsper | | Drama | |
| Kevade | Arvo Kruusement | Arno Liiver, Riina Hein, Aare Laanemets, Margus Lepa, Ain Lutsepp Leonhard Merzin, Endel Ani, Kaljo Kiisk, Rein Aedma, Kalle Eomois, Heikki Koort, Ervin Abel | Drama | |
| Must nagu mina | Tõnis Kask | Ants Lauter and others | | |
| Viimne reliikvia | Grigori Kromanov | | Adventure | |
| Uksed | Madis Ojamaa | Helgi Sallo, Uno Loop, Boris Lehtlaan, Heli Lääts, Els Himma, Heidi Tamme, Vello Orumets, Urvi Hirvoja, Milvi Tammik | Documentary | |

=== 1970s ===
| Title | Director | Cast | Genre | Notes |
|---|---|---|---|---|
1970
| Elavad mustrid | Andres Sööt | | Documentary | |
| Kolme katku vahel | Virve Aruoja and Jaan Tooming | | Historical Drama | |
| Valge laev | Kalju Komissarov | Enn Kraam, Katrin Kumpan, Kalju Komissarov, Ago Roo, Tõnu Tepandi, Tõnu Mikiver, Einari Koppel, Gunnar Kilgas, Aarne Üksküla, Paul Kilgas, Ellen Alaküla, Ants Lauter | Drama | |
| Varastati Vana Toomas (They Stole Old Toomas) | Semyon Semyonovich Shkolnikov | Kaljo Kiisk, Endel Pärn, Hardi Tiidus, Ülle Koni, Rein Aedma, Vladimir Sapozhnin, Marju Kuut, Els Himma, Katrin Männiko, Einari Koppel, Voldemar Kuslap, Uno Loop, Andres Ots | Musical-comedy | |
1971
| Don Juan Tallinnas | Arvo Kruusement | Gunta Virkava, Julia Sooster, Merle Aru, Lembit Ulfsak, Ants Eskola, Jaak Tamleht, Sophie Sooäär, Tõnu Saar, Silvia Laidla, Eve Kivi, Tõnis Rätsep, Juhan Viiding | Musical-comedy | |
| Tuulevaikus | Veljo Käsper | Lembit Ulfsak, Aime Veskimäe, Malle Pärn, Marge Visnap-Nöps, Helend Peep, Astrid Lepa, Raivo Trass, Jüri Niin, Jüri Järvet, Heino Mandri, Elmar Salulaht, Sophie Sooäär, Ants Jõgi, Mauri Raus | Drama | |
| Inspiratsioon | Valdur Himbek | | Documentary | |
| Metskapten | Kalju Komissarov | Jüri Järvet, Luule Paljasmaa, Katrin Karisma, Enn Klooren, Heino Arus, Enn Kraam, Rudolf Allabert, Margus Tuuling, Ants Ander, Tõnu Miller, Villem Indrikson, Lauri Nebel, Heino Mandri, Rein Aren, Georg Tales, Rolan Bykov, Peeter Jakobi, Ellen Kaarma, Madis Kalmet, Marje Metsur, Katrin Välbe | Drama | |
| Tuuline rand | Kaljo Kiisk | Heino Raudsik, Antanas Barcas, Nijole Lepeškaite, Leila Säälik, Jüri Järvet | Drama | |
1972
| Noor pensionär | Sulev Nõmmik | Ervin Abel, Lia Laats, Helmut Vaag, Leida Rammo, Marika Samussenko, Lisl Lindau | Comedy | |
| Verekivi | Madis Ojamaa | | Adventure | |
| Väike reekviem suupillile | Veljo Käsper | Lembit Ulfsak, Väino Uibo, Ants Eskola, Eve Kivi, Arnold Sikkel, Helend Peep, Mihkel Kivilaan, Ants Müürsepp, Anatoli Lauchkanov, Ita Ever, Gražina Baikštytė, Salme Reek | Historical drama | |
1973
| Maaletulek | Kaljo Kiisk | Leila Säälik, Uldis Pūcītis, Leonhard Merzin, Rolan Bykov, Herta Elviste, Katrin Karisma | Drama | |
| Tavatu lugu | Kalju Komissarov | Kalju Komissarov, Kaljo Kiisk, Kaarel Ird, Jüri Järvet, Elga Terasmägi, Jüri Vlassov, Luule Paljasmaa, Enn Kraam, Ita Ever, Rene Rekand, Linnar Priimägi, Meeli Sööt, Enn Klooren, Ago Saller | Crime drama | |
| Tuli öös | Valdur Himbek | | | |
| Ukuaru | Leida Laius | | Drama | |
| Laulab Tiit Kuusik | Virve Aruoja | | Documentary | |
1974
| Punane viiul | Kaljo Kiisk | | Drama | |
| Ohtlikud mängud | Veljo Käsper | René Urmet, Sven-Erik Nielsen, Viktor Perebeinos, Jüri Järvet, Leonhard Merzin | Drama | |
| Ooperiball | Virve Aruoja | | Documentary | |
| Sillerdav päev | Harri Martinson | | Documentary | |
1975
| Indrek | Mikk Mikiver | | Drama | |
| Värvilised unenäod | Virve Aruoja, Jaan Tooming | Katrin Zilinska, Meelis Küttim, Laur Pihel, Raine Loo, Jaan Tooming, Helene Pihel, Ivo Eensalu | Family | |
| Briljandid proletariaadi diktatuurile | Grigori Kromanov | | Action | |
| Löö vastu | Valentin Kuik | | Drama | |
| Röövpüüdjajaht | Marika Villa | | Drama | |
| Tantsib Tiit Härm | Ülo Tambek | | Documentary | |
1976
| Aeg elada, aeg armastada | Veljo Käsper | Aida Zara, Ita Ever, Väino Uibo, Anne Paluver, Raili Jõeäär, Heino Mandri, Aarne Üksküla, Mati Klooren, Urmas Kibuspuu, Jüri Järvet, Peeter Kard | Drama | (Time to live, time to love) |
| Suvi | Arvo Kruusement | Aare Laanemets, Riina Hein, Margus Lepa, Kaljo Kiisk, Ain Lutsepp, Rein Aedma, Kalle Eomois, Arno Liiver, Kaarel Karm, Ervin Abel, Malli Vällik, Andres Kalev, Marco Meelimäe, Endel Ani. Katrin Välbe, Mare Garšnek, Herta Elviste, Jüri Järvet, Aino Vähi, Kalju Ruuven, Tiina Rääk | Comedy / Drama | |
| Minu naine sai vanaemaks | Virve Aruoja | | Comedy | |
| 10 minutit võitleva ateistiga | Toomas Tahvel | | Drama | |
| Võsakurat | Peeter Simm | | | |
1977
| Karikakramäng | Peeter Simm & Toomas Tahvel | | Drama | |
| Linnutee tuuled (The Winds of the Milky Way) | Lennart Meri | | | |
| Reigi õpetaja | Jüri Müür | Mikk Mikiver, Elle Kull, Evald Aavik, Ita Ever, Eili Sild, Konstantin Kald, Väino Laes, Heino Mandri, Siim Rulli, Ago Saller, Merle Talvik, Külliki Tool | Drama | Based on the novel of the same name by Aino Kallas |
| Surma hinda küsi surnutelt | Kaljo Kiisk | | Drama | |
1978
| Naine kütab sauna | Arvo Kruusement | Ita Ever, Aarne Üksküla, Katrin Välbe, Heino Mandri, Lisl Lindau, Veljo Käsper, Tene Ruubel, Svetlana Orlova, Mati Klooren, Karl Jürgens, Enn Klooren | Drama | |
| Navigaator Pirx | Marek Piestrak | | Sci-Fi | |
1979
| "Hukkunud Alpinisti" hotell | Grigori Kromanov | Uldis Pūcītis, Jüri Järvet, Lembit Peterson, Mikk Mikiver, Kārlis Sebris, Irena Kriauzaitė, Sulev Luik, Tiit Härm, Nijolė Oželytė, Kaarin Raid | Sci-Fi | |
| Kõrboja peremees | Leida Laius | | Drama | |
| Külaline | Elo Tust | | Drama | |
| Siin me oleme! | Sulev Nõmmik | Lia Laats, Ervin Abel, Renate Karter, Karl Kalkun, Eva Meil, Kadri Jäätma, Sulev Nõmmik, Väino Puura, Lauri Nebel | Comedy | |
| Soolo | Raul Tammet | | Sci-Fi | |
| Tuulte pesa | Olav Neuland | | Drama | |
| Õpetaja | Mark-Toomas Soosaar | | Drama | |
| 31. osakonna hukk | Peeter Urbla | | Crime | |

=== 1980s ===
| Title | Director | Cast | Genre | Notes |
|---|---|---|---|---|
1980
| Ideaalmaastik | Peeter Simm | Arvo Kukumägi, Tõnu Kark, Kalju Komissarov, Priit Adamson, Reet Paavel, Aarne Üksküla, Paul Poom, Aire Johanson, Urmas Kibuspuu, Viire Valdma, Helle Kuningas, Ines Aru | Drama | |
| Jõulud Vigalas | Mark-Toomas Soosaar | Evald Aavik, Kersti Kreismann, Jüri Arrak, Linnar Priimägi, Ago Roo, Viktor Balašov, Margus Oopkaup, Omar Volmer, Arvo Kukumägi, Ants Jõgi, Jaan Kaplinski, Ain Kaalep, Peeter Simm, Peeter Urbla, Häli Saarm, Kadriann Soosaar | Drama | |
| Metskannikesed | Kaljo Kiisk | Tõnu Kark, Rudolf Allabert, Aarne Üksküla, Enn Klooren, Robert Gutman, Arvo Kukumägi, Sulev Luik, Jüri Järvet, Tõnu Mikiver, Tõnu Saar, Aleksander Eelmaa | Drama | |
| Suur Tõll | Rein Raamat | | Animation | |
1981
| Pulmapilt | Raul Tammet | | Sci-Fi | |
| Karge meri | Arvo Kruusement | Merle Talvik, Tõnu Kark, Mikk Mikiver, Ita Ever, Raine Loo, Rein Aren, Aarne Üksküla, Lembit Ulfsak, Margus Oopkaup, Arvi Hallik | Drama | |
| Nukitsamees | Helle Karis | Egert Soll, Anna-Liisa Kurve, Ülari Kirsipuu, Ines Aru, Aarne Üksküla, Sulev Nõmmik, Ita Ever, Urmas Kibuspuu, Tõnu Kark, Mari Jüssi, Tanel Kapper, Kaarel Kilvet, Ingrid Maasik, Heiki Moorlat, Mihkel Raud | Family / Musical | Based on the 1920 book of the same title by Estonian author Oskar Luts |
1982
| Pihlakaväravad | Veljo Käsper | | Drama | |
| Teaduse ohver | Valentin Kuik | | Drama | |
| Šlaager | Peeter Urbla | | Musical | |
| Corrida | Olav Neuland | | Drama | |
| Arabella, mereröövli tütar | Peeter Simm | | Drama | |
1983
| Nipernaadi | Kaljo Kiisk | Tõnu Kark, Viire Valdma, Paul Poom, Egon Nuter, Margus Oopkaup, Aire Koop, Katrin Kohv, Rita Raave, Ain Lutsepp, Jüri Järvet, Vilma Luik | Drama | |
| Suletud ring | Peeter Urbla | | Crime | |
| Lurich | Valentin Kuik | | Biography | |
1984
| Reekviem | Olav Neuland | | Drama | |
| Karoliine hõbelõng | Helle Karis | | Family | |
| Hundiseaduse aegu | Olav Neuland | | Adventure | |
| Võõra nime all | Peeter Urbla | | | Produced by Eesti Telefilm |
1985
| Bande | Arvo Kruusement | Tõnu Kark, Aarne Üksküla, Rein Malmsten, Olev Eskola, Mara Zvaigzne, Rita Rätsepp, Tõnu Aav, Enn Kraam, Kaie Mihkelson, Ain Lutsepp, Enn Klooren, Regina Razuma, Jaan Paavle | Crime Drama | Adaptation of the 1930 novel The Glass Key by American writer Dashiell Hammett |
| Kaks paari ja üksindus | Tõnis Kask | | Drama | |
| Puud olid ... | Peeter Simm | Üllar Põld, Maria Avdjuško, Uno Rannaveski, Kärt Hansberg, Margus Terasmees, Kaljo Kiisk, Arvo Kukumägi, Gerardo Contreras, Tõnu Aav, Tõnu Kark, Evald Hermaküla, Urmas Kibuspuu, Peeter Jakobi | Drama | |
| Naerata ometi | Arvo Iho & Leida Laius | Monika Järv, Hendrik Toompere Jr., Tauri Tallermaa, Katrin Tamleht, Kerttu Aaving, Edith-Helen Kuusk, Janika Kalmus, Helle Kuningas, Mari Lill, Evald Hermaküla, Eduard Tinn, Rudolf Allabert | Family Drama | |
1986
| Savoy ball | Ago-Endrik Kerge | | Musical Drama | |
| Saja aasta pärast mais | Kaljo Kiisk | | Biography | |
| Keskea rõõmud | Lembit Ulfsak | Tõnu Kark, Maria Klenskaja, Kaie Mihkelson, Ülle Kaljuste, Lembit Ulfsak, Arvo Kukumägi, Aire Johanson, Hendrik Toompere Jr., Ene Järvis, Heino Mandri, Leida Sibul, Enn Kraam, Vello Janson, Paul Laasik, Väino Laes, Alice Talvik, Merle Talvik, Roman Baskin, Tõnu Kattai | Drama Comedy | |
1987
| Pingul keel | Toivo Elme | | Documentary | |
| Metsluiged | Helle Karis | Katri Horma, Juris Žagars, Ines Aru, Gunnar Kilgas, Liina Orlova, Helend Peep | Family | Based on the Hans Christian Andersen fairy tale The Wild Swans |
| Madude oru needus | Marek Piestrak | | Sci-Fi | |
| Ringhoov | Tõnu Virve | Kaie Mihkelson, Evald Hermaküla | Drama | |
1988
| Vaatleja | Arvo Iho | Erik Roos, Svetlana Tormahova | Drama | |
| Ma pole turist, ma elan siin | Peeter Urbla | Lembit Ulfsak, Madis Kalmet, Gita Ränk, Laine Mägi, Pille Pihlamägi, Heino Mandri, Juhan Raudam, Alice Talvik, Heigo Mirka | Drama | |
| Varastatud kohtumine | Leida Laius | Maria Klenskaja, Andreas Kangur, Kaie Mihkelson, Lembit Peterson, Terje Pennie, Sulev Luik, Hilja Varem, Ita Ever, Leida Rammo, Mari Lill, Paul Poom, Viire Valdma, Hilja Sepp, Helle-Reet Helenurm, Piret Päär | Drama | |
| Nõid | Elo Tust | Ülle Kaljuste, Sulev Luik, Mai Mering, Enn Kraam, Rein Aren, Ott Mägar, Salme Poopuu, Aime Sild, Heino Torga, Merle Jääger | Drama Short | |
| Vernanda | Roman Baskin | Sulev Luik, Jüri Järvet, Ilmar Tammur, Kaljo Kiisk, Vello Janson, Heino Torga, Gunnar Kilgas, Aleksander Eelmaa, Viire Valdma | Drama | |
| Õnnelik lapsepõlv | Jaan Kolberg | Raimo Nõu, Immanuel Volkonski, Terje Pennie, Ada Lundver, Ants Ander, Margus Tabor, Anu Lamp, Sulev Teppart, Jaan Reintam, Imbi Herm, Aleksander Eelmaa, Kiiri Tamm, Georg Janson, Volli Käro, Talvo Pabut | Historical Drama | |
| Doktor Stockmann | Mikk Mikiver | Lembit Ulfsak, Maria Klenskaja, Angelina Semjonova, Evald Hermaküla, Aarne Üksküla, Martin Veinmann, Rein Aren, Mihkel Leesment, Juhan Ulfsak, Ita Ever, Kaljo Kiisk, Erika Kaljusaar, Väino Laes, Mati Klooren, Anu Lamp, Raimo Pass | Historical Drama | Based on the Henrik Ibsen play An Enemy of the People |
1989
| Näkimadalad | Olav Neuland | | Drama | |
| Regina | Kaljo Kiisk | Ülle Kaljuste, Tõnu Kark, Erika Kaljusaar, Ita Ever, Evald Hermaküla, Lembit Ulfsak, Madis Kalmet, Villem Indrikson, Margus Kappel, Rein Aren, Hilja Varem, Viire Valdma, Paul Laasik, Enn Kraam, Raivo E. Tamm | Drama | Based on the 1978 novel Valikuvõimalus by Aimée Beekman |
| Perekonnapildid | Valentin Kuik | Allan Kuljus, Merle Tähe, Andres Raag, Urmas Verliin, Kaili Närep, Margus Varusk | Drama | |
| Inimene, keda polnud | Peeter Simm | Katri Horma, Mari Simm, Tõnu Kilgas, Jüri Krjukov, Rita Raave, Tõnu Raadik, Andres Lepik, Raine Loo, Sulev Luik, Enn Lillemets, Robert Shestakov, Epp Maria Kokamägi, Anne Reemann, Peeter Jakobi, Erich Jaansoo | Historical Drama | |
| Äratus | Jüri Sillart | Tõnu Kark, Sulev Luik, Kaljo Kiisk, Ülle Kaljuste, Väino Laes, Arvo Kukumägi, Anne Paluver, Jaan Rekkor, Mati Klooren, Katrin Kohv | Historical Drama | |
| Pahupidi (Upside Down) | Valeri Blinov | Henio Mandri, Kaljo Kiisk | Drama | |
| Mardipäev | Jaan Kolberg | Liina Tennosaar, Margus Tabor, Mari Lill, Ants Ander, Olli Ungvere, Oskar Liigand, Tarmo Nõu | | |
| Meister | Hannes Lintrop | Andrus Allikvee, Lembit Peterson, Aarne Üksküla | Short | |

=== 1990s ===
| Title | Director | Cast | Genre | Notes |
|---|---|---|---|---|
1990
| Ainus pühapäev | Sulev Keedus | Elmo Nüganen, Kadri Ots, Erik Ruus, Mari Lill, Evald Aavik, Liina Orlova, Paul Poom | | |
| See kadunud tee | Jaan Kolberg | Tarmo Koidla, Ants Ander, Diana Kokla, Raine Loo, Helgi Annast, Ene Rämmeld, Kiiri Tamm, Ago Roo, Hannes Kaljujärv, Lembit Ulfsak, Luule Komissarov, Tõnu Tepandi, Volli Käro, Margus Viil, Terje Pennie | Drama | |
| Sügis | Arvo Kruusement | Margus Lepa, Liina Tennosaar, Anne Reemann, Kaljo Kiisk, Ita Ever, Tõnu Oja, Aare Laanemets, Riina Hein, Ain Lutsepp, Rein Aedma | Comedy-Drama | |
| Ainult hulludele ehk halastajaõde | Arvo Iho | Margarita Terekhova, Mihkel Smeljanski, Hendrik Toompere Jr., Lembit Ulfsak, Hendrik Toompere Sr., Vija Artmane, Maria Avdjuško, Jaan Tätte, Katrin Kohv, Ines Aru, Aire Koop, Marek Eerme | Drama | |
| Teenijanna | Veiko Jürisson | Maria Klenskaja, Hendrik Toompere Jr., Leila Säälik, Ao Peep, Angelina Semjonova, Gert Drui, Evald Hermaküla, Kätlin Trummal, Meeli Sööt, Aarne Üksküla | Drama | |
| Igaühele oma | Hardi Volmer | Andrus Vaarik | Comedy | |
| Rahu tänav | Roman Baskin | Mikk Mikiver, Jüri Järvet, Katrin Karisma, Maria Avdjuško, Lauri Vihman, Arvo Kukumägi, Kaljo Kiisk, Väino Laes, Kersti Kreismann, Helene Vannari, Elisabet Tamm, Tõnu Kilgas, Mihkel Pulk, Laine Mägi, Sulev Luik | Drama | |

== Since 1991 ==
List of Estonian films since 1991
