= Dangerous Curves (1961 film) =

1961 film directed by Juli Kun and Kaljo Kiisk

- Directed by: Juli Kun; Kaljo Kiisk
- Written by: Dagmar Normet; Sándor Stern
- Produced by: Kullo Must
- Starring: Terje Luik; Rein Aren; Peeter Kard; Jaanus Orgulas; Eve Kivi; Harijs Liepiņš
- Cinematography: Edgar Shtyrtskober
- Edited by: Vera Parvel
- Music by: Gennadi Podelski
- Release dates: October 10, 1961 (Moscow, Soviet Union); July 13, 1964 (Tallinn)
- Running time: 114 minutes
- Countries: Estonia; Soviet Union
- Language: Russian

Dangerous Curves (Estonian: Ohtlikud kurvid) is a 1961 Estonian film. It is a remake of the 1959 film Naughty Curves (also known as Mischievous Curves) (Estonian: Vallatud kurvid). The plot revolves around two rival motorcyclists' love for one of the two twin sisters.

The film was shot in Estonia in 1960–61, and released internationally in 1962. It was filmed in the Soviet-designed Kinopanorama format.

In 1999, Fifth Continent Australia Pty Ltd and Vision 146 SARL commissioned the restoration of two reels from the eleven-reel film. These have since been screened at the former New Neon Movies in Dayton, Ohio, the Cinerama Dome in Hollywood, California, and most recently at the Bradford Widescreen Festival on 19 March 2008.

Although plans to restore the remaining reels were abandoned in 2001 due to the project's estimated high cost, the complete three-planel camera negatives and sound elements were restored by Nikolay Mayorov to digital 2K for the Russian State Film Archive Gosfilmofond in 2010. This restoration was screened in Tallinn on 14 November 2015 at the CC Plaza Scape screen and later on ETV, the Estonian national television channel, featuring interviews with the principal actors.

== Plot ==
Old Toomas, the weather vane atop the Tallinn Town Hall spire, knows the townspeople well. To help someone, he recounts a moral tale about sports and love. The story begins when a young woman, Vaike, saves a small dog named Antonio from being run over by the motorcycle of Raivo, a racer who considers all women frivolous and unworthy of his attention. To prove his point, Raivo bets that he can win Vaike’s heart within a week. Unaware of the bet, Vaike accepts Raivo's invitations to spend time together.

Things take a turn when Raivo's acquaintance, Evi, reveals the truth to Vaike’s sister, Maret. Using her striking resemblance to Vaike, Maret steps in to help her sister uncover Raivo’s deceit. Just as Raivo believes he has won the wager, Maret intervenes, forcing him to confront his actions and reconsider his views on love and respect.

== Cast ==
- Terje Luik as Marika / Ellen
- Rein Aren as Raul
- Peeter Kard as Peeter
- Eve Kivi as Evi
- Harijs Liepiņš as Ants
- Rudolf Nuude as Trainer
- Jaanus Orgulas as Peeter
- Ants Eskola as Head of the Sports Union
- Voldemar Panso as Clockmaker
- Inga Piirits as Anni
- Heiki Roots as Tommi
- Erik Kruuk as Boy
