= Olev Eskola =

Estonian actor

Olev Eskola (to 1934 Olaf Esperk; 18 November 1914 – 4 April 1990) was an Estonian actor.

Eskola was born in Tallinn. His older brother was actor Ants Eskola. From 1931 to 1935, and again from 1944 to 1949, he worked at the Estonia Theatre; from 1935 to 1944 and again from 1950 to 1966 at Estonian Drama Theatre; and from 1966 to 1969 in the Estonian Youth Theatre. Since 1969, he was a freelance actor. Besides theatre roles, he has also had a long career in films. Eskola was married to actress Helle Raa. He died in Kassari in 1990.

== Filmography ==
- 1955 Jahid merel
- 1964: Põrgupõhja uus Vanapagan
- 1967: Blasted Hell
- 1969: Gladiaator
- 1970: Kolme katku vahel
- 1974: Ohtlikud mängud
- 1975: Indrek
- 1981: Karge meri
- 1985: Bande
