= Orav =

Family name

Oav is an Estonian surname, translated as "squirrel". It may refer to:

== People ==
- Aivo Orav (born 1965), Estonian diplomat
- Aksel Orav (1929–2003), Estonian actor
- Ivo Orav, former member of Estonian band Vennaskond
- Hans Orav (born 1882), Estoniuan politician
- Kare Orav, married name of Estonian singer Kare Kauks
- Maria Orav (born 1996), Estonian footballer
- Marie Orav (1911–1994), Estonian chess player
- Õie Orav (born 1934), Estonian film historian, scenarist, actress and film director
- Oliver Orav (born 1995), Estonian volleyball player
- Saara Orav (born 2001), Estonian tennis player
- Villem Orav (1883–1952), Estonian historian, teacher, and scholar of pedagogy

== Fictional characters ==
- Ivan Orav, fictional character created by Andrus Kivirähk
