= Varastatud kohtumine =

1988 film directed by Leida Laius

- Directed by: Leida Laius
- Written by: Maria Zverjeva
- Starring: Maria Klenskaja; Andreas Kangur; Kaie Mihkelson; Lembit Peterson; Sulev Luik; Ita Ever; Terje Pennie
- Cinematography: Jüri Sillart
- Edited by: Tiina Lokk
- Music by: Lepo Sumera
- Production company: Tallinnfilm
- Release date: 5 June 1989
- Running time: 97 minutes
- Countries: Estonia; Soviet Union
- Languages: Estonian; Russian

Varastatud kohtumine (English: Stolen Meeting) is a 1989 Estonian drama film directed by Leida Laius.

== Plot ==
Valentina Saar (Maria Klenskaja) has led a troubled life. She knows little about her parents and grew up in an orphanage. After becoming pregnant, she abandons the baby and later ends up in prison. After she is released from prison and returns to Estonia, she begins searching for her young son Jüri (Andreas Kangur). Jüri has also spent his early years in an orphanage and is now living with foster parents Tiina and Ilmar Kuusberg (Kaie Mihkelson and Lembit Peterson), a well-to-do couple living in Tartu. Valentina now believes her life will change for the better once she regains custody of Jüri. When she finally finds her son in Tartu, Valentina has to evaluate both her and Jüri's lives and decide what is in the best interest for Jüri.

== Cast ==
- Maria Klenskaja as Valentina Saar
- Andreas Kangur as Jüri Saar-Kuusberg
- Kaie Mihkelson as Tiina Kuusberg, Jüri's stepmother
- Lembit Peterson as Ilmar Kuusberg, Jüri's stepfather
- Terje Pennie as Milvi
- Sulev Luik as Valter Uibo
- Hilja Varem as Johanna Uibo, Valter's mother
- Ita Ever as Doctor Aimla
- Ninel Järvson as Anna Andrejevna
- Carmen Uibokant as Sirje
- Mihkel Smeljanski as Udo Tamm
- Siiri Sisask as Sirje's friend
- Ada Lundver as Inspector
- Vladimir Laptev as Commandant
- Igor Ivanov as Roman
- Paul Poom as Lembit
- Mari Lill as Asta
- Leida Rammo as Marta Toomingas
- Hannes Kaljujärv as Marta's son

== Awards ==
- 1989: Women in Film (Los Angeles, USA), Grand prix Lilian Gish award to Leida Laius
- 1989: All-Union Actors Festival (Kalinin, USSR), best actress: Maria Klenskaja
- 1990: Festival of Female Film Directors (Venice, Italy), best film
