= Vallatud kurvid =

1959 film directed by Juli Kun and Kaljo Kiisk

- Directed by: Juli Kun; Kaljo Kiisk
- Written by: Dagmar Normet; Sándor Stern
- Starring: Terje Luik; Rein Aren; Peeter Kard; Eve Kivi; Harijs Liepiņš; Jaanus Orgulas; Lembit Anton; Rudolf Nuude; Ants Eskola; Voldemar Panso; Inga Piirits; Heiki Roots; Erik Kruuk
- Cinematography: Edgar Štõrtskober
- Edited by: Vera Parvel
- Music by: Gennadi Podelski
- Production company: Tallinna Kinostuudio
- Release date: December 13, 1959
- Running time: 89 minutes
- Countries: Estonia; Soviet Union
- Language: Estonian

Vallatud kurvid (English: Venturous Curves) is a 1959 Estonian sport and comedy film directed by Juli Kun and Kaljo Kiisk. Priit Raudkivi was the film's first assistant director. In 1961, a remake of this film was made, called Dangerous Curves (Estonian: Ohtlikud kurvid).

== Cast ==
- Terje Luik as Vaike and Maret
- Rein Aren as Raivo
- Peeter Šmakov as Heino
- Eve Kivi as Evi
- Harijs Liepiņš as Ants
- Jaanus Orgulas as Peeter
- Rudolf Nuude as Trainer
- Ants Eskola as Sports club representative
- Voldemar Panso as Person with moustache
- Inga Piirits as Anni
- Heiki Roots as Tommi
- Erik Kruuk as Boy
- Lembit Anton as Olev
- Gunnar Hololei as Reporter
- Ain Jürisson as Raivo's friend
- Milvi Koppel as Vaike's friend
- Ruts Bauman
- Ants Jõgi
