= Õie Orav =

Estonian film historian, scenarist, actress, and film director

Õie Orav (until 1955 Kaasik; born on 16 July 1934, Jõelähtme Parish) is an Estonian film historian, screenwriter, actress and film director.

In 1956, she graduated from Estonian Drama Theatre's educational studio. In 1964, she graduated from Gerasimov Institute of Cinematography. During the period of 1973–1981, she worked at Estonian Television, and in 1981–1985, she was a film history adviser at Estonian Cinema Union (Estonian: Eesti Kinoliit).

== Awards ==
- 2008: annual award by Cultural Endowment of Estonia

== Selected filmography ==
Filmography:

- Tagahoovis. 1955, Tallinna Kinostuudio (role: Karin)
- Andruse õnn. 1955, Lenfilm (actress)
- Jahid merel. 1955, Tallinna Kinostuudio (role: Timka)
- Tagasitulek [about the balerina H. Puur]. Tallinnfilm, 1965 (scenarist)
- Ants Eskola. Eesti Telefilm, 1968 (scenarist with L. Tormis)
- Sündis inimene. Tallinnfilm, 1975 (scenarist)
- 117 hooaeg [about Vanemuine Theatre]. Eesti Telefilm, 1987 (scenarist)
- Hermaküla. Eesti Telefilm, 1988 (scenarist)
- Miliza [videofilm about the opera singer Miliza Korjus]. Väike Orav, 1992 (scenarist, director and producer)
- Tooni [videofilm about the singer Tooni Kroon]. Väike Orav, 1993 (scenarist, director and producer)
- Leonhard [videofilm about the actor Leonhard Merzin]. Väike Orav, 1994 (scenarist, director and producer)
- Puud laulavad, kivid räägivad [film about Rein Aren]. Väike Orav, 1997 (scenarist, director and producer)
- Jaanus Orgulase mälestused 02.-03.09.1998 [film about the actor Jaanus Orgulas]. Eesti Teatri- ja Muusikamuuseum, 1998 (director)
- Orgulas - pilguheit möödunule... [film about the actor Jaanus Orgulas]. 2001 (scenarist, director and producer)
