= Kalju Karask =

Estonian opera and operetta singer and actor

Kalju Karask (28 March 1931 Rakke – 11 August 2011 Tallinn) was an Estonian opera and operetta singer (tenor) and actor.

In 1953 he graduated from GITIS' Estonian studio. From 1953-1959 he worked at the Estonian Drama Theatre, and from 1959-1994 at the Estonia Theatre.

== Awards ==
- 1978: Meritorious Artist of the Estonian SSR
- 1998: Georg Ots prize
- 2001: Order of the White Star, V class.

== Opera roles ==
- Tõnisson (Luts' and H. Luik's "Kevade", 1954)
- Timo (Kivi's and Panso's "Seitse venda", 1956)
- Aavo Koskel (Lall Kahas' "Pähklimägi", 1956)

== Filmography ==
- Andruse õnn (1955)
- Näitleja Joller (1960)
- Põrgupõhja uus Vanapagan (1964)
- Mäeküla piimamees (1965)
- Keskpäevane praam (1967)
- Mehed ei nuta (1968)
