= Olev Tinn =

Estonian actor

- Born: 3 September 1920; Haradok, Byelorussian SSR
- Died: 6 September 1971 (aged 51); Tallinn, then part of Estonian SSR, Soviet Union
- Burial place: Metsakalmistu
- Education: Estonian SSR State Theatre Institute
- Occupation: Actor
- Father: Eduard Tinn

Olev Tinn (3 September 1920 – 6 September 1971) was an Estonian actor.

== Biography ==
Tinn was born on September 3, 1920 in Haradok, Byelorussian SSR (present-day, Belarus) to Eduard Tinn, an Estonian actor and theatre director, and Lydia Tinn.

From 1940 to 1941, Tinn worked at the Ugala Theatre, and from 1944 to 1971 at the Estonian Drama Theatre. In 1950, Tinn graduated from Estonian SSR State Theatre Institute. In 1962, Tinn was awarded Meritorious Artist of the Estonian SSR.

On September 6, 1971, Tinn died aged 51 in Tallinn, Estonian SSR (present-day, Estonia), and is buried in Metsakalmistu.

== Personal life ==
Tinn was the father of the publicist Eduard Tinn (1943–2026).

== Filmography ==
Year	Title	Role	Director	Notes	Ref(s)
1951	Valgus Koordis	Taaksalu	Herbert Rappaport	Based on the novel of the same name by Hans Leberecht	
1957	Tagahoovis	Murkin	Viktor Nevežin	Based on the novel of the same name by Oskar Luts	
1958	Esimese järgu kapten		Aleksandr Mandrõkin	Based on the novel of the same name by Aleksey Novikov-Priboy	
1959	Veealused karid	Värdi	Viktor Nevežin	Based on the novel "Kuhu lähed, seltsimees direktor?" by Aadu Hint	
1960	Läänemere meloodiad		Viktor Nevežin		
1961	Juhuslik kohtumine		Viktor Nevežin		
1964	Põrgupõhja uus Vanapagan		Grigori Kromanov and Jüri Müür	Based on the novel of the same name by A. H. Tammsaare	
1966	Mis juhtus Andres Lapeteusega?		Grigori Kromanov	Based on the novel "Andres Lapeteuse juhtum" by Paul Kuusberg	
