= Enn Kraam =

Estonian actor (1943–2001)

Enn Kraam (born Enn Kram; 20 July 1943, Uusküla – 18 June 2001) was an Estonian stage and film actor.

== Education ==
He completed his secondary education from Rapla Secondary School in 1961 and later completed his bachelor's degree from Tallinn State Conservatory in 1965.

== Career ==
Most of Kraam's career was spent working with the theatre company Noorsooteater based in his home city Tallinn from 1965 to 1992. After that he worked with Ugala Theatre until his death in 2001.

He performed in several radio plays, television production, as well as appearing in some films.

== Selected filmography ==
- 1967 Keskpäevane praam (feature film; role: Boy)
- 1970 Valge laev (feature film; role: Juhan Saks)
- 1971 Metskapten (feature film; role: Antti)
- 1971 Tuuline rand (feature film; role: Pastor)
- 1975 Indrek (feature film; role: Tigapuu)
- 1977 Surma hinda küsi surnutelt (feature film; role: ?)
- 1989 Regina (feature film; role: Karla)
- 1991 Surmatants (feature film; role: Father Eugenio)
- 1991 Vana mees tahab koju (television film; role: Andres Virkov)
- 1992 Lammas all paremas nurgas(feature film; role: Valvur)
- 1993 Suflöör (feature film; role: Father)
- 1994 Tulivesi (feature film; role: Eerik's father)
- 1995 Wikmani poisid (television miniseries; Mr. Markson)
- 1998 Kallis härra Q (feature film; role: Julius)
