= Katrin Välbe =

Estonian actress

Katrin Välbe (until 1929 Jekaterina Poska; 31 October 1904 – 5 July 1981) was an Estonian actress.

Katrin Välbe was born Jekaterina Poska in Võru to Gabriel and Lydia Poska. Her father was a lawyer and her uncles included statesman Jaan Poska, politician Mihkel Poska, and Estonian Apostolic Orthodox Church clergymen Nikolai and Paul Poska.

After graduating from secondary school, she initially enrolled at the University of Tartu in 1922 to study medical sciences, leaving after one year. In 1930, she graduated from the Drama Theatre School in Tallinn, having studied under drama pedagogue Hilda Gleser.

From 1931 until 1944, she worked at Tallinna Töölisteater, from 1945 until 1946 at Noorsooteater, 1946 until 1949 at Estonia Theatre, and from 1949 until 1951 and again from 1952 until 1971 at Estonian Drama Theatre. Besides theatrical roles, she also performed as a film actress beginning in the early 1950s, as well as appearing in radio plays and several television films.

In 1958, Välbe was awarded as Meritorious Artist of the Estonian SSR. She died in Tallinn in 1981 and was buried at Tallinn's Forest Cemetery.

== Selected filmography ==
- 1951 Valgus Koordis (role: Aino's mother)
- 1955 Kui saabub õhtu (role: Inn matron)
- 1955 Andruse õnn
- 1956 Tagahoovis (role: Veika)
- 1957 Pöördel (role: Anu Vett)
- 1959 Veealused karid (role: Mihkel's wife)
- 1959 Vallatud kurvid
- 1960 Vihmas ja päikeses (role: Commandant)
- 1962 Jääminek (role: Maris Jõgel)
- 1966 Ühe suve akvarellid (role: Juula)
- 1968 Pimedad aknad (role: Grandmother Hirlanda)
- 1969 Gladiaator (role: Reet)
- 1971 Tuuline rand (role: Anu)
- 1971 Metskapten
- 1979 Naine kütab sauna (role: Aita)
