= Ruut Tarmo =

Estonian actor and stage director

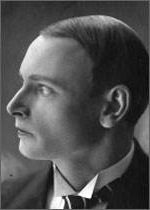
- Ruut Tarmo ca. 1918
- Born: Harald Rudolf Klein; 26 April 1896; Tartu, Estonia
- Died: 28 January 1967 (aged 70); Tallinn, then part of Estonian SSR, Soviet Union
- Occupations: Actor, theatre director
- Years active: 1912–1967
- Spouse: Mari Möldre

Ruut Tarmo (26 April 1896 – 28 January 1967) was an Estonian stage and film actor and stage director whose career spanned more than five decades.

== Biography ==
Ruut Tarmo was born Harald Rudolf Klein in Tartu in 1896 to Julius Klein and Sohvi Klein (née Anja) and he began his career on stages in his hometown in 1912. In 1914 he began an engagement at the prestigious Vanemuine Theatre and would later travel the world's stages (including at least two appearances on London stages with fellow countryman Ants Eskola),. Ruut Tarmo was the stage manager of the Apollo miniature theater in Tallinn from 1917 to 1922. Tarmo worked at the Estonian Drama Theatre in 1922–25, 1928–41, 1949–51, at the Vanemuine in 1925–26, at the theater Rändteater in 1926–28, and in the Estonia Theatre in 1941–49 as a drama actor. In 1927 he would make his film debut in the Aksella Luts and Theodor Luts-penned and directed silent film drama Noored kotkad (English: Young Eagles), which chronicled Estonian soldiers fighting in the Estonian War of Independence from 1918 to 1920.

In November 1951, Tarmo and his wife, actress Mari Möldre, were arrested on charges of performing anti-Soviet repertoire and for anti-Soviet jokes and opinions. Although the reasoning was not very watertight, they were sentenced to ten years in prison with the deprivation of all rights and the confiscation of all property. Tarmo's wife was released after Joseph Stalin's death in July 1954, Tarmo was released from prison in January 1955. After his release, he was forbidden to participate in the arts. Upon the ban being lifted, Tarmo returned to the stage and screen. In 1955, he made his first post-ban film appearance in a comedic short titled Värav nr. 2, directed by Oleg Lentsius.

From 1955 to 1967, Ruut Tarmo worked again at the Estonian Drama Theater. He played also in several television productions and many Estonian films. His last film role was in the feature film Keskpäevane praam (English: Midday Ferry). Tarmo would remain a popular stage and film actor until his death in Tallinn in 1967.

In 1971, his wife would write a posthumous biography of the actor; Ruut Tarmo, published by Eesti Raamat. In 2010, a play titled Mari ja Ruut was performed at the Estonian Drama Theatre which chronicled the lives of Tarmo and wife Mari Möldre during Tarmo's imprisonment.

== Personal life ==
Tarmo was 157 cm tall. His wife was Mari Möldre from 1926, his daughter was actress Lia Tarmo. He was of part Baltic German descent on his father's side.

== Awards ==
- Honored Artist of the Estonian SSR (1959)
- People's Artist of the Estonian SSR (1966)
