= Aino Seep =

Estonian operetta singer, opera soloist, and actress

- Born: 25 February 1925; Tartu, Estonia
- Died: 8 July 1982 (aged 57); Tartu, then part of Estonian SSR, Soviet Union
- Other names: Aino Breede; Aino Seep-Breede
- Occupations: Singer, actress
- Years active: 1948 – 1982
- Spouse: Ago Breede
- Children: Lauri Breede

Aino Seep (25 February 1925 – 8 July 1982) was an Estonian opera and operetta soprano and stage and film actress.

== Early life and education ==
Aino Seep was born in Tartu in 1925 to parents Daniel Seep and Linda Seep (née Klaos). She was one of two siblings. She attended primary and secondary schools in Tartu before enrolling in the Tartu School of Music (now, the Heino Eller Tartu Music School), studying under tenor and teacher Rudolf Jõks, and graduating in 1949.

== Stage career ==
In 1949, shortly after graduating from the Tartu School of Music, Seep joined the Vanemuine theatre as an opera and operetta singer, opera soloist, and stage actress. Seep's first role at the Vanemuine was as Adele, Rosalinde's maid in Johann Strauss II's 1874 operetta Die Fledermaus in 1949. This was followed by a 1950 performance as Susanna, the countess's maid in Mozart's 1786 opera buffa The Marriage of Figaro.

Seep's career onstage at the Vanemuine would span over thirty years. Some of her more notable roles include:

- Musette, Giacomo Puccini's La bohème (1952)
- Gilda, Giuseppe Verdi's Rigoletto (1953)
- Teele, Oskar Luts' Kevade (1953)
- Margarethe, Charles Gounod's Faust (1953)
- Violetta, Giuseppe Verdi's La traviata (1954)
- Vaike, Evald Aava's Vikerlased (1955)
- Norina, Gaetano Donizetti's Don Pasquale (1957)
- Despina, Mozart's Così fan tutte (1959)
- Luisa, Sergei Prokofiev's Betrothal in a Monastery (1962)
- Lola, Pietro Mascagni's Cavalleria rusticana (1963)
- Lieschen, Johann Sebastian Bach's Coffee Cantata (1963)
- Butterfly, Puccini's Madame Butterfly (1966)
- Matilde, Boris Kõrver's Mees pisuhännaga (1968)
- Violante, Mozart's La finta giardiniera (1970)
- Parasja, Yuri Milyutin's Trembita (1973)
- Guadalena, Jacques Offenbach's La Périchole (1974)
- Mesihuul, Valdeko Viru's Kuulsuse narrid (1976)
- Grandmother, Evgeny Schwartz's The Snow Queen (1978)

== Film ==
From 1961, Aino Seep would appear in several Soviet-Estonian feature films; the first of which was the role of Juula in the 1961 Jüri Müür-directed and Aimée Beekman and Vladimir Beekman penned drama Ühe küla mehed for Tallinna Kinostuudio. This was followed by the role of Lidia in the 1962 musical comedy color film Laulu sõber directed by Ilja Fogelman and Reet Kasesalu, also for Tallinna Kinostuudio.

In 1963, Seep appeared in the role of Seppel in the Igor Yeltsov-directed drama Ühe katuse all for Tallinnfilm, which was adapted from the 1958 novel Ühes majas penned by Hans Leberecht. Seep's final film appearance was in a small role in the 1966 Jüri Müür-directed drama Kirjad Sõgedate külast, also for Tallinnfilm, and adapted from works by Estonian writer and poet Juhan Smuul.

== Personal life ==
Aino Seep was married to Ago Breede (1923 – 2000) until her death in 1982. The couple lived in Tartu and had one son; choral conductor and music pedagogue Lauri Breede (born 1957).

== Acknowledgements ==
- Merited Artist of the Estonian Soviet Socialist Republic (1969)
