= Jaak Tamleht =

Estonian actor (1942–1986)

Jaak Tamleht (10 February 1942 – 13 July 1986) was an Estonian actor.

== Education ==
Tamleht was born and raised in Tallinn and graduated from the Tallinn's Old Town School for Adults on 1967. He graduated from the drama school at the Estonian Academy of Music and Theatre in 1972.

== Career ==
Tamleht served as a presenter for Eesti Televisioon. From 1972 to 1976 he worked at the Tallinn City Theatre. From 1982 to 1986 he worked at Vanalinnastuudio.

Tamleht worked on construction sites as a truck and taxi driver when he was not working in entertainment.

== Personal life ==
Tamleht married five times. He died in the village Vihula.

== Selected filmography ==
- Pimedad aknad - 1968
- Don Juan Tallinnas - 1971
