= Elsa Ratassepp =

Estonian stage, radio, and film actress

- Born: 7 March 1893; Raadi-Kruusamäe, Tartu County, Estonia
- Died: 4 May 1972 (aged 79); Tartu, then part of Estonian SSR, Soviet Union
- Occupation: Actress
- Years active: 1912-1972
- Spouse: Rudolf Ratassepp
- Children: Valdeko Ratassepp (1912-1977); Valda Ratassepp-Avasalu (1914-2014)

Elsa Ratassepp (7 March 1893 – 4 May 1972), was an Estonian stage, radio and film actress whose career spanned six decades.

== Early life and career ==
Elsa Ratassepp was born in Raadi-Kruusamäe, a neighbourhood of Tartu. She joined the Vanemuine theatre as an actress in 1916 and was later a founder and actress in the travelling Rändteater based in Tallinn. The Rändteater troupe lasted from 1926 until 1928.

Ratassepp had a long stage career throughout the 1910s and into the late 1960s. However, she didn't make a film appearance until the 1959 Juli Kun and Kaljo Kiisk directed comedy Vallatud kurvid for Tallinna Kinostuudio. This was followed by the role of Triinu in the 1962 Igor Jeltsov directed melodrama Ühe katuse all, based on the novel of the same name by Hans Leberecht. Ratassepp's film career was most prolific in the 1960s. Memorable performances include the role of Mari in the 1963 Kaljo Kiisk directed drama Jäljed; the 1966 Jüri Müür directed drama Kirjad Sõgedate külast; the 1968 Leida Laius directed drama Libahunt, which was based on the play of the same name by Estonian author August Kitzberg; and in the 1968 Jüri Müür directed drama Inimesed sõdurisinelis, based on the novel Enn Kalmu kaks mina, written by Paul Kuusberg.

== Personal life ==
Elsa Ratassepp was married to stage and film actor Rudolf Ratassepp. The couple had two children; son Valdeko Ratassepp, born in 1912, who would also become a stage and film actor; and a daughter, Valda Ratassepp-Avasalu, born in 1914, would become a dancer and actress. Rudolf Ratassepp would die in prison custody in Chelyabinsk, Russia in 1942 while detained by Soviet authorities. Elsa Ratassepp died in 1972 in Tartu, aged 79.

== Acknowledgements ==
- Merited Artist of the Estonian SSR (1958)
