= Jakob Sildnik =

Estonian photographer and filmmaker

- Born: 4 February 1883
- Died: 25 March 1973 (aged 90)

Jakob Sildnik (4 February 1883 – 25 March 1973) was an Estonian photographer and filmmaker, based in Tartu. Together with Fjodor Ljubovski, he directed one of the first Estonian films, the short drama Must Teemant (The Black Diamond), released in 1923.

Sildnik was murdered in 1973, at the age of 90.
