= Karl Kalkun =

Estonian actor

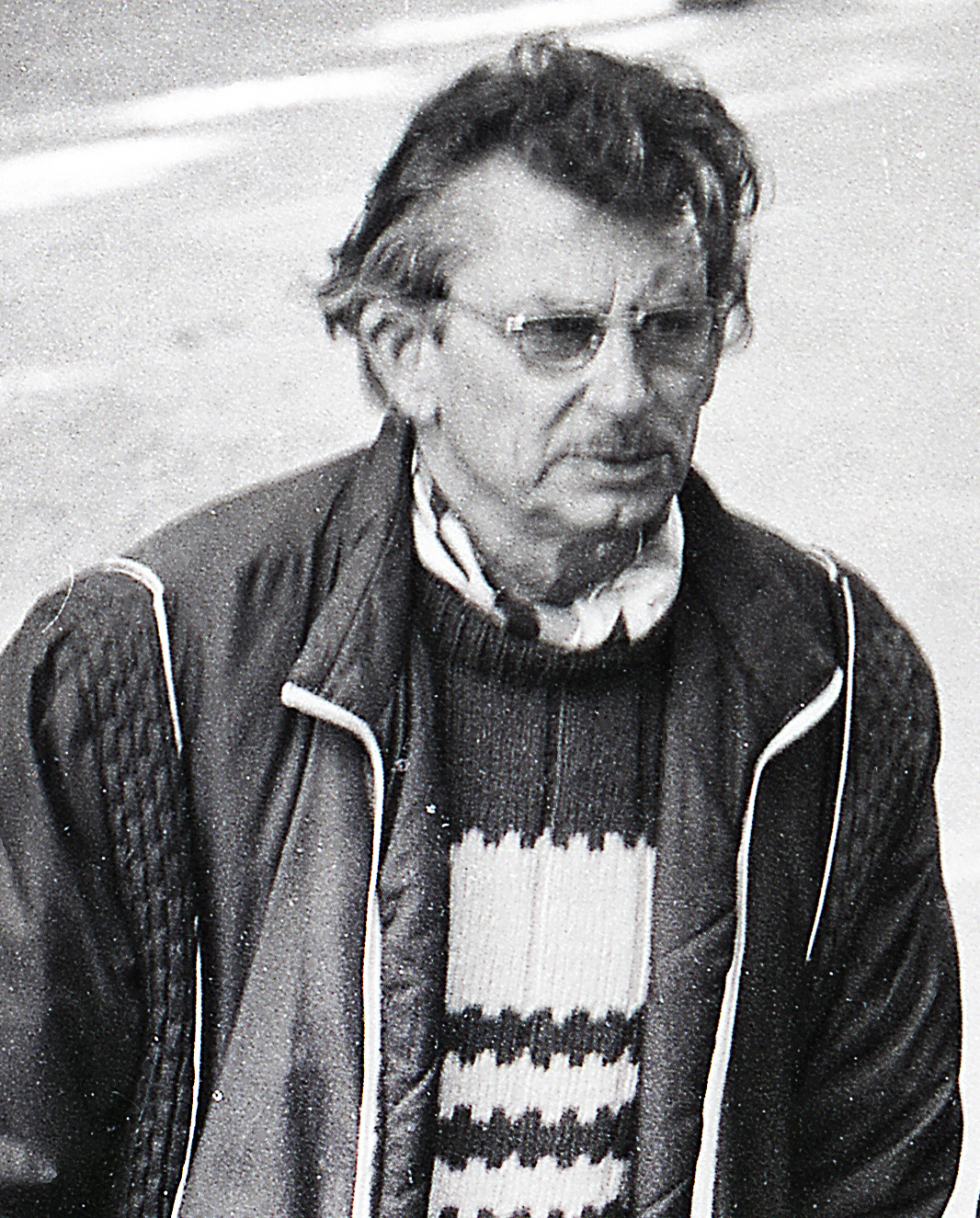
- Born: 9 April 1927; Tartu, Estonia
- Died: 21 February 1990 (aged 62); Tallinn, then part of Estonian SSR, Soviet Union
- Occupation: Actor

Karl Kustav Kalkun (9 April 1927 – 21 February 1990) was an Estonian actor.

== Early life and career ==
Karl Kalkun was born in Tartu as one of three children to. Karl Kalkun Sr., a stage manager of the Vanemuine theatre, and Emma Helene Kalkun (née Engelbär). He was the nephew of discus and hammer thrower Gustav Kalkun. In 1946, he graduated from secondary school at Tartu Secondary School No. 1 (now, the Hugo Treffner Gymnasium). In 1956 he graduated from Tartu State University's department of law.

From 1951 until 1958, he worked at Vanemuine theatre. From 1958 until 1965, he worked at the Estonian Drama Theatre. From 1965 until 1978, he was employed at the Estonian Youth Theatre. From 1978 until 1990, he worked at the Estonia Theatre. Besides theatre roles he played also in several films.

== Personal life and death ==
Kalkun first married Estelle Piirand. The couple had one son, Andres. They later divorced. His second marriage was to Mare Kiisküla, with whom he had two sons, sports journalist Kristjan Kalkun and lawyer Kaarel Kalkun. The couple were still married at the time of his death.

On 21 February 1990, Kalkun was at the Eesti Televisioon (ETV) studios in Tallinn during the filming of Teemaõhtu for an interview and career and life retrospective with journalist and actress Anne Tuuling when he died of a heart attack, aged sixty-two.The episode of the show later aired as "Lõpetamata saade. Karl Kalkun." meaning "Episode without a end. Karl Kalkun" He was interred at Tallinn's Forest Cemetery.

== Awards ==
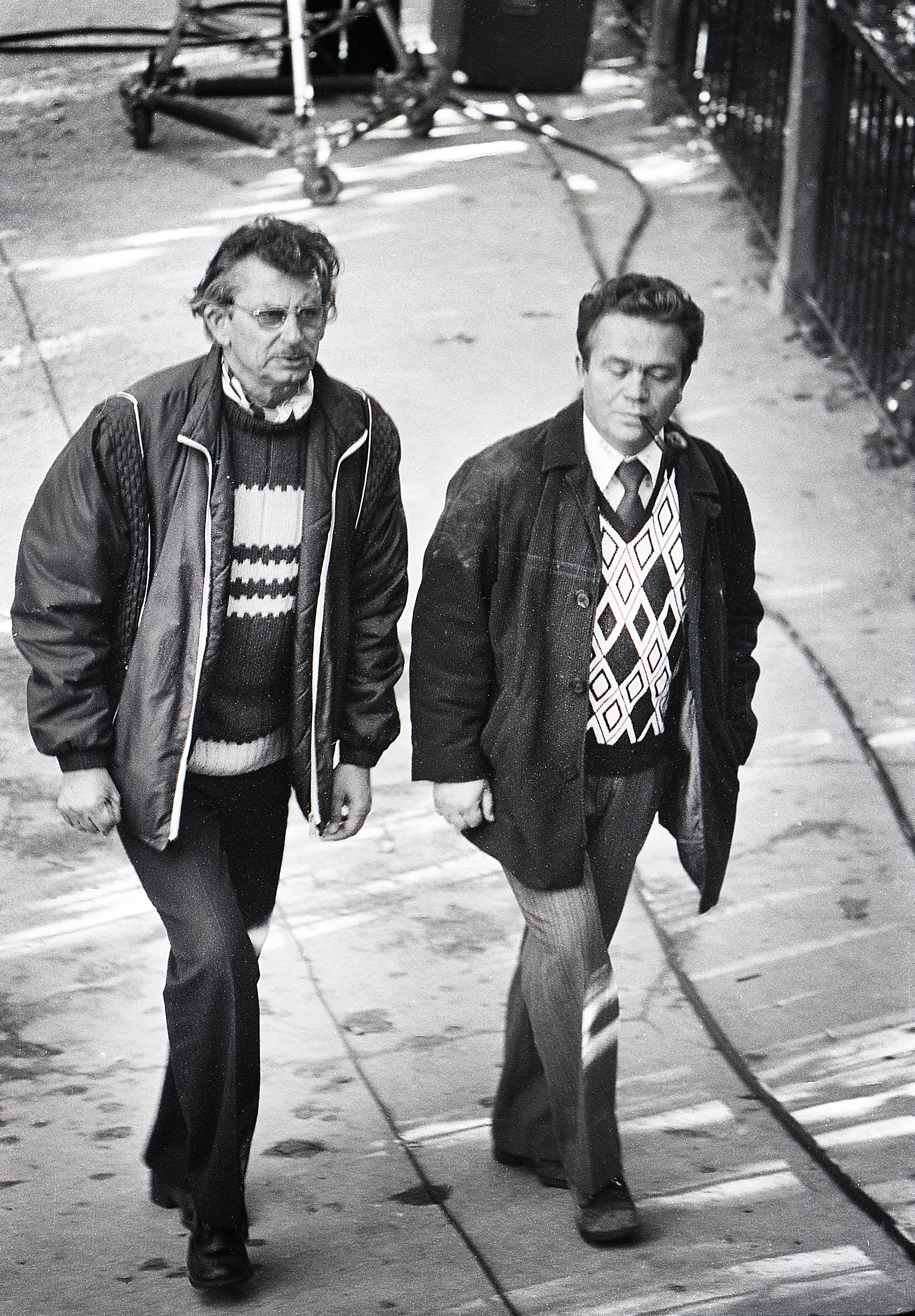
Karl Kalkun (left) and Jaanus Orgulas in 1976

- 1975: Meritorious Artist of the Estonian SSR

== Filmography ==
- 1960: Perekond Männard
- 1961: Laulu sõber
- 1967: Viini postmark
- 1968: Hullumeelsus
- 1969: Viimne reliikvia
- 1970: Tuulevaikus
- 1970: Hamlet
- 1977: Karikakramäng: Tätoveering
- 1978: Siin me oleme!
- 1983: Teatridirektor
- 1986: Õnnelind flamingo
- 1987: Eine murul (animated film; voice)
- 1987: Näkimadalad I jagu
- 1987: Näkimadalad II jagu
- 1988: Näkimadalad IV jagu
