= A Time to Live and a Time to Love =

1977 film by Veljo Käsper

- A promotional poster for the film
- Aeg elada, aeg armastada
- Directed by: Veljo Käsper
- Written by: Hans Luik; Enn Vetemaa
- Produced by: Kullo Must
- Starring: Aīda Zara; Ita Ever; Väino Uibo; Anne Paluver; Aarne Üksküla
- Cinematography: Jüri Sillart
- Edited by: Virve Laev
- Music by: Jaan Rääts
- Distributed by: Tallinnfilm
- Release date: 10 January 1977
- Running time: 84 minutes
- Countries: Estonia; Soviet Union
- Language: Estonian

A Time to Live and a Time to Love (Estonian: Aeg elada, aeg armastada) is a 1976 Estonian drama film directed by Veljo Käsper.

== Plot ==
Frankly frivolous and pretty Deborah gets under the wheels of the car, and then in serious condition is in hospital. Doctor Melts insists on kidney transplantation hopeless patient Professor Talvik, who, in turn, also needs urgent surgery. But the Professor is doing everything possible to save the girl's life.

== Cast ==
- Aīda Zara – Deborah (as Aida Zars)
- Ita Ever – Deborah's mother
- Väino Uibo – Silver
- Anne Paluver – Epp
- Raili Jõeäär – Alla
- Heino Mandri – Professor Talvik
- Aarne Üksküla – Melts
- Mati Klooren – Puudersell
- Urmas Kibuspuu – Pukspuu
- Jüri Järvet – Minister
- Peeter Kard - Photographer Tuus
- Anne Paluver – Epp
- Salme Reek – Janitor
- Ülle Toming – Nurse
- Hilja Varem – Nurse
- Ellen Alaküla – Nurse
