= Armas Hirvonen =

Finnish cinematographer

Armas Hirvonen (25 May 1896 Duderhof, Ingria – 30 September 1972 Helsinki) was an Ingrian Finnish cinematographer.

== Filmography ==
- 1931: Öösel (feature film; director)
- 1937: Juurakon Hulda
- 1938: Niskavuoren naiset
- 1938: Sysmäläinen
- 1938: Vihreä kulta
- 1939: Rikas tyttö
- 1940: Yövartija vain ...
- 1941: Totinen torvensoittaja
- 1944: Anja tulee kotiin
- 1944: Suomisen Olli rakastuu
- 1945: Vastamyrkky
- 1945: Suomisen Olli yllättää
- 1945: Anna Liisa
- 1946: Nuoruus Sumussa
- 1947: Kuudes käsky
- 1948: Tuhottu nuoruus
- 1950: Hukkareissu
- 1951: Hetta nousee tuhkasta
- 1953: Kultaa ja kunniaa
