= Mati Klooren =

Estonian actor and theatre director

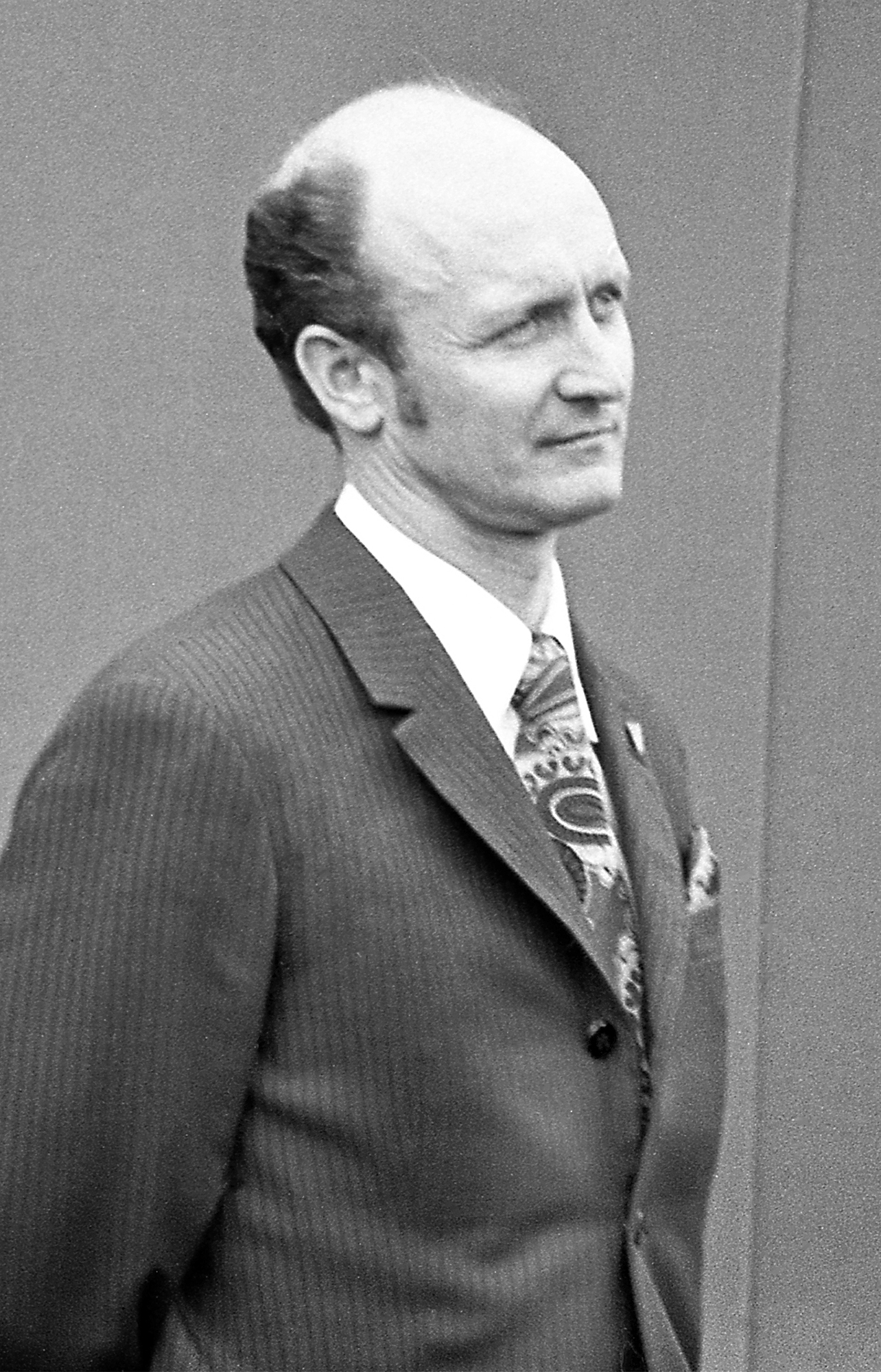
Mati Klooren in 1974

Mati Klooren (31 July 1938 – 16 July 2000) was an Estonian actor and theatre director.

Mati Klooren was born in Tallinn. His younger brother was actor Enn Klooren. In 1961, he graduated from the Tallinn State Conservatory's Performing Arts Department. From 1961, he was an actor at the Estonian Drama Theatre. From 1983 until 1989, he was the head of the Estonian Drama Theatre. Besides theatre roles, he also played in several films.

== Awards ==
- 1969: Meritorious Artist of the Estonian SSR

== Filmography ==
- 1995: Ma olen väsinud vihkamast (role: Guard in booth)
- 1995: Wikmani poisid (role: Mr. Tusam TV Mini Series)
- 1993: Salmonid
- 1992: Lammas all paremas nurgas (role: Harbor guard but uncredited)
- 1991: Vana mees tahab koju
- 1991: Surmatants (role: Lübecki raehärra)
- 1991: See kadunud tee (role: Joodik)
- 1990: Vkhod v labirint (TV Mini Series; role: Kalvin)
- 1989: Äratus (role: Richardi Sass)
- 1989: Doktor Stockmann
- 1986: Gonka veka
- 1984: Rossiya molodaya role: (TV Mini Series; role: Pomoshchnik prokurora)
- 1982: Front v tylu vraga (role: sturmbannführer Zange)
- 1982: Pihlakaväravad (role: Oskar )
- 1979: Naine kütab sauna (role: Martma)
- 1978: Front za liniey fronta (role: Rudolf Zange/Grigoryev)
- 1977: Vremya zhit, vremya lyubit (role: Puudersell)
- 1975: Punane viiul (role: M. Klooren)
- 1973: Tuli öös (role: Saksa ohvitser)
- 1973: Verekivi (role: Sõjakas raehärra)
- 1972: Boy posle pobedy (role: general Gelen)
- 1968: Viini postmark (role: Reporter Juss Redel)
- 1965: Supernoova (role: Valdre)
- 1963: Jäljed (role: Heino Raagen)
- 1960: Vihmas ja päikeses
