= Ervin Abel =

Estonian actor

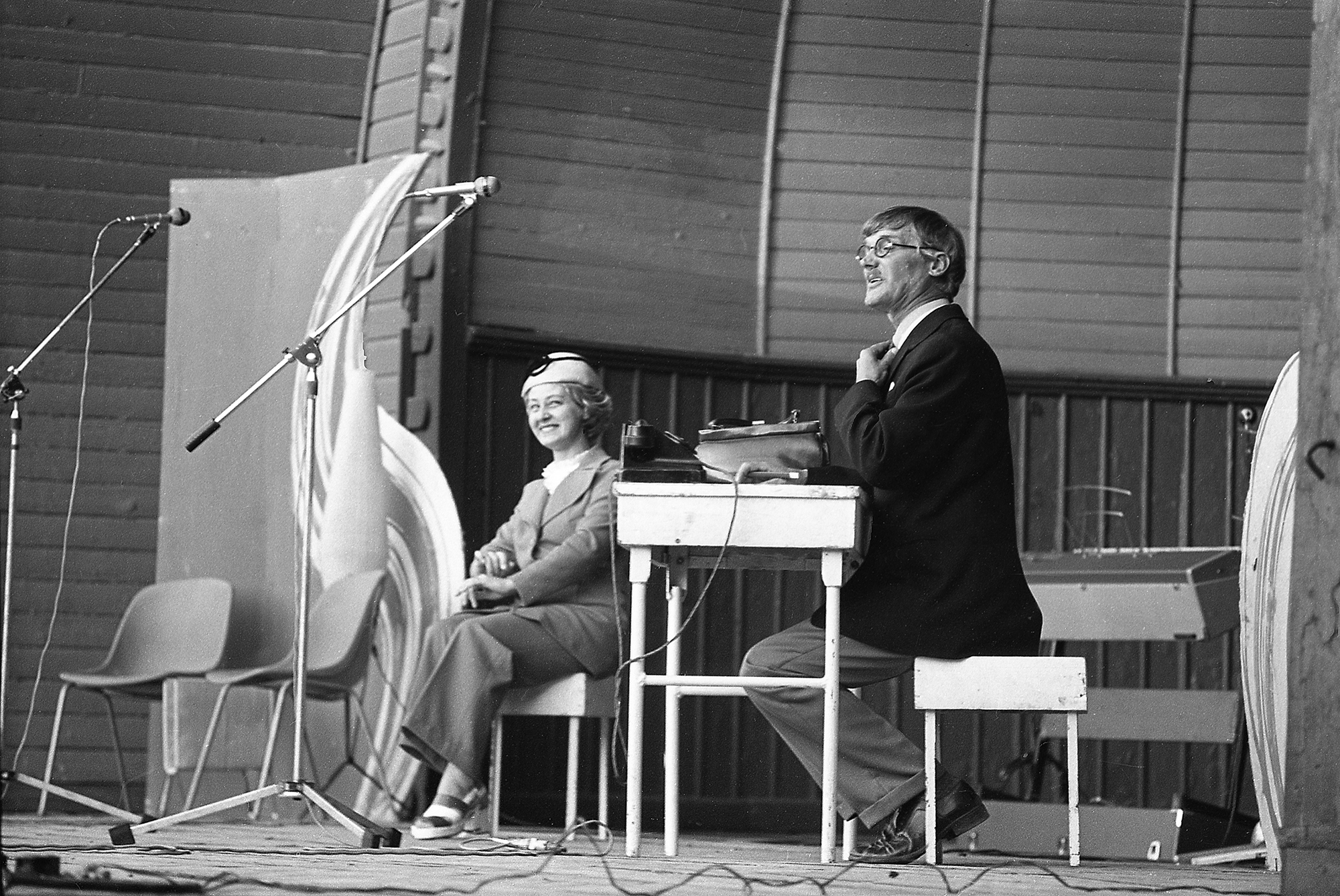
- Ervin Abel in 1974
- Born: November 8, 1929; Narva, Estonia
- Died: March 16, 1984 (aged 54); Tallinn, then part of Estonian SSR, Soviet Union
- Education: GITIS' Estonian studio
- Occupation: actor

Ervin Abel (8 November 1929, Narva – 16 March 1984, Tallinn) was an Estonian actor.

In 1953 he graduated from GITIS' Estonian studio. 1953–1966 he worked at Estonian Drama Theatre and 1966–1984 at Estonian SSR State Philharmonic (nowadays Eesti Kontsert). Besides theatre roles he played also in several films.

== Filmography ==
- 1979: Siin me oleme! (television feature film; in the role: John)
- 1976: Suvi (feature film; in the role: Papa Kiir)
- 1973: Veealused (Short Film)
- 1972: Noor pensionär (television feature film; in the role: Pukspuu)
- 1971: Putukate suvemängud (Short film; role: the voice of Reporter Siki-Triki)
- 1969: Kevade (Spring in english; feature film; in the role: Papa Kiir)
- 1968: Mehed ei nuta (television feature film; in the role: Abel)
- 1968: Viini postmark (role: Tasko)
- 1965: Zhavoronok (The lark in english; role: Sturmbannfuhrer Karl)
- 1964: Põrgupõhja uus Vanapagan (Devil with a False Passport in english; feature film; in the role: Ditchdigger/E. Abel)
- 1957: Tagahoovis
- 1955: Andruse õnn
