= Tõnis Kask =

Estonian film director (1929–2016)

Tõnis Kask (2 December 1929 – 27 August 2016) was an Estonian film and television director and screenwriter.

== Life and career ==
Tõnis Kask was born in Tarvastu Parish, Viljandi County on 2 December 1929. In 1953 he graduated from Lunacharsky State Institute for Theatre Arts' (GITIS) Estonian studio. From 1961 he was the principal director and artistic leader of Tallinn Television Studio (part of Estonian Television). From 1982 to 1984, he worked at Estonian Television, and between 1984 and 1987, he was a director at Tallinnfilm. From 1987 to 1992, he was the chief editor at Eesti Telefilm. Kask died on 27 August 2016, at the age of 86.

== Awards ==
- 2004: Order of the White Star, IV class.

== Filmography ==
- 1958: Sirge ja Särevi Maa ja rahvas
- 1961: Simonovi Neljas
- 1980: Zahradniku Soolo tornikellale
- 1984: Daněki Lugu N linna kirurgiast
- 1985: Arbuzovi Pihtimuste öö
- 1989: Kaugel, ookeani serval
- 1990: Kaugete aegade lugu
- 1991: Vana mees tahab koju
- 1993: Talujutud maa ja taeva vahel
- 2006: Reekviem rukkile?

== Television ==
- 1965–73: Karemäe ja Oidermaa Mis Koosta peres uudist?
- 1976–77: Vahemetsa Sünniaasta
- 1978–80: ja Poliitilised kired
- 1993–2003: Õnne 13
