= Voldemar Kuslap =

Estonian singer (born 1937)

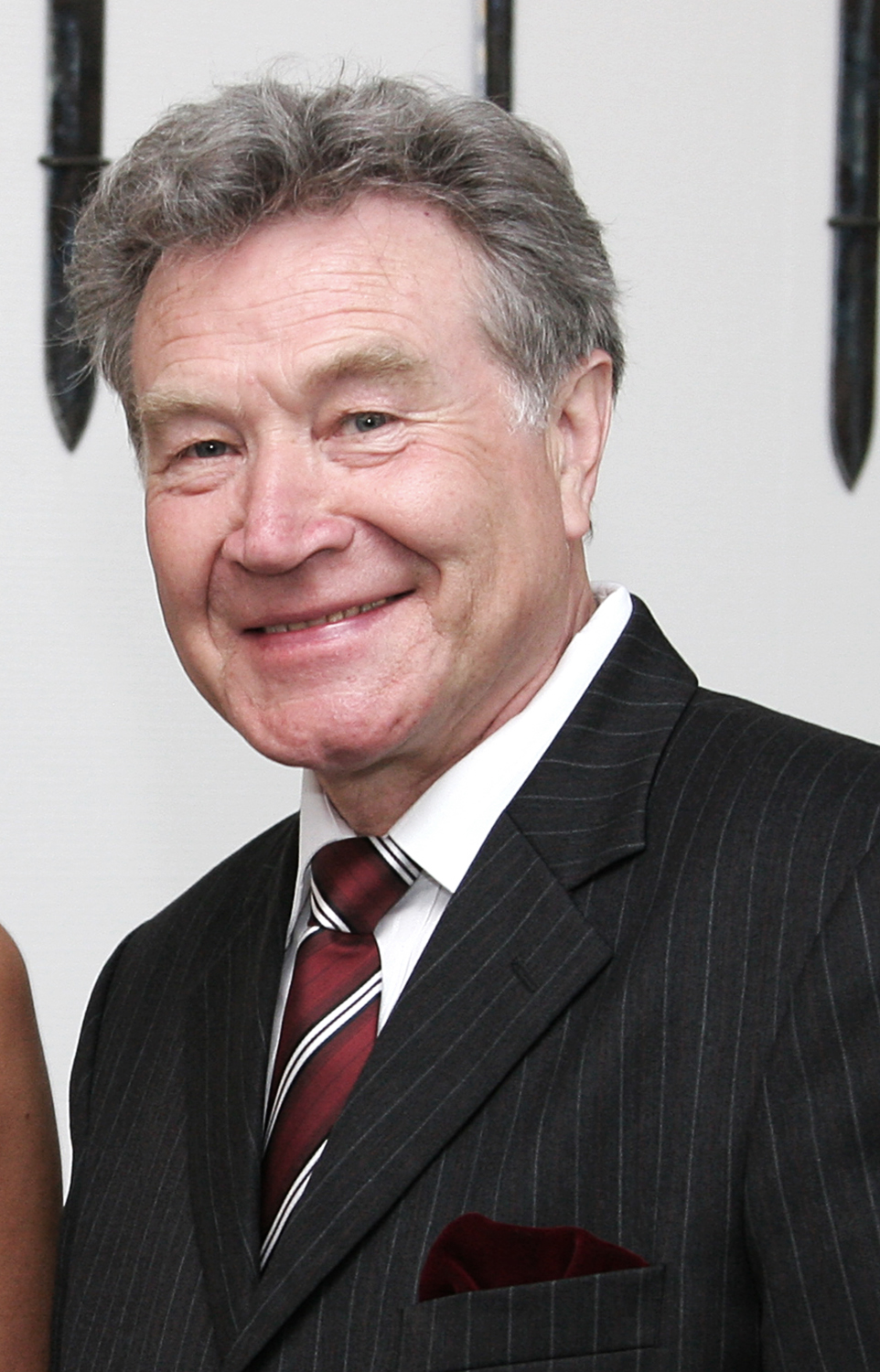
Voldemar Kuslap

Voldemar Kuslap (born 24 September 1937) is an Estonian opera and operetta singer (baritone) and occasional actor.

== Biography ==
He was born in 1937 in the city of Oudova in the RSFSR. In 1968, he graduated from the Tallinn State Conservatory. From 1965 to 2010, he was a soloist at the Estonian National Opera. In total, he has done over 90 roles of opera and operettas. He has also appeared in several feature films, including Mis juhtus Andres Lapeteusega? (1966), Mehed ei nuta (1968), Valge laev (1970), Ooperiball (1974) and several television films and series.

== Awards ==
- 1973: Meritorious Artist of the Estonian SSR
- 1976: Georg Ots Award
- 2001: Order of the White Star, V class.
