= Fjodor Ljubovski =

Estonian filmmaker

Fjodor Ljubovski was an Estonian filmmaker.

Together with Jakob Sildnik, he directed one of the first Estonian films, the short drama Must teemant (literally The Black Diamond), released in 1923. In 1923 he also directed the short feature film Vanaema kingitus.
