= Andres Särev =

Estonian director and actor

Andres Särev (8 February 1902 – 18 March 1970) was an Estonian director and actor.

Särev was born in Paistu, Heimtali Parish (now Viljandi Parish). 1922–1926 he worked at Ugala Theatre, 1926–1928 in Endla Theatre, 1928–1930 in Pärnu Töölisteater, 1930–1940 in Tallinn Töölisteater, 1939–1949 in Estonia Theatre (whereas 1942–1944 its head), 1949–1968 in Estonian Drama Theatre. Besides theatre roles she has played also in several films.

Särev died in 1970 in Tallinn.

== Awards ==
- 1947: Meritorious Artist of the Estonian SSR

== Legacy ==
In Tallinn there is located a memorial museum dedicated to Andres Särev. The museum belongs to Estonian Theatre and Music Museum.

== Filmography ==
- 1947: "Elu tsitadellis"
- 1957: "Juunikuu päevad"
- 1962: "Jääminek"
- 1965: "Me olime 18-aastased"
- 1967: "Viini postmark"
