= Sulev Nõmmik =

Estonian theatre and movie director, actor, humorist and comedian

Sulev Nõmmik (11 January 1931, in Tallinn – 28 July 1992, in Kuressaare) was an Estonian theatre and movie director, actor, humorist and comedian. He's mostly associated with the comical character of Kärna Ärni and the related fictional village of Uduvere (roughly translated as Foggyshire), but he was also influential in writing scripts for several well-known movies, including Mehed ei nuta, Siin me oleme! and Noor pensionär.

== Awards ==
In 1988, Sulev Nõmmik was awarded the Meie Mats.
