= Hugo Laur =

Estonian actor (1893–1977)

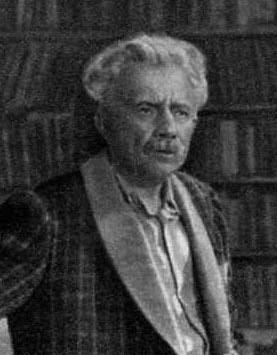
Hugo Laur

Hugo Laur (20 March 1893 – 30 December 1977) was an Estonian actor.

Laur was born in Käru, Simuna Parish, Wierland County (now Lääne-Viru County). 1918-1949 he worked at Estonia Theatre, and 1949–1965 at Estonian Drama Theatre.

1951-1954 he was a member of Supreme Soviet of the Estonian Soviet Socialist Republic.

Laur died in 1977 in Tallinn.

== Selected filmography ==
- 1930 Kire lained (feature film; role: Bratt)
- 1947 Elu tsitadellis (feature film; role: Professor August Miilas, botanist)
- 1951 Valgus Koordis (feature film; role: Saamu)
- 1955: Kui saabub õhtu (feature film; role: Narrator)
- 1955: Andruse õnn (feature film; role: Vaga)
- 1956 Tagahoovis (feature film; role: Soin)
- 1957: Juunikuu päevad (feature film)
- 1959: Kutsumata külalised (feature film; role: Reps)
- 1962 Jääminek (feature film; role: Laas Lautrikivi)
- 1963 Jäljed (feature film; role: Julius Raagen)
- 1963: Jalgrattataltsutajad (feature film; role: Bicycle factory guard)
- 1964: Põrgupõhja uus Vanapagan (feature film; role: Filth hauler)
- 1965: Me olime 18-aastased (feature film; role: Teenus)
- 1968: Hullumeelsus (feature film)
- 1969: Viimne reliikvia (feature film)
- 1970: Valge laev (feature film; role: Jalans)
- 1970: Kolme katku vahel (television film; role: Old Slahter)
- 1971: Tuuline rand (feature film; role: Pime-Kaarli)
