= Life in the Citadel =

1947 film directed by Herbert Rappaport

- Directed by: Herbert Rappaport
- Written by: Leonid Trauberg
- Starring: Hugo Laur; Aino Talvi; Gunnar Kilgas; Lia Laats; Lembit Rajala; Betty Kuuskemaa; Rudolf Nuude; Andres Särev; Aleksander Randviir; Eduard Tinn
- Cinematography: Sergei Ivanov
- Edited by: D. Lander
- Music by: Eugen Kapp
- Production companies: Lenfilm; Tallinna Kinostuudio
- Release date: 6 November 1947
- Running time: 85 minutes
- Countries: Estonia; Soviet Union
- Languages: Estonian; German

Life in the Citadel (Estonian: Elu tsitadellis) is a 1947 Estonian drama and war film directed by Herbert Rappaport and based on the novel of the same name by August Jakobson. This film was the first film which was made in Soviet Estonia.

Awards, nominations, participations:

- 1948: Stalin Prize (USSR), 2nd tier prize to Herbert Rappaport, Hugo Laur, Lia Laats, Lembit Rajala

== Cast ==
- Hugo Laur - Professor August Miilas, a botanist
- Aino Talvi - Eeva Miilas, his wife
- Gunnar Kilgas - Karl Miilas, their son
- Lia Laats - Lydia Miilas, their daughter
- Lembit Rajala - Ralf Miilas, professor's son from his first marriage
- Andres Särev - Dr. Richard Miilas, professor's nephew
- Betty Kuuskemaa - Anna
- Rudolf Nuude - Ants Kuslap
- Aleksander Randviir - Kiinast, carpenter
- Boris Dobronravov - Professor Golovin, a professor of medical science
- Eduard Tinn - Lillak
- Johannes Kaljola - German officer
- Meta Luts - Mrs. Värihein
- Paul Pinna - Worker
- Oskar Põlla - Berens
- Voldemar Panso - Jaan Sander
- Ande Rahe - Lehte
- Anne Lindau - Little Marta
- Kaarel Ird - Western spy
- Ants Eskola - Western spy
- Ants Lauter
- Eduard Türk
