= Maria Avdjuško =

Estonian actress and filmmaker (born 1968)

Maria Avdjuško (also transliterated as Maria Avdjushko; born 9 May 1968) is an Estonian actress, film producer, director and screenwriter.

Avdjuško is the daughter of Russian actor Viktor Avdyushko and Estonian actress Liina Orlova, who is of Russian and Estonian descent. She was born and raised in Tallinn. In 1990 she graduated from Tallinn State Conservatory's performing arts department.

From 1992 until 2014, she was an actress in Estonian Drama Theatre.

== Selected filmography ==
- 1985 Puud olid... (feature film; role: Paabu)
- 1990 Ainult hulludele ehk halastajaõde (feature film; role: Eva)
- 1991 Rahu tänav (feature film; role: Lilka)
- 1991 Ankur (feature film; role: Annabel)
- 1991 Surmatants (feature film; role: Hildegard)
- 1992 Hotell E (animated film; role Mary)
- 1994 Ameerika mäed (feature film; role Ruth)
- 2004 Täna öösel me ei maga (feature film; role: Evelin)
- 2011 Surnuaiavahi tütar (feature film; role: Maria)
- 2015 1944 (feature film; co-producer)
- 2015 Üheotsapilet (television series)
- 2015 The Fencer (feature film; role: Leningrad official)
- 2015 Unditund (documentary film; director and producer)
- 2016 Meeskond (documentary film; producer)
- 2017 Merivälja (television series; role: Margit)
- 2018 Koma (documentary film; director and producer)
- 2018 Paha lugu: Nõiutud (feature film; director)
- 2018 Seltsimees laps (feature film; role: Makajeva)
- 2018 Tuliliilia (feature film; director)
- 2020 Salmonid. 25 aastat hiljem (feature film)
- 2023 Nähtamatu võitlus (feature film)
- 2023 Tume paradiis (feature film)
