= Valgus Koordis =

1951 film directed by Herbert Rappaport

- Directed by: Herbert Rappaport
- Written by: Yuri German (screenplay); Hans Leberecht (novel)
- Cinematography: Sergei Ivanov
- Music by: Eugen Kapp; Boris Kõrver
- Production companies: Lenfilm; Tallinna Kinostuudio
- Release date: August 27, 1951
- Countries: Estonia; Soviet Union
- Language: Estonian

Valgus Koordis (Light in Koordi) is a 1951 Estonian drama film directed by Herbert Rappaport and based on the 1949 novel of the same name by Hans Leberecht.

Awards, nominations, participations:

- 1952: Stalin Prize (USSR), recipients: Herbert Rappaport, Georg Ots, Aleksander Randviir, Valentine Tern, Elmar Kivilo, Evi Rauer, Hugo Laur, Sergei Ivanov

== Cast ==
- Georg Ots as Paul Runge
- Aleksander Randviir as Vao
- Valentine Tern as Aino
- Ilmar Tammur as Muuli
- Rudolf Nuude as Maasalu
- Olev Tinn as Taaksalu
- Elmar Kivilo as Semidor
- Evi Rauer as Roosi
- Hugo Laur as Saamu
- Johannes Kaljola as Priidu
- Franz Malmsten as Janson
- Lembit Rajala as Kurvest
- Arnold Kasuk as Kamar
- Ants Eskola as Känd
