= Keskpäevane praam =

1967 film directed by Kaljo Kiisk

- Directed by: Kaljo Kiisk
- Written by: Juhan Smuul
- Starring: Enn Kraam; Kersti Gern; Ada Lundver; Arne Laos; Kalju Karask; Heino Arus; Eino Tamberg; Lea Unt; Uno Loit
- Cinematography: Jüri Garšnek
- Edited by: Lennart Meri
- Music by: Lembit Veevo
- Production company: Tallinnfilm
- Release date: 29 May 1967
- Running time: 75 minutes
- Country: Estonia
- Language: Estonian

Keskpäevane praam (English: The Midday Ferry) is a 1967 Estonian drama film directed by Kaljo Kiisk.

Awards, nominations, participations:

- 1968: All-Union Film Festival, jury special diploma to the actor Uno Loit
- 1968: Baltic republics, Belarus and Moldavia Film Festival (USSR), diploma and award: "Mioritsa"

== Cast ==
- Enn Kraam - Boy
- Kersti Gern - Girl
- Ada Lundver - Hairdresser Leili
- Eino Tamberg - Lecturer Artur
- Uno Loit - Veteran Müller (disabled)
- Lea Unt - Tiiu
- Arne Laos - Captain
- Kalju Karask - Wheelman
- Heino Arus - Boatswain
- Robert Gutman - Ats
- Rudolf Allabert - Jumbu
- Kalju Komissarov - Boy in Moskvich
- Mare Garsnek - Philologist Reet
- Väino Aren - Fisherman
