= Valdur Himbek =

Estonian actor and film director

Valdur Himbek (31 July 1925 Tallinn – 4 April 1991 Tallinn) was an Estonian film director and actor.

In 1949 he graduated from Estonian State Theatre Institute. From 1950 to 1955 he was expelled to a prison camp in Magadan Oblast. From 1955 to 1991 (with pauses) he was a film director at Estonian Television, and from 1971 to 1973 in Tallinnfilm. Besides his directorial work he played several supporting roles in films.

== Filmography ==
- 1965 "Külmale maale" (with Ants Kivirähk)
- 1966 "Võlg" (Eesti Telefilm)
- 1968 "Katused ja korstnad" (Eesti Telefilm)
- 1971 "Inspiratsioon" (Tallinnfilm)
- 1971 "Tuli öös" (Tallinnfilm)
