= Angelina Semjonova =

Estonian singer and actress (1960–2011)

- Born: 27 February 1960; Kuressaare, then part of Estonian SSR, Soviet Union
- Died: 30 May 2011 (aged 51); Tallinn, Estonia
- Occupations: Singer; actress

Angelina Semjonova (27 February 1960 – 30 May 2011) was an Estonian singer and actress.

Semjonova was born in 1960 in Kuressaare. Her father was a sailor of Chuvash origin and her mother was Estonian. In 1978, she graduated from the Johannes Lauristin 16th Secondary School. In 1984 he graduated from the Tallinn State Conservatory's Department of Performing Arts.

She was engaged as an actress at the Estonian Drama Theatre in Tallinn from 1984 until the mid-1990s, with contracted roles until 2001. In addition, she had appeared in productions at the played in Rakvere Theatre, Kuressaare City Theatre, Endla Theatre in Pärnu and the Vanalinnastuudio as well as in film and on television.

Angelina Semjonova died on 30 May 2011 in Tallinn, aged fifty one, and was buried in Tallinn's Forest Cemetery.

== Filmography ==
- Küljetuul (1983) – Katja
- Saja aasta pärast mais (1986) – Salmonia Telman
- Doktor Stockmann (1989) – Petra Stockmann
- Teenijanna (1990) – Juuli
- Igaühele oma (1990)
- Vana mees tahab koju (1991) – Kadi
- V.E.R.I (1995–1997; television series)
