= Sulev Luik =

Estonian actor (1954–1997)

- Born: April 16, 1954; Kilingi-Nõmme, then part of Estonian SSR, Soviet Union
- Died: June 29, 1997 (aged 43); Kadriorg Park, Tallinn, Estonia
- Burial place: Metsakalmistu, Tallinn, Estonia
- Education: Estonian Academy of Music and Theatre

Sulev Luik (16 April 1954 – 29 June 1997) was an Estonian actor.

In 1976 he graduated from Tallinn State Conservatory. 1976-1988 he worked at Noorsooteater and since 1988 at Estonian Drama Theatre. Besides theatrical roles he played also in over 30 films.

Luik was murdered in Kadriorg Park near his home on 29 June 1997, aged 43. Police arrested three homeless individuals, two men and a woman, in connection with the murder between 17 and 18 August of that year. According to the criminal investigators, the motive for the murder was a quarrel while all four individuals, including Luik, were drinking alcohol in the park. The three individuals charged with Luik's murder were later sentenced to between eight and twelve years in prison. Luik was buried at Tallinn's Forest Cemetery.

Awards:

- 1987: Estonian SSR merited artist
- 1986: Ants Lauter Award

== Selected filmography ==
- 1979 "Hukkunud Alpinisti" hotell (feature film; role: Luarvik)
- 1980 Metskannikesed (feature film; role: Sander)
- 1981 Kaks päeva Viktor Kingissepa elust (television film; role: Voldemar Vöölmann)
- 1982 Corrida (feature film; role: Tarmo)
- 1987 Tants aurukatla ümber (feature film; role: Saaremägi)
- 1988 Vernanda (feature film; role: ?)
- 1988 Varastatud kohtumine (feature film; role: Valter Uibo)
- 1989 Äratus (feature film; role: I Linnamees)
- 1991 Noorelt õpitud (feature film; role: Klorofüll)
- 1991 Rahu tänav (feature film; role: Tiidus)
- 1992 Võlausaldajad (feature film; role: Gustav)
- 1997 Minu Leninid (feature film; role: Zimmermann, Secretary of State Jagow's deputy)
