= Eesti Telefilm =

Film production company based in Estonia

Eesti Telefilm is an Estonian movie studio established in 1956. It is a structural unit of Eesti Televisioon.

In 1965, the studio became independent from ETV.

The studio is produced documentary and live action films. At least 400 documentaries and 250 music films have been produced at the Eesti Telefilm studio.

== Filmography (selection) ==
- 1969 Mehed ei nuta
- 1972 A Young Retiree
- 1979 Siin me oleme!
- 1998 Georgica
