= Maria Klenskaja =

Estonian actress (1951–2022)

- Born: January 29, 1951
- Died: January 6, 2022 (aged 70)
- Occupation: Actress

Maria Klenskaja (29 January 1951 – 6 January 2022) was an Estonian actress.

== Early life and career ==
Klenskaja was born in Tartu and was of Russian parentage. From 1968 until 1970, she worked in the Estonian State Youth Theatre in Tallinn as a make-up artist and in the prop department. In 1974, she graduated from the Tallinn State Conservatory's Performing Arts Department. Since 1974, she had been a contracted actress at the Estonian Drama Theatre. She was also engaged as an actress at the Vanalinnastuudio for one year, beginning in 1989.

Besides theatre roles, she had also had a successful film career and has appeared on television and in radio theatre.

== Personal life and death ==
Klenskaja was in a relationship with actor Aarne Üksküla for over thirty years, until his death in 2017. Klenskaja died on 6 January 2022, aged 70, following a prolonged illness.

== Awards ==
In 1986, she won the Meritorious Artist of the Soviet Union and in 2002 won the Order of the White Star, IV Class.

== Selected filmography ==
- 1985: Naerata ometi
- 1989: Äratus
- 1989: Varastatud kohtumine
- 1990: Sügis
- 1991: Rahu tänav
- 1995: Wikmani poisid (TV miniseries)
- 2006: Vägev võlur
- 2006–2007: Ohtlik lend (TV series)
- 2006: Vana daami visiit
- 2007: Georg
- 2015: Vehkleja
- 2018: Seltsimees laps
- 2020: Vee peal
