= Mehed ei nuta =

1969 film directed by Sulev Nõmmik

- DVD cover
- Directed by: Sulev Nõmmik
- Written by: Enn Vetemaa; Sulev Nõmmik
- Produced by: Eesti Telefilm
- Starring: Ervin Abel; Ants Lauter; Lia Laats; Kalju Karask; Endel Pärn; Leo Normet; Voldemar Kuslap; Helle Juksar; Richard Peramets
- Cinematography: Kaljo Jõekalda; Eino Aas
- Music by: Ülo Vinter
- Distributed by: Eesti Telefilm
- Release date: 1 January 1969
- Running time: 78 minutes
- Countries: Estonia; Soviet Union
- Language: Estonian

Mehed ei nuta (English: Men Don't Cry) is a 1969 Estonian television comedy movie directed by Sulev Nõmmik and written by himself and Enn Vetemaa. The film follows a group of people suffering from insomnia are, under the guise of a resort, moved to a peninsula and subjected to occupational therapy. When they realise the deception, they attempt to leave the fake resort.

== Plot ==
The film begins with a radio announcement about a new state-of-the-art sanatorium designed specifically for insomniacs, offering treatment for those unable to sleep. A group of men, each with peculiar reasons for their sleeplessness, signs up for the program, not necessarily to cure their insomnia but for a break filled with relaxation, music, and the allure of a resort-like environment.

The medical staff quickly realizes that the participants are healthier than they claim. To teach them a lesson, the nurses send the group to an uninhabited island, housing nothing but a dilapidated fisherman's hut, which they present as a special sanatorium branch. The "patients" soon realize the treatment consists of hard labor, fresh air, and no luxuries—a stark contrast to their expectations. The nurses are determined to administer this unconventional cure, drawing inspiration from the idea that "work turns monkeys into men."

Initially, the men rebel, concocting outlandish escape plans involving rafts, swimming attempts, and even romantic manipulations of the staff. Amid the chaos, one participant forms a genuine connection with a nurse, who eventually reveals the truth: they are not on an isolated island but on a peninsula, with the actual sanatorium just a few kilometers away.

== Influence ==
Together with Viimne reliikvia, Siin me oleme! and Noor pensionär, Mehed ei nuta is one of the most culturally influential movies of the Soviet era in Estonia. Particularly memorable is the character of a hypochondriac protagonist, played by Ervin Abel.

== Cast ==
- Ervin Abel as Hypochondriac
- Kalju Karask as Singer
- Endel Pärn as Glutton
- Voldemar Kuslap as Playboy
- Lia Laats as Nurse
- Sophie Sooäär as Farmhouse nurse
- Ants Lauter as Managing director
- Helle Juksar as Young doctor
- Jüri Makarov as Young captain
- Leo Normet as Normet
- Marika Merilo as Girl
- Priit Peramets as Boy
- Sulev Nõmmik as Professor
- Helmut Vaag as Head lifeguard
- Vello Viisimaa as Doctor
- Heino Otto
- Richard Peramets
- Erich Rein
- Ants Jõgi
