= Lurich =

Lurich is a surname. Notable people with the surname include:

- Georg Lurich (1876–1920), Estonian Greco-Roman wrestler and strongman
- Tom Lurich (1897–1968), Polish wrestler
