= Urmas Kibuspuu =

Estonian actor (1953–1985)

Urmas Kibuspuu (5 December 1953 – 13 June 1985) was an Estonian actor.

Kibuspuu was born in Tallinn. In 1976 he graduated from Tallinn State Conservatory Stage Art Department. Since 1976 he worked at Estonian Drama Theatre, intermittently also in Estonia Theatre. Besides theatre roles he appeared in films and on television.

Kibuspuu died in 1985, aged thirty-one, of a brain tumor. He was buried at Tallinn's Forest Cemetery.

== Filmography ==
- 1976: Aeg elada, aeg armastada
- 1980: Ideaalmaastik
- 1982: Arabella, mereröövli tütar
- 1984: Hundiseaduse aegu
- 1984: Karoliine hõbelõng
- 1984: Naksitrallid I
