= Ainult hulludele ehk halastajaõde =

1990 film by Arvo Iho

- Directed by: Arvo Iho
- Written by: Marina Sheptunova
- Produced by: Mati Sepping
- Starring: Margarita Terekhova; Hendrik Toompere Sr.; Hendrik Toompere Jr.; Lembit Ulfsak; Mihkel Smeljanski
- Cinematography: Ago Ruus
- Edited by: Arvo Iho; Marju Juhkum
- Music by: Lepo Sumera
- Production company: Tallinnfilm
- Release date: 18 February 1991
- Running time: 93 minutes
- Countries: Estonia; Soviet Union
- Languages: Estonian; Russian

Ainult hulludele ehk halastajaõde (also known as Halastajaõde; English: Sister of Mercy) is a 1990 Estonian drama film directed by Arvo Iho.

Awards:

- 1991: Monstra Internationale del Film d'Auttore (San Remo, Italy), best actress award: Margarita Terekhova
- 1992: Rouen Nordic Film Festival (France), 1992, best actress award: Margarita Terekhova

== Plot ==
A nurse at a psychiatric hospital, taking pity on an unfortunate young man who was admitted there after attempting suicide due to impotence, cures him. However, her mercy entails harsh consequences.

The film is based on a true story, but it happened not in Estonia, but in Russia. The screenwriter Marina Sheptunova had such a friend. The woman who served as the prototype for the main character was also killed. Director Arvo Iho, having transferred the action to Estonian soil, made all the characters Estonians, but left the main character Rita Russian.

== Cast ==
- Margarita Terekhova as Rita
- Hendrik Toompere Sr. as Olav
- Hendrik Toompere Jr. as Johan
- Mihkel Smeljanski as Viktor
- Lembit Ulfsak as Andres
- Vija Artmane as Siina
- Maria Avdjuško as Eva
- Jaan Tätte as Toomas
- Katrin Kohv as Leida
- Ines Aru as Ilse
- Aire Koop as Marta

== Critical response ==
Iho asks the question: Can love cure everything and if so, do you have to be insane to believe in it? The setting of the movie is a small, banal town where the leading character, a nurse in the town hospital, tries to find an answer to the picture's main problem — charity.
