= Lembit Peterson =

Estonian actor, theatre director, and theatre pedagogue

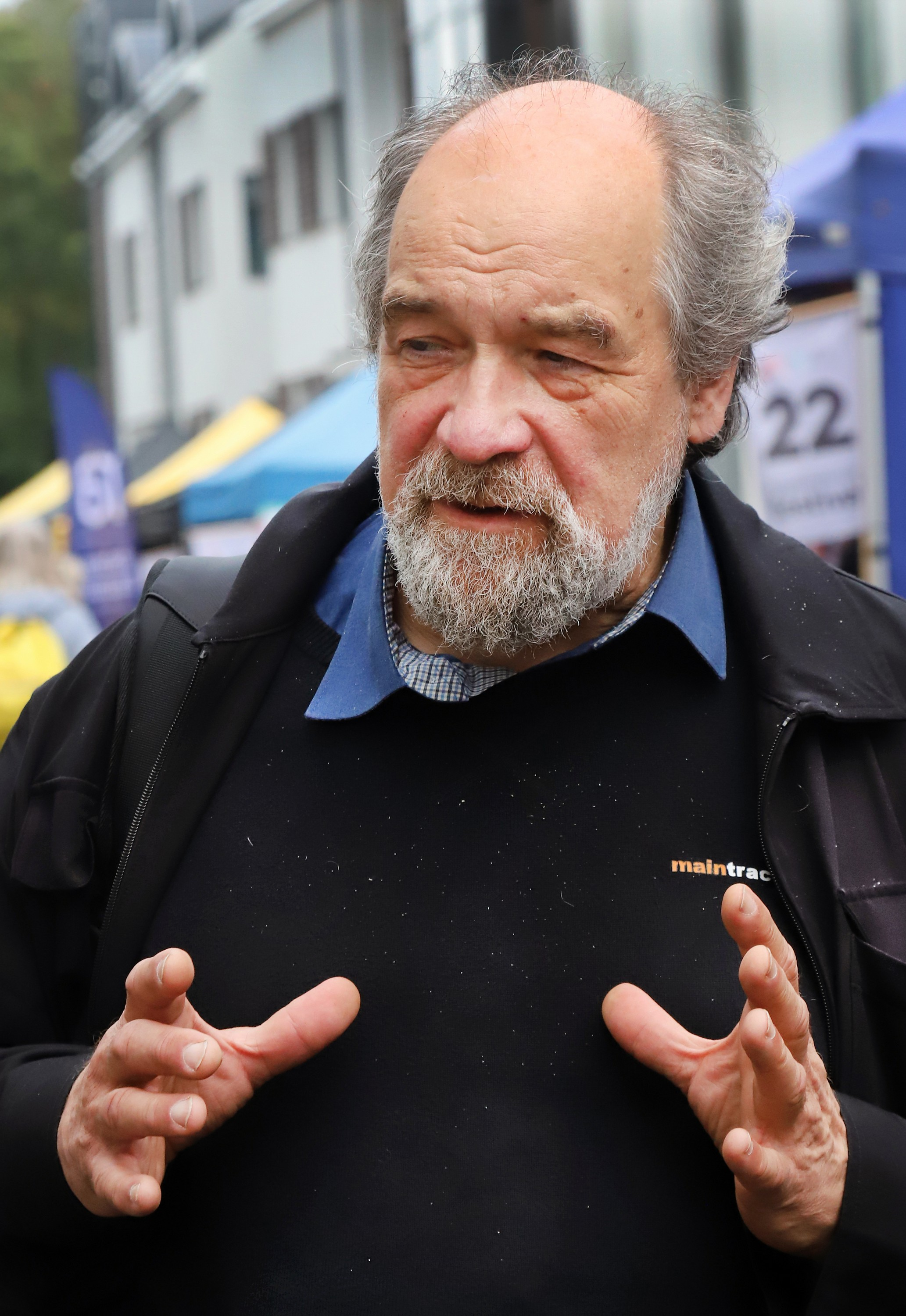
Lembit Peterson (2024)

Lembit Peterson (born 18 August 1953 in Tallinn) is an Estonian actor, theatre director and theatre pedagogue.

In 1971 he graduated from Tallinn State Conservatory's Stage Art Department. From 1976 to 1979 and 1985 to 1988 he worked at Estonian Youth Theatre, and from 1979 to 1982 at Ugala Theatre.

In 1994 he was one of the founders of the studio theatre Theatrum.

Awards:

- 1998: Republic of Estonia cultural prize
- 2006: Order of the National Coat of Arms, IV class.

== Selected filmography ==
- Kõrboja peremees (role: Katku Villu, 1979)
- "Hukkunud Alpinisti" hotell (role: Simon Simonet, 1979)
- Arabella, mereröövli tütar (role: Taaniel Tina, 1982)
- Varastatud kohtumine (role: Ilmar Kuusberg, 1988)
- Seltsimees laps (role: Grandfather, 2018)
