= Siin me oleme! =

1979 film directed by Sulev Nõmmik

- DVD cover
- Directed by: Sulev Nõmmik
- Written by: Enn Vetemaa; Sulev Nõmmik
- Produced by: Eesti Telefilm
- Starring: Ervin Abel; Lia Laats; Karl Kalkun; Kadri Jäätma; Väino Puura; Lauri Nebel
- Cinematography: Enn Putnik
- Music by: Ülo Vinter
- Distributed by: Eesti Telefilm
- Release date: 1 January 1979
- Running time: 67 minutes
- Countries: Estonia; Soviet Union
- Language: Estonian

Siin me oleme! (English: Here We Are!) is a 1978 Estonian comedy film written and directed by Sulev Nõmmik. The script was compiled on Juhan Smuul's motifs from Suvitajad (Estonian for Summer tourists).

== Plot ==
On a beautiful summer day, a capricious Mrs. Kohviveski arrives at a Muhu farm with her husband John from Tallinn, accompanied by the daring Punapea. The group has decided to spend their summer vacation in the beautiful nature, but the antics of the Kohviveski turn the everyday life of the peaceful farm upside down. The family is unable go along with her antics, but reluctantly accept Kohviveski's crazy behavior. Farmer Ärni goes to his friend Aadu to ask for advice on how to understand Kohviveski's spiritual life. Aadu seems to live in a small cabin and appears to be a down-to-earth mutt accompanied by deep life wisdom and attentiveness to people and situations. It is revealed that Punapea, who arrived with the group, has divorced and lived with heartache. She is then supported by the life wisdom and supportive words of his host Ärni.

One evening, Mart and Timmu, sailors of a herring ship, come to visit Liina, the daughter of the family. In their song, however, they make fun of Kohviveski, who decides to sleep at the hayloft for the night. but then gets stuck in the hatch of the hayloft, leading to the villagers hitting her with a bread shovel, sending her flying straight into the soft hay. In the morning, however, Kohviveski cheekily announces that she refuses to get down from the hayloft. The family and the villagers are discussing the matter when Timmu arrives and throws an eel into the hayloft, which Kohviveski thinks is a snake, causing her to jump down next to the animals in the barn.

Punapea doesn't like Kohviveski's behavior towards the family and gives her a bunch of stinging nettles. In the ensuing fight, Kohviveski accidentally hits Ärni's lip with a shoe heel and gets into a fight with Punapea, grabbing her red wig, revealing that the woman is actually a brunette with a male-like haircut.

Meanwhile, Liina and Timmu fall in love and decide to get married. Punapea leaves on vacation, with the suggestion of the host Ärni - to remarry and return to Muhu to see them - in her heart. Kohviveski and John leave the farm but while they're on the road, the car suddenly stops. While John is inspecting the damages, a Volga car stops next to them from which Aadu, whom John had thought was crazy, gives him a business card which shocks John as it turns out that "Aadu" is actually a respected psychiatrist named Aadu Kadakas.

== Influence ==
Together with Viimne reliikvia, Noor pensionär and Mehed ei nuta, Siin me oleme! is one of the most memorable Estonian movies from the Soviet era. Even decades later, Smuul's catchphrases popularised by the movie, such as 'We're from Tallinn, we'll pay!' (Estonian: Me oleme Tallinnast, me maksame!) are widely recognised and recycled by Estonian people.

== Cast ==
- Lia Laats as Kohviveski
- Ervin Abel as John
- Renate Karter as Lõke
- Karl Kalkun as Ärni
- Eva Meil as Ärni's wife
- Kadri Jäätma as Liina
- Sulev Nõmmik as Aadu
- Väino Puura as Mart
- Lauri Nebel as Timmu
