= Karge meri =

1938 novel by August Gailit

- Author: August Gailit
- Language: Estonian
- Publication date: 1938
- Publication place: Estonia

Karge meri (The Harsh Sea) is a novel by the Estonian author August Gailit. It was first published in 1938.

In 1981 the novel was adapted into a film of the same name, directed by Arvo Kruusement and starring Merle Talvik, Tõnu Kark, Mikk Mikiver, Ita Ever, Raine Loo, Rein Aren, Aarne Üksküla, Lembit Ulfsak, Ines Aru, Margus Oopkaup, Salme Reek, Silvia Laidla, and Arvi Hallik.
