= Helend Peep =

Estonian actor and singer

Helend Peep (29 July 1910 – 20 October 2007), born Ernst-Helmut Peep, was an Estonian actor and singer, well known for his performance of "Kerjuse laul" in the musical Ainult unistus.

Peep was born in Vaikla and started his professional career in 1938 and created a long career in the Estonian language Vanemuine theatre of Tartu. He also had roles in several films.

Peep died on 20 October 2007, at the age of 97 years.
