= Enn Klooren =

Estonian actor (1940–2011)

Enn Klooren (21 June 1940 – 26 March 2011) was an Estonian actor.

Klooren was born in Tallinn and grew up in Türi. After graduating the Estonian Academy of Music and Theatre in 1968 Klooren worked in the Estonian Drama Theatre. Since 1989, he lived in Järva County, where he organized, among other things, an amateur theatre.

Klooren has also played in several movies including Metskapten (1971), Toomas Nipernaadi (1983), Karoliine hõbelõng (1984), Tallinn pimeduses (1993), Jan Uuspõld läheb Tartusse (2007) and Kormoranid ehk nahkpükse ei pesta (2011).

Enn Klooren's brother Mati Klooren was also an actor.

== Filmography ==
Year	Title	Role	Notes
1969	Hullumeelsus	Klaasist mees	
1971	Metskapten	Schneider	
1973	Ukuaru	Forest Brother	
1977	Karikakramäng	Meier	(segment "Salakütt")
1979	Naine kütab sauna	Tahkur	
1980	Metskannikesed	Kristjan	
1982	Teaduse ohver	Pajo	
1982	Karge meri	Harmonist	
1983	Toomas Nipernaadi	Ello isa	
1984	Lurich	Jakob	
1984	Karoliine hõbelõng	Kojaülem	
1986	Bande	Whisky	
1993	Tallinn pimeduses	Mihhail	
2002	Agent Wild Duck	Konfident Kapital employee	
2007	Jan Uuspõld läheb Tartusse	Agronoom	
2011	Kormoranid ehk nahkpükse ei pesta	Ben	(final film role)
