= Katrin Kohv =

Estonian actress

Katrin Kohv (born 8 February 1964 in Tallinn) is an Estonian actress.

In 1986 she graduated from Tallinn State Conservatory Stage Art Department. 1986-1990 she worked at Ugala Theatre and 1990-1993 at Vanalinnastuudio. Besides theatrical roles she has also played on several films.

Award:

- 1984: Voldemar Panso award

== Selected filmography ==
- 1983 Nipernaadi (role: Ello)
- 1984 Lurich (role: Hotel maid)
- 1988 Государственная граница. Солёный ветер
- 1989 Äratus (role: Vennaru Linda)
- 1990 Ainult hulludele ehk halastajaõde (role: Leida)
