= Katri Horma =

Estonian actress

Katri Horma (born c. 1970) is an Estonian former actress.

Horma is the daughter of electronics engineer and filmmaker Peet Horma. Her grandfather was sculptor and restorer Paul Horma.

Horma made her film debut in the starring role of Eliise in the Helle Karis directed Tallinnfilm Metsluiged, based on the 1838 Hans Christian Andersen fairy tale The Wild Swans. In 1990, she was cast in the starring role of Imbi Tamm in the Peeter Simm directed historical drama Inimene, keda polnud, also for Tallinnfilm. In 1991, she had a starring role as Nastja in the Abai Karpykov directed Russian-language film Vozdushnyy potseluy. In 1994, she had a prominent role as Kristiina in the Peeter Urbla directed Exitfilm drama Balti armastuslood before deciding to retire from acting.

Following a career as a stage and film actress, Horma retired from the industry to pursue further education. She has since worked in advertising and pursuing a PhD at Tallinn University, Baltic Film, Media, Arts and Communication Institute.

== Filmography ==
- 1987 Metsluiged (role: Eliise)
- 1989 Tuhkatriinu (television film; role: Cinderella)
- 1990 Inimene, keda polnud (role: Imbi Tamm)
- 1991 Vozdushnyy potseluy (role: Nastja)
- 1992 Daam autos (role: The girl on the ferry)
- 1993 Marraskuun harmaa valo (role: Kerrossiivoja)
- 1994 Balti armastuslood (role: Kristiina)
