= Jaan Tooming =

Estonian actor and director (1946–2024)

Jaan Tooming (28 March 1946 – 5 April 2024) was an Estonian actor, theatre and film director and writer.

== Life and career ==
Jaan Tooming was born in Tallinn on 28 March 1946. In 1968, he graduated from the Tallinn State Conservatory (now, the Estonian Academy of Music and Theatre). From 1969 to 2009, he was an actor and stage director in Vanemuine theatre in Tartu. Tooming died on 5 April 2024, at the age of 78.

== Filmography ==
- Kolme katku vahel (1970)
- Lõppematu päev (1971)
- Vasksed käepidemed (1971)
- Värvilised unenäod (1974)
- Karikakramäng: Salakütt (1977)
- Põrgupõhja uus Vanapagan (1977)
- Taevapõdra rahvaste laulud (1978)
- Mees ja mänd (1979)
- Carl Orffi ooper Kuu (1989)
- November (2017)
