= Veljo Käsper =

Estonian film director

- Born: May 13, 1930; Tallinn, Estonia
- Died: March 16, 1982 (aged 51); Tallinn, then part of Estonian SSR, Soviet Union
- Education: Gerasimov Institute of Cinematography
- Occupations: Film director, screenwriter
- Years active: 1960–1981
- Employer: Tallinnfilm

Veljo Käsper (13 May 1930 – 16 March 1982) was an Estonian film director and screenwriter.

In 1964, he graduated from Gerasimov Institute of Cinematography.

Since 1960, he worked at Tallinnfilm.

As a film director, he often dared to experiment with points of view that were not always in line with the will of the communist party ideology that was ruling at the time.

== Filmography ==
- 1974 "Dangerous Games" (feature film; director)
- 1977 "A Time to Live and a Time to Love" (feature film; director)
- 1979 "Strateegia ja reservid" (documentary film; director and screenwriter)
- 1980 "Kutsumus" (documentary film; director and screenwriter)
- 1981 "Pihlakaväravad" (feature film; director and screenwriter)
