= Hilja Varem =

Estonian actress

Hilja Varem (since 1960 Hilja Vee; born on 19 July 1934 in Põltsamaa) is an Estonian actress.

From 1956 until 1959, she worked at Ugala Theatre, from 1959 until 1975 at Endla Theatre, and from 1976 until 1992 at Noorsooteater. Besides theatre roles she has also appeared several films.

Awards:

- 1974: Estonian SSR merited artist

== Selected filmography ==
- 1959 Kutsumata külalised (feature film; role: Hilda)
- 1967 Tütarlaps mustas (feature film; role: Helvi)
- 1969 Gladiaator (feature film)
- 1970 Agu Sihvka annab aru (television film; role: Teacher)
- 1974 Ohtlikud mängud (feature film; role: Old man's mother)
- 1976 Aeg elada, aeg armastada (feature film; role: Dressing room nurse)
- 1981 Karge meri (feature film; role: Huigo's wife)
- 1989 Varastatud kohtumine (feature film; role: Johanna Uibo)
- 1989 Äratus (feature film; role: Nuudimäe Armilde)
- 1990 Regina (feature film; role: Ants' mother)
