= Aksel Orav =

Estonian actor

Aksel Orav (19 February 1929 Alasoo – 28 October 2003) was an Estonian actor.

== Selected filmography ==
- 1959 Veealused karid (feature film; role: Tõnis Hoopkaup)
- 1960 Näitleja Joller (feature film; role: Tagamaa)
- 1960 Vihmas ja päikeses (feature film; role: head of militiaman)
- 1965 Külmale maale (feature film; role: gendarme)
- 1965 Mäeküla piimamees (feature film)
- 1965 Me olime 18-aastased (feature film; role: school teacher)
- 1968 Tädi Rose (feature film; role: Archie Lee)
- 1969 Viimne reliikvia (feature film; role: Siim (his Estonian voice))
- 1981 Kaks päeva Viktor Kingissepa elust. Part I (feature film; role: militiaman)
