= Peeter Kard =

Estonian actor and theatre director

Peeter Kard (born Peeter Šmakov; 2 July 1940 in Tallinn – 4 April 2006 in Pärnu) was an Estonian actor and theatre director.

In 1962, he graduated from Tallinnfilm's educational studio. Since 1963, he had worked at the Endla Theatre.

== Filmography ==
- 1959: Vallatud kurvid
- 1965: Me olime 18-aastased
- 1966: Kirjad Sõgedate külast
- 1968: Inimesed sõdurisinelis
- 1971: Tuuline rand
- 1976: Aeg elada, aeg armastada
- 1981: Pihlakaväravad
- 1994: Jüri Rumm
- 1995: Wikmani poisid
- 1997: Minu Leninid
