= Rudolf Nuude =

Estonian actor

Rudolf Nuude (25 June 1909 – 2 September 1980) was an Estonian actor.

== History ==
Nuude was born in Gdov, Pskov Governorate. From 1931 to 1936, he worked at the Narva Theatre, and from 1936 to 1938 and again from 1949 to 1968 at the Estonian Drama Theatre. From 1938 to 1942, he was engaged as an actor at the Tallinn Workers' Theatre, and from 1942 to 1949 at the Estonia Theatre. He was the uncle of the weightlifter and singer Mati Nuude. Nuude died in 1980 in Tallinn.

== Selected filmography ==
- 1947: Elu tsitadellis (feature film; role: Ants Kuslap, Major of the Soviet Army)
- 1951: Valgus Koordis (feature film; role: Maasalu)
- 1955: Jahid merel (feature film; role: Bobrov)
- 1955: Andruse õnn (feature film; role: Rannap)
- 1959: Juunikuu päevad (feature film; role: Prants)
- 1959: Vallatud kurvid (feature film; role: Coach)
- 1959: Kutsumata külalised (feature film; role: Andres)
- 1960: Perekond Männard (feature film; role: Karl Neider)
- 1960: Näitleja Joller (television film; role: Johannes)
- 1961: Ohtlikud kurvid (feature film; role: Coach)
- 1962: Ühe katuse all (feature film; role: Jaagup)
- 1962: Jääminek (feature film; role: Arvo)
- 1963: Jäljed (feature film; role: Ronk)
- 1965: Me olime 18 aastased (feature film; role: Policeman)
