= Dangerous Games (film) =

1974 film directed by Veljo Käsper

- Directed by: Veljo Käsper
- Written by: Veljo Käsper
- Starring: René Urmet; Sven-Erik Nielsen; Viktor Perebeinos; Leonhard Merzin; Jüri Järvet; Ants Eskola; Rein Aren
- Cinematography: Vladimir Maak
- Edited by: Silvia Kiik
- Music by: Jaan Rääts
- Distributed by: Tallinnfilm
- Release date: August 22, 1974
- Running time: 82 min
- Countries: Estonia; Soviet Union
- Language: Estonian

Dangerous Games (Estonian: Ohtlikud mängud) is a 1974 Estonian film directed by Veljo Käsper and starring Leonhard Merzin and Jüri Järvet. It is also known under its Russian name, Opasnye Igry (Опасные игры).

== Plot ==
The capital of Estonia is occupied by Germans. Three local boys plan to blow up the cinema where German soldiers often spend time. However, their plans change when they accidentally meet a mysterious stranger. A complicated and dangerous game begins where the rules are not set by the schoolkids.

== Cast ==
- René Urmet as old man
- Sven-Erik Nielsen as Tiuks
- Viktor Perebeinos as Trumm
- Jüri Järvet as Õline
- Leonhard Merzin as 2241

== See also ==
- List of World War II films
