= Ada Lundver =

Estonian actress

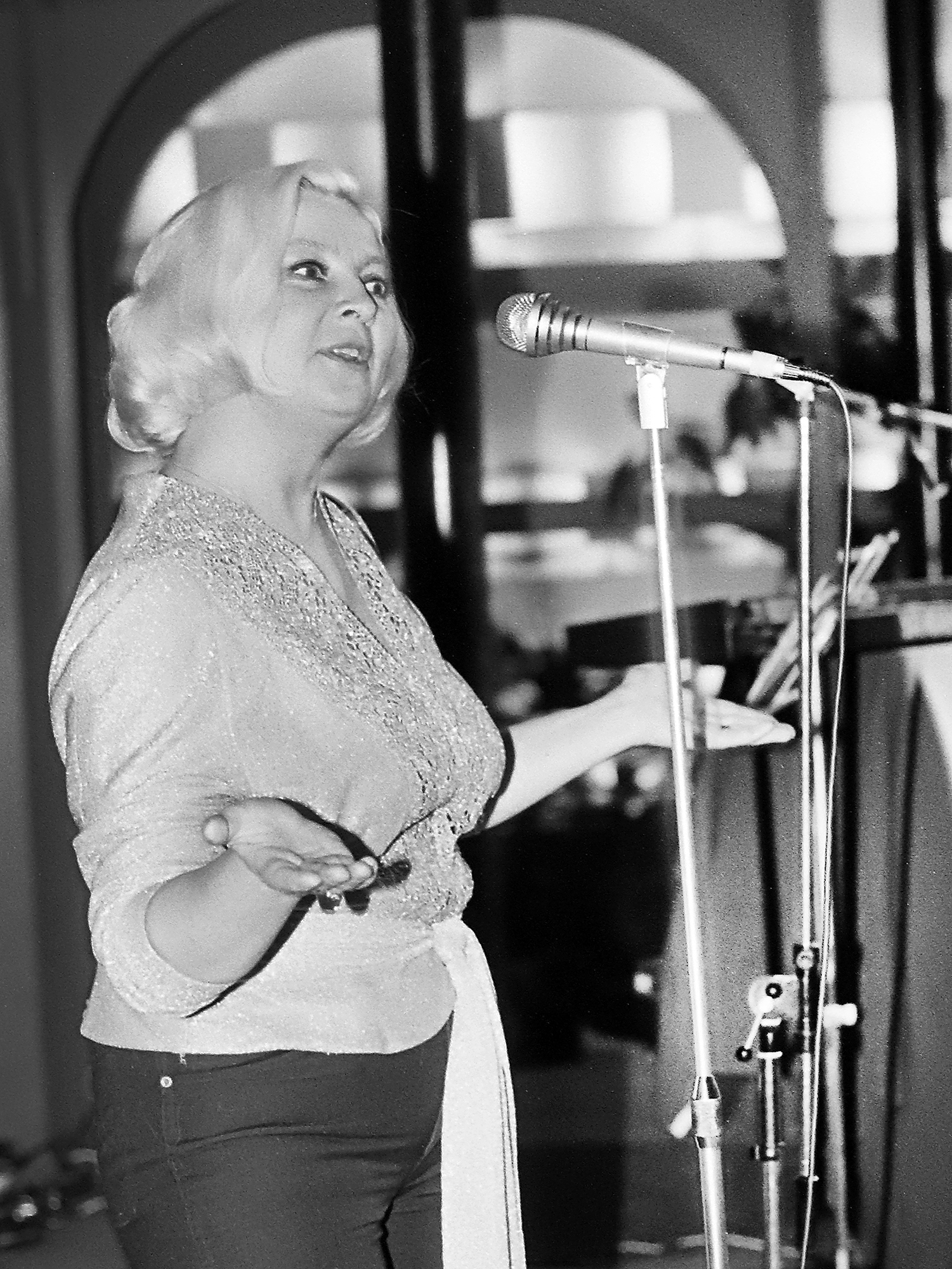
- Lundver in 1985
- Born: 9 February 1942; Käina Parish, Hiiu County, Generalbezirk Estland, Reichskommissariat Ostland
- Died: 6 October 2011 (aged 69); Tallinn, Estonia
- Occupation: Actor
- Spouse: Mikk Mikiver

Ada Lundver (9 February 1942 – 6 October 2011) was an Estonian film actress and media personality. She appeared in nearly thirty films.

== Life ==
Lundver was born in Käina Parish (now, Hiiumaa Parish), on the island of Hiiumaa in 1942. She used to spend each summer on the island with her grandmother.

In 1960 Lundver was working in a shoe factory in Tallinn. The following year, her life was transformed as she was acting with the State Philharmonic of the Estonian SSR. She was chosen from nearly 250 other applicants. She completed a course in pop singing before acting more. She and Eve Kivi became the most well known Estonian actresses. She made films in the 60s, and signed an agreement to make more films in 1969 - becoming the "German slut in Russian movies". She married Mikk Mikiver in 1971 and then made many more films. She made nearly thirty in total including "Cold Land", "What Happened to Andres Lapeteus" and "Noon Barge".

Her marriage to Mikk Mikiver ended in 1983.

Lundver drank a lot after her career subsided. She died in Tallinn in 2011 and was buried at the city's Forest Cemetery beside her husband.
