= Jaanus Orgulas =

Estonian actor (1927–2011)

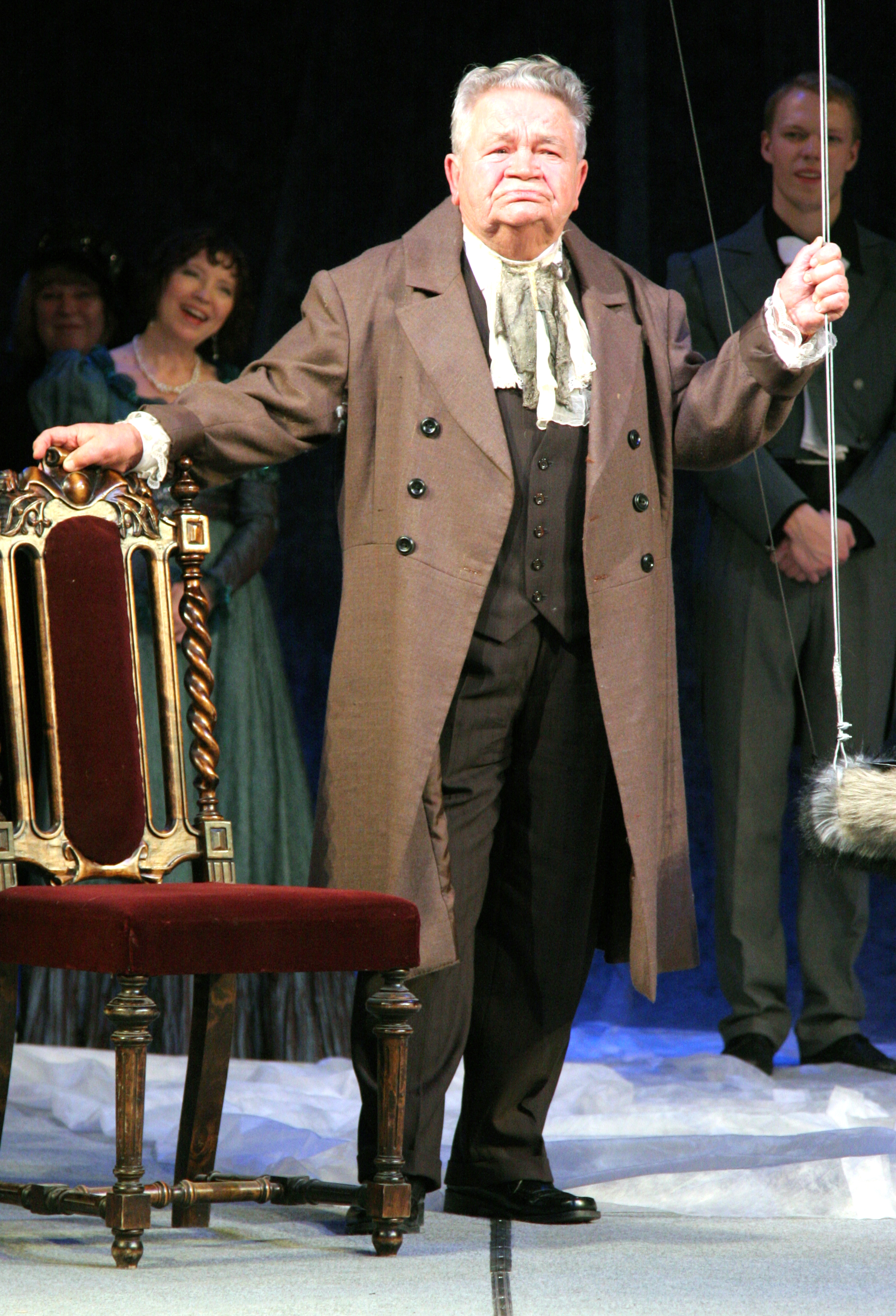
- Orgulas in 2007
- Born: 5 July 1927; Vaivara, Estonia
- Died: 13 August 2011 (aged 84); Tallinn, Estonia
- Education: Lunacharsky State Institute for Theatre Arts
- Occupation: Actor
- Years active: 1953–2006

Jaanus Orgulas (5 July 1927 – 13 August 2011) was an Estonian actor.

== Early life and education ==
Orgulas was born on 5 July 1927 in Vaivara.

In 1953 he graduated from Lunacharsky State Institute for Theatre Arts' (GITIS) Estonian Studio.

== Career ==
From 1953–1966 and 1972–2006 he worked at Estonian Drama Theatre, and 1966–1972 at State Philharmonic Society (now Eesti Kontsert).

== Death ==
He died on 13 August 2011 in Tallinn.

== Selected filmography ==
- 1959 "Vallatud kurvid" (feature film; role: ?)
- 1960 "Vihmas ja päikeses" (feature film; role: ?)
- 1961 "Ohtlikud kurvid" (feature film; role: ?)
