= Jüri Müür =

Estonian film director and scenarist

Jüri Müür (born 7 January 1929, Tartu – 17 November 1984) is an Estonian film director, screenwriter and actor.

In 1960 he graduated from Gerasimov Institute of Cinematography.

== Filmography ==
- 1961: Ühe küla mehed (feature film; director)
- 1964: Põrgupõhja uus Vanapagan (feature film; director)
- 1968: Inimesed sõdurisinelis (feature film; director)
- 1977: Reigi õpetaja (feature film; director)
