= Rein Aren =

Estonian actor

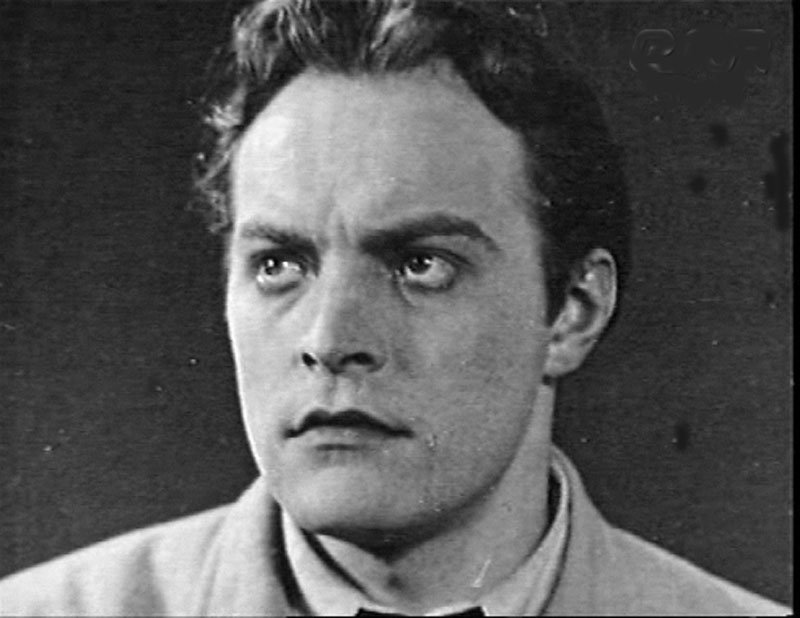
Rein Aren

Rein Aren (25 December 1927, in Tartu – 16 May 1990, in Tallinn) was an Estonian actor and ballet dancer known for his work in theatre, film, and television. He was active during the Soviet era and made significant contributions to Estonian performing arts across several decades.

== Career ==
Aren graduated from the Estonian studio of GITIS in 1951. From 1946 to 1949, he worked as a choir singer and ballet dancer at the Vanemuine theatre in Tartu. Aren worked at the Estonian Drama Theatre from 1951 to 1972, and again from 1979. Additionally, from 1973 until 1979, he worked at the Russian Theatre. Besides theatre roles, he appeared in several films. His younger brother was the ballet dancer and actor Väino Aren.

== Awards ==
- 1966: Honoured Artist of the Estonian SSR
- 1982: People's Artist of the Estonian SSR

== Filmography ==
- 1955: Jahid merel
- 1961: Ohtlikud kurvid
- 1969: Punane telk
- 1980: Pulmapilt
- 1982: Corrida
- 1984: Karoliine hõbelõng
- 1984: Hundiseaduse aegu
- 1989: Regina
