= Jüri Krjukov =

Estonian actor (1954–1997)

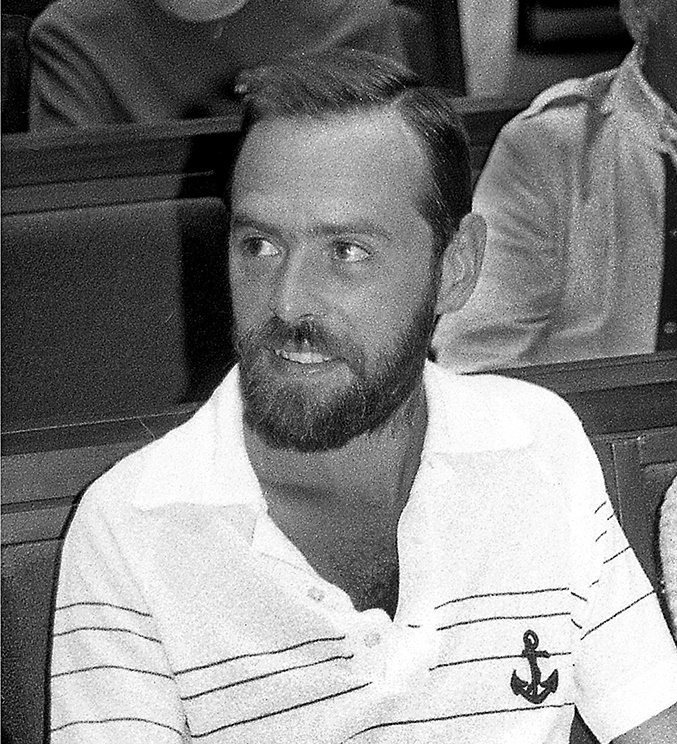
- Krjukov in 1988
- Born: 5 September 1954; Tallinn, then part of Estonian SSR, Soviet Union
- Died: 18 October 1997 (aged 43); Tallinn, Estonia
- Occupation: Actor
- Years active: 1968–1996
- Spouses: Urve Krjukov; Inge Krjukov; Ülle Toming
- Children: 1

Jüri Krjukov (5 September 1954 – 18 October 1997) was an Estonian actor.

== Early life and education ==
Jüri Krjukov was born in Tallinn to Igor Krjukov, an engineer of Russian origin, and Maria Krjukov (née Pirson), who was Estonian. He had an older brother Oleg, seven years his senior. When he was six-months-old, his father died and his mother supported the family by working as a hairdresser.

In 1968, aged fourteen, Krjukov made his film debut in a starring role as Ilmar, an Estonian boy in the Pioneer organization, in the Aleksandr Kurochkin directed Russian language children's film Passenger from the "Equator". After filming, he returned to his studies at the Tallinn Secondary School No. 7 (now, Tallinn English College), graduating in 1972.

Afterwards, he enrolled at the Tallinn Conservatory to study acting under instructor Voldemar Panso, graduating in 1976. His is graduating classmates included: Merle Karusoo, Ago-Endrik Kerge, Urmas Kibuspuu, Kalju Orro, Anne Paluver, Külliki Tool, Lembit Peterson, Priit Pedajas, Eero Spriit, and Peeter Volkonski. His diploma production roles were as Kägu in August Kitzberg's Kosjasõit and Director in Luigi Pirandello's Six Characters in Search of an Author.

== Career ==
=== Stage ===
In 1976, following his graduation from the Tallinn State Conservatory, Krjukov began an engagement as an actor at the Estonian Drama Theatre in Tallinn that lasted until his death in 1997. Notable roles at the Estonian Drama include those in works by: Alexander Vampilov, Konstantin Trenyov, William Shakespeare, J. M. Barrie, Neil Simon, Paul Abraham, Valentin Rasputin, Jaan Kross, Alan Ayckbourn, Harold Pinter, Rein Saluri, Jean Genet, Georg Büchner, David Wood, Anton Chekhov, Robert Walser, Madis Kõiv, Tankred Dorst, Lars Norén, Eugene O'Neill, Manuel Puig, Mart Raud, Peter Shaffer, Mikhail Lermontov, Arthur Miller, Pierre Corneille, and Henrik Ibsen.

=== Film ===
In 1974, aged twenty, and while still a student at the Tallinn Conservatory, Krjukov made his first film as an adult in a small role in the Virve Aruoja and Jaan Tooming directed feature film Värvilised unenäod for Tallinnfilm. This was followed in 1978 by another small role in the Arvo Kruusement directed Tallinnfilm drama Naine kütab sauna, starring Ita Ever and Heino Mandri and based on the 1955 Villem Gross penned novel Talvepuhkus.

Krjukov garnered more prominent film roles in the 1980s; the first (albeit still somewhat small role) of the decade being in the 1983 Valentin Kuik directed Tallinnfilm biopic Lurich, based on the life of Estonian wrestler and strongman Georg Lurich. Other film appearances of the decade included a small role in the 1984 Helle Murdmaa directed fantasy film Karoliine hõbelõng, as Hans Metten in the 1984 Olav Neuland directed period adventure film Hundiseaduse aegu, and a starring role as Estonian communist politician Viktor Kingissepp in the Kaljo Kiisk directed 1986 historical drama Saja aasta pärast mais. Krjukov had previously portrayed Viktor Kingissepp in the 1981 two-part television drama film Kaks päeva Viktor Kingissepa elust, directed by Tõnis Kask and airing on Eesti Televisioon.

Notable film roles of the 1990s included that of Timur in the Peeter Simm directed crime-comedy Ameerika mäed (1994) and as a Bolshevik in the 1997 Hardi Volmer comedy Minu Leninid (1997).

Krjukov also had a lengthy career in film as a voice actor, appearing roles in a number of animated films. Some notable animated film roles include Naksitrallid II (1987), Eine murul (1987), Linn (1988), Naksitrallid (1990), Setu vurle küüsis (1993), Kapsapea (1993), Tom ja Fluffy (1997) and Kapsapea 2 ehk Tagasi Euroopasse (1997).

=== Television ===
Jüri Krjukov's television career was varied. He appeared in television series, television films, television plays and literary programs. He made his television debut as an actor in a small role in the Eesti Televisioon (ETV) crime series Kolm rubiini in 1978. His first significant television role was that of Ludvig Sander in the comedy television film Pisuhänd in 1981, based on the 1913 satirical play written by Eduard Vilde and directed by Tallinn Conservatory classmate Ago-Endrik Kerge.

In 1982, he followed with the role of Esko Trahter in the television drama film Musta katuse all, again directed by Kerge and based on the 1959 novel Lea by Juhan Smuul. The same year, he appeared in a starring role as Salomon Vesipruul in the popular television film Kuulsuse Narrid, based on an 1892 satirical story of the same name by Eduard Bornhöhe.

The following year, he was once more directed by Kerge for the role of Arnold Pete in the television film Enn Vetemaa kinovariatsioonid teemal "Püha Susanna ehk meistrite kool", an adaptation of the 1974 Enn Vetemaa penned play Püha Susanna ehk Meistrite kool. In 1985, he was chosen by Kerge to appear as Mustafa in the television film Savoy ball, an adaptation of Paul Abraham's 1932 operetta Ball im Savoy. Krjukov had previously played the role onstage at the Estonian Drama Theatre in 1982. The same year, he was again directed by Kerge in the role of Ivo in Kahe kodu ballaad, a two-part television film adaptation of Kalju Saaber's 1980 story of the same name.

In the 1990s, Krjukov began appearing in several roles on television series. From 1993 until 1995, he appeared on the ETV television drama series Salmonides. In 1995, he appeared as Mr. Sirkel in the twelve-part ETV historical drama series Wikmani poisid, based on the 1988 novel of the same name by Jaan Kross. In 1995, he began appearing as Milord on the TV3 comedy series M Klubi, which moved to ETV after the first series and ran until 1998.

From 1980 until 1985, Krjukov also appeared frequently as an actor and narrator on the ETV literary program Suuri meistreid.

=== Radio ===
From the late 1970s, Krjukov also appeared in several radio plays, most notably Ma armastasin sakslast and Reekviem nunnale, both in 1979.

== Personal life and death ==
Krjukov was married three times. His first wife was Urve Krjukov. The marriage ended in divorce. His second marriage to Inge Krjukov, with whom he had a son, Aleksander, born in 1982, also ended in divorce. His third marriage was to dancer and actress Ülle Toming.

In August 1996, Krjukov discovered a small bump under his tongue, which was initially diagnosed as stomatitis. For two weeks, he applied the topical antibacterial Iodinol to the area, but the lump didn't resolve itself. A more thorough follow-up with physicians revealed the lump to be pre-cancerous and he was scheduled to have the lump excised in October. During the operation, cancer was detected. Krjukov underwent radiation therapy and continued to film scenes for the television series M Klubi and take minor roles with little dialogue or non-speaking roles in theatre. During his treatment, he didn't stop smoking, however

For the last two months of his life, Krjukov was unable to speak and had to communicate with his wife Ülle by writing. Krjukov died in Tallinn on 18 October 1997, aged 43, and was buried at Tallinn's Forest Cemetery.

In 2004, theatre critic Pille-Riin Purje penned a biography of Jüri Krjukov titled Jüri Krjukov: rolliportreed ja mälestuskillud (Jüri Krjukov: Role Portraits and Memories), published by Eesti Teatriliit.

== Awards ==
- Meritorious Artist of the Estonian SSR (1984)
- Ants Lauter Prize (1985)
- Best Actor of the Year (1991 and 1993)

== Selected filmography ==
- Naine kütab sauna (1978)
- Kaks päeva Viktor Kingissepa elust (1980)
- Pisuhänd (1982)
- Viimne visiit (1983, Latvia)
- Kahe kodu ballaad (1985)
- Minu Leninid (1997)
