= Kalju Orro =

Estonian actor (born 1952)

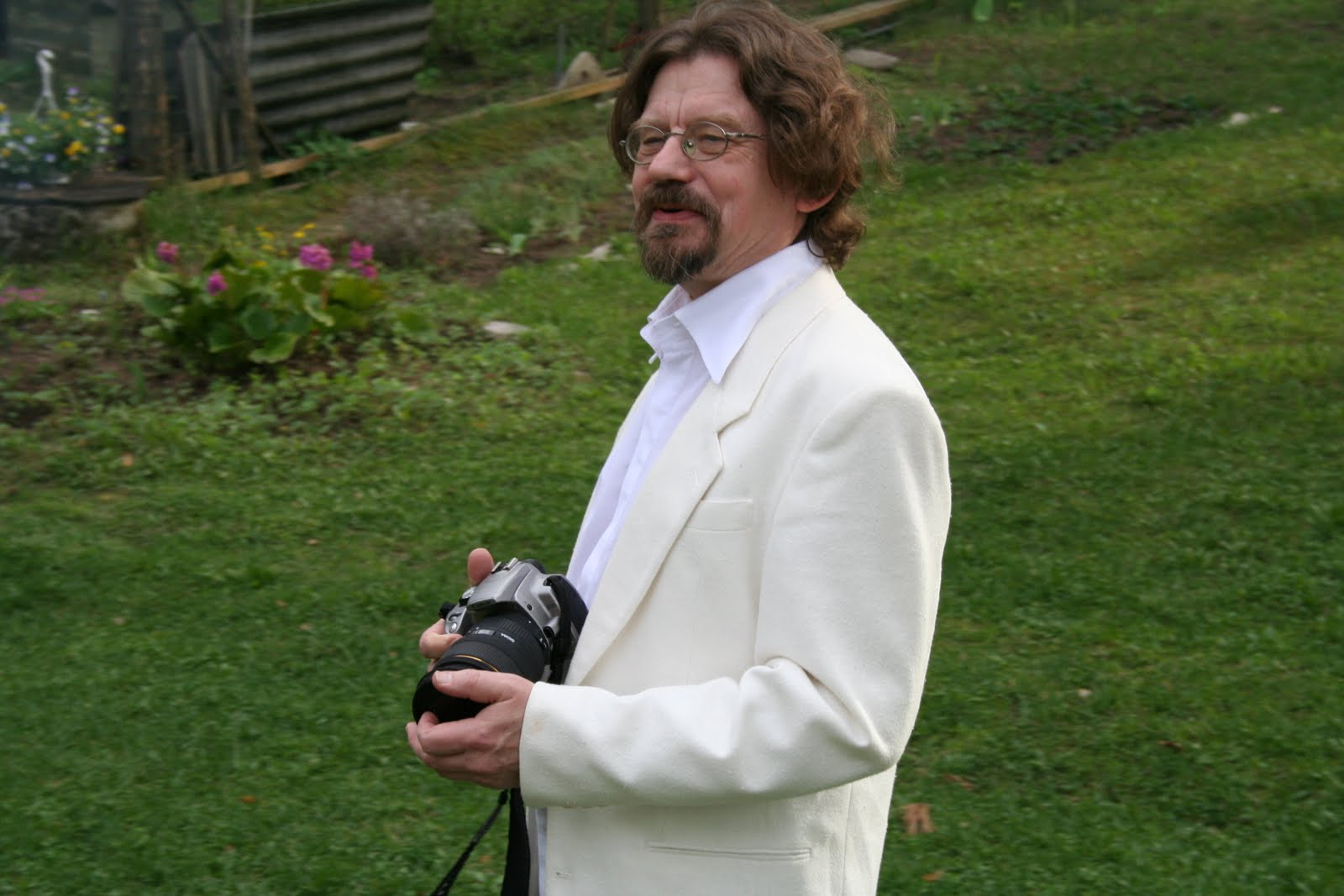
- Orro in 2010
- Born: 27 March 1952 (age 74); Tartu, then part of Estonian SSR, Soviet Union
- Occupations: Actor, lecturer, drama instructor, theatre producer
- Years active: 1971–present
- Spouse: Reet Neimar (died 2008)
- Children: 1

Kalju Orro (born 27 March 1952) is an Estonian stage, film and television actor, acting instructor, lecturer, theatre producer, and pedagogue.

== Early life and education ==
Kalju Orro was born in Tartu, where he attended primary and secondary schools. He is a 1970 graduate of Tartu 17 Vocational School. Afterward, he enrolled in the Vanemuine Drama Studios in Tartu, graduating in 1971. In 1972, he enrolled in the Performing Arts Department of Tallinn State Conservatory (now, the Estonian Academy of Music and Theatre) under instruction of actor and theatre pedagogue Voldemar Panso, graduating in 1976. Among his graduating classmates were Merle Karusoo, Ago-Endrik Kerge, Urmas Kibuspuu, Lembit Peterson, Aare Laanemets, Jüri Krjukov, Anne Paluver, Külliki Tool, Priit Pedajas, Eero Spriit, and Peeter Volkonski.

== Career ==
=== Stage ===
From 1976 until 1978, he was engaged at the Viktor Kingissepp Tallinn State Academic Drama Theatre (now, the Estonian Drama Theatre) in Tallinn, before departing to the Estonian SSR State Youth Theatre (since 1992, the Tallinn City Theatre), where he has been engaged as an actor and producer since 1978. Among his more memorable international roles during his long career at the Tallinn City Theatre include those in works by such authors and playwrights as: Lyudmila Petrushevskaya, Dale Wasserman, Celestino Gorostiza, Aleksis Kivi, David Pownall, Luchino Visconti, Anton Chekhov, Dario Fo, Terry Johnson, Brecht and Weill, William Shakespeare, Mark Twain, Alexandre Dumas, Thomas Mann, David Storey, Evelyn Waugh, Luigi Pirandello, Peter Barnes, David Hair, Tom Stoppard, Marina Carr, William Boyd, Nikolai Gogol, Dorota Masłowska, and Maxim Gorky. Notable roles in works by Estonian authors and playwrights include those of: A. H. Tammsaare, Hugo Raudsepp, Jaanus Rohumaa, Jaan Tätte, Madis Kõiv, and Paavo Piik. Orro has also worked as a theatrical producer on a number of stage productions during his career with the Tallinn City Theatre, beginning with a 1981 production of Ödön von Horváth's 1938 novel Youth Without God.

=== Film, television, and radio ===
Kalju Orro's first prominent feature-film role was as Markar in the 1977 Peeter Simm, Toomas Tahvel, and Peeter Urbla-directed romantic drama Karikakramäng for Tallinnfilm. Other notable film roles include that of Volt in the 1992 Lembit Ulfsak-directed comedy family film Lammas all paremas nurgas, author August Kitzberg in the Rainer Sarnet-directed 2005 thriller Libahundi needus, and as Uugu in the Elmo Nüganen-directed 2006 comedy Meeletu, which was based on the play of the same name by Jaan Tätte. In 2017, he made a cameo appearance as a hospital patient in the Andres Puustusmaa-directed comedy Rohelised kassid.

Orro's first prominent role on Estonian television was as Kilian in the 1976 Elvi Koppel-directed family film Kuidas kuningas kuu peale kippus. Other notable television roles were as Karl in the 1984 Ago-Endrik Kerge-directed and Enn Vetemaa-penned Eesti Televisioon (ETV) comedy television film Püha Susanna ehk meistrite kool, Constable Tults in the 1995 ETV historical drama miniseries Wikmani poisid, Hardi Tiidus in the Jaak Kilmi-directed 2005 ETV comedy-fantasy television film Kohtumine tundmatuga, and as Hendrik Soopalu in the Kanal 2 crime series Kelgukoerad in 2012. In 2013, he joined the cast of the Kanal 2 comedy series Naabriplika as the character Insener. In 2017 he joined the cast of the ETV ten-part drama series Pank, which follows the rise and subsequent misfortunes of a new bank that which emerges in Estonia in the 1990s. In 2020, he appeared in the Peeter Simm directed coming-of-age period drama Vee peal.

Kalju Orro has also worked extensively as a voice actor and radio performer. In 1999, he was awarded the Estonian Radio Actor's Prize.

=== Educator ===
From 1976 until 1994, Kalju Orro worked as a lecturer and drama instructor at the Performing Arts Department of the Estonian Academy of Music and Theatre. From 1995 until 1999, he was a lecturer and instructor at Tallinn Pedagogical University (now, Tallinn University), and returning as a lecturer to the Estonian Academy of Music and Theatre in 1998.

=== Literature and photography ===
In addition to acting, Orro has written, compiled, and contributed to a number of published books on the history of Estonian theatre, including the two-volume Lavakooliraamat (2007 and 2010). Vana album, a collection of photographs taken by Orro of people and events associated with Estonian theatre, was published in 2002.

== Personal life ==
Kalju Orro was married to theatre scholar, editor, and critic Reet Neimar who died in 2008. Their son Oliver Orro, an architect, author, and professor, was born in 1982.

== Acknowledgements ==
- Estonian Radio Actor Prize (1999)
- Order of the White Star, IV Class (2005)
- Karl Ader Award (2007)
