= Külliki Saldre =

Estonian actress

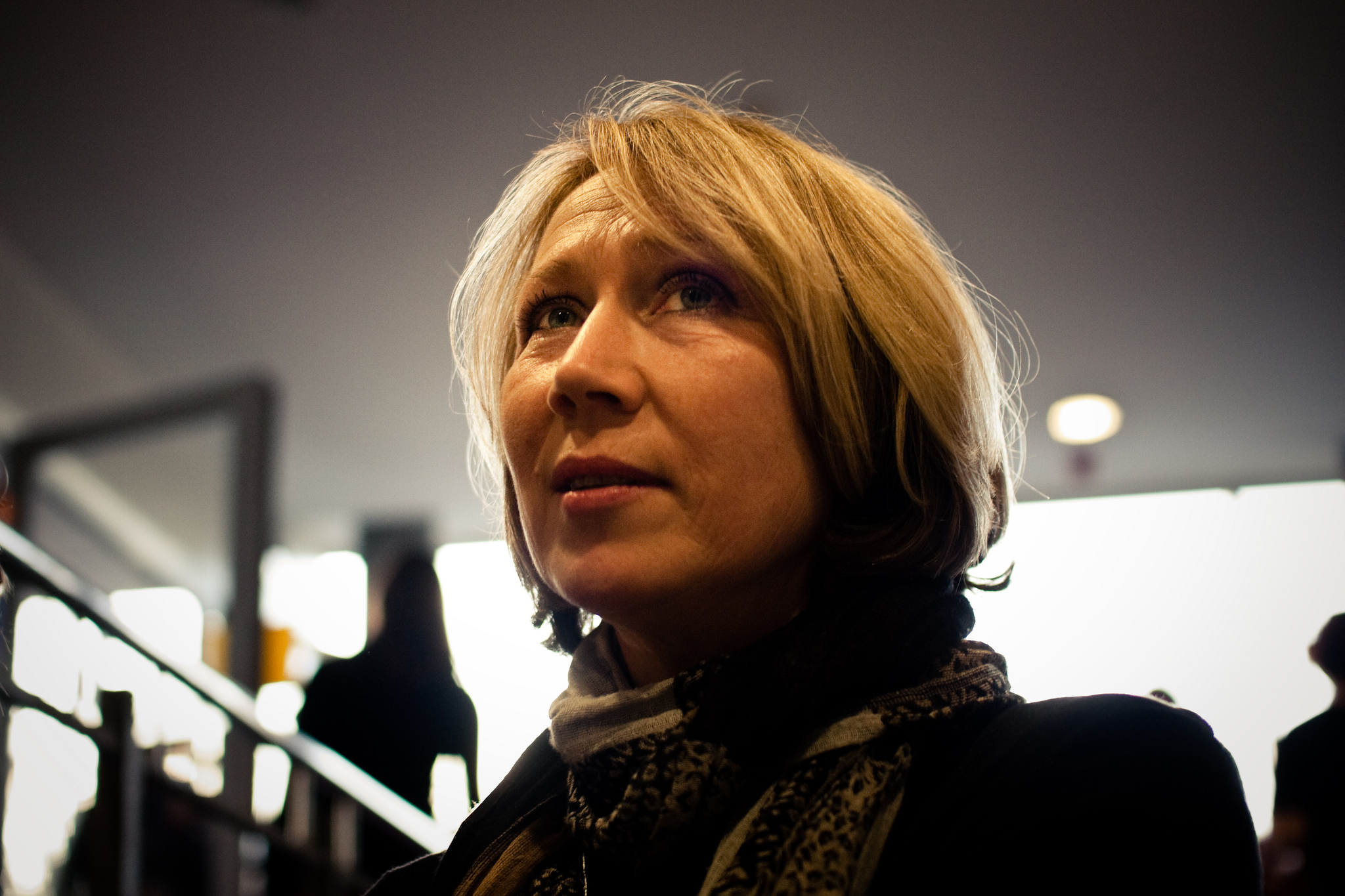
- Külliki Saldre in 2010
- Born: Külliki Tool; 29 December 1952 (age 73); Kehtna, then part of Estonian SSR, Soviet Union
- Other name: Külliki Tool-Saldre
- Occupation: Actress
- Years active: 1974-preset
- Spouse: Viljo Saldre
- Children: 2

Külliki Saldre (until 1986, Külliki Tool; born 29 December 1952) is an Estonian stage, television, radio and film actress.

== Early life and education ==
Külliki Saldre was born in the small town of Kehtna, in Rapla County in 1952, where she graduated from secondary school. Her older sister is performance artist Krista Tool and her younger brother is philosopher and translator Andrus Tool. Following graduation, she studied photography before beginning studies at the Tallinn State Conservatory, Performing Arts Department (now, the Estonian Academy of Music and Theatre), graduating in 1976. Among her graduating classmates were Merle Karusoo, Ago-Endrik Kerge, Urmas Kibuspuu, Aare Laanemets, Lembit Peterson, Jüri Krjukov, Anne Paluver, Kalju Orro, Priit Pedajas, Eero Spriit, and Peeter Volkonski.

== Stage career ==
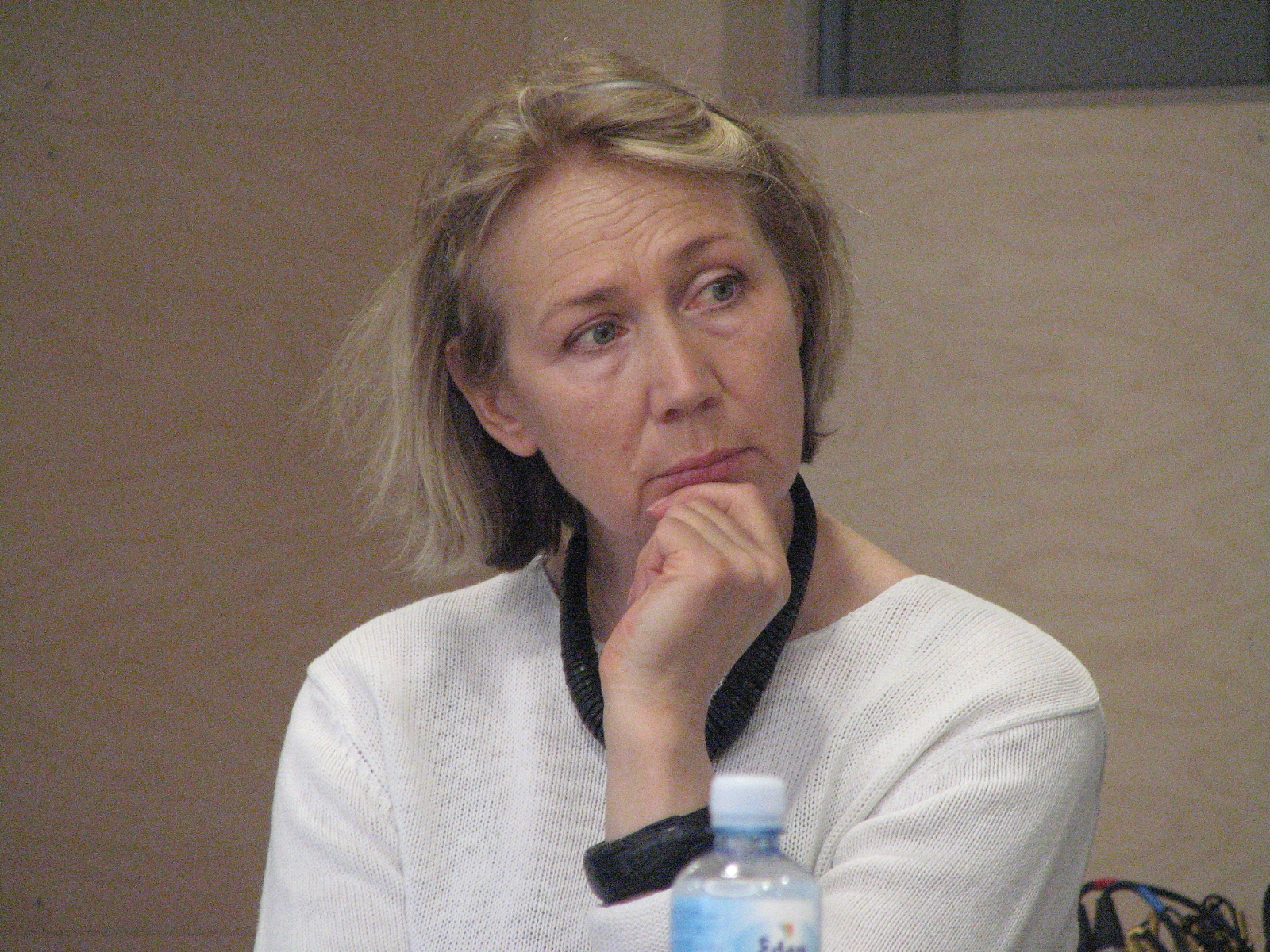
Saldre in 2011

Saldre began her stage career in 1976 after joining the Estonian Drama Theatre in Tallinn. She made her stage debut as a student in the role of Eeva Marland in a 1975 production of Eduard Vilde's Tabamata ime. Her stage debut as an actress formally engaged at the theatre was in a 1976 production of Luigi Pirandello's 1921 absurdist metatheatrical play Six Characters in Search of an Author. She would remain at the Estonian Drama Theatre until 1983. Among her most notable roles at the theatre include those in stage productions of works by Juhan Viiding, Maxim Gorky and Mats Traat.

After leaving the Estonian Drama Theatre, she became engaged at the Ugala theatre in Viljandi in 1984 and would remain with the theatre until 1995. Notable roles at the Ugala include those in stage productions of works by: Shakespeare (Cordelia in King Lear and Desdemona in Othello), Giles Cooper, Henrik Ibsen, Tennessee Williams, Anton Chekhov, and Alexandre Dumas.

Between 1995 and 1998, Saldre worked as a freelance actress. She joined the Vanemuine theatre in Tartu 1998, where she is still currently engaged. During her years at the Vanemuine, she performed in a large variety of stage productions by such international playwrights and authors as: Émile Zola, Thorbjørn Egner, Per Olov Enquist, Leo Tolstoy, Emily Brontë, Edward Albee, Brian Friel, Tom Stoppard, Sam Shepard, Rodgers and Hammerstein, Ivan Goncharov, Franz Kafka, and Donald Margulies. Among her more memorable performances at the Vanemuine in roles by Estonian playwrights and authors include those of: Uku Uusberg, Mati Unt, Eduard Vilde, Urmas Lennuk, and Andra Teede.

== Television career ==
Beginning in the late 1970s, Külliki Saldre performed in a number of stage productions that aired on Estonian television; among them are Kuidas kuningas kuu peale kippus in 1976 and Meie maja tsirkus in 1978. Both of which aired on Eesti Televisioon (ETV).

Apart from the stage, she has appeared in central roles in several television series. Among them include the role of the Chancellor of Justice in the ETV political satire program Riigimehed beginning in 2010 and as investigator Ülle in the Kanal 2 action-drama Mägede varjud beginning in 2013.

She has also appeared in ETV's comedy series Hakkab jälle pihta in 2013, and as Maria Keersalu in the 2015 TV3 crime drama series Keeris. In 2018, she joined the cast of the ETV series Miks Mitte?! in the role of Edna.

== Film career ==
Saldre would not make her film debut until accepting the role of a school principal in the 2012 Finnish-Estonian noir thriller Rat King. This was followed by the more substantial role of Anu in the 2013 Ilmar Raag directed romantic drama Kertu (English release title: Love is Blind), starring Ursula Ratasepp and Mait Malmsten for Amrion studios.

Other film roles include Irina in the 2014 drama Nullpunkt, as the head nurse in the 2015 Margus Paju directed family adventure film Supilinna Salaselts, and a role in the 2019 Tanel Toom directed historical drama Tõde ja õigus, which was an adaptation of the first volume of the 1926–1933 social epic pentalogy of the same name by Estonian author A. H. Tammsaare.

== Personal life ==
Külliki Saldre is married to actor and director Viljo Saldre; the couple have a son, Mattias and a daughter, Maarja.
