= Spriit =

Family name

Spriit is an Estonian surname. Notable people with the surname include:

- Edgar Spriit (1922–1993), Estonian journalist, satirist, editor and politician
- Eero Spriit (born 1949), Estonian actor, theatre producer and director, and film and television producer
