= Tillniidu Nature Reserve =

Protected area in Estonia

- Location within Estonia
- Location: Estonia
- Coordinates: 58°49′00″N 25°00′30″E
- Area: 38 ha (94 acres)
- Established: 2001 (2009)

Tillniidu Nature Reserve is a nature reserve which is located in Rapla County, Estonia.

The area of the nature reserve is 38 ha.

The protected area was founded in 2001 to protect primeval forest and threatened species (black stork) in Koogiste village (in former Kehtna Parish).
