= Eero Spriit =

Estonian actor (born 1949)

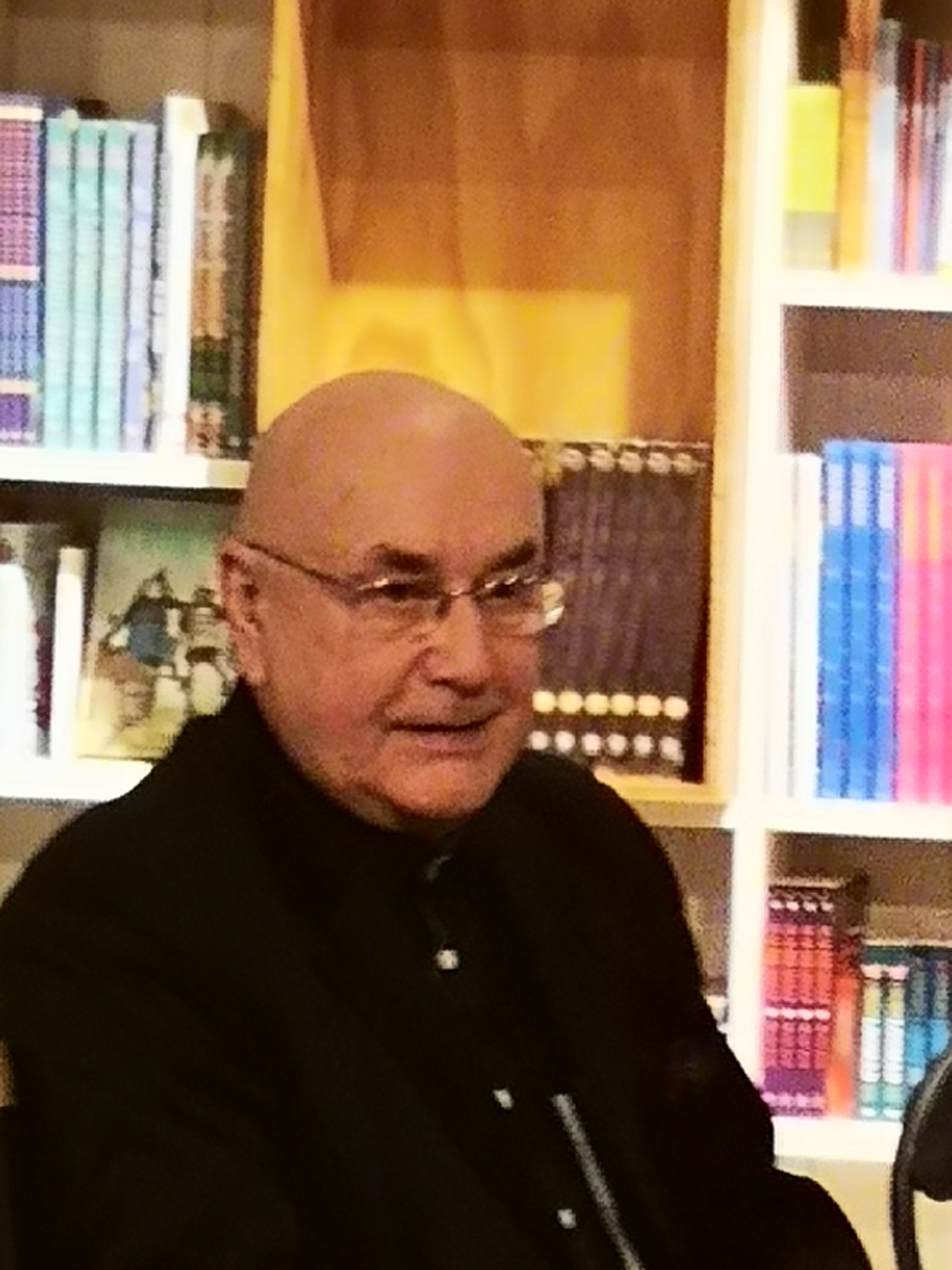
- Spriit in 2020
- Born: 4 September 1949 (age 76); Pärnu, then part of Estonian SSR, Soviet Union
- Occupations: Actor, film producer, theatre director
- Years active: 1971–present
- Children: 2
- Parent(s): Edgar Spriit; Ester Tartu

Eero Spriit (born 4 September 1949), is an Estonian actor, theatre producer and director, and film and television producer. Spriit's career as an actor began in the early 1970s.

== Early life and education ==
Eero Spriit was born as one of two children in Pärnu to journalist, satirist, and politician Edgar Spriit and journalist Ester Spriit (née Tartu). His parents divorced when he was young and his father married dancer and dance pedagogue Elonna Goretski. From this union, he has a half-brother, Egon Spriit. In 1972, he enrolled in the Performing Arts Department of the Tallinn State Conservatory (now, the Estonian Academy of Music and Theatre) in Tallinn to study acting under course supervisor Voldemar Panso, graduating in 1976. Among his graduating classmates were Merle Karusoo, Ago-Endrik Kerge, Aare Laanemets, Kalju Orro, Jüri Krjukov, Anne Paluver, Priit Pedajas, Lembit Peterson, Külliki Tool, Urmas Kibuspuu, and Peeter Volkonski.

== Career ==
=== Acting ===
Eero Spriit's career as an actor began in early 1971 at age twenty-one, when he was cast in the role of Don Spoletti in the Arvo Kruusement-directed musical-comedy feature film Don Juan Tallinnas for Tallinnfilm, released in 1972. The following year, he enrolled at Tallinn State Conservatory, and upon graduating he began an engagement as an actor at the Estonian State Youth Theatre (now, the Tallinn City Theatre) from 1976 until 1992. Among his more memorable roles as an actor at the Estonian State Youth Theatre were in works by: Efim Chepovetskiy, Friedebert Tuglas, Aleksey Tolstoy, Tennessee Williams, Giovanni Boccaccio, Grigori Gorin, Jean Sarment, Stanislav Stratiev, Friedrich Dürrenmatt, Andrus Kivirähk, August von Kotzebue, Lewis Carroll, Johann Wolfgang von Goethe, the Brothers Grimm, Marc Camoletti, Garson Kanin, Vladimir Tarasov, and Eduardo De Filippo. Many of the productions in which Spriit was featured were broadcast on Eesti Televisioon (ETV) as television plays. In 1992, Spriit became a producer and head director of the theatre; a position he held until 1998, while continuing to act in the interim.

In 2009, Spriit began appearing as an actor in productions at Old Baskin's Theatre in Tallinn, where still performs.

In addition to theatre, Spriit has had a prolific career as a television and film actor. In 1976, he played the role of Uncle in the Elvi Koppel-directed family-musical television film Kuidas kuningas kuu peale kippus. The following year, appeared in the Kaljo Kiisk-directed historical drama Surma hinda küsi surnutelt, followed by several roles in the 1978 Irene Lään-directed musical-melodrama television film Imelugu, based on the opera of the same name by composer Raimo Kangro. Notable film roles include that of an executioner in 1991 Tõnu Virve-directed historic epic Surmatants, Lenin VI/Monk in the Hardi Volmer-directed historical comedy Minu Leninid, Olev in the 2013 Andres Maimik and Katrin Maimik-directed romantic drama Karikakramäng II: Hõbepulm, Director in the Mihkel Ulk-directed drama Nullpunkt, and Doctor in the 2018 Maria Avdjuško-directed drama Tuliliilia.

Among Spriit's more prominent appearances on television include the role of Estonian military general and statesman Johan Laidoner in the 2009 Ain Prosa-directed historical twelve-part mini-series Tuulepealne maa, which chronicles the history of Estonia through the early 20th-century of Estonia; the Estonian War of Independence, independence, and the inter-war period to World War II. In 2010, he played the role of Helmut on the ETV series ENSV, which humorously reflects on life during the 1980s in the Estonian Soviet Socialist Republic. Between 2011 and 2016, he made several appearances on the TV3 comedy-crime series Kättemaksukontor.

To many Estonian television viewers, Spriit is possibly best recalled as the character Thor-Björn Margna on the popular, long-running ETV drama series Õnne 13. Spriit joined the cast at the series' inception in 1993 and has remained a cast member ever since.

=== Producer and director ===
In 1999, Spriit began working as the head producer of entertainment at Eesti Televisioon (ETV). He worked at ETV as a producer and programming director until 2007. In 2008, Spriit was hired as the Deputy Head of the Editorial Board of Productions at Eesti Rahvusringhääling (ERR), the publicly funded radio and television organisation. Since 2009, he has been a Board Advisor with the company. Since 2016, Spriit has worked as a documentary film producer and production coordinator with ERR. He has produced approximately twelve documentary films focusing on global issues such as poverty, education, political corruption, and war and its aftermath in such places as Sri Lanka, Rwanda, Ukraine, Palestine, Ethiopia, Cambodia, and Georgia.

Spriit has been a member of the Estonian Producers' Union since 1993, and from 1995 until 1997 was the association's chairman.

== Personal life ==
Eero Spriit has been married and divorced twice. He has two adult children and currently lives in Tallinn.
