= Kastna =

Kastna may refer to several places in Estonia:

- Kastna, Pärnu County, village in Tõstamaa Parish, Pärnu County
- Kastna, Rapla County, village in Kehtna Parish, Rapla County
