= Nadalama =

Nadalama may refer to several places in Estonia:

- Nadalama, Lääne-Viru County, village in Estonia
- Nadalama, Rapla County, village in Estonia
