= Ellamaa, Rapla County =

Village in Estonia

Ellamaa
- Village
- Location within Estonia
- Coordinates: 58°41′42″N 24°56′05″E
- Country: Estonia
- County: Rapla County
- Parish: Kehtna Parish
- Time zone: UTC+2 (EET)
  - Summer (DST): UTC+3 (EEST)

Ellamaa is a village in Kehtna Parish, Rapla County in northern-central Estonia.
