= Ott Reinumäe =

Estonian footballer

Ott Reinumäe (born 20 April 1984) is an Estonian footballer who played as a midfielder.

He was born in Kohila. In 2003 he graduated from Audentes Sports Gymnasium.

He began his football career in 1995 in FC Flora's Kehtna Football School. He has played for FC Valga and FC Lelle. In 2003–2004 he was a member of Estonia men's national football team.
