= Kaerepere (village) =

Village in Estonia

Coordinates: 58°57′34″N 24°51′25″E

- Village
- Interactive map of Kaerepere
- Country: Estonia
- County: Rapla County
- Parish: Kehtna Parish
- Time zone: UTC+2 (EET)
  - Summer (DST): UTC+3 (EEST)

Kaerepere is a village in Kehtna Parish, Rapla County in north-central Estonia.
