= Kehtna-Nurme =

Village in Estonia

Coordinates: 58°55′00″N 24°54′49″E

- Village
- Interactive map of Kehtna-Nurme
- Country: Estonia
- County: Rapla County
- Parish: Kehtna Parish
- Time zone: UTC+2 (EET)
  - Summer (DST): UTC+3 (EEST)

Kehtna-Nurme is a village in Kehtna Parish, Rapla County in northern-central Estonia.
