= Lelle (disambiguation) =

Lelle may refer to:

- Lelle, settlement in Estonia
- Balatonlelle, settlement in Hungary
- FC Lelle, amateur football club in Lelle, Estonia.
- Erhard Lelle (born 1946), German politician
- Frank Lelle (born 1965), German football player
- Tobias Lelle (born 1955), German voice actor
