= Kehtna =

Borough in Estonia

- Small borough
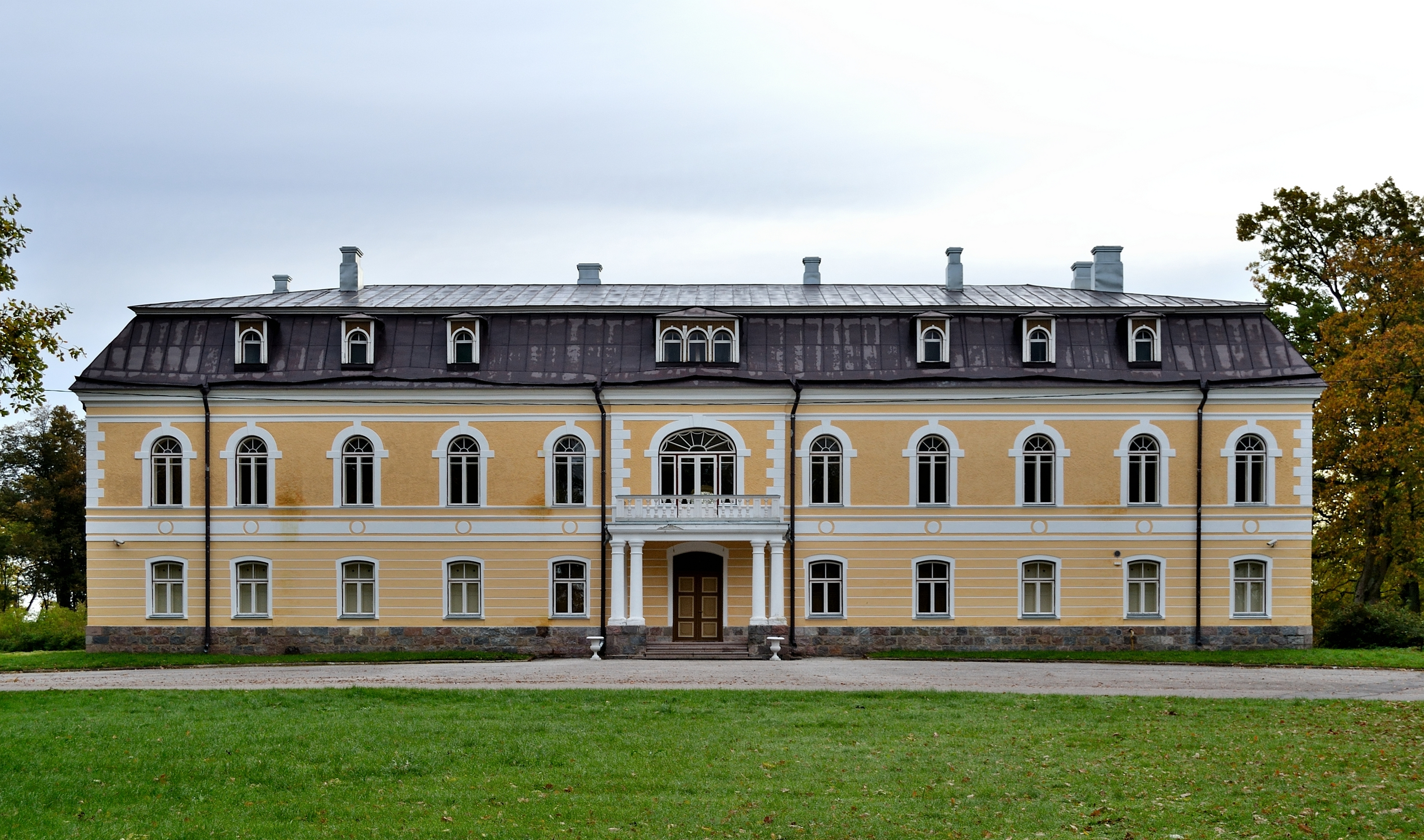
- Main building of Kehtna Manor

- Location in Estonia
- Coordinates: 58°55′26″N 24°52′32″E
- Country: Estonia
- County: Rapla County
- Municipality: Kehtna Parish
- First mentioned: 1470

Population (01.01.2012)
  - Total: 1,674

Kehtna (German: Kechtel) is a small borough (Estonian: alevik) in Rapla County, in central Estonia, located about 9 km (6 mi) southeast of the town of Rapla. Other nearby settlements include Keava, Kaerepere and Lelle. Kehtna is the administrative centre of Kehtna Parish. It has a population of 1,674 (as of 1 January 2012).

Kehtna Manor was first mentioned in 1470 as Kectel and in 1485 as Hof Kechtenal. The Early-Classicist main building was built in the 1790s. After a fire in 1905, it was rebuilt in 1906–10 and gained its current Baroque look. The manor is surrounded by a 5-hectare (12-acre) large park with a varied collection of shrubs.

== Notable people ==
- Alo Bärengrub (born 1984), football player
- Alo Dupikov (born 1985), football player
- Rummu Jüri (1856–?), outlaw and folk hero, worked as a valet in Kehtna Manor
- Külliki Saldre (born 1952), actress

== Gallery ==
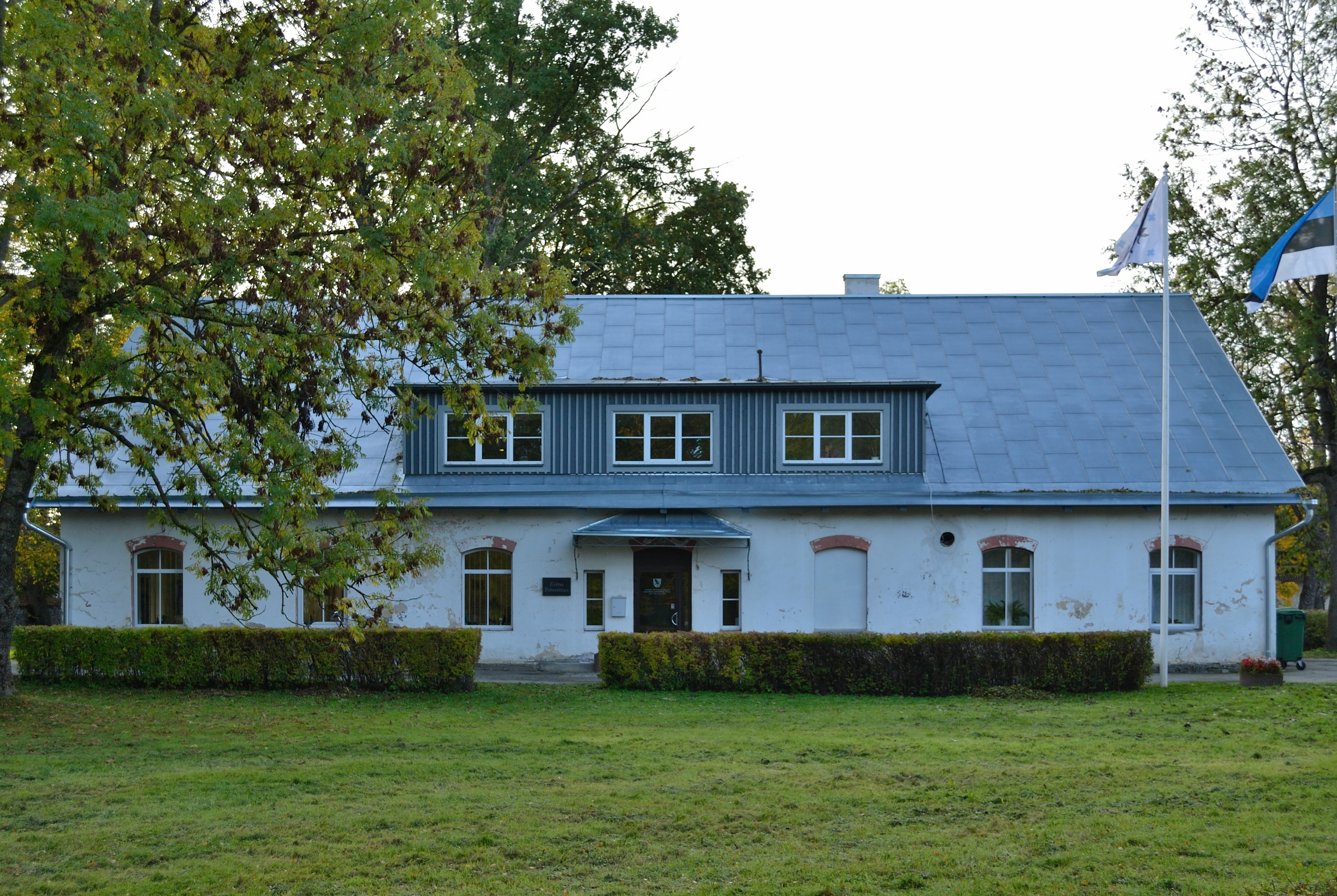
The local government of Kehtna Parish, the former Steward's house of Kehtna Manor

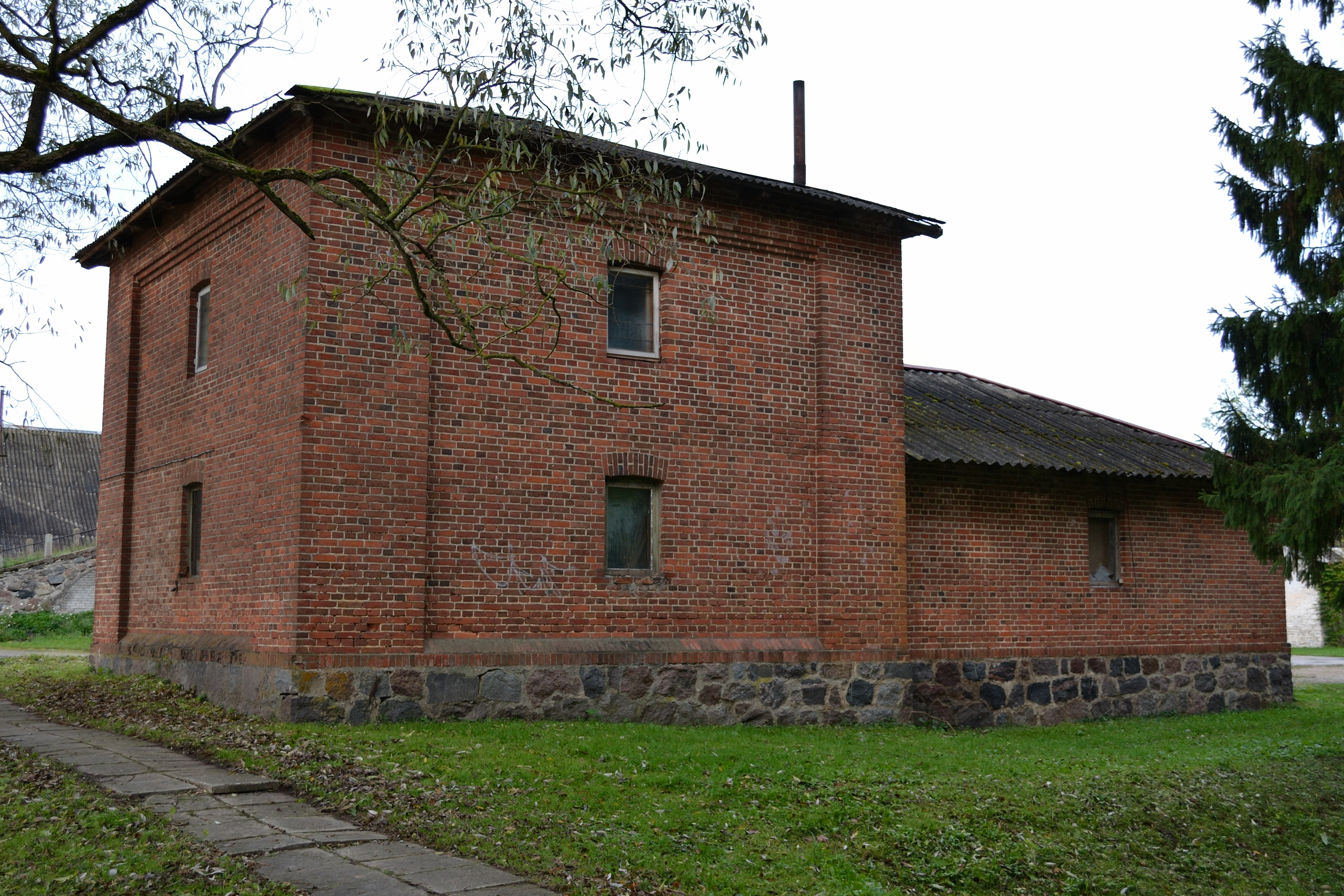
The vodka cellar of Kehtna Manor

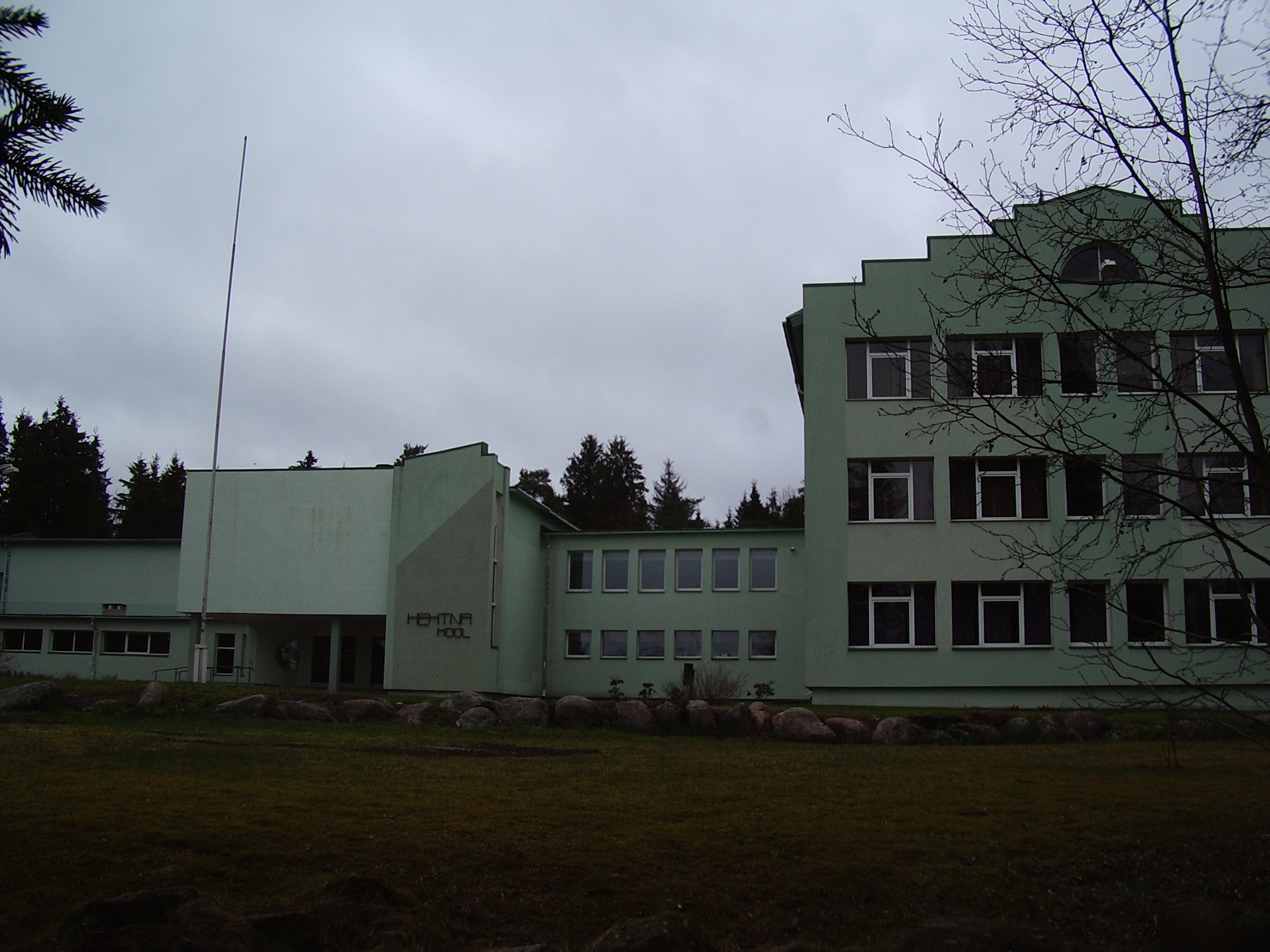
Kehtna Primary School

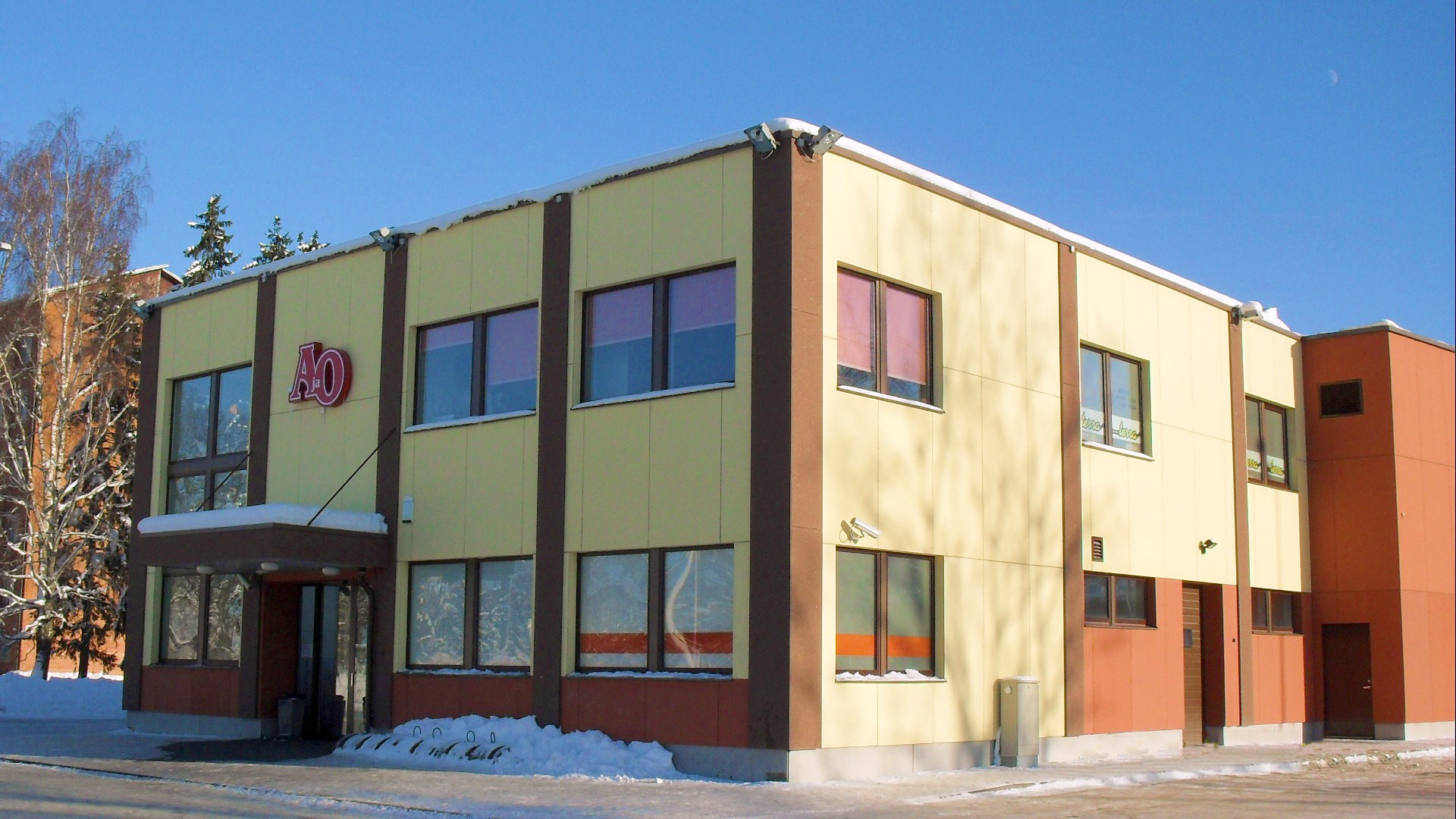
Local grocery store
