= Ohekatku =

Village in Estonia

Coordinates: 58°54′N 24°56′E

- Village
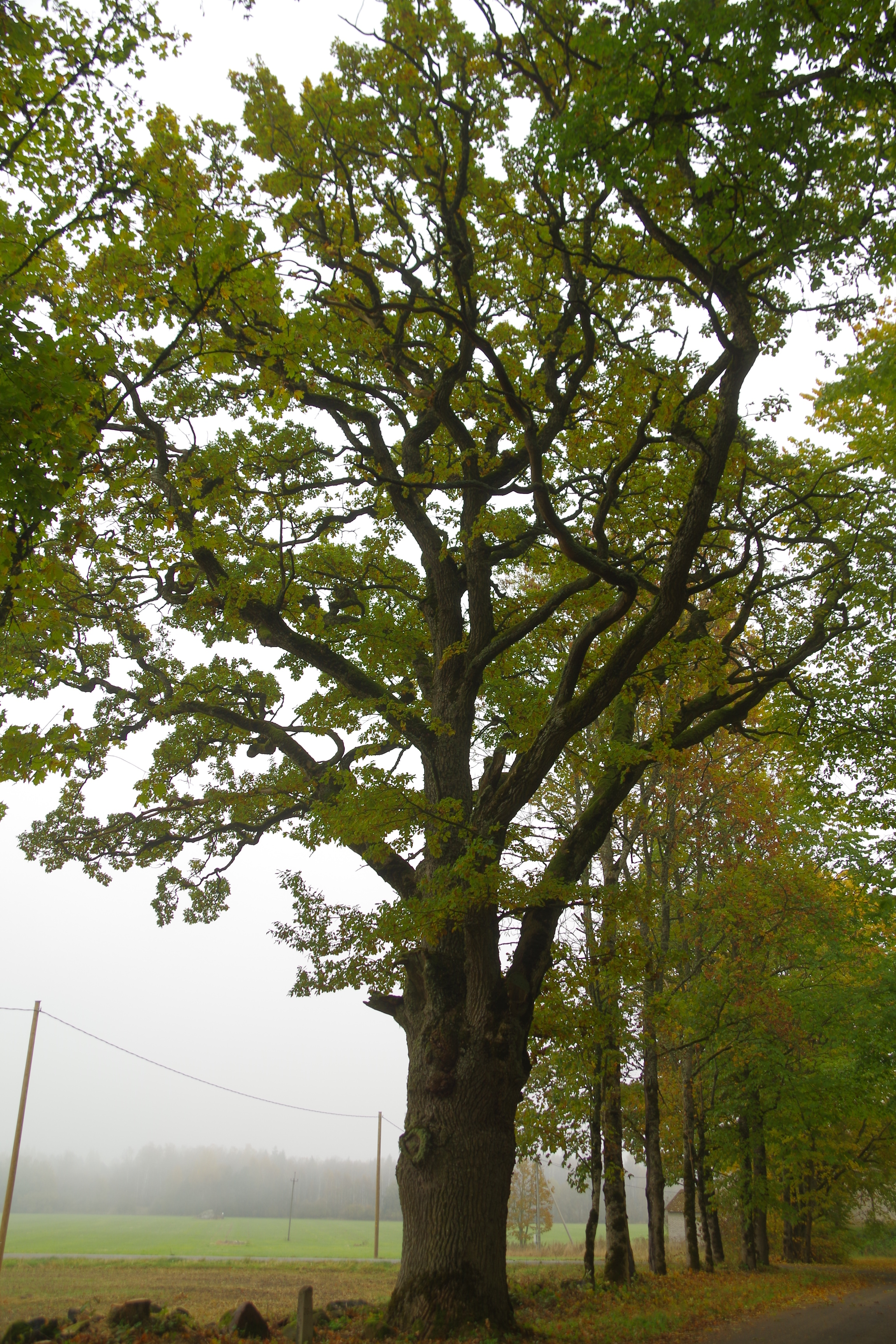
- Interactive map of Ohekatku
- Country: Estonia
- County: Rapla County
- Parish: Kehtna Parish
- Time zone: UTC+2 (EET)
  - Summer (DST): UTC+3 (EEST)

Ohekatku (German: Odenkat) is a village in Kehtna Parish, Rapla County in northern-central Estonia.
