= I Am 13 =

1980 play by Merle Karusoo

I Am 13 Years Old (Estonian: Olen kolmeteistkümne aastane, Olen 13-aastane)
- Original language: Estonian
- Written by: Merle Karusoo
- Characters: Andrus; Guido; Toomas
- Setting: Soviet-occupied Estonia

Premiere
- Date: 1980-07-26
- Place: Noorsooteater, Tallinn

I Am 13 Years Old (Estonian: Olen kolmeteistkümne aastane, Olen 13-aastane) is a 1980 play by Merle Karusoo. This is the first of a series of plays representing Karusoo's 'memory theatre' based on documentary material.

The drama, set in the Soviet occupation era of Estonia, was developed by integrating a number of essays collected from 13-year-old schoolchildren of the time, and developed into a coherent yet comprehensive plot depicting the everyday life and culture of early teenagers in the late 1970s.

It was staged by Karusoo 1980 in the State Youth Theatre of the Estonian SSR. The text was born in course of repetitions. It was played at Klooga rand, a beach outside of Tallinn.

== Foreshadowing ==
The generation depicted — people born in late 1960s — were the last generation spending their youth in occupied Estonia, and the first generation to shape the post-occupation culture, life and eventually, policy. While most of the superficial trappings have been forgotten, changed or become memorables, several attitudes illustrated in the play are recognisable in Estonian public life of late 20th and early 21st century.

== Common presentation ==
The play is best known as presented by Andrus Vaarik, Guido Kangur and Toomas Lõhmuste in the primary roles, and originally written with these actors in mind. (The primary roles, Andrus, Guido and Toomas, are named after them.) However, as a technically simple drama of strong recognition by teenagers of later decades, it, or episodes from it, has been presented by numerous non-notable school theatre projects.

== Awards ==
As the director, Merle Karusoo was awarded by the award of the Theatre Union of the Estonian SSR (1980). The troupe got the collective special award of the Theatre Union.

In 1981, Merle Karusoo was awarded by the Literary Award of the Estonian SSR for the play.

In 1988, Andrus Vaarik was awarded by the Ants Lauter Award for his roles, including the role in this play.

== Sources ==
- Olen 13-aastane
