= Põllu =

Village in Estonia

- Village
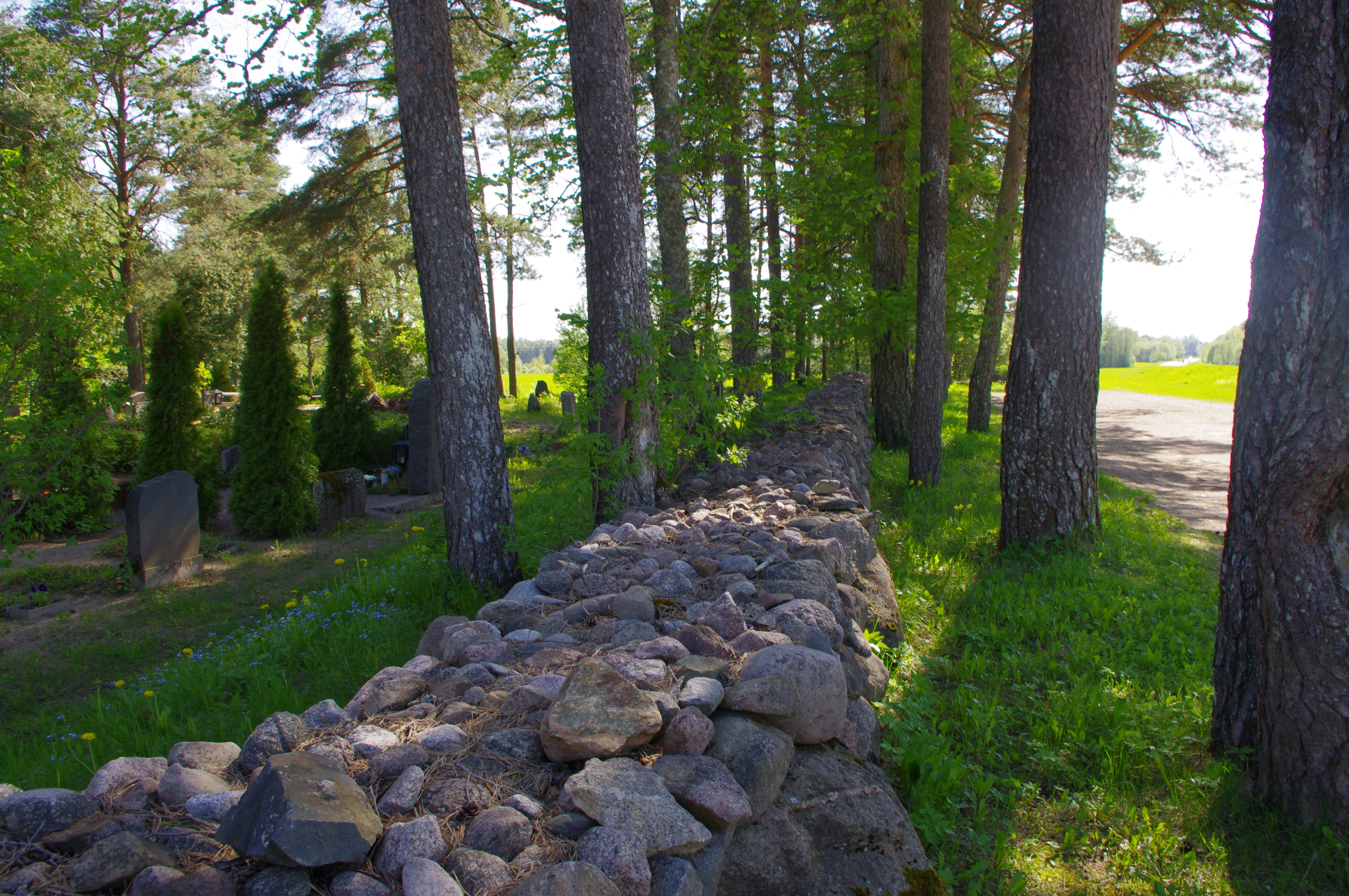
- Wall of Lelle cemetery.

- Location in Estonia
- Coordinates: 58°50′15″N 24°57′46″E
- Country: Estonia
- County: Rapla County
- Municipality: Kehtna Parish

Population (2011 Census)
  - Total: 44

Põllu (German: Feldhof) is a village in Kehtna Parish, Rapla County, in central Estonia. As of the 2011 census, the settlement's population was 44.

Lelle cemetery is located in Põllu village.
