= Johan Meimer =

Estonian athlete

Personal information
- Nationality: Estonian
- Born: 19 June 1904 Kehtna, Governorate of Estonia
- Died: 10 December 1944 (aged 40) Piirsalu, then part of Estonian SSR, Soviet Union

Sport
- Sport: Athletics
- Events: Javelin throw Decathlon

Johan Meimer (19 June 1904 – 10 December 1944) was an Estonian athlete. He competed in the men's javelin throw and the men's decathlon at the 1928 Summer Olympics. He was a forest brother and killed during the World War II by Soviets.
