= Koogiste =

Village in Estonia

Coordinates: 58°47′N 25°02′E

- Village
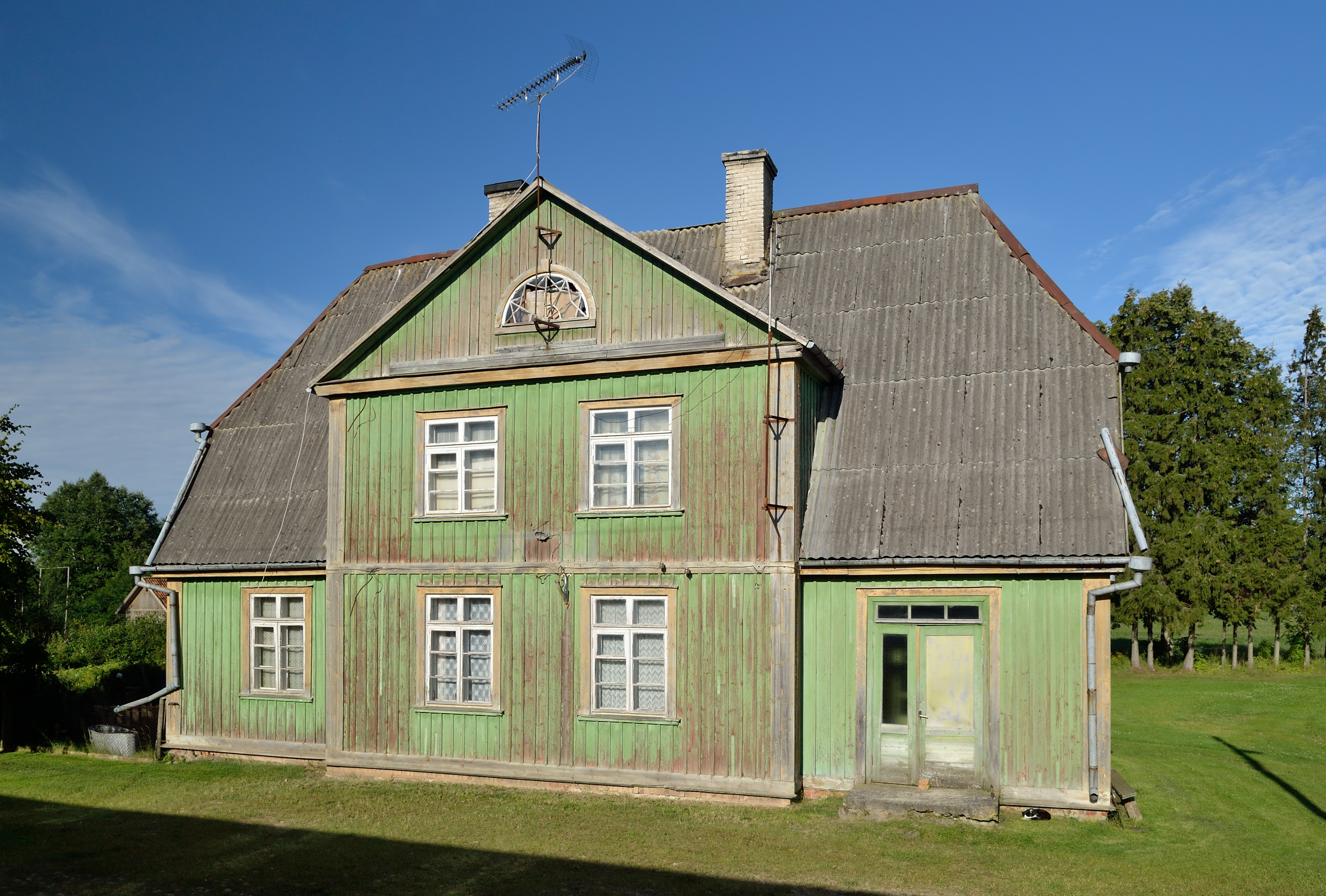
- Former Koogiste station building
- Interactive map of Koogiste
- Country: Estonia
- County: Rapla County
- Parish: Kehtna Parish
- Time zone: UTC+2 (EET)
  - Summer (DST): UTC+3 (EEST)

Koogiste is a village in Kehtna Parish, Rapla County in northern-central Estonia. It had a station on the Tallinn - Pärnu railway line operated by Elron, which closed in December 2018.
