= Ülle Ulla =

Estonian ballet dancer, opera and operetta singer, actress and dance pedagogue

- Born: Ülle-Valve-Oktavie Ulla; November 10, 1934; Tallinn, Estonia
- Died: April 9, 2016 (aged 81) Tallinn, Estonia

Ülle-Valve-Oktavie Ulla (10 November 1934, Tallinn – 9 April 2016, Tallinn) was an Estonian ballerina, opera and operetta singer, actress and dance pedagogue. Her father was a railway official while her mother is a stenographer-typist who was also an actress of Hommikteater.

== Career ==
In 1946, she enrolled at the Estonian State Choreographical School, graduating in 1953.

From 1953 until 1966 and again from 1970 until 1973, she was a ballet soloist at Estonia Theatre. Ulla also performed in opera and operetta. After finishing her career as a ballet soloist, she performed in the Viru Variety Hall from 1972 until 1985. In the 1990s, she worked as a trainer and dance teacher at the Estonian Academy of Music and Theatre.

She has also played in several films.

In 1967, Ulla was the subject of the Leida Levald directed documentary film Ülle Ulla.

== Personal life ==
Ulla was married three times. Her first marriage was to dancer Eduard-Anatoli Hanson. From 1960 until 1971, she was married to actor Ago-Endrik Kerge, with whom she had a daughter. From 1972 until 1991, she was married to conductor Eri Klas.

She died on April 9, 2016, age 81.

== Acknowledgements ==
- Meritorious Artist of the Estonian SSR (1965)

== Filmography ==
- 1955: Kui saabub õhtu (role: Self - Mermaid)
- 1962: Õhtust hommikuni (role: Karin)
- 1985: Savoy ball (role: Bebe)
- 1991: Vana mees tahab koju (role: Nurse Koidula)
