= On the Water (film) =

2020 film

- Directed by: Peeter Simm
- Written by: Olavi Ruitlane
- Produced by: Marju Lepp; Manfred Vainokivi
- Starring: Rasmus Ermel
- Cinematography: Manfred Vainokivi
- Edited by: Kersti Miilen
- Production company: Filmivabrik
- Release date: 22 November 2020 (PÖFF)
- Running time: 95 minutes
- Country: Estonia
- Language: Estonian

On the Water (Estonian: Vee peal) is a 2020 Estonian drama film directed by Peeter Simm. It was selected as the Estonian entry for the Best International Feature Film at the 94th Academy Awards.

== Plot ==
In 1982, a teenager living with his grandparents comes of age in rural Soviet Estonia.

== Cast ==
- Rasmus Ermel as Andres
- Evelin Võigemast as Andres' mother
- Maria Klenskaja as Andres' grandmother
- Kalju Orro as Andres' grandfather
- Aurora Aleksandra Künnapas as Maria
- Marko Matvere as Valter
- Aarne Soro as Kolla
- Guido Kangur as Hiirekõrv
- Hilje Murel as Selma
- Liisa Aibel as Erika
- Anne Reemann as Püssa Helgi
- Terje Pennie as Manda
- Andres Lepik as Kalju
- Indrek Taalmaa as Liiva Heino
- Kärt Kross-Merilo as Henri's Mother
- Meelis Rämmeld as Fisherman

== See also ==
- List of submissions to the 94th Academy Awards for Best International Feature Film
- List of Estonian submissions for the Academy Award for Best International Feature Film
