= Ülle Toming =

Estonian dancer, actress, singer and dance pedagogue

Ülle Toming (born 16 February 1955) is an Estonian dancer, actress, singer and dance pedagogue.

Toming was born in Tallinn. In 1973 she graduated from Tallinn Choreographic School. In 1983 she graduated from Tallinn Pedagogical Institute with a degree in cultural education and in 1999 received her master's in cultural history in 1999. Toming has worked as a lecturer at Tallinn University since 1983, and was a dance teacher at the Tallinn Ballet School from 1989 until 1999.

1973–1992 she worked at bar-varieties Tallinn and Viru Folk-show. She has also played in several films. Toming was married to actor Jüri Krjukov from 1990 until his death in 1997.

== Filmography ==
- 1976 Aeg elada, aeg armastada
- 1989 Perekonnapildid
- 1998 Georgica
- 2008 Detsembrikuumus
- 2017 Mehetapja/Süütu/Vari
