= Passenger from the "Equator" =

- Directed by: Aleksandr Kurochkin
- Written by: Arnold Neggo
- Starring: Jüri Krjukov; Yuri Puss; Vyacheslav Tsyupa
- Cinematography: Yuri Malinovsky
- Music by: Mikael Tariverdiev
- Production company: Gorky Film Studio
- Release date: 1970
- Running time: 77 minutes
- Country: Soviet Union
- Language: Russian

Passenger from the "Equator" (Russian: Пассажир с «Экватора», romanized: Passazhir s «Ekvatora») is a 1970 Soviet children's adventure film directed by Aleksandr Kurochkin.

== Plot ==
Young swimmer Ilmar sails on the ship "Equator" to the pioneer camp, located somewhere on the Black Sea shore. Accidentally, he witnesses a strange event: one of the passengers, a foreigner (he is a magician and a "businessman"), Mr. Pipp secretly throws a suspicious object into the sea (radio beacon). Pipp discovers a boy nearby and fearing revelation, pushes him overboard, and no one notices what has occurred on the boat.

Some time later, the leader of the pioneer detachment finds Ilmar on the shore of the stormy sea, who does not remember how he came to be in the water. Everything looks as if he fell into the water from the pier. Soon Ilmar and his new friends in the pioneer camp will again meet with the mysterious stranger ...

== Cast ==
- Jüri Krjukov - Ilmar
- Yuri Puss - Glenn
- Vyacheslav Tsyupa - Andre
- Victor Morus - Igor
- Tatiana Goryachkina - Galya
- Igor Pushakov - Taratuta
- Sergey Makridin - Zhenya
- Mikhail Volkov - Philip Maximovich Kluchik, Hydroacoustic Engineer
- Alexander Martynov - Marat, the leader
- Arina Aleinikova - Natasha, the nurse
- Vladimir Kenigson - Pavel Alexandrovich Gabush
- Yuri Chekulaev - Mr. Pipp, passenger "merchant"
- Nikolai Gorlov - "The Lun," the old man
- Tamara Yarenko - Tamara Yakovlevna Kalinina, head of the pioneer camp
- Leonid Dovlatov - doctor
- Leonid Okunev

=== Vocals ===
Elena Kamburova — song The Little Prince.
