= Edgar Spriit =

Estonian journalist, satirist, editor and politician (1922–1993)

Edgar Spriit (born 29 September 1922 in Vihula Parish, Virumaa – 8 August 1993 in Tallinn) was an Estonian journalist, satirist, editor and politician. He was a member of VII Riigikogu.

He was married to journalist Ester Spriit (née Tartu; 1923–2006) and dancer Elonna Spriit. His children are Sirje Piho, Eero Spriit, and Egon Spriit.
