= Alo Bärengrub =

Estonian footballer

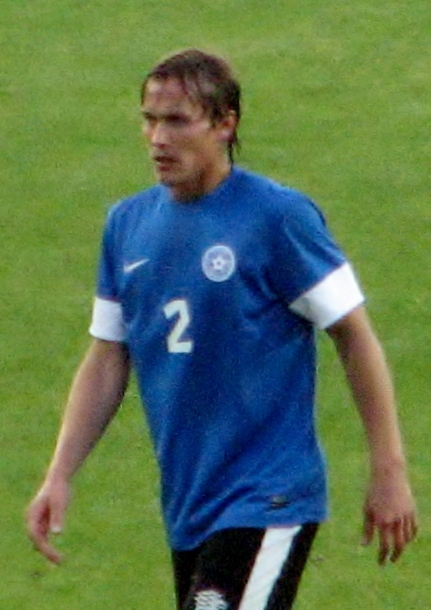
- Alo Bärengrub, in 2014.

Personal information
- Full name: Alo Bärengrub
- Date of birth: 12 February 1984 (age 42)
- Place of birth: Kehtna, Estonia
- Height: 1.82 m (6 ft 0 in)
- Position: Centre back

Senior career*
Years	Team	Apps	(Gls)
2000	Lelle	21	(0)
2001–2004	Valga	69	(2)
2004–2007	Flora	102	(22)
2008–2011	Bodø/Glimt	32	(2)
2011–2015	Nõmme Kalju	161	(12)
2016–2022	Raplamaa JK		
2023–2024	Tallinna Kalev Juunior		
2025–	TalTech	1	(0)

International career
2004–2014	Estonia	48	(0)
- * Club domestic league appearances and goals as of 17 April 2025

Alo Bärengrub (born 12 February 1984) is a retired Estonian professional footballer who played as a centre-back.

== Career ==
Bärengrub was born in Kehtna, and made his first-team debut for Lelle in Estonia's second division Esiliiga at the age of 16 in 2000. A year later he joined to Valga. After four seasons he moved to Flora in 2004 and, almost instantly, became an important player at the club. At the age of 23, after four seasons in Flora, Bärengrub moved abroad.

In January 2008, he signed a 4-year contract with Norwegian Tippeligaen club Bodø/Glimt. Bärengrub played his first Tippeligaen match on 30 March 2008, in a 2–0 win against HamKam. He scored his first Tippeligaen goal on 10 August 2008, in 3–2 victory over Viking. The contract was mutually terminated at the beginning of 2011 as the player did not get enough play time.

Bärengrub then had trials at League One side Notts County and Major League Soccer newcomers Portland Timbers. Although he impressed the manager at the latter club, he was left without a contract as the club had already exceeded the foreign players limit. The defender was also rejected at his old club Flora as the team decided to give youth players a chance.

On 4 March 2011, he signed 1+1 year contract with Nõmme Kalju. He played his first game for the club the next day in a 0–1 loss against Flora. He was one of three players to play every single minute of the league season, others being teammate Ken Kallaste and Narva Trans defender Tomas Rimas. On 28 December 2011, he signed a new two-year contract with the club.

== International career ==
Bärengrub played 48 games for Estonia national football team between 2004 and 2014.

== Honours ==
=== Club ===
Valga

- Esiliiga: 2002

Flora

- Estonian Supercup: 2004

Nõmme Kalju

- Meistriliiga: 2012
- Estonian Cup: 2014–15

== Personal ==
Bärengrub is married and has two daughters.
