= Keava =

Borough in Estonia

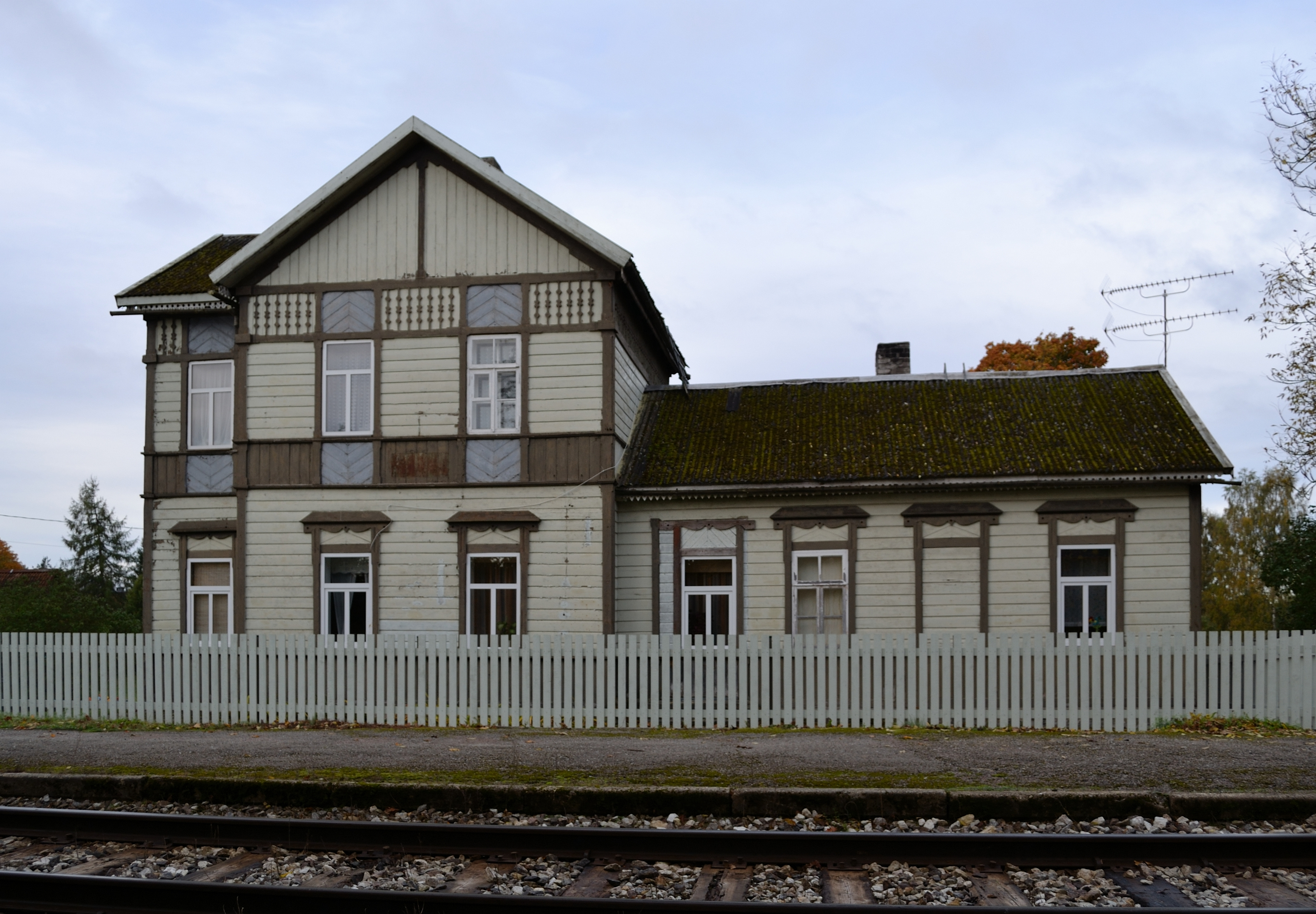
- Keava railway station

- Location within Estonia
- Coordinates: 58°56′N 24°53′E
- Country: Estonia
- County: Rapla County

Population (1 January 2007)
  - Total: 287
- Time zone: UTC+2 (EET)

Keava (German: Kedenpäh) is a small borough (alevik) in Kehtna Parish, Rapla County, Estonia. Population 287 (as of 1 January 2007). It has a railway station on the Tallinn–Viljandi railway line operated by Elron (rail transit).

== Keava hill fort ==
The remains of a hill fort, probably used as early as the second millennium BC, lie on a steep ridge in Keava. It was in use until the Middle Ages and may be identical to a castle raided, according to Russian chronicles, by Iziaslav I of Kiev in 1054. The hill fort consists of ramparts enclosing a courtyard measuring circa 55 metres (180 ft) by 20 metres (66 ft).
