= Kaerepere =

Borough in Estonia

- Location within Estonia
- Coordinates: 58°57′56″N 24°50′37″E
- Country: Estonia
- County: Rapla County
- Time zone: UTC+2 (EET)

Kaerepere is a small borough (alevik) in Kehtna Parish, Rapla County in central Estonia.
