= Villem Gross =

Estonian writer

Villem Gross (pseudonym Ott Varangu; born on 11 January 1922 Tartu – died on 6 April 2001) was an Estonian writer.

During World War II he served in the 8th Estonian Rifle Corps. After the war he held a journalist job. From 1950 he was a member of Estonian Writers' Union.

== Selected works ==
- 1955: play Ankeet ('Questionnaire')
- 1975: novel Talvepuhkus ('Winter Holiday')
- 1978: novel Vaikimise motiivid ('Motifs of Silence')
