= Lelle =

Borough in Estonia

- Small borough
- Location in Estonia
- Coordinates: 58°51′44″N 25°00′24″E
- Country: Estonia
- County: Rapla County
- Municipality: Kehtna Parish
- First mentioned: 1559

Population (2011 Census)
  - Total: 339

Lelle is a small borough (alevik) in Kehtna Parish, Rapla County, in central Estonia. It has a station on the Tallinn - Viljandi railway line operated by Elron, and until December 2018 was the junction with the former branch to Pärnu. As of the 2011 census, the settlement's population was 339.

Lelle Manor was first mentioned in 1559.

Music festival Lelle Alternatiiv took place in Lelle. First festival took place in 2004. Last festival took place in 2010.

== Gallery ==
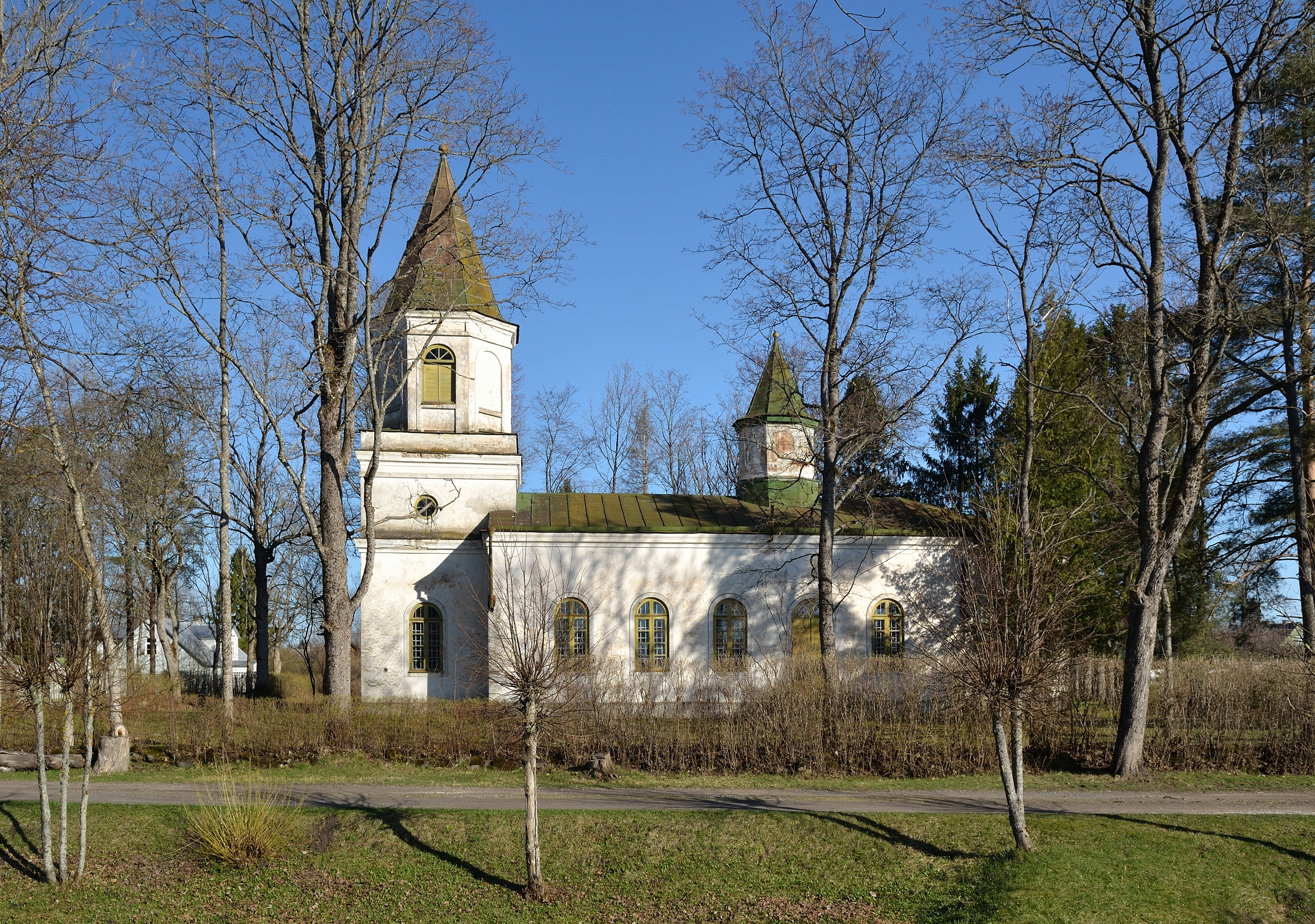
Lelle church

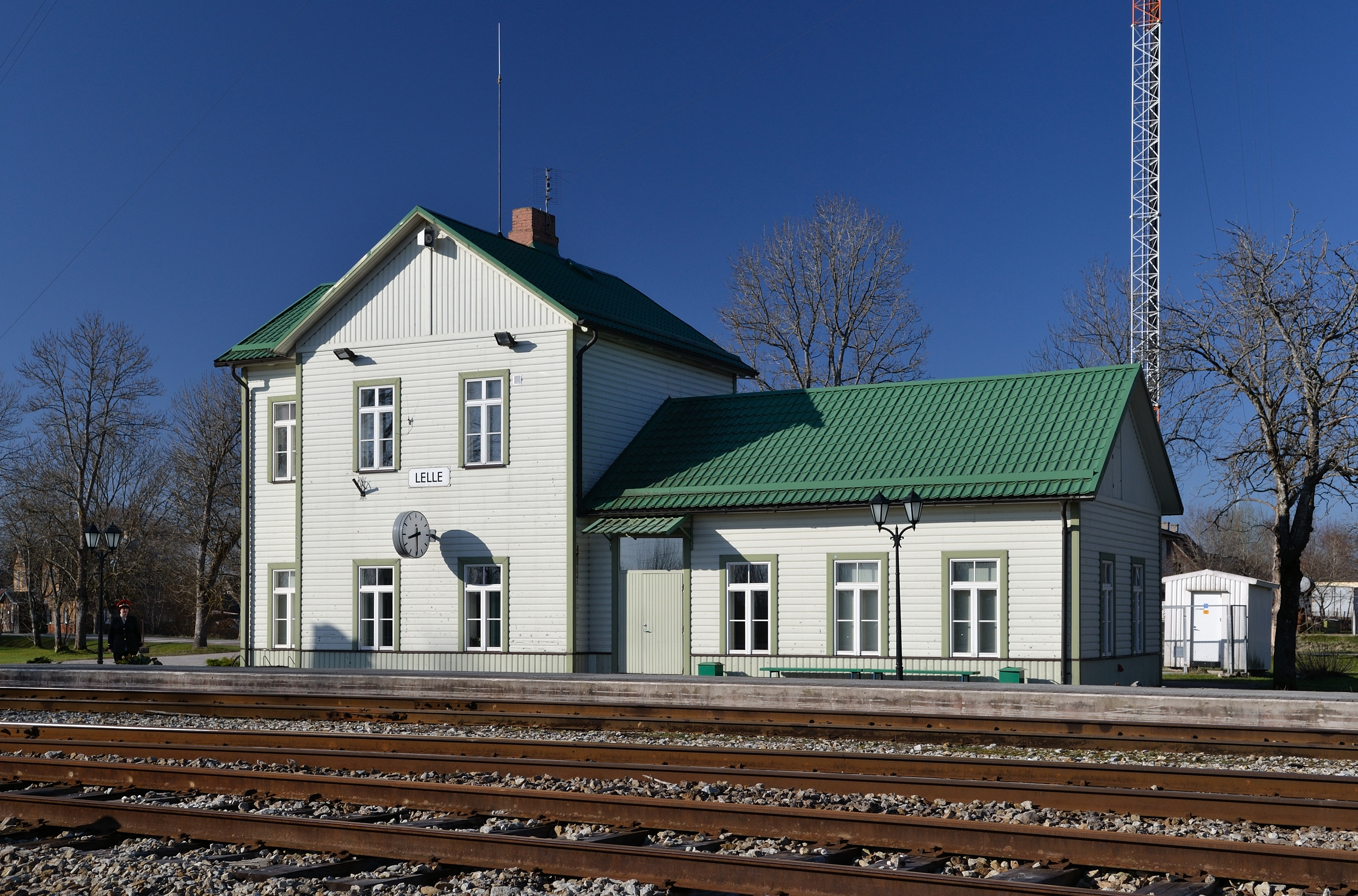
Lelle station building

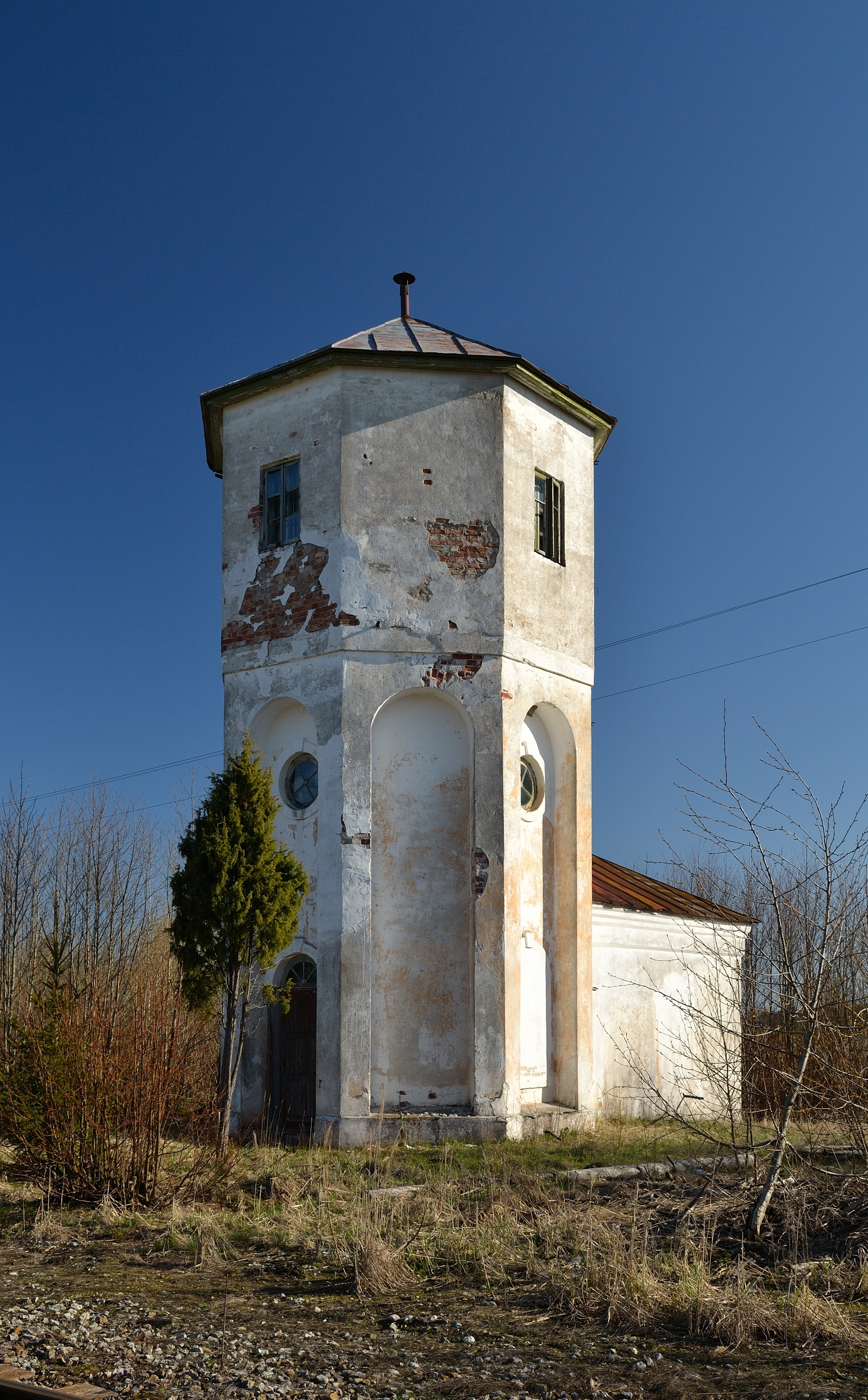
Lelle station water tower

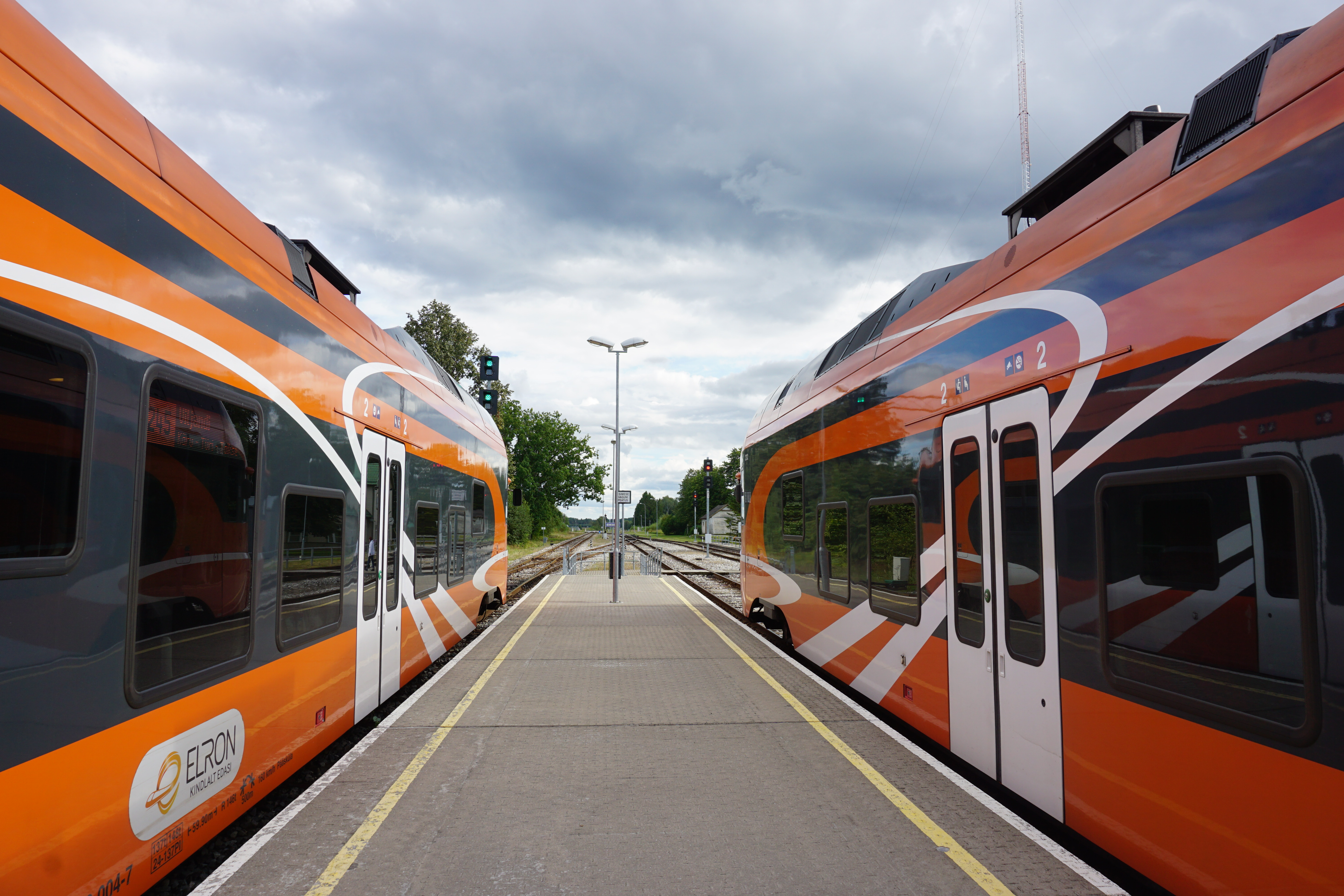
Trains in Lelle station

== See also ==
- Lelle SK
- FC Lelle
