= Annual Awards of Estonian Theatre =

Annual awards issued by Estonian Theatre Union

Annual Awards of Estonian Theatre (Estonian: Eesti teatri aastaauhinnad) are annual theatrical awards issued by Estonian Theatre Union. Awards are given out to recognize persons and organizations on account of theirs theatrical achievements for Estonian theatre.

Awards are issued since 1961, and it takes place every year on 27 March.

== Categories ==
There are many categories of awards, and also awards named after Estonian theatrical personnel:

- Award for theatrical director (Estonian: Lavastajaauhind)
- Award for theatrical artist (Estonian: Kunstnikuauhind)

=== Awards named after Estonian theatrical personnel ===
- Ants Lauter Award (annually, since 1974)
- Georg Ots Musical Theatre Award (Estonian: Georg Otsa nimeline muusikateatri auhind) (biannually)
