= Merle Karusoo =

Estonian stage director and writer (born 1944)

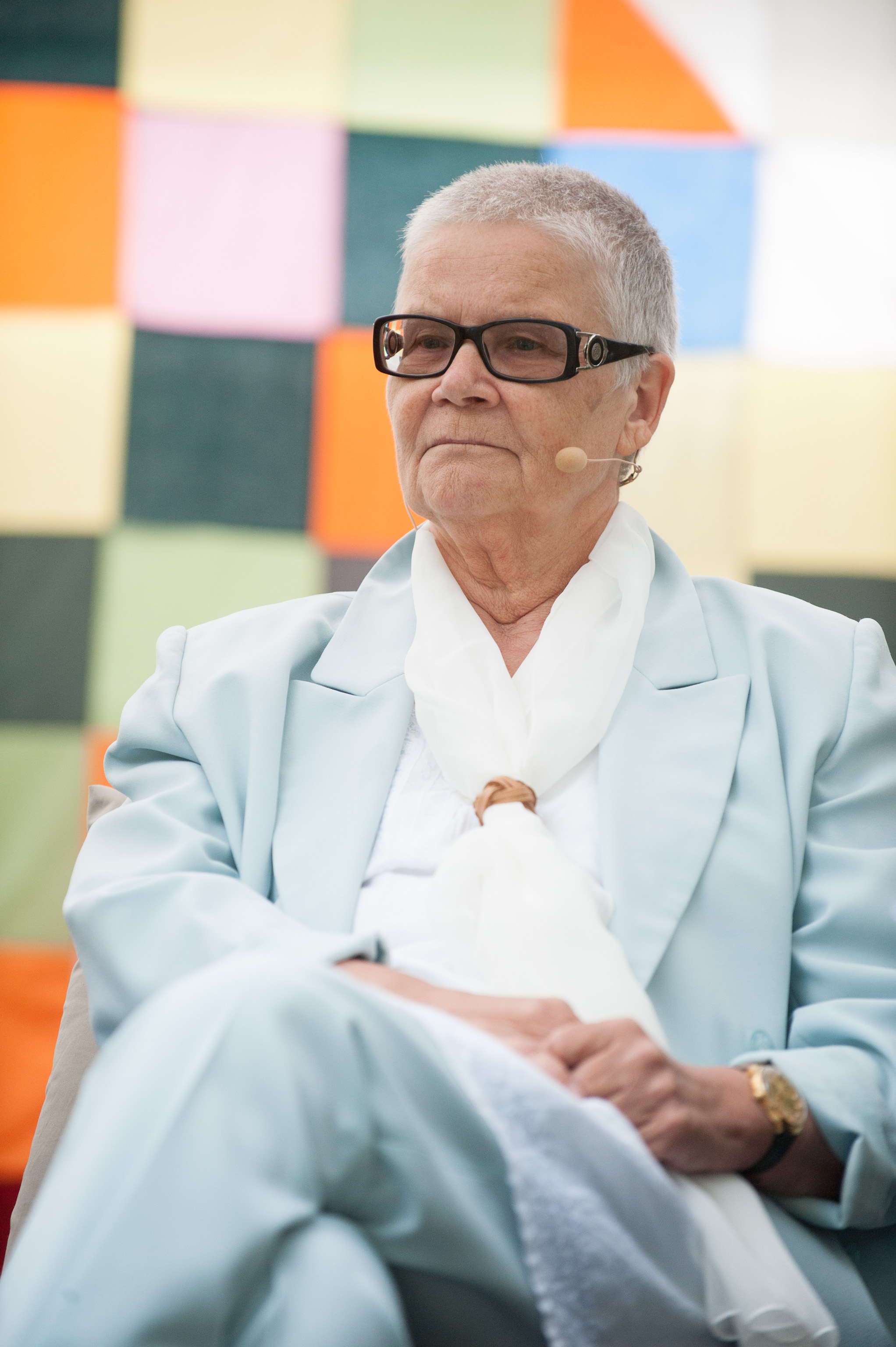
Merle Karusoo

Merle Karusoo (born 1 July 1944 in Rae Parish) is an Estonian stage director and writer. She is also known as a collector of Estonian biographies.

In 1972, she graduated from University of Tartu in Estonian philology. In 1999, she defended her master's thesis in sociology at Tallinn Pedagogical University.

She has worked as a director at the Estonian Drama Theatre and the Estonian State Youth Theater.

Karusoo has worked as a course instructor and lecturer at the Estonian Academy of Music and Theatre and the University of Tartu Viljandi Culture Academy. Since 2014, she has been a Professor of Liberal Arts, teaching at the University of Tartu.

== Awards ==
- 1980 Ants Lauter Award
- 1981 Juhan Smuul literary award
- 1990 Merited Artist of the ESSR
- 2001 Order of the White Star, IV class

== Selected works ==
- 1981: play "Ma olen 13-aastane" ('I Am 13')
- 1982: play "Meie elulood" ('Our Life Stories')
- 1997: play "Kured läinud, kurjad ilmad" ('The Cranes Are Gone, the Weather's Bad')
