= Anne Paluver =

Estonian actress

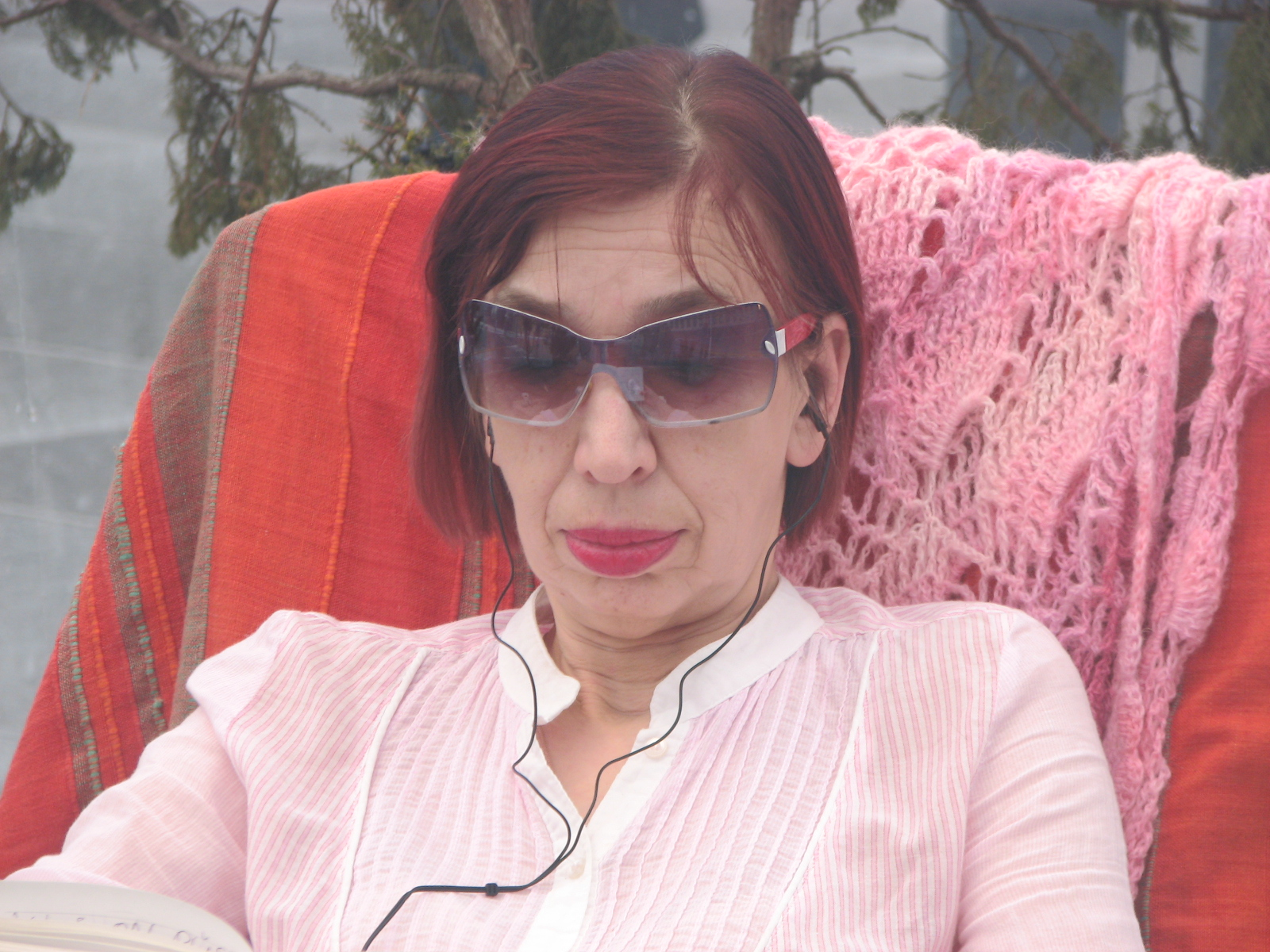
Anne Paluver in 2011

Anne Paluver (born 4 November 1952 in Tallinn) is an Estonian actress known for her work in film, television, and animation.

== Early life and education ==
Paluver was born in Tallinn, the daughter of mathematician Nikolai Paluver. She attended schools in Tallinn, graduating from Tallinn No. 22 Secondary School in 1970 (now the Jakob Westholm Gymnasium). She studied mathematics at the University of Tartu before enrolling at the Tallinn State Conservatory in 1972 to study acting at the institution's Performing Arts Department. From 1976 until 1995, she worked at Estonian Drama Theatre and from 1995 until 2004, at the Vanalinnastuudio. Since 2005 she has been a freelance actress. Besides theatre roles she has played also in several films and television series.

== Personal life ==
Paluver was married to actor Toomas Ots, with whom she has two daughters. She had been in a relationship with actor Paul Poom, with whom she has a son.

== Awards ==
- 2012: Oskar Luts humor prize

== Filmography ==
Year	Title	Role
1976	Aeg elada, aeg armastada	Epp
1989	Äratus	Salme Peterson
1997	Minu Leninid	Bolshevik
2004	Sigade revolutsioon	Staabi mutt
2005	Kõrini!	Hostess
2007	Põhjakonn (Animated film)	Voice role
2008	Eestlane ja venelane	Mutt
2010–2019	ENSV	Partorg
2013	Elavad pildid	Saksa vanaproua
2013	Kaastundeavaldus	Helle
2018	Klassikokkutulek 2: Pulmad ja matused	Helle
2018	Elu hammasratastel	Supporting role
2020	Toru töö	Juta
2021	Jahihooaeg	Eva’s boss's wife
2024	Infinite Summer	Grandma
