= Ago-Endrik Kerge =

Estonian dancer, ballet master, director, and actor (1939–2021)

Ago-Endrik Kerge (also Endrik Kerge; 8 April 1939 Tallinn – 25 April 2021) was an Estonian dancer, ballet master, director and actor.

== Life and Career ==
In 1959 he graduated from Tallinn Choreographic School. In 1976 he graduated from the Tallinn State Conservatory Stage Art Department. From 1959 to 1976 (intermittently), he was a ballet soloist at the Estonia Theatre. From 1967 to 1969, he was a ballet soloist at Leningrad Music Hall.

From 16 October 2004 to 2005, Ago-Endrik Kerge was an alternate member of the Estonian Parliament, representing the Res Publica Party.

Kerge was married to the ballerina, actress, and singer Ülle Ulla from 1962 until their divorce in 1971. In 1983 he married the actress Elle Kull.

Awards:

- 1967: Meritorious Artist of the Estonian SSR
- 2001: Order of the White Star, V class.

== Selected filmography ==
- 1985 Kahe kodu ballaad I jagu (television feature film; director, and role: Priidik)
- 1986 Saja aasta pärast mais (feature film; role: Foreign minister Piip)
- 1992 Need vanad armastuskirjad (television feature film; role: General)
- 1993 Õnne 13 (television series; role: Einar Karmik)
- 1995 Wikmani poisid (television series; role: Bishop)
- 2019 Klassikokkutulek 3: Ristiisad (feature film; role: Father-in-law)
