= Kehtna Parish =

Municipality of Estonia

Coordinates: 58°55′49″N 24°52′41″E

Kehtna Parish Kehtna vald
- Municipality of Estonia
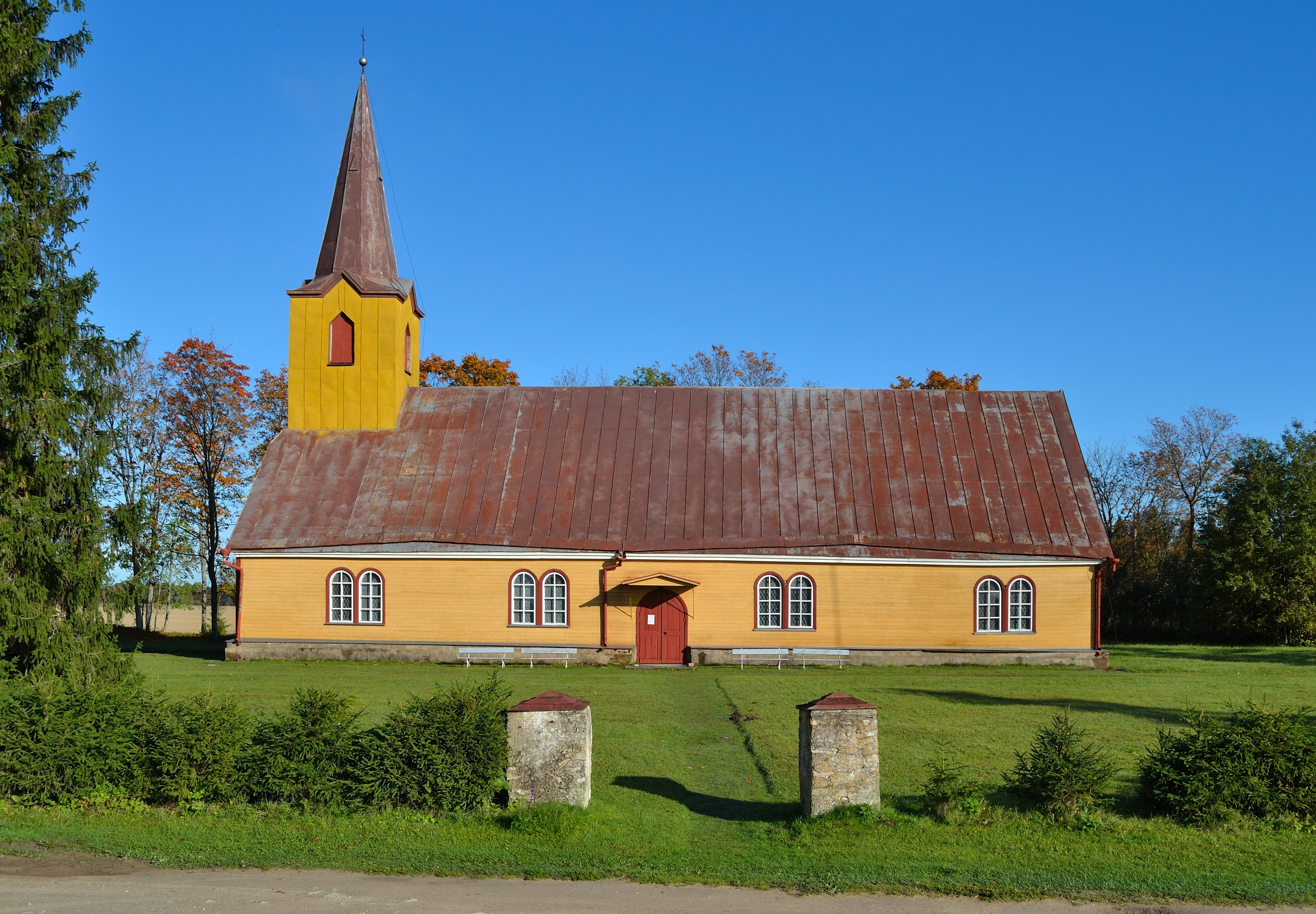
- Kehtna church in Lellapere

- Flag Coat of arms

- Kehtna Parish within Rapla County.
- Country: Estonia
- County: Rapla County
- Administrative centre: Kehtna

Area
  - Total: 512 km^{2} (198 sq mi)

Population (2026)
  - Total: 5,328
  - Density: 10.4/km^{2} (27.0/sq mi)
- ISO 3166 code: EE-293
- Website: www.kehtna.ee

Kehtna Parish (Estonian: Kehtna vald) is a rural municipality in central Estonia. It is a part of Rapla County. The municipality has a population of 5328 (as of 1 January 2026) and covers an area of 507.3 km^{2}. The population density is 10.5/km^{2} (27.2/sq mi).

== Demographics ==
As of 1 January 2026, the parish had 5,328 residents, of which 2,733 (51.3%) were women and 2,595 (48.7%) were men.

=== Settlements ===
The parish contains one large borough, Järvakandi. The administrative centre of the municipality is the small borough of Kehtna. The other small boroughs are Eidapere, Kaerepere, Keava and Lelle. There are a total of 43 villages in the parish.

=== Religion ===
The religious landscape of Kehtna parish is predominantly secular, with 82.7% of the population identifying as unaffiliated with any religion. Among those who do associate with a faith, 10.4% identify as Lutheran. The Orthodox community constitutes 2.4%, while other Christian denominations make up 2.0% of the population. A smaller segment of the population, 0.6%, follows other religions, while 1.9% of individuals did not specify their religious affiliation.

== Notable people ==
- Johan Meimer (1904 in Kehtna – 1944), athlete, competed in the javelin and the decathlon at the 1928 Summer Olympics, also a forest brother
- Mihkel Hansen (1904 in Lelle – 2004), politician, Governor of Valga County, 1937 to 1940
- Paul Rummo (1909 in Kalbu – 1981), poet, playwright, and literary critic; also head of the Estonia Theatre
- Külliki Saldre (born 1952 in Kehtna), stage, TV, radio and film actress.
- Taavi Veskimägi (born 1974 in Eidapere), politician and Minister of Finance, 2003–2005
- Vjatšeslav Zahovaiko (born 1981 in Lelle), football coach and former player, played over 350 games and 39 for Estonia
- Alo Bärengrub (born 1984 in Kehtna), footballer, who played over 370 games and 46 for Estonia
- Alo Dupikov (born 1985 in Kehtna), footballer, who played over 400 games and 5 for Estonia
