= Tõrma =

Tõrma may refer to several places in Estonia:

- Tõrma, Lääne-Viru County, village in Rakvere Parish, Lääne-Viru County
- Tõrma, Rapla County, village in Rapla Parish, Rapla County

== See also ==
- Torma (disambiguation)
