= Toomas Jürgenstein =

Estonian politician

Toomas Jürgenstein (born 23 July 1964 in Ridalepa village, Pärnu County) is an Estonian educator and politician. He was a member of the XIII Riigikogu.

In 1989 he graduated from University of Tartu in biology, and in 1996 in theology.

During his studies at the University of Tartu, Jürgenstein worked as a laboratory assistant and engineer at the Estonian Institute of Zoology and Botany, and from 1989 to 1992 as a teacher of biology, chemistry and geography at Krabi Basic School. Since 1996 he has been teaching at the Hugo Treffner Gymnasium, mainly religious studies and philosophy. He has also taught philosophy at the Miina Härma Gymnasium and Jaan Poska Gymnasium. He has lectured at the University of Tartu, the Higher Theological Seminary, the Institute of Theology of the Estonian Evangelical Lutheran Church, the Theological Seminary of the Estonian Methodist Church and the Tartu Academy of Theology.

Since 2001 he has been a member of the Estonian Social Democratic Party.

He is a member of the student corporation Ugala.
