= Illar Hallaste =

Estonian clergyman, politician

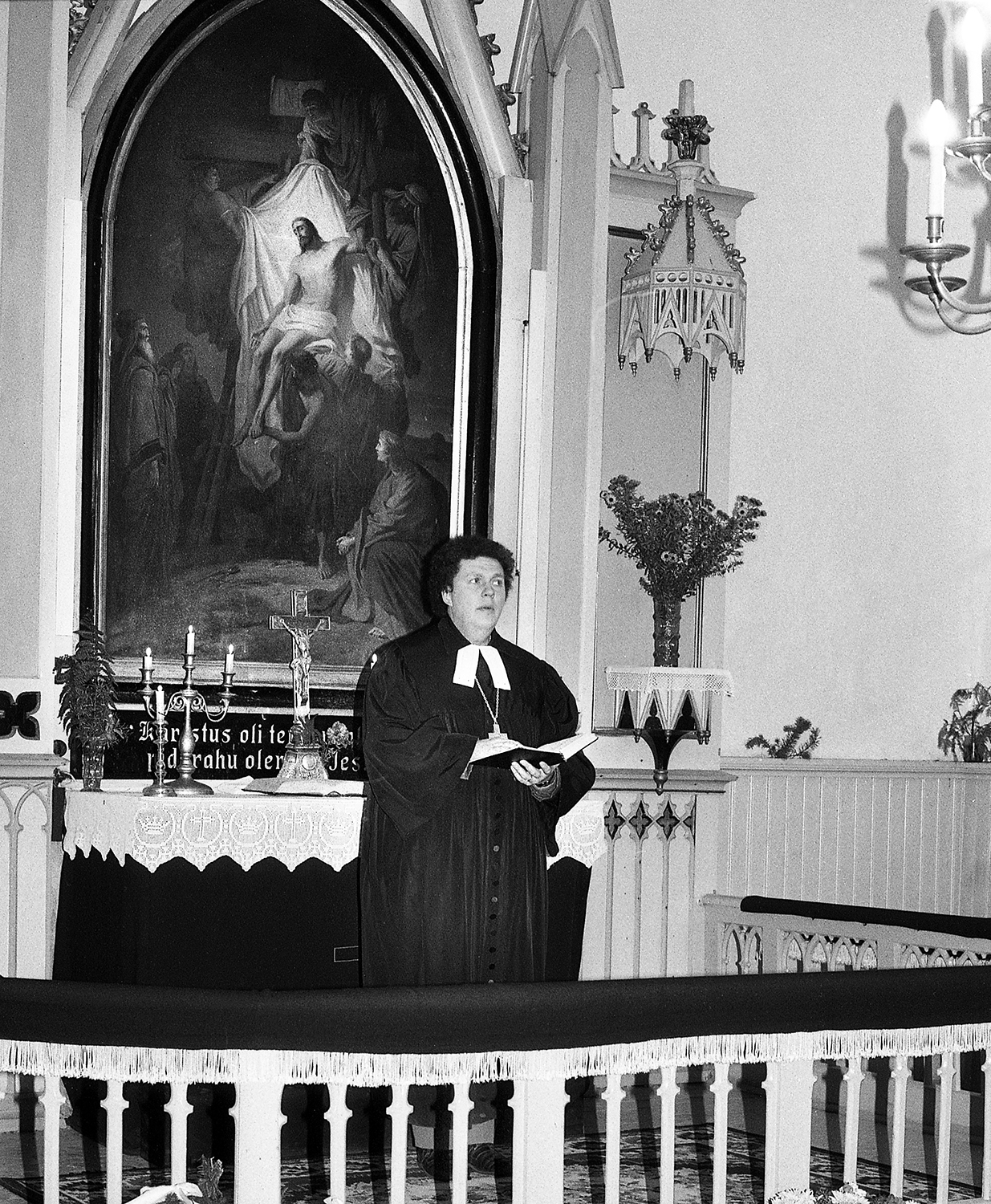
Illar Hallaste, 1988

Illar Hallaste (6 May 1959 in Kohtla-Järve – 27 October 2012 in Tallinn) was an Estonian cleric, politician, lawyer, and businessman, most notable for being a voter for the Estonian restoration of Independence.

== Education ==
Hallaste studied in Kohtla-Järve, and from the 7th grade in the Otepää branch of the Tallinn Sports Secondary School. In 1977, he graduated from Kohtla-Järve Secondary High School. After graduating from high school, Hallaste began studying at the Faculty of Law of the University of Tartu, where he was thrown out for being religious, which was discouraged by the Soviet government at the time. He eventually graduated in 1995.

After graduating from the University of Tartu, Hallaste began studying at the Institute of Theology of the Estonian Evangelical Lutheran Church. In 1982, he was ordained a teacher at St Mary's Cathedral, Tallinn.

== Career ==
Hallaste served a number of parish throughout the late 20th century, including in Laiuse and Palamuse parishes from 1982 to 1983, Torma and Kodavere parishes from 1983 to 1988, and Kadrina and Ilumäe parishes from 1988 to 1993. From 2005 to his death in 2012, he was a vicar teacher in Ida-Harju. He has also served as deputy head of the Järva provost and eastern Harju Assistance Front.

After leaving politics, Hallaste established the law office of the same name and offered legal services. Lastly, he headed the company Viimars OÜ. In addition, he organized the Season Travel travel agency and was a member of the Board of the Kirik Varahaldus OÜ, the company managing the real estate of EELK.

== Political career ==
Hallaste became a part of politics through the heritage protection movement. In October 1988, he attempted to stand in the Rakvere District against the "official" candidate nominated by the Communist Party, Vaino Väljas, in the replacement of the Supreme Soviet of the Estonian SSR, and created a precedent in post-war Estonia. However, bringing the formal reasons to excuse (a meeting of the group setting up the working group was convened as a trade union group, not as a trade union committee), he was denied the candidacy. In March 1989, Hallaste applied for election to the Congress of People's Deputies of the Soviet Union in the same constituency, but remained under Siim Kallas in 1989. In 1989, he was one of the founders of the Estonian Christian Union (later the Estonian Christian-Democratic Union) and was its chairman until 1992. EKDL considered itself the successor to the Christian People's Party founded in 1919. Between 1990 and 1992, he was a member of the Estonian Supreme Soviet and the Congress of Estonia, the 1990 Estonian Committee and the 1991-1992 Constituent Assembly. He was among the 69 members of the Supreme Council of the Republic of Estonia who on 20 August 1991 voted for the Estonian restoration of Independence.

In the Riigikogu elections in 1992, the EKDL participated in the election campaign of "Isamaa" with the Conservative People's Party of Estonia, the Estonian Christian Democratic Party, the Republican Conservatives, and the Estonian Liberal Democratic Party (ELDP). The election coalition was the winner, receiving 22.00% of the votes and 29 seats in the Riigikogu. After the election, in the same year, the EKDL joined all but the ELDP, forming a new party: the Pro Patria National Coalition Party. Hallaste lost his position as party leader (Mart Laar later became the leader of the new party), but Hallaste was a member of the Riigikogu from 1992 to 1995. Hallaste led the Pro Patria National Coalition Party until 27 October 1993. On 30 June 1994, he left the faction and joined the Right-wing faction, whose members were members of the People's Party of Republicans and Conservatives on 9 October 1994, as the founders of the newly formed Party of the Republicans from the Republican and Conservative People's Party (VKRE). On April 5, 1998, the VKRE joined the Estonian Peasantry Party, forming the Estonian People's Party, but was compulsorily terminated on 14 December 1999 because it failed to comply with the 1000-member requirement of the new Political Parties Act.

In 1998, Hallaste and businessman Toivo Ninnas were caught in a sex scandal involving inviting ten female guests to the Viking hotel in Pärnu. Ninna and Hallaste denied the allegations, but the People's Party forced out Hallaste. As a result of the scandal, former president Arnold Rüütel did not award him the same award given to all members of the Supreme Council who voted on 20 August 1991 to restore Estonia's independence. "I have not seen this list," Hallaste said of the President's decision. "Everyone who voted [for independence] got the award except for me. Why can't I? Is morale a thing? For me, this is completely incomprehensible...".

In 2000, police in Tallinn fined Hallaste for going 107 km/h on the freeway while driving under the influence, despite being part of the leadership of the Alcohol Policy Council.

From 2001 to his death, Hallaste was a part of the Estonian Reform Party.

== Personal life ==
In 1978, Hallaste married Hilja Seppenen. They had eight children (three sons and five daughters).

== Bibliography ==
- Hallaste, Illar "Eesti Vabariigi põhiseaduse sünd" Juridica 9/1996, pages 438–442
- Hallaste, Illar. "Kanoonilise õiguse käsiraamat". 2011
