= Kuuskemaa =

Kuuskemaa is an Estonian surname. Notable people with the surname include:

- Betty Kuuskemaa (1879–1966), Estonian stage and film actress
- Jüri Kuuskemaa (born 1942), Estonian art historian and curator
