= Saunaküla Landscape Conservation Area =

Protected area in Estonia

- Location within Estonia
- Location: Estonia
- Coordinates: 59°11′20″N 24°42′00″E
- Area: 26 ha (64 acres)
- Established: 1973 (2018)

Saunaküla Landscape Conservation Area is a nature park which is located in Rapla County, Estonia.

The area of the nature park is 26 ha.

The protected area was founded in 1973 to protect Hageri-Sutlema coastal formations (Estonian: rannamoodustised).
