= Torm =

Torm may refer to:

- "Torm" (Jüri Pootsmann song), 2015
- "Torm", a song by Terminaator from Lõputu päev, 1994
- Dampskibsselskabet Torm, a Danish shipping company
- Ditlev Torm (1836-1907), Danish businessman, co-founder of Dampskibsselskabet Torm

== See also ==
- Torma (disambiguation)
