= Torma (disambiguation) =

Torma is a Tibetan Buddhist ritual offering cake.

Torma may also refer to:

- Torma (surname), Hungarian surname
- Torma, Estonia, a small borough in Jõgeva County, Estonia
  - Torma Parish, former municipality in Jõgeva County, Estonia
- Tõrma, Lääne-Viru County, a village in Estonia
- Tõrma, Rapla County, a village in Estonia
- Törmä, a village in Finland
