= Dorpat (disambiguation) =

Dorpat is the old name of Tartu, the second largest city in Estonia. Derived from that, it may refer to:

- Bishopric of Dorpat (1224–1558), Prince-Bishopric of Terra Mariana, Holy Roman Empire
- Dorpat Voivodeship (1598–1621), voievodeship of Duchy of Livonia, Polish-Lithuanian Commonwealth
- Kreis Dorpat (1893–1918), county in Governorate of Livonia, Russian Empire
- University of Tartu, previously known as Universität Dorpat (University of Dorpat)
- Treaty of Dorpat (1564), treaty between Sweden and Russia during the Livonian War

Dorpat may also refer to:

- Paul Dorpat (1938–2026), American historian, author, and photographer

== See also ==
- Tartu (disambiguation)
