= Elmar Jaanimägi =

Estonian artist (1907–1937)

- Born: March 4, 1907; Tallinn, Governorate of Estonia, Russian Empire
- Died: November 3, 1937 (aged 30); Viipuri, Finland (now Vyborg, Russia)
- Resting place: Hageri cemetery
- Occupations: Artist and caricaturist

Elmar Jaanimägi (sometimes also credited as Elmar Janimägi, March 4, 1907 – November 3, 1937) was an Estonian artist and caricaturist.

== Early life and education ==
Jaanimägi was born in Tallinn, the son of the railway worker Hans Josua Jaanimägi (previously Janimeggi, 1873–1955) and Katharina Anette Jaanimägi (née Runge, 1878–?). He attended Jakob Westholm High School and studied at the State Industrial Art School from 1923 to 1924. He trained further at Anatoly Kaigorodov's studio.

== Career ==
Jaanimägi first worked as a poster artist for cinemas in Tallinn and Nõmme. In 1931, he traveled abroad, where he held exhibitions of his caricatures in Latvia and Lithuania. In 1929, he worked as a set design artist for the drama film Dollarid. From 1930 to 1931, he worked with the cinematographer and entrepreneur Voldemar Päts at the studio of the well-known photographer Aleksander Teppor on Suur-Karja Street in Tallinn on the first Estonian animated film, Kutsu-Juku seiklusi (The Adventures of Juku the Dog). The film premiered at the Modern cinema in Tallinn on April 30, 1931. He was so interested in cartoons that in January 1937 the newspaper Esmaspäev wrote that Jaanimägi was making a new cartoon, Kaval Ants ja Wanapagan (Crafty Hans and the Old Devil). For this purpose, drawn sample characters were already ready, which were also published in the newspaper. However, this film was never completed.

== Death ==
In 1937, Jaanimägi went to work and live in Finland. Two months later, on November 3, 1937, he was the victim of a stabbing in Viipuri (now Vyborg, Russia). His killer was a drunk former office clerk, Eero David Taurio, with whom he shared an apartment there. Jaanimägi's funeral took place on November 13 in the crematorium chapel in Helsinki, Finland, and his body was cremated. His sister brought the ashes to Estonia, where they were buried in Hageri cemetery. A commemorative stone with a drawing from the film Kutsu-Juku seiklusi stands on his grave.

== Exhibitions ==
- 1932: Caricature exhibition in Tallinn at Harju Street (Estonian: Harju tänav) no. 37
- 1933: Caricature exhibition in Tartu
- 1933: Caricature exhibition in Narva-Jõesuu
- 1935: Caricature exhibition in Pärnu
- 1936: Caricature exhibition in Võru

== Filmography ==
- 1929: Dollarid (Dollars): set design
- 1931: Kutsu-Juku seiklusi (The Adventures of Juku the Dog): animation
