= Laenatud naene =

1913 film

- Produced by: Semen Mintus
- Starring: August Kuuskemaa; Betty Kuuskemaa; Paul Pinna; Alfred Sällik
- Release date: May 28, 1913
- Running time: 17 minutes
- Country: Estonia
- Language: Estonian

Laenatud naene (English: The Borrowed Wife) is a 1913 Estonian short comedy film that was filmed in Tallinn in 1912 at the latest. It is the oldest known Estonian feature film. Previously, Johannes Pääsuke's Karujaht Pärnumaal was considered the oldest Estonian feature film.

The names of the director and cinematographer are unknown. Various newspapers indicate that the producer was the Riga businessman Semen Mintus, who came from a Jewish family and owned the local Coliseum cinema, and whose distributor T/D Mintus is also mentioned in the first Latvian feature film Kur patiesība?! Ebreju kursistes traģēdija (Where Is the Truth?! The Tragedy of a Jewish Schoolgirl) from 1913.

Among the actors are Paul Pinna (as the uncle of the main character) and Alfred Sällik (as the servant). Laenatud naene was filmed in Tallinn. Pikk Street, Fat Margaret, the Patkuli Steps, and Snelli Pond are recognizable from the exterior views.

The original on a nitrate base has been destroyed, but a copy on film strip has survived in good condition. The credits and intertexts have not been preserved; only the locations of the latter can be seen. The only known copy of the film is preserved in the Gosfilmofond in Russia.

The film is based on the play of the same name, which was translated from an unidentified German or Swedish original into Estonian by Mihkel Aitsam in 1908. In it, a nephew asks a rich uncle for money to support his non-existent family. When his uncle visits, the nephew borrows his wife and children, but suddenly his "wife" and uncle fall in love. Peeter Simm, the chairman of the Estonian Cinema Association, characterized the film as "a mischievous story played in a grotesque tone, the most interesting part of which is perhaps the well-known places in Tallinn." According to Jaak Juske, some of the shots had to have been filmed in January 1912 or even earlier because the power plant building, whose construction started at the end of January 1912 and was completed at the time of the premiere of Laenatud naene in 1913, cannot be seen in the view through the Great Coastal Gate.

In 2017, the film was restored by Mart Sander. His dubbed, subtitled, colorized, and speed-corrected version runs 22 minutes.

== Plot ==
The main character lives a carefree bachelor's life. However, in order to receive money to live on from his rich uncle Paul Pinna, he has pretended that he has married and become a father. When the uncle announces in his letter that he is about to visit, the main character sets out to find a "borrowed wife" for the duration of the visit. He desperately tries to persuade women on the city streets, on the ice, and on the slope of Toompea. Having found a sympathetic "wife", he rushes to the train station to meet his uncle. At home, the uncle distributes gifts, but he wants to see the child. The main character rushes outside to look for a suitable child, but at the same time the uncle befriends the young lady and learns the truth, which pleases him. Now the uncle can ask for the woman's hand in marriage, and his feelings are reciprocated. When the nephew arrives home with a stolen child, a happy couple awaits him and a generous uncle who forgives his deceptions.
