= Reeli Reinaus =

Estonian children's writer

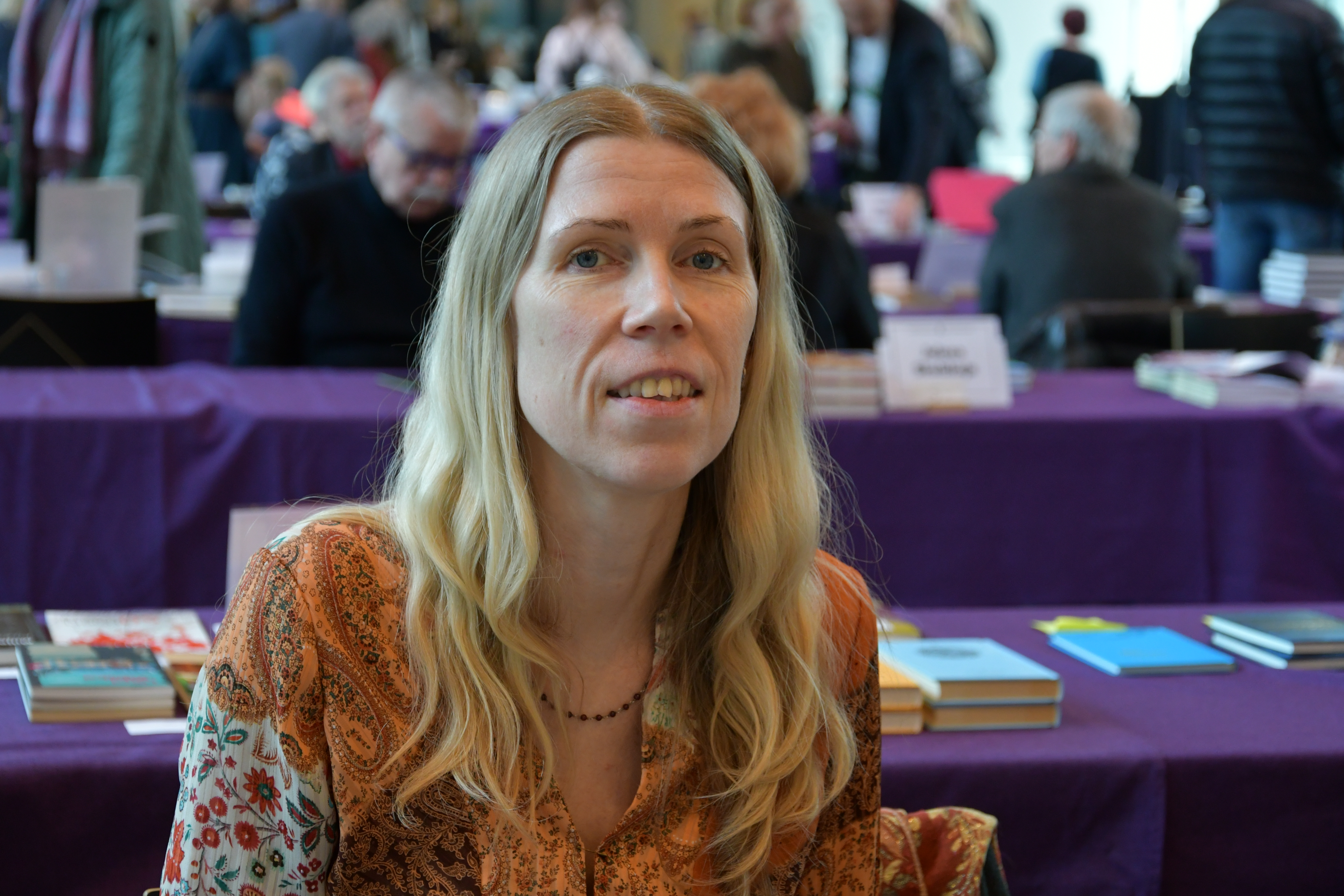
Reeli Reinaus (2025)

Reeli Reinaus (born 12 November 1977) is a contemporary Estonian children’s writer.

Born in Keila, she graduated from the Tartu Academy of Theology, and received a master's degree in Estonian and comparative folklore from the University of Tartu. Reinaus has worked at the University of Tartu and currently works at the Estonian Literary Museum.

== Writing career ==
Reinaus has written over twenty works for children and young adults. They include short stories about everyday life, books that address common problems, crime novels, thrillers woven with the supernatural, and picture books for toddlers.

== Bibliography ==
- Saladuslik päevik (The Mysterious Diary), Tänapäev 2008
- Mõistatus lossivaremetes (The Mystery in the Castle Ruins), Tänapäev 2009
- Täiesti tavaline perekond (A Totally Ordinary Family), Tänapäev 2010
- Nõidkapteni needus (The Curse of the Witch Captain), Tänapäev 2010
- Must vares (Black Crow), Tänapäev 2010
- Vaevatud (Troubled), Tänapäev 2011
- Tavalised hambahaldjad (Ordinary Tooth Fairies), Tänapäev 2011
- Kivid, tulnukad ja sekt (Stones, Aliens, and a Cult), Tänapäev 2011
- Nahka kriipivad nädalad (The Weeks That Graze), Tänapäev 2012
- Aguliurka lapsed (The Kids of Slum Lane), Tänapäev 2012
- Poisid Mustalt Hobuselt (The Boys of the Black Horse), Tänapäev 2013
- Kliinilised valed (Clinical Lies), Varrak, 2013, 213 pp
- Detektiiv Triibik loomaaias (Detective Stripes at the Zoo), Tänapäev 2013, 2017
- Roosad inglid (Pink Angels), Tänapäev 2014
- Deemoni märk (The Sign of the Demon), Varrak 2014
- Suhkrust ja jahust (Sugar and Flour), Tänapäev 2015
- Pärdik Päär ja hauaröövlid (Ducky Duke and the Grave Robbers), Tänapäev 2015
- Verikambi (The Verikambi Mill), Varrak 2016, 351 pp
- Kuidas mu isa endale uue naise sai (How My Dad Got a New Wife), Tänapäev 2016
- Vanalinna detektiivid. Mustpeade maalid (Old Town Detectives. The Paintings of the Brotherhood of Blackheads), Tänapäev 2017
- Suusi ja kadunud uni (Susie and the Lost Sleep), Päike ja Pilv 2017
- San Agustini vereohvrid (The Blood Sacrifices of San Agustin), Tänapäev 2017
- Mõõkade äss (Ace of Swords), Varrak 2017
- Maarius, maagia ja libahunt Liisi (Marius, Magic, and Lisa the Werewolf), Päike ja Pilv 2017
- Vanalinna detektiivid. Verega kirjutatud read (Old Town Detectives: Writing in Blood), Tänapäev 2018
- Roosi märgi all, Varrak 2019

== Awards ==
- 2008 Children’s Story Competition “My First Book”, 2nd place (The Mysterious Diary)
- 2009 Youth Novel Competition, 1st place (Black Crow)
- 2009 Children’s Story Competition “My First Book”, 3rd place (A Totally Ordinary Family)
- 2011 Youth Novel Competition, 2nd and 3rd places (The Weeks That Graze and Troubled)
- 2012 Children’s Story Competition “My First Book”, 1st and 2nd places (The Kids of Slum Lane and Detective Stripes at the Zoo)
- 2013 Good Children’s Book (Detective Stripes at the Zoo)
- 2014 Youth Novel Competition, 2nd place (Sugar and Flour)
- 2014 Children’s Story Competition “My First Book”, honourable mention (Pink Angels)
- 2015 Children’s Story Competition “My First Book”, 1st place (How My Dad Got a New Wife)
- 2016 Good Children’s Book (How My Dad Got a New Wife)
- 2016 “Järje Hoidja” Award of the Tallinn Central Library (The Verikambi Mill)
- 2017 Good Young Adult Book (Ace of Swords)
- 2017 Good Children’s Book (Marius, Magic, and Lisa the Werewolf)
- 2017 Tartu Prize for Children’s Literature (Childhood Prize) (How My Dad Got a New Wife)
- 2018 Children and Youth Drama Competition, 1st place (The World Where I Belong)
- 2018 The White Ravens (Marius, Magic, and Lisa the Werewolf)
- 2018 IBBY Honour List (How My Dad Got a New Wife)

== Translations ==
Korean

- 잠 못 드는 수지를 위하여, Interpark Co. Ltd. 2018
