= Dollarid =

1929 film

- Directed by: Mihkel Lepper
- Written by: Konstantin Märska
- Starring: Sisi Pinna; W. Wistinghausen; E. Garray; Mihkel Lepper; Paul Pinna; Betty Kuuskmann; Hartius Möller; Berta Männik; J. Krull
- Cinematography: Konstantin Märska
- Distributed by: Konstantin Märska Filmproduktsioon
- Release date: April 23, 1929
- Country: Estonia
- Language: Estonian

Dollarid (English: Dollars) is an Estonian feature film made in 1929. It was directed by Mihkel Lepper, and the screenplay was written by Konstantin Märska. The sets were designed by Elmar Jaanimägi. The film is considered lost.

== Plot ==
Evi Koit, a typist from a humble background, and Gustav Mets, the son of a businessman, meet by chance on a train and fall in love. The young man's father, who is also Evi's employer, is completely against their relationship. He hopes to marry his son to a rich bride to save his bankrupt company. However, Evi then receives an unexpected inheritance, which turns the social positions of those involved upside down.

== Cast ==
- Sisi Pinna as the typist Evi Koit
- Walter von Wistinghausen as Evi's father
- E. Garray as Evi's mother
- Mihkel Lepper as the student Gustav Mets
- Paul Pinna as Gustav's father, a businessman
- Betty Kuuskmann as Gustav's mother
- Hartius Möller as a business colleague of Gustav's father
- Berta Männik as his daughter
- J. Krull as a sleeping car conductor
- Voldemar Toffer as a business traveler
- Hans Fischer as the journalist
- Salme Peetson as the first middle-aged woman
- Olga Holts as the second middle-aged woman
- Ms. Nikolsky as the third middle-aged woman
