= Jaak Juske =

Estonian journalist, historian, author, and politician (born 1976)

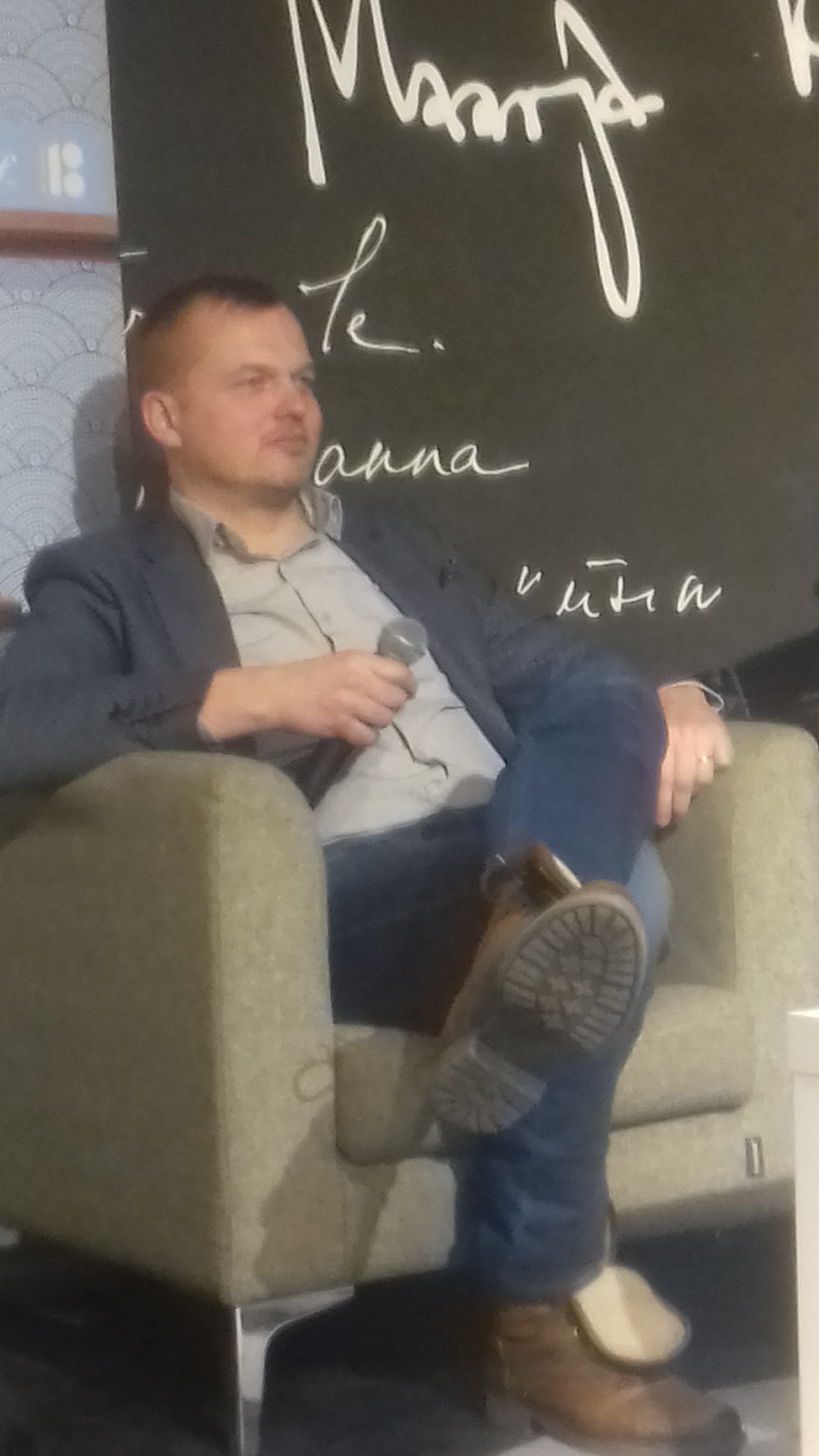
Jaak Juske (2018)

Jaak Juske (born on the 12 December 1976) is an Estonian journalist, historian, author, politician, and member of the Social Democratic Party of Estonia.

Born in Tartu, Juske is also the chairman of the eight-member Social Democratic Party wing in the City Council of Tallinn and the Vice Chairman of the party's Tallinn district. He is also the chairman of the party's Northern Tallinn section.

Since 2000, Juske has been giving lectures in a radio show called Roosiaed.

== Education ==
- 1984–1995 – Tartu Descartes Lyceum
- 1999–2003 – Visitor Student at Tartu University
- 1999–2000 – Practical work at the Estonian Evangelical Lutheran Church of Sangaste Parish
- 1995–2005 – Theology in Tartu Academy of Theology and in Estonian Evangelical Lutheran Church Institute of Theology
- From 2008 – History at Tallinn University

== Career ==
- 1994 – A journalist at the biggest public daily newspaper – Postimees
- 1997–1998 – Public Relations Officer of the People's Union of Estonia and the Right-Wing Party of Estonia
- 1999 – Election campaign leader of the party Mõõdukad in Elva
- 1999–2002 – Councillor of People's Union Party of Mõõdukad of Estonia at the City Council of Tallinn
- 2002–2003 – Councillor of Mõõdukad Party at Estonian Parliament – Riigikogu
- 2003–2004 – NATO Association project leader
- 2004–2005 – Public Relations Officer of the Social-Democratic Party of Estonia and election campaign leader
- 2005–2009 – Councillor of the Social-Democratic Party at the City Council of Tallinn
- 2009 – Election campaign leader of the Social-Democratic Party in Tallinn
- 2004–2010 – Chairman of the Social-Democratic Party’s Tallinn district
- 2009-2013 – Chairman of the Social-Democratic wing at the City Council of Tallinn; Chairman of the Commission of the City Property; member of the Justice Commission and Monetary Commission
- 2009-2013 – Vice Chairman of the administrative board of Northern Tallinn and Chairman of the Entrepreneurship Commission of Northern Tallinn
- 2009-2011 – AS Tallinn Industrial Parks Council member
- 2010–2013 - Vice Chairman of the City Council of Tallinn; Chairman of the Social-Democratic wing
- From 2009 - Member of the Tallinn City Council

== Political activities ==
=== Member of political parties ===
- 1997–1999 – The Right-Wing Party of Estonia (from 1998 People's Union Party)
- From 1999 – The Social Democratic Party of Estonia (up until 2004 People's Union Party of Moderate)

=== Activities in the City Council of Tallinn ===
Juske is one of the members of the Coalition Council of Tallinn, representing the Social Democratic Party of Estonia. As being the Vice Chairman of the City Council of Tallinn, he has also stood for the resilience financing of kindergartens in Tallinn.

== Public activities ==
Since 2000, Juske has been a member of Estonian Students' Society. He is also a co-publisher of the book Viisaastak õpilasmalevas.

== Personal life ==
Jaak Juske is married to Kristi Juske. He has three children. His father, Ants Juske, is an art scientist and his mother, Mare Väli, is a psychologist.
