= Raadi, Tartu County =

Borough in Estonia

Raadi
- Borough
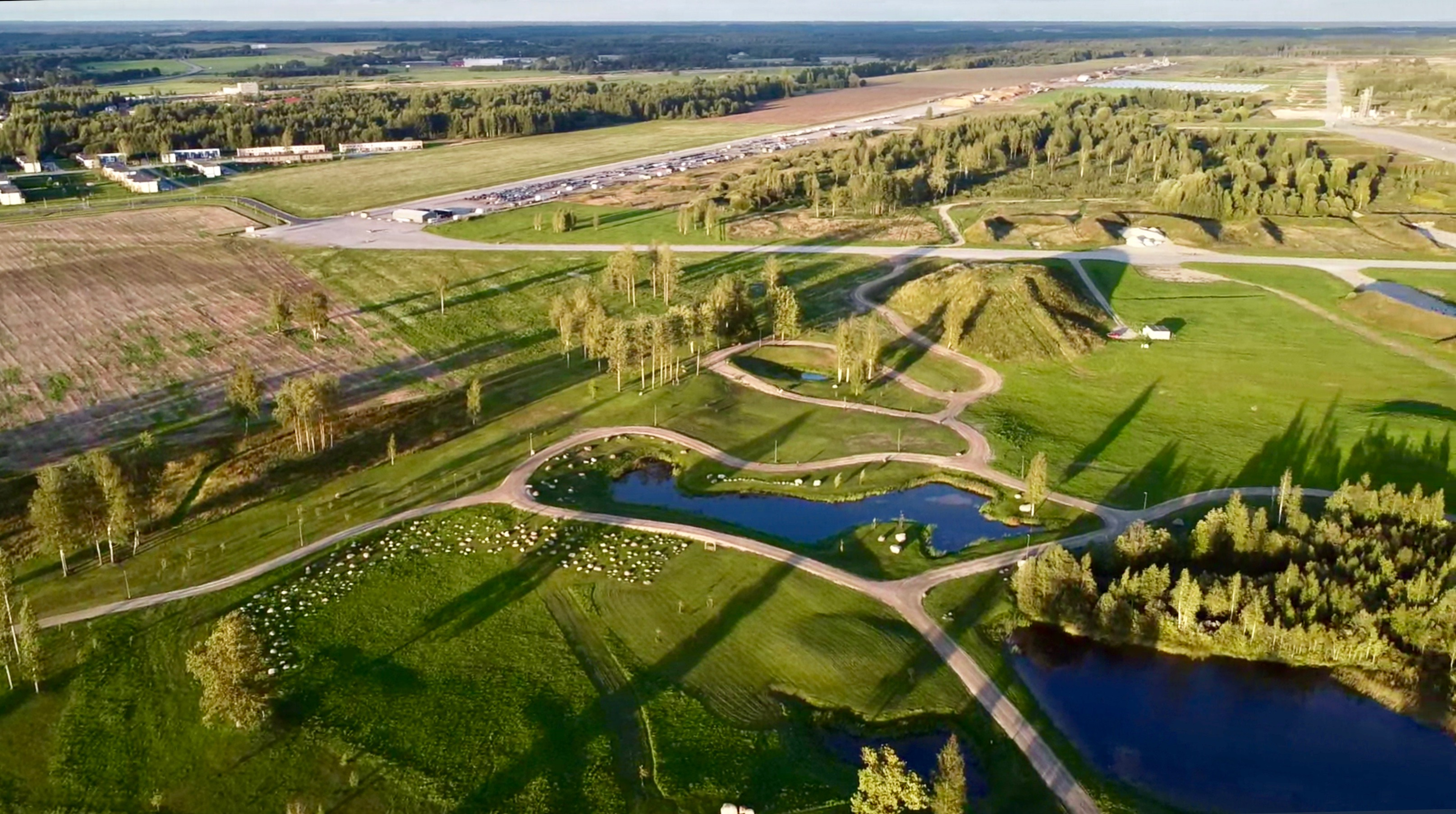
- Majoraadi park, Autumn 2021

- Location in Estonia
- Coordinates: 58°24′14″N 26°44′56″E
- Country: Estonia
- County: Tartu County
- Municipality: Tartu Parish

Raadi is a borough (Estonian: alev) in Tartu Parish, Tartu County.

The borough was established on 4 July 2022 when parts of Vahi small borough and Tila village was merged into the new settlement unit: Raadi borough.

The borough has a population of 3000 (as of 2022).

The eastern part of the settlement is covered by Raadi Airfield, a former Soviet air base.

== See also ==
- Raadi-Kruusamäe, or Raadi for short, neighbourhood of Tartu bordering Raadi in south.
- Raadi Manor
- Lake Raadi
