= Euroacademy =

University in Tallinn, Estonia

Coordinates: 59°25′41″N 24°42′8″E

Euroacademy (Estonian: Euroakadeemia) was a private university in Tallinn, Estonia, established in 1997 (29 years ago).

From 1997 to 2009 it used the name Euro University (Estonian: Euroülikool). In 2019 (7 years ago), it was shut down due to financial issues, as of 31 August 2020.

== See also ==
- List of universities in Estonia
