= Hartius Möller =

Estonian actor (1885–1942)

- Born: January 22, 1885; Tõrma, Estonia
- Died: February 19, 1942 (aged 57); Ukhtizhemlag, Komi ASSR, USSR
- Occupation: Actor

Hartius Gerhard Abraham Möller (January 22, 1885 – February 19, 1942) was an Estonian actor.

== Early life and education ==
Hartius Möller was born at the Hellemäe farm in Tõrma, Estonia, the son of Hans Möller (1850–1920) and Leena Möller (née Lagrum, 1849–1894). He attended Rakvere City School, the Saint Petersburg Art School, and the Stieglitz Art School.

== Career ==
After graduating, Möller acted in the Vanemuine theater troupe directed by Karl Menning. On July 23, 1910, at the Hellemäe farm, Möller married the Vanemuine actress Elviine Annuk (1890–1974), whose later acting name was Mari Möldre; they later divorced. During the First World War, Möller worked in Finland as a military supplier. Later he acted in Estonia and directed provincial theaters, including the Saaremaa Summer Theater. He was primarily known as a comedy actor.

Möller appeared in the 1925 film Esimese öö õigus and the 1929 film Dollarid. In his otherwise negative review of Dollarid, Karl August Hindrey nevertheless had a positive opinion of the actors.

On November 22, 1940, during the first Soviet occupation of Estonia, Möller was arrested by the NKVD in Tallinn and deported, accused of anti-Soviet propaganda under Section 13 of Article 58. He was sentenced to 10 years in a correctional labor camp. He arrived from Tallinn prison at the Ukhtizhemlag prison camp on May 22, 1941. He was also accused of being a member of the Defense League and suppressing the 1924 Estonian coup attempt. He died on February 19, 1942.

== Filmography ==
- 1925: Esimese öö õigus as Uno von Sternhell, a knight
- 1929: Dollarid as a business colleague of Gustav's father
