= Tsitre =

Village in Estonia

Coordinates: 59°31′N 25°31′E

- Village
- Interactive map of Tsitre
- Country: Estonia
- County: Harju County
- Parish: Kuusalu Parish
- Time zone: UTC+2 (EET)
  - Summer (DST): UTC+3 (EEST)

Tsitre (German: Zitter) is a village in Kuusalu Parish, Harju County in northern Estonia, on the territory of Lahemaa National Park.

== Notable people ==
Notable people that were born or lived in Tsitre include the following:

- Walter von Wistinghausen (1879–1956), Estonian–German actor, journalist, translator, and writer

== Gallery ==
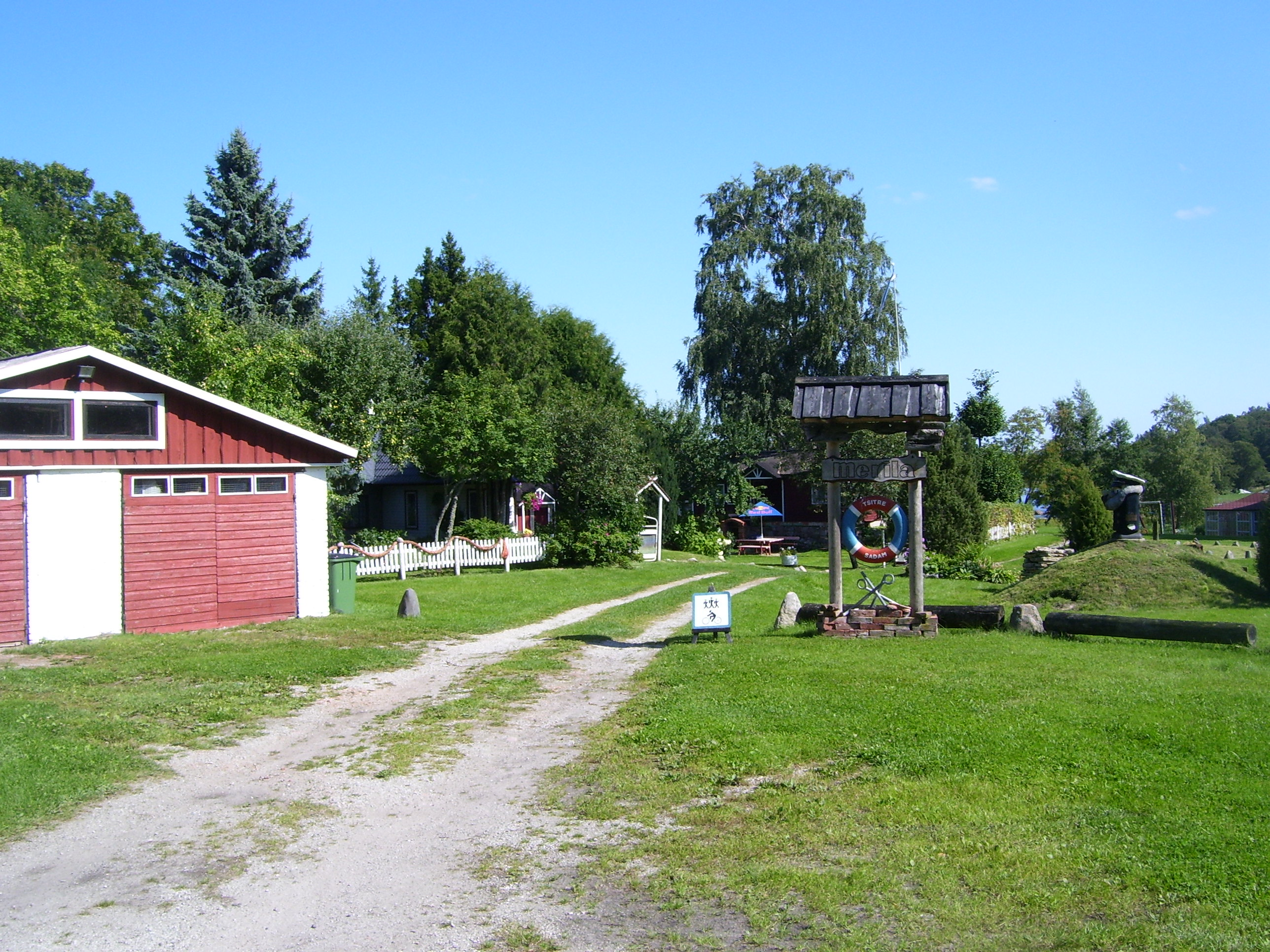

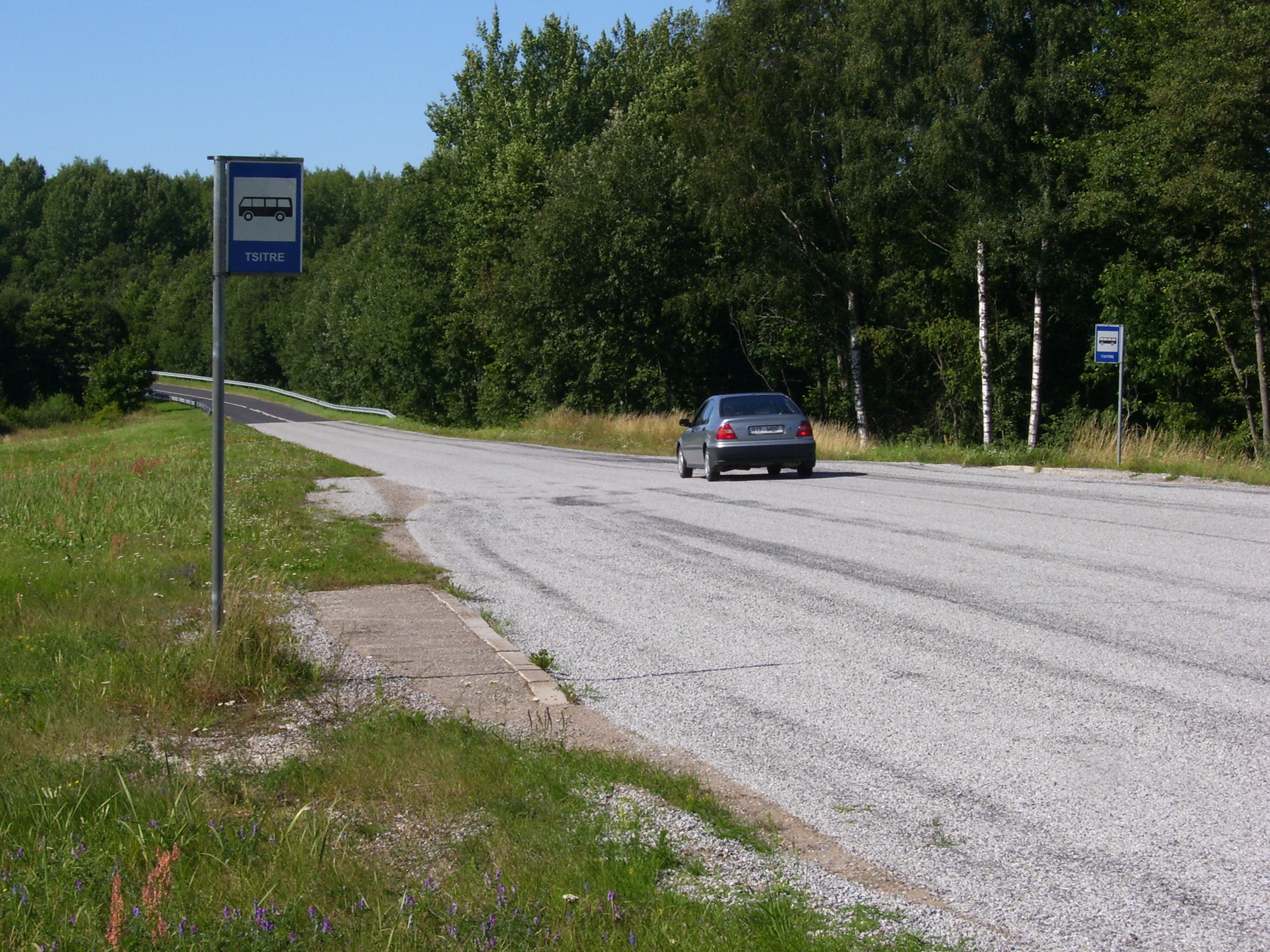
Tsitre bus stop

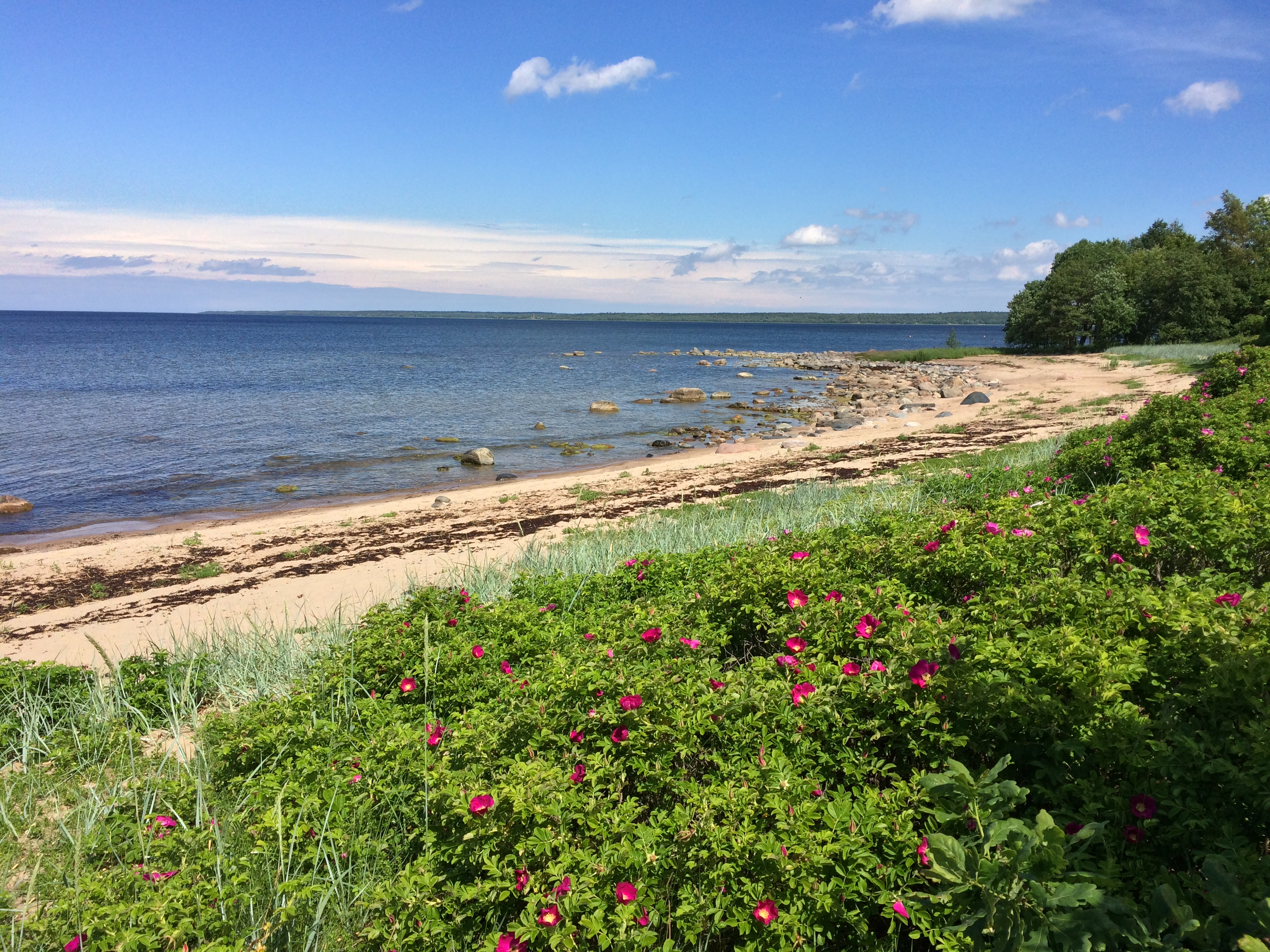
Tsitre beach

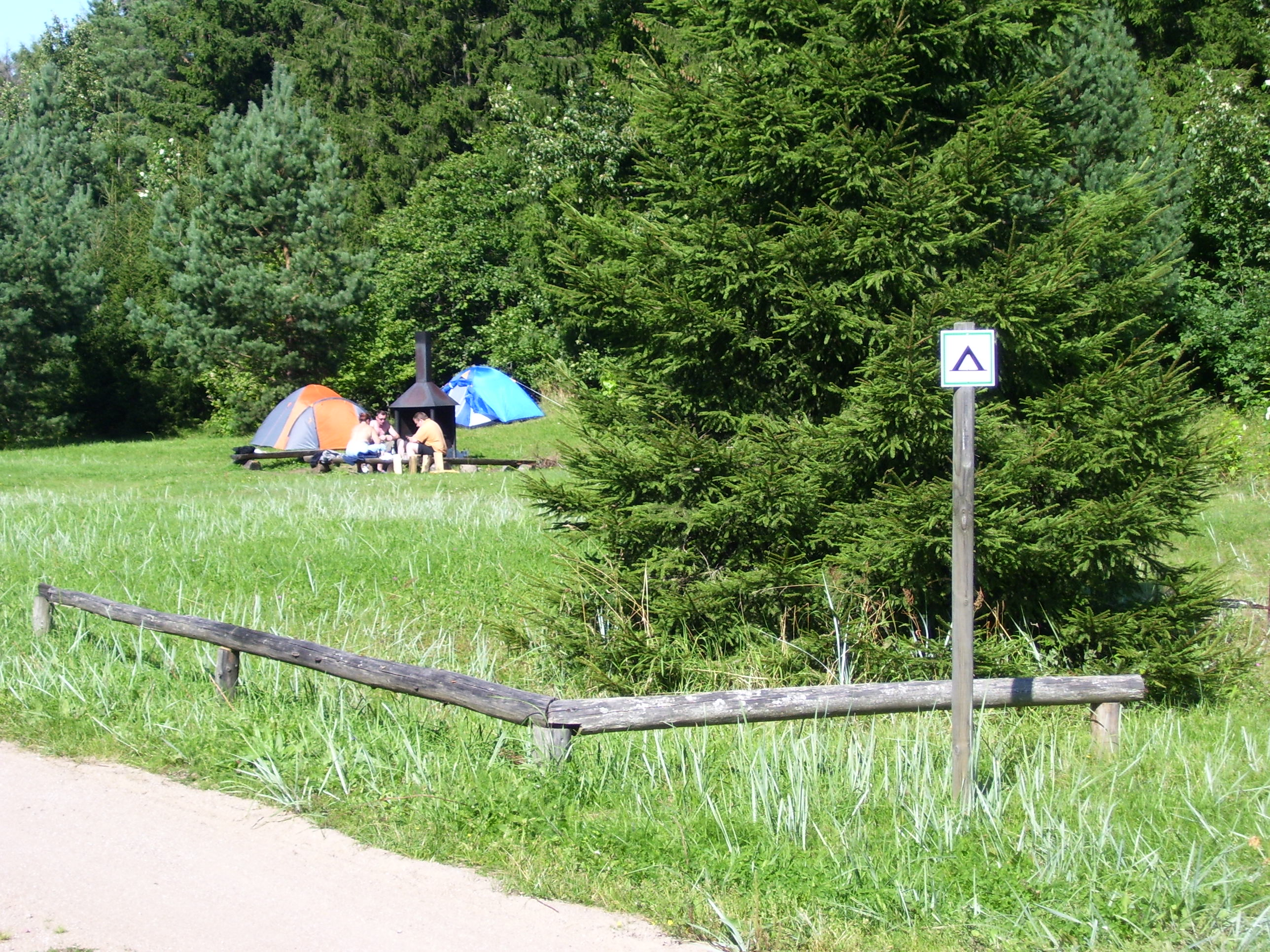
Camping site
