= Tila, Estonia =

Village in Estonia

- Village
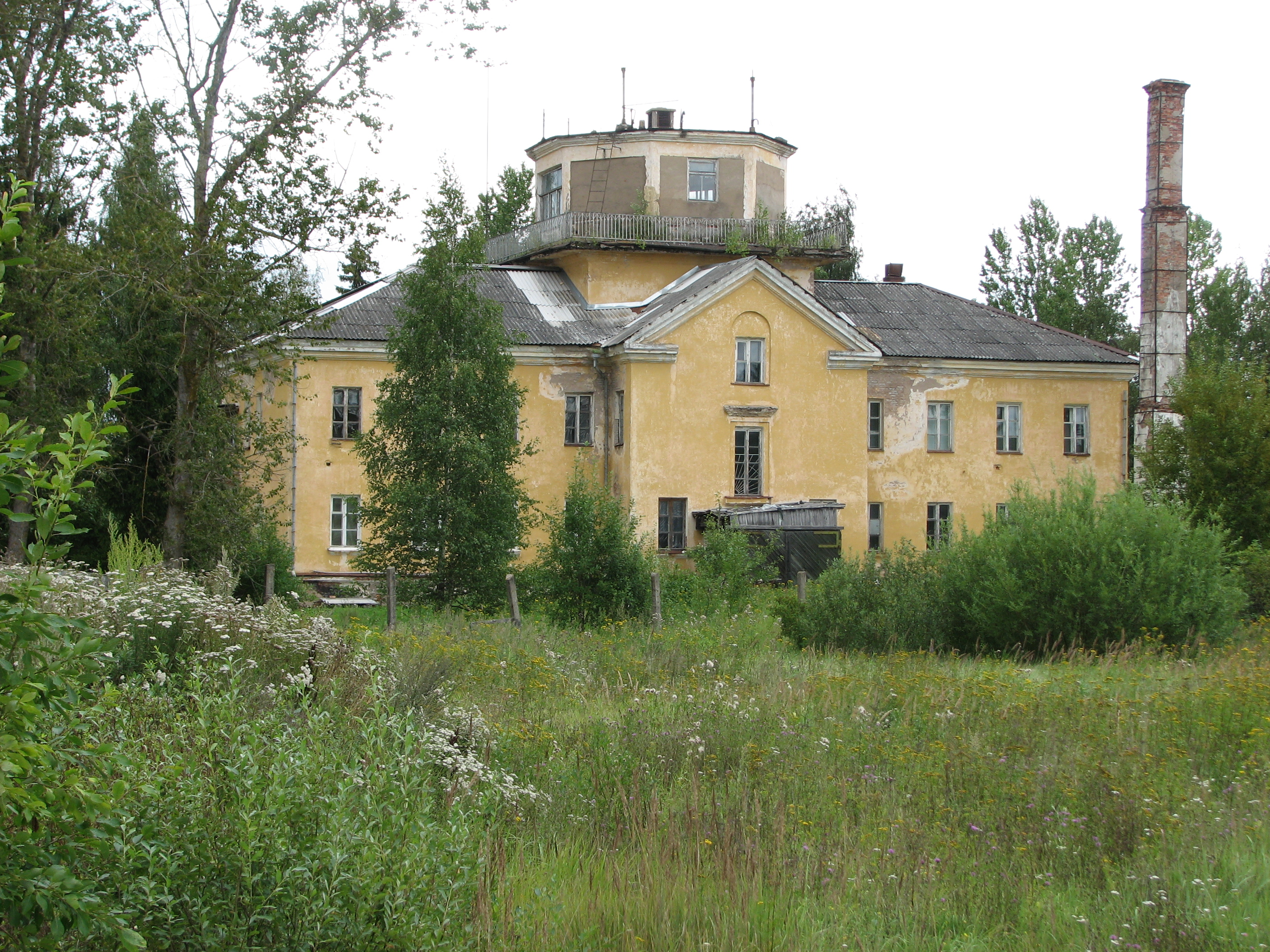
- Military airport of USSR in Raadi, Tartu, Estonia, c.2008

- Location within Estonia
- Coordinates: 58.4184°N 26.7835°E
- Country: Estonia
- County: Tartu County
- Parish: Tartu Parish
- Time zone: UTC+2 (EET)
  - Summer (DST): UTC+3 (EEST)

Tila is a village in Tartu Parish, Tartu County in Estonia.

On 4 July 2022, parts of Tila village and Vahi were merged into a new settlement unit Raadi borough.
