= Betty Kuuskemaa =

Estonian actress (1879–1966)

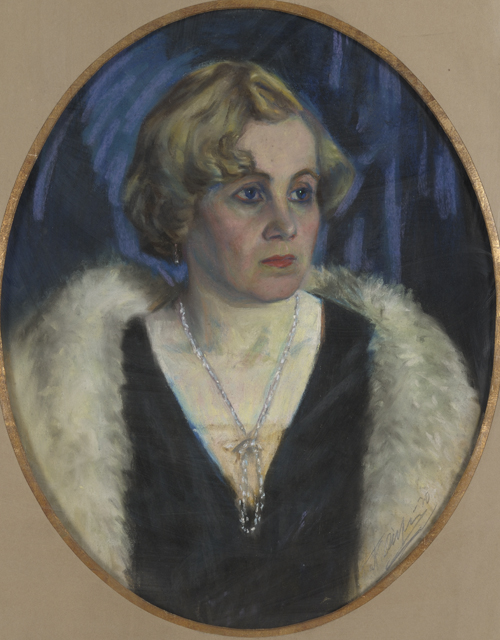
- Portrait of Betty Kuuskemaa by Ants Laikmaa c. 1930
- Born: Marie-Elisabeth Jõggis; 28 January 1879; Haggers, Kreis Harrien, Governorate of Estonia, Russian Empire
- Died: 19 December 1966 (aged 87); Tallinn, then part of Estonian SSR, Soviet Union
- Other names: Betty Jõggis; Betty Ohakas
- Occupation: Actress
- Years active: 1894–1966
- Spouse: August Mart Kuuskemaa
- Children: Ado Kuuskemaa (1914–1914); Madis Kuuskemaa (1920–1944)
- Relatives: Jüri Kuuskemaa (grandson)

Marie-Elisabeth "Betty" Kuuskemaa (born Marie-Elisabeth Jõggis, until 1935 Betty Kuuskmann; 28 January 1879 – 19 December 1966) was an Estonian stage and film actress whose long career spanned over sixty years.

== Early life and education ==
Betty Kuuskemaa was born Marie-Elisabeth Jõggis in Hageri in Rapla County to storekeeper Andres Jõggis and Wilhelmine Jõggis (née Sööt), who was a seamstress. She was the fourth-born child of six siblings. Her three older siblings were Voldemar, born in 1872; Ludwig, born in 1875; and Alma Sophie, born in 1877. Her two younger sisters were Wilhelmine, born in 1880; and Emilie, born in 1882.

She graduated secondary school in 1894 from the now defunct Tallinn Niclasen German Girls' School before traveling and studying abroad in Paris, Berlin, Vienna and London. Beginning in 1897, she sang with the Estonia Song and Drama Society choir. From 1899 until 1901, she also worked as a florist.

== Stage career ==
In 1898 Kuuskemaa began performing as a stage actress with the song and drama society called Estonia, founded in 1865. In 1906, the society became the basis for the professional theatre called Estonia, founded by the directors and actors Paul Pinna and Theodor Altermann. In 1913, the Estonia Theatre was built as a national effort under the leadership of the Estonia society and Kuuskemaa was among the original troupe of actors to appear onstage at the theatre following its opening.

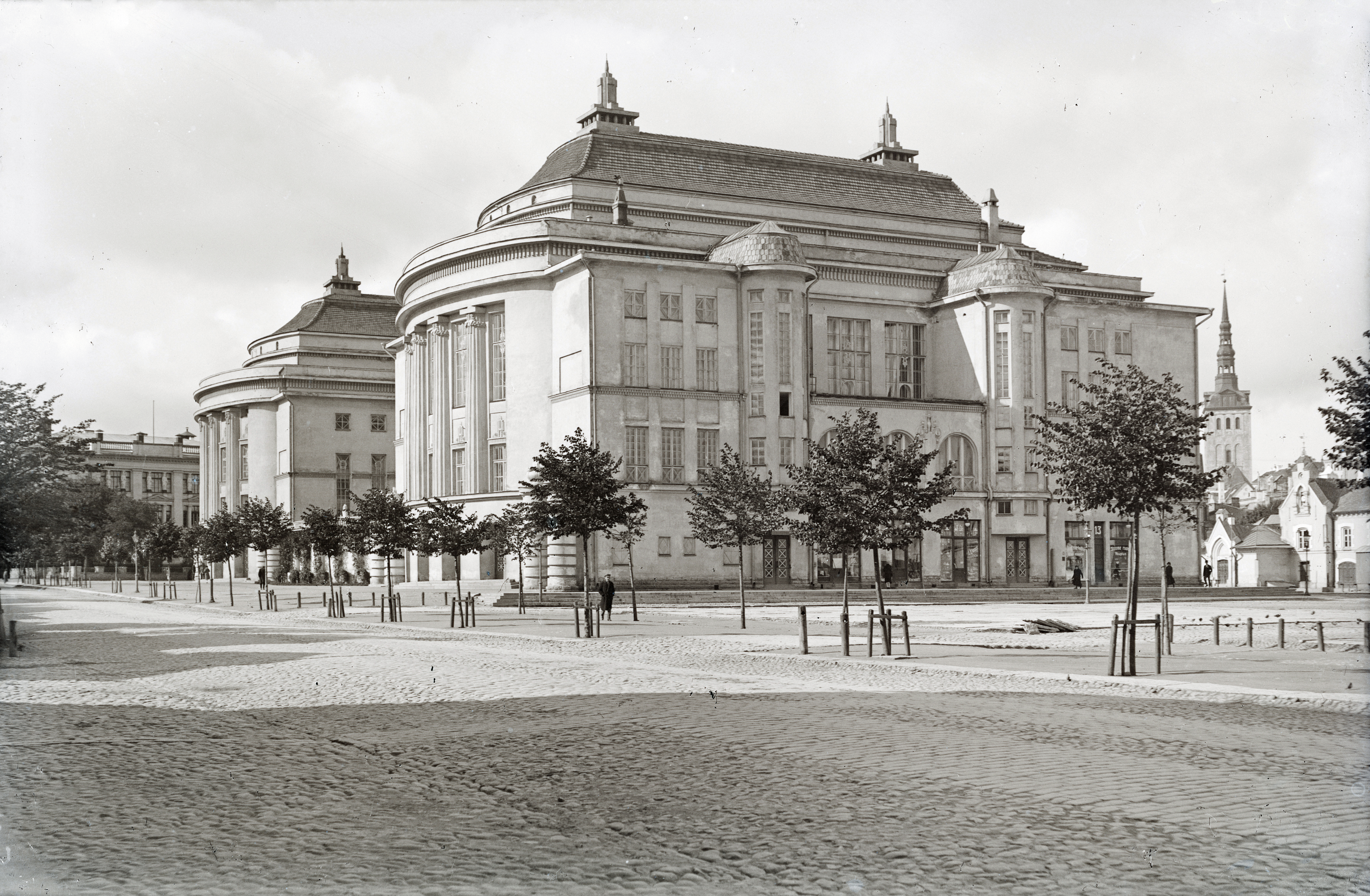
The Estonia Theatre in Tallinn, where Kuuskemaa was engaged as an actress for nearly fifty years.

Kuuskemaa would have a prolific career at the Estonia Theatre, lasting nearly fifty years. She would perform with the Estonia Society until 1949 (with some intermissions) when the drama troupe was eventually disbanded. Kuuskemaa performed in both dramatic and comedic roles as well as operettas. Her first performance with the Estonia Society was the role of Tiina in a production of Wilhelm Mannstädt's The Milk Maid of Schöneberg; adapted into Estonian as Ilumäe piimatüdruk ("The Milk Maid of Ilumäe") in 1898. Notable roles throughout her career at the Estonia Theatre include those in productions of such varied authors and playwrights as: Shakespeare, Richard Voss, Minna Canth, Hermann Sudermann, Teuvo Pakkala, Henrik Ibsen, Maxim Gorky, Carl Zeller, Anton Chekhov, Henryk Sienkiewicz, Leo Tolstoy, August Kitzberg, Hugo Raudsepp, Eugene O'Neill, Eduard Vilde and August Jakobson.

Following the Soviet annexation of Estonia in 1944, Kuuskemaa fled to Sweden. The Estonia Theatre building, which housed the Estonia song and drama society theatre and the Estonian National Opera was bombed and heavily damaged by Soviet air raids on 9 March 1944. Kuuskemaa remained in Sweden until 1946, when she was repatriated to the Estonian Soviet Socialist Republic. In 1947, she resumed her career with the Estonia song and drama society when the Estonia Theatre building was reopened. She remained there until its dissolution in 1949.

== Film career ==
Betty Kuuskemaa made her screen debut in the 1913 film Laenatud naene (The Borrowed Wife). In 1947 she appeared in the Soviet Estonian-language drama Elu tsitadellis (Life in the Citadel) directed by Herbert Rappaport for Lenfilm, based on the 1946 play of the same name by the Estonian author and communist politician August Jakobson. Elu tsitadellis was the first post-World War II Estonian feature film following the annexation of Estonia into the Soviet Union. The plot largely revolves around the arrival of the Soviet Army following the German occupation of Estonia in 1944 and justice being meted out to Estonians who had collaborated with German occupying forces. The film ends with jubilant Estonians celebrating their "liberation" and inclusion into the Soviet Union and accepting communist ideology.

Ten years passed before Betty Kuuskemaa appeared in another film. In 1957, she appeared in the Aleksandr Mandrõkin directed drama Pöördel (The Turning Point) for Tallinnfilm. Pöördel stars actors Gunnar Kilgas as the new chairman of a failing Estonian collective farm and his struggle win the trust of the farm workers and boost the farm's production.

In 1961, she appeared in the role of Mari in the Egon Rannet penned and Ilja Fogelman and Reet Kasesalu directed color musical comedy film Laulu sõber (Friend of Songs), again set against the backdrop of a collective farm.

== Personal life ==
Betty Jõggis was married August Mart Kuuskemaa, who died in 1955. She did not remarry. The couple had two sons. Their firstborn, Ado Kuuskemaa died soon after his birth in 1914. In 1920, Betty Kuuskemaa gave birth to Madis Kuuskemaa, who died in 1944 at the Battle of Narva as an Estonian volunteer for the German Army with the rank of Oberfähnrich; he was age 23 at the time of his death; a month shy of his 24th birthday. Madis had a son in 1942, Jüri Kuuskemaa, who is a prominent Estonian art historian.

Betty Kuuskemaa died on 19 December 1966, at age 87 in Tallinn and was buried in Tallinn's Forest Cemetery.

== Acknowledgements ==
In 1924, Kuuskemaa sat for a portrait painting by Anna Luik-Püüman. The painting now belongs to the Estonian Theatre and Music Museum.

In 1936, Betty Kuuskemaa received the Honoured Actress and Estonian Actors Union gold merit badge for her accomplishments as an actress. In 1947, she was named a Merited Artist of the Estonian SSR. In 1980, a 100 x 50 centimeter bronze memorial plaque was placed on her former residence at J. Poska St. 10 in Tallinn which reads, "Here lived in the years 1953–1966 Estonian SSR Honoured artist Betty Kuuskemaa." The plaque was stolen in 2003, but later replaced.
