= Walter von Wistinghausen =

Estonian–German actor and writer (1879–1956)

- Born: June 19, 1879; Tsitre, Governorate of Estonia, Russian Empire
- Died: February 26, 1956 (aged 76); Ludwigsburg, West Germany
- Occupations: Actor, journalist, translator, and writer
- Father: Karl Alexander von Wistinghausen

Walter Siegfried Nikolai von Wistinghausen (stage name Willibald Wickel, June 19, 1879 – February 26, 1956) was an Estonian–German actor, journalist, translator, and writer.

== Early life and education ==
Walter von Wistinghausen came from the Baltic noble family von Wistinghausen, which had been based in Tallinn since the mid-17th century. Walter von Wistinghausen was born at Tsitre Manor in Estonia, the son of the chamberlain and medical doctor Karl Alexander von Wistinghausen (1826–1883) and his second wife, Adelheid Anna Nicolette Theophile Gräfin von Stenbock (1849–1922). The family lived in Tallinn until the father's death in 1883. From 1883 to 1885 they lived in Kolga, and in 1885 the mother and her four children moved to Tartu. Walter von Wistinghausen attended Friedrich Kollmann Classical Private High School (German: Kollmann'sche Privatgymnasium) in Tartu from 1886 to 1890 and received private lessons from 1890 to 1892. In 1893 he enrolled at Lajus High School (German: Lajussche Schule) in Tallinn, from 1896 to 1897 he attended Nicholas High School (German: Gymnasium des Kaisers Nikolai I.), and then he attended Catherine School (German: Katharinenschule) in Saint Petersburg.

== Career ==
From 1898 to 1900 he farmed the Vääna estate of the Baron von Stackelberg family. From 1900 to 1901 he was the manager of the Gurbatov estate in the Ryazan Governorate, south of Moscow, and starting in 1902 he took part in training in the production of dairy products in East Prussia. Between 1907 and 1917 he held various administrative posts; from 1911 to 1912 he was a member of the staff of the government of the Governorate of Estonia, in 1912 an inspector for a Russian insurance company, and from 1913 to 1917 an official for the Estonian Knighthood. Starting in 1907 he worked for the Estonian governor in press affairs and censorship.

His artistic career began in 1907 under the stage name Willibald Wickel in the Drama Society in Tallinn, where he had been a board member since 1913. He appeared as an amateur actor in numerous, mainly comic, roles and performances. During this time he translated Eduard Vilde's comedy Pisuhänd (1913), which was published under the German title Der Schratt. With students of the Tallinn Cathedral School and young ladies of the Reval Society, he staged several plays, despite the official ban on German-language productions. In 1929 he appeared in the Estonian silent film Dollarid, directed by Mihkel Lepper. From 1924 to 1939 he was the theater columnist for the newspaper Revalsche Zeitung, in which he published more than 700 articles on theater, film, and ballet. As a result of the resettlement of the Baltic German population, he relocated to Germany in November 1939. From 1940 to 1943 he was employed as an examiner at the Inspection Office for Foreign Mail in Berlin. In 1943 he was transferred to Estonia, where he was a censor in the German civil administration for the Estonian and Russian press in Tallinn and Tartu, and an editor for the Estonian press and literature at the press office of Reichskommissariat Ostland in Riga. From 1943 to 1944 he worked in the censorship department run by the German occupation forces. At the end of March 1944, he managed to escape to Germany.

== Filmography ==
- 1929: Dollarid as Evi's father

== Works ==
During the Second World War, Wistinghausen translated two or three volumes of a collection about the first year of Russian occupation of Estonia, Eesti rahva kannatuste (The Sufferings of the Estonian People), but the translation was apparently not published. Together with Fred Ottow, he also translated the 1942 novel Hea sadam (The Good Harbor) by the Estonian writer August Mälk, which was published in Berlin in 1947. His memoirs were originally intended to comprise 13 chapters, of which the first chapter, "Aus meiner näheren Umwelt" (From My Immediate Environment), has been preserved. Other works include:

- 1951: Ein Schock Rätsel in Versen (A Shocking Riddle in Verse). Ludwigsburg: author
- 1960: Verwalter Pirk sein Hausboesie: gereimtes Allerlei in estländischem Halbdeutsch (Manager Pirk's Homemade Poetry: Rhymed Miscellany in Estonian Half-German) Hanover-Döhren: H. von Hirschheydt
- 1960: Das Gespenst von Pokrowskoje und andere Erzählungen (The Ghost of Pokrovskoye and Other Stories; volume 3 in Die baltische Bücherei). Hanover-Döhren: H. von Hirschheydt

== Family ==
Walter von Wistinghausen married Isolde von Ungern-Sternberg (1882–1910) in 1903. His son Rudolf von Wistinghausen (1905–1981) was the German ambassador to Togo, and his grandson Henning von Wistinghausen (born 1936) was the first ambassador of Germany to Estonia, from 1991 to 1995.
