= Kolga =

Borough in Estonia

- Small borough
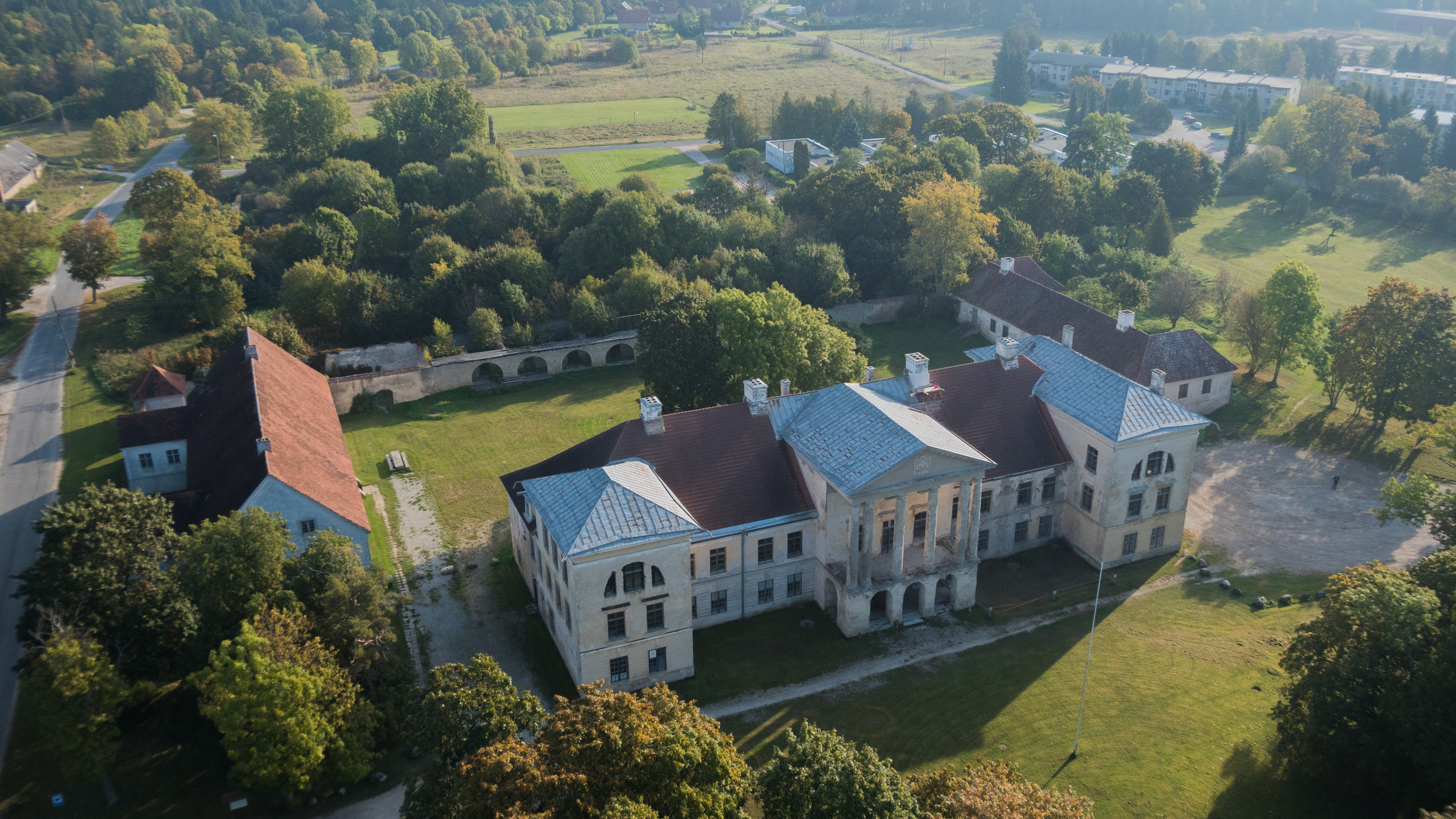
- Kolga Manor

- Location in Estonia
- Coordinates: 59°29′33″N 25°36′45″E
- Country: Estonia
- County: Harju County
- Municipality: Kuusalu Parish

Population (01.01.2010)
  - Total: 490

Kolga (German: Kolk) is a small borough (Estonian: alevik) in Kuusalu Parish, Harju County, in northern Estonia, on the territory of Lahemaa National Park. It has a population of 490 (as of 1 January 2010).

Kolga is best known for its classicist manor.

== Notable people ==
Notable people that were born or lived in Kolga include the following:

- Aleksander Aberg (1881–1920), wrestler, born at Kolga Manor
- Walter von Wistinghausen (1879–1956), Estonian–German actor, journalist, translator, and writer, lived in Kolga from 1883 to 1885
