= Tartu (disambiguation) =

Tartu is the second largest city in Estonia.

Tartu may also refer to:

== Places ==
- Tartu (urban municipality), an urban municipality containing the city and an adjacent rural area
- Tartu County, in which the city is located
- Tartu Parish, a rural municipality in Tartu County neighbouring the city
- 35618 Tartu, an asteroid

== Historical events ==
- Siege of Tartu (1224), part of the Christian conquest of Estonia
- Treaty of Tartu (Russian–Estonian), a February 1920 peace treaty between the Russian Soviet Federated Socialist Republic and newly independent Estonia
- Treaty of Tartu (Russian–Finnish), an October 1920 peace treaty between the Russian Soviet Federated Socialist Republic and newly independent Finland
- Battle of Tartu (1941), a World War II battle for the city
- Tartu Offensive (1944), a World War II offensive

== Military ==
- Tartu Air Base or Raadi Airfield, a former air base northeast of the city of Tartu
- Jean-François Tartu (1751–1793), French naval officer
- French frigate Uranie (1788), renamed Tartu in honour of Jean-François Tartu
- French destroyer Tartu (1931), a destroyer named in honour of Jean-François Tartu
- French destroyer Tartu (D636), a T 53-class destroyer named in honour of Jean-François Tartu

== Schools in Tartu, Estonia ==
- University of Tartu, the largest university in Estonia
- Tartu Academy of Theology, a private university
- Estonian Aviation Academy, a public university known as Tartu Aviation College before 1996
- Tartu Art College, an upper secondary vocational art school

== Other uses ==
- Tartu College, a student residence in Toronto, Canada
- Tartu Cathedral, Tartu, Estonia
- Tartu Observatory, the largest astronomical observatory in Estonia
- Tartu Ülikool Korvpallimeeskond, an Estonian professional basketball club based in Tartu
- The Adventures of Tartu, a Second World War spy film reissued in the US under the title Tartu
- Tartu, a variety of the South Estonian language
