= Esimese öö õigus =

1929 film

- Directed by: Balduin Kusbock
- Written by: Balduin Kusbock
- Starring: Mary Melsas; René Leer; Heino Vaks; Niina Kusbock; Hartius Möller; Adalbert Kirschenberg; Carl Treumundt; Ludmilla Puhmas-Karma; Johhanes Jea
- Cinematography: J. Silis
- Distributed by: Taara-film
- Release date: October 27, 1925
- Country: Estonia
- Language: Estonian

Esimese öö õigus (Jus primae noctis) (English: Law of the First Night (Jus Primae Noctis)) is an Estonian feature film made in 1925. It was directed by Balduin Kusbock, who also wrote the screenplay. The film is considered lost.

== Plot ==
Matthias Johann Eisen's poem "Kuldja" (1923) can be considered the inspiration behind the film.

The young woman Helja Vainola is a nurse during the Estonian War of Independence. In the infirmary, she meets a wounded English lieutenant, John Smith, who has volunteered for the war. The young people fall in love, and John asks for Helja's hand in marriage, but the girl wants to finish her medical studies at the university. Returning to Estonia after a few years, John accidentally strikes an old professor while driving to Helja's farm and takes him to Helja to recover. At John's request, the professor talks about the history of the Estonians and the ancient struggle for freedom. He reads a story about this dark period of serfdom from his manuscript, which comes to life on the screen as follows.

The knight Uno von Sternhell is bored in his manor. Father Albert, the shepherd of souls, cannot think of any new amusements. To pass the time, they finally go hunting, accompanied by the Estonian page Mangu, who is desired by the knight's lady Stella von Sternhell. On the way, the knight catches sight of Linda, a serf maiden. Mangu falls in love with the beautiful maiden and asks for permission to woo her, being ready to become a serf again. The lord agrees, but he looks for a way to satisfy his unholy passion. This is delivered to him by the clergyman: let von Sternhell demand the right of the first night of the lords of the manor. The manor's servants kidnap the bride directly from the wedding party, but Mangu and the peasants catch them at the castle gate. Mangu kills von Sternhell in a duel with a sword, but the young couple do not manage to escape. They are arrested. Mangu is beaten to death in front of his bride, and Linda goes mad and vows revenge in the future.

Shocked by this story, John and Helja thank God that such brutal practices are forever a thing of the past, and they happily travel to England.

== Cast ==
- Mary Melsas as Helja Vainola, a student and farmer's daughter
- René Leer as John Smith, an English officer
- Heino Vaks as the old professor
- Niina Kusbock as Stella von Sternhell, the knight's lady
- Hartius Möller as Uno von Sternhell, the knight
- Adalbert Kirschenberg as Mangu, the knight's page
- Carl Treumundt as Father Albert, the castle's clergyman
- Ludmilla Puhmas-Karma as Linda, the daughter of a serf
- Johhanes Jea as the overseer of the manor
- Johannes Tigane
- Oskar Nuust
