= August Kirsimägi =

Estonian writer (1905–1933)

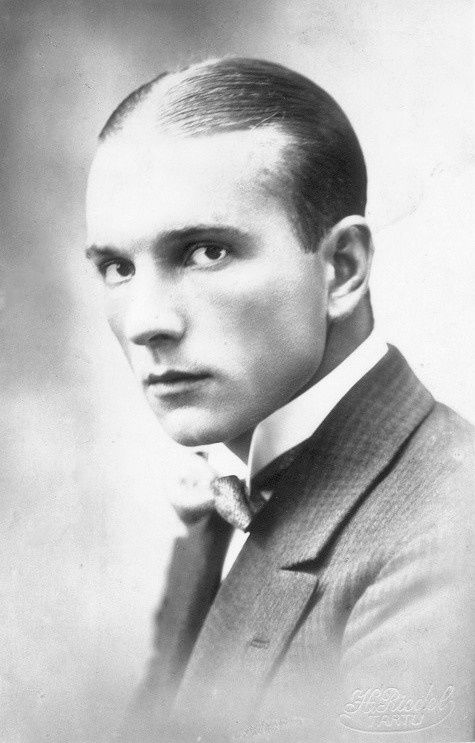
- Kirsimägi c. 1928
- Born: Adalbert August Kirschenberg; September 21, 1905; Vahi, Estonia
- Died: August 29, 1933 (aged 27); Tallinn, Estonia
- Resting place: Rahumäe Cemetery
- Occupation: Writer

August Kirsimägi (born Adalbert August Kirschenberg; September 21, 1905 – August 29, 1933 Tallinn) was an Estonian writer.

== Early life and education ==
August Kirsimägi was born Adalbert August Kirschenberg in Vahi, Estonia, the son of Juhan Kirschenberg (1870–1936) and Mari Kirschenberg (née Paas, 1872–1957). He graduated from Hugo Treffner High School in 1925. He then studied (until his death) at the University of Tartu's Faculty of Law without graduating.

== Career ==
In 1925, Kirsimägi won first prize with his abstinence-related work "Kõige parem võitlusviis alkoholi vastu Eestis" (The Best Way to Fight Alcohol in Estonia)—but he had given up abstinence before receiving the award. The fraternal organization Korporatsioon Sakala issued a blacklisting decision (Estonian: rukk) against him.

He appeared in the Estonian feature film Esimese öö õigus (1925), in which he jumped into the water from Tartu's Stone Bridge.

Kirsimägi published the first and so far the only corporatist novel in Estonian literature, Puhastustuli (Purgatory), which won first prize at the Nature Novel Competition in 1929. He also published the romantic novel Preestri tütar (The Priest's Daughter) and short stories.

== Death ==
In 1933, Kirsimägi committed suicide by gunshot after shooting and wounding Bruno Madisson (1904–1943) and his wife Ilse (née Aluhn, 1909–1991), in whom he had a love interest.

== Bibliography ==
- 1929: Puhastustuli (Purgatory). Tartu: Loodus
- 1933: Preestri tütar (The Priest's Daughter)

== Filmography ==
- 1925: Esimese öö õigus as Mangu, the knight's page
