= List of universities in Estonia =

The following is a list of universities in Estonia.

== Public comprehensive universities ==
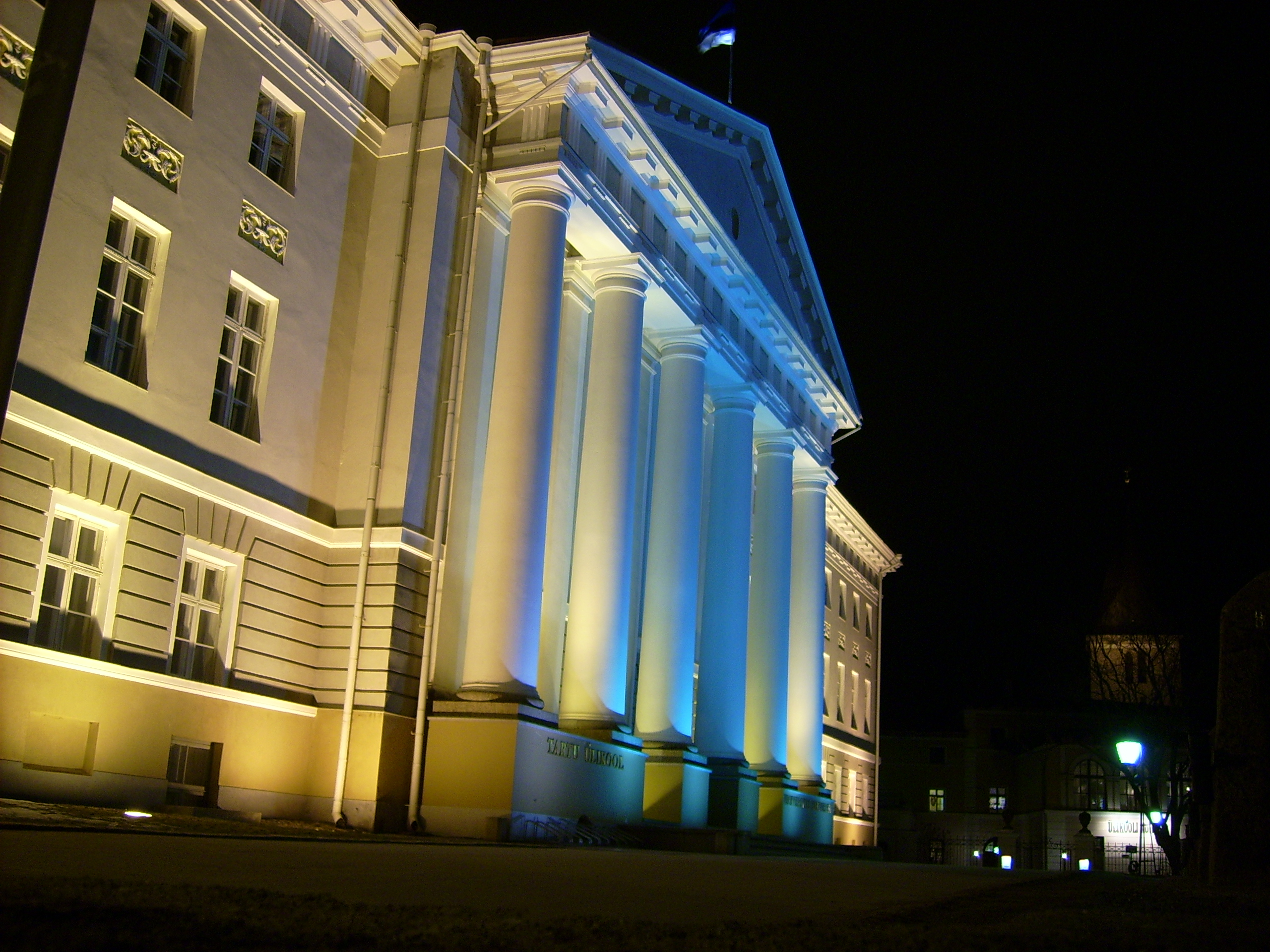
The University of Tartu is the oldest and most prestigious university in the country.

- Tallinn University (Tallinna Ülikool)
- Tallinn University of Technology (Tallinna Tehnikaülikool)
- University of Tartu (Tartu Ülikool)

== Public specialized universities ==
- Estonian Academy of Arts (Eesti Kunstiakadeemia), Tallinn
- Estonian Academy of Music and Theatre (Eesti Muusika- ja Teatriakadeemia), Tallinn
- Estonian Academy of Security Sciences (Sisekaitseakadeemia), Tallinn
- Estonian Aviation Academy (Eesti Lennuakadeemia), Tartu-Reola
- Estonian Maritime Academy (Eesti Mereakadeemia), Tallinn
- Estonian Military Academy (Kaitseväe Akadeemia), Tartu
- Estonian Public Service Academy, Tallinn
- Estonian University of Life Sciences (Eesti Maaülikool), Tartu
- Tallinn University of Applied Sciences (Tallinna Tehnikakõrgkool), Tallinn
- Pallas University of Applied Sciences (Kõrgem Kunstikool Pallas), Tartu

== Private universities ==
- Estonian Business School (EBS), Tallinn

== Multinational institutions ==
- Baltic Defence College (Balti Kaitsekolledž), Tartu

== Private institutions ==
- Estonian School of Diplomacy (Eesti Diplomaatide Kool), Tallinn
- Euroacademy (Euroakadeemia), Tallinn
- Institute of Theology (Usuteaduse Instituut), Tallinn
- Estonian Entrepreneurship University of Applied Sciences (Eesti Ettevõtluskõrgkool Mainor), Tallinn
- Tartu Academy of Theology (Tartu Teoloogia Akadeemia), Tartu

== Unsorted ==
- Tallinn School of Service
- Tallinn Health Care College

== See also ==
- Lists of universities and colleges
- Lists of universities and colleges by country
- List of schools in Estonia
