= Balduin Kusbock =

Estonian film director, actor and producer

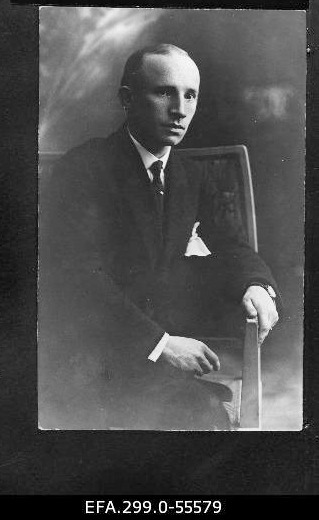
Balduin Kusbock

Balduin Kusbock (1892 – 25 January 1933 Tartu) was an Estonian film director, actor and producer; one of the Estonian film pioneers.

In 1923 he established the first film studio in Estonia (Eesti Filmi Stuudio).

== Filmography ==
- 1925 "Esimese öö õigus" (feature film; director and scenarist)
- 1930 "Pühapäevakütid" (feature film; director)
