= Vahi, Tartu County =

Small borough in Tartu County, Estonia

Vahi
- small borough (alevik)
- Location in Estonia
- Coordinates: 58°24′52″N 26°43′21″E
- Country: Estonia
- County: Tartu County
- Municipality: Tartu Parish

Population (2011)
  - Total: 1,620

Vahi is a small borough (alevik) in Tartu Parish, Tartu County in eastern Estonia. It has a population of 1,620 (as of 31 December 2011).

On 4 July 2022, parts of Vahi and the village of Tila were merged into a new settlement unit, the borough of Raadi.

== Notable people ==
Notable people that were born or lived in Vahi include the following:

- August Kirsimägi (1905–1933), writer
