= Hageri =

Borough in Estonia

- Small borough
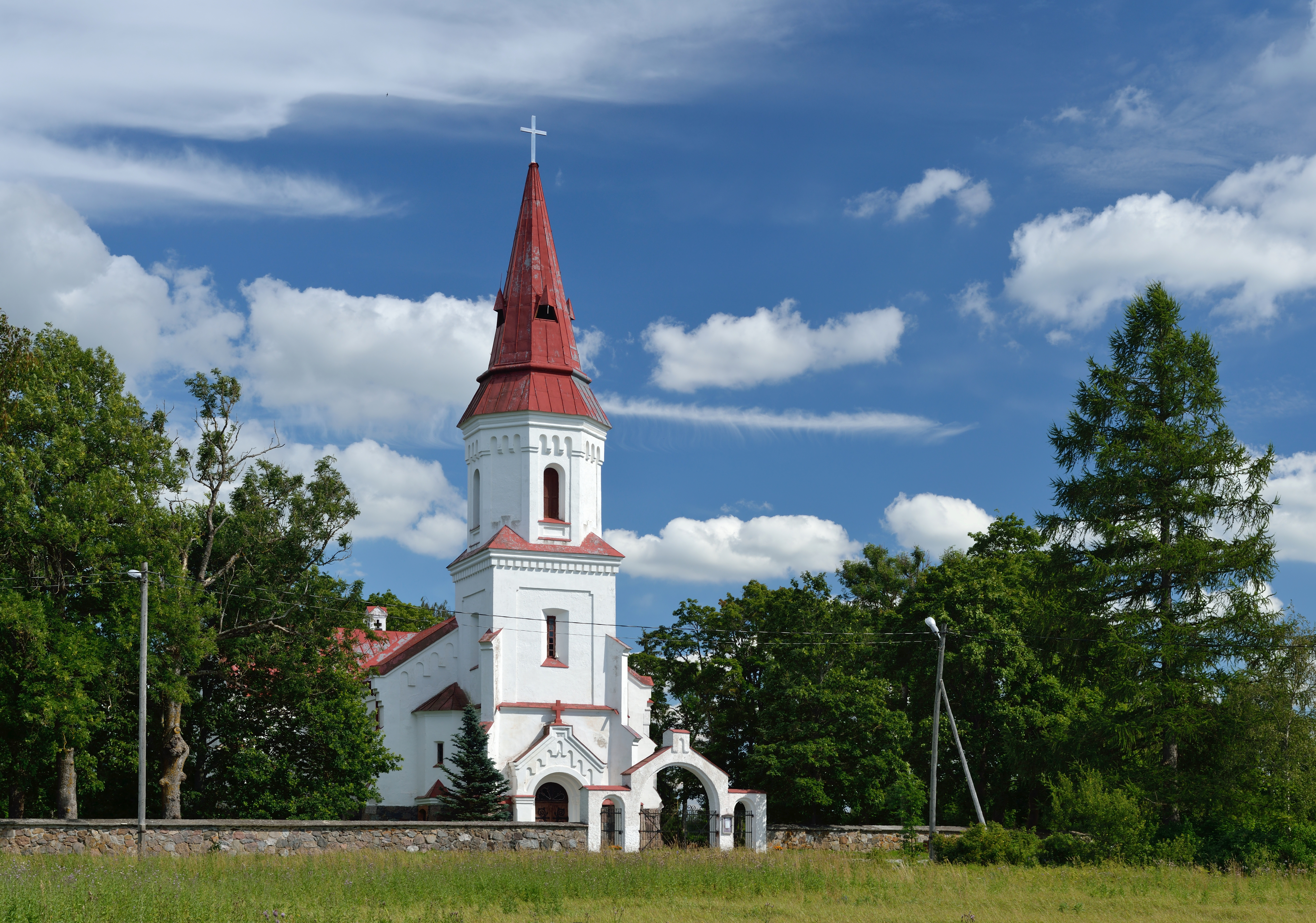
- Church in Hageri

- Location in Estonia
- Coordinates: 59°09′34″N 24°39′03″E
- Country: Estonia
- County: Rapla County
- Municipality: Kohila Parish

Government
  - Village elder: Esne Ernits

Area
  - Total: 1.05 km^{2} (0.41 sq mi)

Population (2011 census)
  - Total: 212
  - Density: 202/km^{2} (523/sq mi)

Hageri (German: Haggers) is a small borough (Estonian: alevik) in Kohila Parish, Rapla County, northern Estonia. As of the 2011 census, the settlement's population was 212. Hageri has an area of 105 ha.

== People associated with Hageri ==
- Elmar Jaanimägi (1907–1937), artist and caricaturist, buried in Hageri cemetery
- Betty Kuuskemaa (1879–1966), actress, born in Hageri
- Laine Mesikäpp (1917–2012), actress, singer, folk song collector, born in Hageri
- Aleksander Pallas (1887–1939), lawyer and politician, deputy mayor of Tallinn (1918)
- Alfred Schmidt (Ain Sillak; 1898–1972), weightlifter, born in Hageri Manor

== Images ==
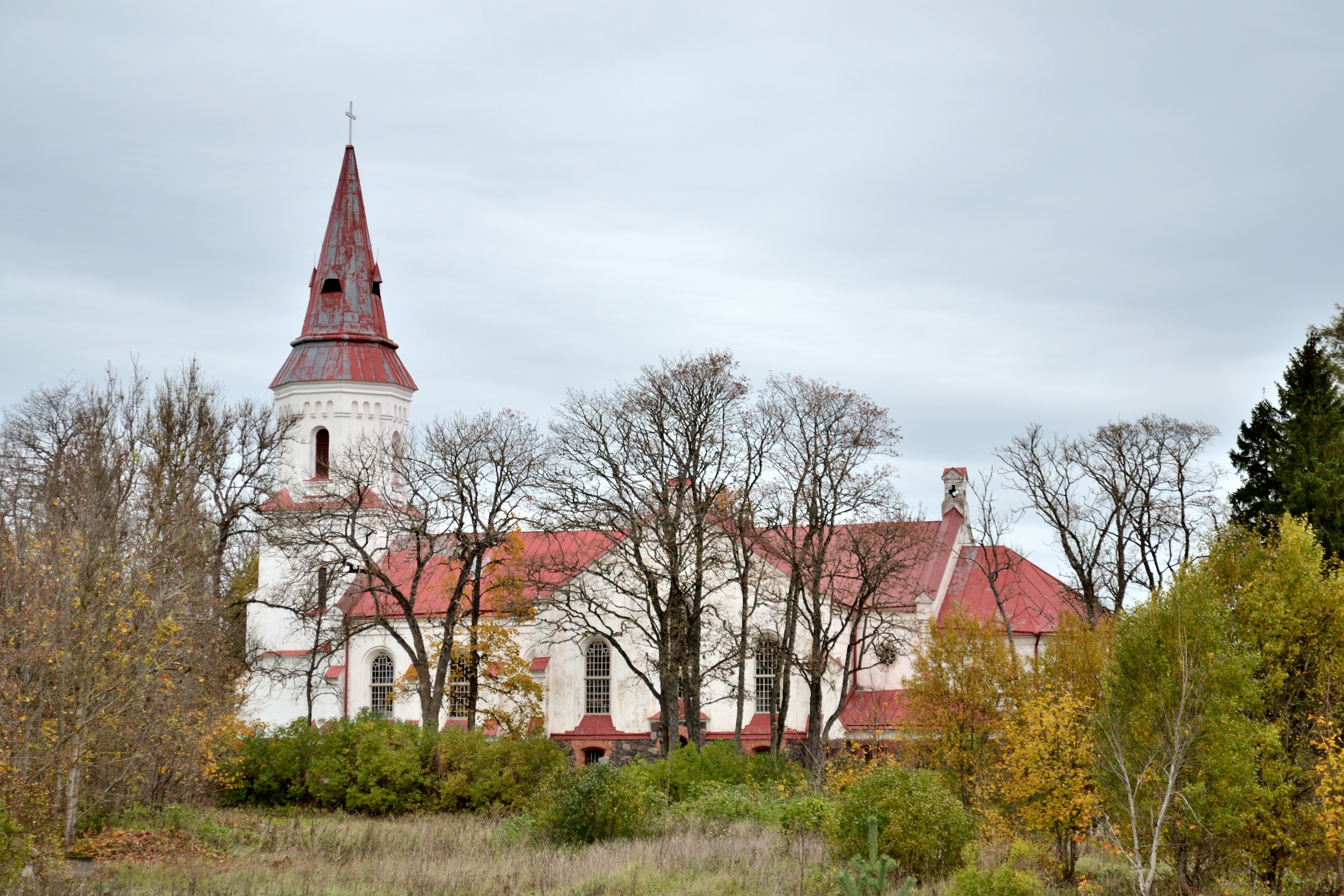
Hageri church

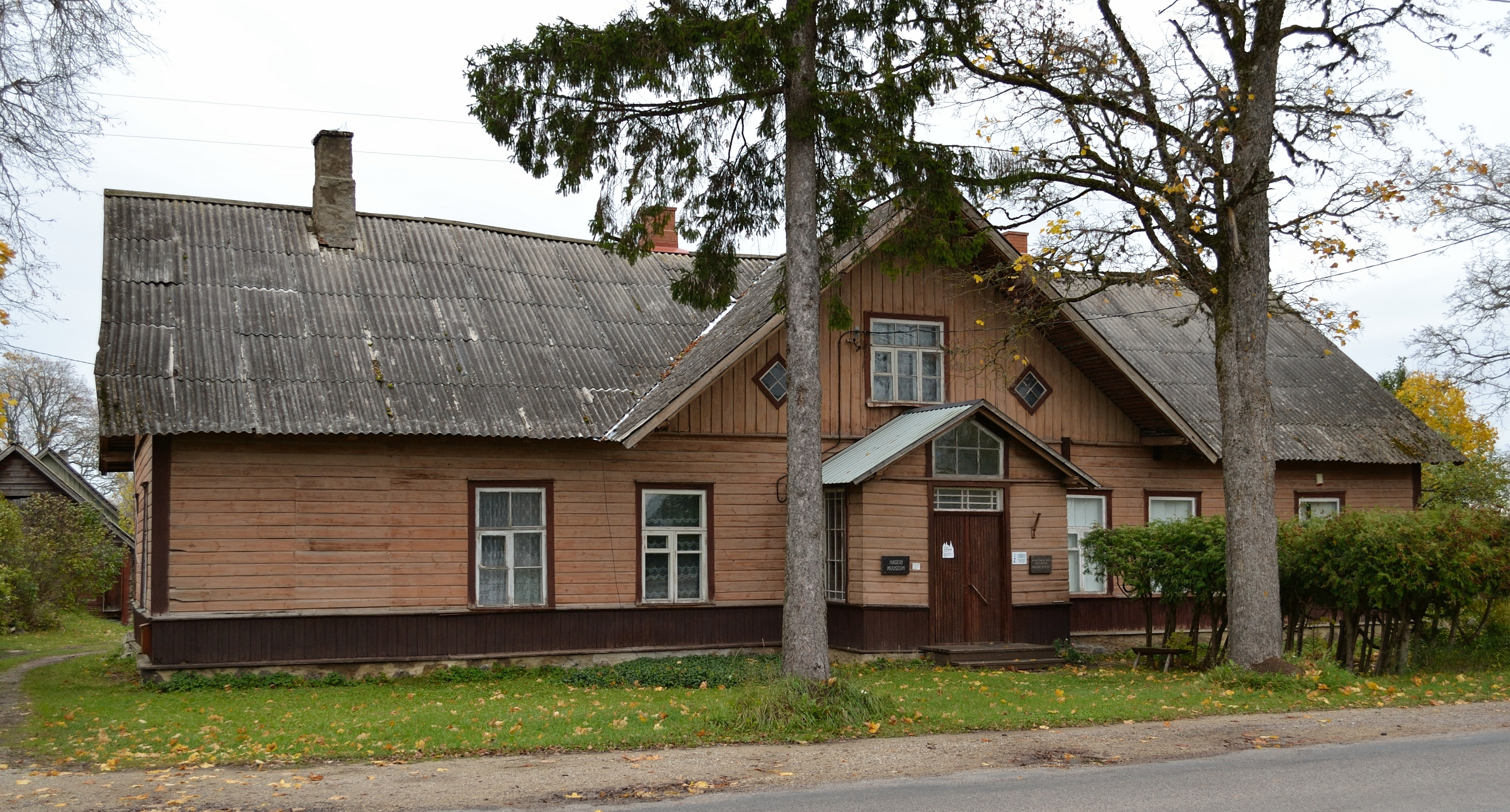
Old pharmacy

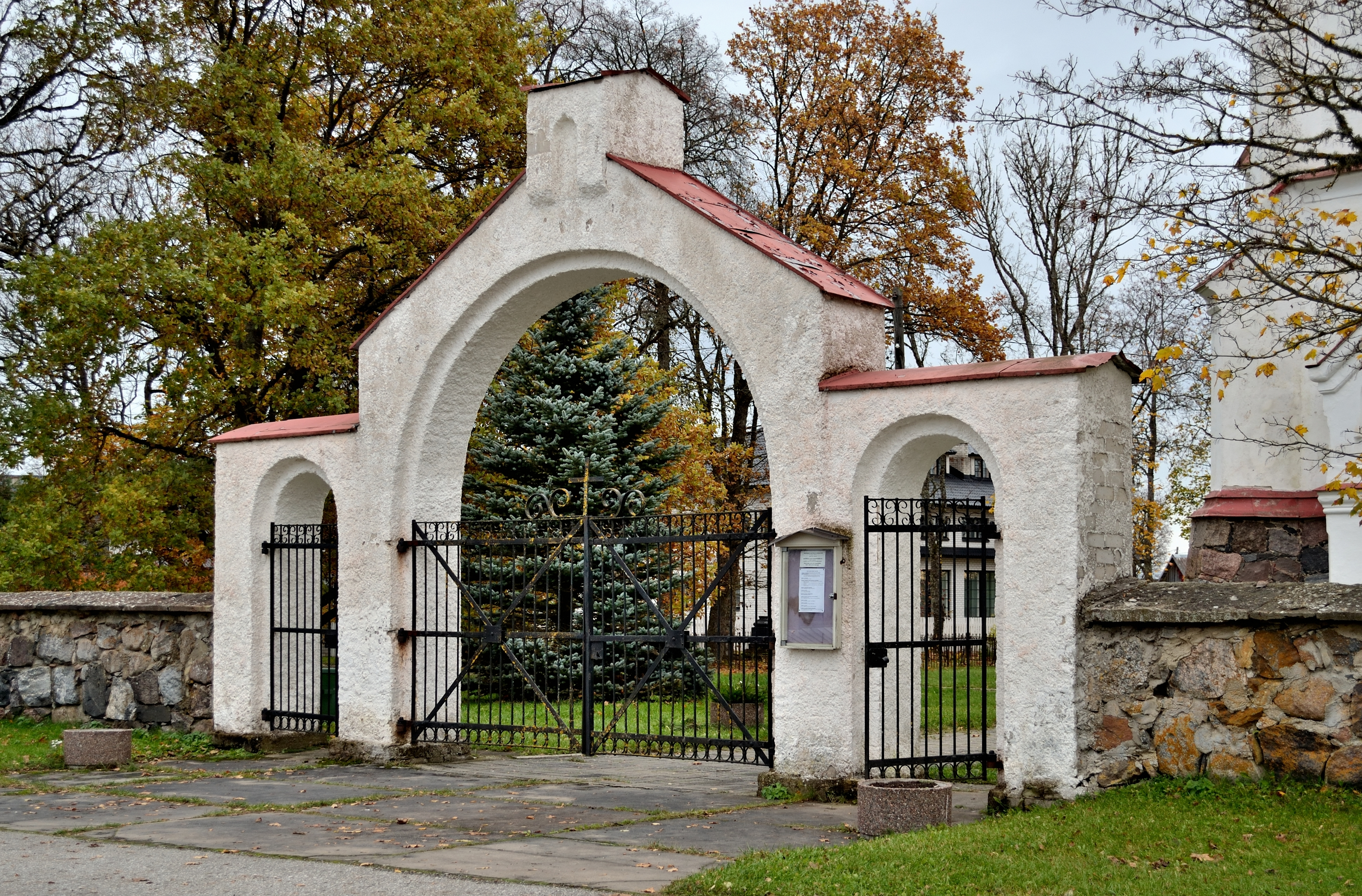
Churchyard gate

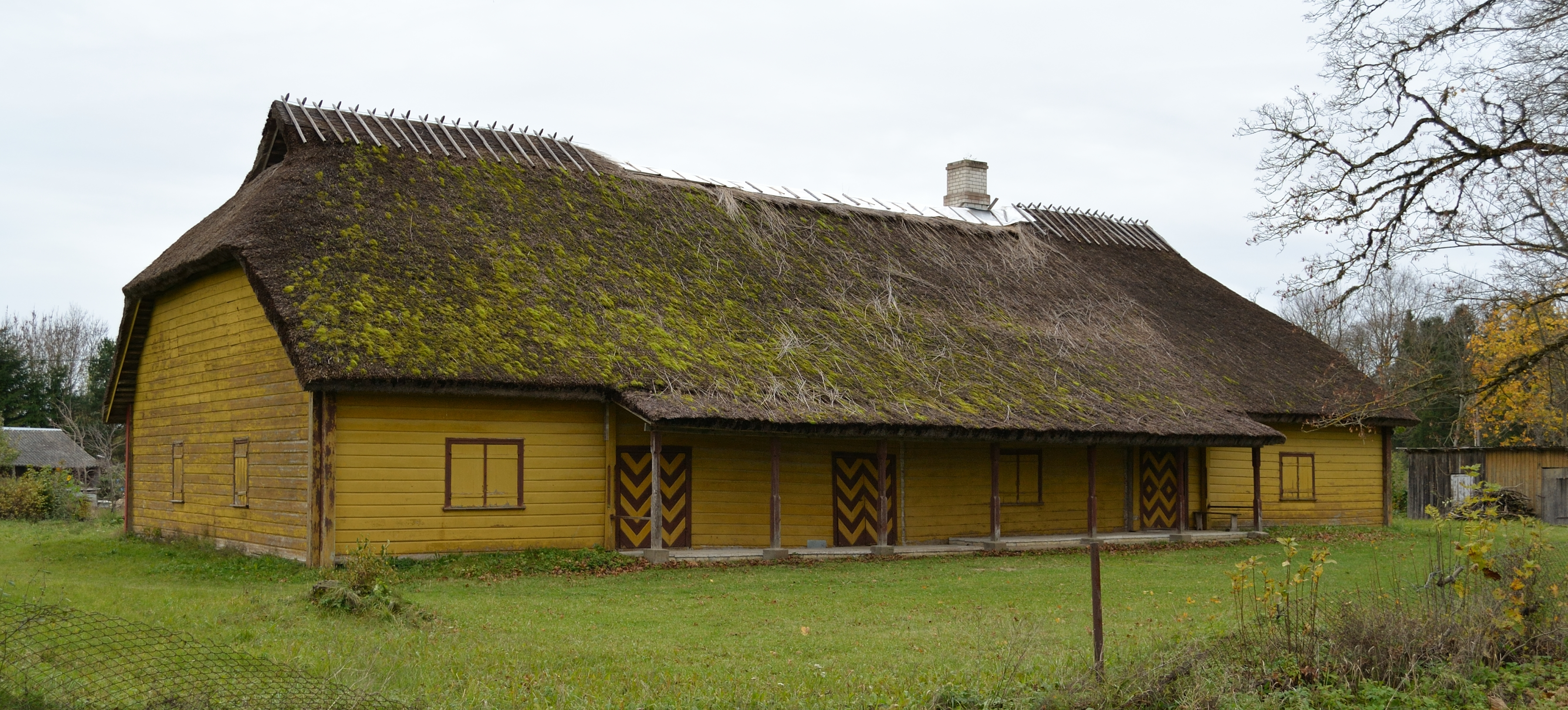
Hageri Congregation Prayer House
