= Torma (surname) =

Torma is a Hungarian surname. Notable people with the surname include:

- Anna Torma (born 1952), Hungarian-Canadian fibre artist
- August Torma (1895–1971), Estonian military officer, politician and diplomat
- Gábor Torma (born 1976), Hungarian footballer
- Julien Torma (1902–1933), French writer, playwright and poet
- Július Torma (1922–1991), Slovak boxer
- Zsófia Torma (1832–1899), Hungarian archaeologist, anthropologist and paleontologist
