= Jüri Kuuskemaa =

Estonian art historian and heritage advocate (born 1942)

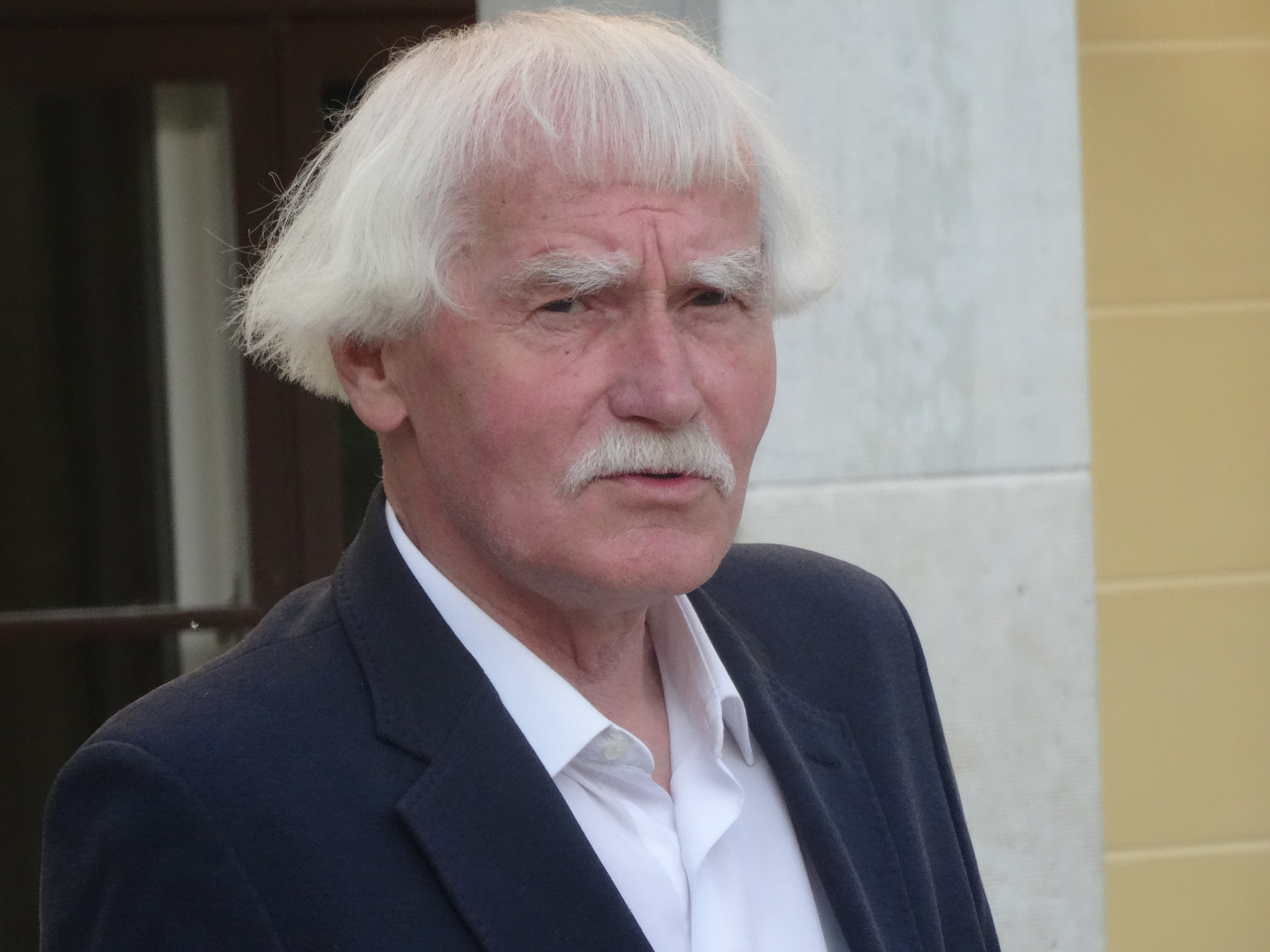
- Kuuskemaa in 2017
- Born: 25 October 1942 (age 83); Tallinn, Estonia
- Other name: Jüri Keevallik
- Citizenship: Estonian
- Education: University of Tartu
- Occupations: Art historian, curator, heritage advocate, radio host
- Known for: Research and popularisation of the history of Kadriorg and Tallinn Old Town
- Relatives: Betty Kuuskemaa (grandmother)
- Awards: Order of the White Star, IV class

Jüri Kuuskemaa (born 25 October 1942) is an Estonian art historian, curator, heritage advocate and radio host. He is best known for his long association with the Kadriorg Art Museum and for researching and popularising the history of Kadriorg and Tallinn Old Town through museum work, lectures, broadcasting and public tours. In 2003, The Baltic Times described him as "one of Estonia's best-known historical experts".

== Early life and education ==
Jüri Kuuskemaa was born in Tallinn on 25 October 1942, while Estonia was under German occupation during World War II. He studied art history at the University of Tartu and graduated in 1965.

His father, Madis Kuuskemaa, died in 1944, aged 23, at the Battle of Narva after being mobilized into the German Army with the rank of Oberfähnrich. His paternal grandparents were actors August and Betty Kuuskemaa. After his mother remarried in 1951, he took his stepfather Udo Keevallik's surname. His grandparents hoped that this name would make life easier under the Soviet regime, as his father had died fighting on the German side during the war. He used the name Jüri Keevallik until 1978.

== Career ==
While still a student, Kuuskemaa completed museum practical training at Kadriorg Palace and later worked there for many years as a curator in the Art Museum of Estonia; he later also worked at the museum's Niguliste Museum branch. In the second half of the 1970s he began archival research on the history and architecture of Kadriorg Palace. The Kadriorg Art Museum has stated that this research became a basis for the restoration of Kadriorg Palace and park in the 1990s, and that his Friday tours on Kadriorg themes were for many years one of the museum's principal public attractions.

Kuuskemaa has written extensively on Kadriorg and Tallinn's built heritage. In 2010, the publication Kadriorg. Palace's Story, which he co-authored with Aleksandra Murre, Kadi Polli and Mart Kalm, received the publication-category science award at the Estonian Annual Museum Awards.

By 2012, Kuuskemaa was serving as counsellor for cultural affairs to the mayor of Tallinn. ERR reported in 2017 that he was then working as an adviser in the field of Tallinn's history and culture.

== Public history and heritage activity ==
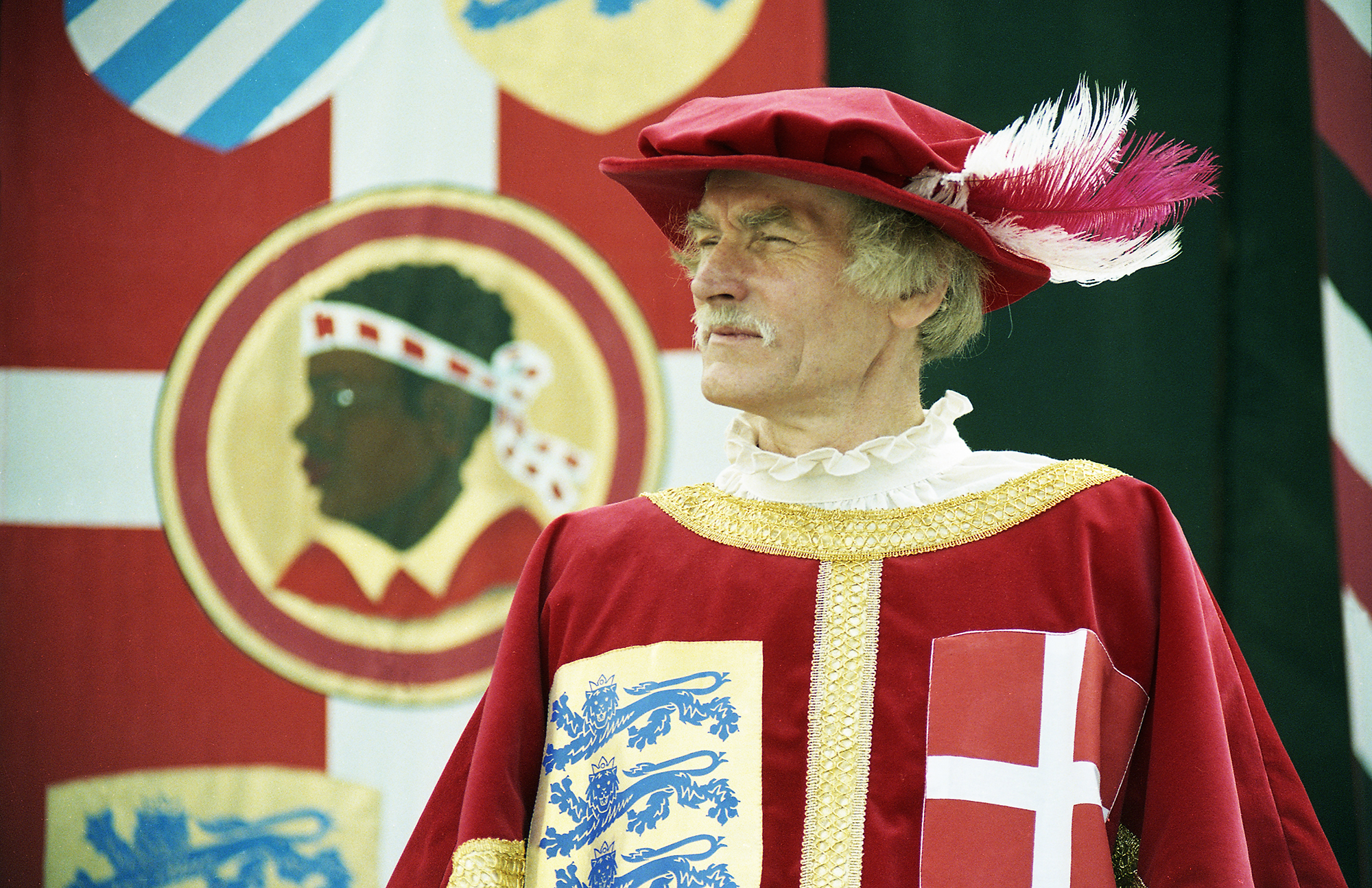
Kuskemaa at Tallinn Old Town Days in 1999

Kuuskemaa has been active in the Estonian heritage-protection movement since the late Soviet period. ERR identified him as one of the founders of the Estonian Heritage Society in 1987. Materials published by the society later listed him as a board member and, subsequently, as an honorary member.

The City of Tallinn, when awarding him the Town Hall Medal in 2007, cited his long-term work in researching and popularising Tallinn Old Town and Kadriorg through writings and radio and television programmes, as well as his long involvement in heritage activity and the organising committee of the Tallinn Old Town Days. Kuuskemaa has also been a prominent public interpreter of Tallinn's history in the media; ERR has quoted him on subjects ranging from the historical traditions of the city to the origins of Tallinn's Christmas tree claims.

He hosted the history programme Memoria on Kuku Raadio; the programme archive identifies him as its presenter and lists its most recent broadcast as 25 June 2023. The City of Tallinn also identifies him as the city's herald at the annual Tallinn Day celebrations.

== Selected works ==
Kuuskemaa's publications have focused chiefly on Kadriorg, Tallinn and historical church heritage. Among his books are:

- Historical Organs in Estonia (with Andreas Uibo, 1994)
- Peeter I ja Katariina I Tallinnas (2009)
- Kadriorg. Lossi lugu / Kadriorg: Palace's Story (with Aleksandra Murre, Kadi Polli and Mart Kalm, 2010)
- Legends and Tales of Old Tallinn (2012)

== Honours ==
Kuuskemaa received the Order of the White Star, IV class, in 2001. In 2007, the City of Tallinn awarded him the Town Hall Medal.

== Personal life ==
Jüri Kuuskemaa has been married to Aet Kuuskemaa since 1978. They have four children.
