= Paul Pinna =

Estonian actor (1884–1949)

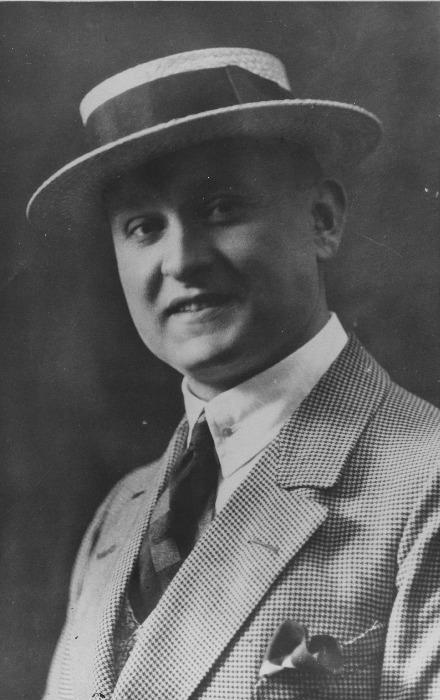

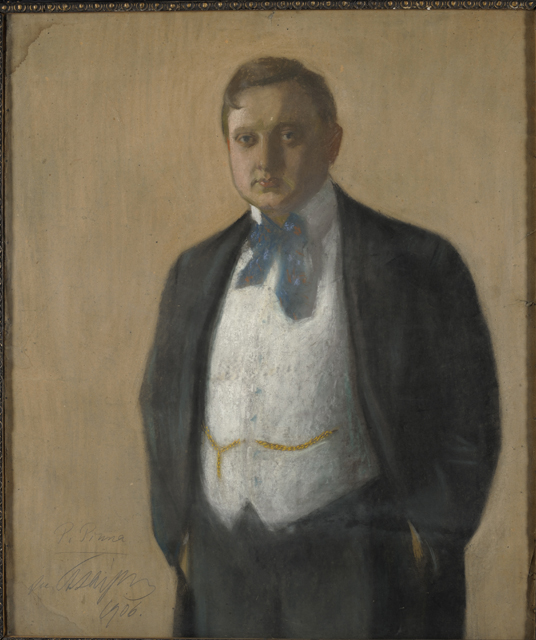
Portrait of Paul Pinna (1906) by Ants Laikmaa

Paul Pinna (3 October 1884 Tallinn – 29 March 1949 Tallinn) was an Estonian actor and stage director.

== Career ==
In 1899 he started performing on stage at the Estonia theatre society. In the early 1900s, he was engaged with the Estonia Theatre. From 1915 to 1920, he worked as a military official in Tallinn and played at the Estonia Theatre. From 1918 to 1922, he performed and worked at the Tallinn Drama Theatre. From 1936 to 1940 he was the chairman of Estonian Actors' Union.

== Family ==
Paul Pinna was married to the stage actress Netty Pinna.

== Filmography ==
- 1913: Laenatud naene as the uncle
- 1929: Dollarid as Gustav Mets's father, a businessman
- 1947: Elu tsitadellis as a worker
