= Anatoly Kaigorodov =

Russian painter

Anatoly Kaigorodov (2 November 1878 – 18 July 1945) was a Russian painter during the Belle Époque, known for his landscapes.

He was born in St. Petersburg on 2 November 1878. He was the son of the renowned natural scientist Professor Dmitri Kaigorodov. At the age of eighteen he enrolled at the Baron Stieglitz School of Fine Arts. From 1900-1902 he became a pupil of Archip Kuindzhi in St. Petersburg, and from 1902-1904 he attended the studio of the Hungarian Professor Simon Hollocy. In 1906 he studied at the Julian Academy in Paris and with Philip Colarossi.

His first paintings were exhibited in 1900 at the St. Petersburg Academy Exhibition. Starting in 1915 he was a member of the "Peredvizhniki" Travelling Exhibition. During the years 1906-1916 he won the "Kuindzhi Prize" six times, and the Stroganov Prize for his painting "Breakers" which drew much attention at the International Exhibition in Munich 1913. A number of his pictures were bought by the Russian government: i.e. "Moonlight","the Swans", "Spring Night","Autumn Wood", (Russian Gallery Leningrad). Beginning in 1920 Kaigorodov lived and worked in Tallinn, Estonia, becoming a member of the Art Society K.T.E.U. and here he also directed his private Arts School. He both sent his pictures to, and held exhibitions in, Germany (Glaspalast Munich), Berlin and Karlsruhe, the Netherlands (Den Haag) and England (London). His painting "Seashore", acquired by the Carnegie Institute (U.S.A.) gained him the Carnegie Medal in 1939.

From 1939 Kaigorodov lived in Gdansk and Poznan and mounted several private exhibitions. He visited Prague three times during the Second World War, painting a series of pictures of the old city. Kaigorodov died on 18 July 1945 in Mondsee, Salzkammergut in Austria. His pictures may also be found in the Tretyakov Gallery (Moscow), the Russian gallery (St. Petersburg), the Art Museum of Estonia (Tallinn), the Slav Institute (Prague) and the Belgrade Gallery. Several dozens of his paintings were left behind in Poznan in January 1945 and these occasionally surface on the international art market.

Kagorodov was mainly a landscape painter within the Russian tradition, but he also produced a number of genre paintings and portraits. He specialized in seascapes and depictions of water and clouds were his particular element. As a medium he preferred tempera which he used to very great effect.
