= Tõrma, Lääne-Viru County =

Village in Estonia

Coordinates: 59°18′43″N 26°19′35″E

Tõrma
- Village
- Interactive map of Tõrma
- Country: Estonia
- County: Lääne-Viru County
- Parish: Rakvere Parish
- Time zone: UTC+2 (EET)
  - Summer (DST): UTC+3 (EEST)

Tõrma is a village in Rakvere Parish, Lääne-Viru County, in northeastern Estonia.

== Notable people ==
Notable people that were born or lived in Tõrma include the following:

- Hartius Möller (1885–1942), actor
