= Institute of Theology of the Estonian Evangelical Lutheran Church =

Private vocational university of the Estonian Evangelical Lutheran Church

Coordinates: 59°26′18″N 24°44′48″E

- Estonian: Eesti Evangeelse Luterliku Kiriku Usuteaduse Instituut
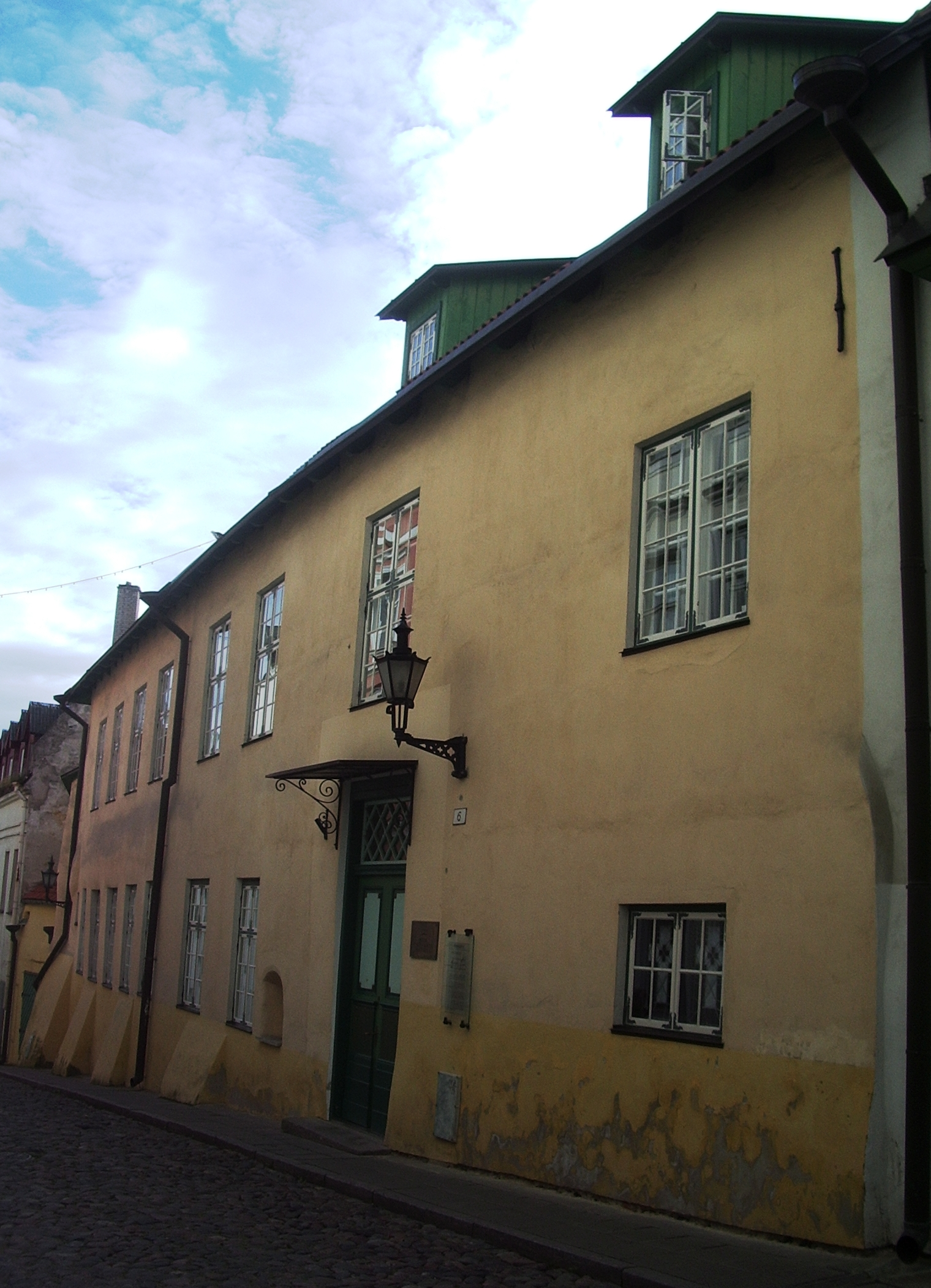
- Building of the Institute of Theology at Pühavaimu 6, Tallinn
- Established: 1946; 80 years ago
- Location: Tallinn, Estonia
- Website: www.eelkui.ee

The Institute of Theology of the Estonian Evangelical Lutheran Church (Estonian: Eesti Evangeelse Luterliku Kiriku Usuteaduse Instituut, or Estonian: EELK Usuteaduse Instituut) is a private university in Tallinn, Estonia, established in 1946 (80 years ago). It is situated next to the Church of the Holy Spirit, Tallinn.

== See also ==
- List of universities in Estonia
