= Tartu Academy of Theology =

Private university in Tartu, Estonia

Coordinates: 58°23′19.55″N 26°43′25.58″E

Tartu Academy of Theology (Estonian: Tartu Teoloogia Akadeemia) is a private university in Tartu, Estonia, founded on 16 September 1992 (33 years ago).

== See also ==
- List of universities in Estonia
