= List of wetlands of Estonia =

This is list of major wetlands (including bogs) in Estonia. The list is incomplete.

Name	Area (ha)	Location (county, parish)	Further info	Image
Aguparra Bog		Harju County, Anija Parish		
Emajõe-Suursoo		Tartu County	Large swampland around the river Emajõgi	
Endla Wetland Complex				
Epu-Kakerdi Wetland Complex				
Järvesoo		Lääne-Viru County		
Kautla Bog		Järva County	part of Epu-Kakerdi Wetland Complex	
Kakerdaja Bog		Järva County, Järva Parish		
Kodru Bog		Järva County	part of Epu-Kakerdi Wetland Complex	
Korva Bog		Valga County		
Koigi Bog		Saare County		
Koitjärve Bog		Harju County, Anija Parish		
Krivasoo Bog		Ida-Viru County		
Kuresoo Bog	9000 ha	Viljandi County	Located in Soomaa National Park. The largest bog in Estonia ("Soomaa" means "Bogland")	
Laeksaare Bog		Järva County	part of Epu-Kakerdi Wetland Complex	
Lavassaare Wetland Complex				
Loosalu Bog	3373	Rapla County		
Luhasoo				
Muraka Bog				
Niitvälja Bog	100 ha	Harju County, Lääne-Harju Parish		
Õismäe Bog		Harju County, Tallinn		
Ördi Bog	7154	Viljandi County		
Orkjärv Bog	3281	Harju County, Nissi Parish		
Pääsküla Bog	900	Harju County		
Parika Bog	3426	Viljandi County		
Peedla Wetland Complex				
Puhatu Bog				
Pususoo		Harju County		
Ratva Bog		Ida-Viru County		
Rubina Bog (or Lagesoo)		Valga County		
Selisoo		Ida-Viru County		
Soosaare Bog		Viljandi County		
Tabasalu Bog				
Tõlinõmme Bog				
Tolkuse Bog				
Valgesoo				
Viru Bog	235	Harju County		
