= Vetepere =

Village in Estonia

- Village
- Location in Estonia
- Coordinates: 59°08′00″N 25°38′21″E
- Country: Estonia
- County: Järva County
- Municipality: Järva Parish
- First mentioned: 1507

Population (2011 Census)
  - Total: 27

Vetepere is a village in Järva Parish, Järva County in northern-central Estonia. As of the 2011 census, the settlement's population was 27. With a comparatively large area, Vetepere comprises several bogs including Kakerdaja, Kautla, Kodru and Laeksaare bogs. Vetepere is passed by the Jägala, Ambla and Tarvasjõgi rivers.

The place was first mentioned as Karuvõhma (Corgewames) in 1507. In 1538 a manor with the same name was mentioned. In the 1570s when the owner was J. Wetberg, the place gained the name of Vetepere. In 1694 it was merged to Albu manor. In 1782 the Vetepere (Uue-Albu) cattle manor was mentioned.

One of the most notable Estonian writers A. H. Tammsaare (1878–1940), was born on one of the bog islands in Vetepere. His notable novel Truth and Justice's (part I) main location Vargamäe farm appears very similar to Tammsaare's birthplace. In 1958, a museum dedicated to Tammsaare was opened there.

In the village, there is also Simisalu observation tower and camping area. The tower is 18 metres high.

== Gallery ==
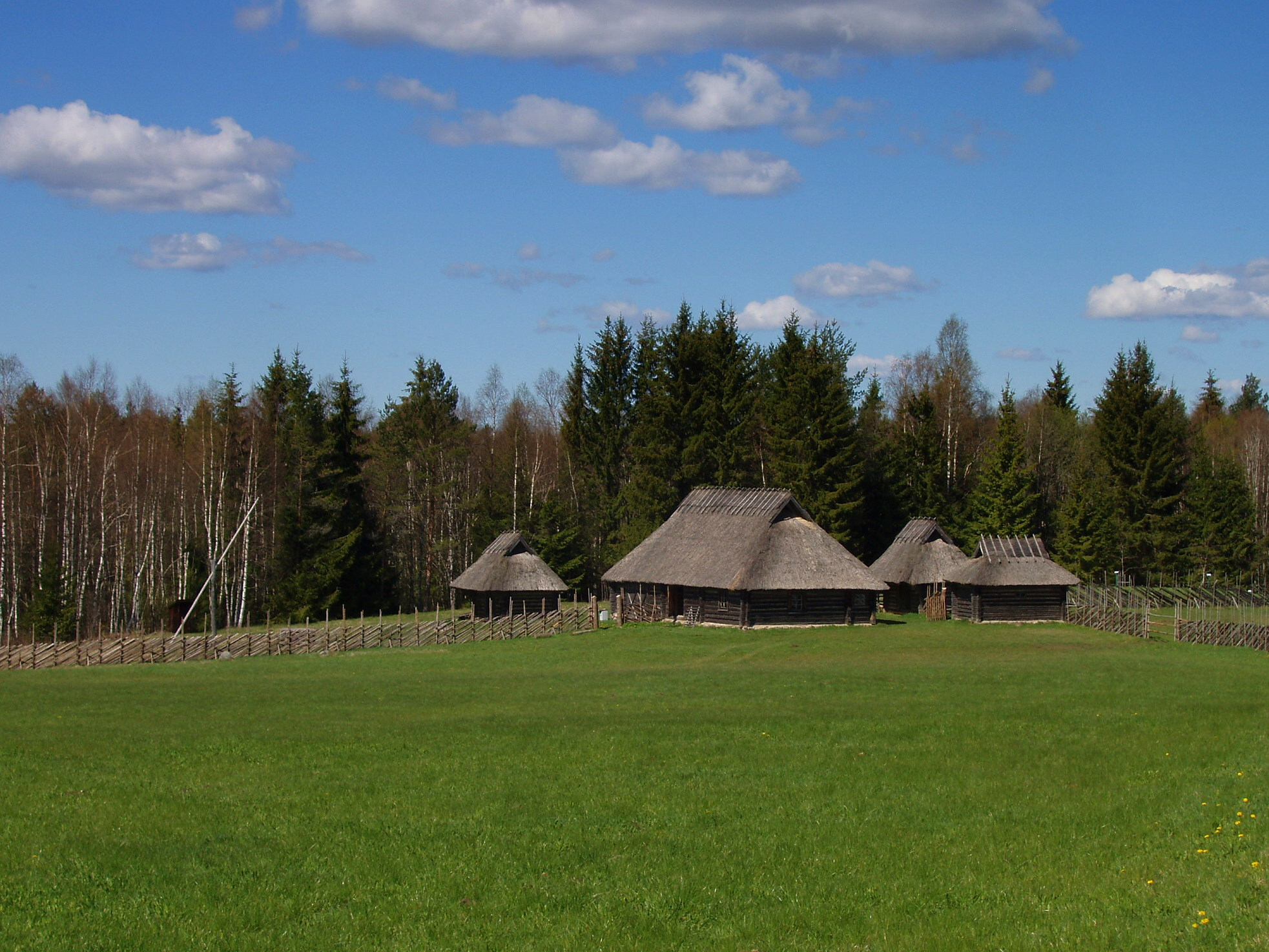
A. H. Tammsaare museum

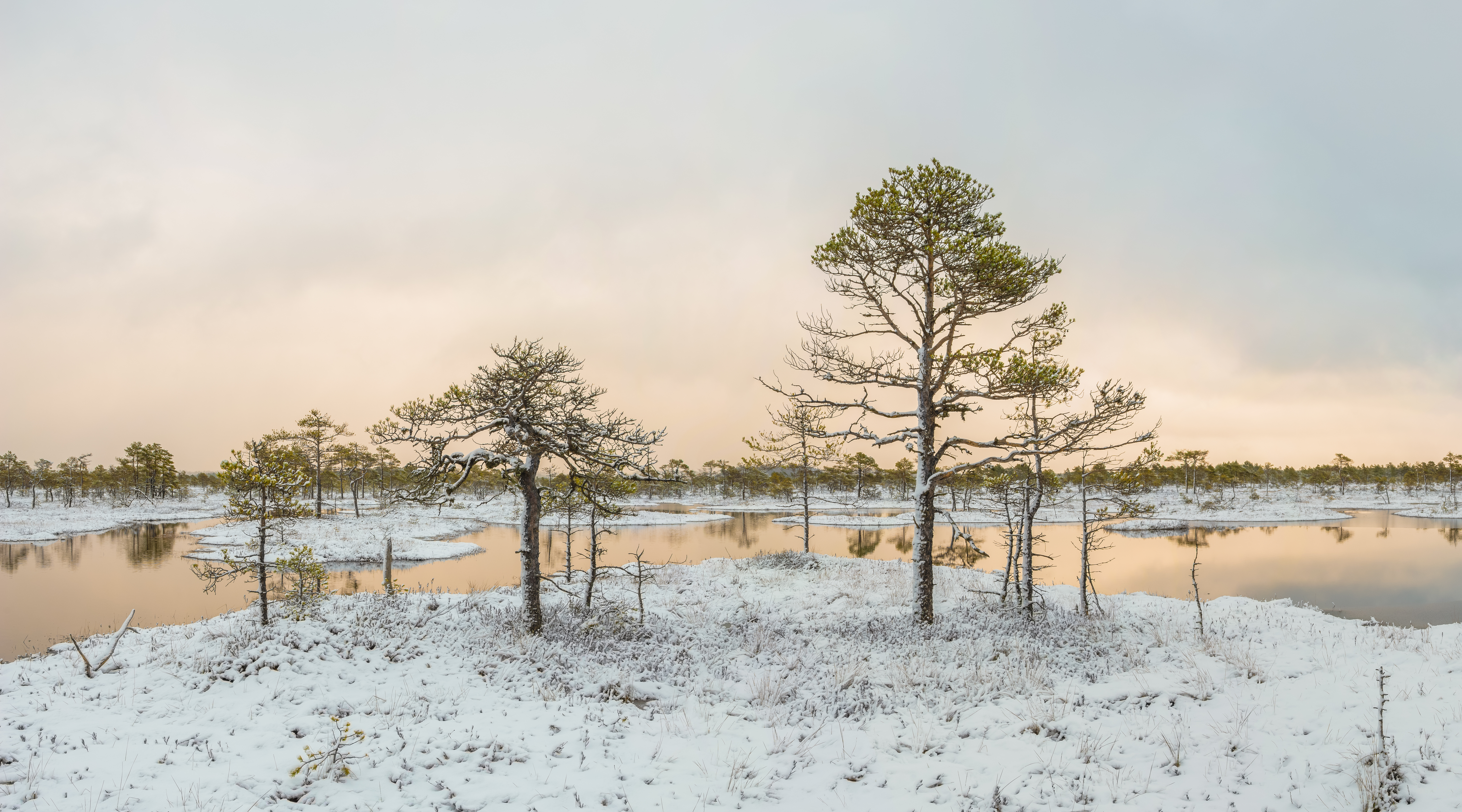
Kakerdaja bog in winter

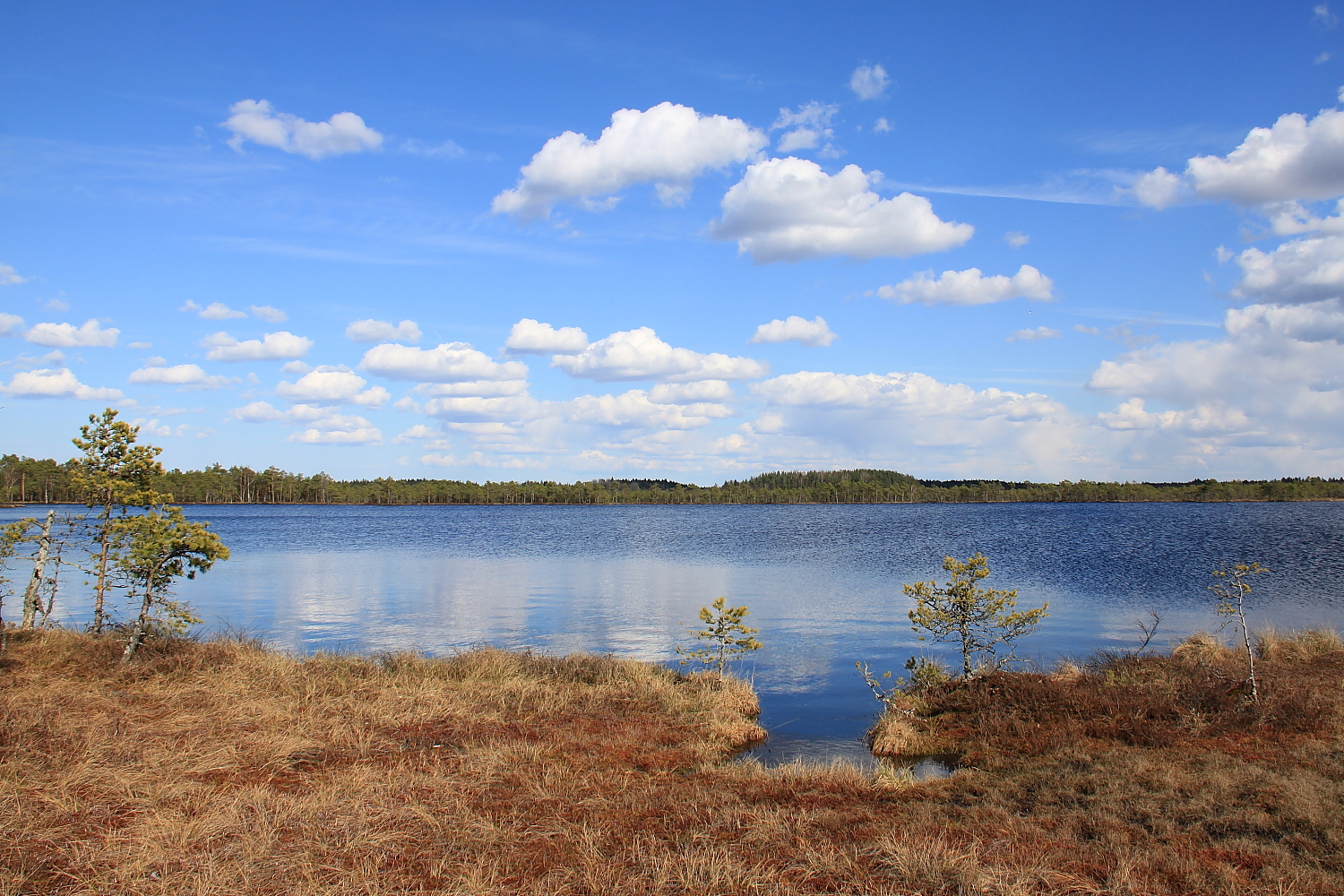
Lake Kakerdi in Kakerdaja bog

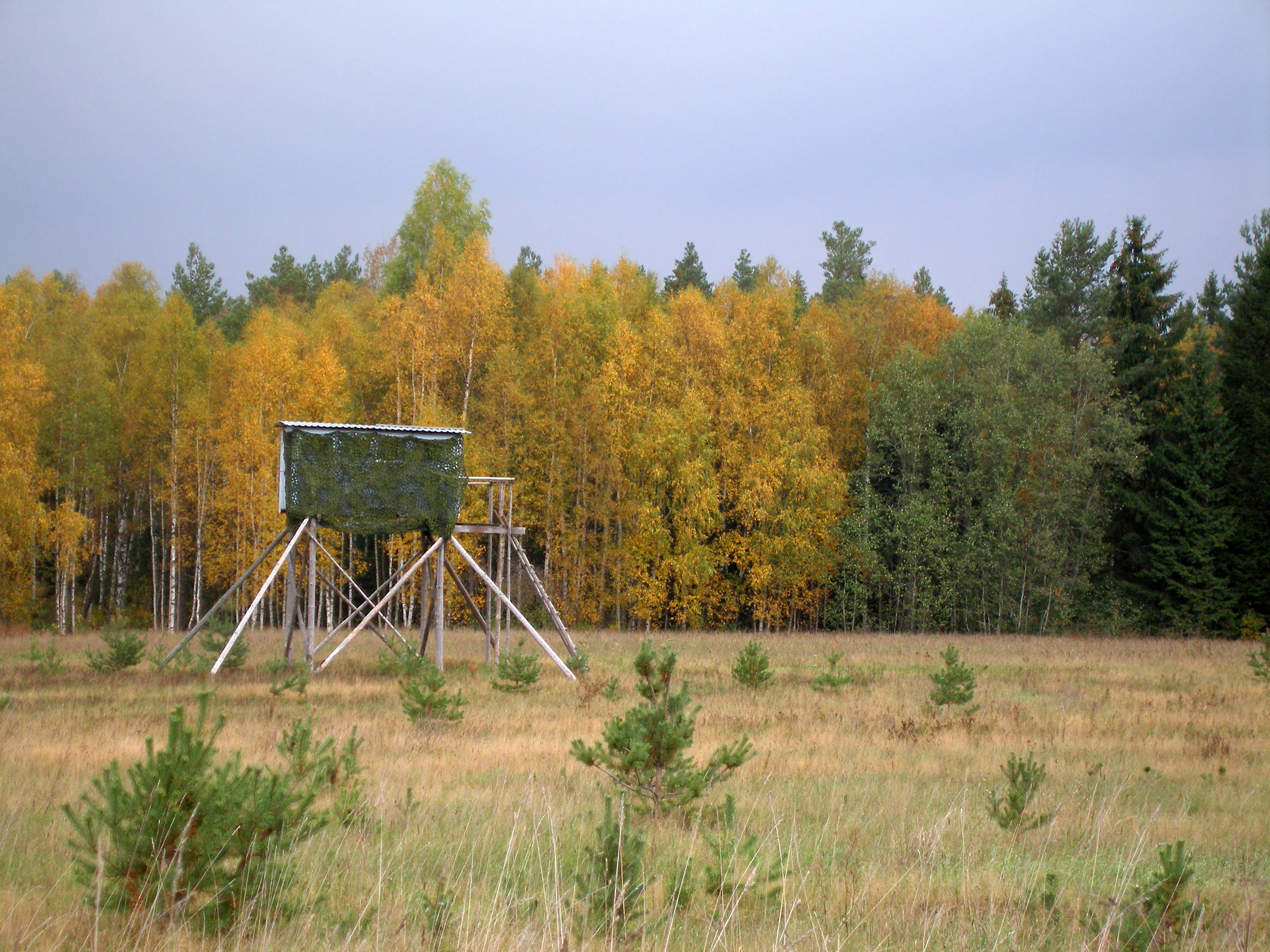
A hunting blind near Kakerdaja bog
