= Leida Rammo =

Estonian actress (1924–2020)

- Born: 18 April 1924; Tallinn, Estonia
- Died: 23 July 2020 (aged 96); Tallinn, Estonia
- Occupations: Actress, theatre director
- Years active: 1946–2015
- Spouse: Avo Lorents
- Children: 1

Leida Rammo (18 April 1924 – 23 July 2020) was an Estonian stage, radio, television, and film actress and theatre director whose career spanned over seven decades.

== Early life and education ==
Leida Rammo was the eldest of two children born in Tallinn to Magnus Siigur and Alide Marie Johanna Rammo. Her younger sister was children's author and dramaturge Helju Rammo (1926–1998). Her maternal grandmother was an Estonian Swede and her first cousin was poet Adolf Rammo.

Rammo's mother supported the family as a flower seller and raised the children alone. Her parents were not married and she and her sister took their mother's maiden name. Although her father lived in Tallinn, Rammo had little interaction with him whilst growing up. Since early childhood, she was interested in theatre and had aspired to become an actress. She attended primary and secondary schools in Tallinn, graduating from Tallinn IV Gymnasium in 1942 while Estonia was under German occupation during World War II.

== Career ==
Shortly after graduating from secondary school, Rammo left Estonia to work as an au pair and domestic servant for a Spanish-born woman and her German husband in Aussig, in the German-annexed Sudetenland. As the war dragged on, Rammo, along with the family, moved to Vienna, where she also studied drama until the continuation of the war forced her abandon her studies. While in Austria, she lived through the Allied air raids and the Vienna Offensive.

Rammo had lost contact with her mother and sister during the later stages of the war and assumed they had fled Estonia for Sweden when the Soviets reoccupied the country in 1944. Following the end of hostilities, she became a displaced person and met a young Belgian man named François on a train who offered her a place to stay with his family in Liège.

After several months in Belgium, she contemplated emigrating to the United States of America, but ultimately decided to return to Estonia, which had been reoccupied and annexed by the Soviet Union. When she arrived back in Estonia she was surprised to find that her mother and sister had remained in the country.

In 1946, she enrolled in the now defunct Estonian State Theatre Institute in Tallinn to study acting, graduating in 1950. Among her graduating classmates were actors Olev Tinn, Einari Koppel, and Linda Rummo, and filmmaker Leida Laius.

=== Stage ===
Leida Rammo had a prolific career as a stage actress; in 1950, she began her first engagement at the Tallinn State Drama Theatre (now, the Estonian Drama Theatre). Throughout her over seventy-year career, she has held engagements at nearly every major theatre in Estonia, including the Estonian National Opera, Endla Theatre, Estonian SSR State Youth Theatre (now, the Tallinn City Theatre), and Rakvere Theatre, and has appeared as an actress on the stages of numerous other theatres throughout the country. She has also worked as a theatre director, notably at the A. H. Tammsaare Folk Theater between 1958 and 1963 and again from 1972 until 1984, the Paul Pinna Folk Theatre from 1963 until 1965, and at the Noorus Folk Theatre from 1966 until 1968.

In 2015, the Estonian National Culture Foundation helped establish the Leida Rammo City Theatre Foundation with the aim of recognizing and supporting the creative endeavors of individuals within the Tallinn City Theatre. A scholarship has been awarded annually to those associated with the theatre. Past recipients include Külli Teetamm and Indrek Ojari (2016), Epp Eespäev (2017), Alo Kõrve (2018), Hele Kõrve (2019), and Kaspar Velberg (2021).

=== Film and television ===
In addition to her roles on stage, Leida Rammo had an extensive film career, appearing in over thirty feature films. Her first significant film role was that of Lisete in the 1964 Grigori Kromanov and Jüri Müür-directed Tallinnfilm epic-drama Põrgupõhja uus Vanapagan, based on the 1939 novel of the same name by A. H. Tammsaare. Rammo, however, was initially displeased when she saw herself in film dailies and was overly-critical of her appearance and acting, but the following year accepted a smaller role in the Tallinnfilm drama Mäeküla piimamees, directed by former Estonian State Theatre Institute classmate Leida Laius, and adapted from the 1916 novel of the same name by Eduard Vilde. In 1967, she appeared as Klara Kukk in the popular Veljo Käsper-directed Tallinnfilm comedy Viini postmark and followed with the role of Hermiine in the 1968 Kaljo Kiisk-directed Tallinnfilm historic-thriller Hullumeelsus.

Rammo worked steadily in films throughout the 1970s. Some notable performances of the era include the roles of Elve in the 1972 Kaljo Kiisk-directed drama Maaletulek, and as Laine in the 1972 Sulev Nõmmik-directed comedy television film Noor pensionär for Eesti Telefilm. In 1983, she appeared in the Kaljo Kiisk-directed Nipernaadi, an adaptation of August Gailit's 1928 novel Toomas Nipernaadi. In 1985, she appeared in the role of Anna on the Eesti Televisioon (ETV) series Rudolf ja Irma, based on the 1934 novel Elu ja armastus by A. H. Tammsaare. In 1988, she played the role of Marta Tooming in the Leida Laius-directed drama Varastatud kohtumine.

Rammo continued to appear in films throughout the 1990s, albeit often in smaller roles. Some notable performances of the era include the 1992 Lembit Ulfsak-directed family-comedy film Lammas all paremas nurgas, the 1995 Andrew Grieve-directed English and Estonian language drama Kirjad idast, and the 1998 Rao Heidmets-directed family film Kallis härra Q, which was an adaptation of story of the same name by children's author Aino Pervik. Rammo's film roles continued into the 2000s and 2010s, with her last film role at age ninety-one in the 2015 Klaus Härö-directed Golden Globe Award-nominated historic-drama Vehkleja, starring Märt Avandi.

In her eighties and nineties, Rammo also appeared in a number of small roles or guest roles on Estonian television in the late 2000s and 2010s: the Kanal 2 crime series Kelgukoerad in 2007, the TV3 comedy-crime series Kättemaksukontor in 2010, the TV3 comedy series Ment in 2012, and the TV3 comedy series Padjaklubi in 2014.

== Personal life and death ==
Leida Rammo was married to journalist Avo Lorents, who died in 1986. The couple have one child; a daughter named Kai. She was a grandmother and great-grandmother. Rammo had been an outspoken atheist since she was a young girl.

Rammo's eyesight diminished in her later years and she spent much of her time reading at the library for the blind. Her daughter often kept her company and read to her as well.

Rammo died of natural causes on 23 July 2020, aged 96. She was buried at Pärnamäe Cemetery in the Pirita district of Tallinn on 28 July.

== Legacy ==
In 2013, a documentary titled August välja, directed by Peter Murdmaa, was released which chronicled Rammo's life. In 2014, theatre critic and scholar Eike Värk penned a biography about Leida Rammo titled Leida Rammo värvilised maailmad, published by Tänapäev.

== Acknowledgements ==
- Order of the White Star, V Class (2015)
