= Helmut Vaag =

Estonian actor and director

Helmut Vaag (born Arthur-Helmuth Vaag, 29 May 1911 – 8 July 1978) was an Estonian actor and director.

Vaag was born in Juuru Parish. From 1927 to 1931 he studied at Tallinna Töölisteater's studying studio. From 1933 to 1940 he was an actor at Tallinn Töölisteater, from 1940 to 1951 and from 1961 to 1975 at Estonian Drama Theatre, and from 1952 to 1953 at Estonian Puppet Theatre. From 1952 to 1961 he was an estrade actor at Estonian SSR State Philharmonic (nowadays Eesti Kontsert). Besides theatre roles he played also in several films.

Vaag died in 1978 in Tallinn.

== Awards ==
- 1966: Meritorious Artist of the Estonian SSR

== Filmography ==
- Põrgupõhja uus Vanapagan as Auctioneer (1964)
- Mäeküla piimamees (1965)
- Keskpäevane praam as Card player (1967)
- Viimne reliikvia as Innkeeper (1969)
- Mehed ei nuta (1969)
- The Ambassador of the Soviet Union as Daddy Gunar, fisherman (1970)
- Tuuline rand (1971)
- Noor pensionär as Leopold (1972)
- Maaletulek as Ella's husband (1973)
