= Epu-Kakerdi Wetland Complex =

Wetland complex in Estonia

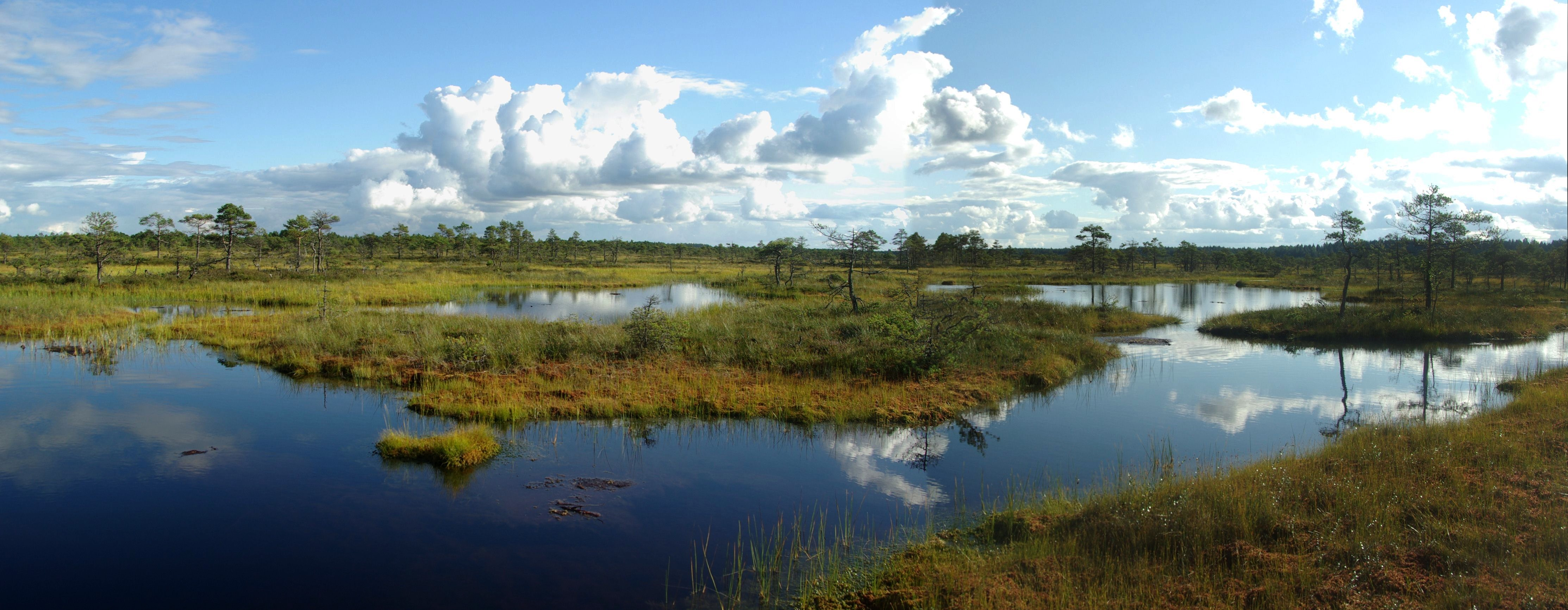
Kakerdaja Bog

Epu-Kakerdi Wetland Complex (Estonian: Epu-Kakerdi soostik) is a wetland complex in Central Estonia. The complex is one of the biggest and massive wetlands in Estonia.

The area of the complex is 39,000 hectares.

Part of the complex is under protection (Kõrvemaa Landscape Conservation Area).

The complex consists of Kakerdaja Bog, Kautla Bog and others.
