= Vääna Landscape Conservation Area =

Protected area in Estonia

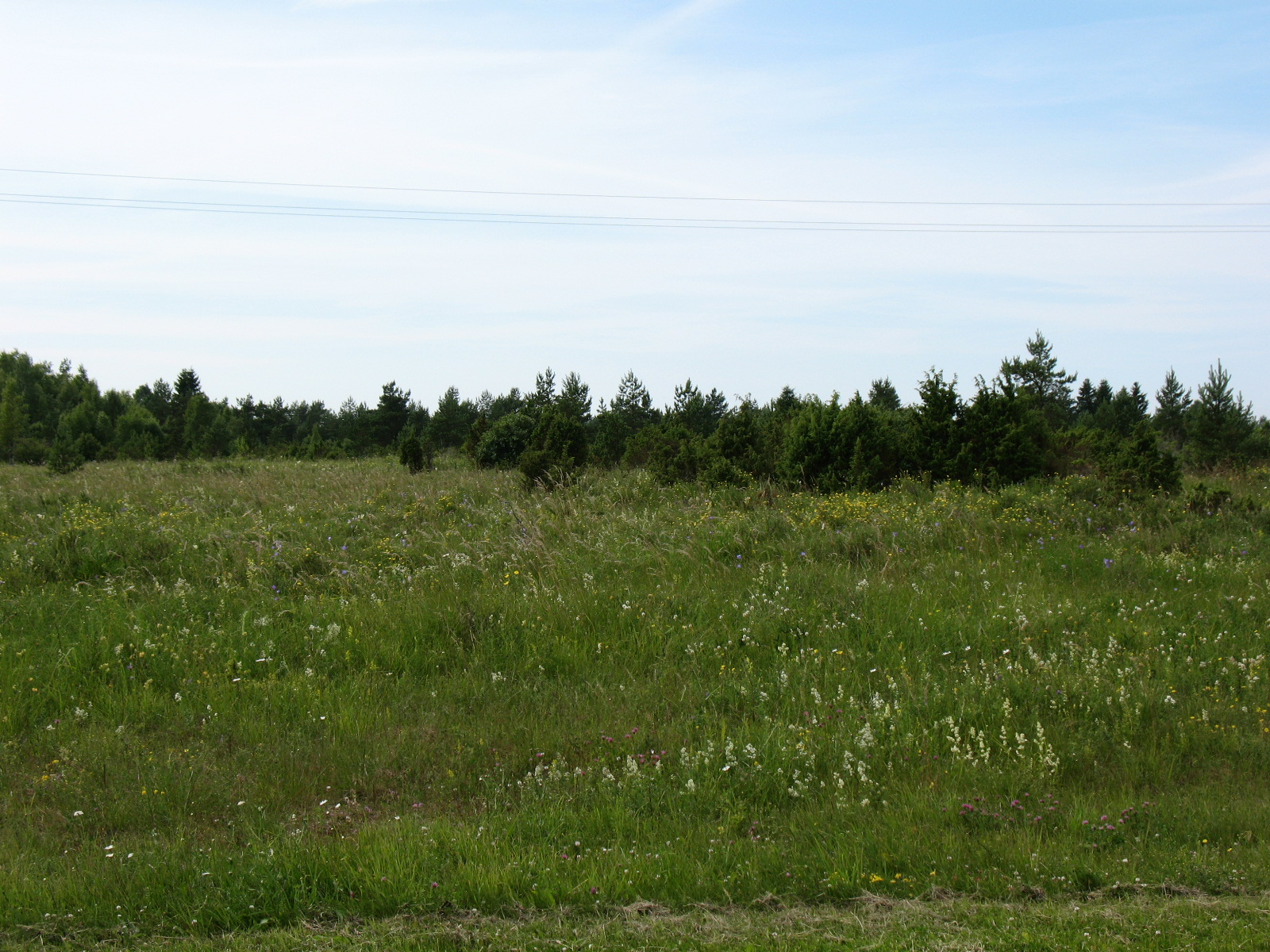

- Location within Estonia
- Location: Estonia
- Coordinates: 59°23′N 24°23′E
- Area: 408.8 ha (1,010 acres)
- Established: 1991 (2018)

Vääna Landscape Conservation Area is a nature reserve situated in Harju County, Estonia.

Its area is 408.8 ha.

The protected area was designated in 1991 to protect Tõlinõmme Lake, Tõlinõmme Bog and theirs surroundings. In 2018, the protected area was redesigned to the landscape conservation area.
