= The Ambassador of the Soviet Union =

- Russian: Посол Советского Союза
- Directed by: Georgy Natanson
- Written by: Ariadna Tur; Pyotr Tur
- Starring: Yuliya Borisova; Anatoly Ktorov; Gunārs Cilinskis; Voldemar Panso; Helmut Vaag; Ants Eskola
- Cinematography: Vladimir Nikolayev
- Music by: Veniamin Basner
- Release date: 1969
- Country: Soviet Union
- Language: Russian

The Ambassador of the Soviet Union (Russian: Посол Советского Союза) is a 1969 Soviet biographical drama film directed by Georgy Natanson.

The film tells about a woman named Yelena Koltsova, the prototype of which was Alexandra Kollontai (the first woman ambassador in world history).

== Plot ==
Set in the autumn of 1941, the film follows Soviet ambassador Elena Nikolaevna Koltsova as she navigates diplomatic challenges in Scandinavia during World War II. The narrative begins with a tense moment at the Soviet embassy, where Koltsova receives a threat amidst reports from the frontlines. Shortly afterward, she confronts accusations of Soviet bombing in Brunholm, Sweden, a claim based on a bomb fragment lacking clear identification. Using her wit, Koltsova persuades skeptical locals, including a fisherman nicknamed Father Gunnar, to re-examine the evidence, ultimately revealing German involvement. This discovery helps Sweden maintain its neutrality despite Nazi pressure.

Koltsova's diplomatic finesse is further demonstrated in her interactions with the Swedish king, who had once exiled her for revolutionary activities. Employing charm and strategic diplomacy, she bridges ideological divides to focus on trade, while also countering misconceptions about the Soviet Union at a royal ball. She negotiates with influential figures like financier Julius Helmer (based on Raoul Wallenberg), securing trade agreements that bolster the Soviet war effort. Amid her successes, Koltsova faces personal tragedy with the loss of her son on the frontlines. Yet, her efforts culminate in a significant diplomatic victory, preventing further escalation in a neighboring country and ultimately contributing to the Soviet victory. The film closes with a triumphant note, showcasing the Victory Parade of 1945, where Koltsova, alongside historical figures like Stalin and Zhukov, celebrates the end of the war.

== Cast ==
- Yuliya Borisova as Ambassador Yelena Nikolayevna Koltsova
- Anatoly Ktorov as the King
- Gunārs Cilinskis as Julius Helmer, financier (voiced by Yury Yakovlev)
- Voldemar Panso as minister of "neighboring country"
- Helmut Vaag as daddy Gunar, fisherman
- Ants Eskola as foreign minister of the kingdom (voiced by Yefim Kopelyan)
- Yevgeniya Kozyreva as Kristina Sorenson
- Yuri Puzyryov as Ivan Nikitich Morozov
- Nikolai Timofeyev as Georgy Aleksandrovich Klimov
- Ada Lundver as Countess Runge, Helmer's sister
- Ants Lauter as King's dignitary
