= Devil with a False Passport =

1964 film directed by Grigori Kromanov and Jüri Müür

Põrgupõhja uus Vanapagan
- Directed by: Grigori Kromanov; Jüri Müür
- Written by: Jüri Müür; Gennadi Kaleda
- Starring: Elmar Salulaht; Ants Eskola; Astrid Lepa; Leida Rammo; Heino Mandri
- Cinematography: Jüri Garšnek
- Edited by: Lembit Remmelgas
- Music by: Eino Tamberg
- Distributed by: Tallinnfilm
- Release date: 15 June 1964
- Running time: 94 minutes
- Country: Estonia
- Language: Estonian

Põrgupõhja uus Vanapagan (English: The Misadventures of the New Satan) is a 1964 Estonian film directed by Grigori Kromanov and Jüri Müür, based on the 1939 novel of the same name by A. H. Tammsaare. The film was produced by Tallinnfilm.

== Cast ==
- Elmar Salulaht as Vanapagan
- Ants Eskola as Kaval-Ants
- Astrid Lepa as Juula
- Leida Rammo as Lisete
- Heino Mandri as Pastor
- Olev Eskola as Constable
- Kaarel Karm as Doctor
- Jüri Järvet as Peetrus
- Jaan Saul as Kustas
- Eili Sild as Maia
- Lea Unt as Rila
- Oskar Liigand as Neighbor
- Hugo Laur as Filth hauler
- Ervin Abel as Ditchdigger
- Einari Koppel as Stone breaker
- Ants Jõgi as Peat cutter
- Ines Aru as Bride
- Mikk Mikiver as Young Ants
- Robert Gutman as Young Jürka
- Helmut Vaag as Auctioneer
- Aado Hõimre as Constable
