= A Young Retiree =

1972 television film directed by Sulev Nõmmik

- DVD Cover
- Directed by: Sulev Nõmmik
- Written by: Enn Vetemaa; Sulev Nõmmik
- Produced by: Eesti Telefilm
- Starring: Ervin Abel; Lia Laats; Marika Samussenko; Leida Rammo; Helmut Vaag
- Cinematography: Harri Rehe
- Edited by: Aino Lootus; Salme Kõrvemann
- Music by: Ülo Vinter
- Distributed by: Eesti Telefilm
- Release date: April 1, 1973
- Running time: 80 minutes
- Countries: Estonia; Soviet Union
- Language: Estonian

A Young Retiree (Estonian: Noor pensionär) is a 1972 Estonian comedy film directed by Sulev Nõmmik and written by himself and Enn Vetemaa. Together with Viimne reliikvia, Siin me oleme! and Mehed ei nuta, Noor pensionär is one of the most influential Estonian movies from the Soviet occupation era.

== Plot ==
A former ballet artist (played by Ervin Abel) unexpectedly finds himself retired and begins searching for new place in life, eventually becoming a hired tutor of a mischievous teenage daughter of a powerful mother.

== Cast ==
- Ervin Abel as Pukspuu, a young retiree
- Lia Laats as Mother
- Helmut Vaag as Leopold
- Leida Rammo as Laine
- Marika Samussenko as Marika, the daughter
- Lisl Lindau as Employment officer
- Einari Koppel as Best Man
- Silvia Urb
- Endel Pärn
- Rein Kotkas
- Harri Vasar
- Katrin Karisma
- Veera Luur
- Asta Vihandi
- Vambola Helm
- Endel Simmermann
- Gunnar Hololei
- Hardi Tiidus
