= Endel Pärn =

Estonian actor

- Born: April 21, 1914; Saint Petersburg, Governorate of Estonia, Russian Empire
- Died: April 24, 1990 (aged 76); Tallinn, Estonian Soviet Socialist Republic, USSR
- Years active: 1931-1986
- Known for: Acting

Endel Pärn (21 April 1914 – 24 April 1990) was an Estonian actor and singer.

== Early life ==
Prior to becoming an actor, Pärn went to school for hairdressing and played the drums.

== Career ==
From 1931 until 1942, he was an actor in Vanemuine Theatre in Tartu. From 1942 until 1986, he worked as an actor and operetta singer at the Estonia Theatre. He also performed in several films, primarily in background and uncredited roles. This included three Sulev Nõmmik directed comedies, Mehed ei nuta (1969), Noor pensionär (1972), and Siin me oleme! (1979).

As a singer, he released one album, Endel Pärn, in 1989.

== Awards ==
- 1964 Merited Artist of Estonian SSR
- 1975 People's Artist of the Estonian SSR
- 1984 Paul Pinna Award

== Roles ==
=== Theater ===
Year	Title	Role	Notes	Ref.
1929	Libahunt	Young Margus		
1932	The Flower of Hawaii	Cadet Bobbie Flipps		
1932	Twelfth Night, or What You Will	Sebastian		
1963	My Fair Lady	Henry Higgins		

=== Film ===
Year	Title	Role	Notes	Ref.
1960	Näitleja Joller	Restaurant Visitor (uncredited)		
1965	Külmale maale	Kohtuametnik (uncredited)		
1969	Mehed ei nuta	Glutton		
1970	Varastati Vana Toomas	Fevered historian		
1970	Kolme katku vahel	Gandersen		
1972	Noor pensionär	Wedding Guest		
1975	Mishuk			
1979	Siin me oleme!	Village man (uncredited)		
1982	Arabella, mereröövli tütar	Lahja Adam		
1984	Lurich	Parunihärra		
1984	Tonight...	Himself	Documentary	
1985	Savoy ball	Archibald		

== Discography ==
Year	Album	Label	Ref.
1989	Endel Pärn	Melodiya	
