= Melanie Rauk =

Estonian translator (1905–1978)

- Born: July 25, 1905; Pärsama, Governorate of Livonia, Russian Empire
- Died: January 25, 1978 (aged 72); Tallinn, Estonia
- Occupations: Linguist and translator

Melanie Rauk (July 25, 1905 – January 25, 1978) was an Estonian teacher and translator.

== Family and education ==
Melanie Rauk's father, Ivan (Juhan, Johan) Rauk (1880–?), was a municipal clerk, and he fled to Canada in 1906 after participating in the Russian Revolution of 1905. Melanie Rauk emigrated to Canada with her mother, Leena (or Jelena) Rauk (née Kuut 1871–1955) to join him in 1911. She graduated from high school in Prince Rupert, British Columbia, in 1923.

In 1924, she traveled with her family to Riga, and from there to Transcaucasia. In 1924 she settled in the Estonian commune of Koit in the Caucasus. From 1924 to 1930, she studied foreign languages at the Estonian Pedagogical Technical College in Leningrad, from 1930 to 1936 at the Pokrovsky Pedagogical Institute in Leningrad, and from 1936 to 1938 at the Herzen Pedagogical Institute in Leningrad.

She was married to Kristjan Kure, a professor and academic official in the Estonian SSR.

== Career ==
Rauk worked as an editor of English-language textbooks in Leningrad from 1931 to 1933, and as an English teacher at the Military Medical Academy in Leningrad from 1934 to 1938. She spent 1938 to 1939 in a prison camp, from which she returned to Estonia in 1940. She enrolled in graduate studies at the University of Tartu and studied English while working as an English teacher. Starting in October 1940, she worked as a censor at Glavlit. In 1945 she became a teacher and the head of the English department at the Chelyabinsk Pedagogical Institute.

From 1946 to 1947, she was a lecturer, associate professor, and head of the department at the Tallinn Polytechnic Institute. From 1947 to 1949, she was an English language teacher at the Leningrad Textile Institute, and from 1949 to 1954 the head of the English language department at Tallinn Pedagogical University. From 1954 to 1977 she taught grammatical theory and was the head of the English department at Tallinn Pedagogical University.

Rauk carried out research on pedagogy and language teaching methodology. She published more than 60 English textbooks and dictionaries, including reprints. She also translated Estonian fiction into English.

== Bibliography ==
- 1958–1975: English V–XI klassile (with Alice Ehin, Helmi Ole, and Clarissa Parts)
- 1974: A Reader's Dictionary of Phrase and Idiom (with Clarissa Parts)
- 1980: Inglise-eesti sõnaraamat koolidele (5th edition 1988)

=== Translations ===
- 1976: Milkman of the Manor by Eduard Vilde (Tallinn: Eesti Raamat)
- 1977: Miniatures by A. H. Tammsaare (Tallinn: Eesti Raamat)
- 1980: The Windswept Shore by Aadu Hint (Tallinn: Perioodika)
- 1983: Spring (with Aino Jõgi) by Oskar Luts (Tallinn: Perioodika)

== Awards ==
- 1965: Honored Teacher of the Estonian SSR
