= Kõrboja peremees =

1922 novel by A. H. Tammsaare

- Title page for Kõrboja peremees (1922)
- Author: A. H. Tammsaare
- Language: Estonian
- Genre: Novel
- Publisher: Maa
- Publication date: 1922
- Publication place: Estonia

Kõrboja peremees (The Master of Kõrboja) is a novel by Estonian author A. H. Tammsaare. It was first published in 1922.

Based on the novel, a feature film with the same name was released in 1979 by Tallinnfilm. The film was directed by Leida Laius.
