= Lia Laats =

Estonian actress (1926–2004)

- Born: 17 February 1926; Tallinn, Estonia
- Died: 24 April 2004 (aged 78); Tallinn, Estonia
- Other name: Lia Vaha
- Occupation: Actress
- Years active: 1946-1988
- Spouse: Kalju Vaha (1947-1962; divorced)
- Awards

Lia Laats (2 February 1926 – 24 April 2004) was an Estonian stage and film actress whose career spanned over forty years.

== Early life ==
Lia Laats was born in Tallinn to Karl René Laats and Helmi Karin Laats (née Tähe), who both worked as domestic servants. She had two older half-siblings from her father's previous marriage. She studied at the National Drama Theatre (now, the Estonian Drama Theatre) in Tallinn, but left her studies in 1946 without graduating.

== Stage career ==
From 1946 until 1948 (and again, from 1976 until 1980), Laats performed at the Estonia Theatre, in dramatic roles, comedies, operettas and musicals with the Estonian National Opera. From 1948 until 1951 (and again, from 1951–1960; and from 1980-1981) she was engaged at the Endla Theatre. From 1960 until 1976, she was engaged at the Vanemuine theatre. One of her most memorable roles at the Vanemuine was that of Jocasta in Sophocles' Oedipus Rex in 1963. From 1952 until the mid-1960s, she also performed in variety theatre with stage partner Helmut Vaag; the two often performing in comedic works.

Laats' work on the stage was prolific during her career, lasting over four decades.

== Film ==
Lia Laats made her screen debut in the 1947 Herbert Rappaport directed Soviet-Estonian language drama Elu tsitadellis (English: Life in a Citadel) for Lenfilm, based on the 1946 play of the same name by Estonian author and communist politician August Jakobson. Elu tsitadellis was the first post-World War II Estonian feature film, following the annexation of Estonia into the Soviet Union. The plot largely revolves around the arrival of the Soviets following the German occupation of Estonia in 1944 and justice being meted out to Estonians who had collaborated with German occupying forces. The film ends with jubilant Estonians celebrating their "liberation" and inclusion into the Soviet Union; accepting the communist ideology. Both the film and Laats were awarded the Stalin Prize.

Following several more dramas, Lia Laats was paired with Estonian singer Georg Ots in the 1961 Viktor Nevežin directed light comedy Juhuslik kohtumine. Laats' most memorable roles are arguably in three comedies directed by Sulev Nõmmik and paired onscreen with actor Ervin Abel. The first of which was 1968's Mehed ei nuta, followed by Noor pensionär in 1972 and Siin me oleme! in 1979. The three films proved to be very popular and are still often broadcast on Estonian television.

== Personal life and death ==
Lia Laats was married to actor Kalju Vaha from 1947 until their divorce in 1962. The couple had two sons; Jaak (born 1948) and Madis (born 1951). Following her divorce, she began a long-term relationship with actor Harry Karro. The couple had a daughter, Kadi, in 1965. Although the couple were often referred to as married by media and other sources, Laats and Karro never officially or legally wed. The couple settled in the village of Külitse in Tartu County for many years before moving to Õismäe the year prior to Laats' death. They remained in a relationship until Laats' death. Karro died in 2009.

In the mid-1980s Laats began suffering a series of debilitating health issues. She had a heart attack, followed by a second heart attack in 1986 and was then required to have a pacemaker procedure. Later, she was diagnosed with and treated for cancer. In December 2003, her youngest son Madis was killed in an automobile accident. On 1 April 2004, Laats suffered a cerebral infarction that left her unable to speak and partially paralyzed. She was hospitalized in Tallinn, where she died on 24 April 2004, aged 78.

== Acknowledgements ==
- Merited Artist Estonian SSR (1968)
- Meie Mats Humour award (1990)
- Order of the White Star, V Class
- Estonian Actors Union, Honorary Member

== Legacy ==
On 2 February 2016, on what would have been Lia Laats' 90th birthday, ETV2 broadcast a retrospective of Laats' career, featuring several of Laats' films, interviews and television appearances.

== Filmography ==
Year	Title	Role	Notes
1947	Elu tsitadellis	Lydia	Feature film
1957	Pöördel		Feature film
1958	Esimese järgu kapten	Cabaret Dancer	Feature film
1959	Veealused karid	Lidia Lauer	Feature film
1961	Juhuslik kohtumine	Marika	Feature film
1968	Mehed ei nuta	Nurse	Television film
1972	A Young Retiree	Mother	Television film
1978	Siin me oleme!	Coffee Grinder	Television film
