= Elmar Salulaht =

Estonian actor and singer

Elmar Salulaht (until 1937 Elmar Soop; 17 April 1910 – 7 October 1974) was an Estonian actor and opera singer (bass).

Salulaht was born in Tartu. From 1923 to 1936 he worked as a metalworker. He studied singing with Georg Stahlberg. From 1936 to 1939 he was a singer and actor at the Vanemuine theatre in Tartu and from 1939 to 1940 at the Narva Theatre. From 1942 to 1943 he was an actor at the Estonian Theatre and from 1943 to 1974, he returned to the at the Vanemuine.

Besides stage roles he also appeared as an actor on films: he played the lead role the feature film Põrgupõhja uus Vanapagan (1964). Salulaht died in 1974 in Tartu and is buried in Rahumäe cemetery.

== Awards ==
- Meritorious Artist of the Estonian SSR (1967)

== Filmography ==
- 1964: Põrgupõhja uus Vanapagan (1964)
- 1967: Keskpäevane praam (1967)
- 1970: Kolme katku vahel (1970)
- 1970: Tuulevaikus (1970)
- 1972: Maaletulek (1972)
- 1972: Väike reekviem suupillile (1972)
