= Voldemar Panso =

Estonian actor (1920–1977)

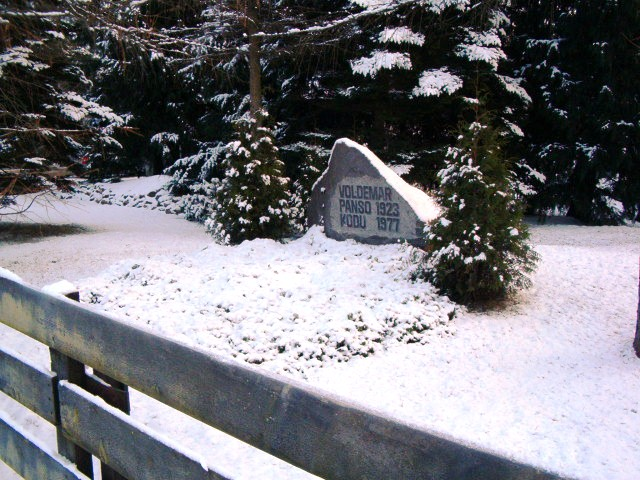
Memorial stone to Panso in Kivimäe, Tallinn

Voldemar Panso (30 November 1920 – 27 December 1977) was an Estonian stage and film actor, theatre director and pedagogue.

== Biography ==
In 1941, he graduated from Tallinn Conservatory State Stage Art School and in 1955 the Moscow State Theatre Art Institute.

1941-1950 he was an actor in the Estonian Drama Theatre. 1955-1958 he was stage director and 1970-1976 head stage director. 1957-1977 he directed Tallinn State Conservatory Stage Art Department.

He was one of the founders of the ESSR State Youth Theatre and 1965-1970 its first head stage director.

== Filmography ==
- Life in the Citadel (1947) as Jaan Sander
- Vallatud kurvid (1959) as watchmaker
- The Ambassador of the Soviet Union (1969) as minister of "neighboring country"

== Awards and honors ==
- Order of the Badge of Honour (1956)
- Honored Art Worker of the Estonian SSR (1964)
- Estonian SSR State Prize (1965)
- People's Artist of the Estonian SSR (1968)
- People's Artist of the USSR (1977)
- Juhan Smuul literary award (1981; posthumous)
- Order of the Red Banner of Labour
