= Pärsama =

Village in Estonia

Coordinates: 58°30′N 22°45′E

- Village
- Interactive map of Pärsama
- Country: Estonia
- County: Saare County
- Parish: Saaremaa Parish
- Time zone: UTC+2 (EET)
  - Summer (DST): UTC+3 (EEST)

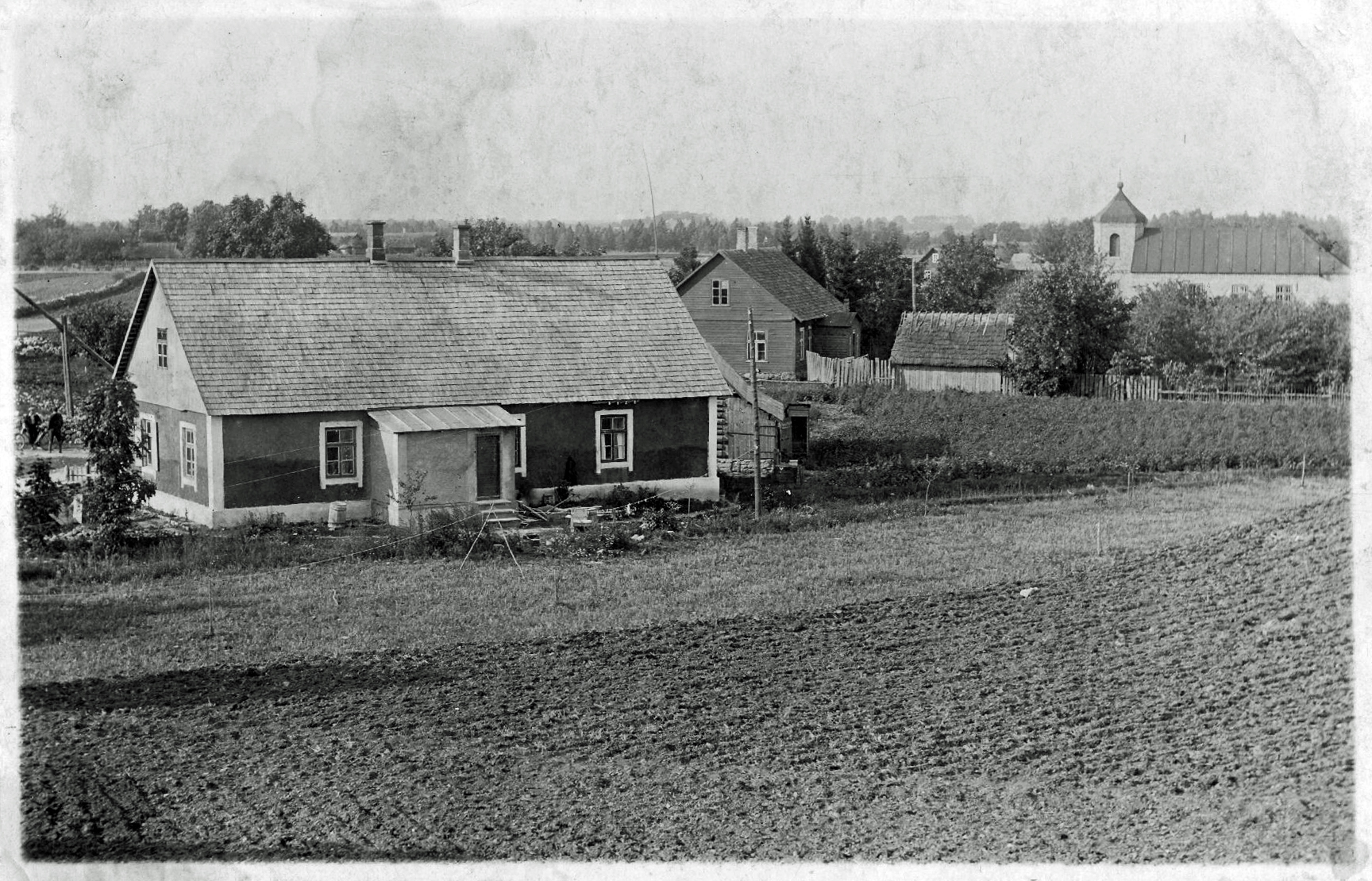
Village in the 1920s

Pärsama is a village in Saaremaa Parish, Saare County in western Estonia. Before the administrative reform in 2017, the village was in Leisi Parish.

== Notable people ==
Notable people that were born in Pärsama include:

- Melanie Rauk (1905–1978), teacher and translator
