= Muraka Bog =

Bog in Estonia

Coordinates: 59°09′07″N 27°04′58″E

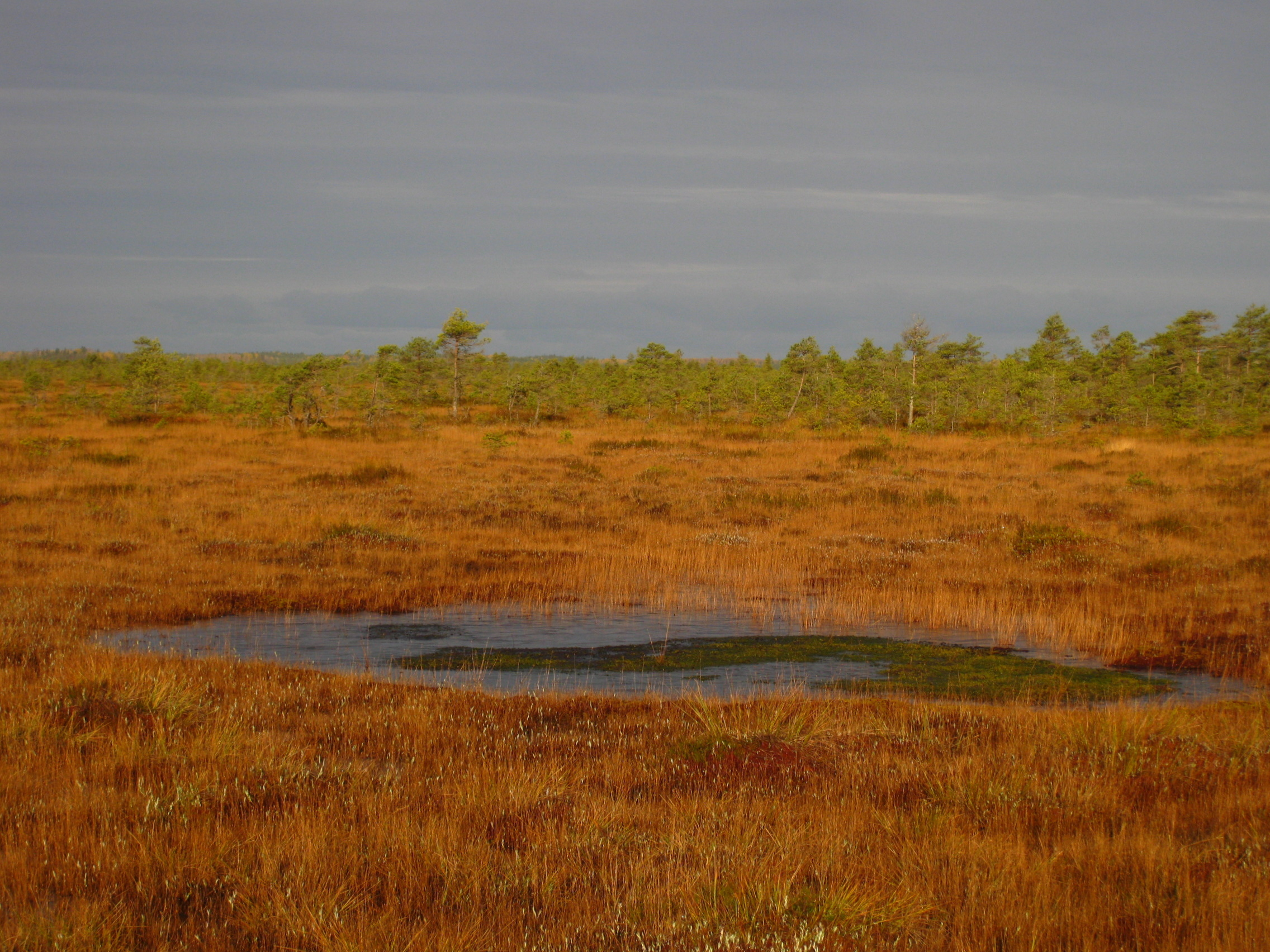
Muraka Bog

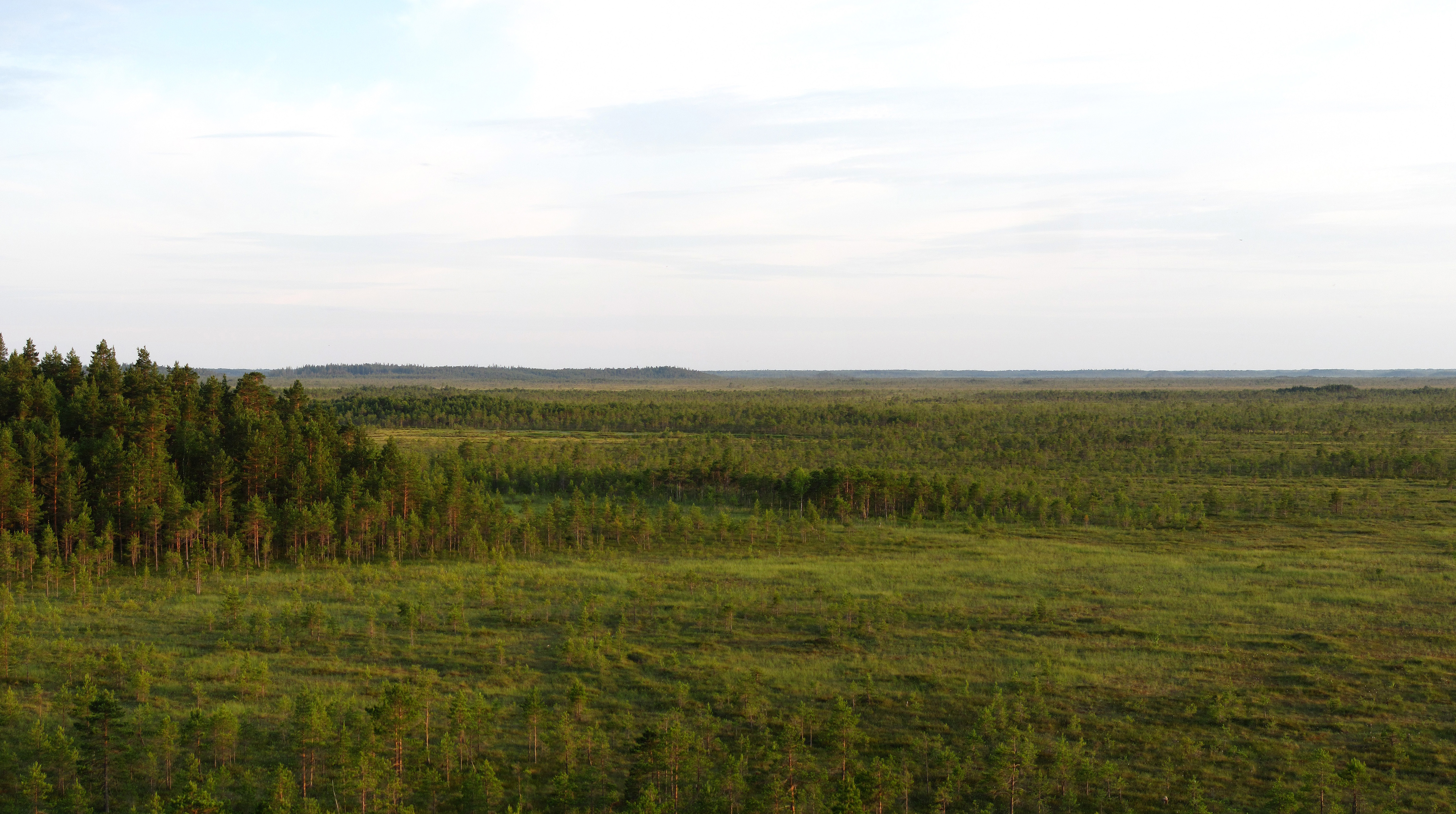
Muraka Bog

Muraka Bog (also Muraka Wetland Complex, Estonian: Muraka soostik) is a bog in Ida-Viru County, Estonia.

The area of the complex is 12,793 ha.

The complex consists of four bogs: Muraka, Ratva, Seli and Virunurme Bog.
