= Endla Wetland Complex =

Wetland complex in Estonia

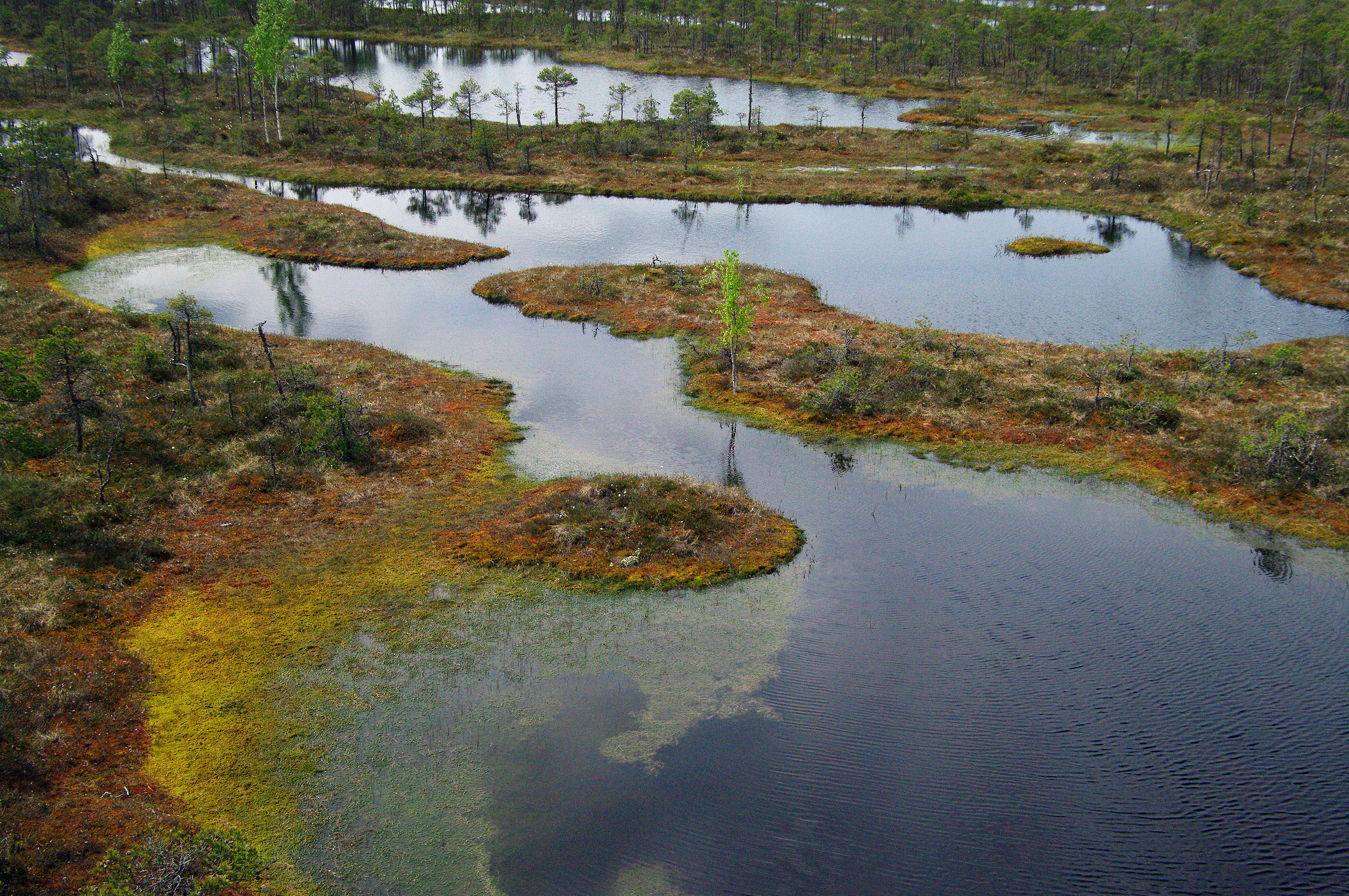
Endla Bog on May

Endla Wetland Complex (Estonian: Endla soostik) is a wetland complex in Jõgeva County, Estonia. This complex is one of the biggest wetland massive in Estonia.

The area of the complex is 25,100 ha.

Part of the complex is under protection (Endla Nature Reserve).
