= Orkjärve Nature Reserve =

Protected area in Estonia

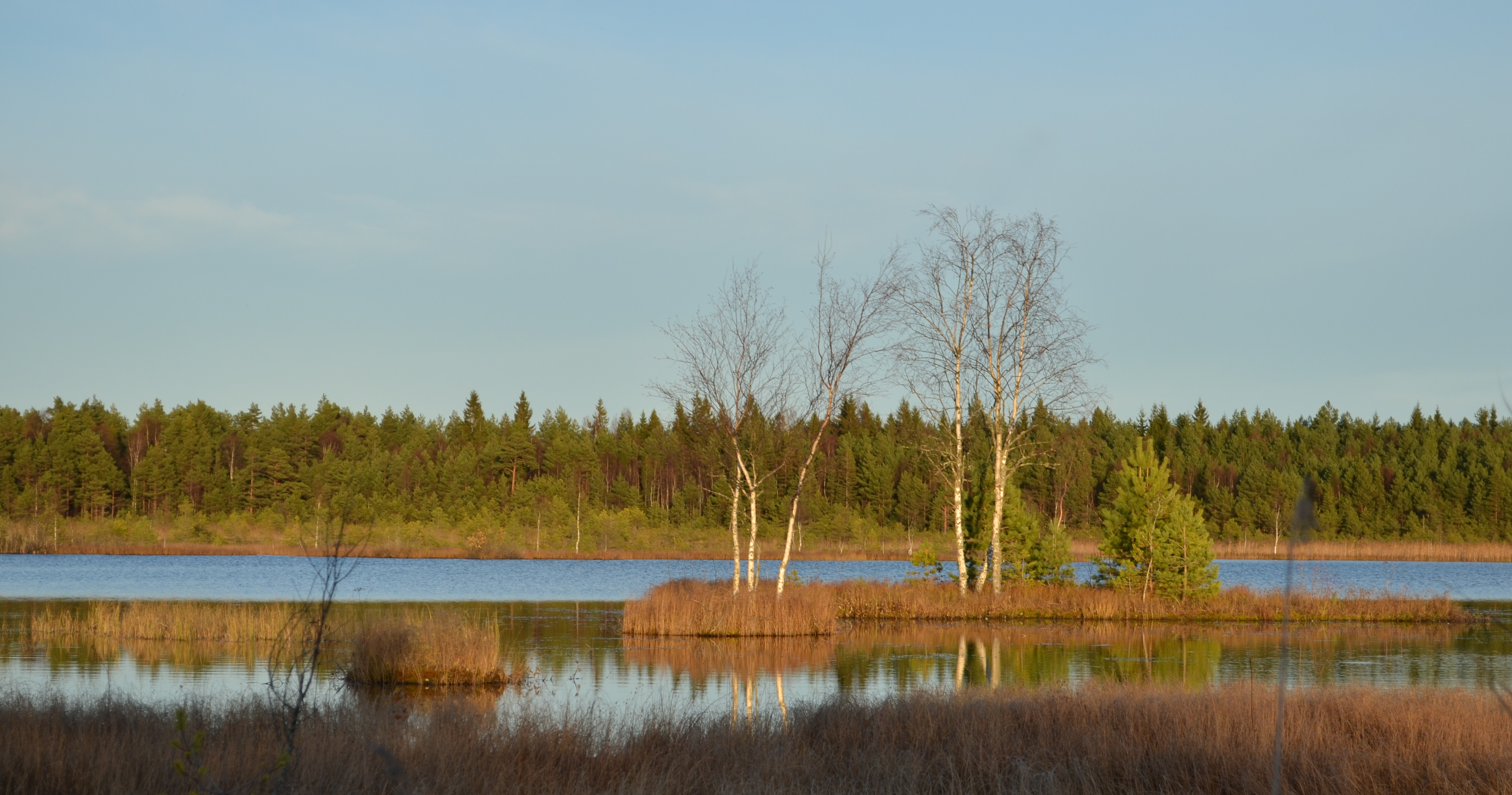

- Location within Estonia
- Location: Estonia
- Nearest city: Tallinn
- Coordinates: 59°08′30″N 24°13′24″E
- Area: 1,145.7 ha (2,831 acres)
- Established: 2005

Orkjärve Nature Reserve original name is “Orkjärve looduskaitseala”. It was established to protect Orkjärve Bog and Aude and Viisu mires. It's a terrestrial and inland waters protected areas.

== Location and Founded year ==
Orkjarve is a nature reserve situated in northern Estonia, in Harju County and it encompasses an area of 11.55 km². It was established in 2005.

== Key features ==
Most of the protected area is under Orkjärve Bog. In the northern part of this bog, there is Lake Laanemaa (also known as Orkjärv). Aude and Viisu mires are also part of the protected areas, and also have ecological importance. Peat deposit is up to 3.5 metres (11 ft).

== Management ==
Managed by the Ministry of Environment, Narva Mnt 7a, Tallinn, Estonia.

== Biodiversity ==
Smaller plant communities in the area include western boreal and montane birch forests, along with fen and swamp forests. Additionally, ombrotrophic mires are found in northern regions, characterized by nutrient-poor environments. Bogs and fens in the nature reserve are key examples of peat-forming ecosystems.

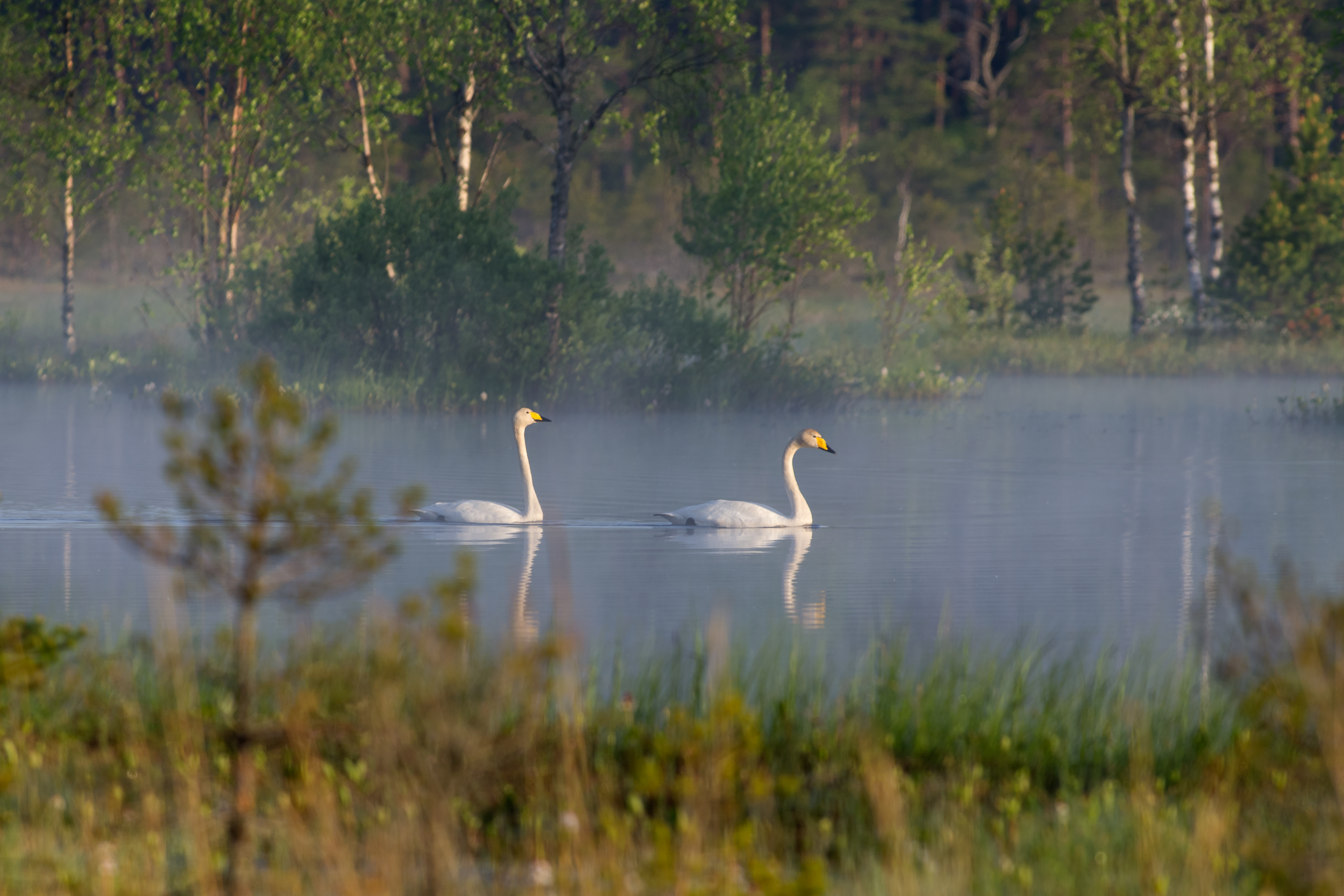
Cygnus cygnus

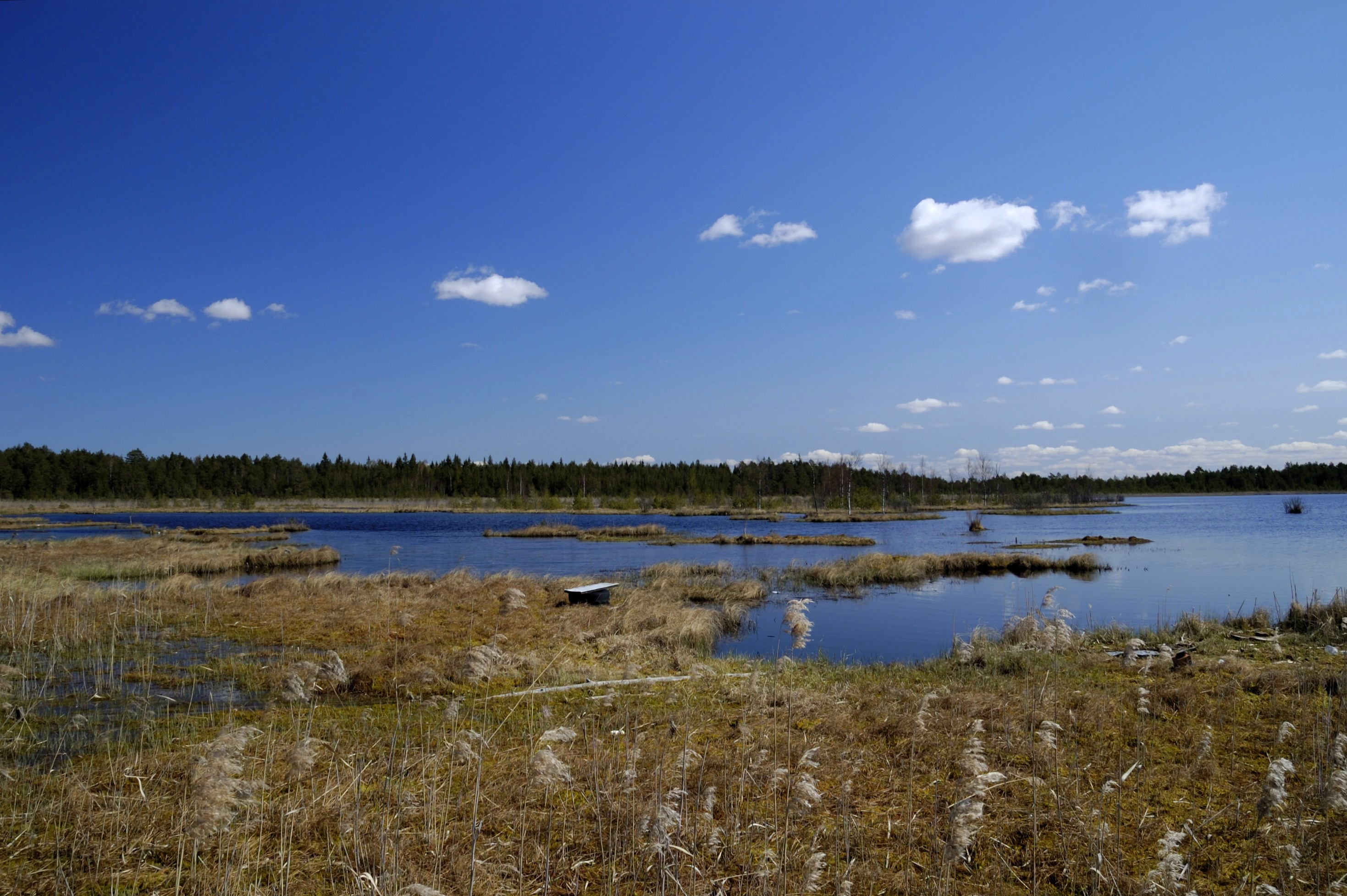
Lake Laanemaa

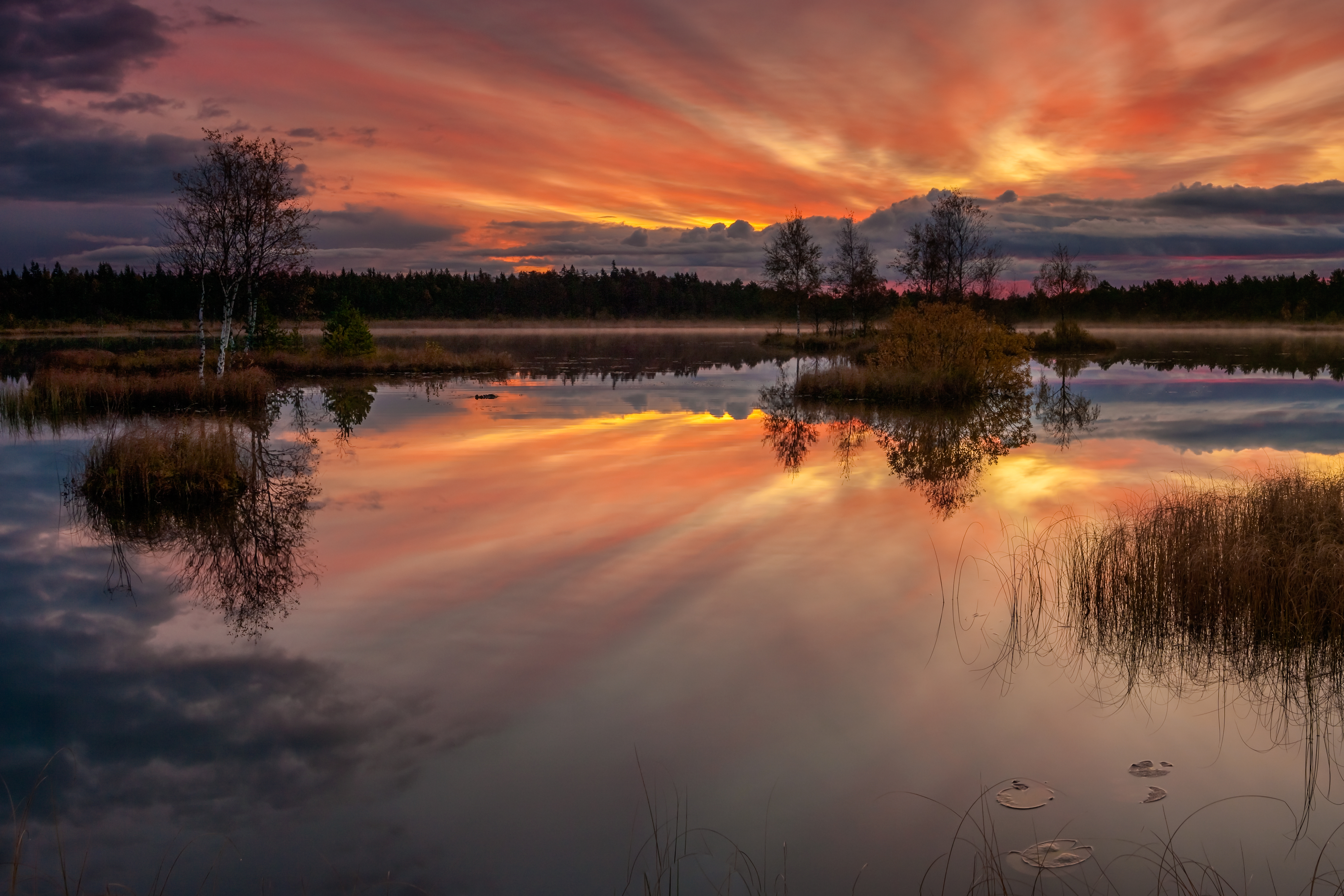
Lake Laanemaa (Orkjärv) at sunrise
