= Peedla Wetland Complex =

Wetland complex in Estonia

Peedla Wetland Complex (Estonian: Peedla soostik) is a wetland complex in Lääne-Viru County, Estonia. This complex is one of the biggest wetlands in Estonia.

The area of the complex is 15,500 ha.
