= Mäeküla piimamees =

1916 novel by Eduard Vilde

Milkman of the Manor
- Cover of 1947 published version.
- Author: Eduard Vilde
- Original title: Mäeküla piimamees
- Translator: Melanie Rauk
- Language: Estonian
- Publication place: Estonia

Mäeküla piimamees (The Dairyman of Mäeküla) is a novel by the Estonian author Eduard Vilde. It was first published in 1916. It was translated into English as Milkman of the Manor by Melanie Rauk in 1976.

Most of the information given about Mäeküla Manor, the location of Mäeküla piimamehe, corresponds to Karjaküla Manor in Keila Parish at the time, which a large part of the characters in the novel are based on. Vilde's parents worked at this manor, and Vilde himself visited them several times, staying there for long periods in 1882–1883, 1886–1887, and 1892–1893. During those visits, Vilde got to know the life and situation there in detail.
