= Lavassaare Wetland Complex =

Wetland complex in Estonia

Lavassaare Wetland Complex (Estonian: Lavassaare soostik) is a wetland complex in Pärnu County, Estonia. This complex is one of the biggest wetland massive in Estonia.

The area of the complex is 37,800 ha.
