= Ants Eskola =

Estonian actor and singer

- Born: February 17, 1908; Tallinn, Governorate of Estonia, Russian Empire
- Died: December 14, 1989 (aged 81); Tallinn, then part of Estonian SSR, Soviet Union
- Other name: Erhard-Voldemar Esperk
- Occupations: Actor, singer

Ants Eskola (17 February 1908 – 14 December 1989, known until 1935 as Erhard-Voldemar Esperk) was an Estonian actor, singer and artist. He appeared in 25 films from 1930 to 1979. People's Artist of the USSR (1964). His younger brother was actor Olev Eskola.
