= A. H. Tammsaare =

Estonian writer

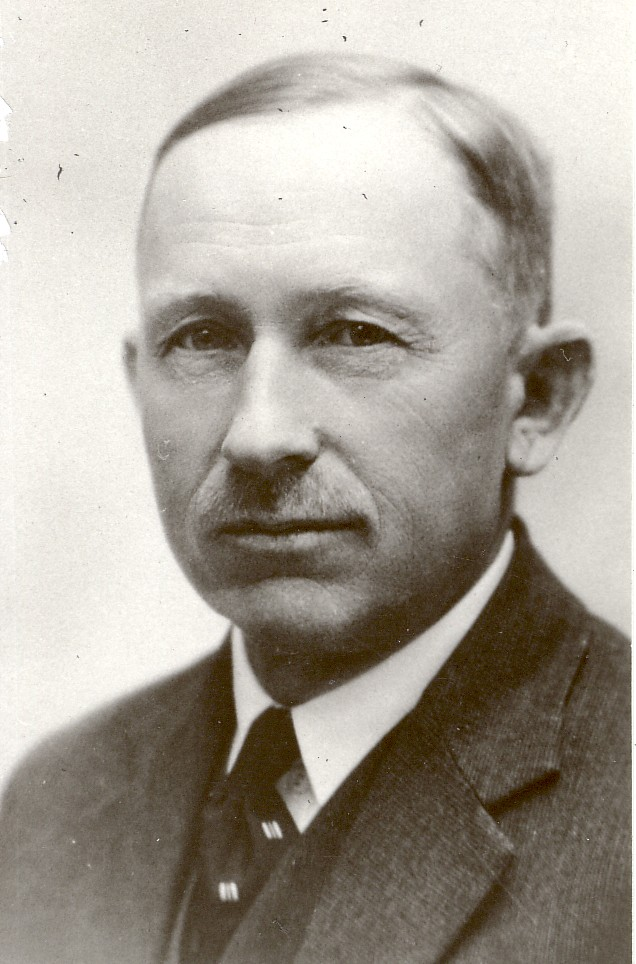
- Born: Anton Hansen; 30 January 1878; Vetepere, Governorate of Estonia, Russian Empire
- Died: 1 March 1940 (aged 62); Tallinn, Estonia
- Other name: A. H. Tammsaare
- Education: University of Tartu
- Occupation: Novelist
- Years active: 1900–1940
- Spouse: Käthe-Amalie Veltman (m. 1920)
- Children: Riita Hansen; Eerik Hansen

Anton Hansen (18 (O.S.)/30 January 1878 – 1 March 1940), better known by his pseudonym A. H. Tammsaare and its variants, was an Estonian writer whose pentalogy Truth and Justice (Tõde ja õigus; 1926–1933) is considered one of the major works of Estonian literature and "The Estonian Novel".

== Biography ==
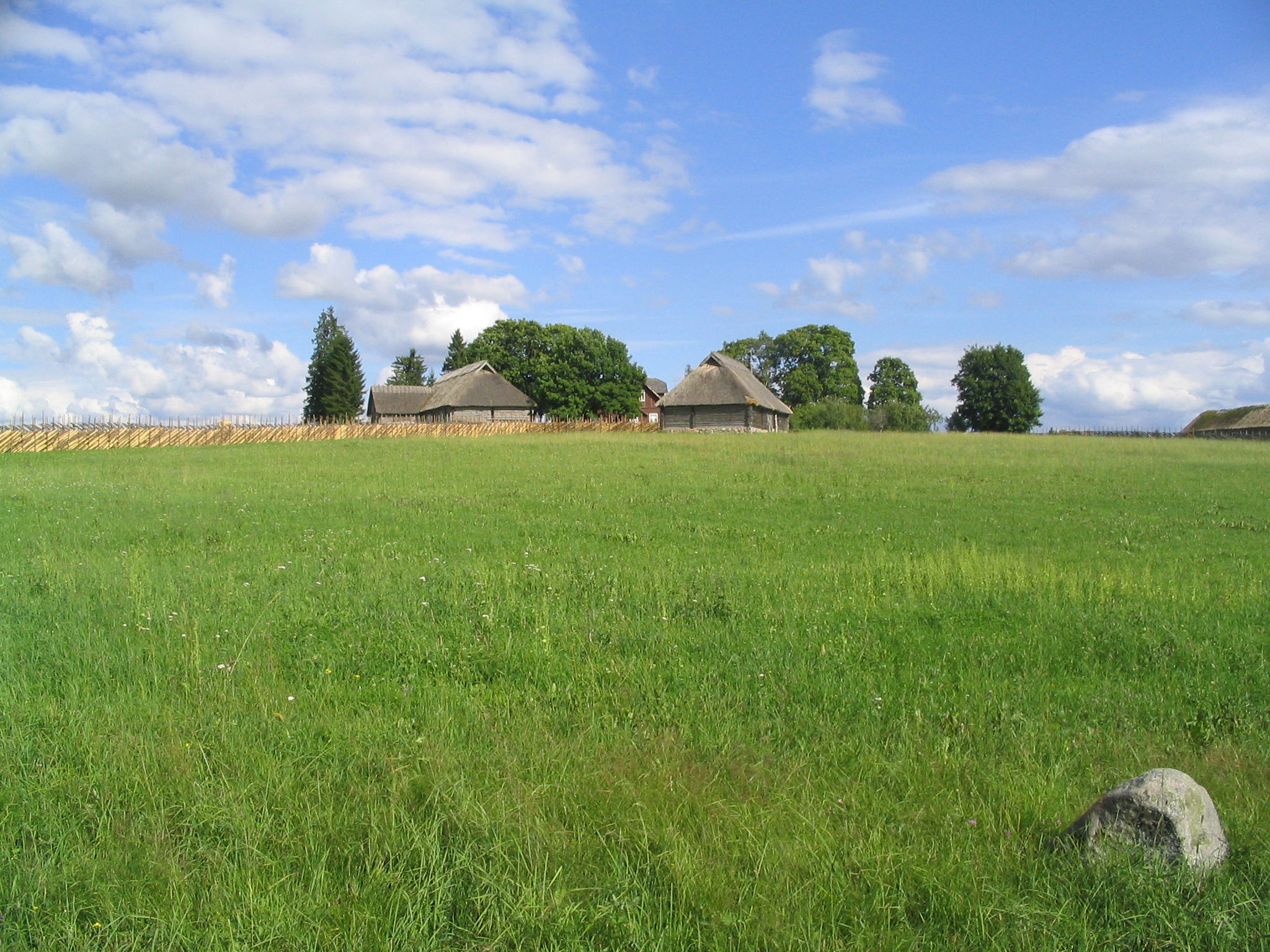
Birthplace of A. H. Tammsaare

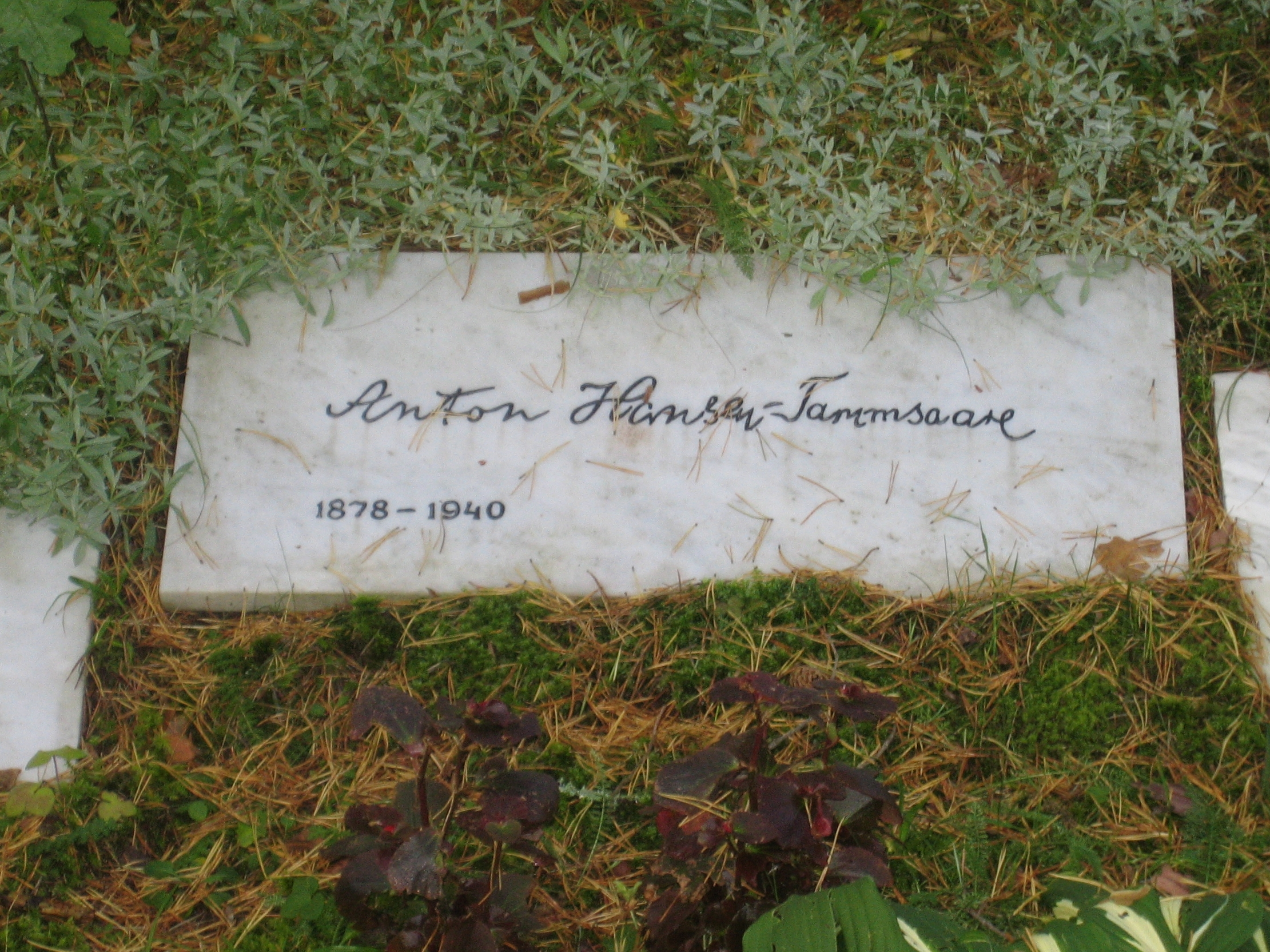
Grave of A. H. Tammsaare at Tallinn's Forest Cemetery

Tammsaare was born in Järva County, in the municipality of Albu, in the village of Vetepere, Estonia. The son of a farmer, he came from a poor background but managed to collect enough money for his education. His family was quite enlightened for the time, with his father ordering newspapers, which was something most Estonian farmers did not do. He studied in Väike-Maarja and Tartu at the Hugo Treffner Gymnasium, and afterward at the University of Tartu where he studied law. Tammsaare's studies were interrupted by tuberculosis in 1911. He spent over a year in a sanatorium in Sochi – where his museum house is open to the public – and the following six years in his brother's farm in Koitjärve, Estonia (now part of the Põhja-Kõrvemaa Nature Reserve), reading works of Cervantes, Shakespeare, and Homer. His younger sister, Maria Hansen, was the mother of Tammsaare's nephew, actor Arno Suurorg.

In 1918, when Estonia became independent, Tammsaare moved to Tallinn. It was here that Tammsaare wrote prose works based on the history and lives of the Estonian people that gained him a prominent place in Estonian literature.

Tammsaare was interested in philosophy and psychology. His novels reflect the ideas of Bergson, Jung and Freud. He was, however, skeptical about cosmopolitanism. "European culture" he wrote, "is something to be overcome if one wishes to see the triumph of love, justice, and humanity spoken of so glibly". Like Carl Robert Jakobson and Jaan Tõnisson's Tartu Renaissance group, he believed that Estonian culture was best served by farmers and intellectuals from rural backgrounds. His work was influenced at various stages by Oscar Wilde, Knut Hamsun and André Gide, while also the Russian realists. "In the whole of world literature," said Tammsaare, I have never read anything to compare to the Russians... there is no one to compare to Tolstoy, Dostoevsky or Gogol"... Dostoevsky "really disturbed me: I lived in a waking dream under his influence. I was especially gripped by Crime and Punishment.

== Bibliography ==
Tammsaare's early works are characterized by rural "poetic" realism. Some of his stories also reflect the atmosphere of the revolutionary year of 1905. During what is sometimes classified as his second period, from 1908 to 1919, he wrote several short urban novels and collections of miniatures. In "Poiss ja liblikas" (1915, The Boy and the Butterfly), Tammsaare shows the influence of Oscar Wilde. Internationally best known is his last novel, Devil with a False Passport ("Põrgupõhja uus Vanapagan").

Truth and Justice comprises five volumes, which have no individual titles (some were added in translation). Since vol. 3 contains a description about the Russian Revolution of 1905, which is not informed by ideology but by an existential attention to individual suffering, it was often combined with vol. 2 by Soviet censorship.

Even today, the third volume is sometimes called "artistically inferior", although the description of the revolution is on par with similar scenes in Pasternak's Doctor Zhivago. In Estonia, the second volume, with its Tartu educational scenes, is today probably the most enjoyed. International critics would probably opt for vol. 1 as the strongest overall; it is a classical peasant novel reminiscent of Hamsun which is also generally held to be the most telling one about "the Estonian character", embodied especially in two antagonistic farmer figures Andres and Pearu. Tammsaare himself said later that the different volumes deal with the relation of Man (i.e., the human person) to (1) the land, (2) God, (3) State and society, (4) him- or herself and (5) resignation.

Truth and Justice was not translated into English until 2014, when Haute Culture Books published the first volume of the saga under the name "Andres and Pearu". There are two complete translations into German and one each into French, Latvian, and Czech. Volume 1 has also been translated into Finnish, Polish, and Hungarian (with the title, Orcád verítékével). A new English translation is in progress with Vagabond Voices who have published Volumes 1 to 4 to date.

== Selected works ==
- 1902: Kaks paari ja üksainus (Two Pairs and the Only One)
- 1903: Vanad ja noored (Old Ones and Young Ones)
- 1907: Raha-auk (The Money-Hole)
- 1907: Uurimisel (Be in Prospect)
- 1908: Pikad sammud (Long Steps)
- 1909: Noored hinged (Young Spirits)
- 1910: Üle piiri (Over the Border)
- 1915: Kärbes (The Fly)
- 1915: Keelest ja luulest (About Language and Poetry)
- 1915: Poiss ja liblikas (The Boy and the Butterfly)
- 1917: Varjundid (The Shapes of the Shadows)
- 1919: Sõjamõtted (Thoughts of War)
- 1921: Juudit (Judith)
- 1922: Kõrboja peremees (The Master of Kõrboja)
- 1923: Pöialpoiss (Tom Thumb)
- 1924: Sic Transit
- 1926–1933: Tõde ja õigus I–V (Truth and Justice, vols. 1–5)
- 1932: Meie rebane (Our Fox)
- 1934: Elu ja armastus (Life and Love)
- 1935: Ma armastasin sakslast (I Loved a German)
- 1936: Kuningal on külm (The King Is Cold)
- 1938: Hiina ja hiinlane (China and a Chinese)
- 1939: Põrgupõhja uus Vanapagan (The Misadventures of the New Satan / Devil with a False Passport; literally, The New Devil of Hellsbottom)
- 1977: Miniatures
- 1977–1993: Kogutud teosed, 18 vols. (Collected Works)

== Legacy ==
Tammsaare's name was used for the Anton Tammsaare, an 84-meter (276 ft) Soviet fishing vessel commissioned in 1962. The vessel attracted attention in 1976, when it was seized in the United States for illegal lobster fishing. The ship was detained again in 1978 in the UK in connection with a collision in the North Sea.

== See also ==
- Lydia Koidula
