= Kakerdaja Bog =

Bog in Estonia

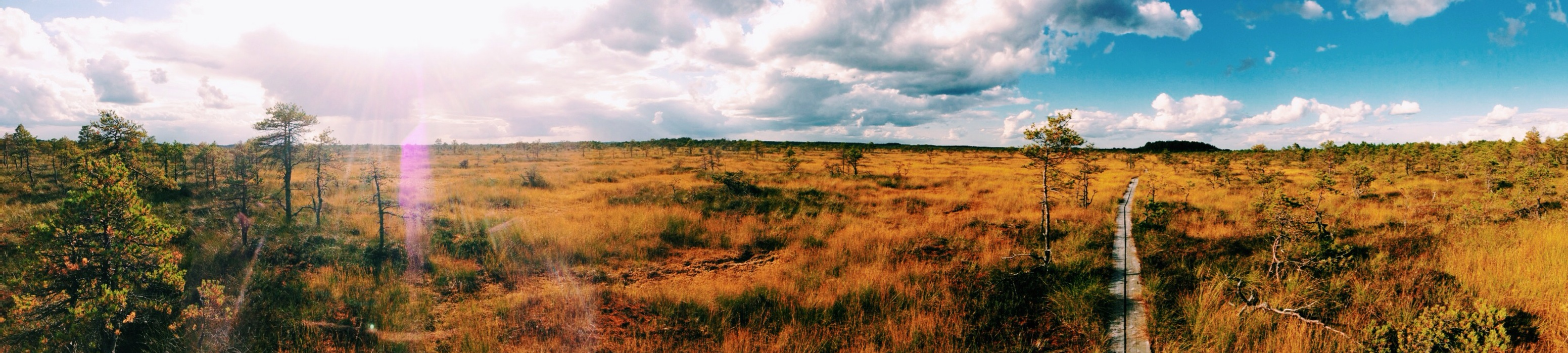
Kakerdaja Bog

Drone video of Kakerdaja Bog and Kakerdi lake in september 2021

Drone video of Kakerdaja Bog

Kakerdaja Bog is a bog in Järva County, Estonia. This bog is part of Epu-Kakerdi Wetland Massive (Estonian: Epu-Kakerdi soostik).

The area of the bog is about 1000 ha.

== Gallery ==
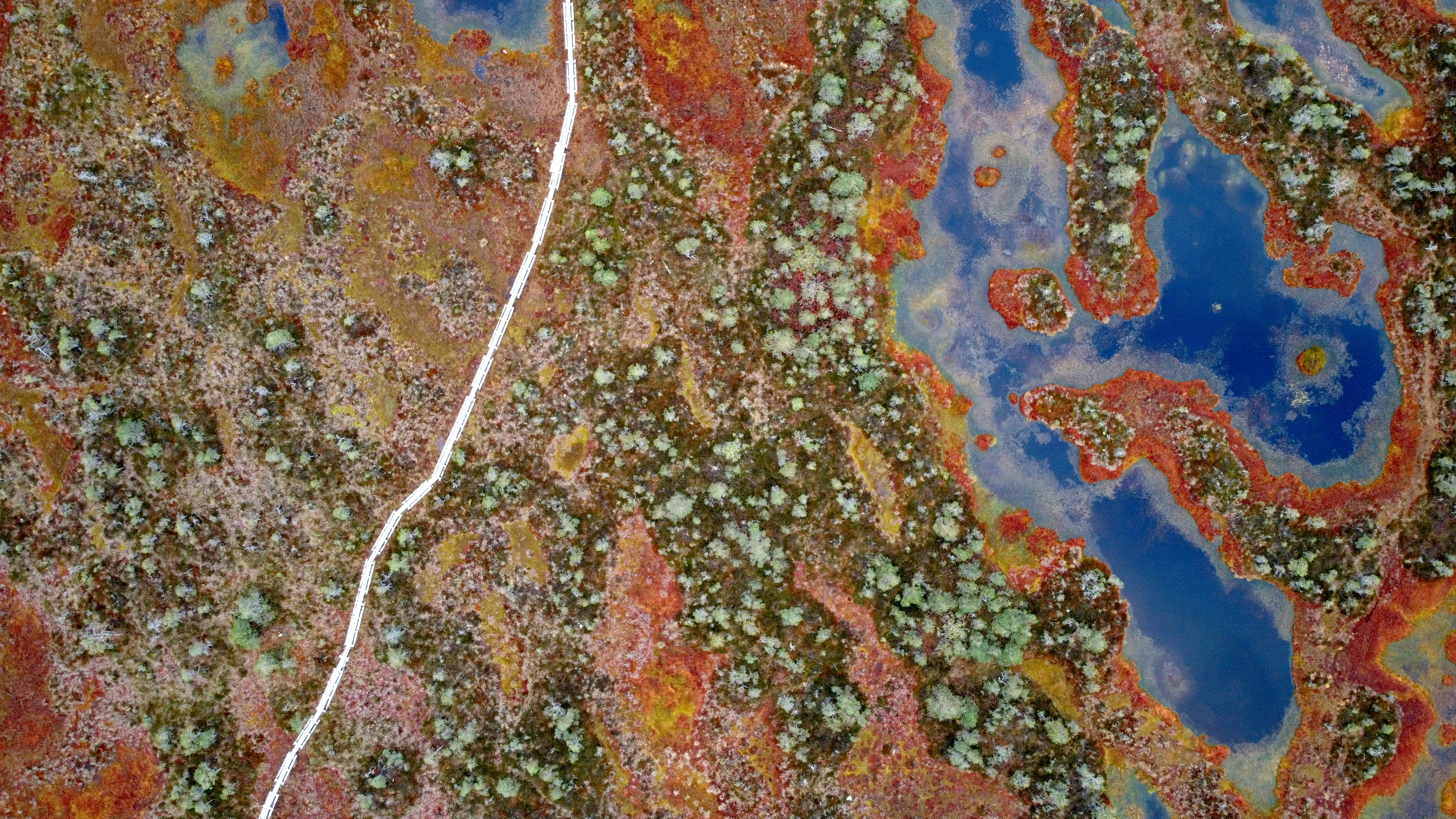
Aerial view of Kakerdaja bog and Oandu-Ikla hiking trail

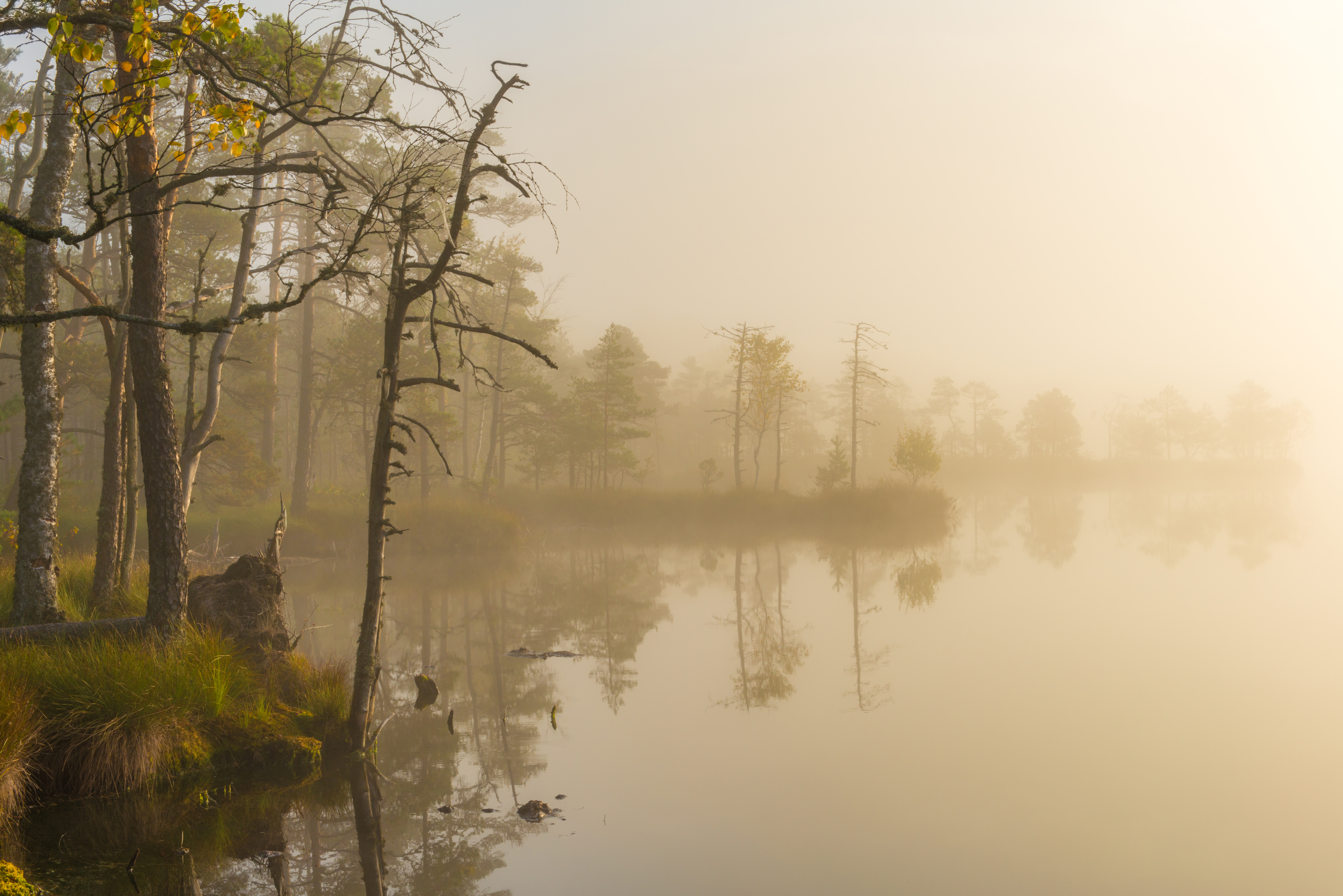
Morning fog in Kakerdaja bog

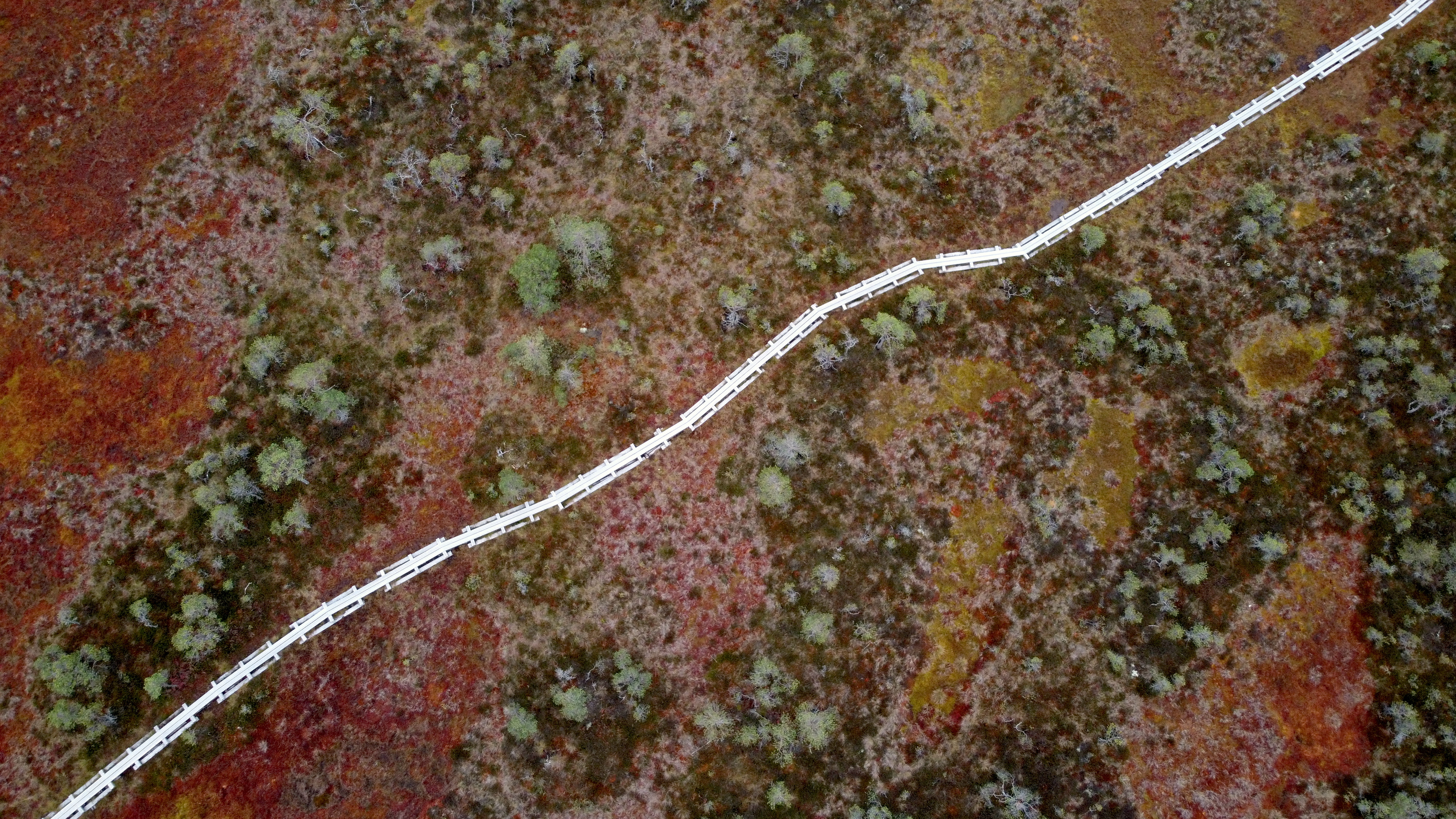
Hiking trail in Kakerdaja bog, september 2021

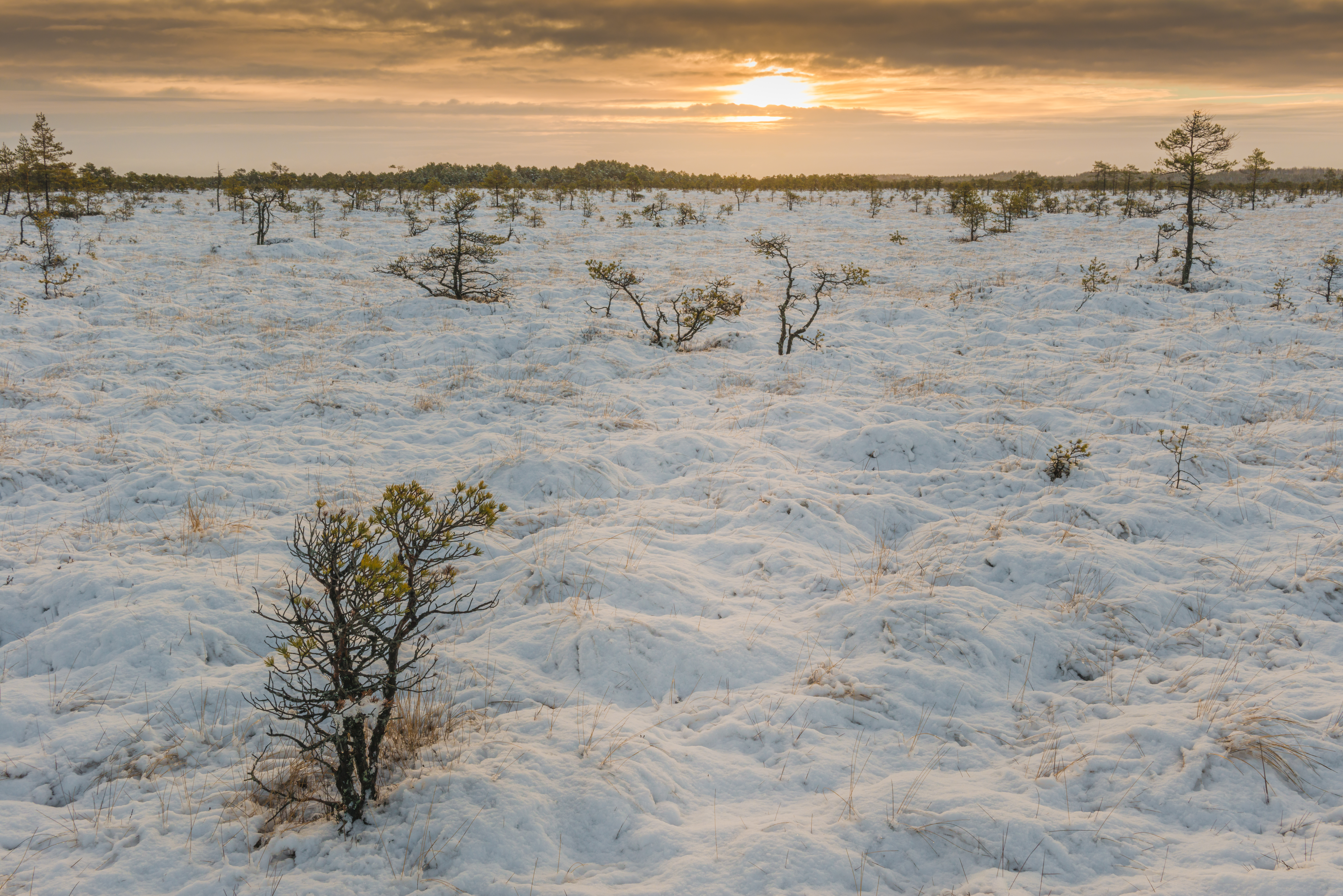
Winter in Kakerdaja

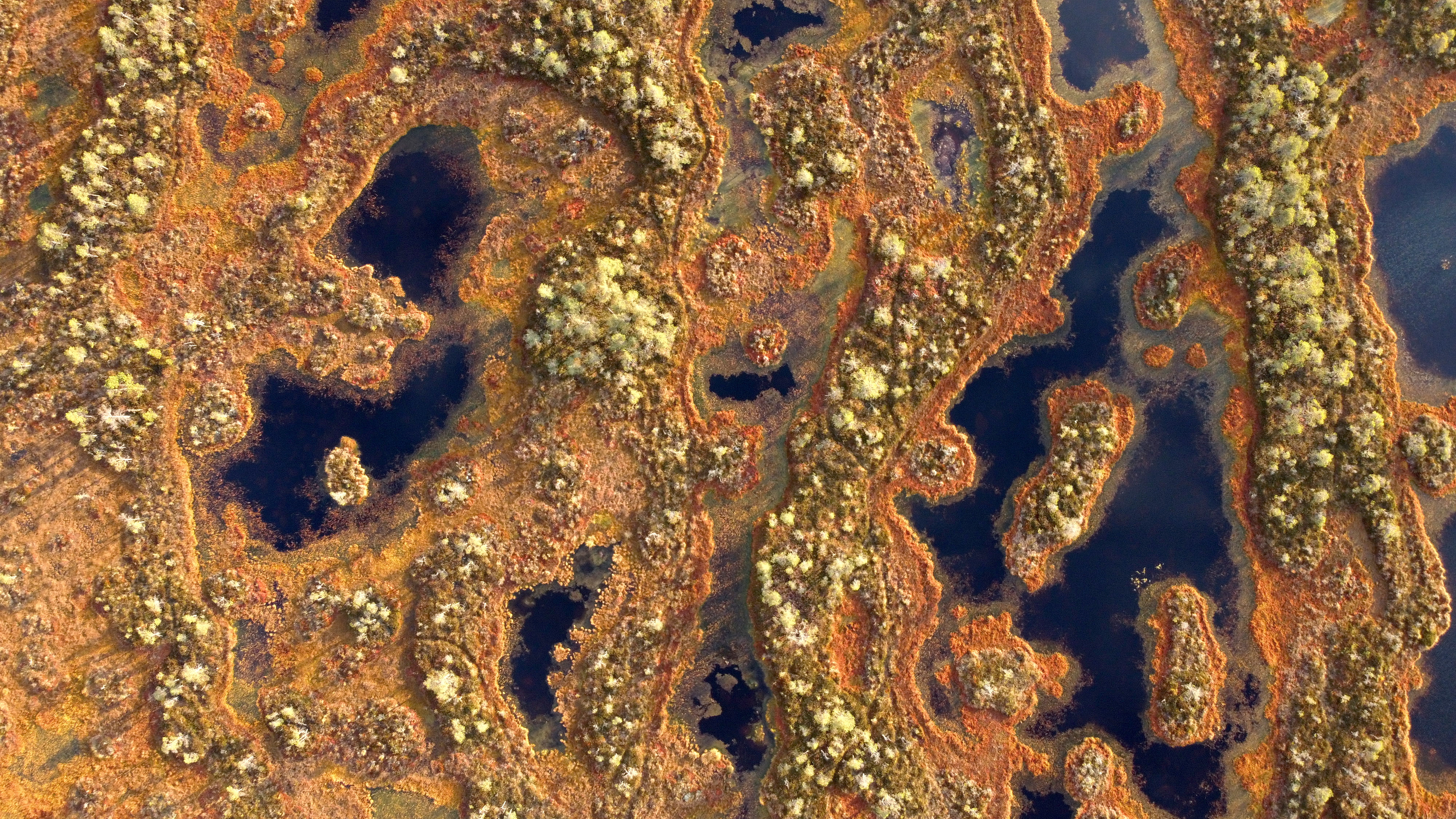
Hollows in Kakerdaja bog

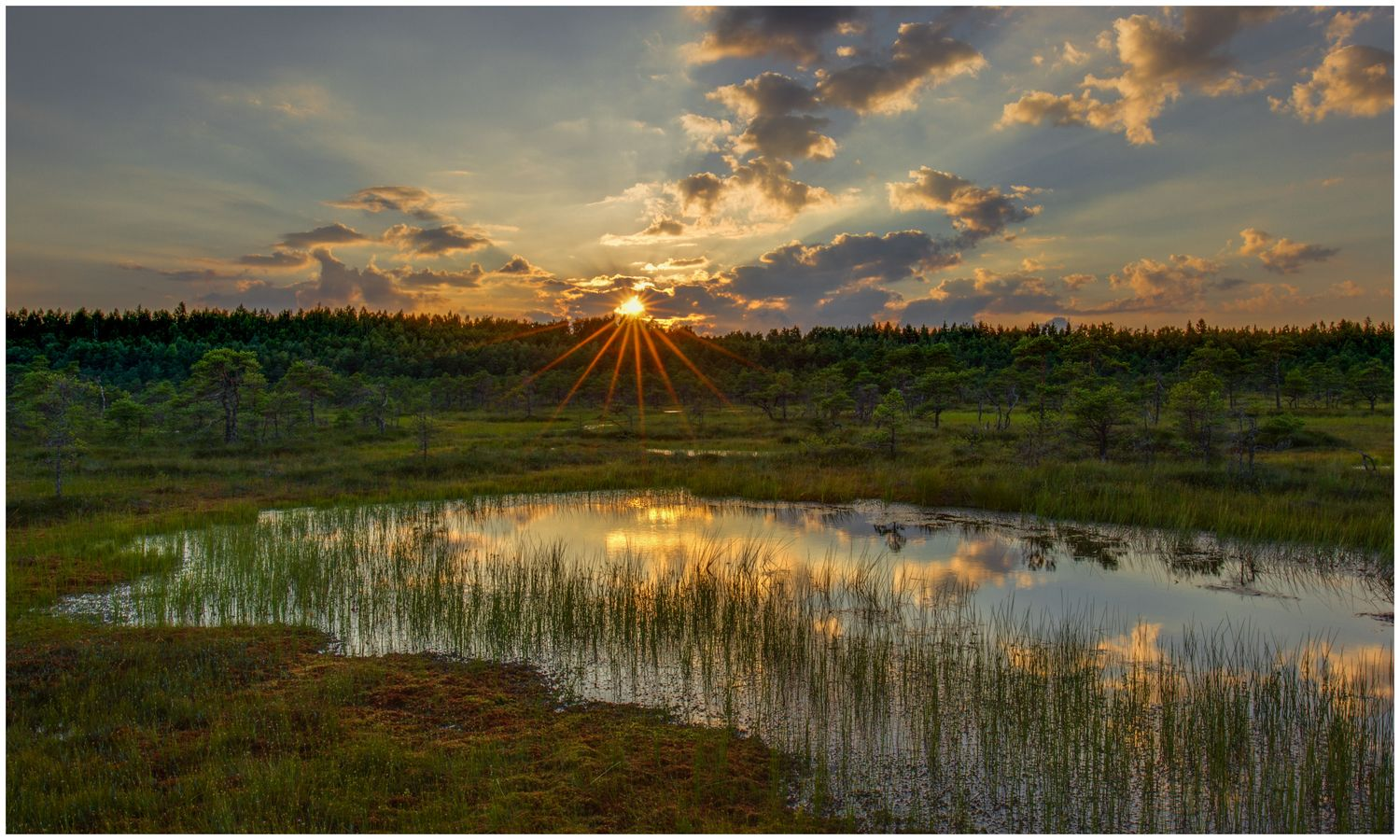
Sunset in Kakerdaja bog
