= Estonian literature =

Estonian literature (Estonian: eesti kirjandus) is literature written in the Estonian language (c. 1,100,000 speakers)

The oldest records of written Estonian date from the 13th century. Originates Livoniae in Chronicle of Henry of Livonia contains Estonian place names, words and fragments of sentences. The Liber Census Daniae (1241) contains Estonian place and family names. While sporadic Estonian names and words exist within otherwise Latin and Low German documentation of Hanseatic Tallinn, some of the earliest surviving samples of handwritten connected Estonian originate from the Dominican St. Catherine's Monastery, Tallinn during the 15th century. The earliest longer manuscript in Estonian consists of the so-called Kullamaa prayers dating from 1524 and 1528.

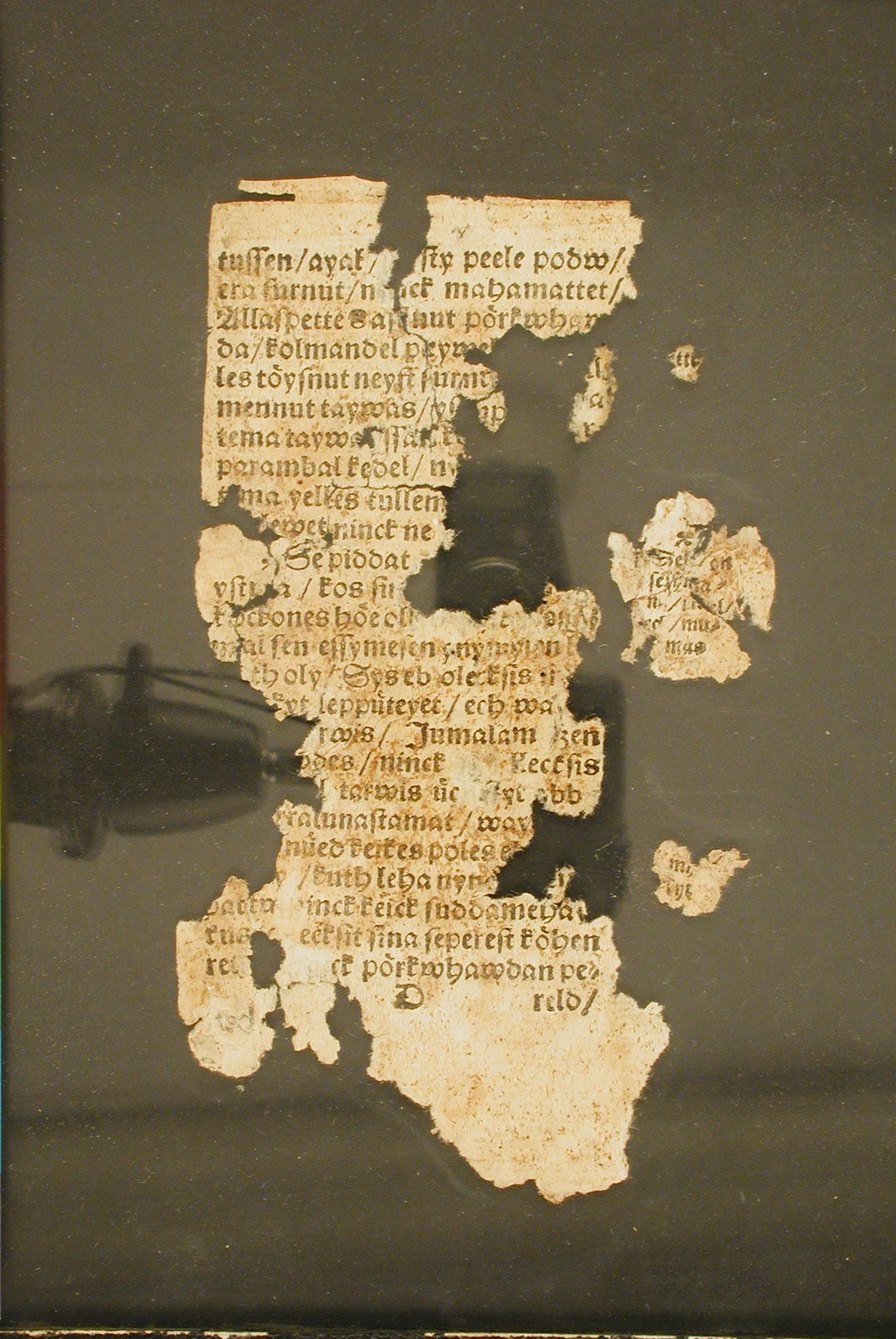
Fragment of the Wanradt–Koell Catechism (1535), the oldest book printed in Estonian

With the Reformation and advent of the printing press, the use of written Estonian became more widespread. The first known instance of a printed book in Estonian dates from 1525, while the oldest surviving printed book is a bilingual German–Estonian translation of the Lutheran catechism (Wanradt–Koell Catechism) by Simon Wanradt and Johann Koell (1535). For the use of priests an Estonian grammar was printed in German in 1637. The New Testament was translated into South Estonian in 1686, and to North Estonian in 1715. The entire Bible was translated to North Estonian by Anton Thor Helle in 1739. Writings in Estonian became more significant and numerous during the Estophile Enlightenment Period (1750–1840).

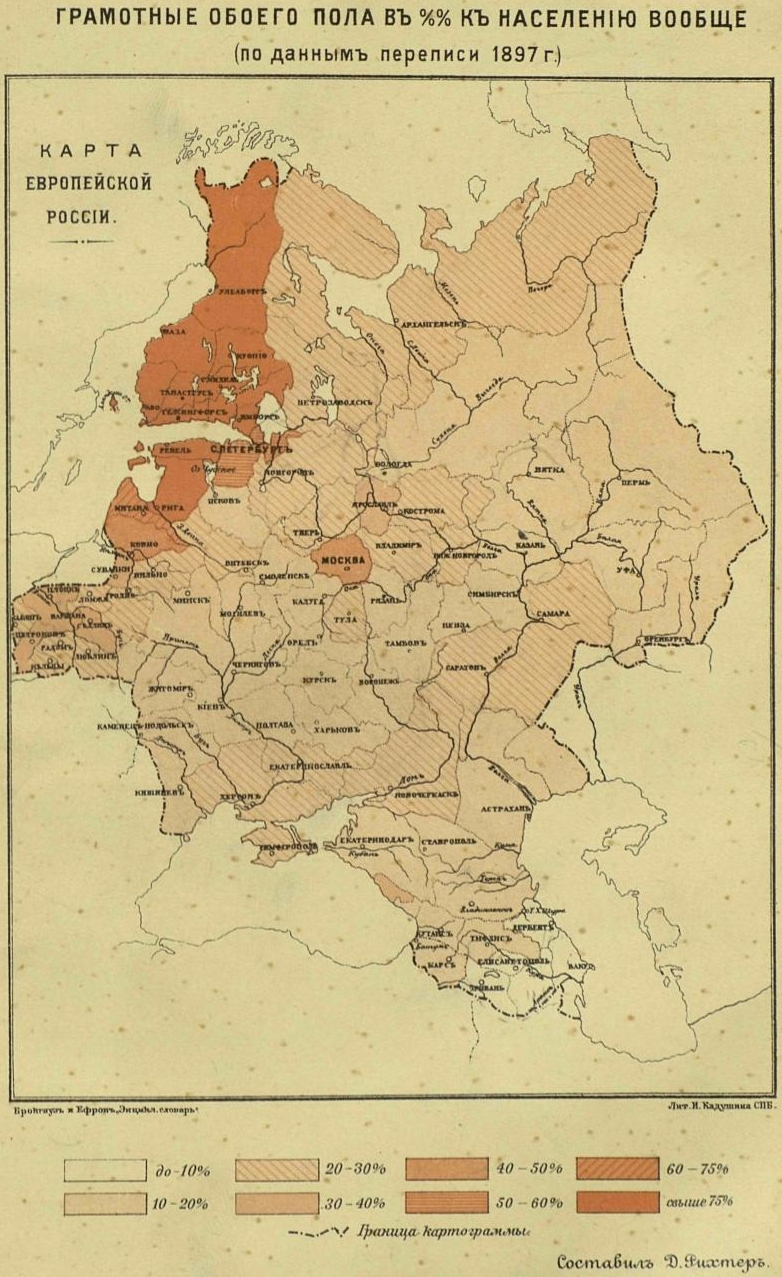
Public education systems founded during prior Swedish rule made Estonia and Finland the two most literate areas of Russian Empire (map of 1897 census literacy data)

The cultural stratum of Estonian was originally characterised by a largely lyrical form of folk poetry based on syllabic quantity. Apart from a few albeit remarkable exceptions, this archaic form has not been much employed in later times. The most outstanding achievements in this field are the national epic Kalevipoeg (Son of Kalev), written by Friedrich Reinhold Kreutzwald (1803–1882); Gustav Suits's ballad Lapse sünd (Birth of a Child); Villem Grünthal-Ridala's (1885–1942) poem Toomas ja Mai (Toomas and Mai) and three poems by August Annist (1899–1972). At a professional level, traditional folk song reached its new heyday during the last quarter of the 20th century, primarily thanks to the work of composer Veljo Tormis.

In modern times, A. H. Tammsaare (1878–1940), Jaan Kross (1920–2007), and Andrus Kivirähk (born 1970) remain Estonia's best known and most translated writers.

== History of Estonian literature ==
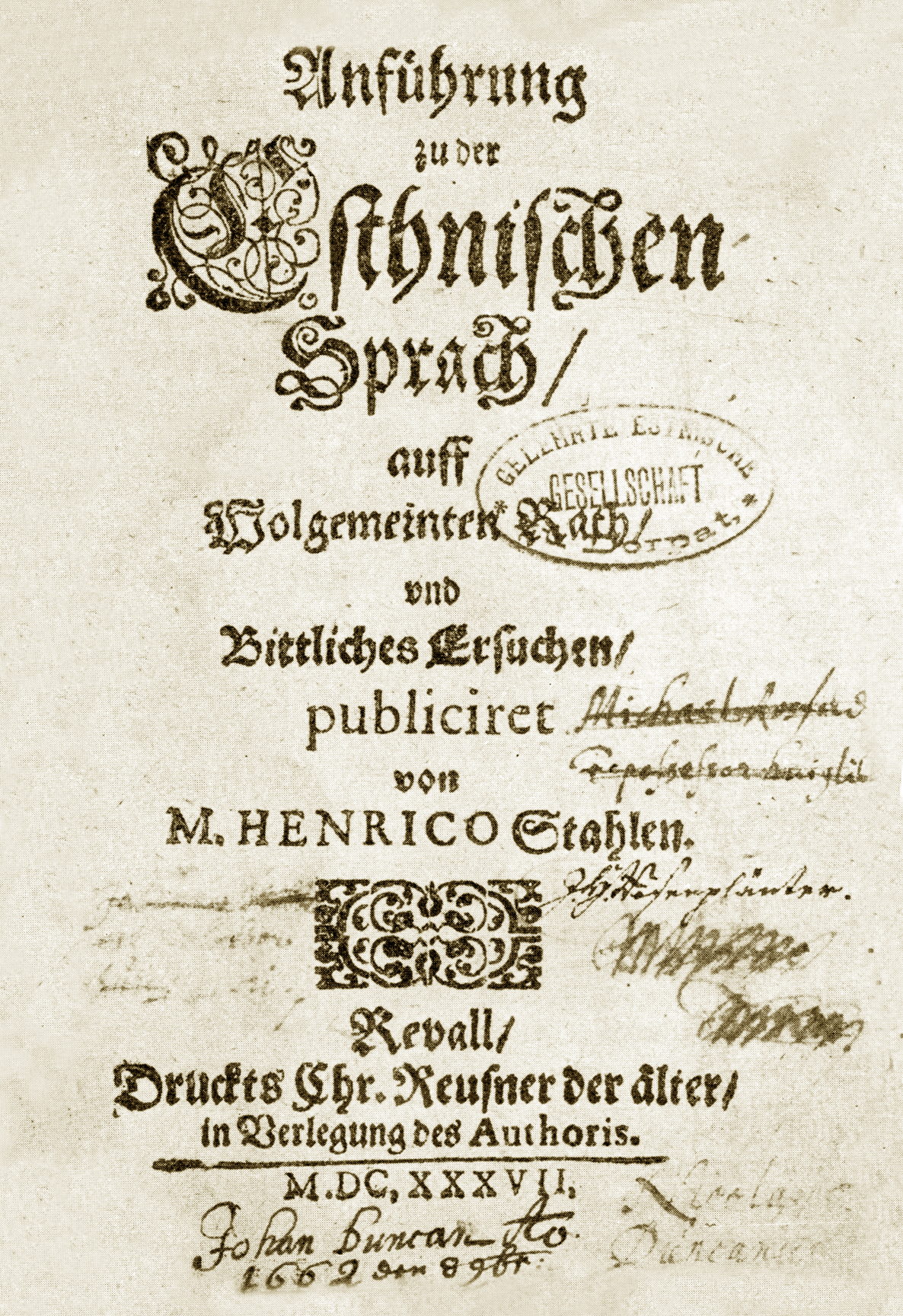
Estonian grammar (1637) by Heinrich Stahl

=== Folklore ===
As opposed to the recent nature of written literature, the oral tradition, found in collections of Estonian folklore, tells of the ancient pre–Northern Crusades period of independence. The first fragmentary records of Estonian folk poetry, dating from the 13th century, can be found in the Chronicle of Henry of Livonia; in the late 18th century Johann Gottfried von Herder published examples of Estonian folk songs in his anthology Volkslieder (1807). Jakob Hurt (1839–1907) was the first to start systematically collecting Estonian folklore in the second half of the 19th century, planning a multivolume series on Estonian folklore, called Monumenta Estoniae Antiquae. Hurt coined the phrase which to this day shapes the mentality of the nation of one million people: If we cannot be great in number, then we must be great in spirit.

=== Baltic Germans ===
Chronicles and theatrical performances by the Baltic German nobility formed the basis for local Baltic German literature which, despite the barriers of status and language, affected Estonian literature. The earliest example of Estonian language poetry dates back to 1637, a poem written by Reiner Brockmann (1609–1647), teacher of Greek at the Tallinn Gymnasium. Otto Wilhelm Masing (1763–1832) was the first literate who had a thorough mastery of the Estonian language. He published an Estonian-language alphabet book called ABD ehk Luggemise-Ramat Lastele in 1795.

=== Kristjan Jaak Peterson ===
Cannot the tongue of this land
In the fire of incantation
Rising up to the heavens
Seek for eternity?

Kristjan Jaak Peterson

Those lines have been interpreted as a claim to reestablish the birthright of the Estonian language. Kristjan Jaak Peterson (1801–1822) is considered the founder of modern Estonian poetry. He gathered his Estonian poems into two small books but never saw them published: this only occurred a hundred years after his death (although three German poems were published posthumously in 1823). One of Peterson's projects was fulfilled in his lifetime, the German version of Kristfrid Ganander's Mythologia Fennica, a dictionary of Finnish mythological words and names (the Swedish original was published in 1789). Peterson's translation of Ganander's dictionary found many readers in Estonia and abroad, becoming an important source of national ideology and inspiration for early Estonian literature. Its dominating influence extended through the first decades of the 20th century.

=== Kalevipoeg ===
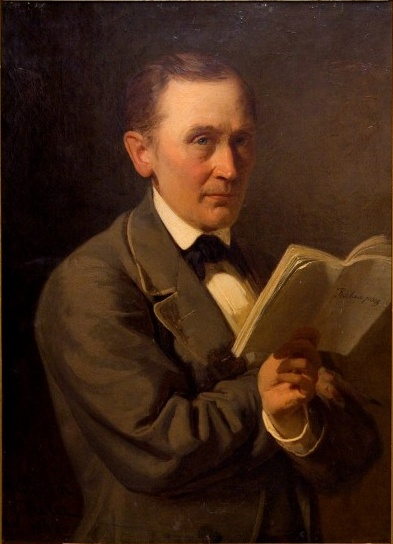
Friedrich Reinhold Kreutzwald

The outstanding achievements in folklore imitate the epics: the national epic Kalevipoeg was compiled by doctors of Estonian origin: Friedrich Robert Faehlmann began the epic and it was finished by Friedrich Reinhold Kreutzwald. The romantic ideology of the 19th century laid down the requirements for a national literature. The idea of an epic was the product of a humanist circle called the Learned Estonian Society (Gelehrte Estnische Gesellschaft), where Faehlmann had presented his paper in 1839 on a mythical hero called Kalewipoeg (Son of Kalew). After Faehlmann's death in 1850 the society handed the manuscripts over to Kreutzwald. The first edition of Kalevipoeg (1857–61) was bilingual, the German text being presented side by side with the Estonian original. A popular Estonian edition in a single volume followed in 1862.

Lydia Koidula (1843–1886) was the initiator of a tradition of Estonian patriotic and women's poetry during the era.

=== Late 19th early 20th century ===
In the late 19th century, a poet emerged who profoundly affected Estonian poetry as a whole – Juhan Liiv (1864–1913). During the last decade of the 19th century, a contemporary of Liiv's, Eduard Vilde (1865–1933), gave a realistic direction to Estonian prose.

With the formation of the group Noor-Eesti (Young Estonia) in 1905, led by the poet Gustav Suits (1883–1956), the linguist and poet Villem Grünthal-Ridala (1885–1942) and the reformer of the Estonian language Johannes Aavik (1880–1973), Estonian literature gained a new intellectual impetus. The most prominent prose writer of the time, still widely read today, was Oskar Luts (1887–1953). Another significant author was Jaan Oks (1884–1918).The poetry of Ernst Enno (1875–1934) gained popularity much later.

The rationality of the Young Estonians was counterbalanced by the group of writers from the Siuru movement, established in 1917. The central and peripheral poets of Siuru were: August Gailit (1891–1960), Friedebert Tuglas (1886–1971), Johannes Semper (1892–1970), Artur Adson (1889–1977), August Alle (1890–1952), Henrik Visnapuu (1890–1951), Peet Aren (1889–1970), Otto Krusten (1888–1937), and Marie Under (1883–1980).

The magazine Eesti Kirjandus (Estonian Literature) was founded in 1906, and Eesti Kirjanduse Selts (Estonian Literary Society) in 1907.

=== 1918–1940 ===
After the establishment of the Republic of Estonia, professionalism and diversity in literature were followed by the emergence of literary institutions. The Estonian Writers Union was founded in 1922; the literary monthly Looming (Creation) first appeared in 1923 and is still the main periodical of its sort in Estonia. The Cultural Endowment Fund started work in 1925 and is the major provider of grants in the arts in the present-day Republic of Estonia.

The prevailing tendency in prose writing between the two World Wars was realism. The most prominent writer of the era is A. H. Tammsaare (1878–1940). His five volume epic novel Tõde ja Õigus (Truth and Justice, 1926–1933) is considered one of the major works of Estonian literature. Other prominent prose writers were: Marta Sillaots (1887–1969), August Mälk (1900–1987), Karl Ristikivi (1912–1977). August Gailit appeared on the literary scene along with the Siuru group.

The Arbujad ("Soothsayers") was a small but influential group of poets who began collaborating in 1938 at the behest of poet and author Ants Oras (1900–1982) and included: Betti Alver (1906–1989), Uku Masing (1909–1985), Mart Raud (1903–1980), Kersti Merilaas (1913–1986), Bernard Kangro (1910–1994), Heiti Talvik (1904–1947), August Sang (1914–1969) and Paul Viiding (1904–1962). While group's poetic works tended to be eclectic, there was a common desire among members to reach a deeper intellectual and emotional plane. The Arbujad poets were for the freedom and independence of the people while being against ideological coercion and totalitarian concepts.

=== Post World War II ===
After the Second World War Estonian literature was split in two for almost half a century. A number of prominent writers who spent the war years in Estonia fled from Soviet forces to Germany in 1944 (Visnapuu) or to Sweden, either directly or via Finland (Suits, Under, Gailit, Kangro, Mälk, Ristikivi). Many of those who remained behind and did not follow the ideology of the Soviet occupying power suffered either death in Siberia (Talvik and playwright Hugo Raudsepp) or a combination of repression, a ban on publication and interior exile (Tuglas, Alver, Masing). Despite the modest circumstances of the war and post-war years, creative activity and publishing started almost immediately, both in the temporary stopovers in Finland, and in the refugee camps in Sweden and Germany.

==== In Exile ====
In 1945 the Estonian Writers' Union in Exile was founded in Stockholm. In 1950 Bernard Kangro began publishing the cultural magazine Tulimuld in Lund (published until 1993). Eesti Kirjanike Kooperatiiv, the largest Estonian-language publishing house in exile, was set up and its method of book distribution secured the continuity of literary life on an institutional level and on a global scale, except in the Soviet-controlled homeland. Estonians abroad also did their best to introduce Estonian literature to the world: in the US, Ivar Ivask (1927–1992) edited World Literature Today in which he published numerous articles and reviews about Estonian literature.

The poetry collection by surrealist Ilmar Laaban (1921–2000) was at first the only modernist work, until 1953 when Karl Ristikivi, essentially a conservative writer, published his novel The Night of the Souls. Arved Viirlaid's (1922) novel Seitse kohtupäeva (Seven Days of Trial, 1957) was a detour into modernism. Ilmar Jaks (1923) became a more consistent cultivator of the technique of the modern novel. The subject matter of literary output was greatly enriched by descriptions of the countries where various writers had settled, like Karl Rumor (1886–1971) in Brazil, or Gert Helbemäe (1913–1974) in England. In the second half of the 1950s Kalju Lepik (1920–1999) was a poet in exile who rose to prominence alongside Bernard Kangro. Kalju Lepik's first visit to his homeland in 1990 and the publication of his last collections of poetry there, symbolises the end of the split.

==== Behind the Iron Curtain ====
In Estonia a relaxation of the strictures of the Soviet regime after the death of Stalin opened the way for various Estonian writers: Minni Nurme (1917–1994), Jaan Kross (1920–2007) Artur Alliksaar (1923–1966), Ain Kaalep (1921–2020), Kersti Merilaas (1916–1986) and Ellen Niit (1928–2016). Against that background a new "Cassette Generation" emerged in 1962–1967 (so-called because of the small poetry chapbooks which appeared together in small cardboard boxes termed kassett in Estonian). Jaan Kaplinski (1941–2021) was greatly inspired by Oriental religion and nature. Other authors of note were Mats Traat (born 1936), Hando Runnel (born 1938), Viivi Luik (born 1946), Aimée Beekman (born 1933), Andres Ehin (1940–2011), and Ilmar Laaban (1921–2000).

The political stagnation that followed the crushing of the Prague Spring in 1968 was reflected in Paul-Eerik Rummo's initially banned minimalist collection. The collection did not appear in its entirety until 1989. So-called alternative literature was disseminated in manuscript form, the most significant authors in this field being the dissident poet Jaan Isotamm (pseudonym Johnny B. Isotamm, 1939–2014) and the prose writer Toomas Vint (born 1944). The most remarkable poet of the 1960s and 1970s was Juhan Viiding (pseudonym Jüri Üdi, 1948–1995, son of former Arbujad member, poet Paul Viiding), whose first collection Nerve Print appeared in 1971. Despite all attempts to ban it, the popular and song-like nature of Hando Runnel's patriotic verse secured its huge circulation. His collection The Purple of the Red Evenings, 1982 was allowed into print but the publication of any reviews in the press remained forbidden.

=== 1991–2001 ===
Republic of Estonia regained independence from the Soviet occupation in 1991. The two Estonian Writers' Unions were merged in 2000.

In a way, Emil Tode’s (pen name of Tõnu Õnnepalu, 1962) Piiririik ("Border State") marked the beginning of a new era in 1993. Border State raised the topic of "Euro-literature", where one of the central issues is the wanderings of Estonians abroad, their search for an identity in a world with open borders.

The intertextual poetry of Jaan Undusk (born 1958), Mati Unt and Viivi Luik and Hasso Krull (born 1964) prepared the ground for a bold new Estonian literature. The most remarkable prose writers of the younger generation who emerged in the end of 20th century were Andrus Kivirähk (born 1970), Karl-Martin Sinijärv (born 1971), Mehis Heinsaar (born 1973), Peeter Sauter (born 1962) and Jüri Ehlvest (1967–2006), who deepened the subjects and topics opened up by Õnnepalu in a way both comical and cryptic.

While Jaan Kross and Jaan Kaplinski remained Estonia's best known and most translated writers abroad, in the 1990s short stories of Eeva Park and the novels of Tõnu Õnnepalu and Ervin Õunapuu also enjoyed moderate success in Germany and Scandinavia.

Jaan Kross was tipped for the Nobel Prize for Literature on several occasions. On his return from the labour camps and internal exile in Russia, where he spent nine long years (1946–1954) as a political prisoner, Kross breathed new life into Estonian poetry. Kross began writing prose in the latter half of the 1960s. Jaan Kaplinski was the most productive Modernist in Estonian poetry; he wrote essays and plays, translated, lectured home and overseas and was Writer-in-Residence at the University of Wales, Aberystwyth.

=== The new century ===
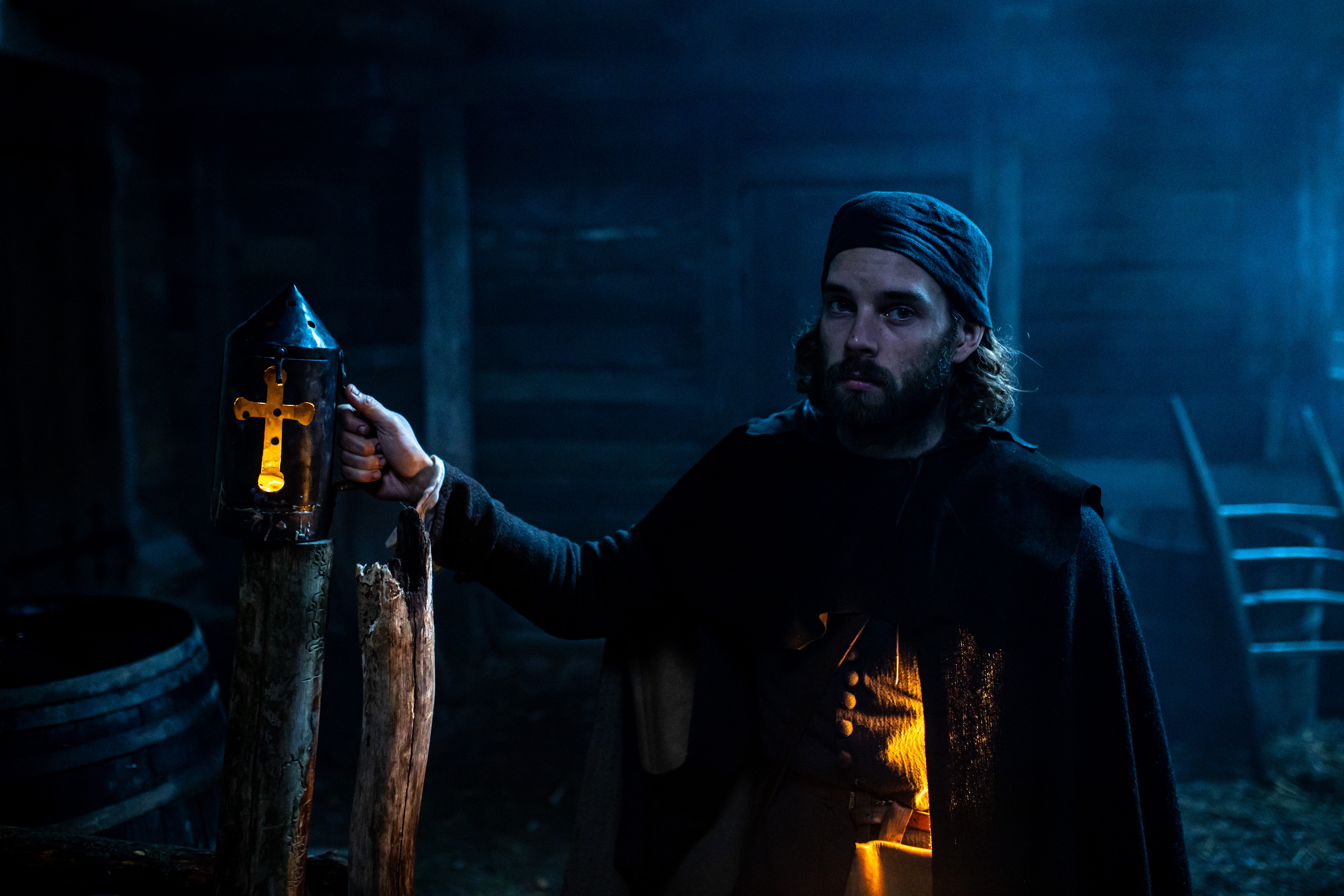
Indrek Hargla has created the Apothecary Melchior series, in which Melchior Wakenstede solves crimes in medieval Tallinn. Märten Metsaviir has portrayed Melchior in films.

The beginning of the 21st century brought many new poets such as Jürgen Rooste (1979), Ivar Sild (1977), Wimberg (pen name of Jaak Urmet, 1979), and Kristiina Ehin (1977), all of whom have distinctive voices combined with a profound knowledge of both Estonian and world literature.

Rooste is a socially-involved and "beat-like" person. Sild proclaims his gay outlook, Wimberg creates absurd landscapes through the use of childlike language and style and Ehin maintains the tradition of the "great female poet" of Estonia.

Proses also flourishes. Over recent years, the work of Rein Raud has won him both numerous awards at home and international acclaim. His most notable books include The Reconstruction, the story of a dying father trying to find out the circumstances of his daughter's suicide in a religious cult (2012, in English 2017, Dalkey Archive Press) and The Brother (2008, in English 2016, Open Letter Books), called by the author "a spaghetti Western in poetic prose". Andrus Kivirähk has skilfully combined his comic talent and ethno-fantasy in The Man Who Spoke Snakish (2007, in English 2015, Grove Press). Indrek Hargla is a prolific writer of several kinds of genre fiction including sci-fi, fantasy and crime. His reputation relies mainly on his Apothecary Melchior series, set in medieval Tallinn. Besides Kaur Kender (1971), whose finest hour was in 1998 with the debut novel Iseseisvuspäev ("Independence Day"), a younger generation is appearing. Sass Henno (1982) stays in the Chuck Palahniuk-influenced tradition of Kaur Kender. Chaneldior wrote a quintessential novel in the manner of Bret Easton Ellis called Kontrolli alt väljas ("Out of Control") in 2008 and Peeter Helme's (1978) second novel September (2009) received critical acclaim for its realistic description of life in Tallinn's office environments as existed at the dawn of this new millennium.

According to a study Estonia leads the world in book ownership, on average Estonians own 218 different books per house, and 35% own 350 books or more (as of 2018).
