= List of Estonian poets =

A list of notable Estonian poets:

== A ==
- Kai Aareleid
- Johannes Aavik
- Hendrik Adamson
- Artur Adson
- Vahur Afanasjev
- Eda Ahi
- Ave Alavainu
- Andres Allan
- August Alle
- Artur Alliksaar
- Betti Alver
- Ott Arder

== B ==
- Johannes Barbarus
- Vladimir Beekman
- Priidu Beier
- Veiko Belials
- Mihkel Bravat

== E ==
- Andres Ehin
- Kristiina Ehin
- Salme Ekbaum
- Ernst Enno

== G ==
- Villem Grünthal-Ridala

== H ==
- Paul Haavaoks
- Lehte Hainsalu
- Aime Hansen
- Viiu Härm
- Marie Heiberg
- Mehis Heinsaar
- Erni Hiir
- Indrek Hirv

== I ==
- Aapo Ilves
- Jaan Isotamm
- Ivar Ivask

== J ==
- Merle Jääger (pen name Merca)
- Carl Robert Jakobson
- Peeter Jakobson
- Jaak Jõerüüt
- Ottniell Jürissaar

== K ==
- Bernard Kangro
- Maarja Kangro
- Jaan Kaplinski
- Doris Kareva
- Jaan Kärner
- Kalev Kesküla
- Sven Kivisildnik
- Lydia Koidula
- Ilmi Kolla
- Friedrich Reinhold Kreutzwald
- Jaan Kross
- Erni Krusten
- Asko Künnap

== L ==
- Ilmar Laaban
- Uno Laht
- Leonhard Lapin
- Eha Lättemäe
- Ira Lember
- Kalju Lepik
- Juhan Liiv
- Martin Lipp
- Viivi Luik

== M ==
- Uku Masing
- Kersti Merilaas
- Arvo Mets
- Ene Mihkelson
- Mikk Murdvee
- Kalle Muuli

== N ==
- Ellen Niit
- Minni Nurme

== O ==
- Sulev Oll
- Tõnu Õnnepalu

== P ==
- Jaan Pehk
- Kristjan Jaak Peterson

== R ==
- Alexis Rannit
- Eno Raud
- Mart Raud
- Karl Ristikivi
- Jürgen Rooste
- Andrus Rõuk
- Paul-Eerik Rummo

== S ==
- August Sang
- Johannes Semper
- Karl Martin Sinijärv
- Juhan Smuul
- Lauri Sommer
- Eric Stenbock
- Gustav Suits
- Juhan Sütiste

== T ==
- Jüri Talvet
- Heiti Talvik
- Tarmo Teder
- Tiia Toomet
- Mats Traat
- Tõnu Trubetsky
- Leelo Tungal
- Ülo Tuulik

== U ==
- Kauksi Ülle
- Marie Under
- Jaak Urmet

== V ==
- Debora Vaarandi
- Kätlin Vainola
- Aidi Vallik
- Arvo Valton
- Johannes Vares
- Mihkel Veske
- Enn Vetemaa
- Elo Viiding
- Juhan Viiding
- Paul Viiding
- Heiki Vilep
- Henrik Visnapuu
- Peeter Volkonski

== W ==
- Wimberg
