= Uku Masing =

Estonian philosopher (1909–1985)

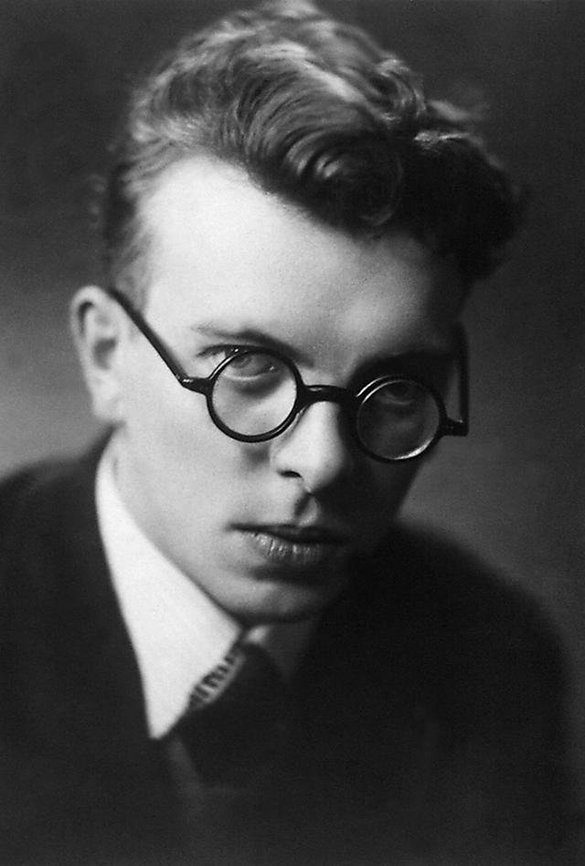
- Born: Hugo Albert Masing; 11 August 1909; Lipa, Russian Empire
- Died: 25 April 1985 (aged 75); Tartu, then part of Estonian SSR, Soviet Union
- Occupations: Philosopher, theologian, poet, writer, folklorist, linguist
- Years active: 1934–1985
- Spouse: Eha Gnadenteich (m. 1939)

Uku Masing (born Hugo Albert Masing, 11 August 1909 – 25 April 1985) was an Estonian polymath who contributed to theology, oriental studies, philosophy, poetry, folklore and to the field of ethnology. He was a significant figure in Estonian religious philosophy. Masing also wrote poetry, mostly on religious issues. Masing authored one novel, Rapanui vabastamine ehk Kajakad jumalate kalmistul (Liberation of Rapa Nui, or Seagulls at the Cemetery of Gods) in the late 1930s, which was published posthumously in 1989. As a folklorist, he was a distinguished researcher of fairy tales, contributing to the international Encyclopedia of the Folktale. He was awarded the Righteous Among The Nations by Yad Vashem and the Israeli Supreme Court for his participation during the Holocaust in helping a Jew in Estonia escape capture from 1941 until the end of the war. His actions exposed him to great danger during this period requiring him to meet with his friend as well as lying to the Gestapo.

== Early life ==
Masing was born in the village of Lipa on 11 August 1909 as Hugo Albert Masing. His parents were Ado Masing and Anna Masing. He had one sibling, a younger sister named Agnes Masing (married surname, Saag) born in 1911. A gifted polyglot, he was able to speak four languages by the end of secondary school and forty by the end of his life. He started to study theology at the University of Tartu in 1926. During his time there and after his graduation he published numerous poems, translations, and essays. His most famous work was in 1935 with the publication of Promontories into the Gulf of Rains (Estonian: Neemed vihmade lahte).

Masing was a member of the influential group of Estonian poets brought together in 1938 by literary scholar Ants Oras, who was greatly influenced by T. S. Eliot. The small circle of poets became known as Arbujad ("Soothsayers") and included Heiti Talvik, Betti Alver, Paul Viiding, Mart Raud, Bernard Kangro, August Sang and Kersti Merilaas.

At his peak Masing was able to speak around 65 languages with the ability to translate from 20 of them. He was known for his ability to translate straight from original Hebrew, occidental European and oriental languages into Estonian. Such was his prolific nature that it is estimated over 10,000 pages of his manuscripts have yet to be published. Masing was known for his anti-German sentiment, which was the core of what at times was his general dislike of the Indo-European people.

== Righteous Among the Nations award ==
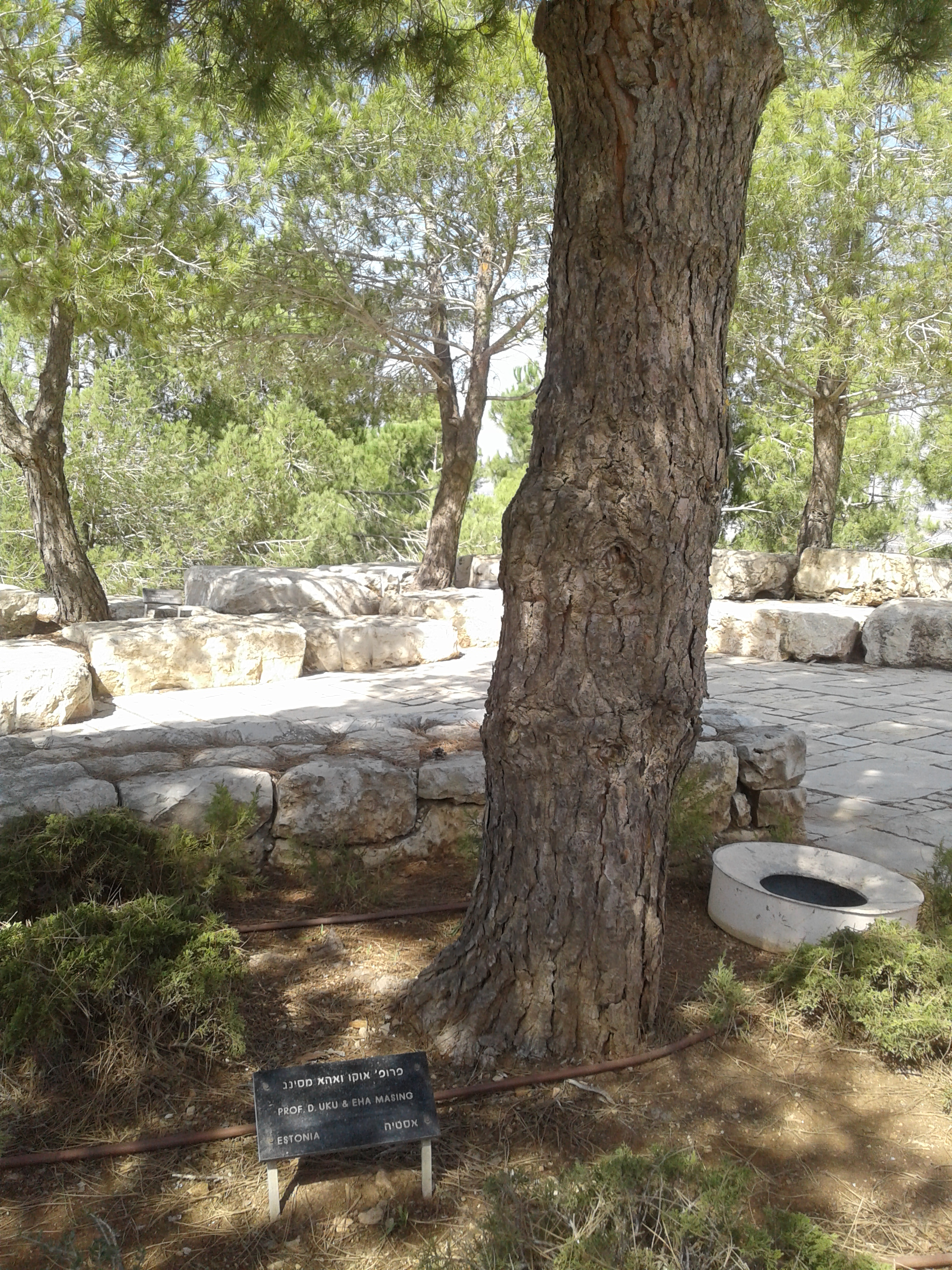
Uku and Eha Masing's tree, planted by Yad Vashem in recognition of the Masings being "Righteous Among the Nations."

Masing lectured at the University of Tartu in Estonia, where he was known as a brilliant teacher of theology and Semitic languages, if somewhat eccentric. After the German invasion of Estonia in World War II he gave up his teaching post at the university and devoted his time to protecting and salvaging Jewish cultural and religious items.

Masing knew the Jewish folklorist, narrative researcher and theologian Isidor Levin from his teaching days, and decided to hide him from the Germans who most certainly would have brought him to death. Masing and his wife Eha helped Levin evade capture by supplying him with food, shelter, clothing and even forged documents, while on occasion lying to the Gestapo about knowledge of Isidor. For these actions, Masing and his wife were honoured as Righteous Among the Nations. After the war, Masing also took part in investigating Nazi war crimes, in particular the Klooga concentration camp where many Jews had been killed.

== Selection of scientific works ==
- 1936 "The Word of Yahweh". — Acta et commentationes Universitatis Tartuensis (Dorpatensis). B, Humaniora. XXXIX, Tartu, 1936, pp. 1–60.
- 1938 "Der Prophet Obadja. Bd. I: Einleitung in das Buch des Propheten Obadja. Teil I". — Acta et commentationes Universitatis Tartuensis (Dorpatensis). B, Humaniora, XLI, Tartu, 1938, pp. 1–176.
- 1938 "Die Proklamation des Tab'alsohnes (Zu Zach. 9)". — In piam memcriam A. von Bulmerincq, Riga, 1938, pp. 117–126.
- 1944 "Die Entstehung des Märchens vom gestohlenen Donnerinstrument (Aarne-Thompson 1148B)". — Zeitschrift für deutsches Altertum und deutsche Literatur 81, 1944, pp. 23–31.
- 1960 "Das Evangelium des Alten Testaments". — Communio Viatorum 2, 1960, pp. 123–132.
- 1961 "Confessio amantis". — Communio Viatorum, 1961, pp. 139–160.
- 1963 "Panta dynata". — Communio Viatorum 4, pp. 242–262.
- 1969 "C. Scott Littleton, The New Comparative Mythology: an anthropological assessment of the theories of Georges Dumézil". — Semiotica 1, 1969, pp. 339–355.
- 1973 "De hermeneutica". — Communio Viatorum 1–2, 1973, pp. 1–29
- 1974 "Akkadisches miksu in Osteuropa". — Wirtschaft und Gesellschaft im Alten Vorderasien, J. Harmatta and G. Komoróczy (toim.); Acta Antiqua Academiae Scientarum Hungaricae 22, 1974 / 1976, pp. 521–526.
- 1976 "Some remarks on the mythology of the people of Catal Hüyük". — Acta et commentationes Universitatis Tartuensis 392: Oriental Studies 3 / Tartu Riikliku Ülikooli Toimetised 392, Töid orientalistika alalt 3, Tartu 1976, pp. 75–92.
- 1979 "Elpida echomen". — Communio Viatorum 1, 1979, pp. 1–28
- 1981 "Die "Hand" im Alten. Testament und die estnische Übersetzung". — La main et les doigts dans l´expression linguistique, Lacito-Documents Eurasie 6, Paris, SELAF, 1981, pp. 213–222.
- 1981 "Der Gegnersucher (AT 650 B). Varianten aus Kaukasien und Sibirien". — Acta et commentationes Universitatis Tartuensis 558 / Oriental Studies VI, Tartu, 1981, lk. 17–35.
- 1982 Isidor Levin, Uku Masing, Armenische Märchen. — Eugen Diedrichs Verlag, Düsseldorf, 1982, 283 pp.
- 1982 "Ocellot, Mal Ocellot". — Folklorica: Festschrift for Felix J. Oinas. Indiana University, Uralic and Altaic Series 141. Bloomington, Indiana: Research Institute for Inner Asian Studies, 1982, pp. 173–184.
- 1984 "Esten". — Enzyklopädie des Märchens. Handwörterbuch zur historischen und vergleichenden Erzählforschung 4. Berlin -New York: Walter de Gruyter, 1984, pp. 479–491.

== About Uku Masing ==
- Vincent B. Leitch, "Religious Vision in Modern Poetry: Uku Masing Compared with Hopkins and Eliot". - Journal of Baltic Studies 5, 1974, pp. 281–294.
- Ivar Ivask, "Uku Masing: A poet between east and west". - Journal of Baltic Studies 8, 1977, pp. 16–21.
- Aira Võsa, "Spiegelt Sprache die Seele? Einige Aspekte in der religiösen Identität der Estinnen und Esten in den Augen von Uku Masing". – Journal of the European Society of Women in Theological Research 14, 2006, pp. 109–120.
- Peeter Espak, "Sumerian inim, Hebrew דבר יהוה and Polynesian mana in the Early Theories of Uku Masing". - Forschungen zur Anthropologie und Religionsgeschichte 43, 2012, pp. 71–85.
- Urmas Nõmmik, "Uku Masing und das Alte Testament". - Forschungen zur Anthropologie und Religionsgeschichte 43, 2012, pp. 187–198.

== See also ==
- Buddhism in Estonia
- Linnart Mäll
