= Isotamm =

Family name

Isotamm is an Estonian language surname. Notable people with the surname include:

- Arnold Isotamm (1900–1967), military general and lecturer
- Ingrid Isotamm (born 1979), actress
- Jaan Isotamm (1939–2014), poet
