= Paul Viiding =

Estonian poet, author and literary critic (1904–1962)

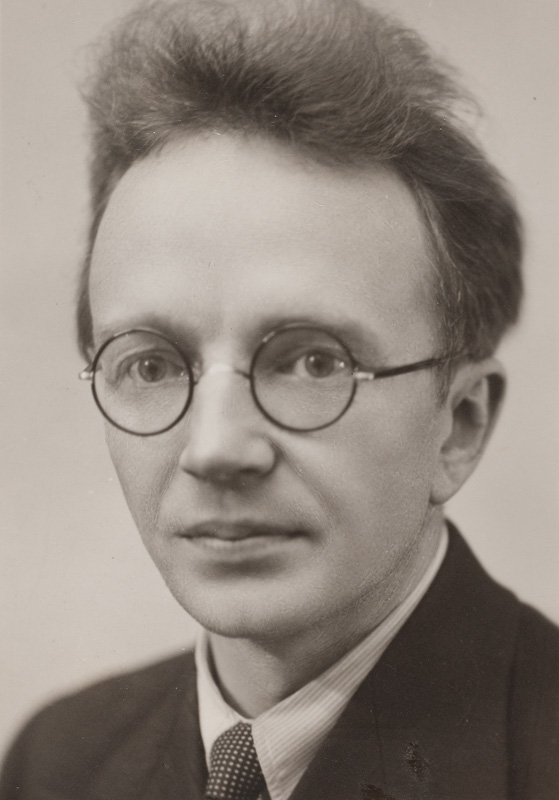
- Viiding in 1939
- Born: 22 May 1904; Valga, Governorate of Livonia, Russian Empire
- Died: 27 June 1962 (aged 58); Tallinn, then part of Estonian SSR, Soviet Union
- Occupations: Poet, writer, literary critic
- Years active: 1934–1959
- Spouse: Linda Laarmann

Paul Viiding (22 May 1904 – 27 June 1962) was an Estonian poet, author, and literary critic.

Born in Valga to Juhan and Ann Viiding (née Rose), he was the oldest of two children; his sister Linda was born in 1907. He attended the Hugo Treffner Gymnasium and graduated with a degree in mathematics from the University of Tartu in 1930, before pursuing a career as an author and poet. He was a member of the influential group of Estonian poets brought together in 1938 by the literary scholar Ants Oras, who was greatly influenced by T. S. Eliot. The small circle of six poets became known as Arbujad (Soothsayers) and included Heiti Talvik, Betti Alver, Uku Masing, Bernard Kangro, Kersti Merilaas, Mart Raud, and August Sang.

Viiding married the translator Linda Laarmann (1906–2003) and had four children: Reet, Anni, Mari Tarand, and the youngest (and only son) Juhan Viiding. His grandchildren include the historian Juhan Kreem, musician Jaagup Kreem, poet Elo Viiding, politician Indrek Tarand, and journalist Kaarel Tarand.

Viiding died in Tallinn, Estonia, in 1962.

== Sources ==
- Tarand, Mari. Katse mõista Paul Viidingu teekonda. In: Akadeemia 1997, No. 3, pp. 598–611
