= Kersti Merilaas =

Estonian poet and translator

- Born: Eugenie Moorberg; 7 December 1913; Narva, Saint Petersburg Governorate, Russian Empire
- Died: 8 March 1986 (aged 72); Tallinn, then part of Estonian SSR, Soviet Union
- Occupations: Poet, translator
- Years active: 1935–1986
- Spouse: August Sang
- Children: Liina Pihlak, Maarja Panov, Joel Sang

Kersti Merilaas (7 December [O.S. 24 November] 1913 in Narva – 8 March 1986 in Tallinn) was an Estonian poet and translator. In addition, she wrote poems and prose for children and plays.

== Early life and education ==
Kersti Merilaas was born Eugenie Moorberg to Jaan Johannes and Anna Moorberg (née Kobbin) in Narva, in the Saint Petersburg Governorate (now Estonia) shortly before the outbreak of the First World War. She spent her early childhood in St. Petersburg, Russia with her mother and younger sister Lydia. The family returned to Estonia in 1917 because of the turmoil of the Russian Revolution. From 1921 to 1927 she attended school in the village of Kiltsi, then furthered her studies in Väike-Maarja and Rakvere in Lääne-Viru County. In 1932, she completed high school in Tapa, Estonia.

== Career ==
In 1935, she made her literary debut with a collection of poems titled Loomingus.

In 1936, Merilaas married the Estonian writer and translator August Sang (1914–1969). The couple's children include artist Liina Pihlak, pediatrician and pulmonologist Maarja Panov, and poet, literary critic, linguist, translator and publicist Joel Sang.

From 1936, Merilaas lived in Tartu, where she was employed as a librarian. She was a member of the influential group of Estonian poets brought together in 1938 by literary scholar Ants Oras who was greatly influenced by T. S. Eliot. The small circle of poets became known as Arbujad ("Soothsayers") and included Heiti Talvik, Paul Viiding, Betti Alver, Uku Masing and Bernard Kangro That year, her anthology of poetry Maantee tuuled was published to much critical acclaim, particularly for its lyrical preoccupation with love and nature. Also in 1938 she joined the Estonian Writers' Union.

After the Soviet occupation and annexation of Estonia in 1944, Merilaas' work was viewed by authorities as disreputable and promoting "bourgeois nationalism". In 1950, Merilaas was forced to resign from the Soviet Writers Association of Estonia. During this time, Merilaas was allowed to continue writing children's literature. In 1960, after the relaxation of Soviet authorities, Merilaas was again permitted to write literature for adults.

Besides poetry and prose, Merilaas wrote libretti for three operas by Estonian composer Gustav Ernesaks and translated German works of Bertolt Brecht, Georg Christoph Lichtenberg and Johann Wolfgang von Goethe into the Estonian language.

Merilaas died in Tallinn, Estonia in 1986 at the age of 72.

== Selected works ==
Poetry

- Loomingus (1935)
- Maantee tuuled (1938)
- Rannapääsuke (1963)
- Kevadised koplid (1966)
- Kuukressid (1969)
- Antud ja võetud (1981)

Children's Books

- Munapühad (1940)
- Kallis kodu (collection of poems, 1944)
- Päikese paistel collection of poems (1948)
- Turvas (1950)
- Veskilaul (1959)
- Lugu mustast ja valgest (1962)
- Lumest lumeni (1982)
- Kui vanaema noor oli (poetry anthology, 1983)
- Kindakiri. – Варежки (poem in Estonian and Russian, 1986)
- Siit siiani. Piksepill (collection of poems, 1989. Posthumous)

Plays

- Kaks viimast rida (1973)
- Pilli-Tiidu (1974)

== Awards ==
In 1976, Kersti Merilaas was awarded the Friedebert Tuglas Short Story Award for her work Eilsete perest.
