= Lipa, Estonia =

Village in Estonia

Coordinates: 58°55′N 24°43′E

Lipa
- Village
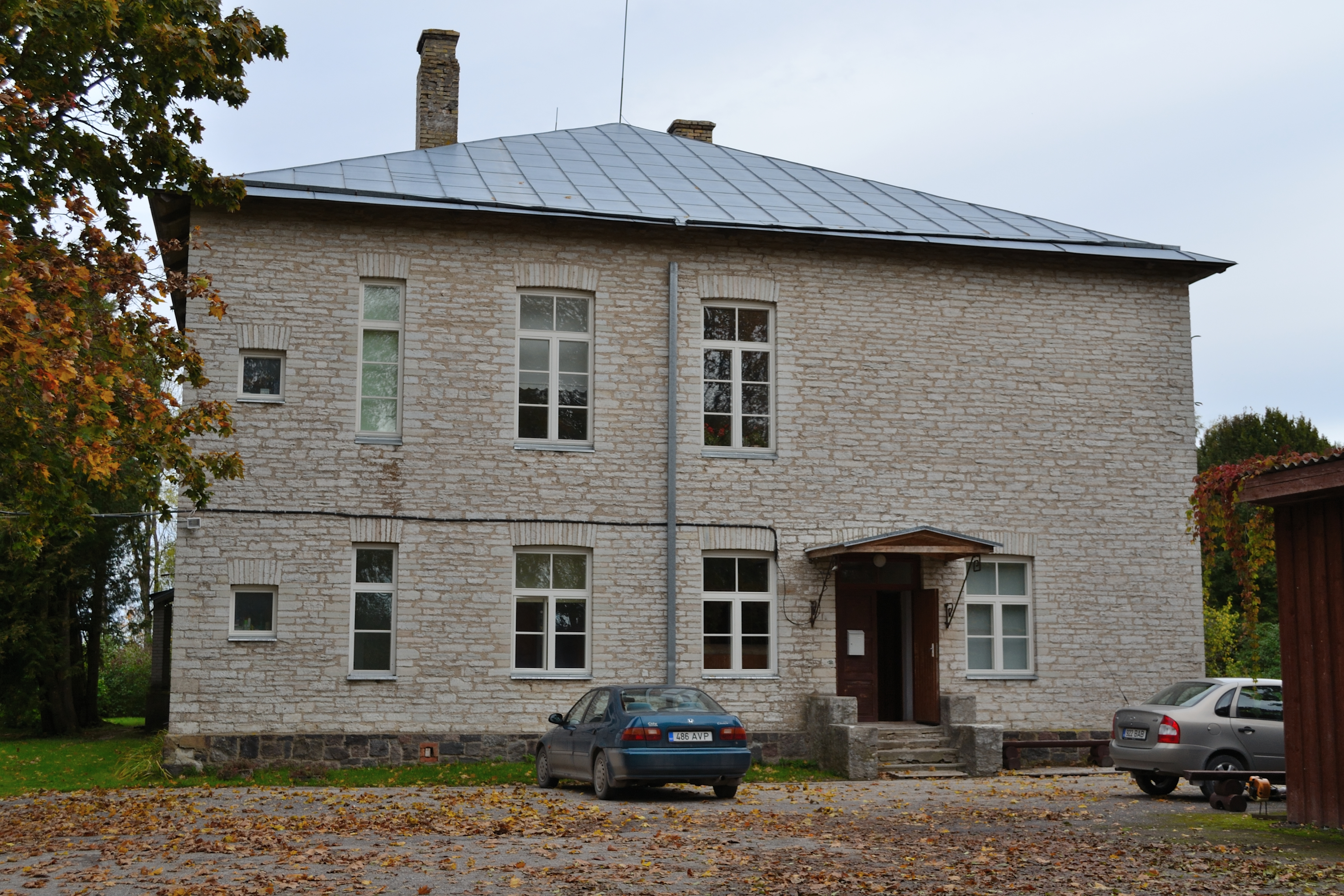
- Raikküla Ministry School building in Lipa
- Interactive map of Lipa
- Country: Estonia
- County: Rapla County
- Parish: Rapla Parish
- Time zone: UTC+2 (EET)
  - Summer (DST): UTC+3 (EEST)

Lipa is a village in Rapla Parish, Rapla County in northwestern Estonia. Between 1991 and 2017 (until the administrative reform of Estonian municipalities) the village was located in Raikküla Parish.

Philosopher, translator, theologist and folklorist Uku Masing (1909–1985) was born in Einu (Eedu) farmstead in Lipa village.

== Gallery ==
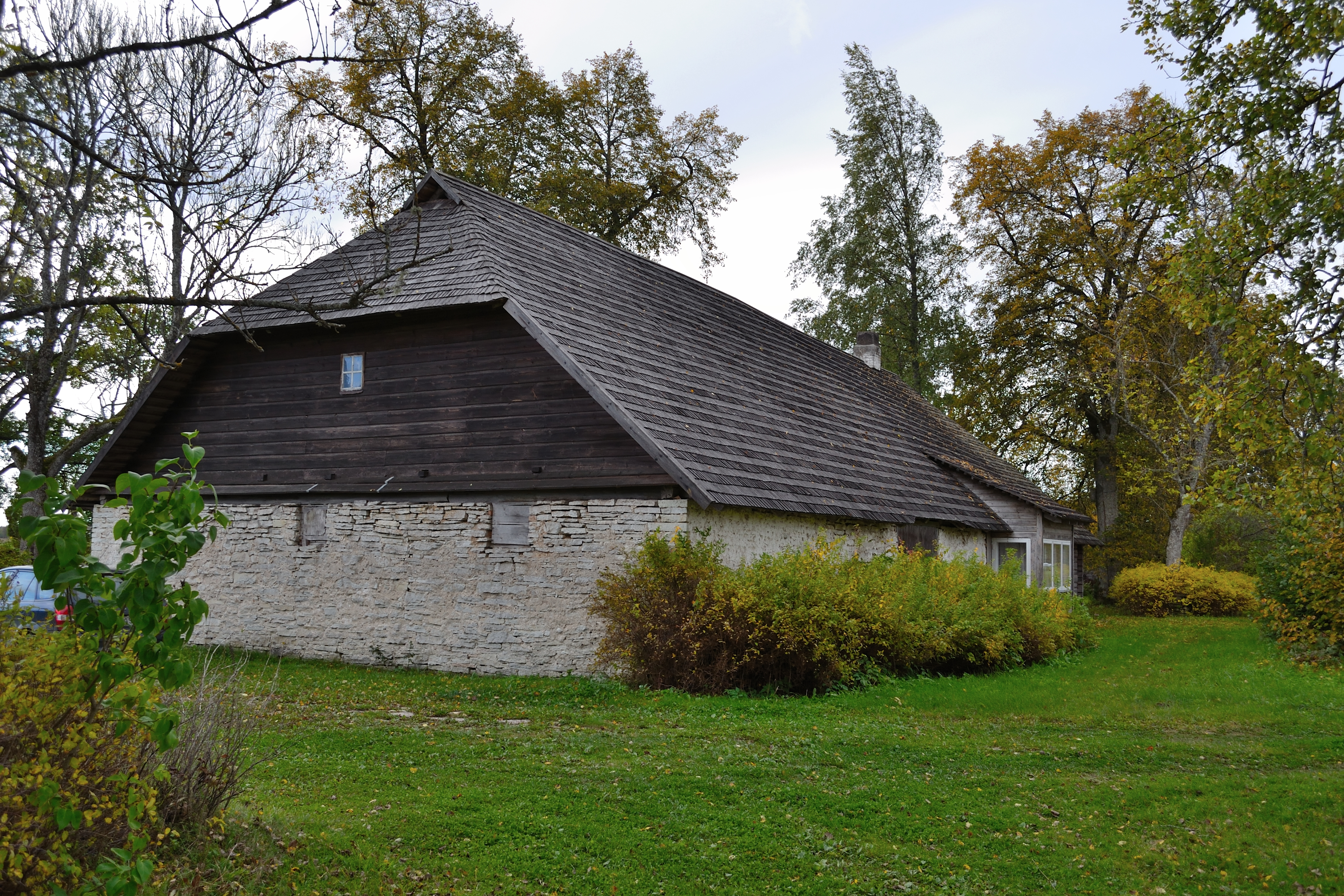
Uku Masing's birthplace
