= Jaak Urmet =

Estonian writer

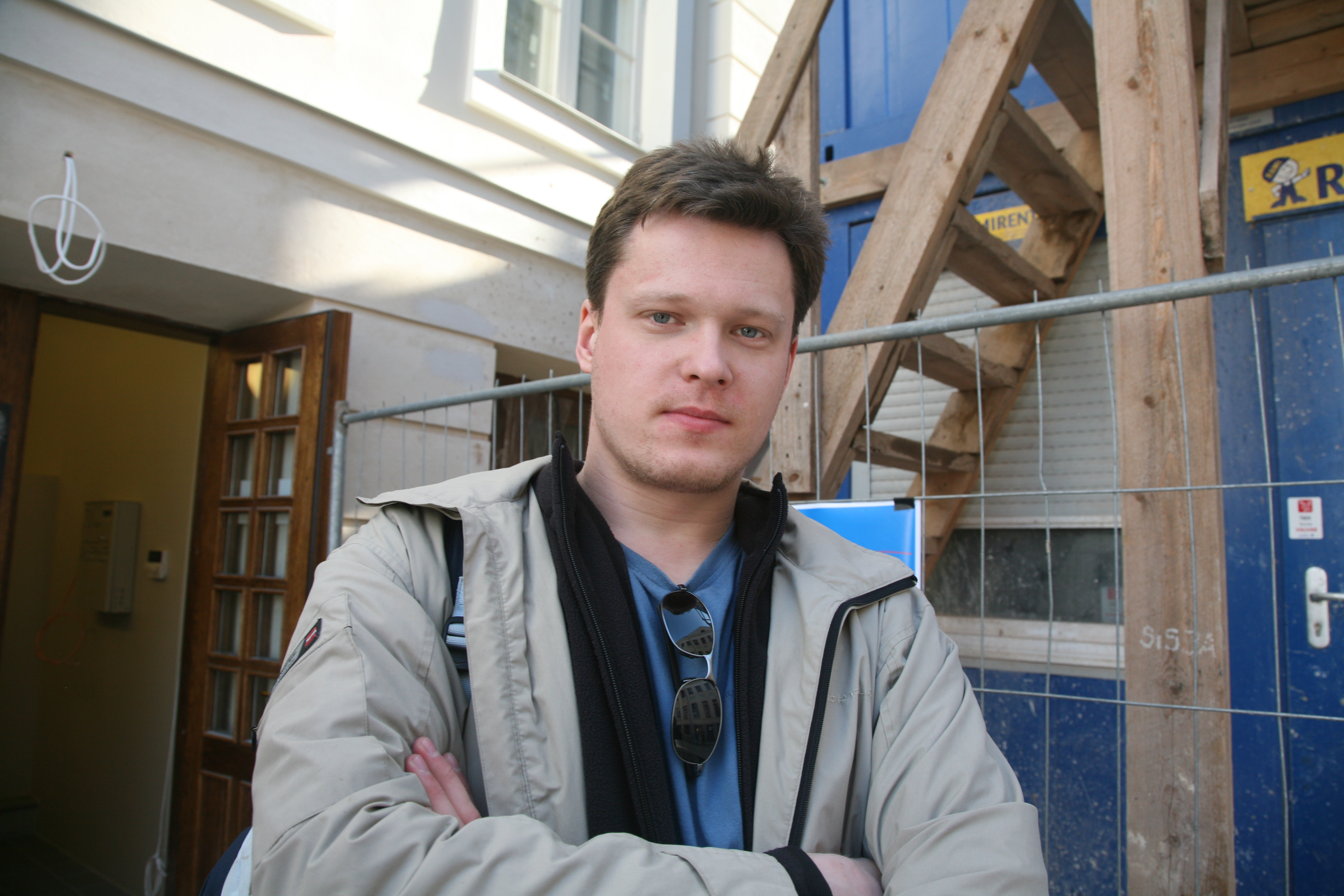
Wimberg in May 2007 in Tartu. Photo by Inno Tähismaa

Jaak Urmet (pseudonym: Wimberg; born 30 January 1979, in Saku, Soviet Union) is an Estonian writer.

Jaak Urmet studied Estonian philology and history (from 1997 to 2002) at the Tallinn Pedagogical University and from 2002 to 2004 literary theory (the same university), graduated as M.A. Urmet participated Tallinna Noored Tegijad (a fellowship of young authors in Tallinn) from 1998 to 2000 and is a member of Young Authors' Association in Tartu since 2000. From 2006 on, Urmet is a member of the Tallinn Club of Bibliophiles, from 2007 on a member of the Estonian Literary Society and the Estonian Union of Writers.

Urmet started publishing articles, reviews and essays in 1999. In 2000, he made his debut as a poet with the collection "Maaaraamat". From 2001 to 2007 he worked as the editor of Arkaadia, a cultural addendum of Eesti Päevaleht. Wimberg's (Urmet's) novel "Lipamäe" (which was noted on 2002 Estonian novel contest and awarded Virumaa prize of literature in 2002) is a postmodernist story of a young man who moves from urban area to countryside after the death of his grandfather. The novel shows a blend of realism and phantasy: autobiographic reflections on the last decade of the Soviet era in countryside alternate with magic present (e.g. one of the characters is the devil). The events take place in a real location – the village of Kaaruka in Järvamaa.

Wimberg's collections of poetry ("Maaaraamat" and "Kärppsed") depict autobiographic thoughts. In his works, Wimberg uses (his own) innovative orthography of Estonian language.

== Bibliography ==
- Maaaraamat (Huma 2000)
- Lipamäe (Varrak 2002)
- Kolme päkapiku jõulud (co-authors Jürgen Rooste and Karl Martin Sinijärv) (Huma 2002, children poetry)
- Buratino laulud (Varrak 2005, children poetry)
- Bootleg (2006) – a collection of 'Web poetry'. See: https://web.archive.org/web/20120212194056/http://www.hot.ee/irboska/Wimberg_-_Bootleg_(2006).pdf
- Põngerjate laulud (Varrak 2006, children poetry)
- Kärppsed (Jutulind 2006)
- Härra Padakonn (Varrak 2008, children poetry)

== Published in English ==
- Excerpt from the novel "Lipamäe" (translated in English by Ulvi Haagensen, Estonian Literary Magazine no. 17, Autumn 2003)
- Interview by Sven Vabar (Estonian Literary Magazine no. 17, Autumn 2003)
- Selected poems in "Viie tunni tee. Five Hours Away", Nordic Poetry Festival 2001 booklet (translated in English by Kalju Kruusa, Põhjamaade Ministrite Nõukogu Tallinna Infobüroo, Tallinn 2001)
- Review of novel "Pille-Riin" by Jürgen Rooste (Estonian Literary Magazine no. 30, Spring 2010)
