= Ajaloo ilu =

1991 novel by Viivi Luik

Ajaloo ilu (The Beauty of History) is a 1991 novel by Estonian author Viivi Luik, re-issued in 2002 and revised in 2011. It has been translated into Finnish, Danish, Dutch, Russian, Swedish, Norwegian, German, Latvian, Icelandic, Hungarian, French, Catalan, English, Greek, and Albanian.

The plot unfolds in Latvia and Estonia in August 1968, when Soviet troops occupied Czechoslovakia during the Prague Spring. The leading character is a 21-year-old woman who falls in love with a sculptor.

== Summary ==
The events of the novel branch out in Latvia and Estonia in August 1968, when Soviet troops occupied Czechoslovakia (the time of the so-called Prague Spring has just passed). The main character is a 21-year-old woman who meets and falls in love with a young Jewish-Russian-Latvian blood sculptor Levi / Lion in Tallinn. He waits in Riga for the young man's residence to return from Moscow, where he is running out of military service. During this time, he is not allowed to open the door, receive the phone or look out the window, as he must give the impression that the apartment is empty - time requires it. He is visited by Levi's father and father's sister Olga, who lives abroad.
