= Valguta =

Village in Estonia

- Village
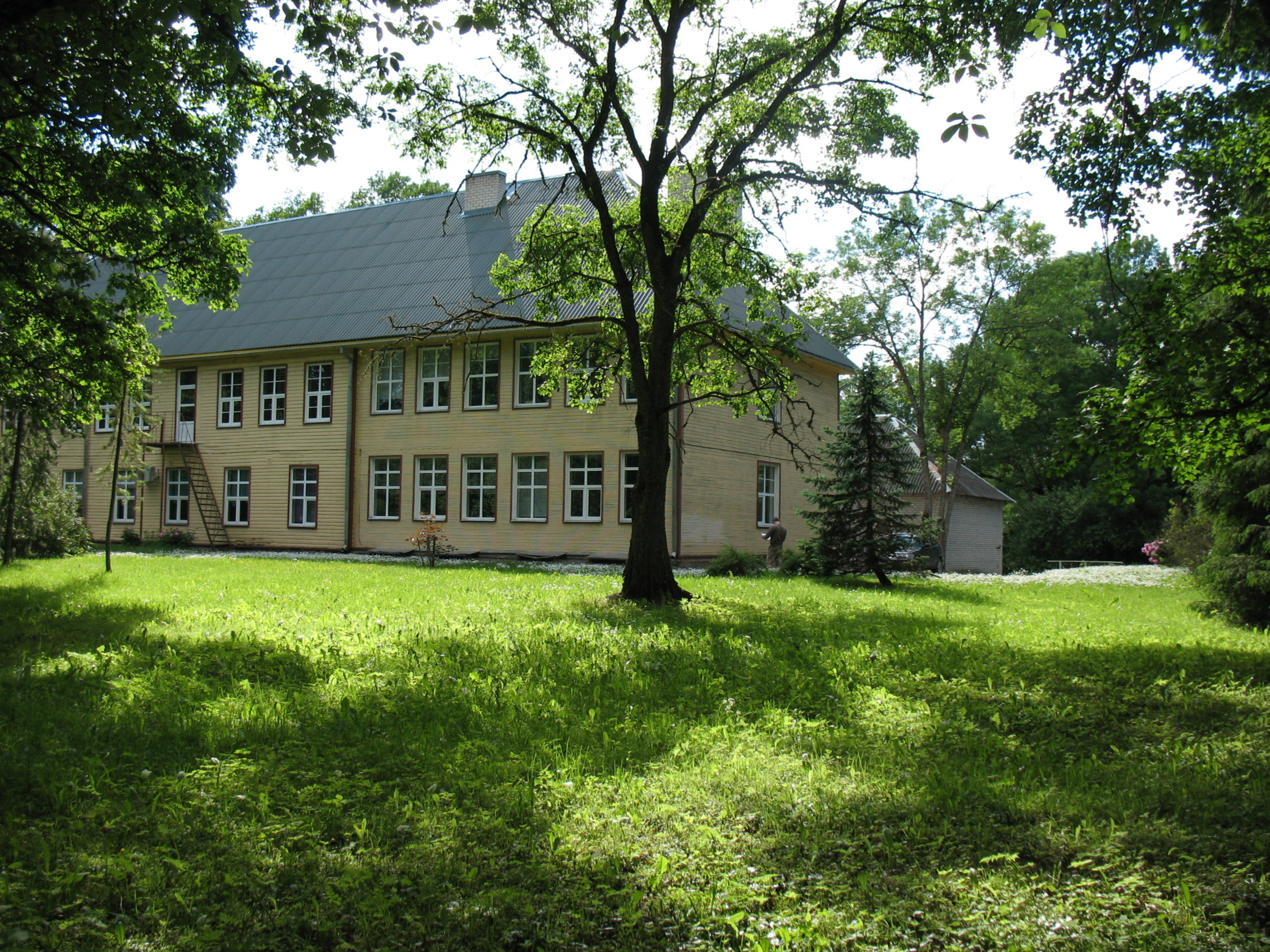
- Valguta elementary school

- Location in Estonia
- Coordinates: 58°11′25″N 26°12′27″E
- Country: Estonia
- County: Tartu County
- Municipality: Elva Parish

Population (2006)
  - Total: 170

Valguta is a village in Elva Parish, Tartu County in southern Estonia. It has a population of 170 (as of 2006).

Poet and writer Ernst Enno (1875–1934) was born in Valguta.
