= Arbujad =

1930s literary movement in Estonia

Arbujad (lit. 'sorcerers' or 'soothsayers') was the collective name for a loose group of eight Estonian poets, which represented a new direction in Estonian poetry before the outbreak of World War II.

== Members ==
The literary group included the young Estonian poets Betti Alver, Bernard Kangro, Uku Masing, Kersti Merilaas, Mart Raud, August Sang, Heiti Talvik and Paul Viiding, all born between 1904 and 1914. Most of them came from the student association Veljesto, which was active at the University of Tartu.

== Program ==
The name Arbujad comes from the title of an anthology of poems published by Ants Oras in 1938 titled Arbujad. Valimik uusimat eesti lüürikat (Shamans. A Selection of the Latest Estonian Poetry). While group's poetic works tended to be eclectic, there was a common desire among members to reach a deeper intellectual and emotional plane. The poets were for the freedom and independence of the people while being against ideological coercion and totalitarian concepts.

== Significance ==
The Soviet occupation of Estonia two years after the publication of Oras' anthology abruptly ended this period of Estonian poetry. However, Arbujad had a great influence on a new generation of Estonian poets.
