= August Sang =

Estonian poet

- Born: 27 July 1914; Pernau, Governorate of Livonia, Russian Empire (now Pärnu, Estonia)
- Died: 14 October 1969 (aged 55); Tallinn, then part of Estonian SSR, Soviet Union
- Occupations: Poet, literary translator
- Years active: 1934–1959
- Spouse: Kersti Merilaas

August Sang (27 July 1914 – 14 October 1969) was an Estonian poet and literary translator. Sang was a member of the Arbujad literary group, which represented a new direction in Estonian poetry before the outbreak of World War II. He was known as a translator of poetry from German, Russian, French and Czech languages.

== Life and work ==
August Sang was born in Pärnu, where he graduated from high school in 1932. His parents were Jakob and Akelina Sang (née Mellikov). He was the eldest of three brothers: Ilmar Sang (1916–1995) and Endel Sang (1921–2007). After his military service he studied from 1934 to 1942 at the Philosophical Faculty of the University of Tartu. Several times he had to interrupt his studies to earn money.

As early as eight years old August Sang wrote his own poetry. Under the pseudonym Injo, he successfully participated in a literary competition run by the youth magazine Kevad in 1934 with his quick tempoed poem Improvisatsioon. In 1934 he made his debut in the literary arts magazine Looming. His collection of poems Üks noormees otsib õnne was published in 1936, with which he scored his breakthrough. Since that time he also wrote numerous reviews and essays on literature. In the late 1930s, he joined in the literary circle Arbujad which included such prominent early poets and authors as Bernard Kangro, Uku Masing, Kersti Merilaas, Betti Alver, Mart Raud, Heiti Talvik and Paul Viiding. Sang's second collection of poems Müürid, was published in 1939.

In 1936 Sang married the Estonian poet and translator Kersti Merilaas and the couple had a son named Joel Sang in 1950. Sang and Merilaas had both been pivotal members of the Arbujad circle of writers.

After the Soviet annexation of Estonia, Sang joined the Soviet Estonia Writers Union in 1945, but he was expelled in 1950. Only in 1955 was Sang permitted by the Soviet authorities to work as a writer again. A year later he re-joined the Writers' Union. He died, aged 55, in Tallinn.

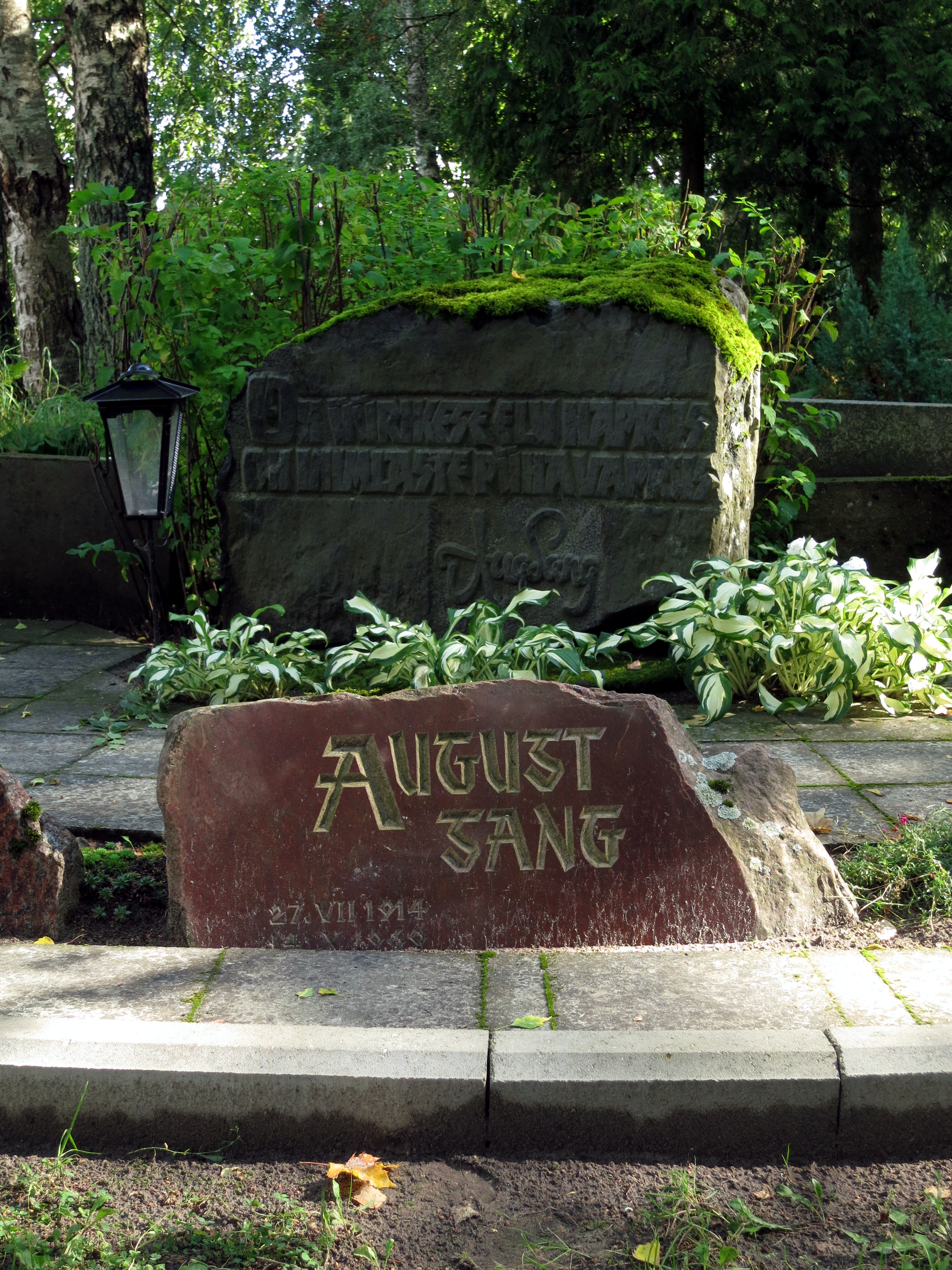
Grave of August Sang at Vana-Pärnu Cemetery.

Alongside his literary activities August Sang translated poetry and prose from the German, Russian, French and Czech into Estonian, by authors such as Goethe, Peter Weiss, Maxim Gorky, Vladimir Mayakovsky, Franz Kafka, Gottfried Keller, Molière, Egon Erwin Kisch, and Lion Feuchtwanger. Sang was especially fond of the works of Vítězslav Nezval, who Ain Kaalep has named as the reason Sang learned the Czech language.

== Legacy ==
In 2018, the Kultuuurileht Literary Publications Foundation established the August Sang poetry translation award, awarded each August for the best poetry translation published from the August of the previous year until the August of the current year.

== Works ==
- Üks noormees otsib õnne (1936)
- Arbujad: valimik uusimat eesti lüürikat (compilation 1938)
- Heinrich Heine (biography, 1938)
- Müürid (1939)
- Võileib suudlusega (1963)
- Sada laulu (selected collection, 1965)
- Luuletused (selected collection, 1970)
- Väike luuleraamat (selected collection, 1971)
- Laenatud laulud (anthology of translations in two volumes, 1973–74)
- Laulud (selected collection, 1977)
- Emajõe unisel veerel (posthumous anthology, 2003)
