= Marta Sillaots =

Estonian author, translator and writer (1887–1969)

Marta Sillaots, born Marta Reichenbach (12 May 1887 – 15 July 1969) was an Estonian writer, translator, and literary critic.

== Early life and education ==
Marta Adolfine Reichenbach was born in Rakke into a family of eleven, the daughter of postal clerk Hindrik Reichenbach. After a short time in primary school, which was interrupted due to illness, Marta Reichenbach was enrolled in the Tallinn High School for Girls, where she studied from 1895 to 1904. In 1905, Sillaots passed the exams at the Tallinn Nikolai Gymnasium and received an invitation to be a home teacher.

== Career ==
From 1907 to 1912, Reichenbach worked as a teacher in several primary schools in Tallinn. She was a keen Esperantist. In 1907, Reichenbach founded the first Estonian Esperanto society with the young journalist Johannes Adolf Rahamägi. The first printed article of Reichenbach was in Esperanto. It appeared in 1908 in the magazine Estlanda Esperantisto. Reichenbach wrote under the pen name Marta Sillaots.

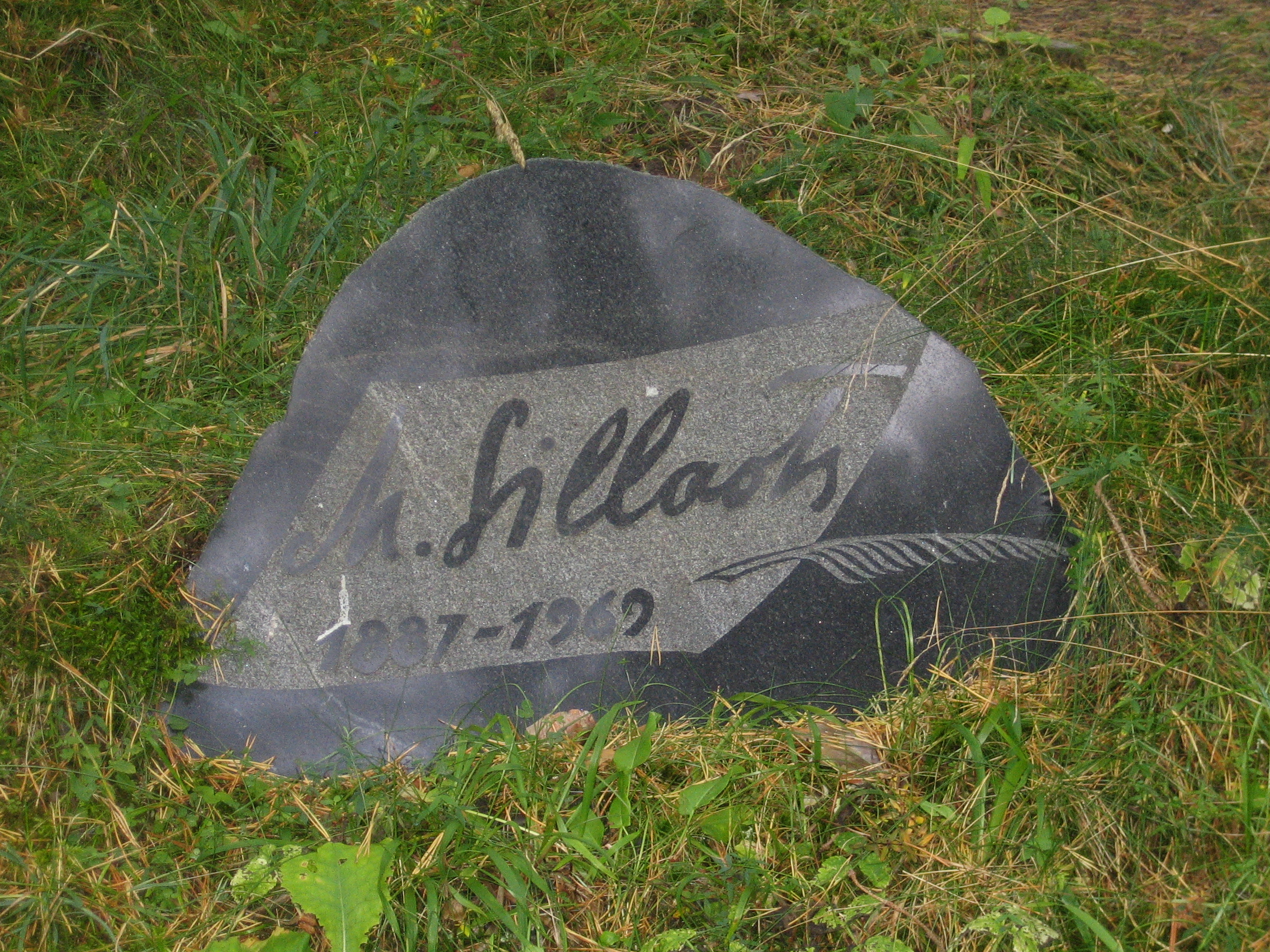
Marta Sillaots gravestone

From 1909 Sillaots wrote newspaper articles. She emerged in 1912 as a literary critic in the magazines Eesti Kirjandus and Looming and wrote novels and children's books. Recurring themes in her prose are marriage, women's emancipation, and love.

In 1916, Sillaots chose the profession of a postal clerk and worked at the Tallinn post office until 1919. From 1920 to 1922, she was the foreign news editor at Tallinna Teataja. From 1922 Sillaots lived in Tallinn as a freelance writer and translator.

From 1923 to 1936, she changed her name to Marta Gerland. In 1936, her surname was estonianized as Rannat.

In 1938, Sillaots was admitted to the Union of Estonian Writers.

After the Soviet occupation of Estonia, Sillaots was arrested in 1950. From 1952 to 1955, she lived in exile in the Sverdlovsk Oblast in the Urals. Only in 1955, Sillaots was allowed to return to Tallinn.

Sillaots translated the works from over 60 great writers from their native language; German (Thomas Mann's Der Zauberberg), French (Henri Barbusse, Gustave Flaubert, Anatole France, Roger Martin du Gard, Guy de Maupassant, Romain Rolland), English (Charles Dickens, Mark Twain, John Galsworthy) and Russian (Fyodor Dostoyevsky, Maxim Gorky, Lev Tolstoy, Ivan Turgenev).

Marta Sillaots died on 15 July 1969 in Tallinn and was buried in the Tallinn Forest Cemetery.

== Works ==
Marta Sillaots started to publish her writings about educational issues and short stories about children in Postimees in 1910. In 1912, she published the first known literary critical work, which was a review of L. Onerva's collection of short stories Murdjooned. Marta Sillaotsa's first work of fiction was Algajad (1912). Marta Sillaots has written stories and novels about the woman: Anna Holm (1913), Fifty (1937), and The Four Fates (1938). The children's book Trips, Traps and Trull (1935) gained popularity, which is an instructive story about three brothers who are constantly on adventures.

Marta Sillaots wrote important literary critical essays, such as Eduard Vilde naistüübid (1925), A. Kitzbergi tuodang (1925), AH Tammsaare looming (1927), as well as essay books Eduard Vilde (1922), August Kitzbergi (1925) and Anton Hansen about A. H. Tammsaare (1927).

Sillaots started translating in 1909. In 1914 Sillaots published his first translated work, The Court of Four by Edgar Wallace. She has translated more than 60 valuable works from French, English, Russian and German literature.

Marta Sillaots and Evald Paikre's joint pseudonym was Tuulenõe. Sillaots was connected with Evald Paikre by a long creative friendship and deep mutual respect. Marta Sillaots used different pseudonyms. Each alias had its own sectoral and stylistic use. For example, when dealing with French culture, Marta Sillaots was Caran d'Ach according to a French cartoonist, and Miss Cherry, when dealing with English literature. In Estonia she was Molli Pill, and when discussing politics, she was Longue-vue and Demokraat.

== Personal life ==
Sillaots' brothers were zoologist and hydrobiologist Heinrich Riikoja and engineer Helmut Riikoja.

In 1923, Sillaots married Julius Woldemar Gerland, who brought daughters Elisabeth and Vilhelmine to the marriage. In 1936, Sillaots name was estonianized to Gerland Rannat.
