= Tanel Rander =

Estonian artist, curator and writer (born 1980)

Tanel Rander (born 1 December 1980) is an Estonian artist, curator and writer. He has used several pseudonyms: chaneldior, chaneld:or, c:, Chanel Rantie.

In 2005, he graduated from the University of Tartu, studying law. In 2010, he graduated from the Estonian Academy of Arts, studying interdisciplinary art.

== Works ==
- 2008: novel Kontrolli alt väljas ("Out of Control")
- 2012: Tammeöö

== Exhibitions ==
- 2010: Kesktalvine hnott (Tallinn City Gallery)
- 2010: Uridaadi lõpp (Y-Gallery, Tartu)
