= Ernst Enno =

Estonian poet and writer

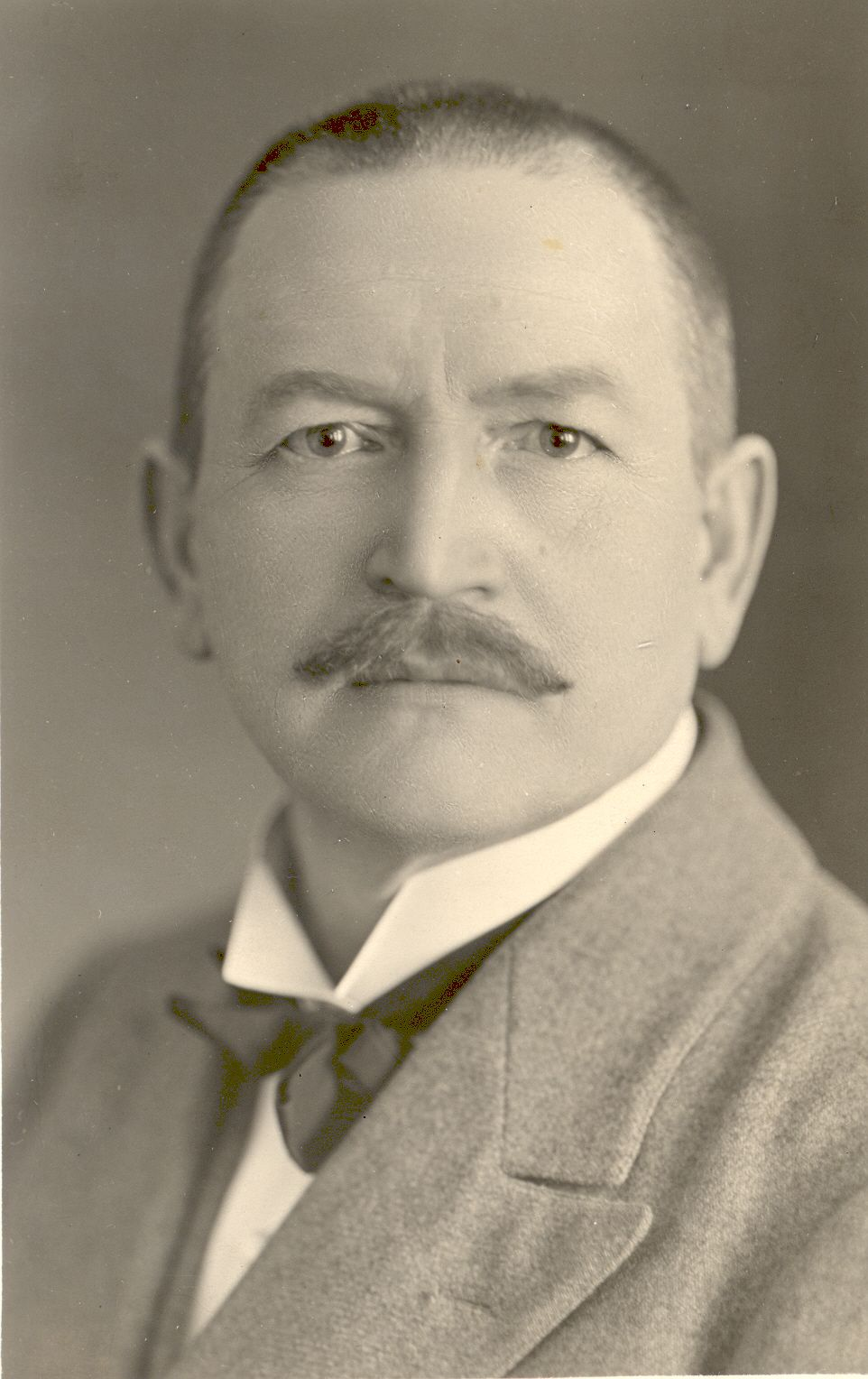
Ernst Enno

Ernst Enno (8 June [O.S. 27 May] 1875 – 7 March 1934) was an Estonian poet and writer.

== Life ==
Ernst Enno was born in Valguta, the son of the local Manor's coachman, Prits Enno. He spent his childhood on Soosaar farm in Valguta near Rõngu. At the age of eight, he attended the parish school of Lapetukme and then the prestigious Hugo Treffner Gymnasium and at the secondary school (Reaalkool) in Tartu. Enno studied business administration from 1896 to 1904 at the Riga Polytechnic Institute. During his Riga period he worked as a journalist. After studying Enno was briefly a general counsel at the credit union in Valga and in a trading company in Pärnu. 1902 to 1904 he was editor of the newspaper Postimees in Tartu and from 1923 to 1925 editor of the Estonian children's magazine Laste Rõõm, and on other magazines. In addition, he was employed from 1920 to 1934 as a training officer in Lääne County. In 1909, Enno married the artist Elfriede Olga Saul (died 1974 in exile in the UK). He died in Haapsalu.

== Work ==
The work of Ernst Enno is influenced by Buddhism and Western mysticism. Enno was in addition strongly bound to symbolism. The childhood spent in the countryside, the stories of his devout mother Ann Enno and his blind grandmother had a formative influence on his literary work. The home, the road and longing are recurring elements in his poetry.

== Published works ==
- Uued luuletused (collection of poems, 1909)
- Hallid laulud (collection of poems, 1910)
- Minu sõbrad (1910)
- Kadunud kodu (1920)
- Valge öö (collection of poems, 1920)
- Valitud värsid (anthology, 1937)
- Üks rohutirts läks kõndima (Children's book, 1957), compiled by Ellen Niit
- Väike luuleraamat (poetry, 1964)
- Rändaja õhtulaul (1998), compiled by Urmas Tõnisson
- Laps ja tuul (2000)
