= Viivi Luik =

Estonian poet and prosaist

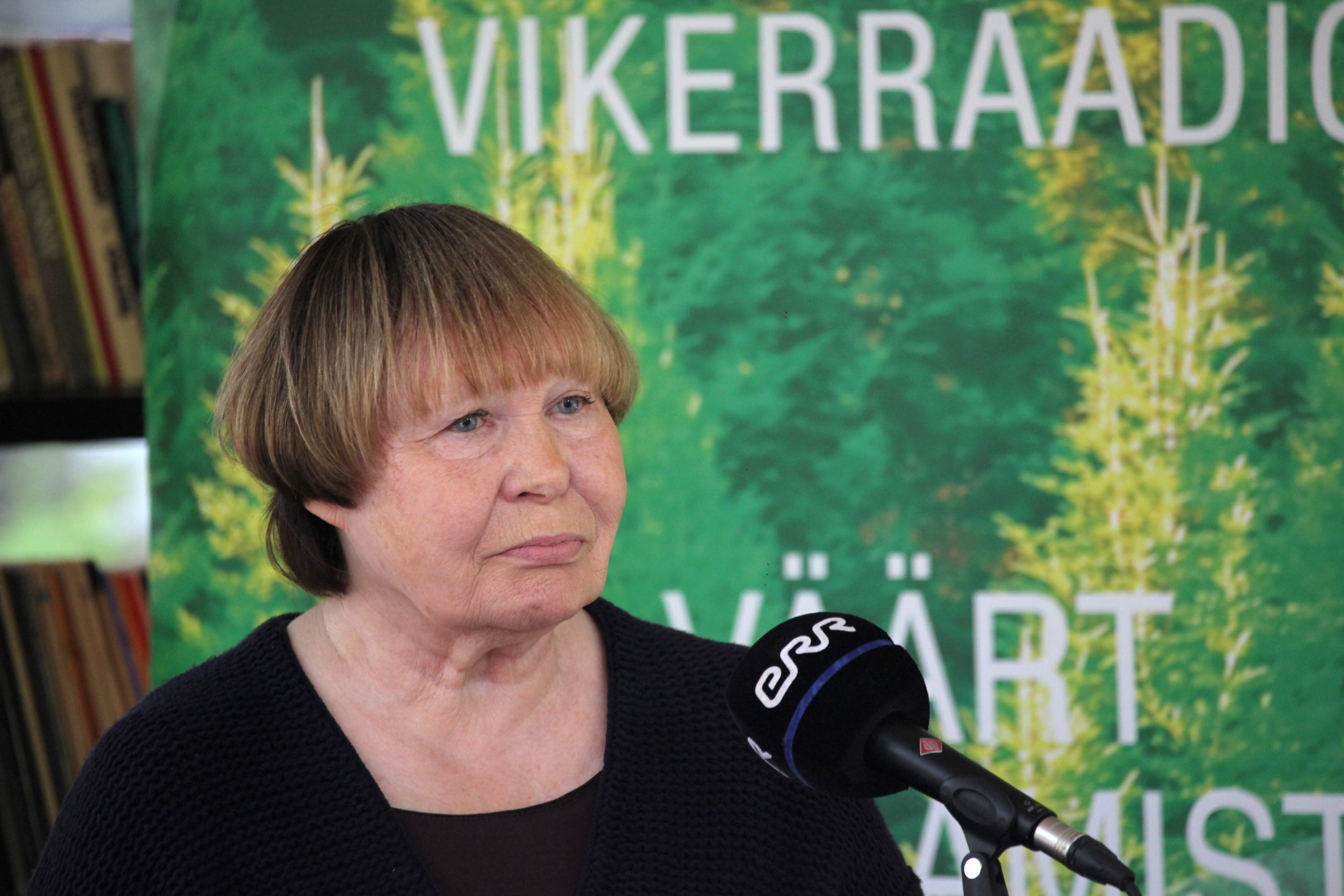
Viivi Luik at the annual Literary Street festival 2021 in Tallinn, Estonia

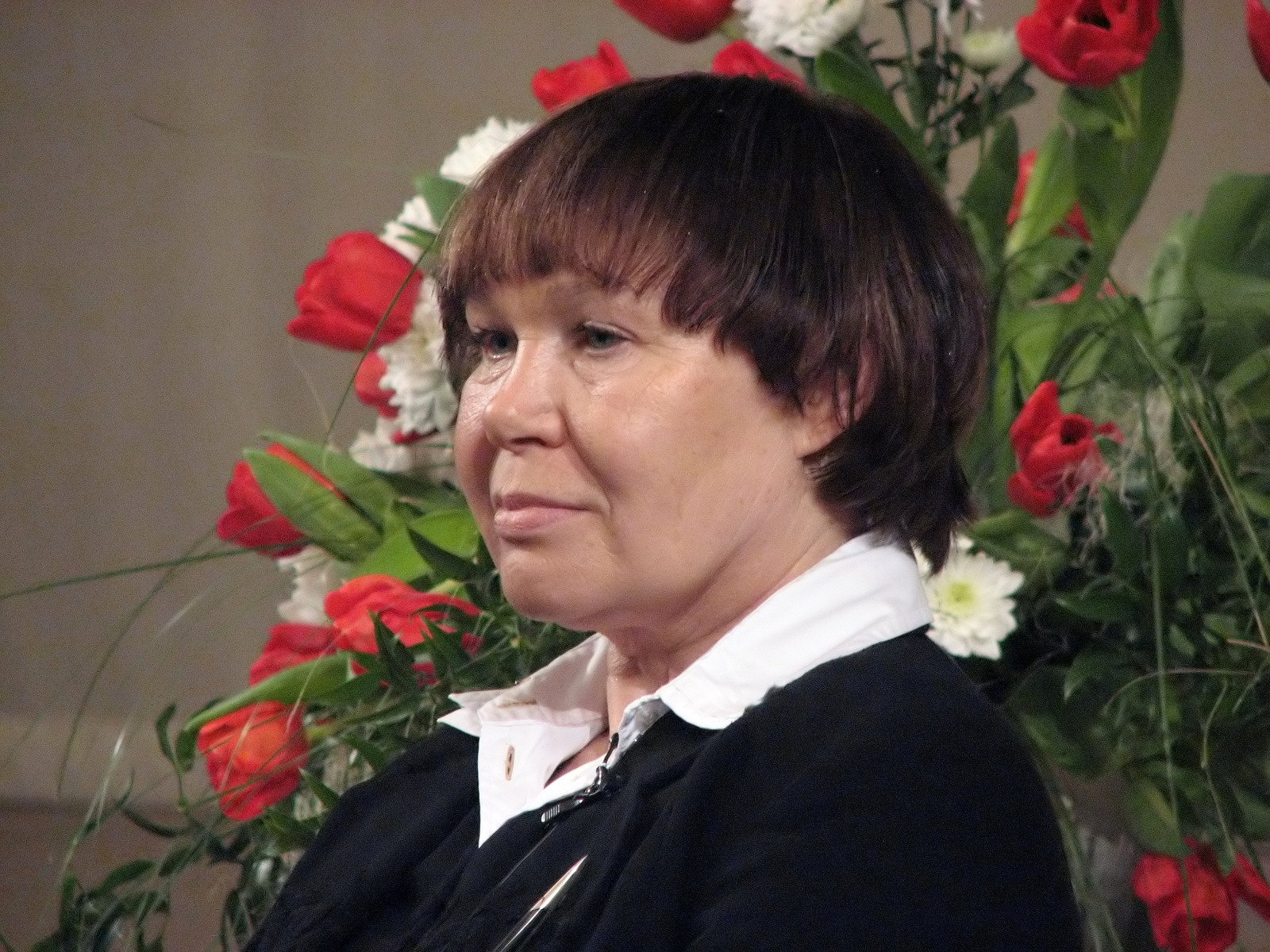
Viivi Luik in 2011 Photo: Ave Maria Mõistlik

Viivi Luik (born 6 November 1946) is an Estonian writer and poet.

== Life ==
Luik was born in Tänassilma, Viljandi County. From 1965 to 1967, she studied at the Tallinn extramural secondary school, working at the same time as a librarian. In 1970, Luik joined the Estonian Writers' Union. In 1974, Luik married Jaak Jõerüüt, another Estonian writer and later diplomat. As the wife of a diplomat, she has spent several years abroad: in Helsinki (1993–1997), Berlin (1996) and Rome (1998–2003).

== Works ==
Luik's first poem appeared in the local daily in 1962, and in 1964 she debuted in the prominent literary magazine Looming. Her first collection of poetry, Pilvede püha (Holiday of Clouds), was published in 1965.

- 1965 Pilvede püha (poetry)
- 1966 Taevaste tuul (poetry)
- 1968 Hääl (poetry)
- 1968 Lauludemüüja (poetry)
- 1971 Ole kus oled (poetry)
- 1973 Pildi sisse minek (poetry)
- 1974 Leopold (children's book)
  - 1978 Russian translation, Леопольд, Tallinn
- 1974 Salamaja piir (short story)
- 1974 Vaatame, mis Leopold veel räägib (children's book)
- 1975 Põliskevad (poetry)
- 1976 Leopold aitab linnameest (children's book)
- 1977 Luulet 1962–1974 (selected poetry)
- 1978 Maapäälsed asjad (poetry)
- 1979 Tubased lapsed (children's book)
  - 1985 Russian translation, Домашние дети, Tallinn
- 1982 Rängast rõõmust (poetry)
- 1984 Kõik lood Leopoldist (children's book)
  - 1984 Russian translation, Все рассказы о Леопольде, Tallinn
- 1985 Seitsmes rahukevad (novel)
  - 1985 Russian translation, Седьмая мирная весна, Tallinn
  - 1986 Finnish translation, Seitsemäs rauhan kevät, Helsinki (2nd edition 1987)
  - 1988 Swedish translation, Den sjunde fredsvaren, Bromma
  - 1988 Norwegian translation, Den sjuande fredsvåren, Oslo
  - 1989 Ukrainian translation, Сьома весна без війни, Kiev
  - 1991 German translation, Der siebte Friedensfrühling, Reinbek bei Hamburg
  - 1992 French translation, Le septième printemps de la paix
  - 1993 Spanish translation, La séptima primavera de la paz, Barcelona
  - 1995 Latvian translation, Septītais miera pavasaris, Riga
  - 2008 Hill Mari translation, Шӹмшӹ тыр шошым, Цикмä
  - 2018 Hungarian translation, A béke hetedik tavasza, Budapest
- 1987 Kolmed tähed (children's book)
- 1991 Ajaloo ilu (novel)
  - 1991 Finnish translation, Historian kauneus, Helsinki
  - 1991 Danish translation, Historiens skønhed, København
  - 1992 Dutch translation, De schoonheid der geschiedenis, Breda
  - 1992 Russian translation, Красота истории
  - 1993 Swedish translation, Historiens förfärande skönhet, Stockholm
  - 1994 Norwegian translation, Skremmande vakkert, Oslo
  - 1995 German translation, Die Schönheit der Geschichte, Reinbek bei Hamburg
  - 1995 Latvian translation, Vēstures skaistums, Riga
  - 1998 Icelandic translation, Tælandi fegurd sögunnar, Reykjavik
  - 1998 Hungarian translation, A történelem szépsége, Budapest
  - 2001 French translation, La beauté de l'histoire, Paris
  - 2005 Catalan translation, La bellesa de la Història, Barcelona
  - 2007 English translation, The beauty of history, Norwich
  - 2010 Albanian translation, E bukura e historisë, Shkup
- 1998 Inimese kapike (essays)
  - 2012 French translation, Le petit placard de l'homme, Paris
- 1998 Maa taevas, luulet 1962–1990 (selected poetry)
- 2005 Elujoon: valitud luuletused 1962–1997 (selected poetry)
- 2006 Aabitsajutud (children's book)
- 2006 Tubased lapsed (poetry)
- 2006 Kõne koolimaja haual: artiklid ja esseed 1998–2006 (collected articles and essays)
- 2006 Kogutud luuletused 1962–1997 (collected poetry; 2nd edition 2011)
- 2010 Varjuteater (novel)
  - 2011 Finnish translation, Varjoteatteri, Helsinki
  - 2017 Hungarian translation, Árnyékszínház, Budapest
  - 2017 Latvian translation, Ēnu teātris, Riga
  - 2018 German translation, Schattenspiel, Göttingen
- 2010 Ma olen raamat (with Hedi Rosma)
  - 2013 Latvian translation, Es esmu grāmata, Riga
- 2014 Aastasaja lõpp on aastasaja algus (poetry)
- 2017 Pildi ilu rikkumise paratamatus (essays and articles)

== Awards ==
- 1986 A. H. Tammsaare Literary Prize (for the novel Seitsmes rahukevad)
- 1988 Juhan Liiv Poetry Award
- 1992 Cultural Award of the Republic of Estonia
- 2000 Order of the White Star, 3rd Class
- 2019 Estonian National Lifetime Achievement Award for Culture
- 2020 Jaan Kross Literary Award (for the essay and article collection Pildi ilu rikkumise paratamatus)
