= Betti Alver =

Estonian novelist and poet

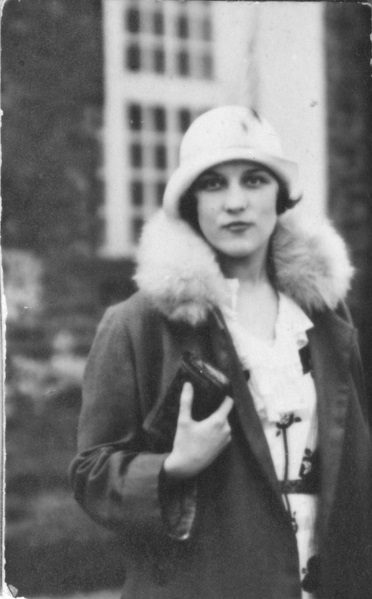
- Born: Elisabet Alver; 23 November 1906; Jõgeva, Kreis Dorpat, Governorate of Livonia, Russian Empire
- Died: 19 June 1989 (aged 82); Tartu, then part of Estonian SSR, Soviet Union
- Other names: Elisabet Talvik; Elisabet Lepik
- Occupation: Poet
- Years active: 1922–1989
- Spouses: Heiti Talvik, Mart Lepik

Elisabet "Betti" Alver (23 November [O.S. 10 November] 1906 – 19 June 1989), was one of Estonia's most notable poets. She was among the first generation to be educated in schools of an independent Estonia. She went to grammar school in Tartu.

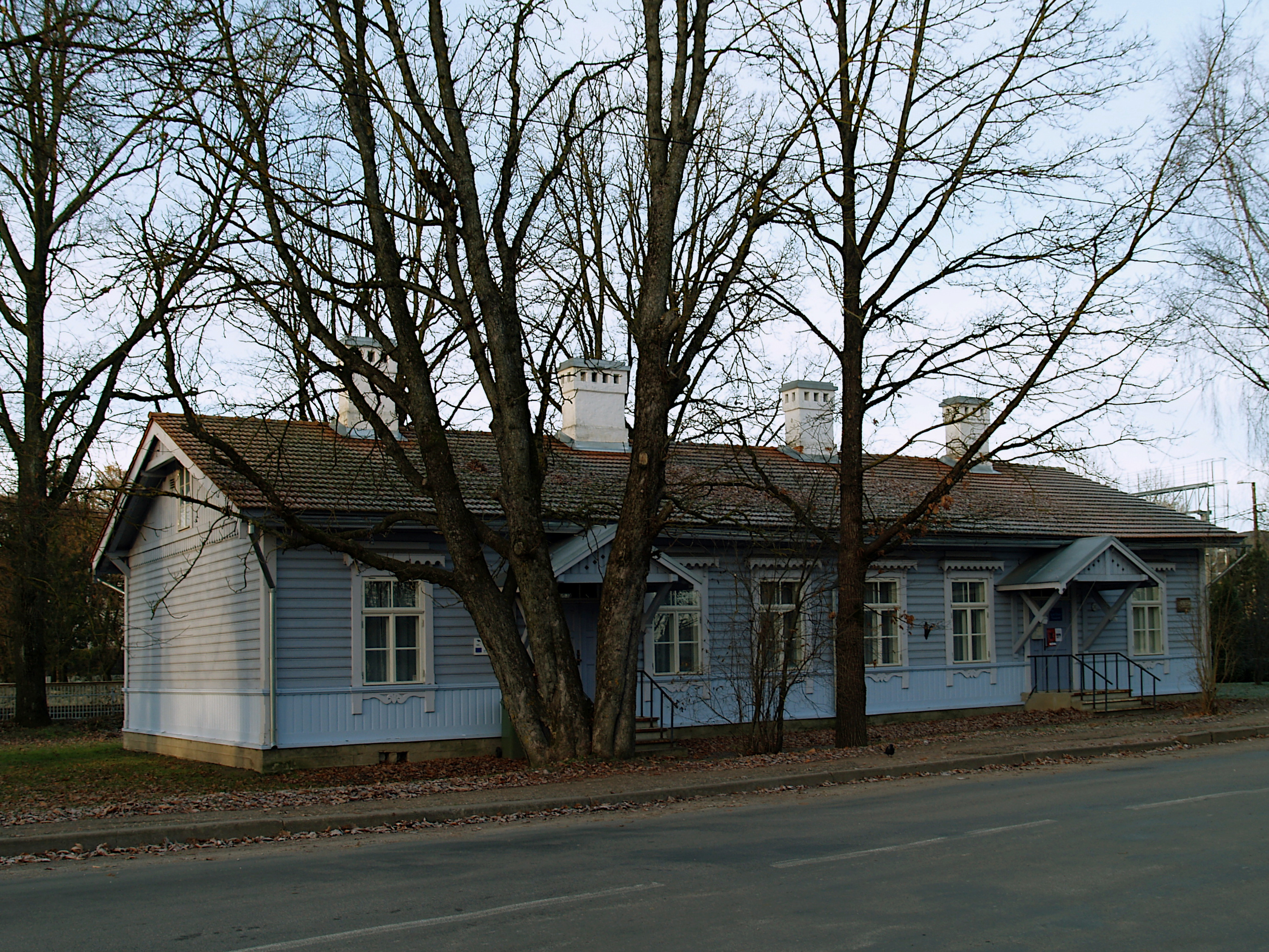
The Betti Alver Museum in Jõgeva

== Writing ==
She began as a prose writer. She became known for being a member of the Arbujad ("Soothsayers"), a small group of influential Estonian poets including Bernard Kangro, Uku Masing, Kersti Merilaas, Mart Raud, August Sang, Heiti Talvik and Paul Viiding. After the war her husband Heiti Talvik was imprisoned by the Soviets and died in Siberia. For two or three decades she was silent as a poet as protest of Soviet rule, but renewed activity in the 1960s. Of note in this second period is the 1966 collection Tähetund or "Starry Hour". She also wrote novels and did translation work. On the hundredth anniversary of her birth a museum was dedicated to her in Jõgeva.
