= Villem Grünthal-Ridala =

Estonian writer, linguist and folklorist

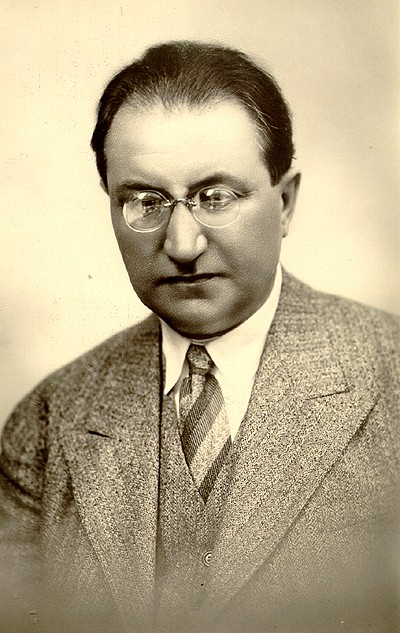
- Born: Wilhelm Grünthal; 30 May 1885; Kuivastu, Muhu, Kreis Ösel, Governorate of Livonia, Russian Empire
- Died: 16 January 1942 (aged 56); Helsinki, Finland
- Education: University of Helsinki
- Writing career
- Literary movement: Young Estonia

Villem Grünthal-Ridala, born Wilhelm Grünthal (30 May 1885 in Kuivastu, Muhu, Kreis Ösel, Governorate of Livonia – 16 January 1942 in Helsinki, Finland) was an Estonian poet, translator, linguist and folklorist.

== Life ==
Villem Grünthal-Ridala was the son of an innkeeper on the island of Muhu. He first attended Hellamaa (Pühalepa) parish school, then Eisenschmidt private school, as well as the national high school in Kuressaare. Beginning in 1905, he studied Finnish literature at the University of Helsinki. In 1911, he completed his doctorate.

From 1910 to 1919, Grünthal-Ridala was a professor at the University of Tartu in Estonia. From 1910 until 1914, he edited the magazine Eesti Kirjandus (Estonian Literature), as well as Üliõpilaste Leht (The Student Newspaper) from 1914 to 1916.

From 1923 until his death, Grünthal-Ridala was a professor of Estonian language and literature at the University of Helsinki. In 1941, he received a doctorate in Finnic languages.

== Lyrical poet ==
Villem Grünthal-Ridala had become renowned for his poems in the Estonian language. His epic Toomas ja Mai (1924), as well as a collection of ballads, Sinine kari (1930), served as a model for the Estonian poetry of the time. The poems are influenced by Impressionism, with the landscapes of his island homeland and life by the sea being the primary motifs. He belonged to the Estonian literary movement Young Estonia (Noor-Eesti), founded in 1905.

== Selected Poems ==
- "Villem Grünthali laulud" (1908)
- "Kauged rannad" (1914)
- "Ungru krahv ehk Näckmansgrund" (1915)
- "Merineitsit" (1918)
- "Saarnak" (1918)
- "Toomas ja Mai" (1924)
- "Tuules ja tormis" (1927)
- "Sinine kari" (1930)
- "Meretäht" (1935)
- "Laulud ja kauged rannad" (1938)
- "Väike luuleraamat" (1969)
- "Valitud värsid" (1986)
- "Püha Rist" (2005; ISBN 9949-13-275-4)
