= Artur Alliksaar =

Estonian poet

Artur Alliksaar (15 April 1923 – 12 August 1966) was an Estonian poet.

== Biography ==
Alliksaar (formerly Alnek) was born in Tartu and attended elementary school there in 1931. In 1937, he enrolled in the prestigious secondary school: the Hugo Treffner Gymnasium. Afterwards, he worked for the railway, like his father, for a short period of time in 1942. That same year, he started to study law at the University of Tartu.

In 1943–1944, he served as a conscript in the Estonian Legion of Waffen-SS. In 1944, he saw combat on the Eastern Front against the Red Army. After the Soviet occupation, he joined the underground as a Forest Brother.

Eventually, he returned to Tartu and again worked for the railway.

In 1949, the Soviet authorities arrested him for abusing his position. The charges were dubious. Alliksaar believes they were politically motivated. In 1954, he was also charged with betraying the homeland. Upon his release, in 1957, Alliksaar was not allowed to return to Estonia and lived in the Vologda oblast. In 1958, he secretly returned to Tartu and worked in a brewery, in construction and for the railway. He also dedicated himself to creative writing.

Artur Alliksaar suffered much injustice under Soviet authority. In addition to imprisonment, his house was burned down and he was forced to live in a shed with a dirt floor while his wife and son suffered with pneumonia.

Alliksaar died of colon cancer in 1966 in Tartu.

== Creative life ==
In his poetry, Alliksaar celebrates individual freedom. His poems are considered to be innovative and critical of his era. Most of his poems are written in free verse and are known to be full of wordplay.

Few of Alliksaar's poems were published during his lifetime. He wrote one play, Nimetu Saar (Nameless Island), which he lived to see in print. The complete collection of his poems, Päikesepillaja (Lavishing Sunshine), was published in 1997, and became a bestseller. He also translated poetry.

== Sources ==
- Alliksaar, Artur (2004). Päikesepillaja. Ilmamaa. ISBN 9985-77-116-8.
- Jaanson, Kaido. "Artur Alliksaar". Archived from the original on 2007-07-10.
- Juske, Ants. "Pole paremaid, halvemaid aegu…". Archived from the original on 2012-08-29.
- "Authors and translators". Archived from the original on February 8, 2007.
