= Mehis Heinsaar =

Estonian writer (born 1973)

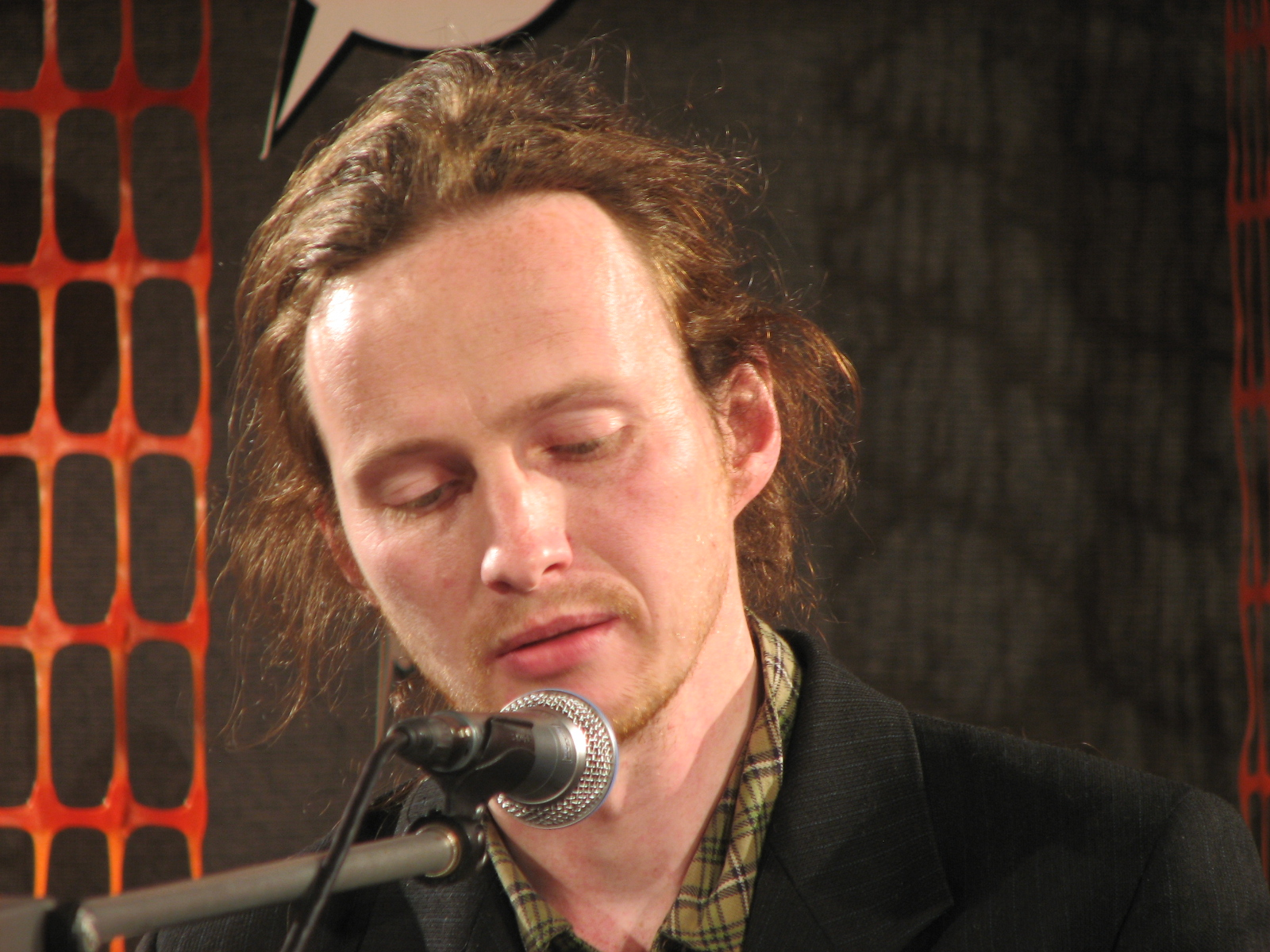
Mehis Heinsaa (2011)

Mehis Heinsaar (born 1 August 1973) is an Estonian writer. He has mainly written short stories. His stories represent the style of magical realism.

He has won many awards, for example, the Friedebert Tuglas Short Story Award three times (2000, 2002, 2010).

== Works ==
- 2001: short story collection "Vanameeste näppaja" ('The Snatcher of Old Men')
- 2001: short story collection "Härra Pauli kroonikad" ('The Chronicles of Mr. Paul')
- 2007: short story collection "Rändaja õnn" ('The Traveller's Happiness')
