= Jürgen Rooste =

Estonian poet

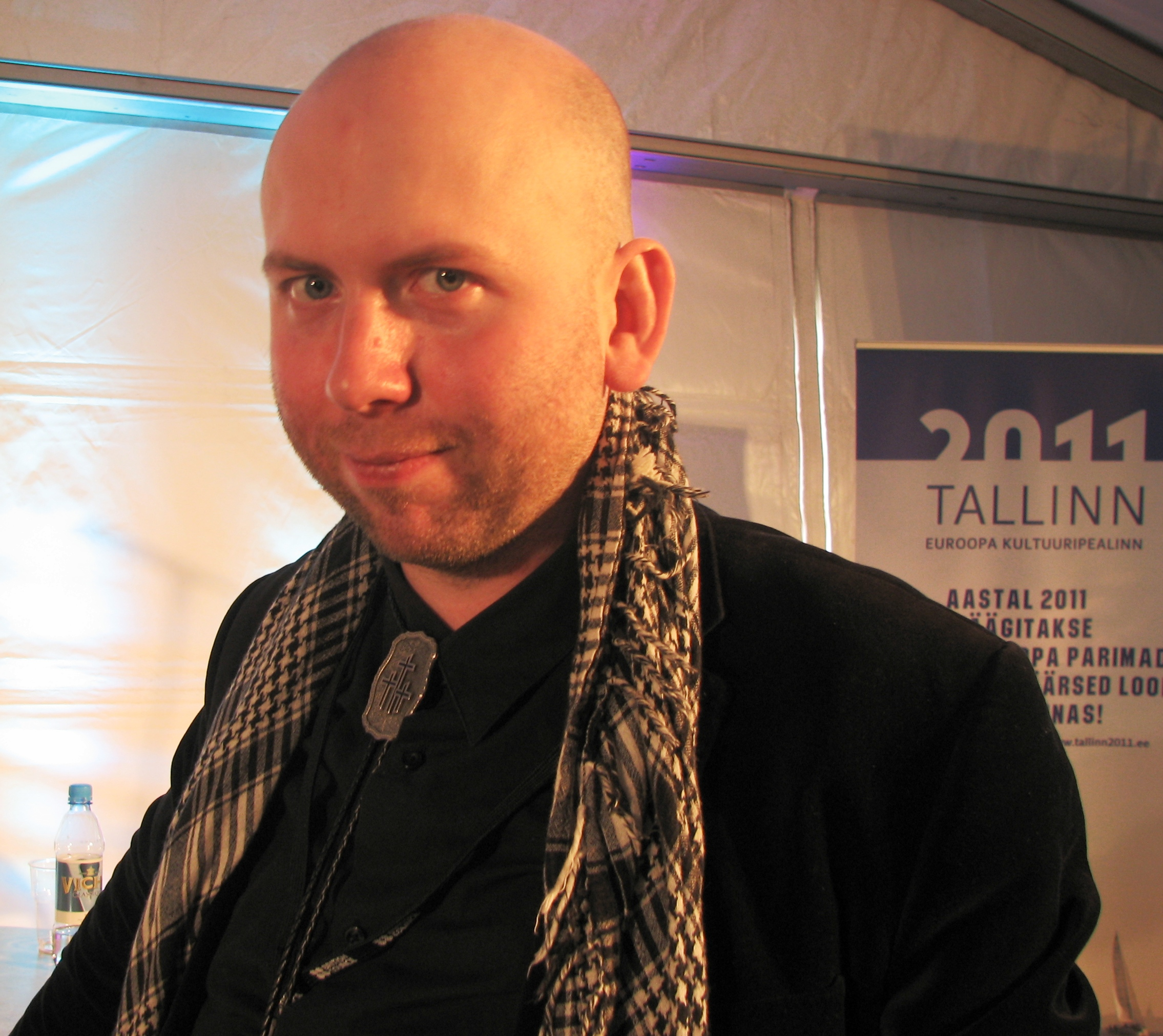
Jürgen Rooste

Jürgen Rooste (born in 1979 in Tallinn) is an Estonian poet.

He graduated from Tallinn Pedagogical University with a degree in Estonian.

Awards:

- 1999: Betti Alver Award

== Works ==
- 1999: poetry collection Sonetid ('Sonnets')
- 2000: poetry collection Veri valla
- 2002: poetry collection Lameda taeva all
- 2003: poetry collection Rõõm ühest koledast päevast
