= Ivar Ivask =

Estonian poet and literary scholar (1927-1992)

Ivar Vidrik Ivask (December 17, 1927 Riga, Latvia – September 23, 1992 Fountainstown, Ireland) was an Estonian poet and literary scholar.

He escaped in 1944 from Estonia to Germany and lived from 1949 onward in the United States and from 1991 in Ireland.

He worked as a professor of modern languages and literatures at the University of Oklahoma, writing mainly on Spanish-language literature.

From 1967 to 1991 he was the editor-in-chief of the international literary quarterly World Literature Today (formerly Books Abroad) and directed its two affiliated biennial literary programs, the Neustadt International Prize for Literature (1970–) and the Puterbaugh Conferences on Writers of the French-Speaking and Hispanic World (1968–), later known as the Puterbaugh Conference on World Literature.

Ivask was married to Latvian poet and translator Astrid Ivask (1926–2015). He died in Fountainstown, Ireland in 1992.
