= Jaan Isotamm =

Estonian poet (1939–2014)

Jaan Isotamm (pseudonym Johnny B. Isotamm; 19 October 1939 in Tartu – 2 June 2014) was an Estonian poet.

In 1956 he was imprisoned for participation in an anti-Soviet underground youth organization. He was sent to a labor camp in the Mordovian ASSR. In 1963, he was released, and he moved to Tartu. From 1969 to 1988 he worked as a night-watchman. From 1988 to 2003, he worked for the journal Akadeemia.

== Works ==
- 1972: poetry collection "Tekstiraamat. Luuletusi 1967-1970"
- 1999: poetry collection "Mina - Johnny B. Tekste aastaist 1967-1974"

== Literature ==
- Jaan Isotamm, Nägija pimedate maal. Artikleid, intervjuusid, sõnavõtte. Compiled by Katrin Raid ja Mart Orav. Tartu: Ilmamaa, 2015, 776 pages.
