= Karl Martin Sinijärv =

Estonian journalist and poet (born 1971)

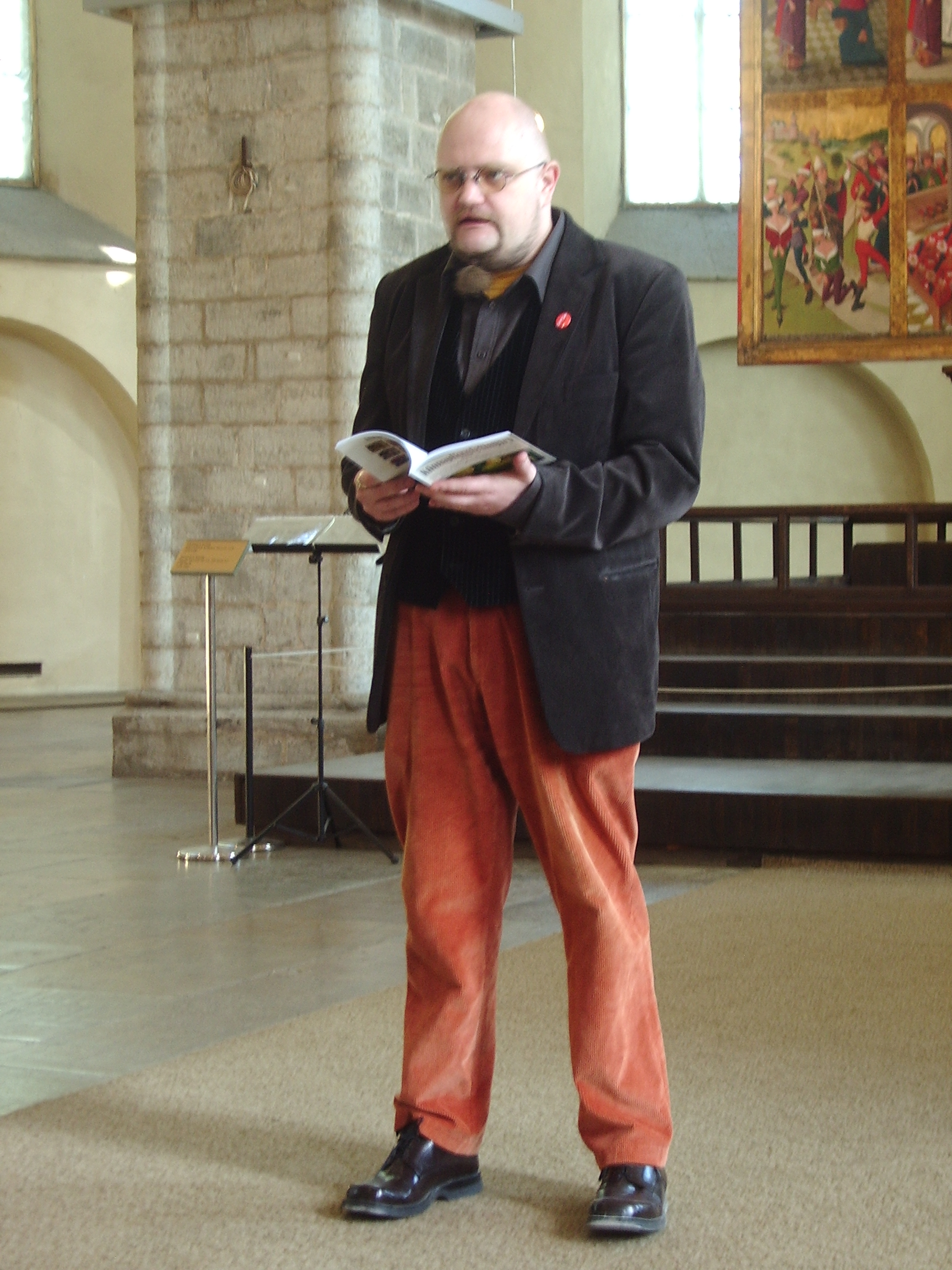
- Karl Martin Sinijärv performing in Niguliste church during Tallinn Literature Festival
- Born: 4 June 1971 (age 55); Tallinn

Karl Martin Sinijärv (born 4 June 1971) is an Estonian journalist and poet.

Sinijärv was born in Tallinn. By 2011, he had published 8 poetry books and a cookbook. His poetry has been characterized as etnofuturist, bringing estrangement of language to the brink of self-parody. Sinijärv's first book of poems was published in 1989 in a collection with three other poetry books by Tõnu Trubetsky, Ringo Ringvee and Märt Väljataga.

Sinijärv has written numerous articles in media. He has also been the anchor of culture shows "OP!" and "Jüri Üdi klubi" in Estonian public television channel Eesti Televisioon for more than 10 years.

Sinijärv was the chairman of the Estonian Writers' Union from 2007–2016.

Karl Martin Sinijärv is the son of politician and diplomat Riivo Sinijärv. His grandfather was futurist and socialist poet Erni Hiir.

== Books ==
- "Kolmring", poems (1989)
- "Vari ja viisnurk", poems (1991)
- "Sürway", poems (1992)
- "Neli sada keelt", poems (1997)
- "Poissmehe kokaraamat", ("Bachelor's cookbook", 2000)
- "Towntown & 28", poems (2000)
- "Artutart ja 39", poems (2002)
- "Kaamose kiuste", poems (2004)
- "Krümitor 0671", poems (2011)
