= Ants Oras =

Estonian translator and writer

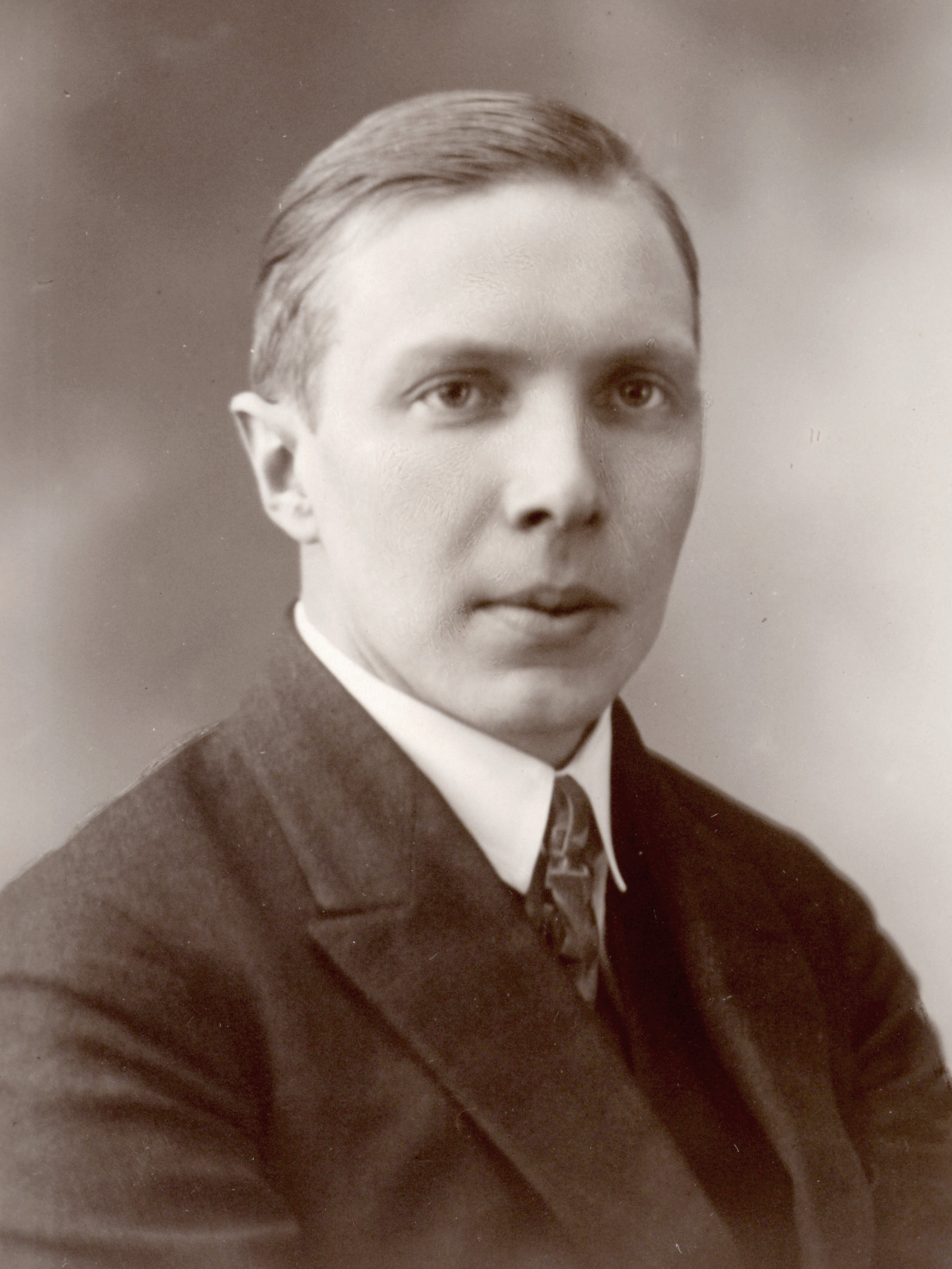
Oras in the 1930s

Ants Oras (8 December 1900 – 21 December 1982) was an Estonian translator and writer.

Oras was born in Tallinn and studied at the University of Tartu, graduating with a Master of Philosophy degree in 1923. He also obtained a Bachelor of Literature degree from Oxford University.

From 1928 through 1934, he was a lecturer at both Tartu and Helsinki University. Between 1934 and 1943 he was a professor at Tartu. Oras fled to Sweden in 1943 during World War II and the German occupation of Estonia, then to England in 1949, then on to the United States where he settled in Gainesville, Florida. From 1957 to 1958 he was a visiting professor at Helsinki University, and in 1965 he became a US State Department visiting lecturer in Sweden. In 1972 he became professor of English at the University of Florida in Gainesville and received an honorary doctorate from that university in 1975. He died in Gainesville, Florida, aged 82.

Ants Oras was the author of several books, including one on the works of John Milton, as well as an account of the Occupation of the Baltic states titled The Baltic Eclipse. He also translated Shakespeare, Goethe (including Faust), Pushkin, Virgil, Alexander Pope and Molière into Estonian, as well as many Estonian works into English, German, Swedish, French and Spanish.

== Oras' pause test ==
Oras investigated pause patterns in English Renaissance dramatic blank verse, based on the hypothesis that a pause in iambic pentameter fell on one of nine possible positions (after the first syllable, after the second syllable, etc.) in unconscious patterns unique to each playwright, and that the patterns would change over time. He counted three types of pauses: those indicated by commas in the first extant printed edition; pauses indicated by punctuation other than commas; and the breaks caused by splitting a line between two speakers. These pause patterns, when used to put the works of Early Modern dramatists in chronological order, correlate well with other indicators and are generally accepted as valid and reliable by most textual scholars.

== Works ==
- The Critical Ideas of TS Eliot, Tartu, 1932
- Baltic Eclipse, Gollancz, London, 1948
- Laiemasse ringi: kirjanduslikke perspektiive ja profiile (artiklikogumik). Vaba Eesti, Stockholm 1961
- Marie Under (lühimonograafia). Eesti Kirjanike Kooperatiiv, Lund 1963
- Estonian literature in exile (an essay by Ants Oras; with a bio-bibliographical appendix by Bernard Kangro). Eesti Kirjanike Kooperatiiv, Lund 1967
