= Heiti Talvik =

Estonian poet

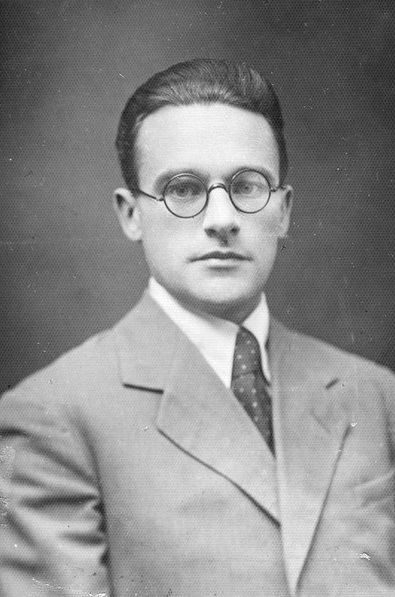
- Born: 9 November 1904; Tartu, Kreis Dorpat, Governorate of Livonia, Russian Empire
- Died: 18 July 1947 (aged 42); Tyumen Oblast, Russian SFSR, Soviet Union
- Occupation: Poet
- Years active: 1934–1945
- Spouse: Betti Alver (1937–1945)

Signature
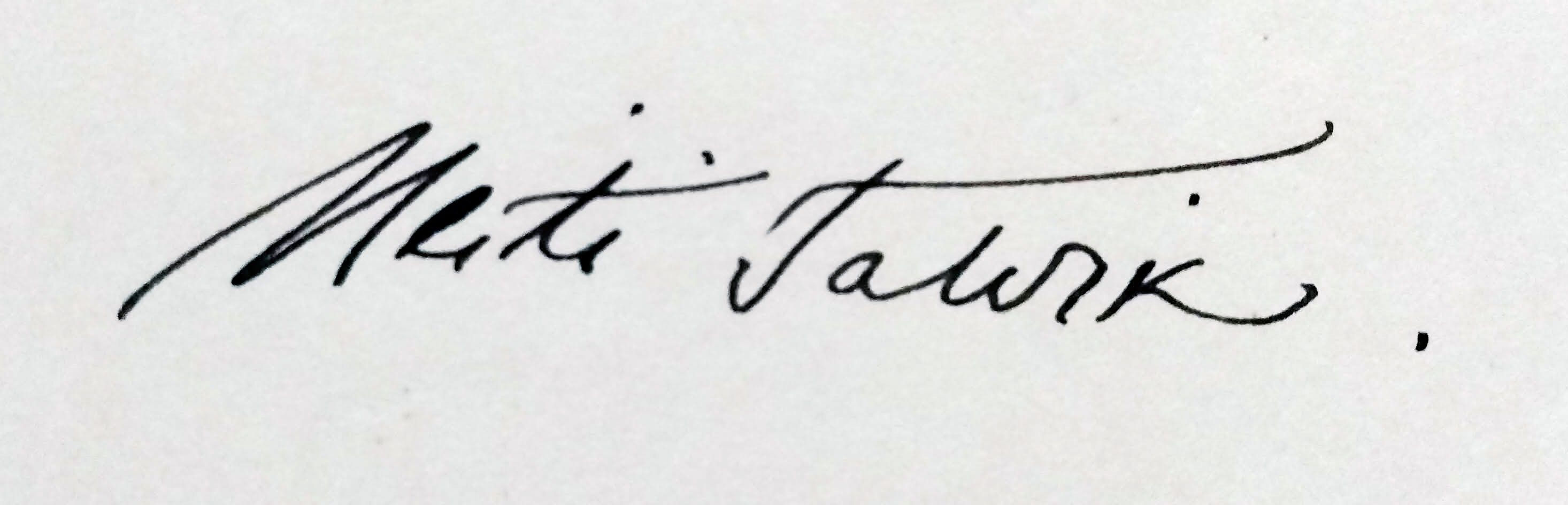

Heiti Talvik (9 November 1904 – 18 July 1947) was an Estonian poet.

== Life and literary career ==
Heiti Talvik's father was a family doctor based in Tartu and his mother was a pianist. In 1923 he left the school early and initially sought work in oil shale mining at Kohtla-Järve. During that time he wrote poetry which was published in the literary magazine Looming (Creation), then edited by Friedebert Tuglas.

In 1926 he completed his study at a gymnasium (secondary school) in Pärnu. After his graduation he studied at the Philosophical Faculty of the University of Tartu from 1926 to 1934.

After 1928, Talvik dedicated himself more and more to poetry. In 1934, after the publication of the poetry collection Palavik (Fever), he became one of the most famous Estonian poets and a member of the writers group Arbujad (Shaman). The circle included the poet Betti Alver, who married Talvik in 1937.

With the occupation of Estonia by the Soviet Union, Heiti Talvik was deported to Siberia in May 1945, never to be heard of again. He probably died in July 1947 as a consequence of the deportation, the location of his grave being unknown.

== Poetry collections ==
- Palavik (1934)
- Kohtupäev (1937)
