= Bernard Kangro =

Estonian writer and poet (1910–1994)

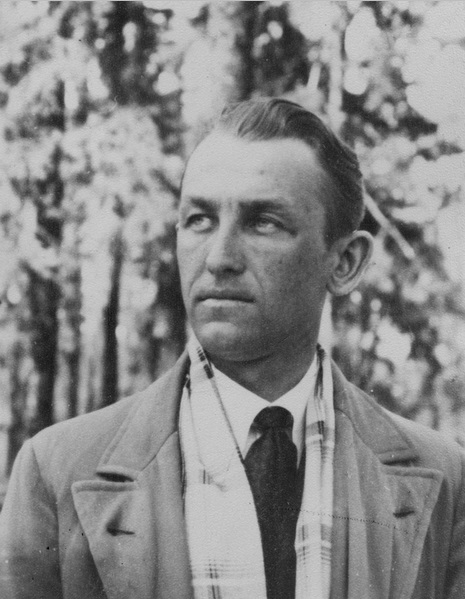
- Born: 18 September 1910; Oe, Võru County, Governorate of Livonia, Russian Empire
- Died: 25 March 1994 (aged 83); Lund, Scania, Sweden
- Other names: Antsla Pännu; Herbert Viipilt; Joonas Taavet; Josef Tsaxtinis; Kroonik; Oskar Jooniste; Taavet Valler
- Occupations: Writer, poet
- Years active: 1935–1994

Bernard Kangro (18 September 1910 – 25 March 1994) was an Estonian writer and poet.

== Education ==
Bernard Kangro was born the son of a farmer, Andres Kangro, and his wife, Minna. He grew up in rather humble circumstances. He attended primary school from 1919 to 1922 the primary school in Kiltre, then a school in Antsla (1922 to 1924) and finally from 1924 to 1929 the high school in Valga. From 1929 to 1938 he studied Estonian language and literature at the University of Tartu.

== Career ==
In 1935 Bernard Kangro made his debut with the collection of poems Sonetid. Other volumes of poetry followed. From 1938 Kangro was a member of the artist group Arbujad (shamans), who strived towards a deeper emotional and spiritual experience of the language. Kangro worked as a journalist too, for the publication Eesti Sona in 1942 and Puhkus ja elurõõm in 1943. 1943/44 he worked at the Vanemuine theater in Tartu as a dramatist. In 1941 he also worked as an assistant and from 1942 to 1944 as a lecturer in literature at the University of Tartu.

Before the Soviet occupation in 1944, he was forced to flee into exile in Sweden. There, Bernard Kangro was one of the most prominent writers and journalists in exile. Initially he worked as an archivist in Karlstad, then from 1947 as a research assistant at the University of Lund. From 1950 until his death he was editor and publisher of the Estonian cultural magazine Tulimuld and from 1951 the Director of the Eesti Kirjanike Kooperatiiv (Estonian Writers' Cooperative).

Bernard Kangro has written numerous novels and volumes of poetry. Key themes center on country life in South Estonia and Tartu. In his poetry he used a creative, often symbolic language, where the mood alternates between irony, joy and also resignation.

== Works ==
Collections of poetry "Sonetid" (1935) "Vanad majad" (1937) "Reheahi" (1939) "Põlenud puu" (1945) "Pühapäev" (1946) "Seitsmes öö" (1947) "Tulease" (1949) "Veebruar" (1951) "Eikellegi maa" (1952) "Suvihari" (1955) "September" (1964) "Varjumaa" (1966) "Allikad silla juures" (1972) "Hingetuisk. Jääminek" (1988)

== Anthologies ==
"Ajatu mälestus" (1960) "Minu nägu" (1970) "Kogutud luuletused" (1991) "Kojukutsuv hääl" (2000)

== Novels ==
"Igatsetud maa" (1949) "Kuma taevarannal" (1950) "Peipsi" (1954) "Taeva võtmed" (1956) "Sinine värav" (1957) "Jäälätted" (1957) "Emajõgi (1961) "Tartu (1962) "Kivisild (1963) "Must raamat (1965) "Keeristuli" (1969) "Joonatan, kadunud veli" (1971) "Öö astmes x" (1973) "Puu saarel on alles" (1973) "Kuus päeva" (1980) "Seitsmes päev" (1984)

== Essays, memories ==
"Arbujad" (1981) "Kipitai" (1992) "Härjanädalate aegu" (1994) "Üks sündmusteta suvi" (1998)

== Literature ==
Kruus, Oskar: Bernard Kangro: Elukäik ja looming. Tallinn: Eesti Raamat 2003
