= Tarapita =

Estonian literary group

Tarapita was an Estonian literature group that was active between 1921 and 1922.

Tarapita has its own newspaper, Tarapita.

== Members of Tarapita ==
- Albert Kivikas
- Johannes Semper
- Marie Under
- Artur Adson
- Johannes Vares-Barbarus
- Friedebert Tuglas
- August Alle
- Jaan Kärner
- Aleksander Tassa

== See also ==
- Siuru
