= Marie Under =

Estonian poet (1883–1980)

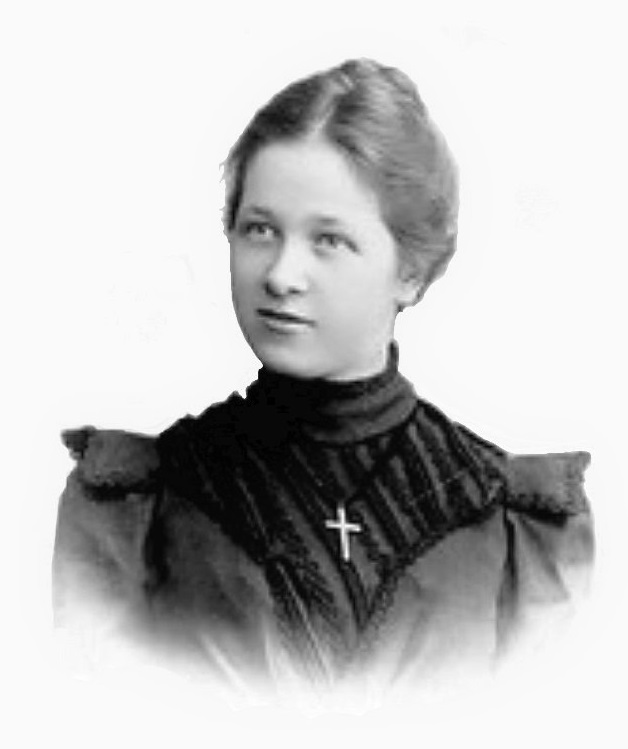
- Marie Under c. 1899.
- Born: 27 March 1883; Reval (Tallinn), Estonia, Russian Empire
- Died: 25 September 1980 (aged 97); Stockholm, Sweden
- Resting place: Rahumäe Cemetery
- Occupation: Poet
- Spouses: Carl Hacker (m. 1902; div. 1924) Artur Adson (m. 1924; died 1977)
- Children: Dagmar Stock (1902–1994); Hedda Hacker (1905–1988)
- Writing career
- Language: Estonian
- Movements: Siuru, Tarapita

Marie Under (27 March [O.S. 15 March] 1883 – 25 September 1980) was an Estonian poet. She was nominated for the Nobel Prize in Literature 18 times in 16 separate years.

== Early life ==
Marie Under was born on 27 March 1883 in Reval (Tallinn), Estonia to school teachers Friedrich (1843–1930) and Leena Under (née Kerner) (1854–1934). She had two older siblings, Evangeline (1880–1932?) and Gottried (1881–1882) and two younger, Berta (1885–1974), and Christfried (1887–1934). She attended a private German-language girls' school. After graduating, she worked as a salesclerk in a bookstore. In her free time, she wrote poetry in German. In 1902, she married an Estonian accountant, Carl Hacker. The couple had two children, Dagmar and Hedda, while living in Kuchino, a suburb of Moscow, Russia. However, in 1904, she fell in love with the Estonian artist Ants Laikmaa. Laikmaa convinced her to translate her poetry into Estonian and submitted her translated works to local newspapers.

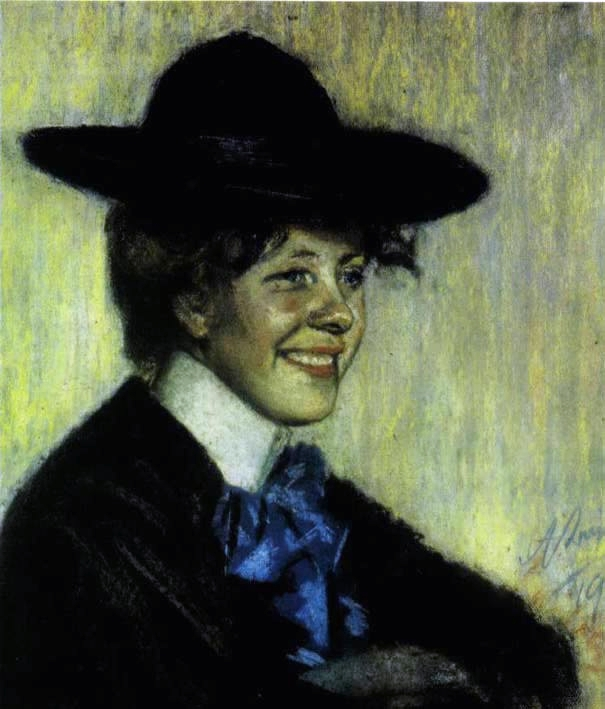
Portrait of Marie Under by Estonian artist Ants Laikmaa in 1904

== Return to Estonia ==
In 1904, under the pseudonym Mutti, Under had her first poem published in the newspaper Postimees.

In 1906, Under returned to Tallinn. In 1913, she met Artur Adson, who became her secretary. He also compiled the first volumes of her published poetry. In 1924, Under divorced Carl Hacker and married Adson.

In May 1917, Under was one of the writers who formed the influential Siuru literary group with Adson, Friedebert Tuglas, August Gailit, Henrik Visnapuu, and later Johannes Semper. Under was the only woman of the group, where she was known as Printsess, in line with the nicknames given to each member. She was appointed the group's chairman, intentionally taking on a masculine title. The group was named after a fire-bird in Finnic mythology, and it was an expressionistic and neo-romantic movement that ran counter to the Young Estonia formalist tradition. From 1917 to 1919, the group of poets published three volumes of poetry. In 1919, conflicts within the group led Visnapuu and Gailit to leave, while Johannes Vares and August Alle joined as new members.

Under published her first collection of poetry in 1917, shortly after forming Siuru, and a second edition was printed before the year's end. She then gained wider recognition, marking her entry into the literary scene. Notably, her work included explicit erotic poems, a departure from prevailing norms, which garnered attention and inspired subsequent writers.

Under was one of the founders of Estonian Writers' Union in 1922.

In the 1920s, Under was a frequent visitor at the house of Igor Severyanin, a Russian poet, in the village of Toila, where she often was on holiday. Severyanin published a book of translations from Under. Severyanin did not speak Estonian and used word-by-word translations as a basis.

== Life in exile ==
During World War II, Under and her family fled to Sweden in September 1944 to escape from the Soviet invasion and reoccupation of Estonia. They spent almost a year in a refugee camp until, in 1945, the family moved on to Mälarhöjden, a suburb of Stockholm, Sweden. Under lived there until her death on 25 September 1980. She was buried in the Skogskyrkogården cemetery in Stockholm. In January 2015, it was announced that she was to be reburied in Estonia. On 9 June 2016, Under and Adson were interred at Rahumäe Cemetery in Tallinn alongside her daughter Hedda Hacker and sister Berta.

== Translations ==
Under's work was translated into at least 26 languages. She is one of the most translated Estonian authors.

- Russian by Igor Severyanin.
- Komi by Nina Obrezkova (2008).
- Udmurt by Nadezhda Pchelovodova (Nadi Mush, 2006).

== Style ==
The ocean's mysteries were a common theme in Under's poetry. Having grown up as the symbolism movement was ending, Under was one of the European poets who rejected symbolism in favor of more tangible concepts. Her early poetry was specifically about sensory ideas and how things appear in the physical world. Her poetry shifted to existential concepts of isolation and death by 1920. A change in tone developed in the late 1920s as she shifted again to appreciation and concern for life and wellbeing rather than simple despair knowing that they shall end. With this shift came a greater willingness to use symbolism and metaphor in her poetry. Her influences included the Bible, William Shakespeare, Johann Wolfgang von Goethe, Fyodor Dostoevsky, and traditional folk legends.

== Poetry collections ==
- 1917 – Sonetid (Sonnets)
- 1918 – Eelõitseng (Early Flowering)
- 1918 – Sinine puri (Blue Sail)
- 1920 – Verivalla (A Flowing of Blood)
- 1923 – Pärisosa (Heritage)
- 1927 – Hääl varjust (Voice From the Shadows)
- 1928 – Rõõm ühest ilusast päevast (The Joys of a Beautiful Day)
- 1929 – Õnnevarjutus (Eclipse of Happiness)
- 1930 – Lageda taeva all (Under the Open Sky)
- 1935 – Kivi südamelt (Stone of the Heart)
- 1942 – Mureliku suuga (With an Anxious Mouth)
- 1954 – Sädemed tuhas (Sparks in the Ashes)
- 1963 – Ääremail (Borderlands)
- 1981 – Mu süda laulab (My Heart Sings)

== Gallery ==
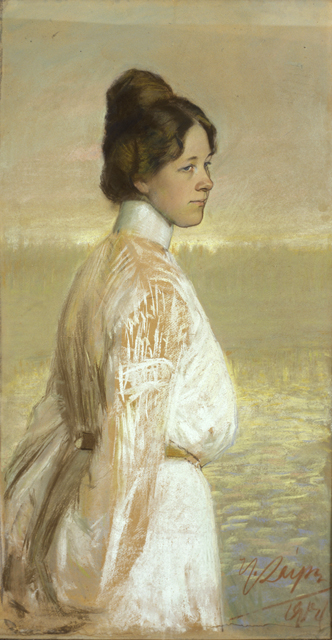
"Portrait of Marie Under" (1904), by Ants Laikmaa

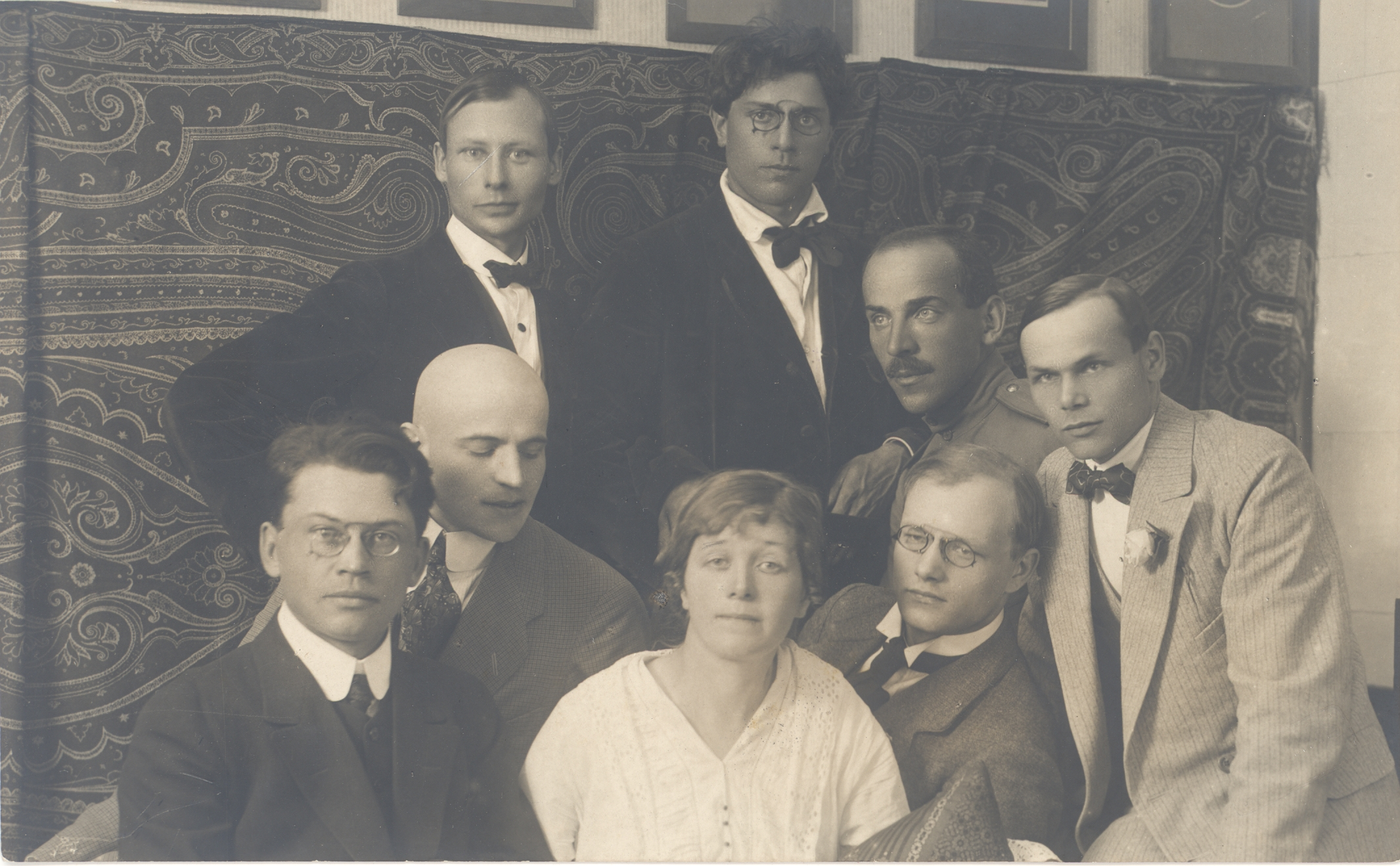
Members of the Estonian Siuru literary circle in 1917, rear: Peet Aren, Otto Krusten, and Johannes Semper. front row: Friedebert Tuglas, Artur Adson, Marie Under, August Gailit, and Henrik Visnapuu

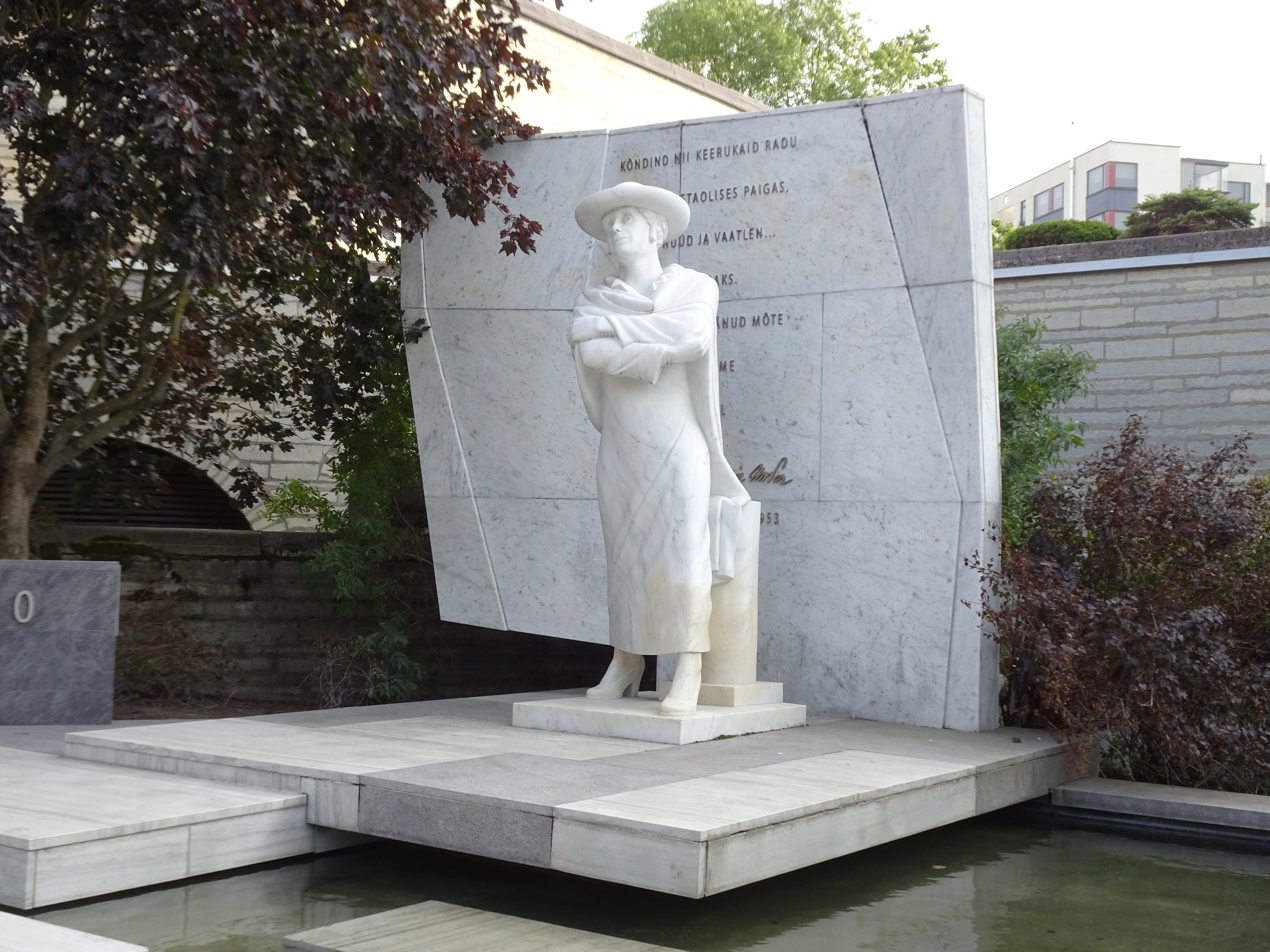
"Monument to Marie Under", created by Mati Karmin and Tiit Trummal, unveiled in 2010 in front of the National Library of Estonia in Tallinn

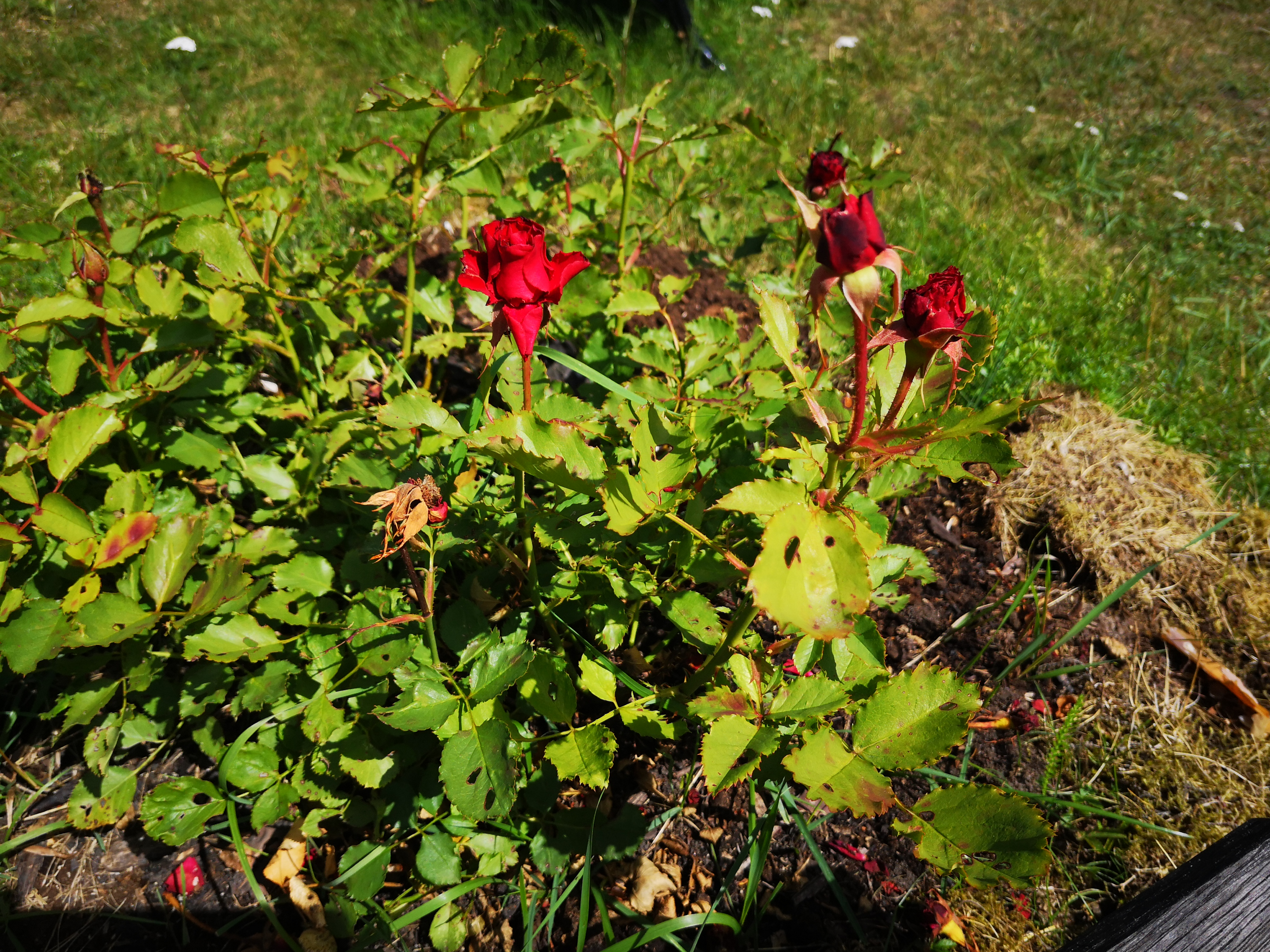
Rosa 'Marie Under', a rose cultivar created by Aune Mark, Kärt Soans and Lea Eermann in 2007 and named in Under's honor
