= Rahumäe Cemetery =

Cemetery in Tallinn, Estonia

Rahumäe Cemetery Rahumäe kalmistu
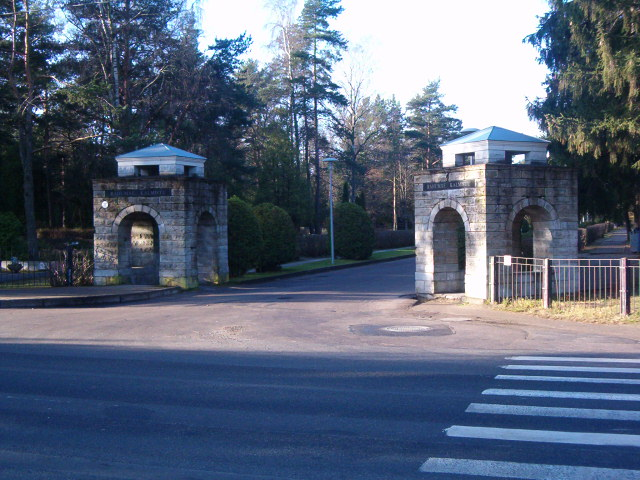
- The main entrance to Rahumäe Cemetery
- Interactive map of Rahumäe Cemetery; Rahumäe kalmistu

Details
- Established: 1903
- Location: Tallinn
- Country: Estonia
- Coordinates: 59°23′31″N 24°42′18″E
- Website: Official site

Rahumäe Cemetery (Estonian: Rahumäe kalmistu) is a cemetery located at Rahumäe in Nõmme District, Tallinn, Estonia. This municipal cemetery was established in 1903 on 29 hectares of land to meet the needs of the growing population of Tallinn. A number of congregations are present including a Jewish section established in 1911. This forested cemetery is notable for its many works by famous sculptures and chapels present within its grounds.

== Jewish section ==
The Jewish section (also called New Jewish Cemetery) was established in 1911. Its area is about 1 ha. In 2019, five unknown perpetrators pushed over five gravestones and spray painted a swastika nearby.

== Notable interments ==
- August Allik (1920–1962), Soviet military commander (et, ru)
- Ilmar Aluvee (1969–2013), ski jumper, biathlete and coach
- Gottlieb Ast (1874–1919), politician
- Vladimir Beekman (1929–2009), writer, poet and translator
- Paul Burman (1888–1934), painter and graphic artist (et, uk)
- Erika Esop (1927–1999), writer (et)
- Gunnar Graps (1951–2004), drummer and singer
- Juhan Jaik (1899–1948), writer and journalist
- Jens Christian Johansen (1868–1929), engineer and honorary consul
- Ernst Joll (1902–1935), football player and journalist (et)
- Jaan Kalviste (1898–1936), chemist, educator and translator
- Jaan Kiivit Sr. (1906–1971), clergyman
- Jaan Kiivit Jr. (1940–2005), clergyman
- August Kirsimägi (1905–1933), writer (et, de)
- Vilhelmine Klementi (1904–1929), communist politician (et, ru)
- Aleksander Klumberg (1899–1958), decathlete
- Jaan Koort (1883–1935), sculptor, ceramist and painter
- Jaan Kreuks (1891–1923), communist politician (et)
- Jaan Kross (1920–2007), writer
- Otto Krusten (1888–1937), caricaturist
- Peeter Kurvits (1891–1962), military commander, politician and economist (et)
- Jaanus Kuum (1964–1998), racing cyclist
- August Lass (1903–1962), footballer
- Teodor Lippmaa (1892–1943), botanist
- Uno Loop (1930–2021), singer, musician, music educator and athlete
- Georg Luiga (1866–1936), journalist and writer (et, fi)
- Olaf Luiga (1908–1939), weightlifter
- Jakob Mändmets (1871–1930), writer and journalist
- Konstantin Märska (1896–1951), film director
- Natalie Mei (1900–1975), painter and graphic artist
- Johannes Mülber (1889–1938), photographer and city official (et)
- Ellen Niit (1928–2016), children's writer, poet and translator
- Jaan Oks (1884–1918), writer (et, de)
- Evald Oldekop (1885–1952), hydrologist and biological philosopher (et)
- Velda Otsus (1913–2006), ballerina and stage actress
- Johannes-Georg Parikas (1880–1958), photographer (et)
- Endel Pärn (1914–1990), actor
- Artur Perna (1881–1940), architect and military commander (et, ru)
- Aleksander Pürge (1887–1940), politician, engineer, and military officer (lieutenant)
- Kristjan Raud (1865–1943), painter and draughtsman
- Paul Raud (1865–1930), painter
- Jakob Rosenberg (1881–1937), esperantist (et, de, eo)
- Jaan Rumma (1887–1926), geographer (et)
- Vello Saatpalu (1935–2013), engineer, politician, and sport sailor
- Elmar Salulaht (1910–1974), actor and opera singer
- Peep Sarapik (1949–1994), composer and choral conductor (et)
- Reinhold Saulmann (1895–1936), track and field sprinter
- Julius Seljamaa (1883–1936), politician, diplomat and journalist
- Venda Tammann (1932–2010), accordionist and music pedagogue (et, fi)
- Aleksander Tassa (1882–1955), painter and writer (et, de)
- Kalmer Tennosaar (1928–2004), singer and journalist
- Heinrich Tiidermann (1863–1904), photographer (et)
- Leopold Tõnson (1878–1935), athlete, rower and military commander (et)
- Toomas Uba (1943–2000), sports journalist (et)
- Marie Under (1883–1980), poet
- Agaate Veeber (1901–1988), graphic artist
- Kuno Veeber (1898–1929), painter and graphic artist
- Jakob Westholm (1877–1935), pedagogue

== Gallery ==
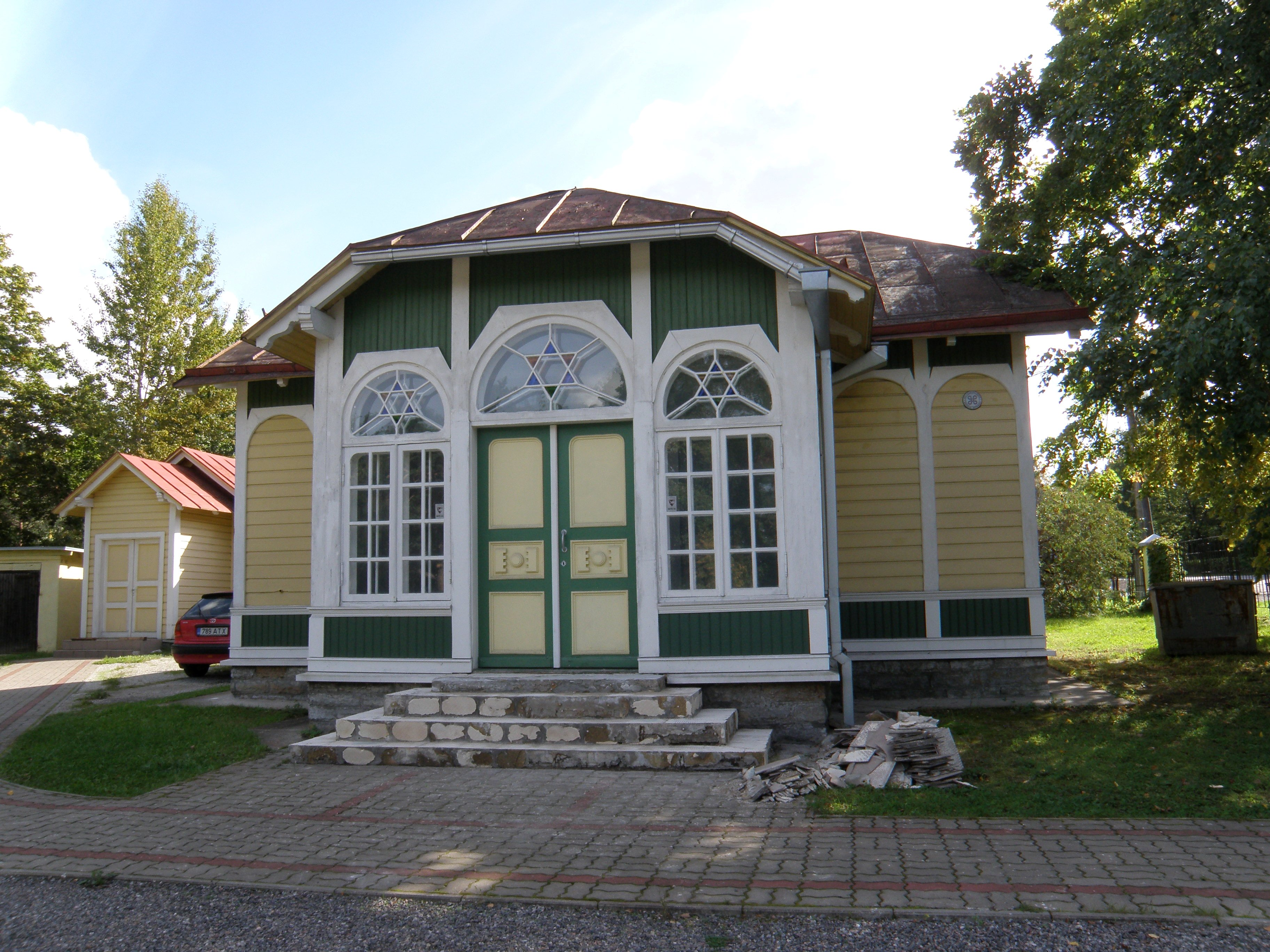
Chapel of the Jewish cemetery

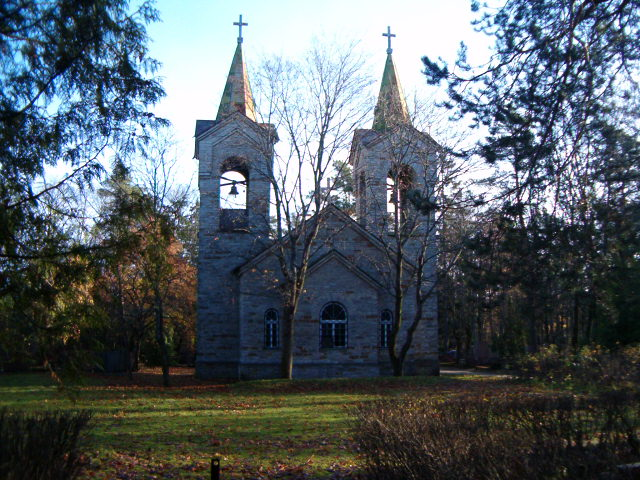
Chapel of the Charles' congregation

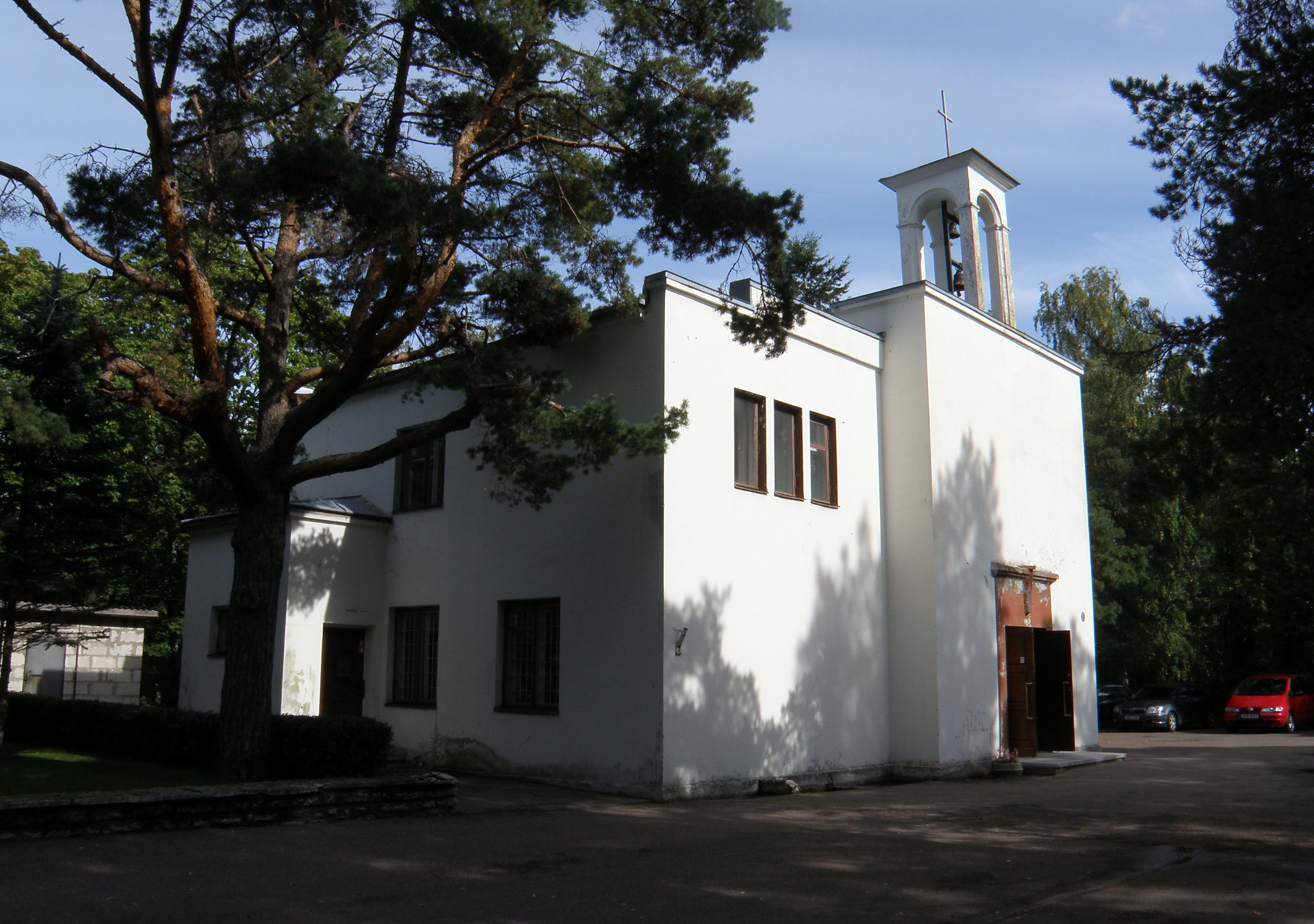
Chapel of the Holy Ghost congregation

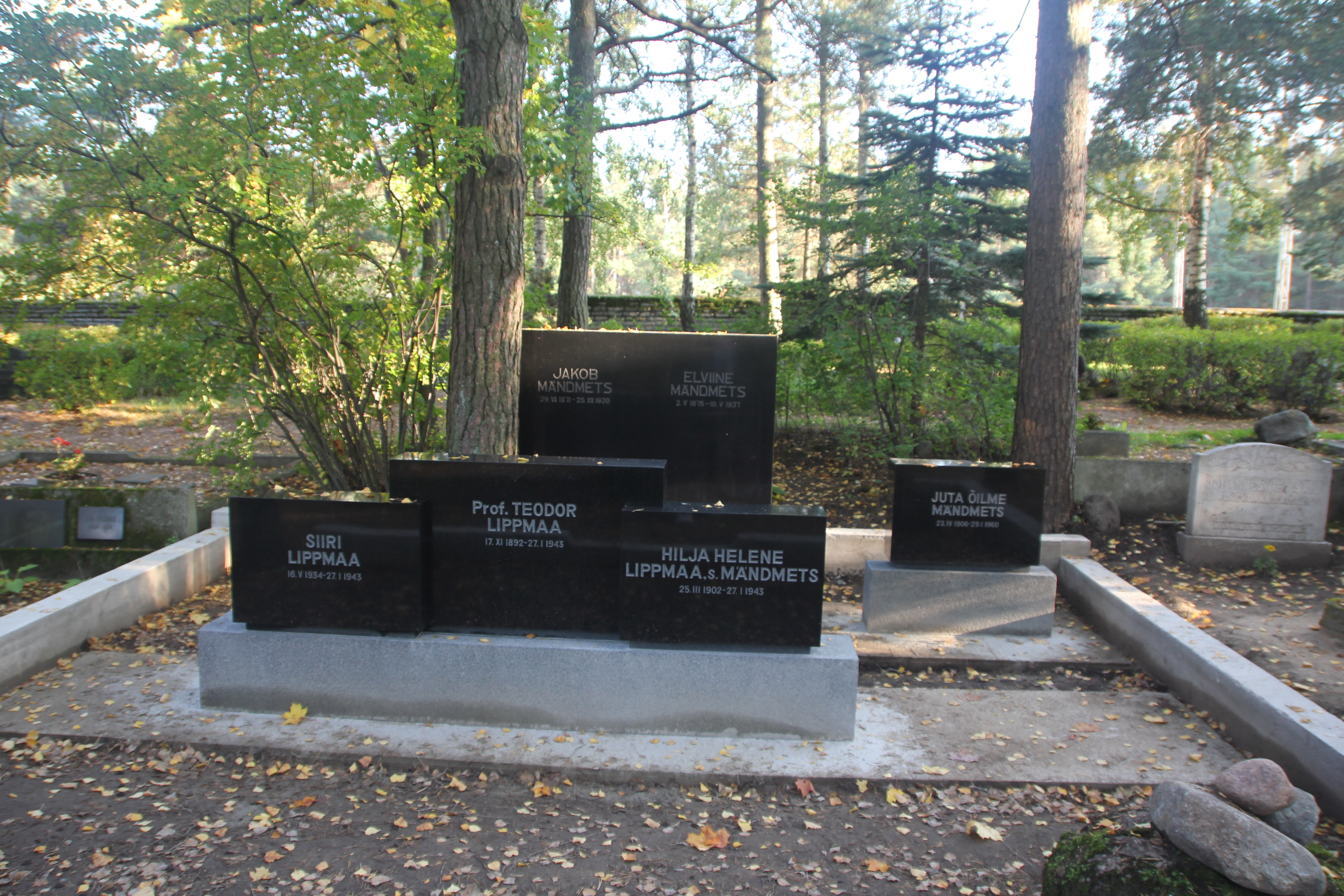
Grave of Teodor Lippmaa, Jakob Mändmets and their family members.

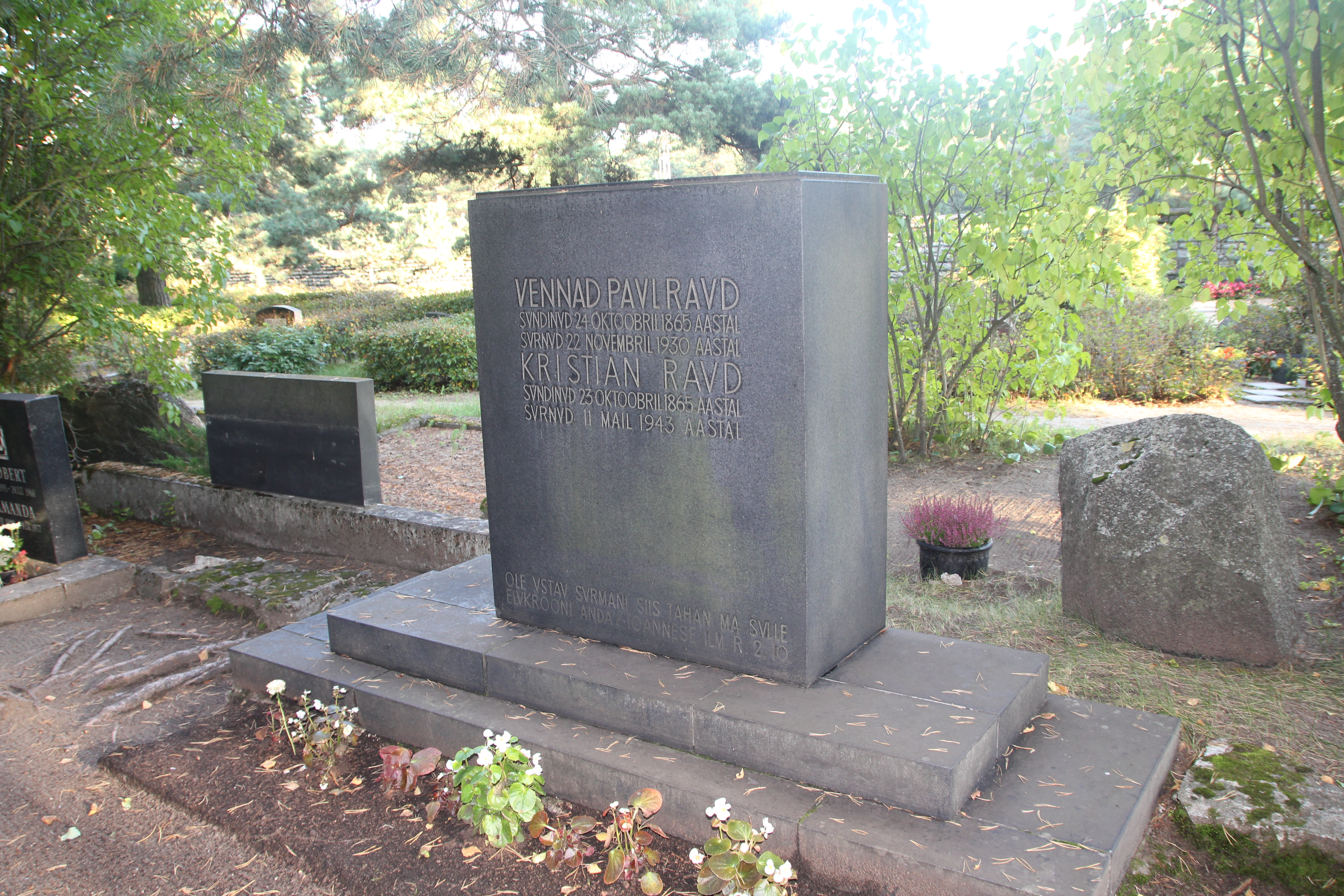
Grave of Kristjan and Paul Raud.

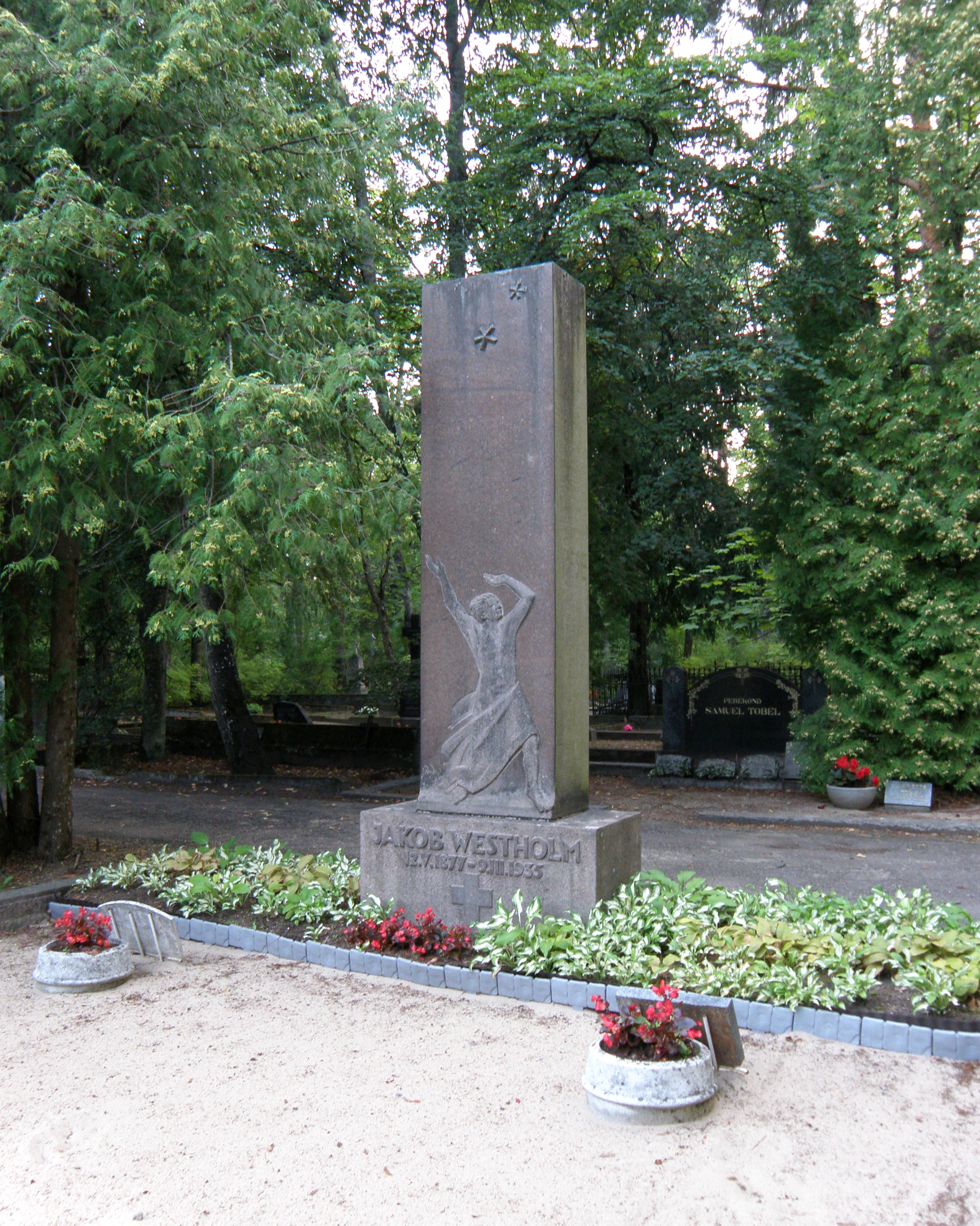
Grave of Jakob Westholm.

== See also ==
- List of cemeteries in Estonia
