= August Alle =

Estonian writer and poet

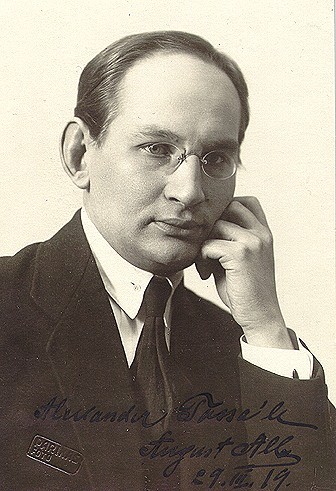
- August Alle in 1919.
- Born: 31 August 1890; Fellin, Governorate of Livonia, Russian Empire
- Died: 8 July 1952 (aged 61); Tallinn, then part of Estonian SSR, Soviet Union
- Occupations: Writer, poet
- Years active: 1915–1952

August Alle (31 August [O.S. 19 August] 1890 – 8 July 1952) was an Estonian writer.

== Early life ==
August Alle was the son of a stonemason. He attended the parish school in Viljandi, then the evening school in Narva. In 1915, he enrolled as an external student in Oryol and began studying pharmacy, but he soon abandoned those studies. From 1915 to 1918, he studied medicine at the University of Saratov. From August 1922 onward, Alle studied law at the University of Tartu. He postponed his final law exams until 1937, and afterwards he practiced as a freelance lawyer.

== Literary career ==
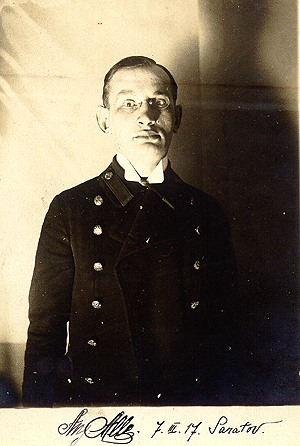
August Alle in 1917

After studying medicine, Alle worked in Estonia as a journalist and lecturer before he completely devoted himself to writing. From 1919 onward, he was associated with the Siuru movement. Alle was also known as a columnist and literary critic. His literary breakthrough came with his 1921 poem collection Carmina Barbata.

His writing was deliberately outrageous, ironic, sarcastic and satirical. He was a master of the epigram and sketches. He turned particularly against the emerging middle class of the inter-war period. In his works he drew on his experiences in the revolutionary Petrograd and Tartu after the Estonian War of Independence. Alle's poetry turned strongly against the fascist tendencies in Europe of that time.

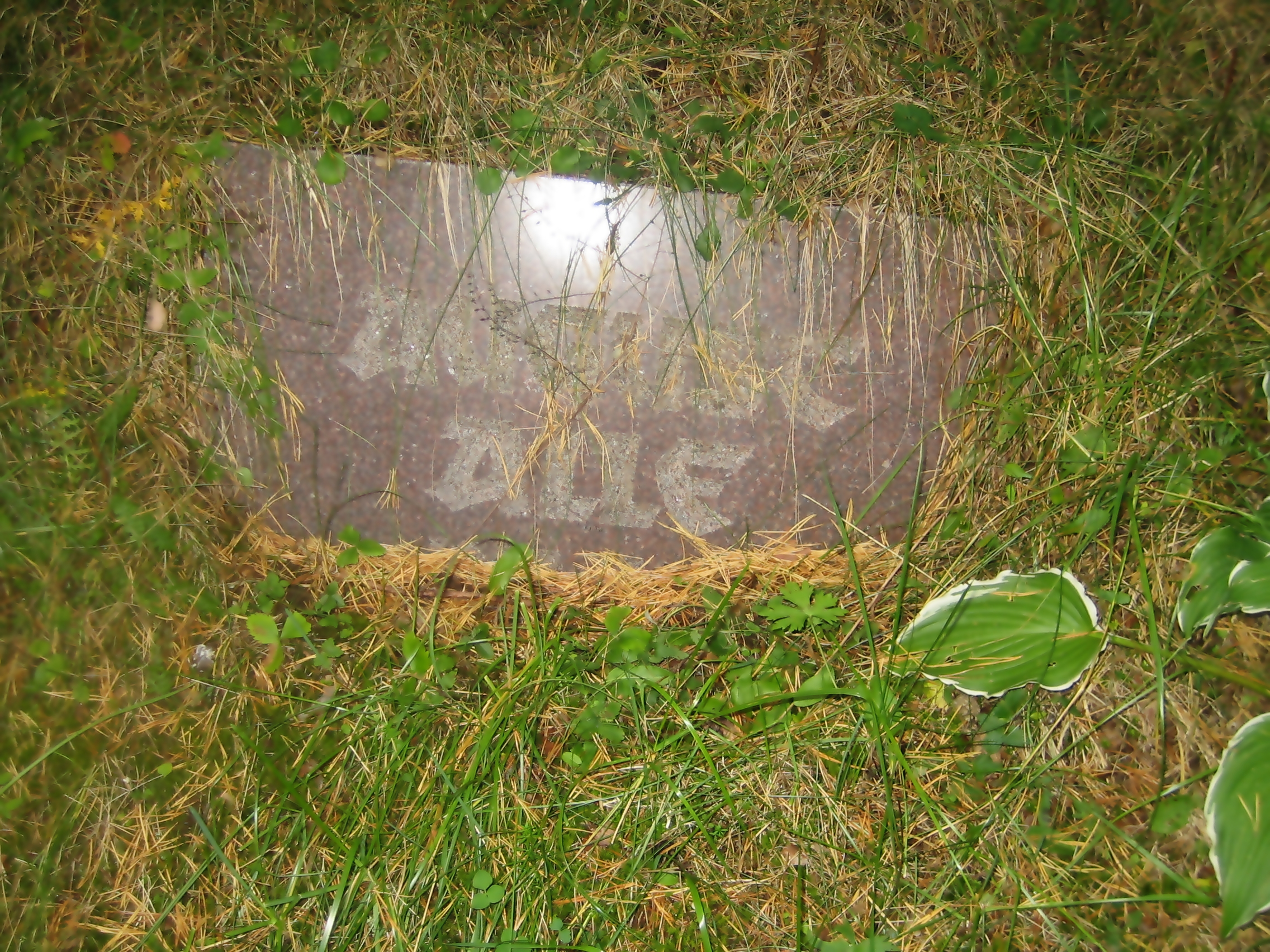
August Alle's grave marker at Metsakalmistu cemetery in Tallinn

== Soviet collaboration ==
After the Soviet occupation of Estonia in 1940, Alle became an advisor to the Ministry of Education and chairman of a Soviet Commission that drew up lists of books to be banned and removed from libraries. Among the books banned were works of Sigmund Freud, Rudolf Steiner, Artur Adson, Gustav Suits, and Marie Under. In all, 1552 titles were banned.

Alle belonged to the Board of the Estonian Writers' Union. In addition, he was editor at various literary journals. In 1942 he joined the Communist Party of Estonia. During the German invasion, he was director of the press department of the Communist Party.

From 1946 until his death he was chief editor of the prestigious (though, after 1944, Soviet controlled) literary magazine Looming (Estonian for "creation").

Alle's best known poem is the Eesti pastoraal (Estonian pastoral).

== Works ==
- Üksinduse saartele (1918)
- Carmina Barbata (1921)
- Laul kleidist helesinisest ja roosast seelikust (1925)
- Ummiklained (1930)
- Karmid rütmid (1934)
- Lilla elevant (1923)
- Epigrams (1944)
