= Teodor Lippmaa =

Estonian botanist

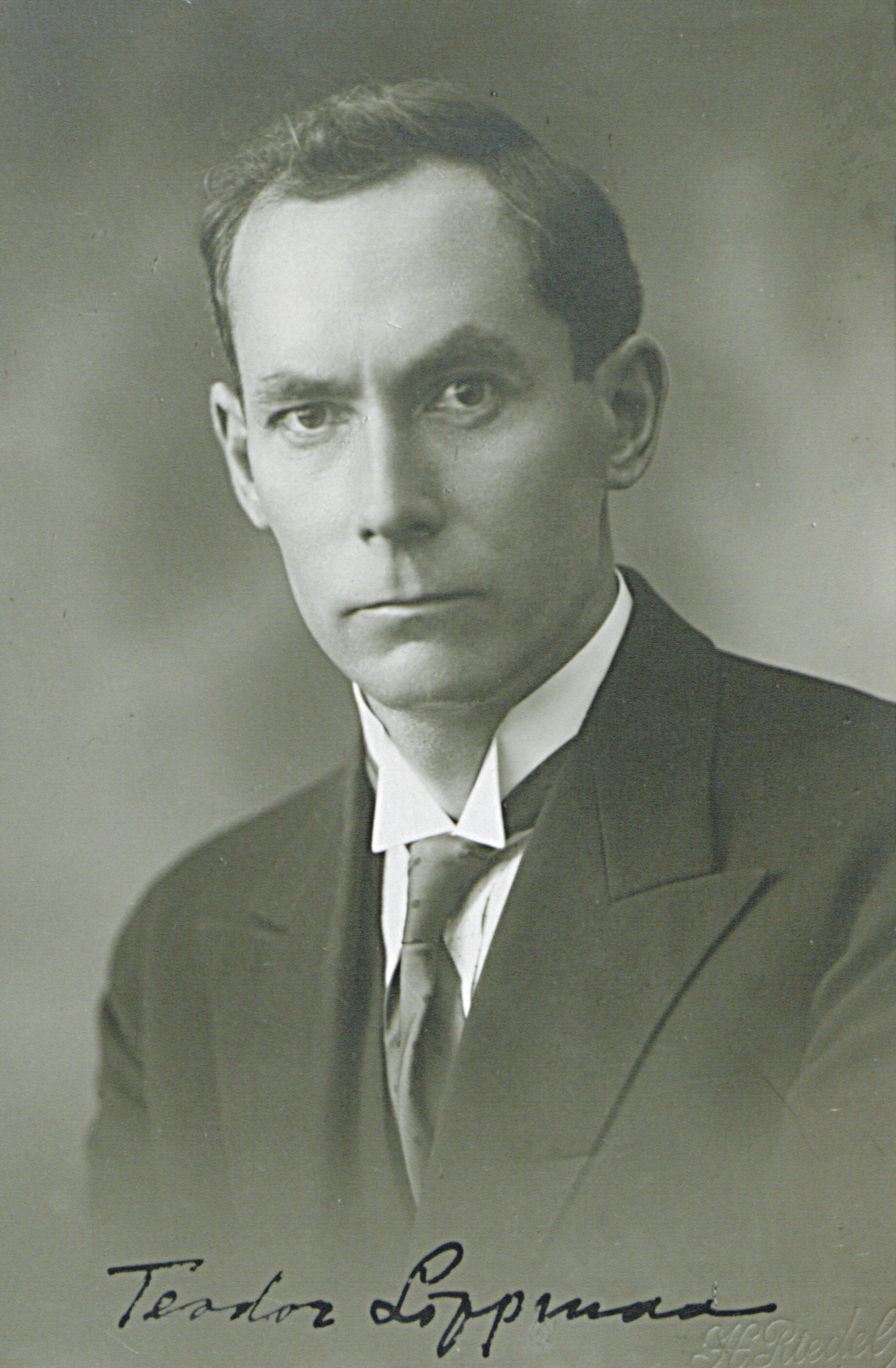
- Born: 17 November 1892; Riga, Russian Empire
- Died: 27 January 1943 (aged 50); Tartu, Estonia
- Education: University of Tartu
- Scientific career
- Fields: Botany, Phytogeography
- Workplaces: University of Tartu

Teodor Lippmaa (17 November 1892 in Riga – 27 January 1943 in Tartu) was a noted Estonian botanist. He was the president of the Estonian Naturalists' Society in 1939–1942.

With Karl Eichwald (1889-1976) he edited the exsiccata work Eesti Taimed - Estonian Plants (1933-1939) distributed by the Botanical Museum of the University of Tartu.

There is a monument honoring him in Tartu where he lived for much of his life. It was erected in 1982.

Lippmaa was killed along with most of his family during a Soviet air raid in 1943. Lippmaa is buried at the Rahumäe cemetery in Tallinn. He was the father of Endel Lippmaa, also a well-known scientist.
