= Juhan Jaik =

Estonian journalist and writer

Juhan Jaik (13 January 1899 – 10 December 1948) was an Estonian writer and journalist.

Jaik was born at Sänna Manor in Rõuge Parish, Kreis Werro. He took part in the Estonian War of Independence. In 1920s and 1930s, he lived in Tallinn, working as a journalist and as a clerk. From 1936 to 1940, he was a consultant for the Ministry of Education. During World War II, he escaped to Sweden. He died in Stora Malm Parish, Katrineholm Municipality in 1948. In 1990, his ashes were returned to Estonia and interred at Rahumäe Cemetery in the Nõmme district of Tallinn.

Jaik was an adherent of Estonian native faith.

== Selected works ==
- 1924: Rõuge kiriku kell (The Bell of Rõuge Church), poetry collection
- 1924–1933: Võrumaa jutud I–II (Tales from Võrumaa I–II), story
- 1999 (posthumously): Tiroliaana (Tiroliana)
