= Ratla =

Village in Estonia

Coordinates: 58°29′N 22°50′E

- Village
- Interactive map of Ratla
- Country: Estonia
- County: Saare County
- Parish: Saaremaa Parish
- Time zone: UTC+2 (EET)
  - Summer (DST): UTC+3 (EEST)

Ratla is a village in Saaremaa Parish, Saare County, on the island of Saaremaa Estonia.

Before the administrative reform in 2017, the village was in Leisi Parish.

== Notable people ==
Notable people that were born or lived in Ratla:

- Jaan Oks (1884–1918), writer, critic and poet.
