= Läste =

Village in Estonia

Coordinates: 59°15′N 25°49′E

- Village
- Interactive map of Läste
- Country: Estonia
- County: Lääne-Viru County
- Parish: Tapa Parish
- Time zone: UTC+2 (EET)
  - Summer (DST): UTC+3 (EEST)

Läste is a village in Tapa Parish, Lääne-Viru County, in northeastern Estonia.

Estonian chemist Jaan Kalviste (1898–1936) was born on Mikko farm in Läste.
