= Jaan Kalviste =

Estonian chemist

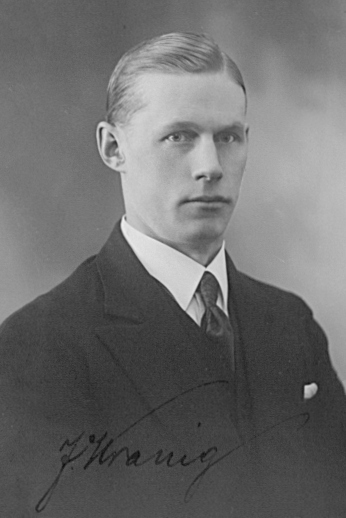
- Born: Jaan Kranig; 3 April 1898; Läste, Governorate of Estonia, Russian Empire
- Died: 15 June 1936 (aged 38); Männiku, Estonia
- Resting place: Rahumäe cemetery
- Education: University of Tartu; University of Paris
- Scientific career
- Fields: Chemistry; Mineralogy
- Workplaces: University of Tartu; Virumaa Mining School; Kohtla-Järve Oil Manufactory; State Oil Shale Industry Laboratory
- Thesis: Contribution to the Development of Complexes of Oxalics and Carbonics in Trivalent Cobalt (1929)

Jaan Kalviste (3 April 1898 – 15 June 1936) was an Estonian chemist, mineralogist, educator, and translator.

== Early life ==
Jaan Kalviste was born Jaan Kranig on Mikko farm in the small village of Läste in present-day Lääne-Viru County to railway worker Ado Kranig and his wife Kadri (née Kuulmata). He was the second eldest of five siblings. He attended primary school in rural Lehtse Parish before studying at secondary school in Tallinn.

During World War I he was conscripted and served a year in the Imperial Russian Army, then enlisted in the Estonian Land Forces at age twenty and fought in the Estonian War of Independence.

== Education ==
Following the end of the war, he enrolled at the University of Tartu in 1920; graduating with a master's degree in chemistry in 1925 with the thesis Investigation of Alkyl Carbonate Constants. Kalviste was a founding member of Students' Society Raimla (Üliõpilaste Selts Raimla, or ÜS Raimla).

In 1926 he relocated to France as a scholarship holder and received his Doctor of Science degree from the University of Paris in 1929 following the publication of his thesis Contribution to the Development of Complexes of Oxalics and Carbonics in Trivalent Cobalt by Masson publishing house.

== Work ==
Kalviste returned to Estonia in 1929 and taught chemistry and mineralogy at the University of Tartu as a docent until 1933. From 1933, he worked as a senior chemist at the Kohtla-Järve Oil Manufactory where he experimented with the study of oil shale products (phenols, gasoline, etc.) using spectrometric methods and in photochemistry. In 1935, he changed his surname from Kranig to Kalviste. In 1936, he worked as a chemist of the State Oil Shale Industry Laboratory and concurrently as a teacher at the Virumaa Mining School in Jõhvi.

Fluent in several languages, Jaan Kalviste translated mathematician Henri Poincaré's 1902 book Science and Hypothesis from French into Estonian (Teadus ja hüpotees) in 1936.

== Death ==
On 15 June 1936, Jaan Kalviste was part of a group of approximately ten chemists at a seminar organized at the laboratory of the Männiku military ammunition stores in the Tallinn district of Nõmme when a massive explosion occurred, destroying the entire site and starting a blaze in the nearby heath and pine forest. Kalviste was among the 63 individuals who died in the explosion; the cause of which has never been fully determined. He was 38 years old.

Kalviste was buried at the Rahumäe cemetery in Tallinn.

== Personal life ==
Jaan Kalviste was married to Alma Ennok on 21 February 1931 and had two sons, Aavo and Jüri, who were both under the age of five when he died. Following Kalviste's death, his widow Alma emigrated to the United States in 1949 and later remarried.
