= Jaan Oks =

Estonian writer and poet

Jaan Oks (February 28, 1884 in Ratla, Pärsamaa Parish, Saare County – February 25, 1918) was an Estonian writer, critic and poet.

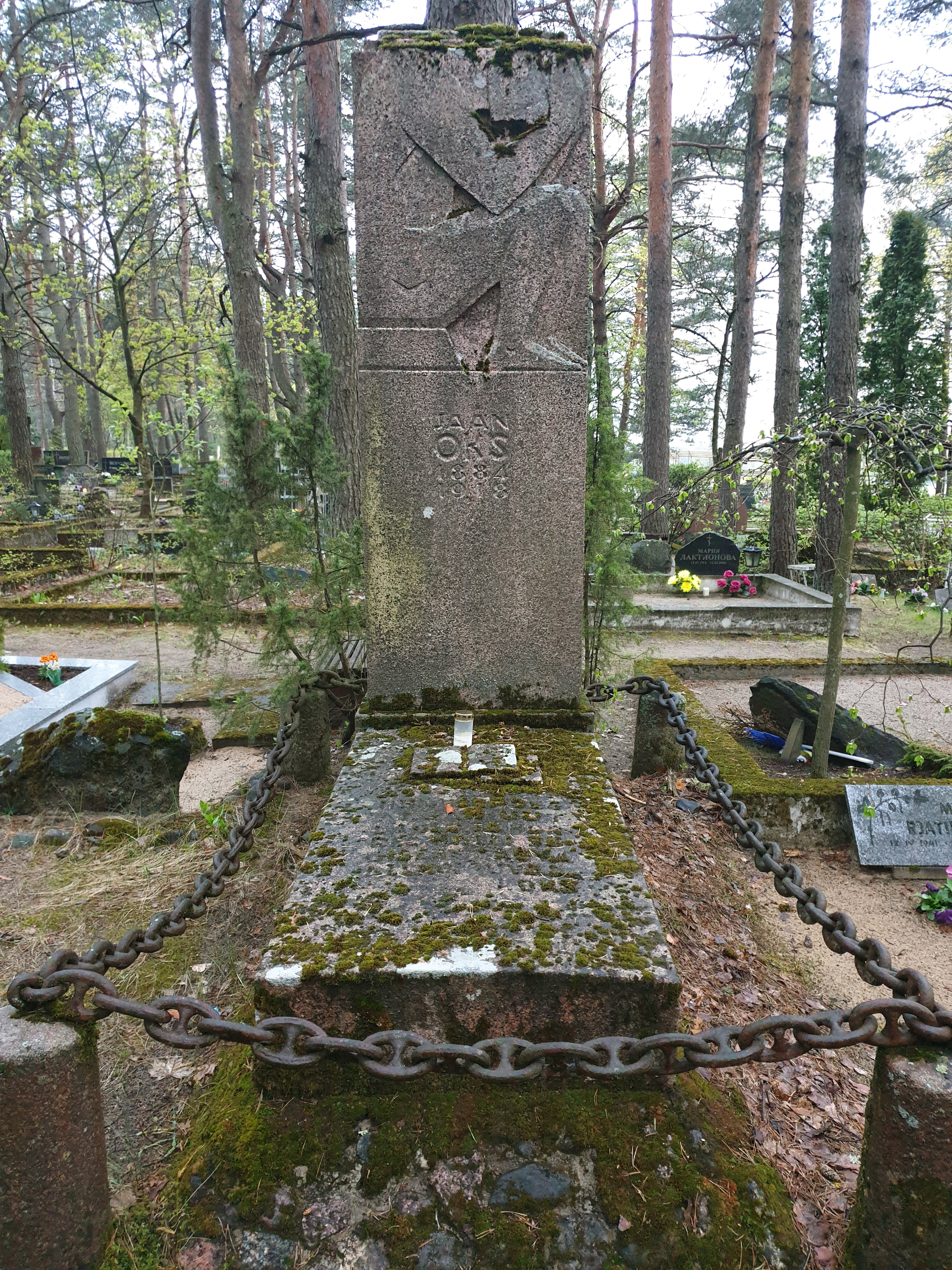
The writer's grave in Rahumäe Cemetery, Tallinn

Jaan Oks was raised in a Lutheran family on the island of Saaremaa. He made his literary debut in 1906 with a story "The Time of the Manifest" (Manifesti Aegu), inspired by the Russian Revolution of 1905 and its effects on the local peasant community. He wrote criticism and fiction for the group Young Estonia and corresponded with the writer Friedebert Tuglas

A generation after the Estonian national awakening, the Young Estonians were interested in developing a new literary language inspired by trends such as symbolism and the fin de siècle. In his writing, Oks cultivated the transgressive aesthetic of the literary decadent movement, focusing on decline and decay in a rural milieu. Among other influences, Oks was deeply inspired by the style and thinking of Friedrich Nietzsche.

While other politically active Young Estonian authors, such as Tuglas and Eduard Vilde, chose to flee to Scandinavia and Western Europe, Oks moved to the Samara Governorate in 1907 to work as a teacher. There, he was extremely productive and wrote a series of prose-poems from 1908-1909, "Females" (Emased), "Flesh" (Ihu), and "The Nameless Beast" (Nimetu Elajas). Poet and scholar Kristian Haljak has compared these texts to Comte de Lautréamont's Les Chants de Maldoror in effecting a revolutionary shift in poetic language.

Jaan Oks experienced a mental decline and was dismissed from his position in 1912. He was arrested by the Tsarist government and returned to Tallinn, and though conscripted in the Estonian War of Independence died in 1918, on the eve of Independence Day (Estonia) due to bone tuberculosis. Tuglas edited and published his first book, "The Dark Child of Humankind" (Tume inimeselaps) in 1918.

== Works ==
- 1918: prose "Tume inimeselaps" ('A Dark Child of Humankind')
- 2003: collection (30-40 poems) "Otsija metsas" ('The Seeker in the Forest')
- 2004: collection "Orjapojad" ('Sons of Slaves')

== English Translations ==
"The Mouth," and "The Mountain of Souls"
