= Ahja =

Borough in Estonia

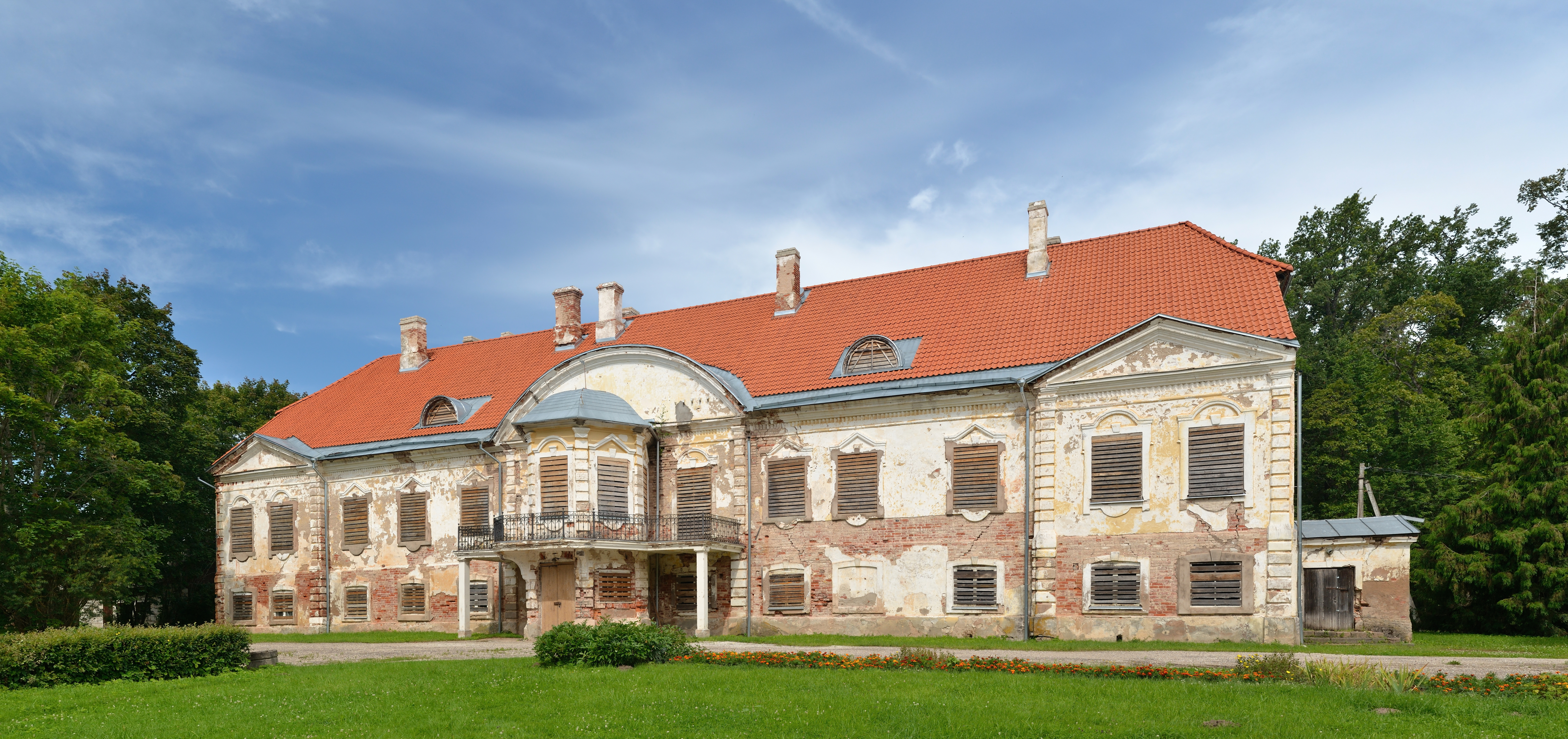
- Ahja Manor

- Location within Estonia
- Coordinates: 58°12′14″N 27°4′24″E
- Country: Estonia
- County: Põlva County
- Municipality: Põlva Parish
- Time zone: UTC+2 (EET)

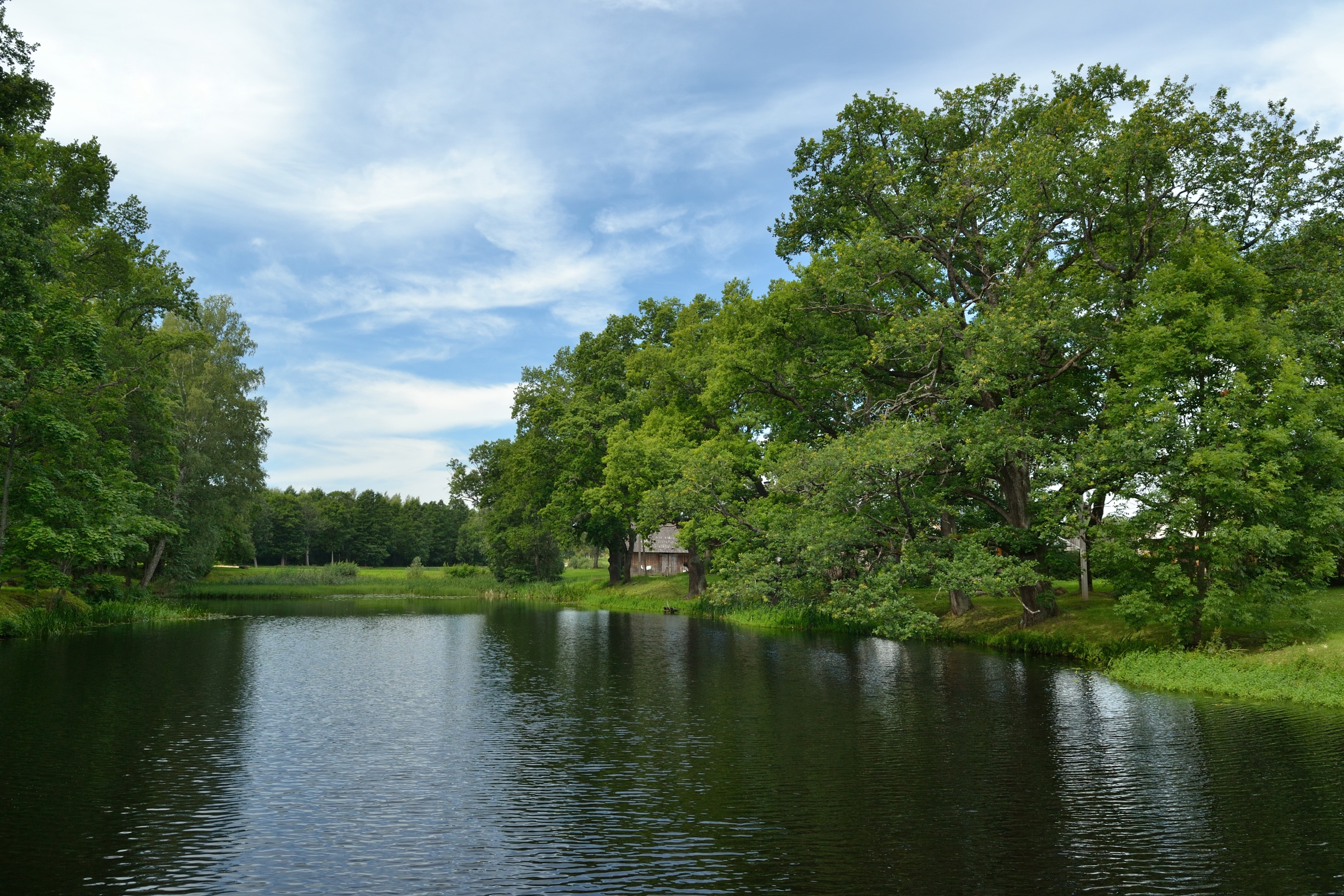
Small lake on Ahja territory

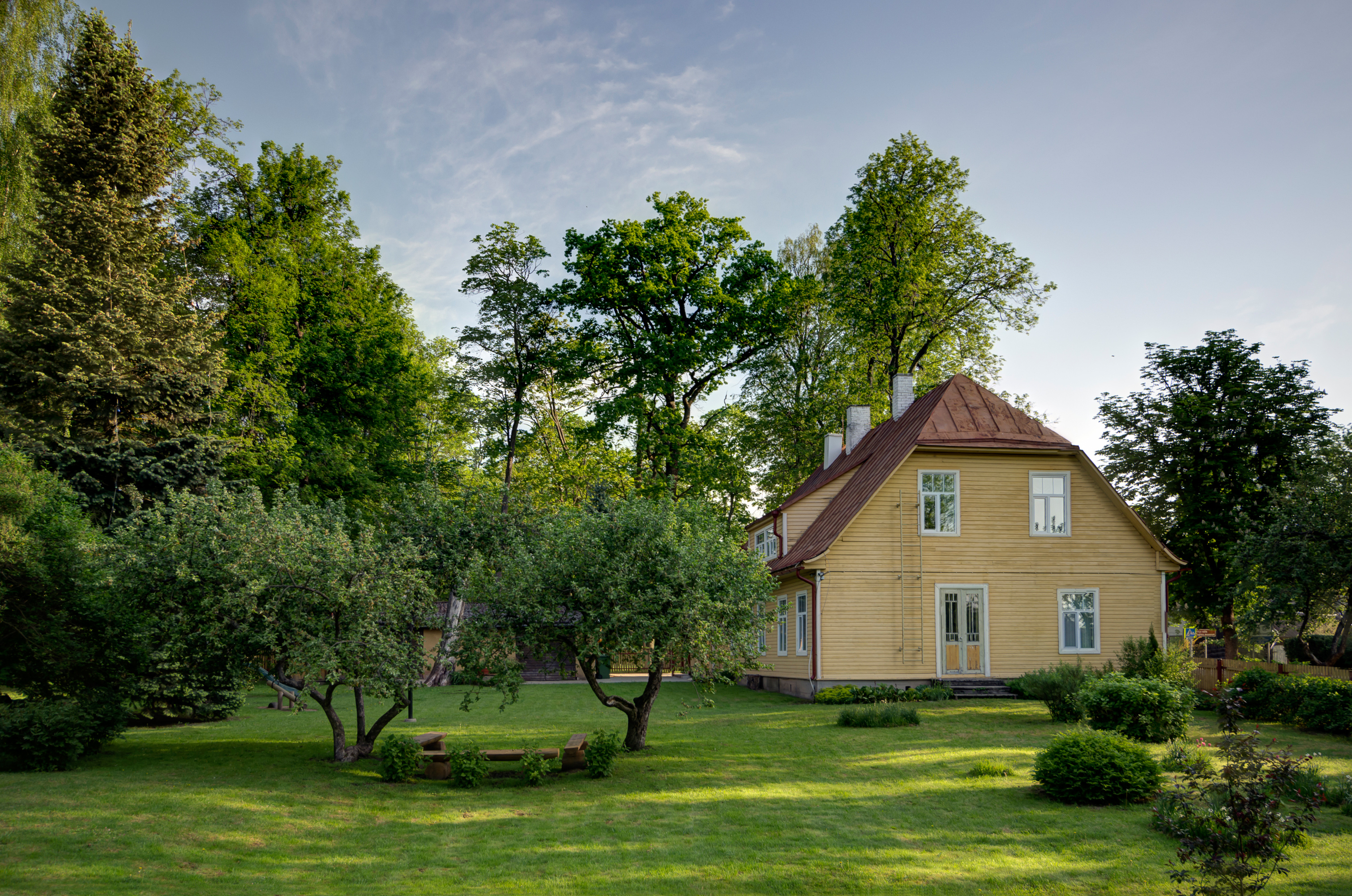
Friedebert Tuglas Museum and library

Ahja is a small borough (alevik) in Põlva Parish, Põlva County in southeastern Estonia. Named after the Ahja River, it is located 191 kilometers (119 mi) southeast of Tallinn and about 16 kilometers (9.9 mi) north of Põlva.

== Ahja manor ==
The earliest references to Ahja estate (German: Aya) are from 1553. It belonged to the Oxenstierna family in the 17th century but was later taken over by the Swedish state through one of the so-called reductions.

In 1716, it was given to Christina Glück, the widow of Johann Ernst Glück, in whose family the future Catherine I of Russia grew up. The present two-storey, Baroque style building with a pavilion-shaped main entrance dates from the period of ownership of François Guillemot de Villebois, who was the son-in-law of Christina Glück. The building was completed around 1749, probably built by master builders from St. Petersburg.

In 1770, Jakob Michael Reinhold Lenz became for two years the manager of the estate. Later, it belonged to various Baltic German families. One of these was the von Brasch, who built a burial chapel, still standing, for their family members in the manor park.

== Notable people ==
- Signy Aarna (born 1990), football player
- Andrus Murumets (born 1978), strongman
- Friedebert Tuglas (1886–1971), writer

== See also ==
- List of palaces and manor houses in Estonia
