= Sänna =

Village in Estonia

- Village
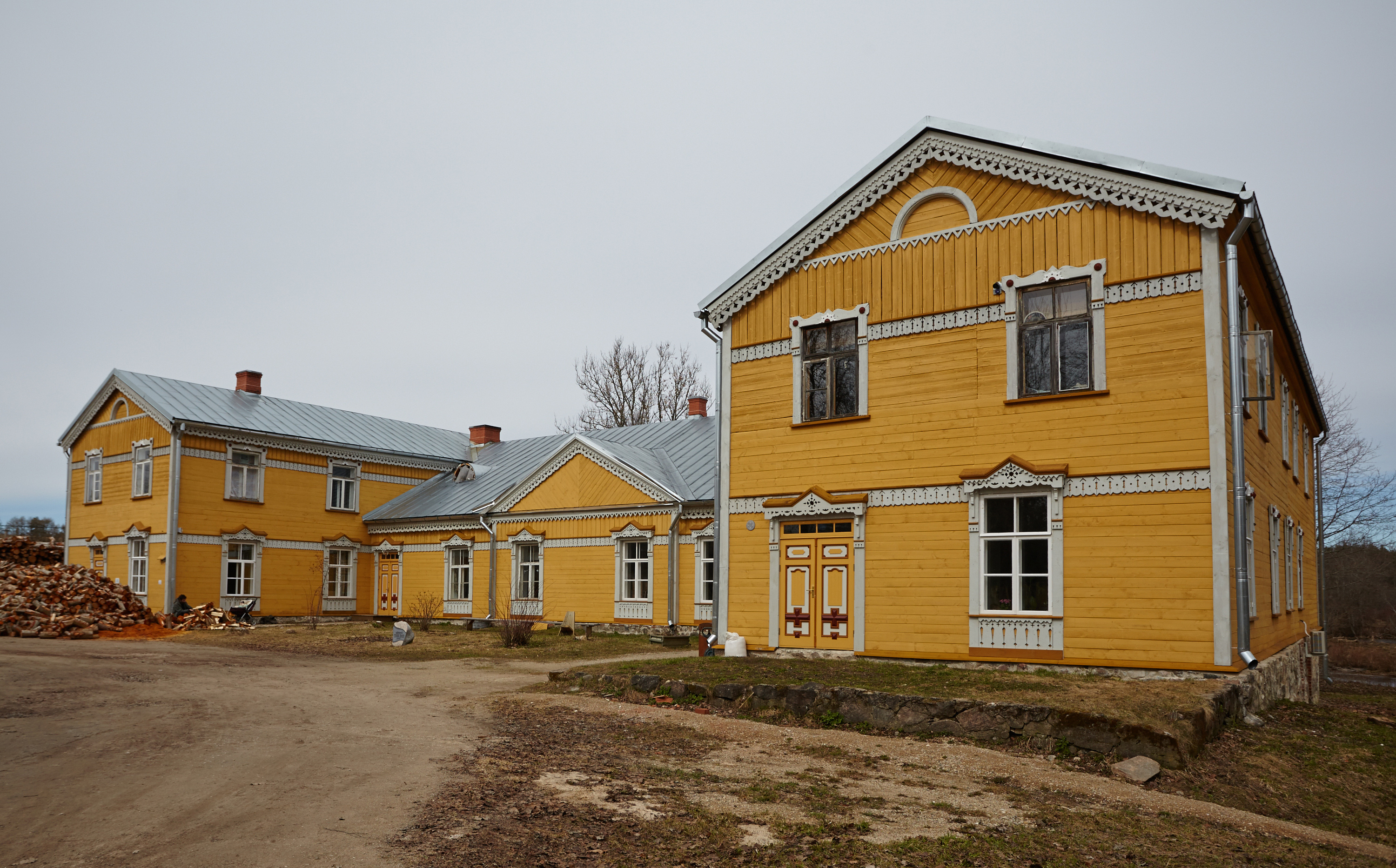
- Sänna manor house

- Location in Estonia
- Coordinates: 57°44′27″N 26°47′06″E
- Country: Estonia
- County: Võru County
- Municipality: Rõuge Parish

Population (2011 Census)
  - Total: 55

Sänna (Võro: Sännä, German: Sennen) is a village in Rõuge Parish, Võru County in southeastern Estonia. As of the 2011 census, the settlement's population was 55.

Poet and writer Artur Adson (1889–1977) grew up in Sänna village. Writer Juhan Jaik was born in Sänna.

== Sänna manor ==
A manor has existed on the site since the Middle Ages, when it was a subsidiary manor to Vastseliina Castle. The present, wooden building however dates from 1875. Throughout history, the manor has belonged to several different Baltic German families, including the aristocratic families von Budberg, von Vietinghoff and von Fusch. It currently houses a library and a community centre and is open to the public.

== Gallery ==
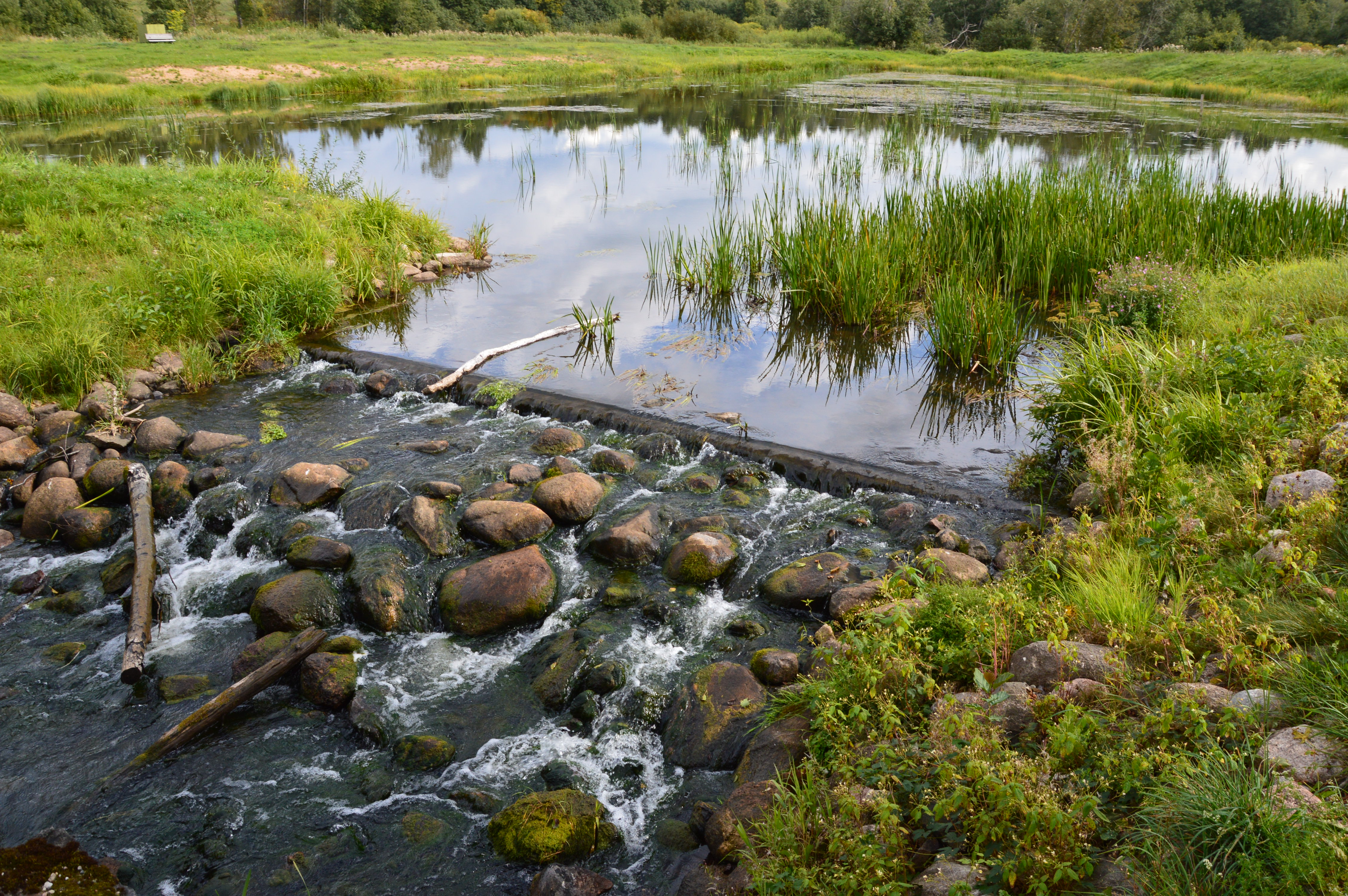
Pärlijõgi

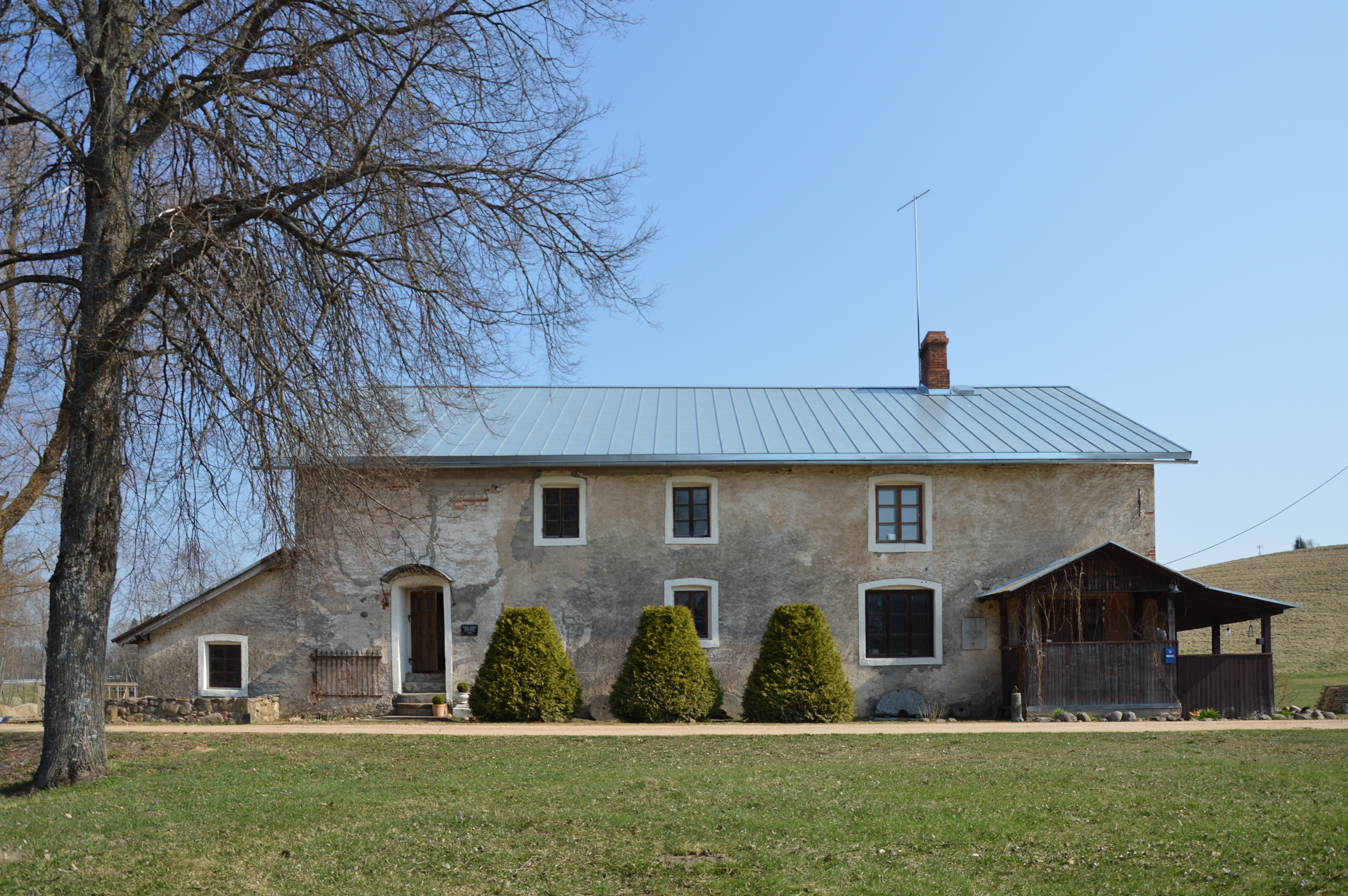
Sänna Hill Mill

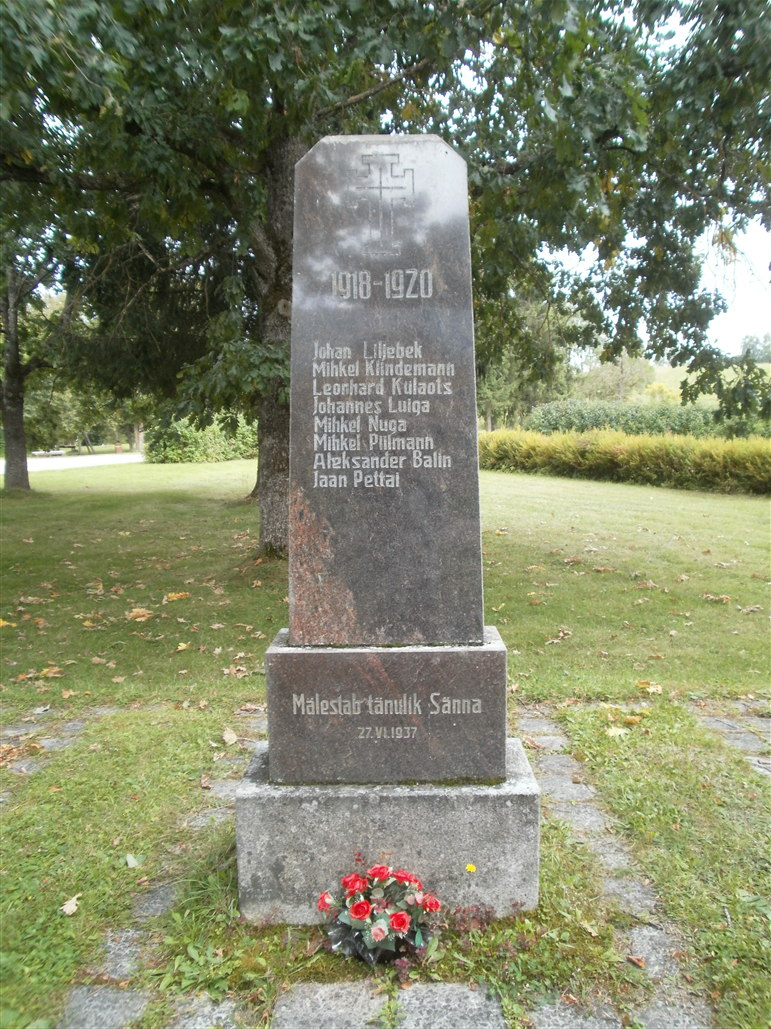
Estonian War of Independence monument

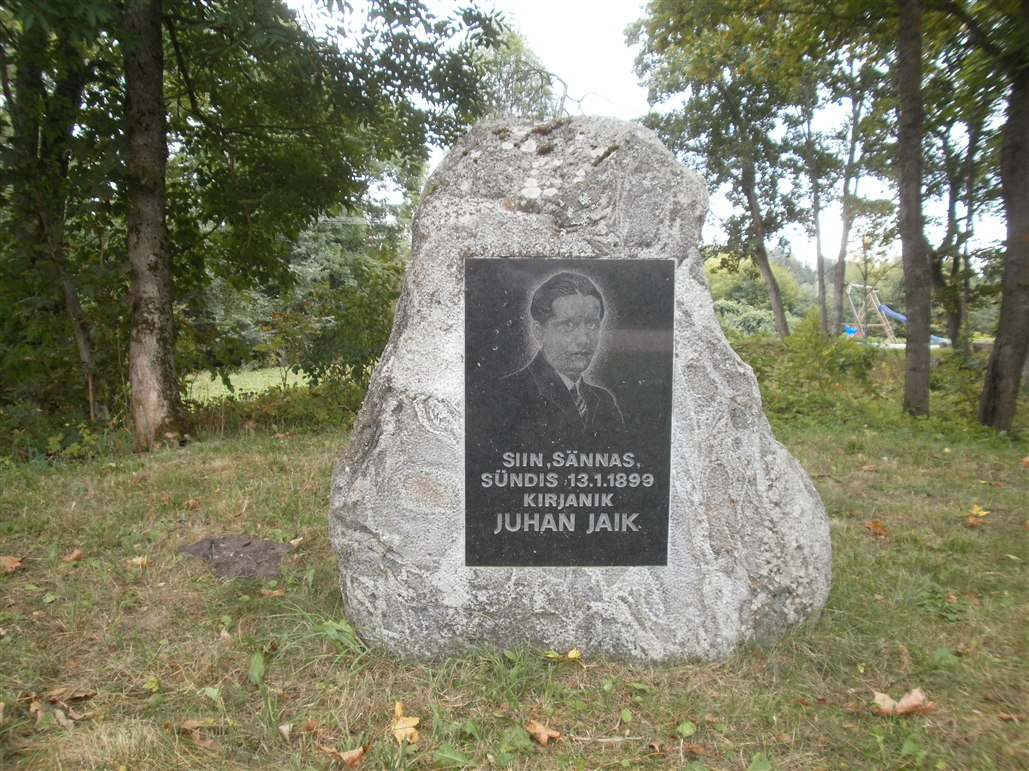
Memorial plaque to Estonian writer and journalist Juhan Jaik, who was born at Sänna Manor
