= Siuru =

Estonian literary movement

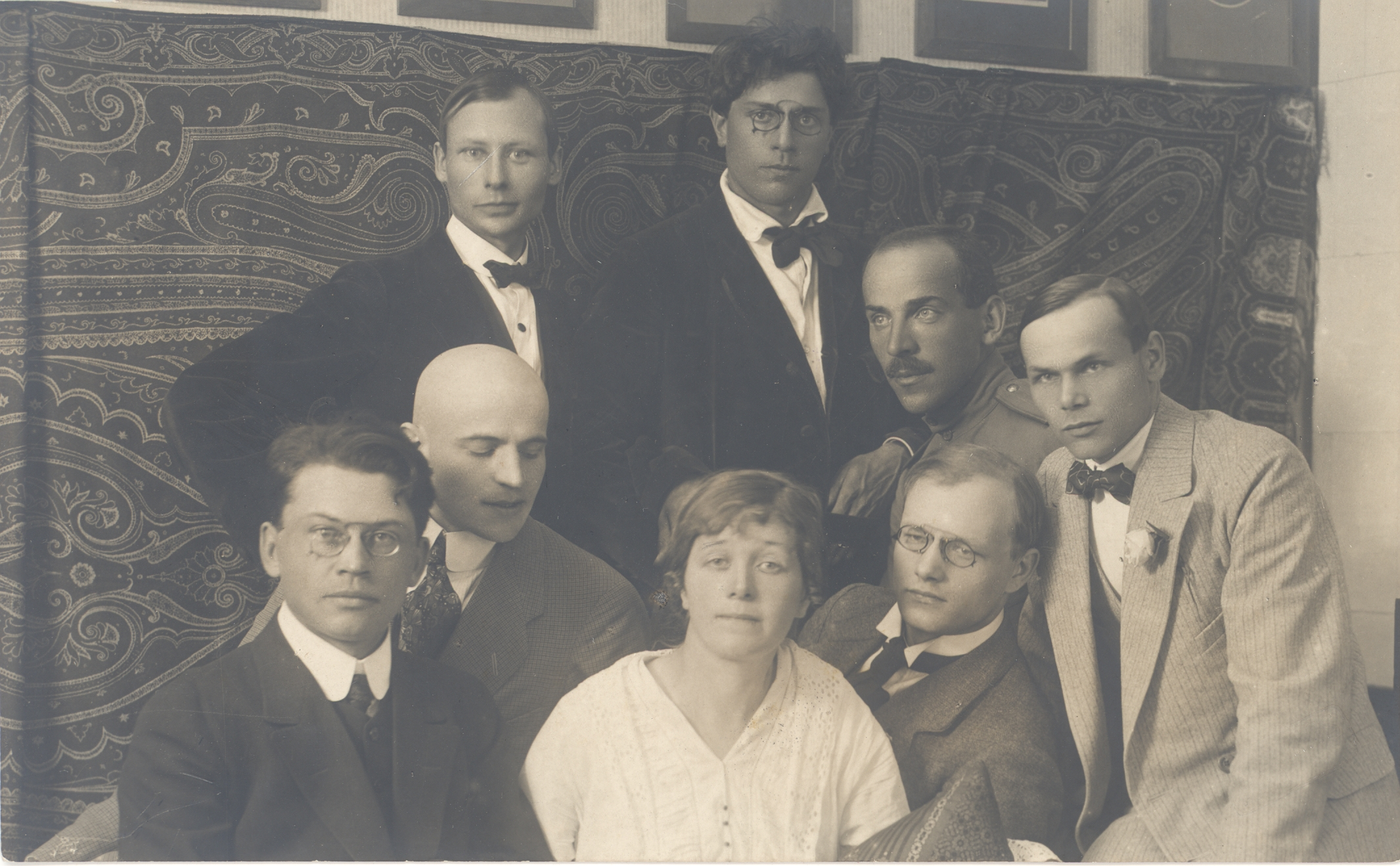
Members of Siuru group, rear: Peet Aren, Otto Krusten; front row: Friedebert Tuglas, Arthur Adson, Marie Under, August Gailit, Johannes Semper and Henrik Visnapuu

The Siuru literary movement, named after a fire-bird in Finnic mythology, was founded in 1917 in Estonia. It was an expressionistic and neo-romantic movement that ran counter to the Young Estonia formalist tradition.

== Members ==
Along with the founder August Gailit, the movement included the following young poets and writers: Marie Under, Henrik Visnapuu, Johannes Semper, Friedebert Tuglas, Peet Aren, Otto Krusten, and Artur Adson. Between 1917 and 1919, Siuru published three volumes of poetry. 1919 led to conflicts within the group. Visnapuu and Gailit left, while Johannes Barbarus and August Alle joined as new members.

== Program ==
The members of Siuru had an affinity with futurism and Impressionism. Their poetry was often seen as scandalous due to their erotic nature. Siuru's philosophy stressed the freedom of the human spirit. Mottos of the group included Carpe diem!, and May the joy of creation be our only moving force, the latter suggested by Friedebert Tuglas. The group's symbol was white chrysanthemum.

== Significance ==
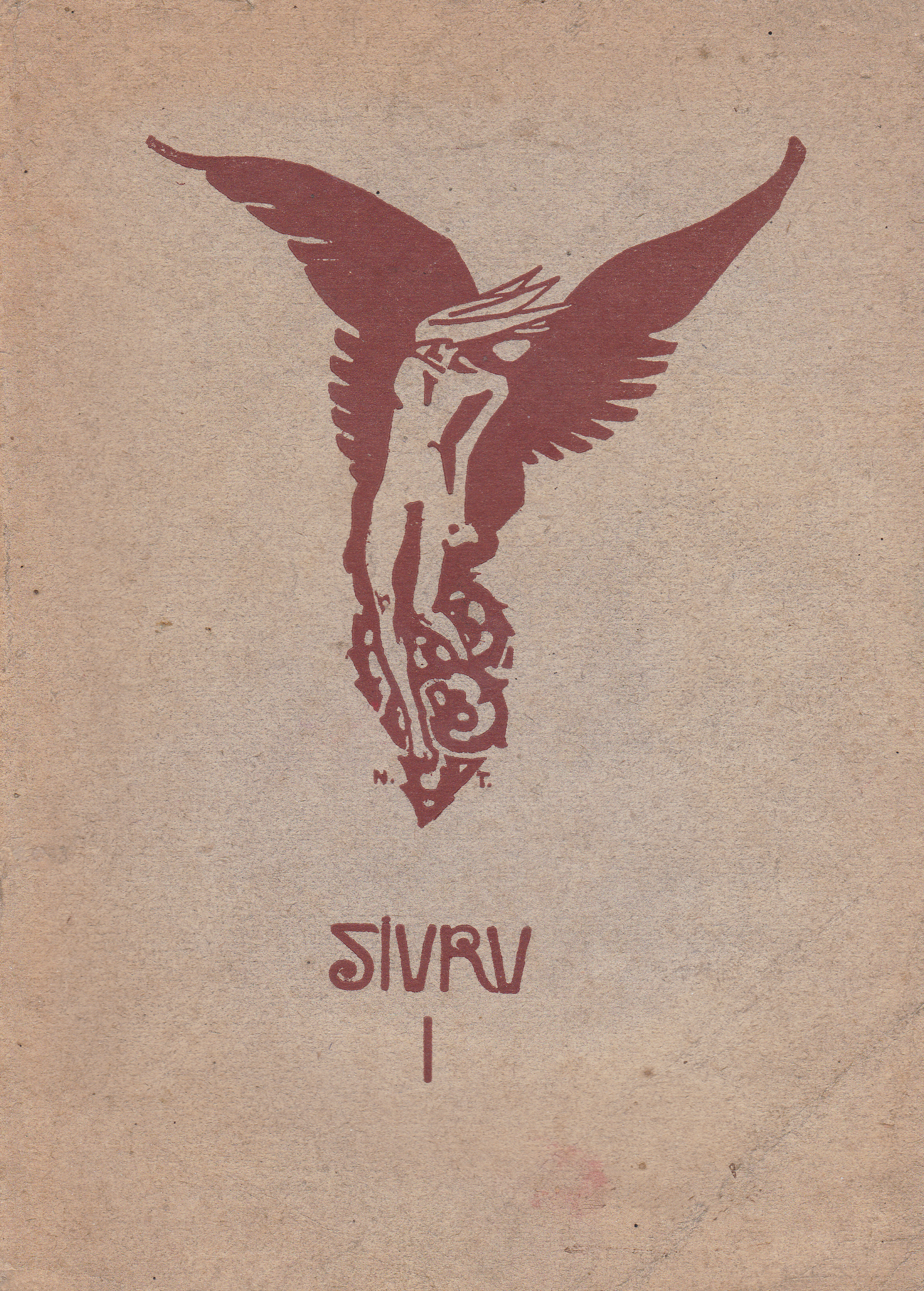
Cover of their first issue

A major result of Siuru's activities was popularisation of literature among Estonian people, leading to the active development of original Estonian literature in the young Republic of Estonia. While the movement itself was short-lived, cut short by Estonian independence and the ensuing movement of national literature, its members rose to be major figures in Estonian literature through Estonia's first period of independence and in the exile Estonian literary community during Soviet occupation.

Marie Under (1883–1980) was the leader of the movement, publishing her first book, Sonnets, in 1917. While her expressions of nature found a wide audience, her frank eroticism shocked conservatives, a motif she carried on in her subsequent works. Under went on to a long and distinguished literary career, publishing her last book in 1963.

Artur Adson (1889–1977) published his first collection of poems, The Burning Soul, in 1917. Both this and his next collection, Old Lantern (1919), consisted of juvenile love poems. Adson went on to widely expand his genre, including dealing with social issues in a classical form. Adson wrote numerous plays. His Four Kings, a drama on the Estonian uprising of 1343, is considered his most thrilling work. He continued to write in exile, also publishing several books of memoirs, the last in 1953. Adson was Marie Under's second husband.
