= Endel Lippmaa =

Estonian scientist and politician (1930–2015)

- Endel Lippmaa (2006)
- Born: 15 September 1930; Tartu
- Died: 30 July 2015 (aged 84)

Endel Lippmaa (15 September 1930 – 30 July 2015) was an Estonian scientist, academician, politician, and twice government minister in 1990–1991 and 1995–1996.

Lippmaa was founder and chairman of the Science Council of the National Institute of Chemical Physics and Biophysics. He was also head chairman and professor of chemical physics, physical chemistry, physics, and mathematics at the Estonian Academy of Sciences and was highly regarded in his work into solid-state nuclear magnetic resonance (NMR). In 1999, he was voted one of the 100 great Estonians of the 20th century.

== Scientific and political career ==
In 1972, Endel Lippmaa was elected as a Member of the Estonian Academy of Sciences. He served as a member of the Board of the Academy for the period 1975–2014. In 1977-1982 he was Secretary-Academician of the Division of Physics, Mathematics and Engineering, in 1999-2004 Head of the Division of Astronomy and Physics, in 2007-2010 Chairman of the Energy Council of the Academy.

During Lippmaa's time working in physics, he wrote a paper on "Structural studies of silicates by solid-state high-resolution silicon-29 NMR,". This paper, now highly regarded, demonstrated in 1980 that high-resolution NMR spectroscopy could be applied profitably to inorganic samples, not just organic or biological ones. According to Google Scholar, the paper has garnered 1496 citations as at May 2025.

During the Singing revolution he was an active member of the Popular Front of Estonia. He was in 1989 elected member the new Soviet parliament, the Congress of People's Deputies. In 1989, in the newly elected Soviet Congress he become best known for his work in uncovering and denouncing of the crucial documents of the 1939 Nazi-Soviet Pact which in June 1940 had resulted in the Stalinist Soviet Union's military invasion, occupation and illegal annexation of three Baltic countries: Estonia, Latvia and Lithuania.

At the time when Estonia restored full independence from the USSR, in 1990–1991, he was Minister for the Eastern Affairs of the Republic of Estonia (in the government cabinets led by prime ministers Edgar Savisaar and Tiit Vähi, respectively). In 1990–1992 he was elected member of the Congress of Estonia. Later he was a founding member of the Coalition Party. In 1995–1996 he served as Minister of European Affairs, and in 1996-1999 he was elected Member of Parliament (Riigikogu).

== Personal life ==
Endel Lippmaa was born in Tartu. His father was the botanist Teodor Lippmaa, and his maternal grandfather was the writer and journalist Jakob Mändmets. He graduated from Nõmme High School in 1948 and from Tallinn University of Technology (TUT) in 1953, where he majored in oil shale technology.

Lippmaa was married to Helle Lippmaa and had two sons, Jaak Lippmaa and Mikk Lippmaa.

== Awards ==
In 2000, Lippmaa was awarded the Order of the National Coat of Arms, II Class.
