= Jakob Mändmets =

Estonian writer and journalist

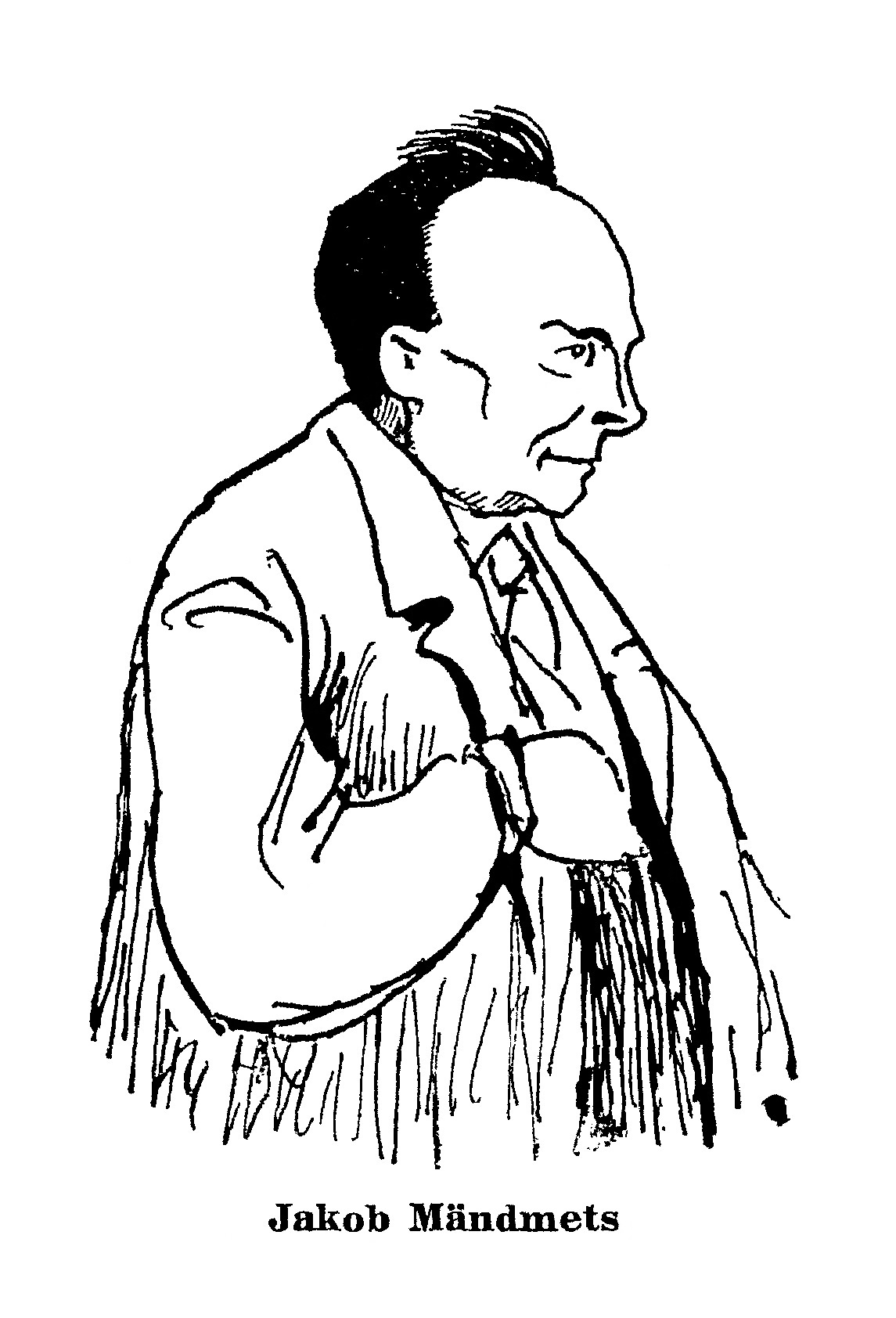
- Portrait of Mändmets by Karl August Hindrey, 1922
- Born: July 29, 1871; Paiküla, Saaremaa
- Died: December 25, 1930 (aged 59); Tallinn
- Burial place: Rahumäe cemetery, Tallinn
- Occupations: Writer, journalist, teacher
- Relatives: Endel Lippmaa

Jakob Mändmets (July 29, 1871 – December 25, 1930) was an Estonian writer and journalist.

Jakob Mändmets was born in Paiküla, Kärla Parish (now Saaremaa Parish), Kreis Ösel on the island of Saaremaa. He studied from 1885 to 1888 at the Teachers' Training College of Kaarma. He then worked in the counties of Saaremaa, Läänemaa and Harjumaa as a teacher. He then embarked on a career in journalism. From 1903 until its ban in 1905, he worked as an editor at the Estonian newspaper Uus Aeg, and then between 1906 and 1910 at Päevaleht. From 1910 to 1916, he was employed at Tallinna Teataja, and from 1916 until his death, he worked again at Päevaleht.

He began writing books in 1897, writing mainly stories, novellas and short stories that describe life in Estonia. A large part of his work he dedicated to the humble daily life on his native island of Saaremaa, and became known for writing village stories like Night-Herdsmen (1901), The Pastor Romer (1917), and Through the Underwood (1927). He also published plays, essays and reviews. In 1922 he became a member of the Estonian Writers' Union.

Mändmets was the grandfather of physicist and academician Endel Lippmaa. Following his death he was interred at Rahumäe Cemetery in Tallinn, Estonia.
