= Paiküla =

Village in Estonia

Coordinates: 58°21′N 22°15′E

- Village
- Interactive map of Paiküla
- Country: Estonia
- County: Saare County
- Parish: Saaremaa Parish
- Time zone: UTC+2 (EET)
  - Summer (DST): UTC+3 (EEST)

Paiküla is a village in Saaremaa Parish, Saare County in western Estonia.

Paiküla is the birthplace of Estonian writer and journalist Jakob Mändmets (1871–1930).

Before the administrative reform in 2017, the village was in Lääne-Saare Parish.
