= Artur Adson =

Estonian writer and theatre critic (1889–1977)

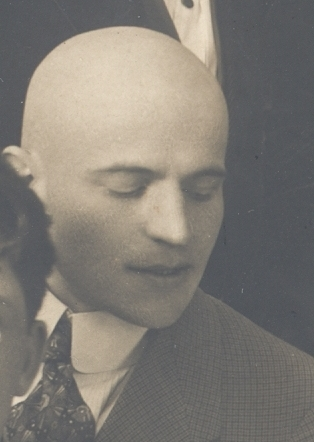
- Born: 3 February [O.S. 22 January] 1889; Sänna, Russian Empire (present-day Estonia)
- Died: 5 January 1977 (aged 87); Stockholm, Sweden
- Spouse: Marie Under
- Writing career
- Movements: Siuru, Tarapita

Artur Adson (3 February [O.S. 22 January] 1889 – 5 January 1977) was an Estonian poet, writer and theatre critic.

== Early years ==
Artur Adson (born Karl Arthur Adson) was born in Tartu and attended school in Tartu, Sänna and Võru. After graduating he first studied surveying in Pskov. In 1925–26, he studied literature at the University of Tartu. Artur Adson was a surveyor, journalist and theater critic in Estonia and Russia. He met his future wife Marie Under in 1913, and they married in 1927.

== Literary career ==
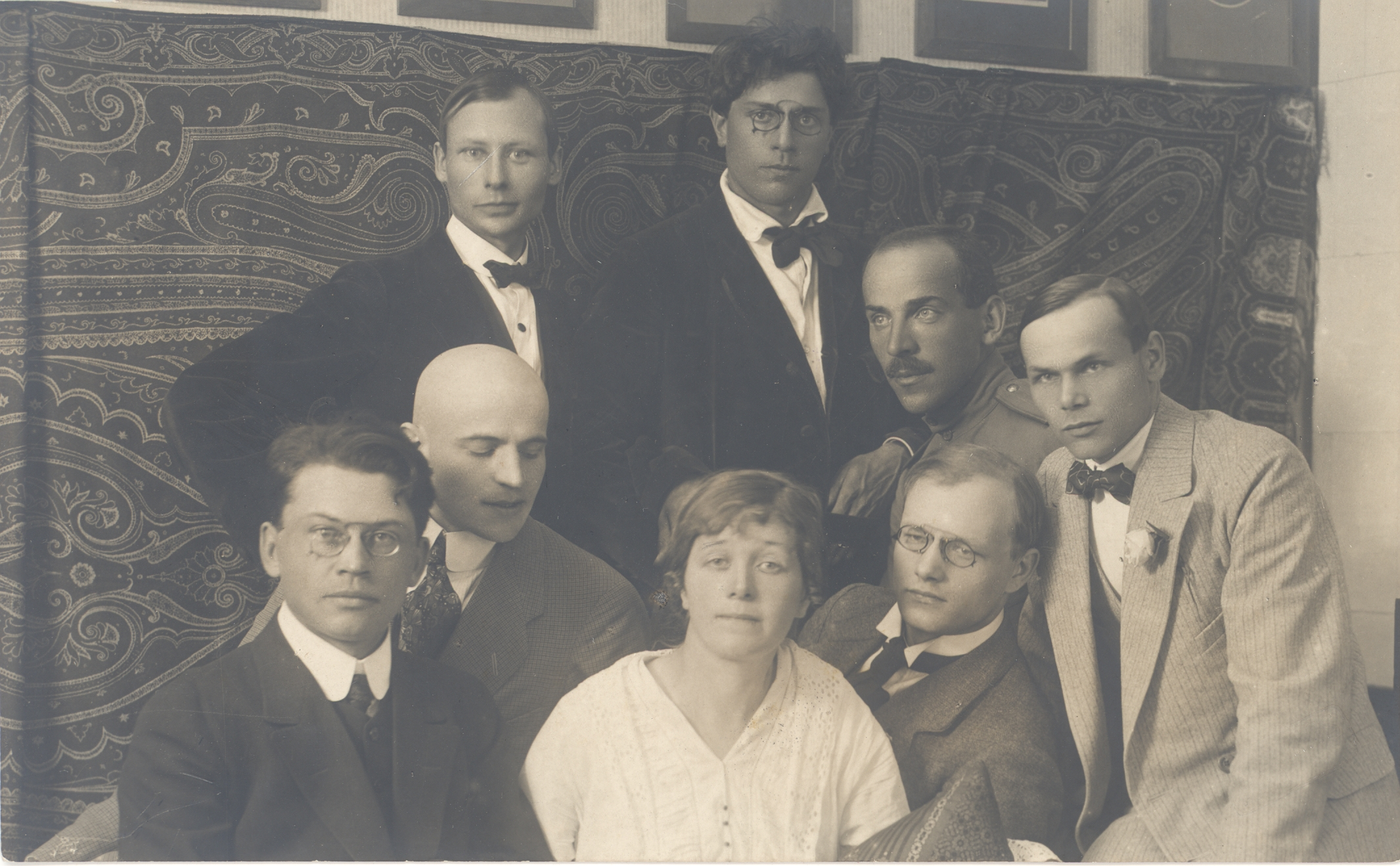
Adson (seated second from left) with fellow members of the Siuru movement in 1917

From 1917 Artur Adson was a member of the Siuru literary movement, which exerted great influence on the Estonian literature. Later Adson was also active in the Tarapita movement. In addition, Adson was one of the most outstanding poets in the Võro language of southern Estonia. As an often conservative theatrical and literary critic, he exercised influence on the cultural scene of the Republic of Estonia.

Adson was also a translator. Among others, he translated Dr. Zhivago into Estonian.

== Exile ==
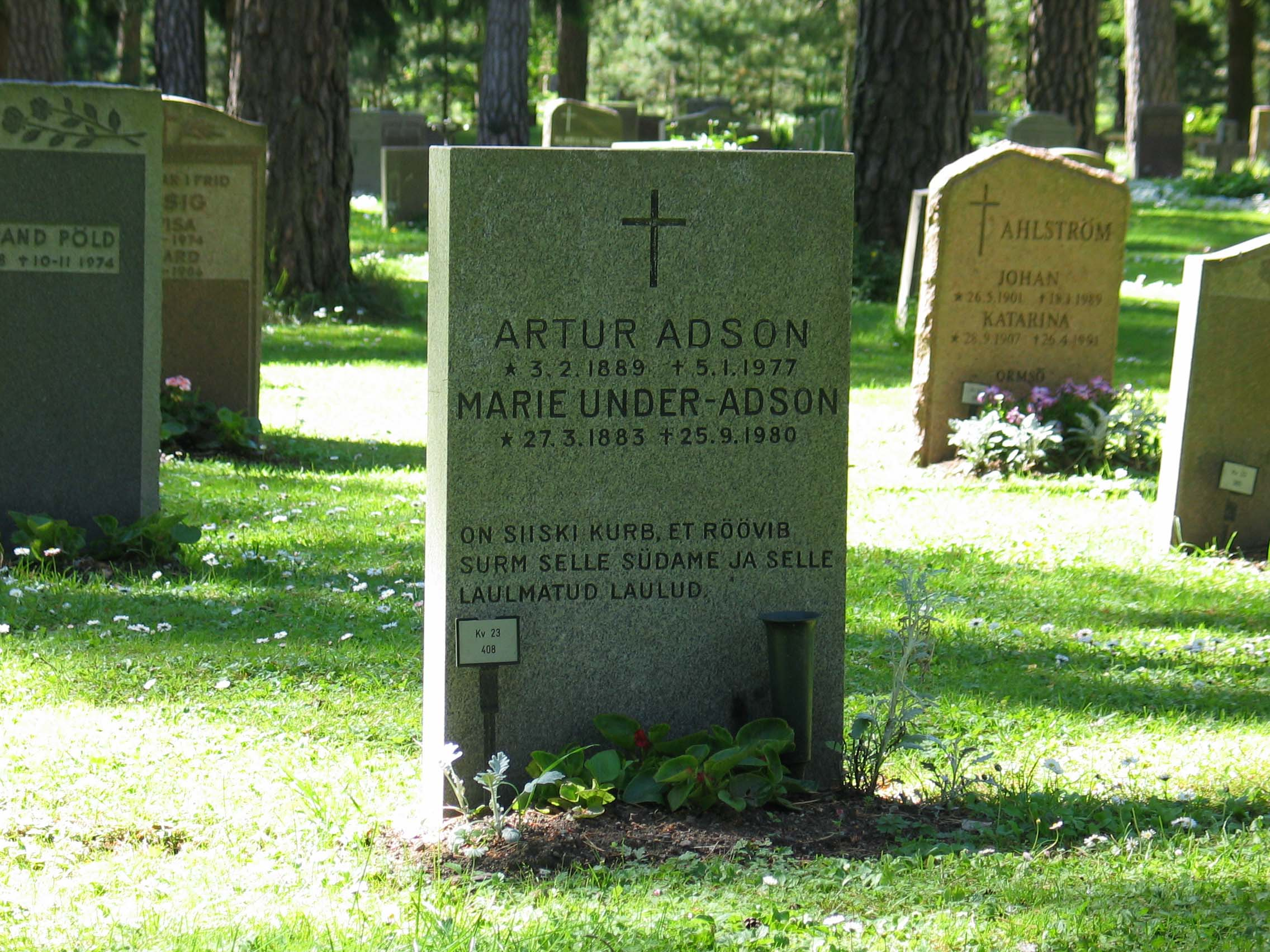
Grave of Artur Adson and Marie Under in Stockholm

With the Soviet occupation of Estonia Artur Adson and his wife fled into exile to Sweden. There, he found employment as an archivist. Both continued their interest in the Estonian literature. Adson died in Stockholm, aged 87. Both Adson and Under are interred at the Skogskyrkogården cemetery in Stockholm.

== Poetry collections ==
- Henge palangoq (1917)
- Vana laterna (1919)
- Roosikrants (1920)
- Kaduvik (1927)
- Katai, kibuvits nink kivi (1928)
- Pärlijõgi (1931)
- Lehekülg ajaraamatust (1937)
- Värsivakk (selected, compiled and foreword by Ivar Grünthal; 1959)
- Rahumäe kannel (1973)
- Luuletused (compiled by Oskar Kruus; 1990)

== Plays ==
- Toomapäev (1928)
- Neli kuningat (1931)
- Lauluisa ja Kirjaneitsi (1930)
- Kolmas tee (penned under the pseudonym Peeter Bollmann; 1932)
- Iluduskuninganna (1933)
- Elav kapital (1934)
- Karu läheb mee lõksu (1936)
- Üks tuvi lendal merele (1937)

== Memoirs ==
- Käsikivi (1922)
- Neli veskit (1946)
- Väikelinna moosekant (1946)
- Ise idas – silmad läänes (1948)
- Siuru-raamat (1949)
- Reisiraamat (1950)
- Lahkumine (1951)
- Kadunud maailm (1954)

== Theatre critiques and history ==
- Das estnische Theater (1933)
- Vilet ja loorbereid (1938)
- Teatriraamat: ajalugu ja isiklikke kogemusi (1958)

== Children's books ==
- Nakits: lugu väikesest lõbusast ja targast koerast (1944)
