= Friedebert Tuglas =

Estonian writer and critic

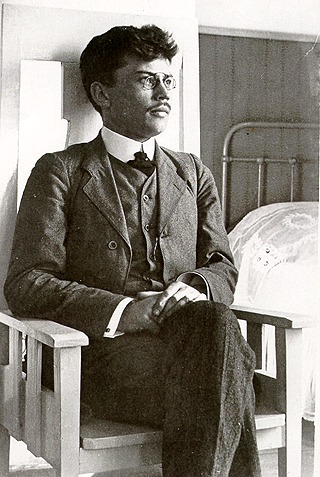
Friedebert Tuglas

Friedebert Tuglas, born Friedebert Mihkelson or Michelson (2 March 1886 – 15 April 1971), was an Estonian writer and critic who introduced Impressionism and Symbolism to Estonian literature.

Tuglas was an innovative stylist, whose wide reading in European letters and social involvement was key in the development of modern Estonian literature. As a leading member of the modernist group Young Estonia, he published and promoted the work of authors such as Gustav Suits, Juhan Liiv , and Jaan Oks, and he translated the work of Aino Kallas.

== Biography ==
Tuglas was born in Ahja, the son of a carpenter, and studied at Hugo Treffner Gymnasium from 1904 to 1905. After imprisonment for revolutionary activities, he went into exile in 1906, living in Finland, Germany, Belgium, Switzerland, and France before returning to Estonia in time for the February revolution of 1917.

Tuglas was a leader of the Estonian literary group Young Estonia (Noor-Eesti) at the beginning of 20th century and later a key member of the literary group Siuru. He was one of the founders of the Estonian Writers' Union and served as its chairman from 1922 to 1923, 1925 to 1927, and 1937 to 1939.

Tuglas wrote in a number of genres, including the short story, novel, and travelogue. His early stories demonstrate many influences, such as Edgar Allan Poe, Russian symbolism, and tendencies of neo-romanticism popular in Scandinavia.

His novel Felix Ormusson, published in 1915, is a complex autobiographical work in the form of a diary. The protagonist — a pseudonym of the author — follows the popular decadent movement and fashions himself after Joris-Karl Huysmans and Charles Baudelaire while he resides in the Estonian countryside with two sisters, Helene and Marion, at a friend's estate. The novel was widely influential in Estonian literature, and it has produced considerable scholarship. Among others, Tiina Ann Kirss has compared the work's modernism and self-fashioning to James Joyce's A Portrait of the Artist as a Young Man.

Drawing by Nikolai Triik, Portrait of Friedebert Tuglase (1928)

In addition to his work as a writer and translator, Tuglas was an important critic, writing monographs on his contemporaries, such as Anton Tammsaare.

Tuglas was granted the title of People's Writer of the Estonian SSR in 1946. The same year he was elected a corresponding member of the Soviet Estonian Academy of Sciences. He subsequently fell into disfavor, was officially blacklisted, and was deprived of his civil rights and excluded from membership in all institutions, including the Writers’ Union, from which he was expelled in 1950. After the Soviet thaw Tuglas was rehabilitated and the title of People's Writer of the Estonian SSR was restored.

Tuglas died in Tallinn in 1971, aged 85, not long after completing his memoirs, acknowledged as a major work in the writer's life. A museum commemorating his life was opened in Tallinn the same year. A short story prize commemorating Tuglas was established in 1971.

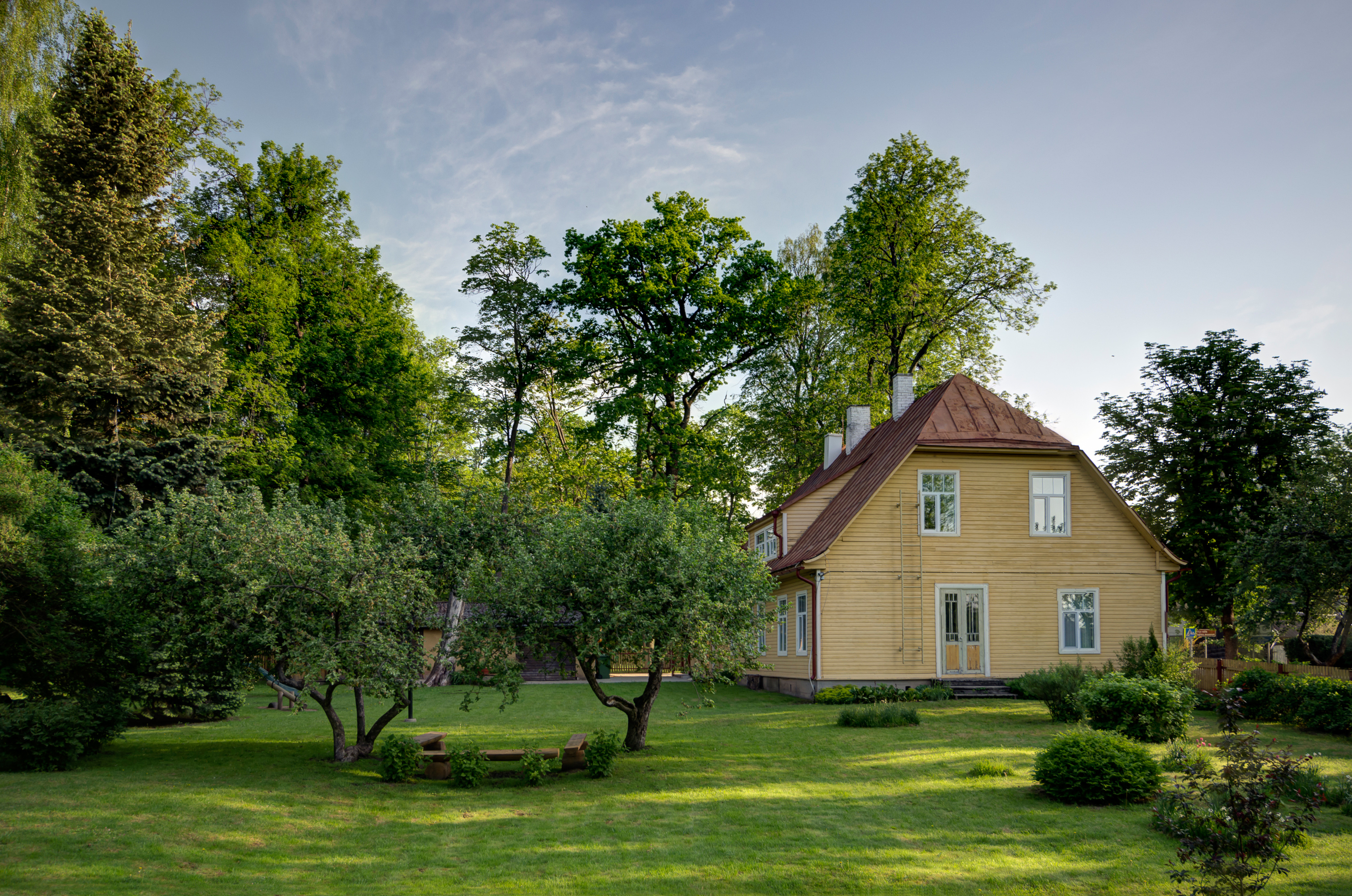
Friedebert Tuglas Museum in Ahja

A selection of Tuglas' stories is available in English, titled The Poet and the Idiot and Other Stories (Central European University Press, Budapest & New York, 2007, translated by Eric Dickens).

== See also ==
- Friedebert Tuglas short story award
