= Gustav Suits =

Estonian poet

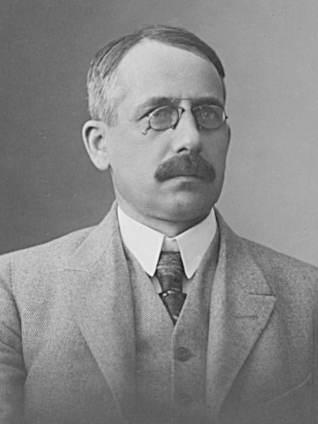
- Born: 18 November 1883; Võnnu, Governorate of Livonia, Russian Empire
- Died: 23 May 1956 (aged 72); Stockholm, Sweden
- Occupations: Poet, writer
- Years active: 1899–1956
- Spouse: Aino Emilia Suits (née Thauvón)

Gustav Suits (30 November [O.S. 18 November] 1883 in Võnnu, Tartu County, Livonia – 23 May 1956 in Stockholm, Sweden) is considered one of the greatest Estonian poets. He was also an early leader of the literary movement group Noor-Eesti (Young Estonia).

== Childhood and education ==
Suits was born in the parish of Võnnu to the teacher Hindrik Suits and Liis Suits (née Kerge). He had an older sister, Ann. In 1895, Suits moved to Tartu, Estonia to study at the Alexander Gymnasium. Suits so enjoyed this bustling university town and its intellectual centers that he became determined to become a part of its literary society. By the time he was 16 years old, the newspaper Uus Aeg (New Time) published his first critical essay. In 1899, the newspaper published his first poem, "Vesiroosid" (Water Lilies).

== Literary career ==
In 1901, Suits began spending his summers tutoring German and French. In the same year, he founded the literary society Kirjanduse Sõbrad (Friends of Literature), a group that included A. H. Tammsaare, who was to become Estonia's greatest novelist. The society published a journal called Kiired (Rays).

Between 1905 and 1916, Suits was closely connected to the Estonian literary movement group known as Noor-Eesti (Young Estonia). In these years, Noor Eesti became publicly active, bringing European influence into Estonian literature and influencing European literature with Estonian styles. Between 1917 and 1919, Suits was politically active in the Estonian Socialist Revolutionary Party.

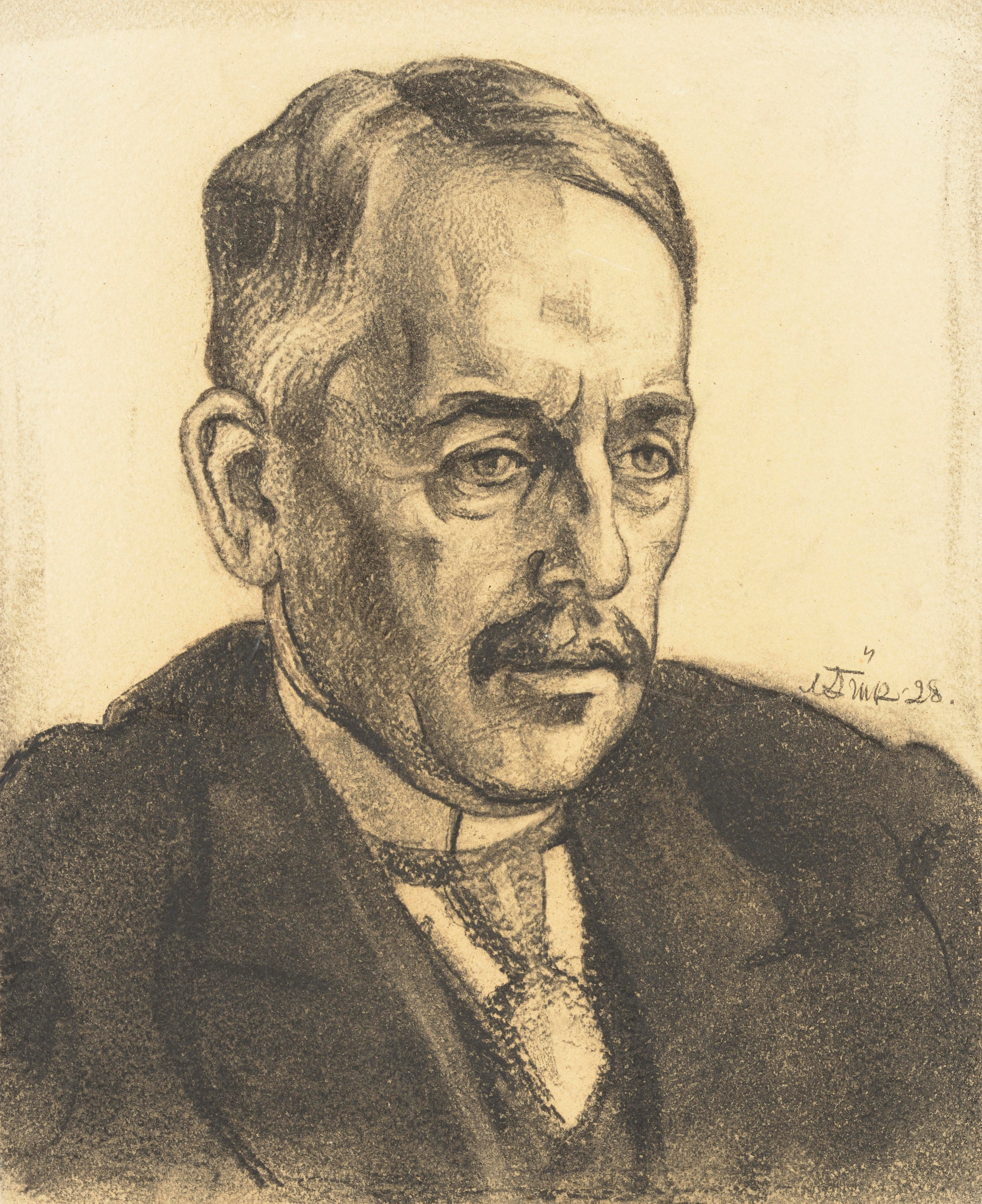
Portrait of Gustav Suits by Nikolai Triik (1928)

In 1921, Suits became the first person to teach literature in Estonian at a post-secondary school level. Until he left the post in 1944, he published a multitude of research essays focusing on Estonian literature. Suits founded the Estonian Academic Literary Society in 1924.

In 1941, Suits experienced the loss of his home. It, along with hundreds of manuscripts, burned to the ground.

In 1944, Suits and approximately 70,000 other Estonians fled Soviet-occupied Estonia. He and his family lived in Stockholm, Sweden, where Suits wrote most of his poetry and many of his research papers.

=== Themes and style ===
Suits's poetry combines extremely personal and very general elements. Frequently, it addresses Estonian history and the fate of humanity. His early poetry reflects the revolution brewing in Estonia between 1900 and 1917 and the youth movement. His poems contain militant, romantic, and disappointed tones after the revolution. Suits frequently used symbolism, metaphors, and allusions.

=== Selected works ===
- The Fire of Life
- The Land of Winds (Tuulemaa)
- All Is But a Dream
- Fire and Wind

== Death ==
In 1956, Suits contracted a serious illness and died. He is buried in Stockholm's Woodland Cemetery.

== See also ==
Estonian Literary Magazine: Gustav Suits by Ele Süvalep
