= Young Estonia =

Estonian literary group

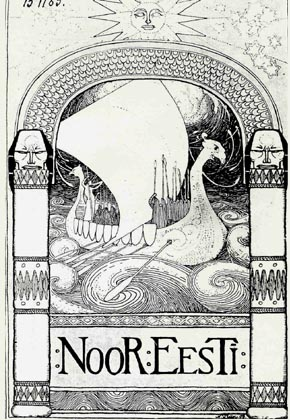
Cover page of Anthology of the Young Estonia, published in 1905.

Young Estonia (Estonian: Noor-Eesti) was a neo-romantic literary group established around 1905 and led by the poet Gustav Suits and short story writer Friedebert Tuglas. Other members of the group included Villem Grünthal-Ridala and Johannes Aavik. Gustav Suits articulated the ideology of the group thus:

"What buoys up and exalts humanity is education. Our slogan is: More culture! More European culture! Let us remain Estonians, but let us become Europeans too. We want to discover the ideas and forms towards which we are impelled by our national spirit, character, and needs on the one hand, and by European culture on the other."

The group's aesthetic programme followed the trends of Finnish, French, German, Scandinavian and Italian literature of the time, comprising elements of Impressionism, Symbolism and Expressionism. The 1917 Russian Revolution dispersed members of the movement, with some fleeing into exile. The group also functioned as a publishing house and published five Young Estonia anthologies between 1905 and 1915.
