= Joseph Alanen =

Finnish painter (1885–1920)

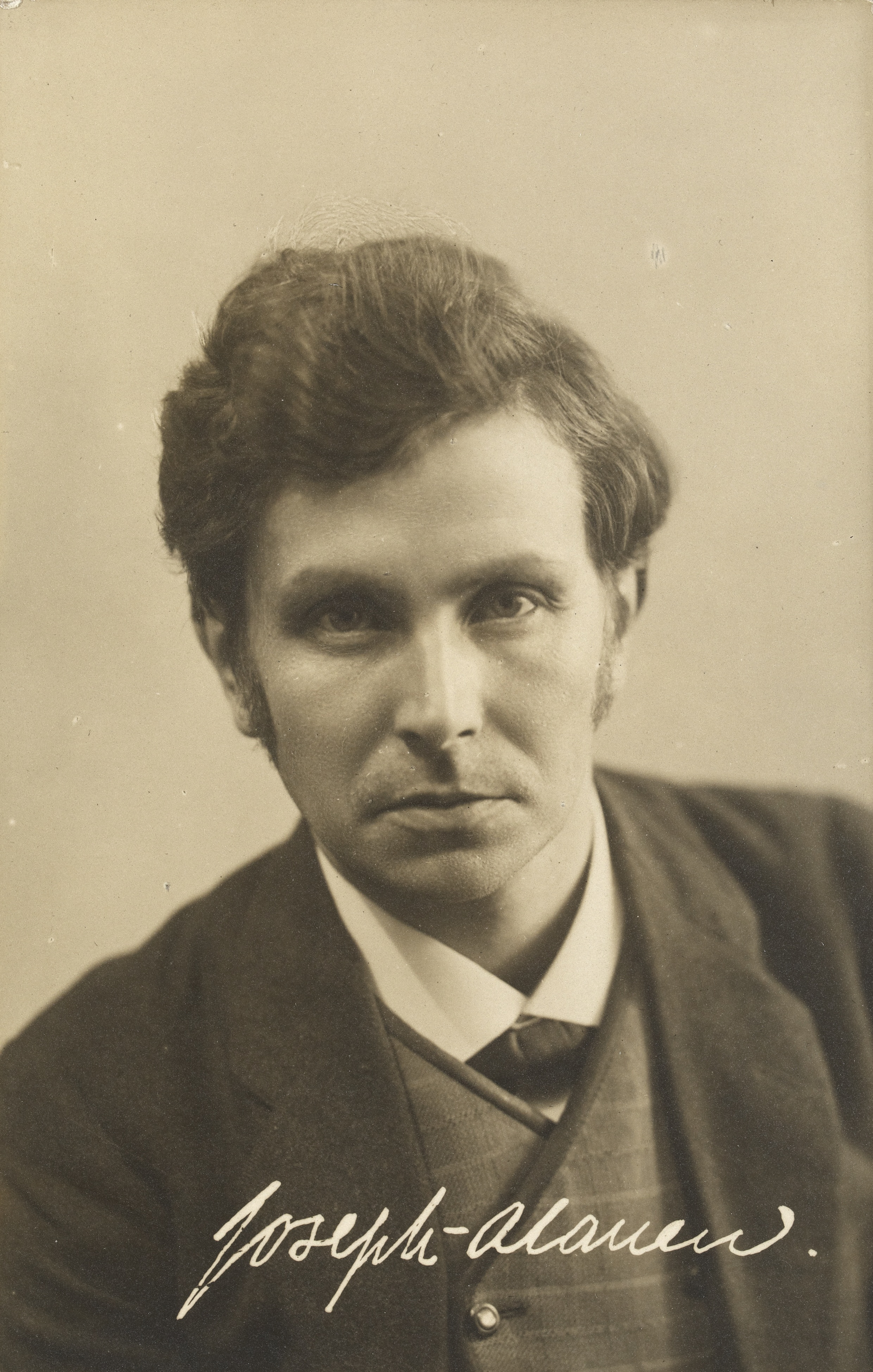
- Born: 2 November 1885; Tampere, Grand Duchy of Finland, Russian Empire
- Died: 6 May 1920 (aged 34); Tampere, Finland
- Occupation: Painter

Otto Joseph Alanen (1885–1920) was a Finnish Art Nouveau painter. He produced over a hundred works depicting scenes from the Kalevala.

== Biography ==
In 1905, Alanen graduated from an industrial school in Tampere with training as an electrician. He studied drawing, painting, and anatomy under Kaarlo Vuori and continued his art studies in Stockholm. He also studied in Berlin and Dresden between 1906 and 1910; there, his teachers included Hans Dahl and Lovis Corinth.

In 1918, Alanen rented a studio in Helsinki together with Aarre Aaltonen and Juhani Pohjanmies.

During the Finnish Civil War, Alanen actively supported the White Guard and illustrated a series of postcards intended to promote Finnish nationalism. He also designed the logo used by the Pohjan Pojat volunteer army led by Hans Kalm against Russian Bolsheviks.

Alanen died of the Spanish flu in 1920.

== Gallery ==
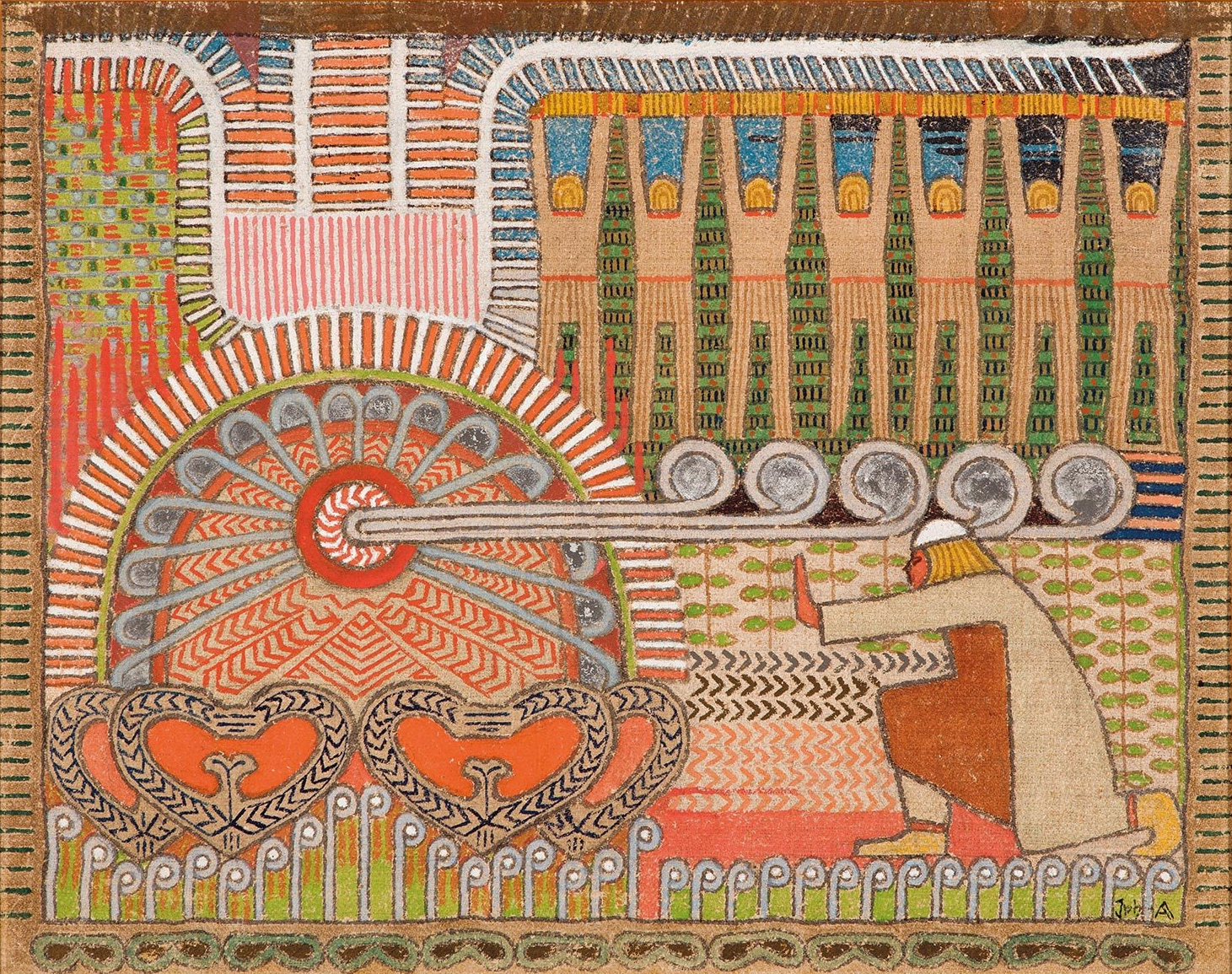
The Forging of the Sampo (Sammon taonta, 1910–1911)

Mirrored, monochrome version of ibid.

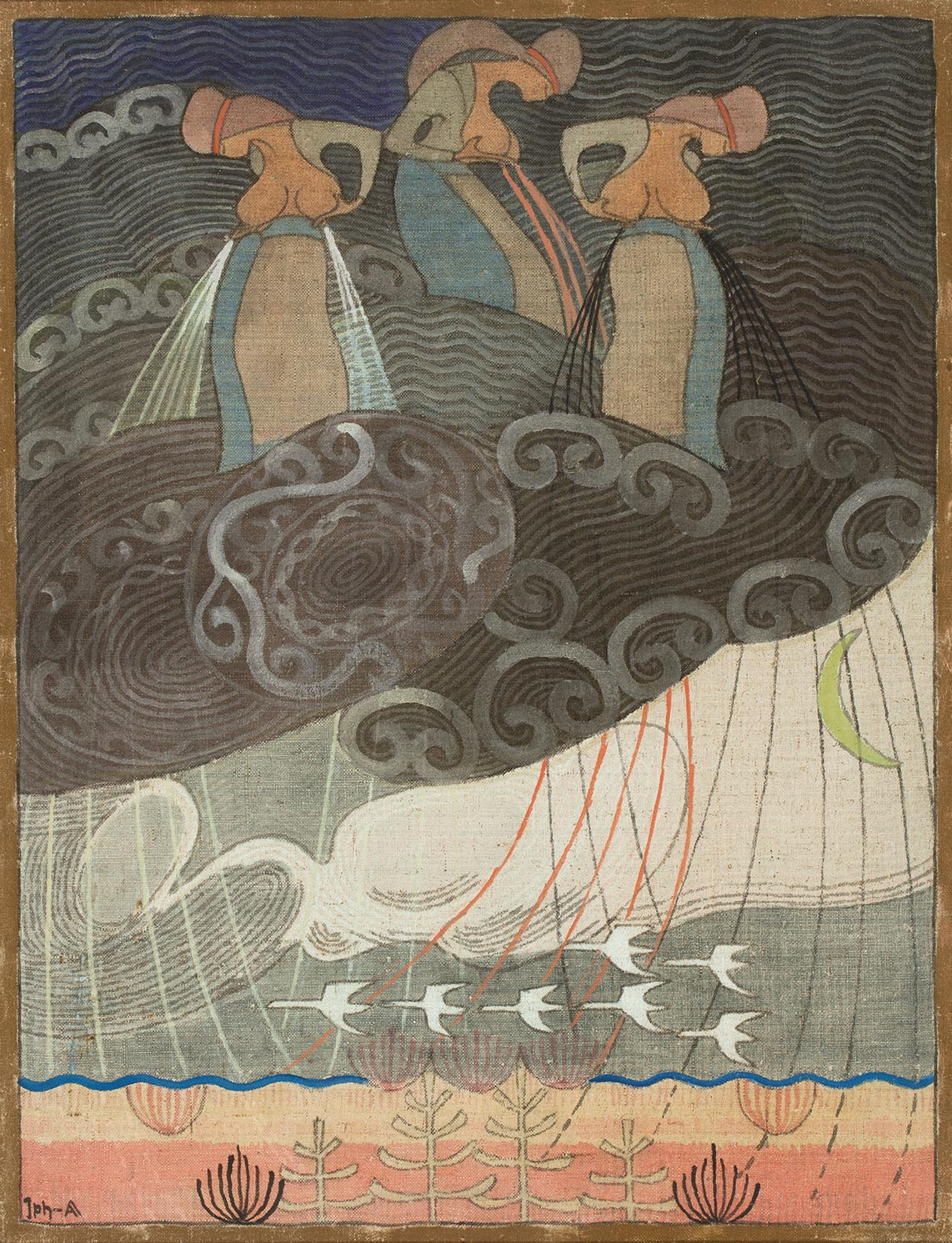
The Origin of Iron (Raudan synty, 1910–1912)

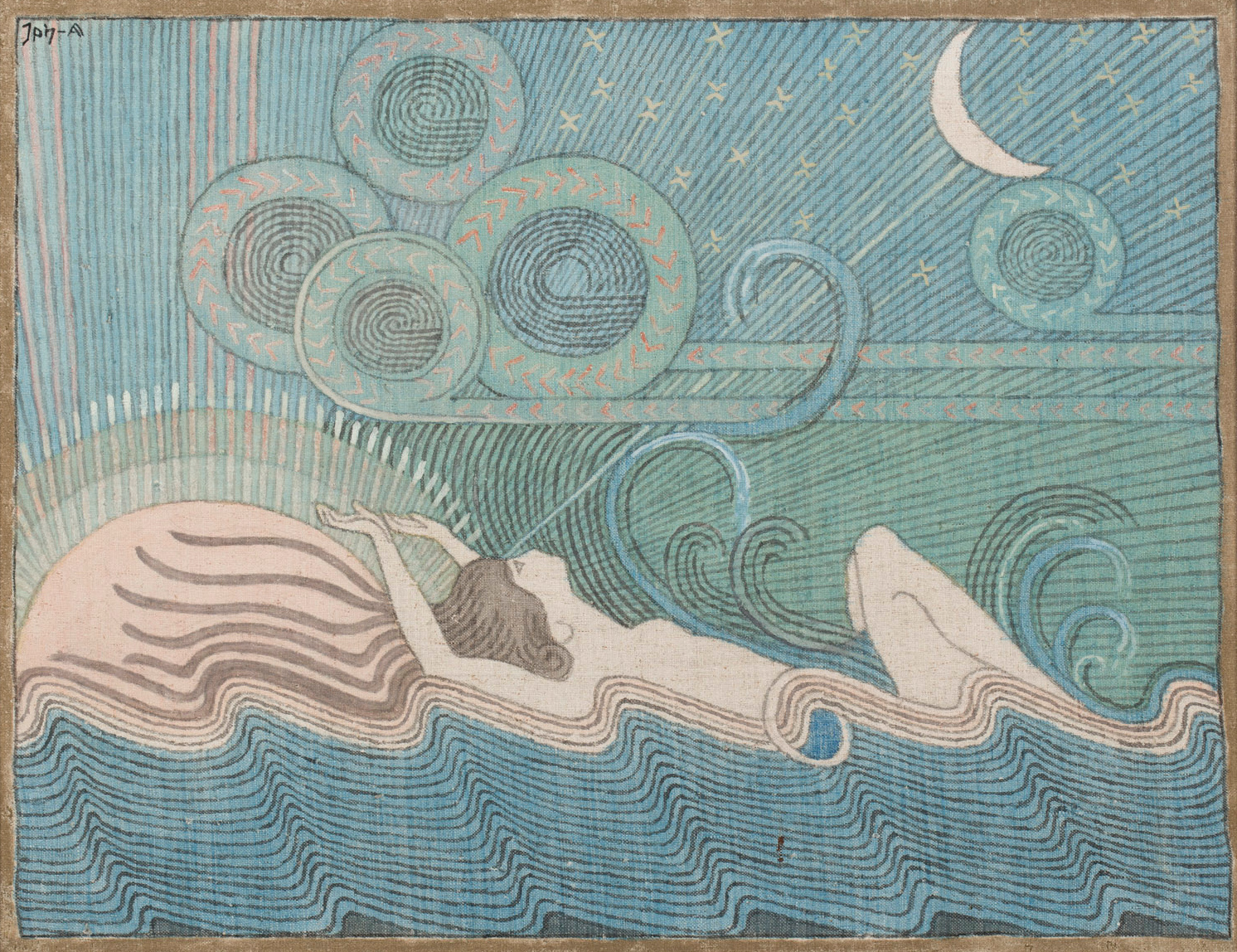
Ilmatar (Ilmatar, 1913–1916)

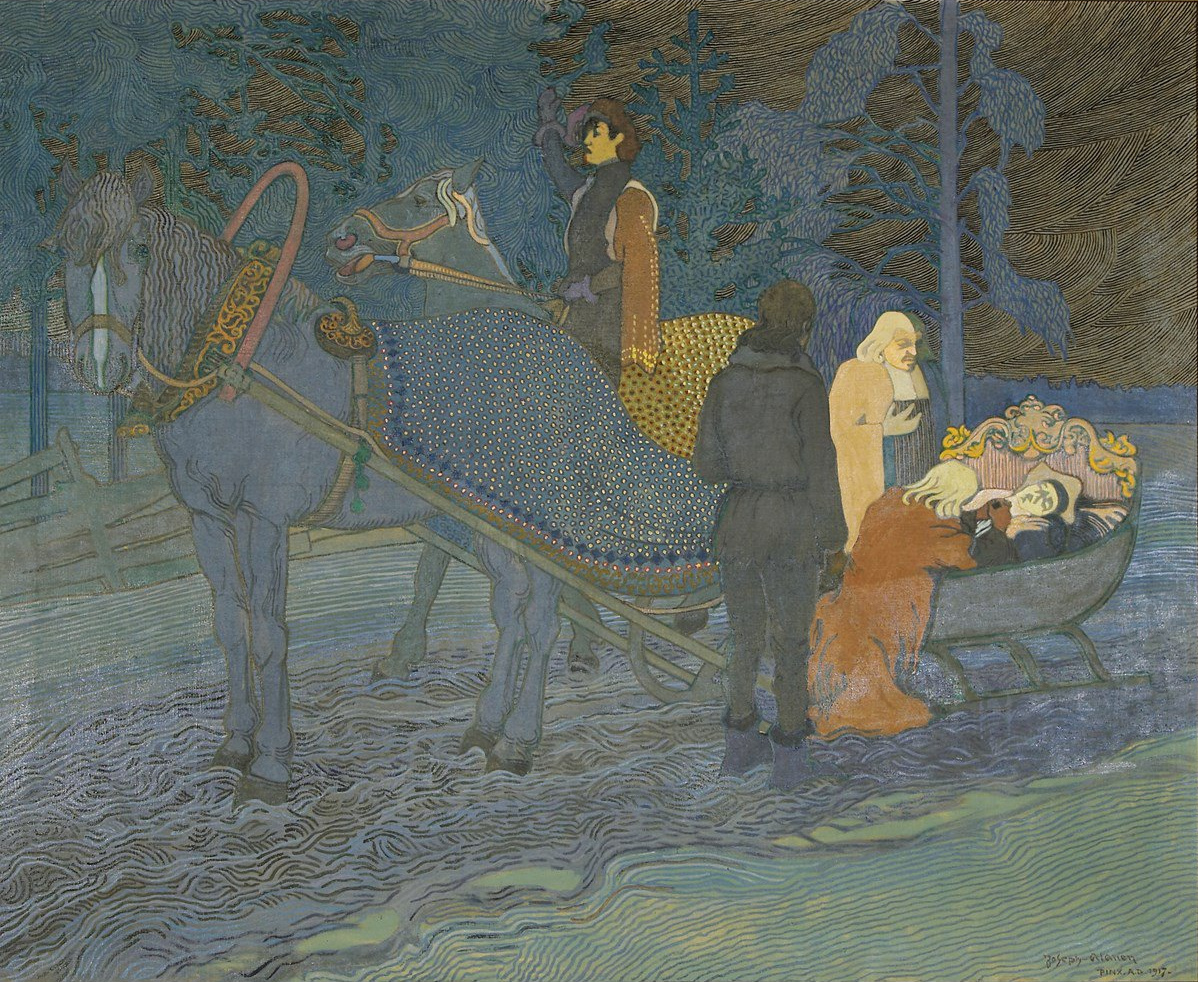
The Death of Agricola (Agricolan kuolema, 1917)

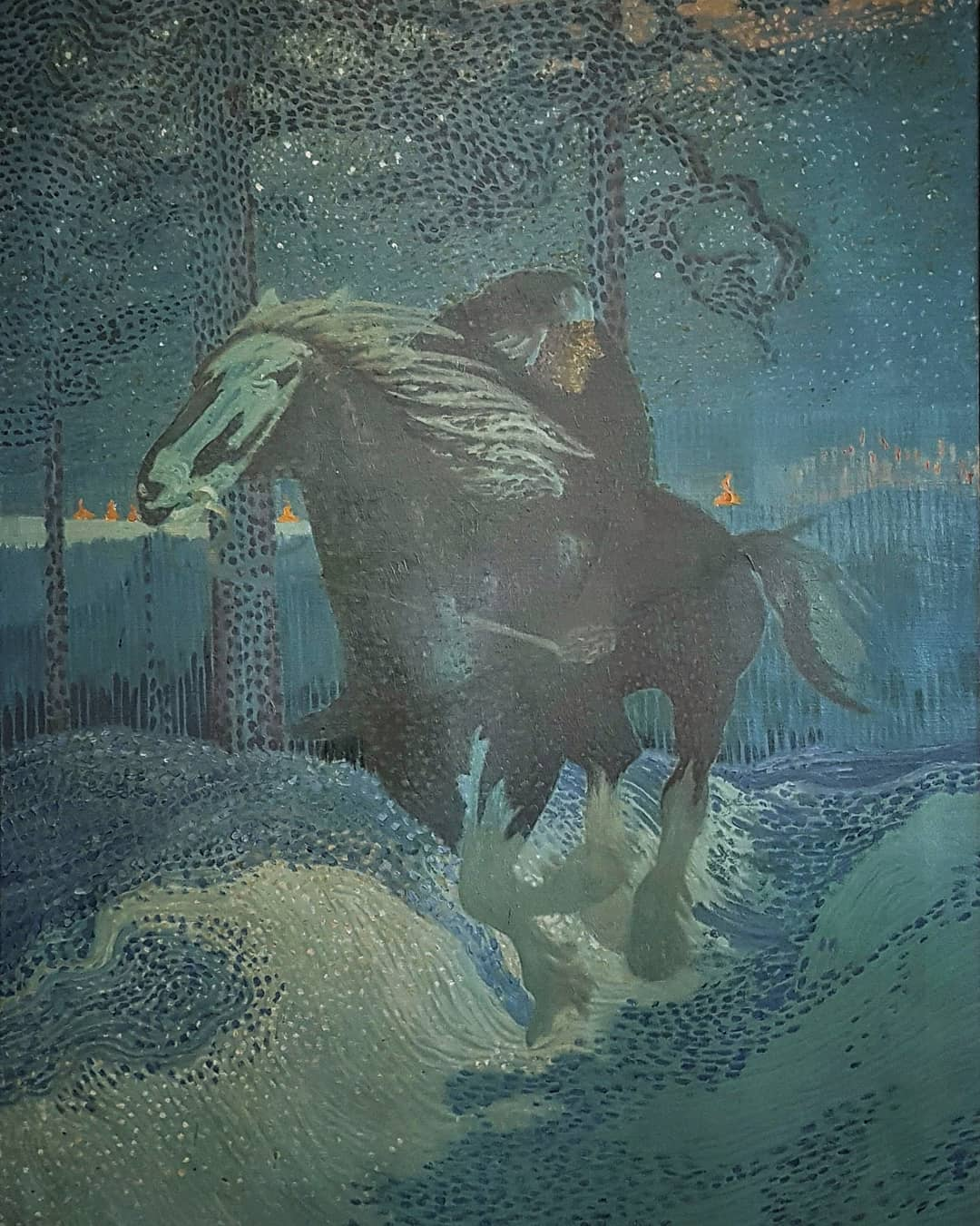
The Escape of Jaakko Ilkka (Jaakko Ilkan pako, Year unknown)

In the Spring of 1918 (Keväällä 1918, 1918)

Postcard of the White Guard, 1920. The caption reads: "When you uphold righteousness, faith, and Väinö's tongue ... no sorcerer can defeat you."
