= Ain Kaalep =

Estonian writer (1926–2020)

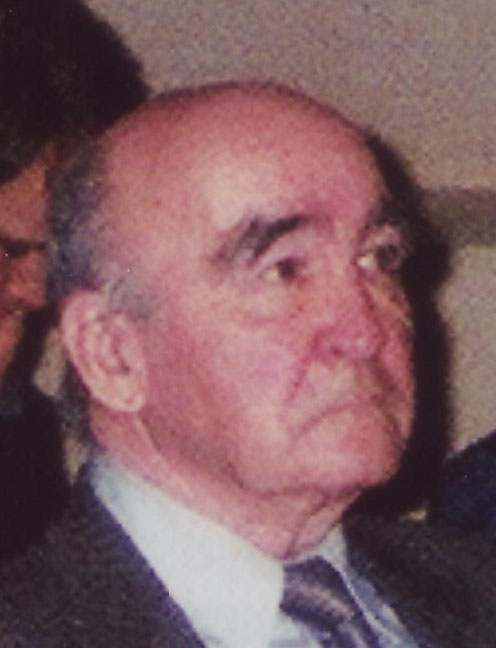
- Ain Kaalep in 2000
- Born: 4 June 1926; Tartu, Estonia
- Died: 9 June 2020 (aged 94); Tartu, Estonia
- Resting place: Elva Cemetery
- Education: Tartu State University
- Occupations: Poet, playwright, literary critic and translator
- Children: Ruuben Kaalep

Ain Kaalep (4 June 1926 – 9 June 2020) was an Estonian poet, playwright, literary critic and translator.

== Biography and career ==
Kaalep was born in Tartu. He studied at the Hugo Treffner Gymnasium and at the University of Tartu, from which he graduated in 1956, specializing in Finno-Ugric languages.

He fought as a volunteer in the Finnish Infantry Regiment 200 and after the war was imprisoned by the Soviet occupation authorities in Estonia.

In 1989–2001, Kaalep was the editor-in-chief of the journal Akadeemia. In 2002 he held a one-year professorship of Liberal Arts at the University of Tartu.

Kaalep was a member of the Congress of Estonia.

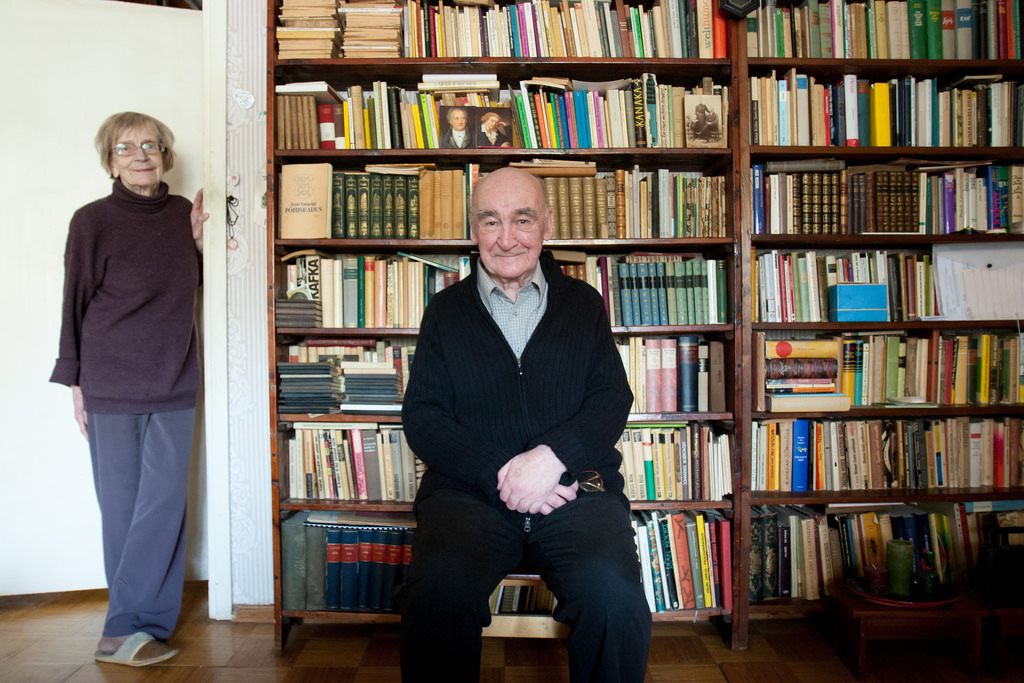
Ain Kaalep and his wife Astrid in 2010

He published mainly poetry collections. In addition, he translated into Estonian poetry and prose works from German (Johannes Robert Becher, Bertolt Brecht, Heimito von Doderer, Günter Eich, Max Frisch, Albert Paris Gütersloh, Hermann Hesse, Hugo von Hofmannsthal, Ödön von Horváth, Hans Henny Jahnn, Gotthold Ephraim Lessing, Heinrich Mann, Georg Maurer, Hans Erich Nossack, Benno Pludra, Friedrich Schiller), Spanish (Vicente Aleixandre, Federico García Lorca, Lope Félix de Vega Carpio, Octavio Paz, José Soler Puig, César Vallejo), French (Charles Baudelaire, Jacques Prévert, To Hoai), Portuguese (Agostinho Neto, Fernando Pessoa), Catalan (Salvador Espriu), Ukrainian (Taras Shevchenko), Polish (Juliusz Słowacki), English, Galician, Provençal, Turkish (Nâzım Hikmet Ran), Tajik, Uzbek, Georgian, Finnish (Arvo Turtiainen), Latin (Ovid), and Ancient Greek (Sophocles, together with Ülo Torpats).

His son is the politician Ruuben Kaalep.

== Honors ==
- Juhan Smuul literary award (1977, 1985)
- Juhan Liiv poetry award (1984)
- Estonian State Cultural Awards (1995, 2002)
- Order of the National Coat of Arms, 3rd class (1996)
- Honorary citizen of Elva (1998)
- Officer of the Legion of Honour (2001)
- University of Tartu award “Contribution to Estonian National Identity” (2008)
- Wiedemann Language Award (2010)
- Jaan Kross literary award (2010)
- Honorary citizen of Tartu and the Grand Cross of Tartu (2014)
- Honorary member of the Pallas society (2016)

== Works ==
- Aomaastikud (1962)
- Samarkandi vihik (poetry, 1962)
- Iidamast ja Aadamast ehk Antimantikulaator (play, 1967)
- Järvemaastikud (1968)
- Mäe veri (Totomauna) (play, 1970)
- Klaasmaastikud (1971)
- Paani surm ja teisi luuletusi (1976)
- Peegelmaastikud (I 1976, II 1980)
- Kuldne Aphrodite ja teisi luuletusi (1986)
- Maavallast ja maailmakirjandusest (essays and literary criticism, 1984)
- Minu silmad ja sinu silmad (play, 1965)
- Kolm Lydiat (essays and literary criticism, 1997)
- Haukamaa laulu (1999)
- Jumalatosin (2008)
- Muusad ja maastikud. Luuletusi aastaist 1945–2008 (2008)
