= Paul Alvre =

Estonian linguist (1921–2008)

Paul Alvre (born Paul Simenson; 3 January 1921 – 18 November 2008) was an Estonian linguist.

== Early life and career ==
Paul Alvre was born in Tartu to parents Juhan (Simenson) Alvre, a shoemaker, and Emilie Kottart. He studied at Hugo Treffner Gymnasium from 1933 until 1940. From 1940 until 1943, he studied at the University of Tartu in the field of Estonian and related languages, and in 1943 at the Faculty of Philosophy of the University of Turku, for a short time also at the Suomenlinna Naval School.

In 1941, during the Soviet occupation of Estonia, Alvre was part of the Forest Brothers (Metsavennad), a group of resistance fighters who hid in the forests of Estonia and engaged in partisan activities in the struggle against Soviet authority. From 1942 until 1943, he was conscripted into the German military during the German occupation of Estonia. In 1943, he fled to Finland and served as a volunteer in the Finnish Navy for a year during the Finnish-Soviet Continuation War, obtaining the rank of lieutenant. In 1944, he returned to Estonia with other Estonian soldiers of the Finnish Infantry Regiment 200, where he fought the Soviet occupation, but returned to Finland later the same year.

After World War II, Alvre graduated in 1946 from the University of Helsinki. From 1946 to 1948 he was a lecturer in the Estonian language at the Jyväskylä Pedagogical Institute. Following the extradition of the Estonian soldiers to the Soviet Union in 1948, in which Alvre managed to escape from the prison train, he worked as a teacher of Estonian and Latin in Viljandi: from 1948 until 1949 at the Viljandi Trade Technical School, from 1949 until 1951 at Viljandi Secondary School No. 2, and from 1949 until 1960 at the local medical school. From 1961 to 1967, he was the editor of Valgus publishing house. In 1966, he defended his doctoral degree in philology at the University of Tartu.

In 1968, Alvre became lecturer at the Department of Finno-Ugric Languages at Tartu State University, and a professor at the university from 1971 until 1993. Alvre was Vice Dean at the university from 1979 until 1991. In 1993, he became professor emeritus with the university, but continued to teach. During his years of work, he taught courses in the history, semantics, phraseology and historical morphology of the Finnish written language, Votic language, the comparative grammar of the Finnic languages, the vocabulary and morphology of the Uralic languages. Under his supervision, fifteen dissertations were completed. In his research, Alvre focused primarily on the morphology and vocabulary of the Finnic languages. He published nearly 550 research papers. He also compiled a number of original teaching aids for students.

== Personal life and death ==
In 1977, Alvre married medical scientist Lea Boston (née Tiikmaa). Alvre died on 18 November 2008, aged 87. He was buried at Maarja Cemetery in Tartu.

== Recognition ==
- Honorary member of the Finno-Ugric Society (1990)
- Honorary Doctor of the University of Helsinki (1994)
- Order of the White Star, Class IV (1998)

== Publications ==
- Soome keele õpik iseõppijaile (1967)
- Soome keeleõpetuse reeglid (1969)
- Soome-eesti vestlussõnastik (1969)
- Soome sõnakonstruktsioone ja väljendeid I–VII (1977–1979)
- Udmurdi ja eesti keele kõrvutavaid tekste ja väljendeid (1985, one of the compilers)
- Soome keele võõrsõnad (1988)
- Eesti-soome-eesti eksitussõnastik (1993, with Raul Vodja)
