= Pääsuke =

Family name

Pääsuke is an Estonian surname (meaning swallow). Notable people with the surname include:

- Johannes Pääsuke (1892–1918), photographer and filmmaker
- Tiit Pääsuke (born 1941), painter
