= Finnish Infantry Regiment 200 =

Finnish military unit mostly made up of Estonian volunteers during WW II

JR 200
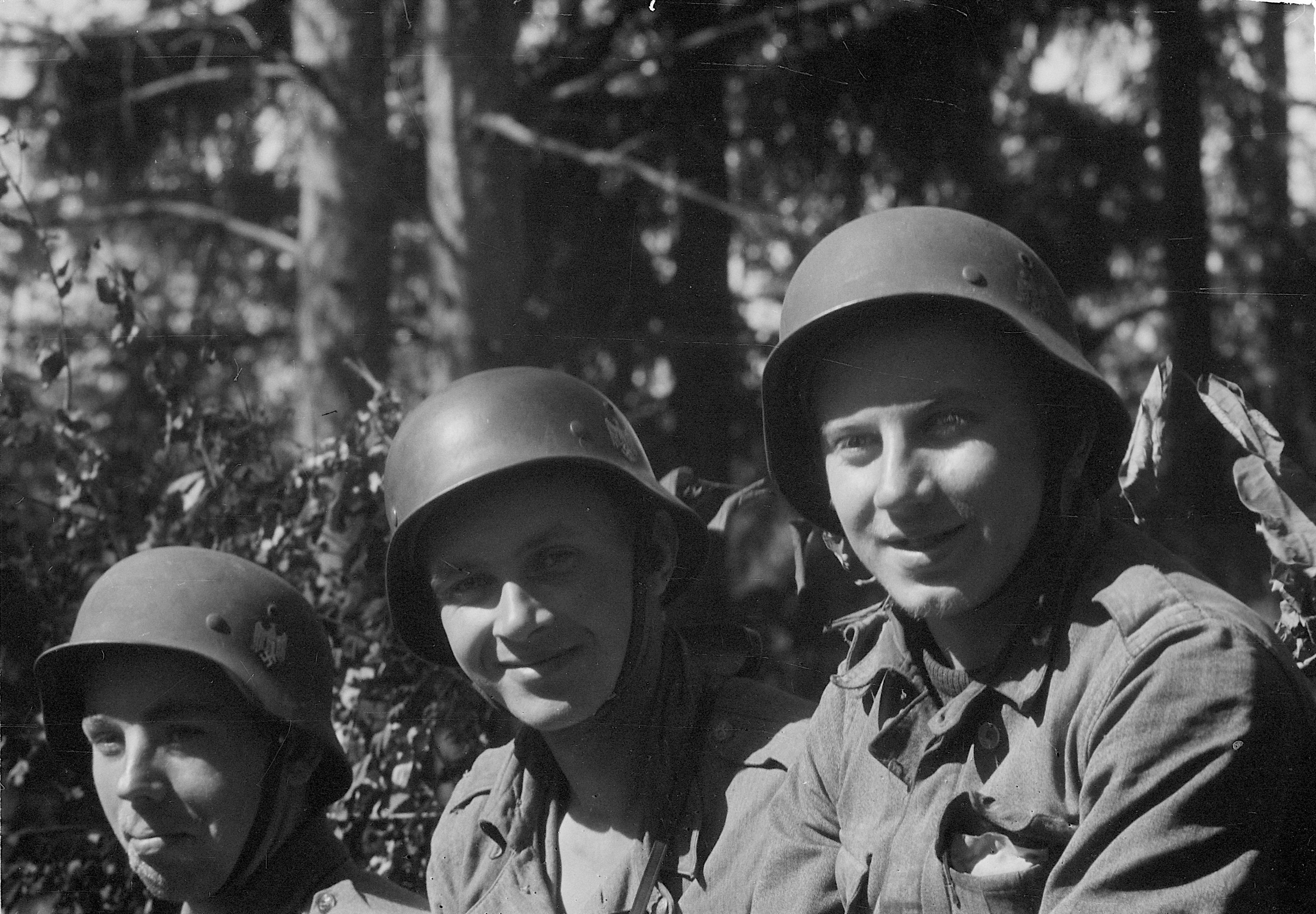
- Estonian volunteers in Finland during the Continuation War
- Active: 8 February 1944 – 12 August 1944
- Country: Estonia
- Allegiance: Finland
- Type: Foreign volunteer
- Role: Infantry
- Size: Regiment
- Nicknames: Finnish: Suomen-pojat; Estonian: soomepoisid English: Finnish Boys
- Mottos: For the freedom of Finland and the honour of Estonia
- Engagements: World War II: Vyborg–Petrozavodsk offensive; Tartu Offensive

Infantry Regiment 200 (Finnish: Jalkaväkirykmentti 200, JR 200, Estonian: Jalaväerügement 200, JR 200) or soomepoisid (Finnish Boys) was a unit in the Finnish army during World War II made up mostly of Estonian volunteers, who preferred to fight against the Soviet Union in the ranks of the Finnish army instead of the armed forces of Germany.

== Background ==
In September 1939, the Soviet Union entered World War II by first invading Poland from the east and then de facto occupying the Baltic states. In August 1940, the Republic of Estonia was officially annexed by the Soviet Union. During the following year, thousands of Estonians were arrested, executed, or sent to the Soviet concentration camp system in Russia. After war broke out between the Soviet Union and Germany on June 22, 1941, the Soviet authorities in occupied Estonia, in violation of the international law, coerced about 30,000 Estonians into service in the retreating Red Army. Although initially the Germans were perceived as liberators by most Estonians, it was soon realized that they were but another occupying power. However, with the Soviet atrocities fresh in mind, during the early stages of German occupation many young Estonian men volunteered for the Estonian units within the German Army to fight against the Soviet Union. In 1944, Estonia, along with Latvia, became one of only two non-German speaking countries occupied by Germany where a general conscription-mobilization was carried out by the occupational authorities.

Against this background, joining the armed forces of Finland, a kindred nation, appeared a reasonable alternative for those who wished to fight for the freedom of Estonia and against the advancing Red Army, but who for ideological reasons or historical grievances were unwilling to do it in the German uniform. During the Estonian War of Independence, some 4,000 Finnish volunteers—including the 1st Finnish Volunteer Corps regiment under leadership of Colonel Martin Ekström and Pohjan Pojat (“Sons of the North”) brigade under leadership of Colonel Hans Kalm—had at a crucial moment helped to turn the tide of the war and rout the invading Red Army. The Estonian volunteers in the Finnish Army, to indicate a debt of honor, picked "For the freedom of Finland and the honor of Estonia" as their motto.

== Service in the Finnish armed forces ==
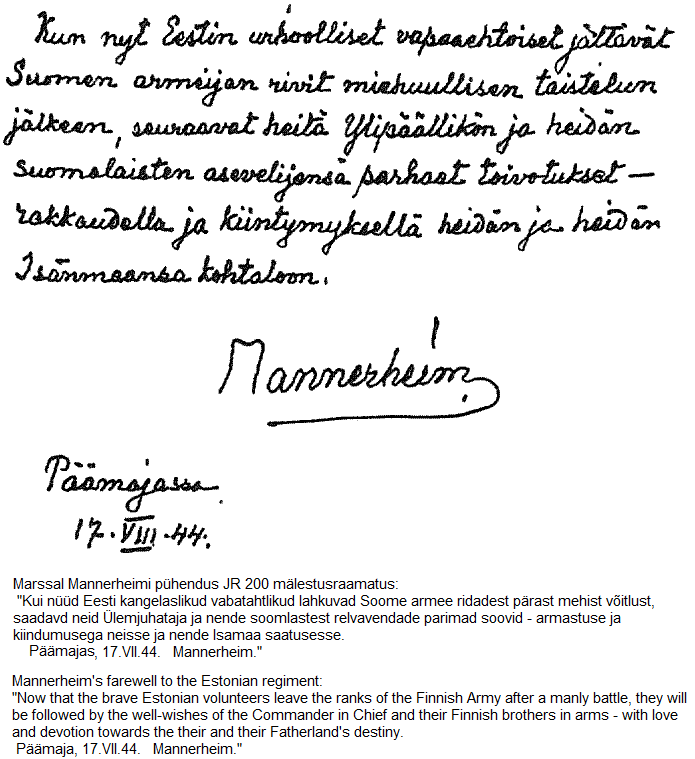
Marshal of Finland Carl Gustaf Emil Mannerheim's farewell to the Estonian regiment JR 200, 17 July 1944

While there had been many Estonian volunteers in the Finnish Army already during the Winter War, the first men of JR 200 crossed the Gulf of Finland in early spring of 1943. It was a dangerous journey to make, as the gulf was ablaze with war and ravaged by storms, and the German authorities did not allow Estonians to cross over to Finland, which also put the Finnish authorities in an awkward position. The first batch of volunteers formed the third battalion of Infantry Regiment 47. In the autumn of the same year, when the German authorities called into service those born in 1925, more volunteers arrived from Estonia. The volunteers made their way over the Gulf independently, or with the help of the "hawks" (Finnish: haukat). The Hawks were Estonian volunteers working for the S-office which was part of the secret service of the Finnish headquarters. The hawks were equipped with speed boats and many of them had served in the reconnaissance unit Erna, also made up of Estonian volunteers, in the early days of Operation Barbarossa.

On February 8, 1944, Finnish Field Marshal Mannerheim ordered the formation of the Estonian volunteer regiment, Infantry Regiment 200. The regiment consisted of two four-company infantry battalions (Companies 1–8), the 13th Mortar Company and the 14th Anti-Tank Company. On May 4, 1944, there were 1,973 Estonians and 361 Finns in Infantry Regiment 200, including 67 officers and 165 non-commissioned officers. The regiment took part in the defensive battles of summer 1944 on the Finnish front. They were sent to the front, on June 10, 1944, as part of the Finnish 10th Division, and they took up positions around the Bay of Viipuri. The regiment became known as "The Finnish Boys" (Finnish: Suomen-pojat, Estonian: soomepoisid).

== JR 200 in Estonia ==
In August 1944, the Germans began their withdrawal from Estonia. The war in Finland was nearly over, and the men of Infantry Regiment 200 wished to return to Estonia and continue their fight. The regiment had been withdrawn from the front and had been following the developments south of the water anxiously. On August 1, 1944, it was broadcast over the Yleisradio that the Finnish government and President Ryti were to resign. On the next day, Aleksander Warma announced that the National Committee of the Republic of Estonia had sent a telegram, which stated: "Estonians return home!" On the following day, the Finnish government received a letter from the Estonians. It had been signed in the name of "all national organisations of Estonia" by Captain Karl Talpak, minister Aleksander Warma and several others. In the letter, the Finnish government was asked to send the Estonian volunteer regiment back to Estonia fully equipped.

It was then announced that JR 200 would be disbanded and that the volunteers were free to return home. An agreement had been reached with the Germans, and the Estonians were promised amnesty if they were to return. The men wanted to return armed and as a unit, but if their wishes would be followed was another question. The uncertainty of the situation made the decision difficult, but 9 out of 10 decided to return. As soon as they landed, the regiment was sent to perform a counter-attack against the Soviet 3rd Baltic Front, which had managed a break-through at the Tartu front and was threatening the capital Tallinn.

== Notable 'Finnish boys' ==
- Ivar Grünthal (1924–1996), Estonian writer
- Ilmar Jaks (1923–2019), Estonian writer
- Ülo Jõgi (1921–2007), Estonian soldier and war historian
- Ottniell Jürissaar (1924–2014), an Estonian poet and conductor
- Ain Kaalep (1926–2020), Estonian poet, playwright, literary critic, and translator
- Raimond Kaugver (1926–1992), Estonian writer
- Henn-Ants Kurg (1898–1943), Estonian military colonel and diplomat
- Juhan Ross (1925–2002), Estonian atmospheric physicist
- Endel Ruberg (1917–1989), Estonian artist, naturalist, and humanitarian
- Vello Salo (1925–2019), Estonian Catholic cleric, essayist, and translator
- Ilmar Talve (1919–2007), Estonian writer and ethnologist
- Arved Viirlaid (1922–2015), Estonian writer
