= Ülo Torpats =

Estonian philologist and translator

Ülo Torpats (15 November 1920, in Tartu – 20 January 1988, in Tartu) was an Estonian philologist and translator.

Torpats graduated from Hugo Treffner Gymnasium in 1940. In 1951, he graduated from Tartu State University with a degree in classical philology. From 1951 to 1953, he worked at the Estonian Academy of Agriculture. From 1955 to 1956 and again from 1960, he was a lecturer at the Department of Western European Literature and Classical Philology of the University of Tartu. From 1971 until 1982, he was a lecturer at the university's Department of Foreign Languages.

== Works ==
- Näiteid rooma luulest (1970)
- Lingua latina in medicina (1970, with L. Gross and R. Kleis)
- Studium latinum (1975, with L. Gross and R. Kleis)
- Ladina-eesti sõnaraamat = Glossarium Latino-Estonicum (1986, one of the authors)
- Rooma kirjanduse antoloogia, edited by Torpats and Ain Kaalep
- Kreeka kirjanduse antoloogia; Kuningas Oidipus by Sophocles, translated by Torpats and Ain Kaalep
- Eestlaste endeemilistest haigustest, by Karl Ernst von Baer, translated by Ülo Torpats
- Narruse kiitus, by Erasmus, illustrated by Hans Holbein the Younger and translated by Ülo Torpats
