= Raimond Kaugver =

Estonian writer (1926–1992)

Raimond Kaugver (25 February 1926 Rakvere – 24 January 1992 Tallinn) was an Estonian writer.

In 1943, he escaped to Finland and joined there with Finnish Infantry Regiment 200. In 1944, he returned to Estonia. From 1945 to 1950, he spent in a prison camp at Vorkuta in Siberia; accused as a political prisoner.

From 1961, he was a professional writer. He lived in Tallinn. From 1964, he was a member of Estonian Writers' Union.

He died in 1992 and is buried in Metsakalmistu Cemetery.

== Selected works ==
- 1956: short story "Doktor Kollom" ('Doctor Kollom')
- 1966: novel "Nelikümmend küünalt" ('Forty Candles')
- 1982: novel "Disko" ('Disco')
- 1983: novel "Vana mees tahab koju" ('An Old Man Wants to Go Home')
- 1988: short story "Elupäästja" ('The Rescuer')
- 1988: novel "Kas ema südant tunned sa?" ('Do You Know Your Mother's Heart?')
