= Hugo Treffner Gymnasium =

School in Tartu, Estonia

Hugo Treffner High School
- Hugo Treffneri Gümnaasium
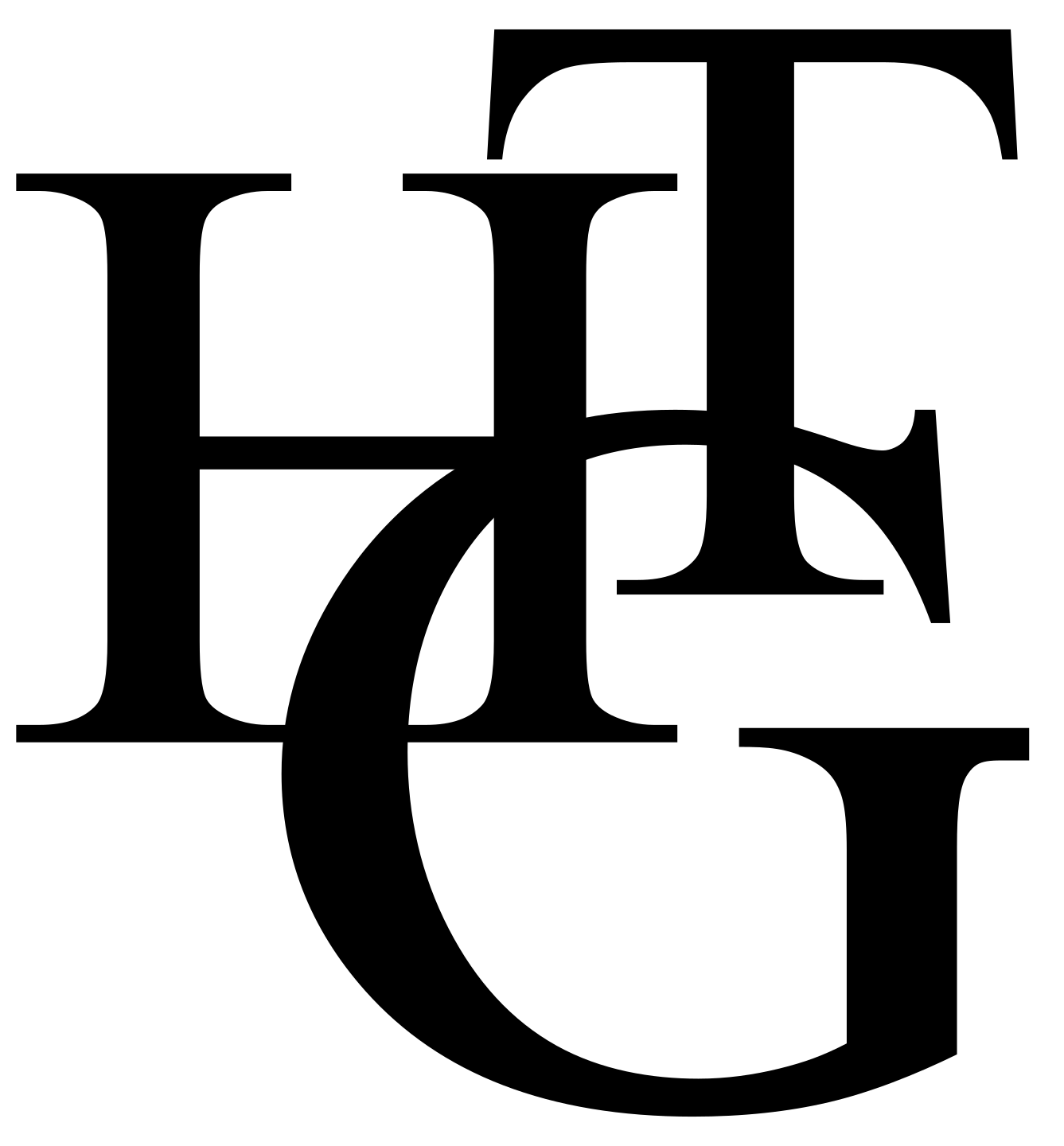

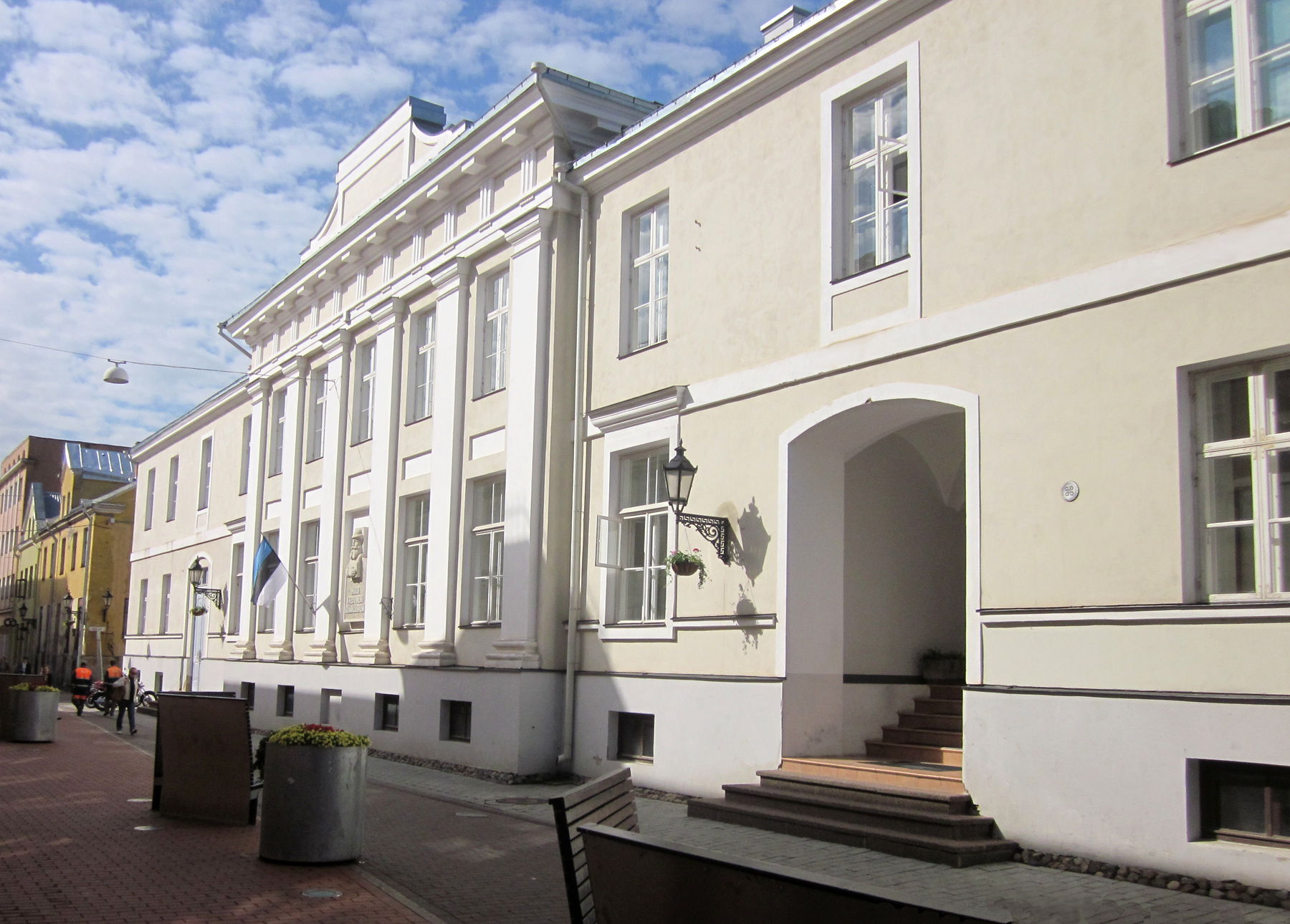
- Hugo Treffner Gymnasium in 2012

Location
- Munga 12; Tartu, Tartu County, 51007; Estonia; 58°22′56″N 26°43′14″E

Information
- School type: State-funded secondary school
- Motto: Non scholae, sed vitae discimus (We do not learn for the school, but for life)
- Religious affiliation: Secular
- Founded: 1883
- Founder: Hugo Treffner
- Status: Open
- Director: Ott Ojaveer
- Head teacher: Aime Punga
- Teaching staff: Priidu Beier amongst others
- Grades: 10–12
- Enrollment: c. 540
- Average class size: 36
- Language: Estonian
- Newspaper: Miilang
- Alumni: A. H. Tammsaare; Harald Riipalu; Edgar V. Saks
- Website: www.htg.tartu.ee

Hugo Treffner Gymnasium (Estonian: Hugo Treffneri Gümnaasium; abbreviated as HTG) is a secondary school in Tartu, Estonia with special emphasis on science education. Founded by Hugo Treffner, it was the only large secondary school in 19th-century Estonia with predominantly Estonian students and no age restrictions. During the Estonian national awakening, it greatly contributed to the numbers of Estonian intellectuals.

== History ==
Hugo Treffner Gymnasium was founded by Baltic German Hugo Hermann Fürchtegott Treffner on 7 December 1883. The Treffner family originated from Austria, connected to the royal family in the 1600s. During the Thirty Years' War the family fled to Estonia. By the end of 1884, there were a total of 65 students studying various subjects in German. The school was special for offering secondary education to peasants. At the end of the year, a prep class was opened to teach languages and Treffner became a 4-class progymnasium. In 1886 and 1887, another 2 prep courses were opened on the primary level. In 1889, the official language changed to Russian.

Originally the classes took place in rented rooms. In 1886, Hugo Treffner bought a house for the school, which was expanded in 1887, 1888 and 1906. The building would be the school's residence until 1919. The house was situated at the present site of the Hugo Treffner statue in Tartu. The original building was destroyed in 1941 by German troops invading Tartu.

The schools development was at a low from 1892 to 1897, caused by crop failure and peasants leaving the school. After that period, attendance rose sharply once again. The students of the early 20th century were involved in several nationalistic underground groups, which later evolved into the literary group "Young Estonia" (Noor-Eesti).

The school was recognized as a private gymnasium in 1907. The first director and founder of the school Hugo Treffner died on 29 February 1912. Before his death, the director position fell to a board composed of Mihkel Aavik, Nikolai Beldjugin, Konstantin Treffner and Vladimir Uspenski; in addition Cornelius Treffner, brother of Hugo Treffner, held a right to vote on matters proposed. The school was named Vladimir Uspenski Private Gymnasium after Hugo Treffner died. Uspenski, however, signed the school over to the alumni group "Upkeep of the Gymnasium Founded by Hugo Treffner Group". The group named Uspenski director, but when he left the faculty, Nikolai Sahharov became the director of the school, officially named "Gymnasium Founded by Hugo Treffner".

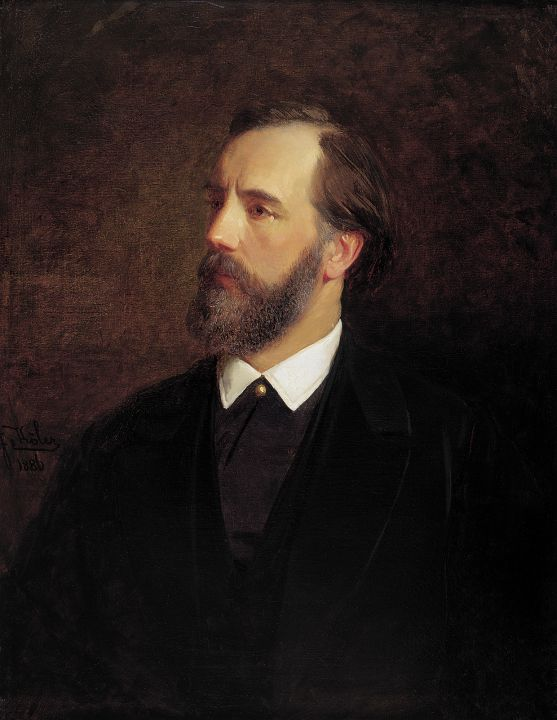
Hugo Treffner, the founder

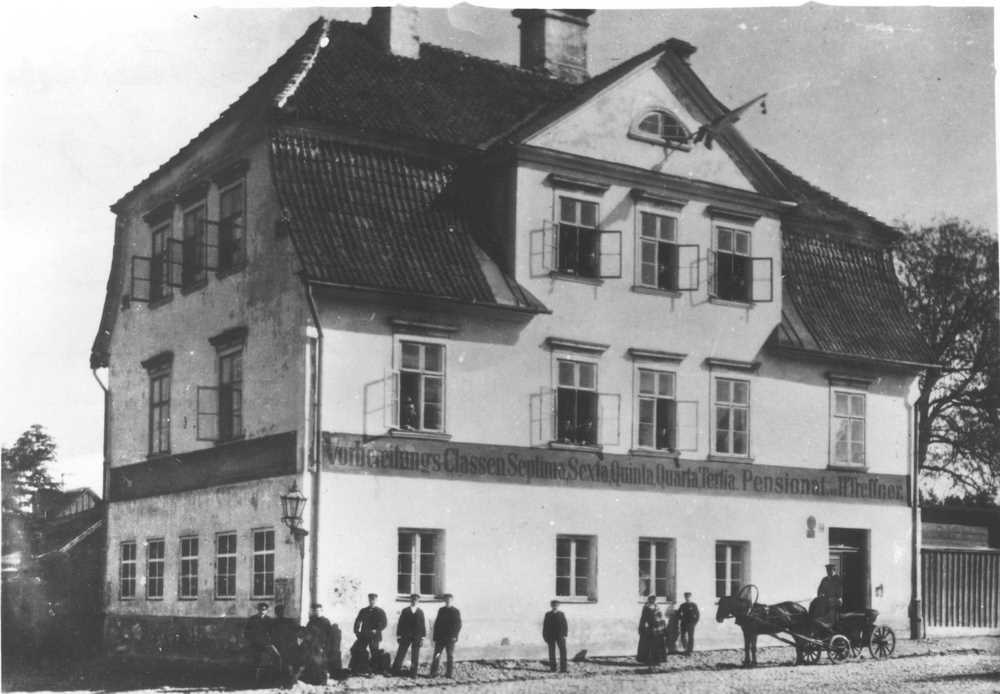
Treffner Gymnasium, 1895

In 1917, Konstantin Treffner, H. Treffner's first cousin once removed, became the director of the school. During the German occupation of Estonia in 1918, the school switched to teaching in Estonian. The same year, Hugo Treffner Gymnasium and Tartu Alexander Gymnasium were merged and in February 1919, the school got a new home, where it is situated to this day. During the merge, the school gained the inventory and library of Alexander Gymnasium. In the Estonian War of Independence, 230 students of Hugo Treffner Gymnasium were drafted, seven were killed in battle.

In 1921, the school had 1,019 students; however that number was halved in the next 10 years, mainly due to the government's policy to promote trade schools over secondary education. The school began accepting students based on quality, not quantity. This led to Hugo Treffner Gymnasium becoming one of Estonia's most prestigious schools. Since 1923, the school officially had 2 branches: H. Treffner Primary School and H. Treffner Gymnasium.

In 1933, the school celebrated its 50th birthday, which was attended by notable Estonian public figures, such as Jaan Tõnisson, Jüri Jaakson, Konstantin Päts, and others. Mr. Päts, the Estonian head of state, specifically praised the school and stated in his speech, "We could doubt if we, in our nation’s life, would have made it this far, if it weren’t for Treffner Gymnasium."

With the education reform of 1934, the school was divided into a primary school (forms 1–4), middle school (forms 5–9) and gymnasium (forms 10–12). In 1937, the middle school was further divided into a progymnasium following a 4-year primary school education (forms 5–9) and a secondary science school following a 6-year primary school education (forms 7–9). The gymnasium would still accept students from either.

During the interwar period, the school had nine official clubs: a drama club, a humanities club, an abstinence group, a classical arts club, a chess club, music, sport, a religious-ethical group and a natural sciences club. Since 1926, the school paper Miilang was circulated.

With the Soviet annexation of Estonia in 1940, Hugo Treffner Primary School was closed, and Hugo Treffner Progymnasium, Hugo Treffner Secondary Sciences School and Hugo Treffner Gymnasium were merged into Tartu Secondary School No. 4. Johannes Valgma was appointed the new director. During the German occupation of 1941–1944, this school was closed and on 2 January 1942, Hugo Treffner Gymnasium was reopened, under the leadership of August Raielo. The school was situated in the building of the Tartu Secondary School No. 1.

In 1944, the Soviet Union once again opened the Tartu Secondary School No. 1 in the original building, led by director Karl Maasik. Since the school was merged with Tartu Secondary School No. 1, the founding of the school was considered to be the year 1880. From 1950 to 1953, the director was Juhan Truus, from 1953 to 1956 the position was held by Elmar Loodus.

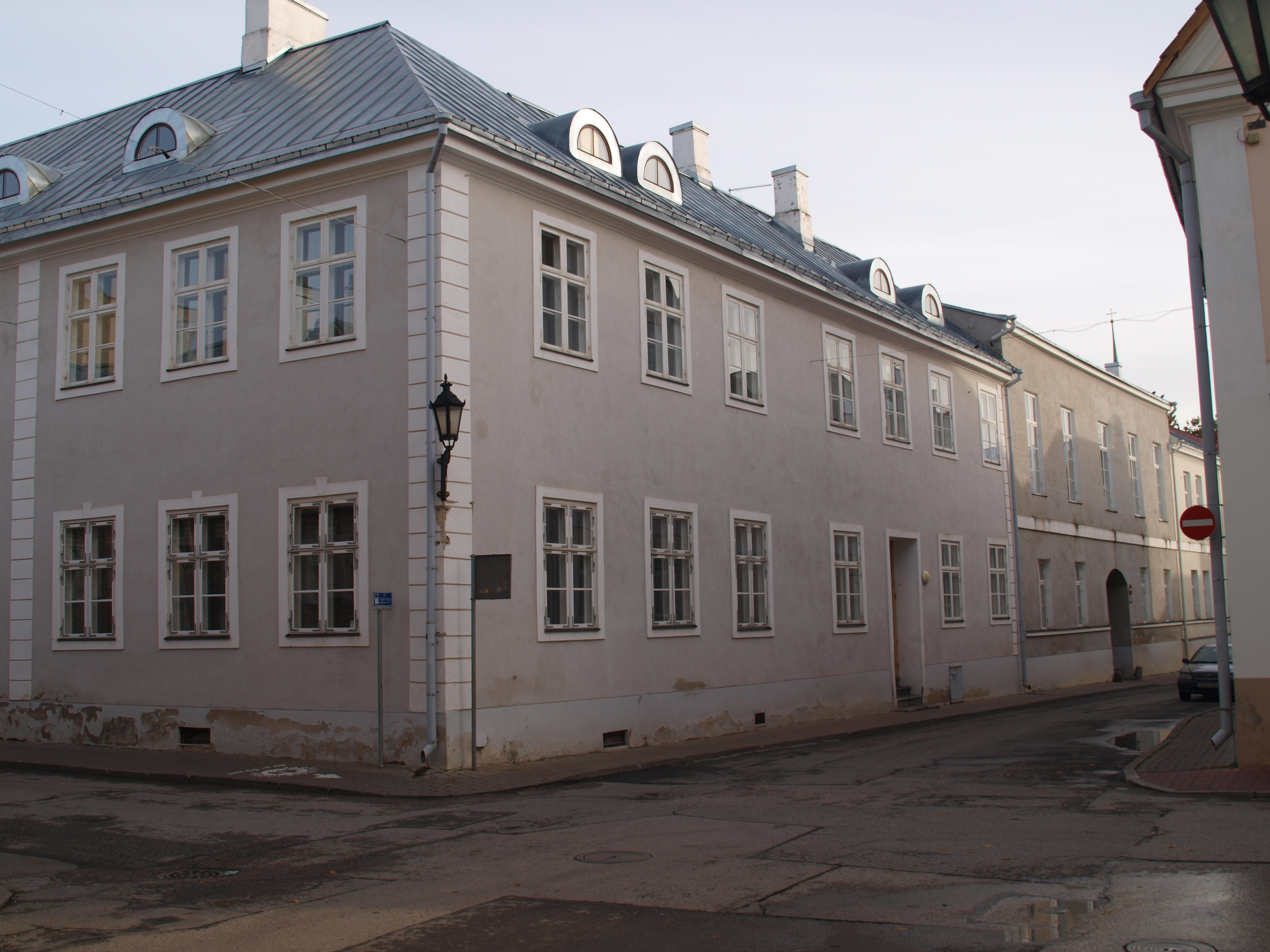
The restored southwest wing of the school

The Russification and Stalinism era from 1944 to 1954 was not well received by the student body. Underground resistance groups such as "Blue-Black-White" (Sini-Must-Valge), named after the colours of the banned Estonian flag, were formed amongst the student body. Extracurricular activity, however, was quite active during that period. Popular were sport, music (including a jazz-orchestra), acting, art and natural sciences.

In 1954, the all-boys school became a mixed-sex establishment. In 1958, the official name of the school became A. H. Tammsaare's Tartu Secondary School No. 1. The position of school director was held by Allan Liim from 1956 to 1970, by Uno Langer from 1970 to 1975, by Laine Raudsepp from 1975 to 1987.

During the period of Khrushchev Thaw, the Tartu Secondary School No. 1 opened the first special class in mathematics in 1961. In 1964, a special class in physics was also opened. In 1969, the two were merged and the school gained a science-focused department. In 1976, the elementary school moved into a new building, the so-called "little house" ("väike maja").

From 1954 to 1990, the extracurricular activities were focused on school subjects. The literature club published the paper "Our School" ("Meie kool") and eight publications of the almanac Sulesepad ("Pen smiths") were released from 1960 to 1974, with the 9th volume released in 1989.

From 1987 to 2001, the school director was Helmar Jõgi. With the Soviet Union nearing collapse in 1990, the school was once again officially named Hugo Treffner Gymnasium. The newly restored establishment was organised into a 6-class primary school and a gymnasium with a progymnasium. In 1995, the primary school and the progymnasium were merged into a separate school and Hugo Treffner Gymnasium stopped accepting students to the 7th form. Since 1998, the school has been a gymnasium consisting only of forms 10 to 12, with the primary goal of preparing students for university.

In 1998, the school's southwest wing was greatly damaged in a fire. This solved the previous political arguments over restoring the historic schoolhouse, and a project to fully renovate the building was initiated. In 2002, the project, which amounted to 82.32 million Estonian Crowns (5.26 mil euros), was successfully finished. Since 2001, the school's director has been Ott Ojaveer.

== Curriculum ==
Hugo Treffner Gymnasium serves students in classes 10 to 12. Students enter based on an entrance exam, which is taken in the spring of each year. Students who have performed well in a national olympiad are not required to take the entrance test.

The school has three major departments: physics and maths, humanities (history, civics, philosophy, religious studies and art history), and life sciences (biology and chemistry). In addition to attending classes that address theoretical matters, students may also attend practical lessons in the subject matter. There are also elective courses and extracurricular activities, such as choir and folk dancing.

== Partnerships with schools from abroad ==
=== The Comenius project 2012/2013 ===
In October 2012, the students of Hugo Treffner Gymnasium went to Urspringen, Germany. The students stayed with host families. They took part in a variety of fun activities, which also included a little bit of work and a groupwork based project work. Then the students were shown around town and they also visited some historical buildings. During the third week of April 2013 four German students and one teacher visited Estonia within the Comenius project. The programme was roughly the same as it had been in Germany.

=== Estonia – Netherlands student exchange 2010/2011 ===
During 2010/2011, some students of HTG participated in a student exchange with Merlet College in Cuijk, the Netherlands. In October 2010 the Dutch students came to visit Tartu and in March 2011 the Estonian students went to Cuijk. Both parties spent a week in the other country, allowing them to get acquainted with the local cultures.

=== Estonia – France student exchange 2012/2013 ===
In October 2012, a student exchange program took place between the Lycée Léonard de Vinci and Hugo Treffner Gymnasium. The French students spent a week in Tartu. They were introduced to the local culture and cuisine. In March 2013, the Estonian students spent a week in France, where they were shown a piece of French people's local lives.

=== Friendship with the Uppsala Fyrisskolan in Sweden ===
Since 1992, every two years about 15 students and around 5 teachers from the Uppsala Fyrisskolan come to Estonia to compete in the Five School Competition, where the students solve various problems in maths, chemistry and physics. The Swedish students have been hosted by the Estonian students at their homes. The Estonian students usually go to Sweden, as well. There they are shown the cities of Stockholm and Uppsala and they also take part in a friendly competition, where the teams consist of a mix of students from Estonia and Sweden.

=== Friendship with the Isokyrö School in Finland ===
The friendship with the Isokyrö School is mainly based on the choir and folk dancing groups of Hugo Treffner Gymnasium. The Isokyrö School is mainly an arts school. Both schools have sent their students to visit the others. When the Estonian students went to Finland, they mainly gave concerts and showed their dancing skills. When the Finnish students came to visit Tartu, they made some art. This particular friendship was initiated around 1994 and the last visits took place in 2007.

=== Friendship with the Riga National Gymnasium in Latvia ===
The friendship with the Riga National Gymnasium started in 2007, when the trip to Isokyrö was cancelled. As the leaders of the choir and folk dancing groups were looking for a new destination, the Latvian school contacted Hugo Treffner Gymnasium with the wish to initiate a friendship. Much like the trip to Isokyrö, the representatives of Hugo Treffner Gymnasium were mainly teachers, singers and dancers. The Estonian students have been to Riga twice, but the second time in 2012, only the choir group was sent. The Latvian students have been to Tartu only once, but they plan to come and visit Hugo Treffner Gymnasium once again in 2014.

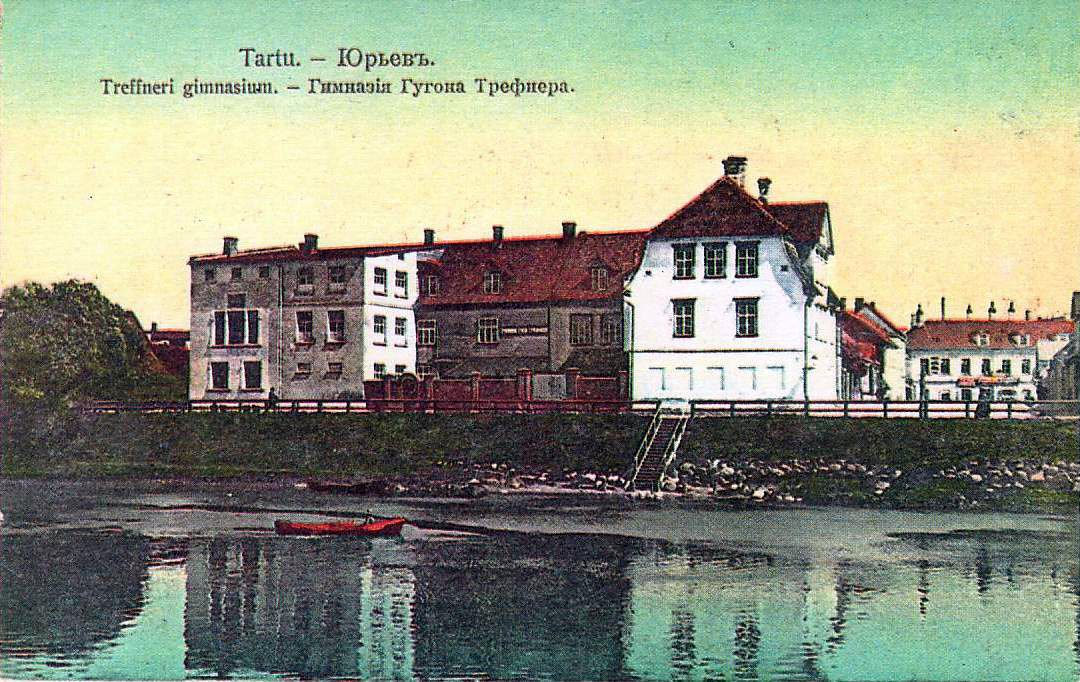
Former schoolhouse on the eastern bank of Emajõgi in 1910.

== Notable alumni ==
- Adamson-Eric (1902–1968), artist
- Artur Alliksaar (1923–1966), poet
- Paul Alvre (1921–2008), linguist
- Efraim Allsalu (1929–2006), painter
- Kaur Alttoa (born 1947), art and cultural historian
- Karl Ast (1886–1971), writer and politician
- Kaarel Eenpalu (1888–1942), politician and journalist
- Jaan Einasto (born 1929), astrophysicist
- Ernst Enno (1875–1934), poet and writer
- Ivar Grünthal (1924–1996), writer
- Edgar Hark (1908–1986), Lutheran bishop
- Jüri Jaakson (1870–1942), politician and businessman
- Mihkel Järveoja (born 1986), orienteer
- Ottniell Jürissaar (1924–2014), poet, composer, and conductor
- Ain Kaalep (born 1926), writer and poet
- Karl Kalkun (1927–1990), actor
- Jaan Kaplinski (1941–2021), writer and translator
- August Kastra (1878–1941), journalist and a trade union leader
- Paul Keerdo (1891–1950), communist politician
- Johan Kõpp (1874–1970), Lutheran bishop
- Kaimo Kuusk (born 1975), diplomat and foreign intelligence officer
- Oudekki Loone (born 1979), politician and political scientist
- Karl Luik (1883–1948), politician
- Julius Mägiste (1900–1978), linguist
- Hans Moks (1926–2011), track and field athlete
- Alo Raun (1905–2004), Estonian linguist
- Harald Riipalu (1912–1961), military commander
- Edgar V. Saks (1910–1984), historian and politician
- Juhan Simm (1885–1959), composer and conductor
- Olev Subbi (1930–2013), artist
- A. H. Tammsaare (1878–1940), writer
- Jaan Teemant (1872–1941), lawyer and politician
- Simmu Tiik (born 1959), diplomat
- Ülo Torpats (1920–1988), philologist and translator
- Friedebert Tuglas (1886–1971), writer
- Trivimi Velliste (born 1947), politician
- Paul Viiding (1904–1962), poet, author and literary critic
- Priit Volmer (born 1978), opera singer

== Sources ==
- Ülo Kaevats et al. 1996. Eesti Entsüklopeedia 9. Tallinn: Eesti Entsüklopeediakirjastus, ISBN 5-89900-047-3
