= Tiit Pääsuke =

Estonian painter

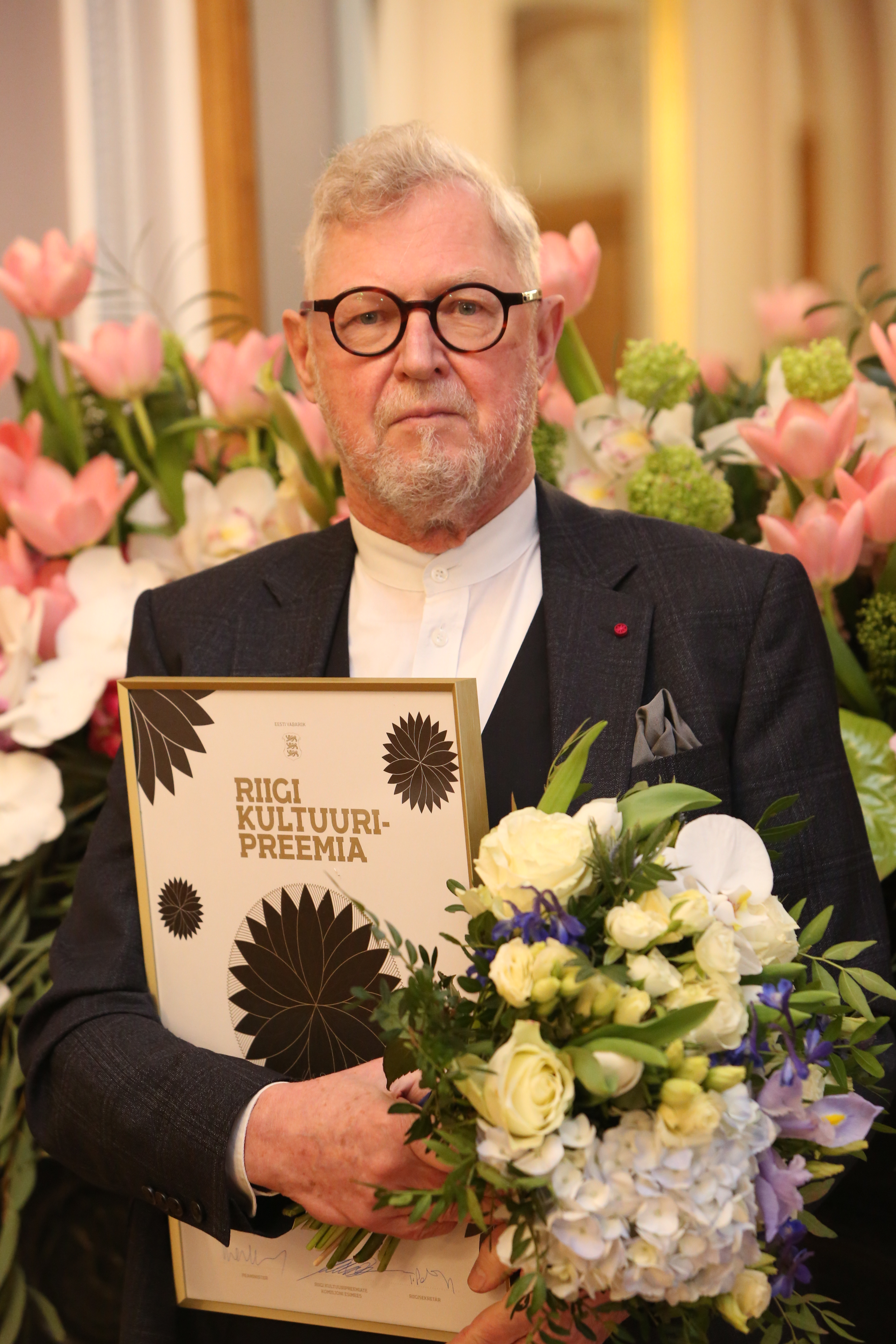
Tiit Pääsuke, 2021

Tiit Pääsuke (born 22 December 1941) is an Estonian painter.

Pääsuke was born in Põltsamaa, Põltsamaa Parish, in Jõgeva County.

== Awards ==
- 1975 Kristjan Raud Award
- 1981 Kristjan Raud Award
- 1982 Merited artist of the ESSR
- 1992 Konrad Mägi Award
- 1999 Order of the White Star, Fourth Class
- 2000 Annual Award of the Cultural Endowment of Estonia
- 2012 Estonian State Cultural Award
- 2018 Award for Life's Work from the Cultural Endowment of Estonia
- 2021 Lifetime Achievement Awards for Culture

== Gallery ==
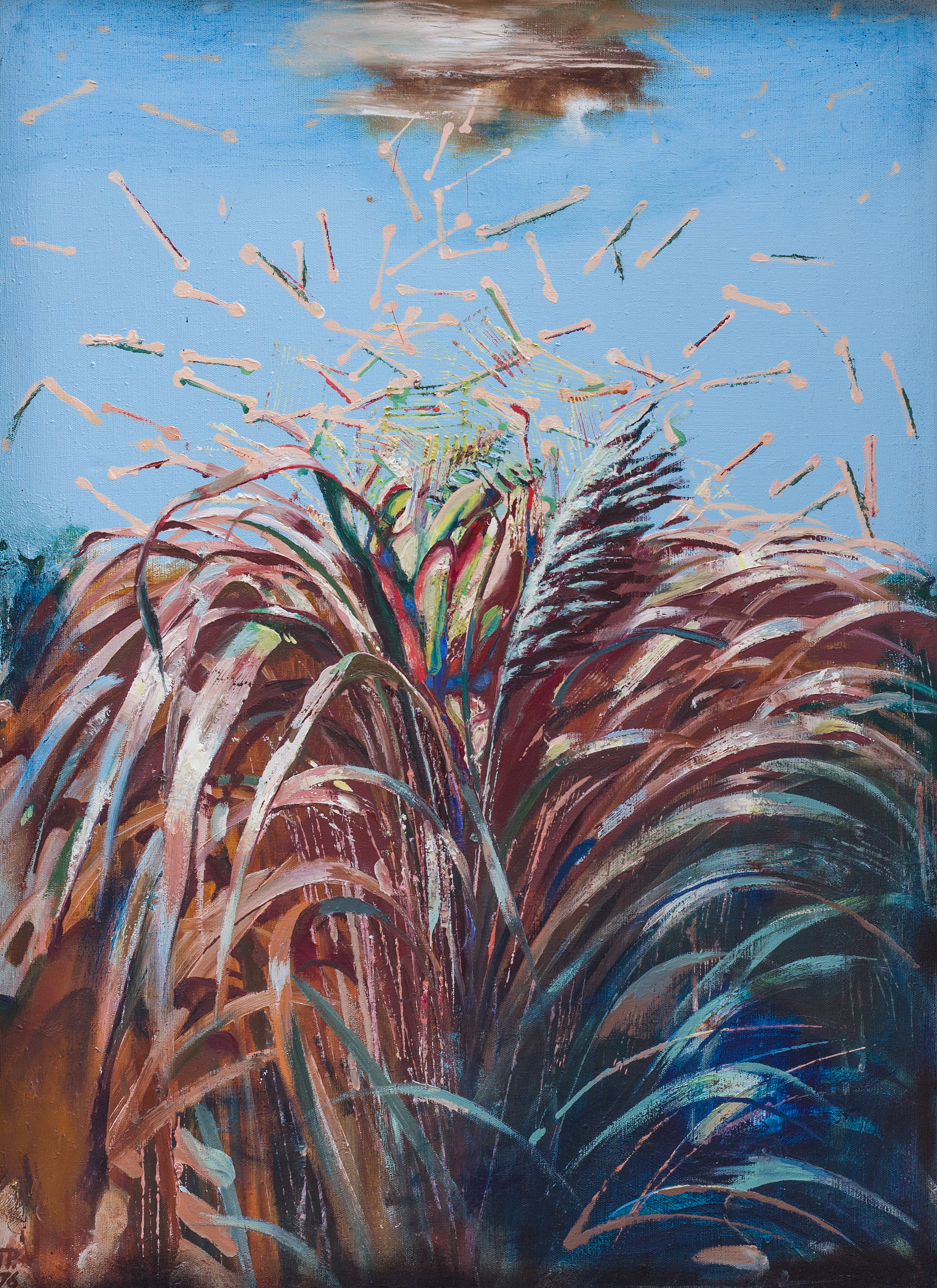
"Rohu õis" (1976)

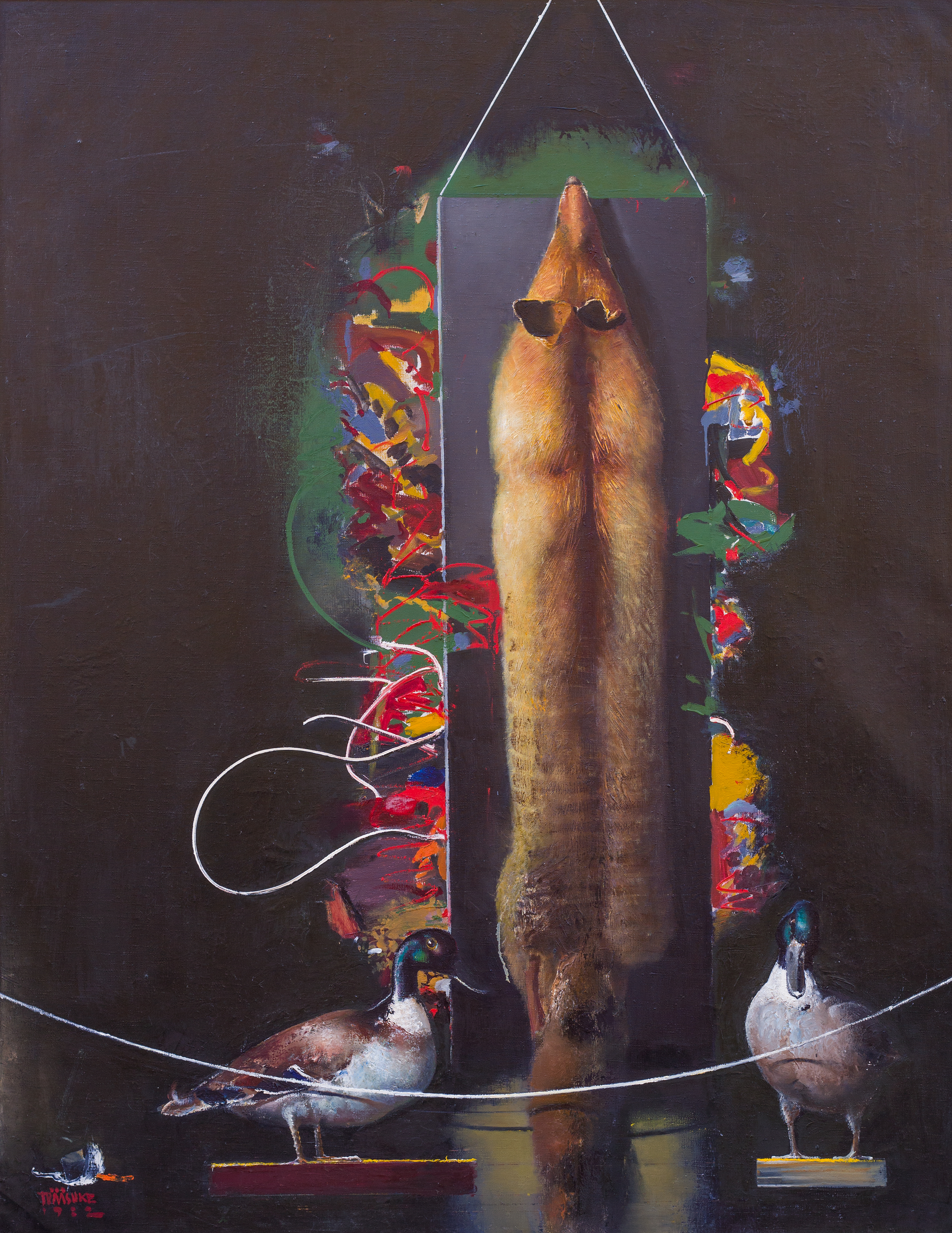
"Ekspositsioon" (1982)

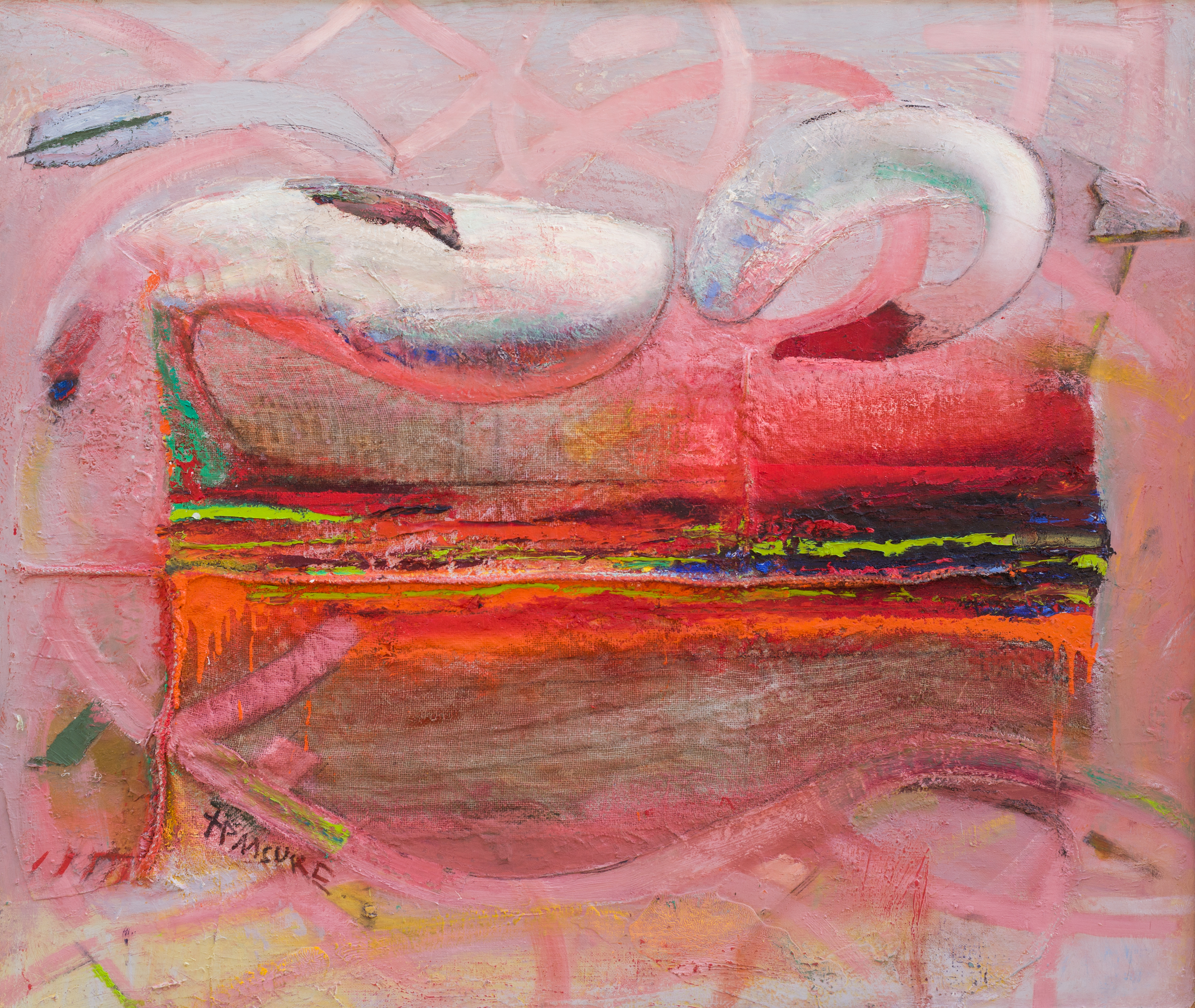
"Luigevaip" (1991)

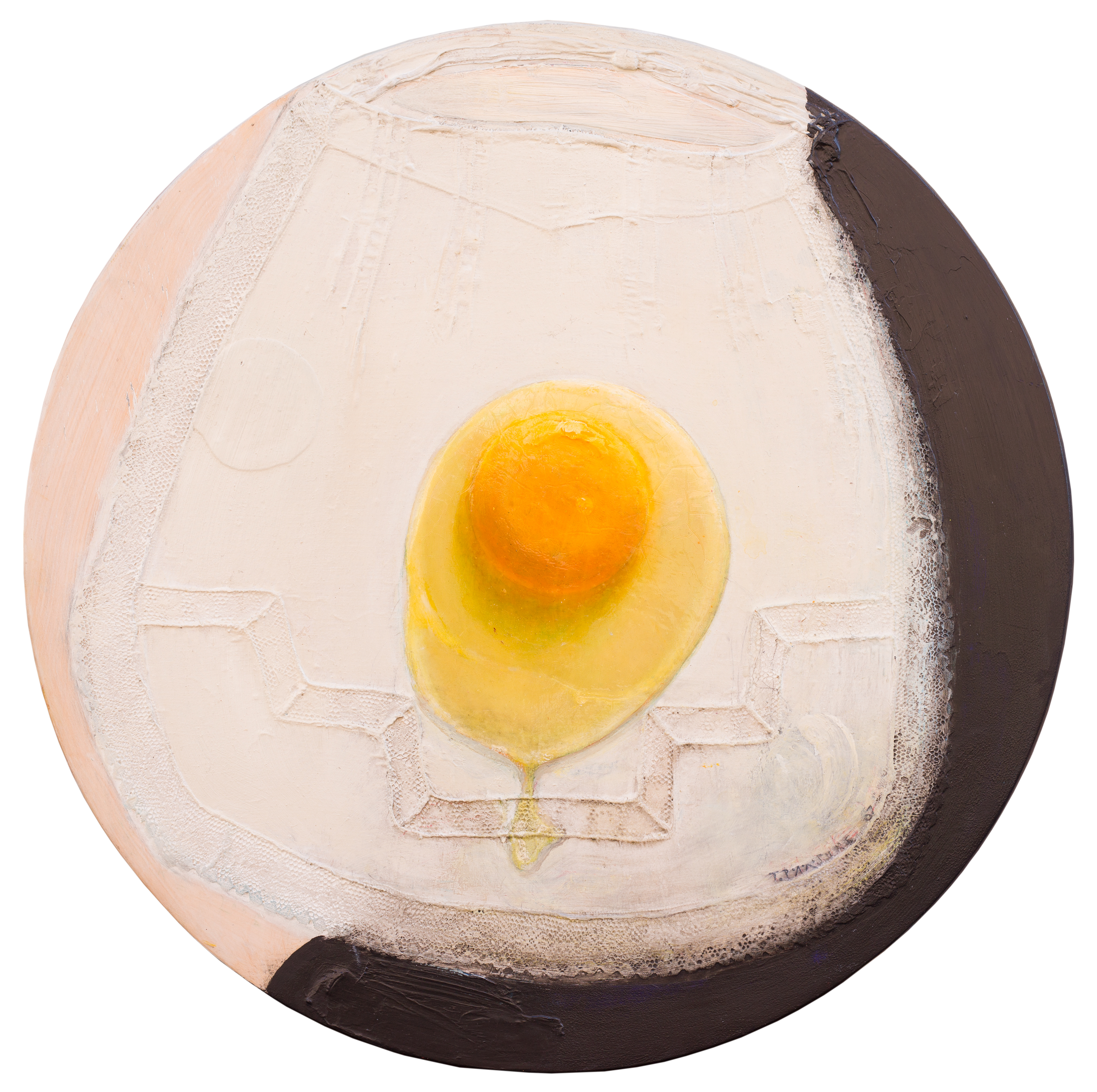
"Muna põllel" (2007)

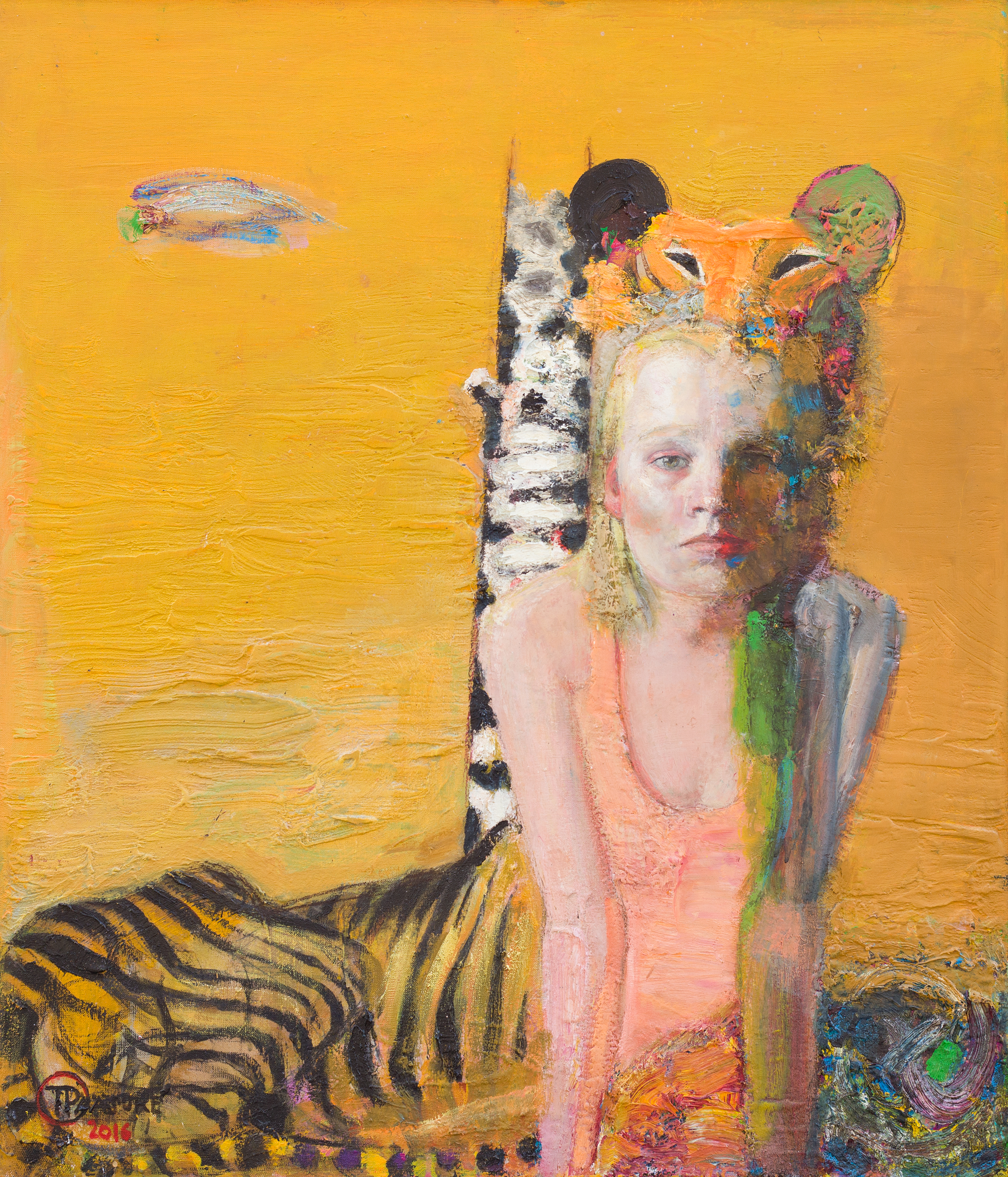
"Kris ja Kris I" (2016)

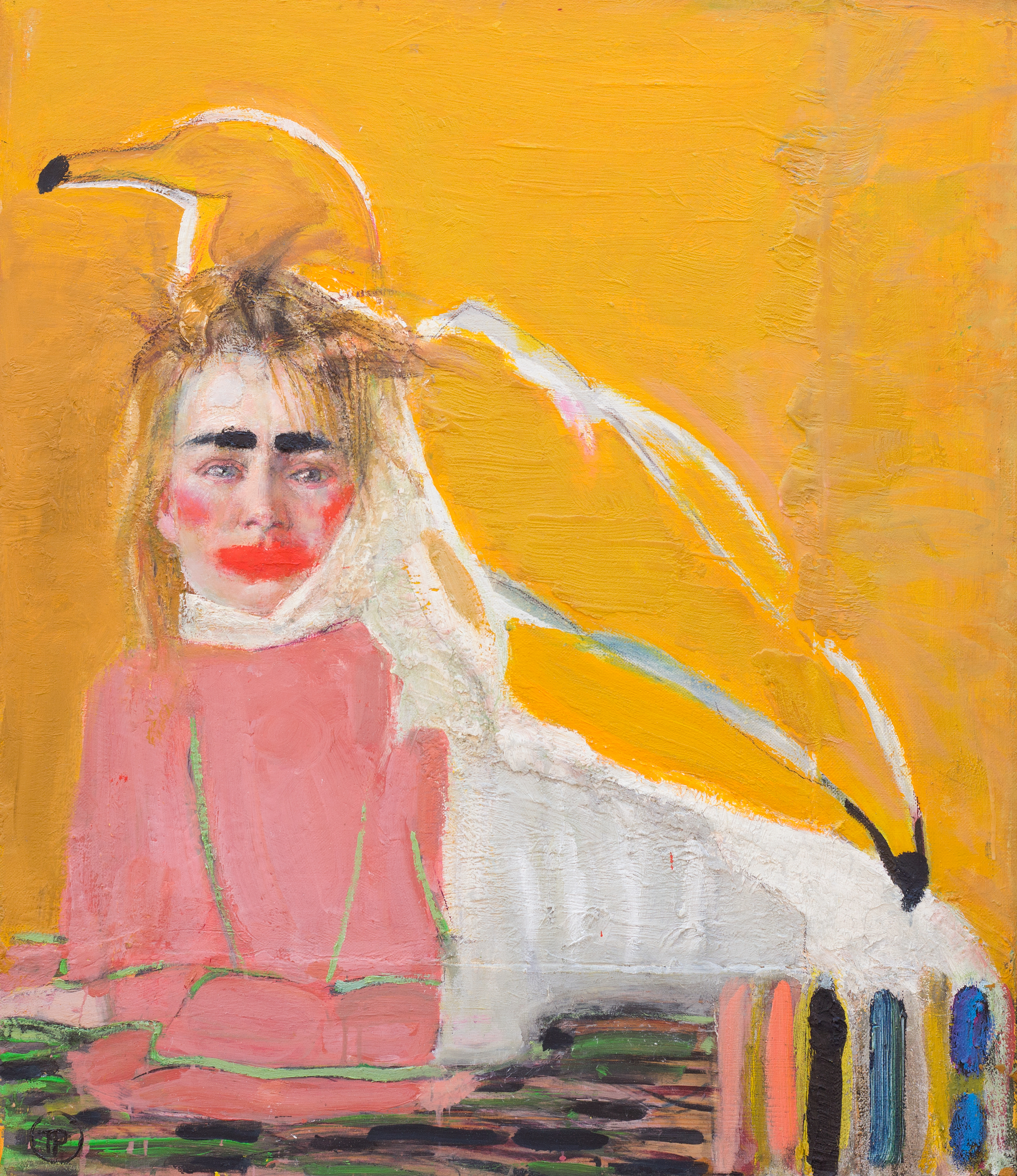
"Kris ja Kris II" (2016)
