= Priidu Beier =

Estonian poet and teacher

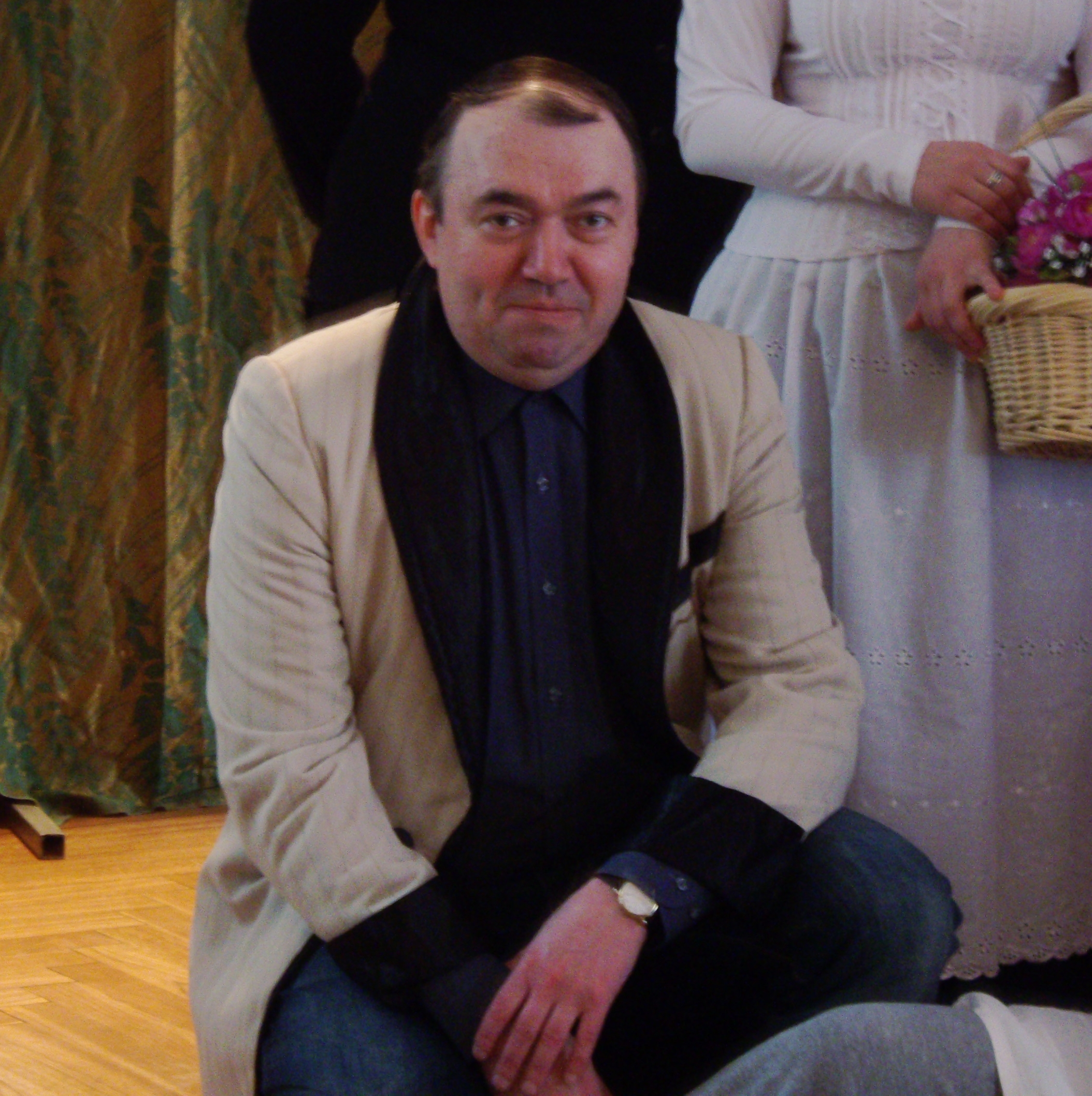
- Priidu Beier at the Hugo Treffner Gymnasium in 2011
- Born: October 16, 1957 (age 68); Tartu, Estonia
- Other names: Matti Moguči, Pierre Bezuhhov (pseudonyms)
- Occupations: Poet and teacher

Priidu Beier (pseudonyms: Matti Moguči, Pierre Bezuhhov; born 16 October 1957 in Tartu) is an Estonian poet and teacher. He has edited several publications and is also a member of the Estonian Writers' Union and Estonian Literary Society. Between 1984 and 1990 he was the Head of the Pedagogical arts sector of Tartu Art Museum. In 2007 he presented a poetry collection in Tartu with Kerti Tergem. He has taught art history at the Hugo Treffner Gymnasium in Tartu.

== Selected works ==
- Vastus (1986)
- Tulikiri (1989)
- Mustil päevil (1991)
- Femme fatale (1997)
- Maavalla keiser (2000)
- Monaco (2002)
- Saatmata kirjad (2007)
