= Ilmar Jaks =

Estonian writer (1923–2019)

Ilmar Jaks (4 April 1923 Asuküla Parish, Lääne County – 1 September 2019 Åsele Municipality, Sweden) was an Estonian writer. He is mostly known for his short stories.

From 1934 to 1941, he studied at Haapsalu Gymnasium. In 1941, he migrated to Finland, fighting in the Finnish Infantry Regiment 200. In 1945, he escaped to Sweden. In Sweden, he worked in the Swedish public office and also worked for his private law practice.

== Works ==
- 1958: short story collection Aruanne (Report)
- 1970: short story collection Mapp (Folder)
- 2003: short story collection Pimedus (Darkness)
