= Ilmar Talve =

Estonian writer and ethnologist (1919–2007)

Ilmar-Aleksander Talve
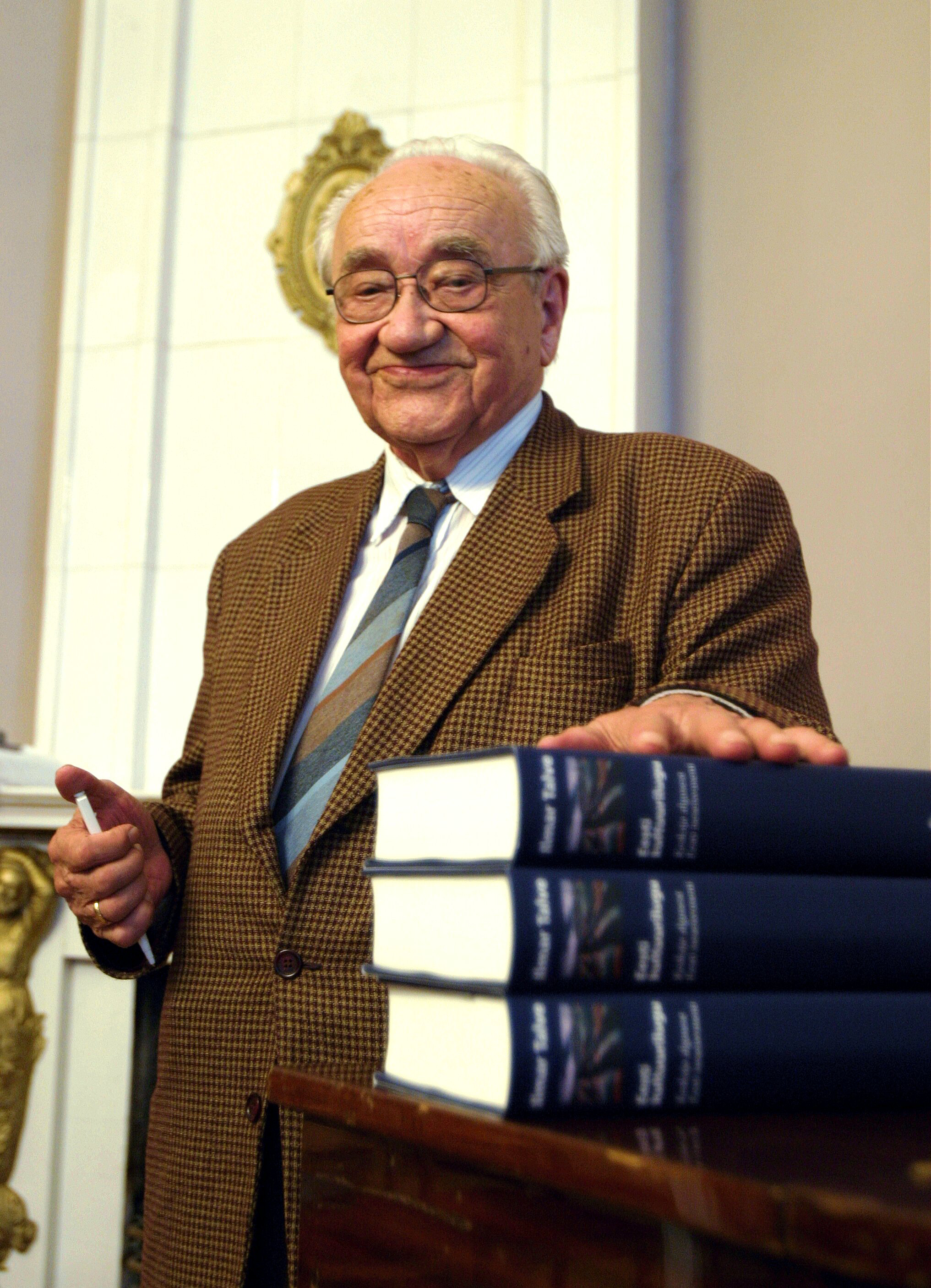
- Ilmar Talve in 2004
- Born: 1919
- Died: 2007 (aged 87–88)

Ilmar-Aleksander Talve (until 1936 Thalfeldt; 17 January 1919 Mga, Ingria – 21 April 2007 Turku) was an Estonian writer and ethnologist. He worked primarily in Sweden and Finland.

In 1943, he fled to Finland, and there he joined Finnish Infantry Regiment 200.

In 1946, he became a member of the literary group Tuulisui.

In 1959, he started teaching at the University of Turku, and in 1986 he became a professor emeritus.

== Works ==
- short story "Ainult inimene". Vadstena: Orto, 1948
- novel "Maja lumes. Lund: Eesti Kirjanike Kooperatiiv, 1952.
- novel "Juhansoni reisid. Lund: Eesti Kirjanike Kooperatiiv, 1959
- novel "Maapagu. I-II. Lund: Eesti Kirjanike Kooperatiiv, 1988
- monograph "Eesti kultuurilugu: Keskaja algusest Eesti iseseisvuseni". Tartu: Ilmamaa, 2004
