= Ottniell Jürissaar =

Estonian poet and musician

Ottniel Jürissaar
- Born: 27 March 1924; Tartu, Estonia
- Died: 7 September 2014 (aged 90)
- Resting place: Metsakalmistu, Tallinn
- Occupations: Composer, conductor, poet

Ottniell Jürissaar (27 March 1924 – 7 September 2014) was an Estonian poet, composer, and conductor.

== Early life and education ==
Ottniell Jürissaar was born in Tartu. His father, Johannes Jürissaar, was an inventor and small-scale industrialist. His mother Silvi (née Juhainen) was Finnish.

He attended primary school in Elva, graduating in 1938. In 1943, he graduated from Hugo Treffner Gymnasium. He briefly studied singing at the Tallinn Conservatory under instruction of Ott Raukas and was a candidate for the composition class of Heino Eller before World War II interrupted his studies.

== Career and imprisonment ==
In 1943, Jürissaar, along with some forty classmates volunteered as soldiers of the Finnish Infantry Regiment 200. After the war, he became part of the Forest Brothers anti-Soviet partisan group. He was captured and sentenced to five to ten years forced labor at a prison camp in Mordovia. He was released in 1954. Ottniell Jürissaar wrote about 300 songs and instrumental pieces during his imprisonment and exile, including two operettas.

From 1960 to 1971, Jürissaar worked as a teacher in Russian schools in Kohtla-Järve. He conducted the mixed choir 'Heli' and the female choir 'Kaja'. Jürissaar then moved From Kohtla-Järve to Tallinn. In the early 1990s, he led the Memento Tallinn Association ensemble 'Memento'. Jürissaar wrote a number of poetry collections and memoirs, including about the Forest Brother period and his experiences in the prison camps. His stories and poetry have also been translated into Finnish and English. He has also written several children's books.

== Personal life and death ==
Ottniell Jürissaar was a member of the Estonian Reform Party from 2013 until his death in 2014. He was buried at Tallinn's Forest Cemetery.

== Awards ==
- Order of the White Star, Medal Class (2000)

== Books ==
- Alleaa-Kallermaa, published 1990, Illustrated by Asta Vender
- Kaduviku sillal: kirjutatud metsas, vanglas, laagris (On the Bridge of Disappearance: Written in the Forest, Prison, and Camp), published 1990, compiled and edited by Urve Hermann, designed by A. Ilo
- Kevadetüdrukud (Spring Girls), published 1993, design and illustrations by Aarne Mesikäpp
- Rännulugusid ja vemmalvärsse (Travel Stories and Doggerel Verses), published 1991, designed by Aarne Mesikäpp
- Sada sonetti (One Hundred Sonnets), published 1992, designs and illustrations by Aarne Mesikäpp
- Suupillilugu (A Harmonica Story), published 2000, illustrations by Heli Kase

== Selected sheet music ==
- Laule trellide ja okastraadi tagant (Songs Behind Bars and Barbed Wire), 1989
- Metsavennalaulud (Forest Brotherhood Songs), 1990
- Noorusmälestusi Soomest: 20 akordionipala (Youth Memories of Finland: 20 Accordion Pieces), 1991
