= Ivar Grünthal =

Estonian writer (1924–1996)

Ivar Grünthal (8 April 1924 – 14 February 1996) was an Estonian writer.

== Biography ==
His parents were lawyers Vera Poska-Grünthal and Timotheus Grünthal. His grandfather was statesman Jaan Poska.

From 1932 to 1941 he studied at Hugo Treffner Gymnasium in Tartu. In 1942 he started his schooling at University of Tartu (studying medicine), but in 1943 he was transferred to Helsinki University. In 1944 he joined the Finnish Infantry Regiment 200. After the war he lived in Sweden.

He was the founder and chief editor (1957–1965) of the magazine Mana. He was a member of Estonian Writers' Union Abroad, and Estonian PEN Club.

He was the acting minister of social affairs of the Estonian government-in-exile.

== Selected works ==
- 1954: poetry collection Must pühapäev ('Black Sunday')
- 1960: poetry collection Lumi ja lubi ('Snow and Lime')
- 1962: verse novel Peetri kiriku kellad ('The Bells of St. Peter's Church')
