= Estonian State Cultural Awards =

Estonian awards

Estonian State Cultural Awards (Estonian: Eesti Vabariigi kultuuripreemiad) are Estonian state cultural awards which are designated for outstanding creative achievements in the field of culture. Awards are given to persons.

Every year, the awards are designated to:

- "three awards for long-term outstanding creative activity";
- "five awards for outstanding works that have reached the public in the preceding calendar year".

The amount of the awards are determined in the state budget.

The awards are handed over on the anniversary of Republic of Estonia (24 February).
