= Pohjan Pojat =

Finnish military unit

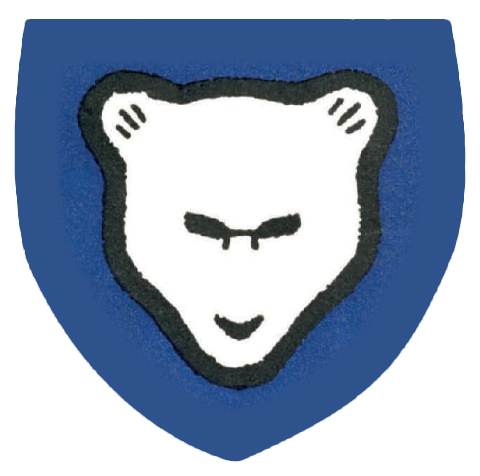
- Active: 1918–1919
- Country: Finland
- Allegiance: Estonia
- Type: Land forces
- Size: 2213
- Mottos: Hakkaa päälle, pohjan poika!

Commanders
- Commander: Hans Kalm

Pohjan Pojat (Estonian: Põhja Pojad; Finnish: Pohjan Pojat pronounced [ˈpo̞hjɑmˌpo̞jɑt̪]; transl. Sons of the North) was a Finnish military brigade in 1918–1919, the second group of Finnish volunteers to enlist to take part in the Estonian War of Independence and sometimes the Latvian War of Independence, closely following behind the 1st Finnish Volunteer Corps (I Suomalainen Vapaajoukko) regiment led by Colonel Martin Ekström.

Pohjan Pojat fought under the command of Estonian Lieutenant Colonel Hans Kalm on the southern front in Estonia. Pohjan Pojat was the only Finnish military unit that progressed outside the Estonian national borders in the Estonian War of Independence.

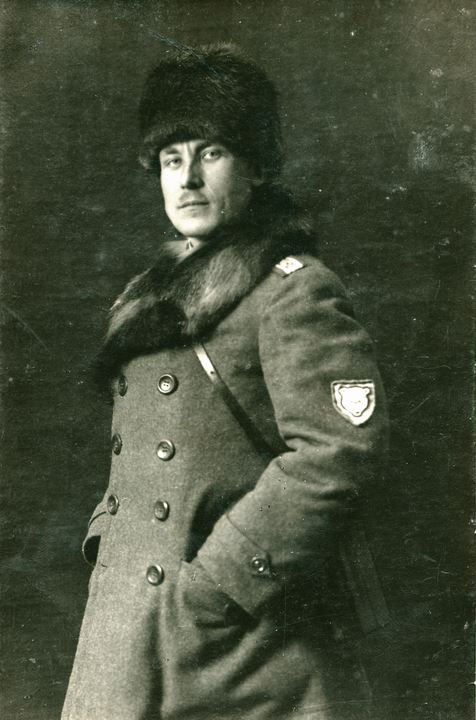
Hans Kalm in 1919

== Establishment ==
As soon as the Finnish Commission for helping Estonia had decided on the formation of volunteer forces, Hans Kalm started recruiting volunteers. He published direct and emotional recruitment announcements in newspapers on December 23, 1918, in which he appealed to his comrades-in-arms during the Finnish Civil War. The announcements called on Finns to fight for humanity, justice, the freedom of the homeland and the fraternal people.

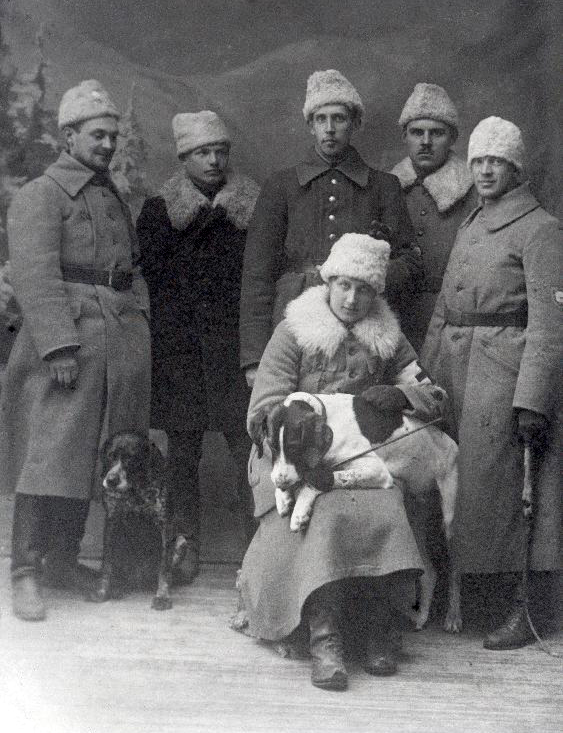
Soldiers from the Pohjan Pojat's artillery division and an army nurse

The Finnish Commission for helping Estonia had decided that no more than a thousand men should be sent to Estonia. However, as an Estonian, Kalm did not care about this and gathered 2213 men and 400 officials for the campaign. He formed a brigade that consisted of two infantry battalions and three artillery batteries supported by communication, cavalry and skiing departments. The force got its name from the slogan of the Hakkapeliittas: ”Hakkaa päälle, pohjan poika!” ("strike upon [them], son of the north!"). The regiment's flag had a picture of a polar bear, and the colours were based on a Finnish state flag.

The regiment's flag was the polar bear's head flag, which was based on the Finnish national flag with a tongue. Lieutenant Colonel Kalm gave his first order of the day to his troops on 7 January 1919.

Exceptionally, the officers of the Pohjan Pojat consisted of Jaegers, unlike in the I Finnish Free Corps. There were a total of 80 Finnish jaegers in Estonia, and most of them were in the Pohjan Pojat. In addition, those who left for Estonia were automatically promoted. Jaeger Lieutenant Erkki Hannula was appointed as the commander of the first battalion of the Boys of the North. Jaeger Captain Gustav Svinhufvud was chosen as the leader of the second battalion. Elja Rihtniemi, who distinguished himself as the commander of the Kajaani guerrilla regiment, was appointed Chief of Staff and Captain of the Pohjan Pojat Regiment.

== Battles ==
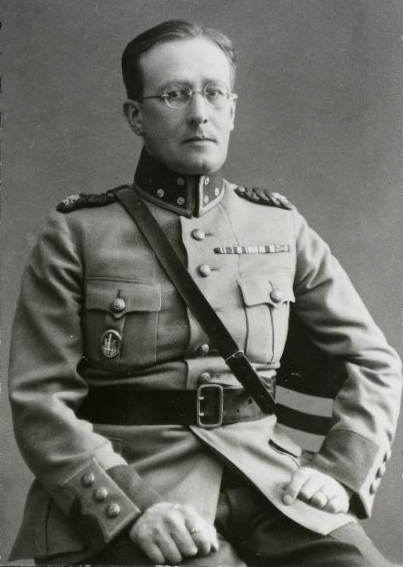
Captain Erkki Hannula, commander of Pohjan Pojat's regiment 1

=== Battle of Paju Manor ===
The first operation of the Sons of the North was aimed at capturing Valkki on the Estonian-Latvian border together with the Kuperjanov Battalion led by the Estonian Julius Kuperjanov, the Tartu Defence Battalion equipped with two cannons and four armoured trains. The city was a militarily important transport hub, connecting railways from five directions. On the way to Valki, there was a Paju (Luhde Großhof) manor, which was defended by a premier detachment of 500–600 men and 20 machine guns, known as Lenin's Janissaries, and a Latvian sniper battalion.

On 31 January, the temperature was ten degrees below zero and light snow covered the ground. The first attack was attempted by Kuperjanov's battalion in broad daylight, but it was repelled. In addition to 13 killed and 42 wounded Estonians, Kuperjanov, who led the troops, was mortally wounded. He passed away a few days later. After the Estonians' unsuccessful attack, the Pohjan Pojat started their own attempt led by Erkki Hannula. The attack started from two directions led to a confusing situation where it was impossible to distinguish between one's own and the enemy, and the advance stopped. As the evening darkened, Hannula began to attack again with the help of his last reserve, and the manor was finally captured at half past five in a melee battle with bayonets, rifle butts and knives. The first battalion of Hannula, which was responsible for the battles of the sons of the North, suffered heavy losses, losing one officer, two non-commissioned officers and 21 soldiers, and 39 were wounded. About 100 Latvians were killed, there were no prisoners of war, because the Finns were not allowed to take prisoners according to the order, but executed everyone they caught. There were also a few Chinese mercenaries. The Finns also accidentally executed 12 workers of the manor who had been hiding in the basement of the manor during the battle.

==== The capture of Valkki and the Battle of Koikylä ====
The Pohjan Pojat took over Valkki on 1 February without resistance. As a result of the terror practiced by the Reds, dozens of murdered and tortured townspeople were found in the mass graves in the city. The Estonians took responsibility for the front in the area and the Pohjan Pojat remained in reserve. Major General Wetzer arrived in Valki on 10 February and announced that he would keep the Pohjan Pojat in reserve. This did not suit Kalm, who demanded a task that would "better suit the spirit of the regiment". Wetzer ended up ordering the first battalion of the Sons of the North to fight around Koikylä (Koikküla) until the railway in the Marienburg area was cut off and the advance would be more secure. The regiment's headquarters and the second battalion remained in Valki as reserves. Jaeger Lieutenant Erkki Hannula sent Einar Marttinen's company to capture Koikylä, where they were met by the same Latvian sniper battalion as at Paju Manor. The encircled executed attack was a complete success, and the enemy fled so far that combat contact with it was lost. After this, the troops were left to wait for a new mission.

==== Advance to northern Latvia and the Battle of Marienburg ====
On 16 February, Kalm telegraphed Wetter that he was tired of waiting while the Estonians were fighting. Wetzer told Kalm to stay put, but he no longer obeyed. Kalm stubbornly gave the order on 16 February 1919 to attack Marienburg (Alūksne) in northern Latvia. However, the troops did not accept an attack outside Estonia's borders. In the opinion of the volunteers, the commitment made in connection with the recruitment could not oblige them to participate in the attack. Kalm explained the attack to the troops by defending the Estonian territory more effectively by acquiring better positions. Material reasons also weighed heavily. The troops were already wearing worn and bad footwear, and in addition to footwear, there was a shortage of clothes, weapons, saddles, field telephones and railway wagons. In his operational order on 18 February, Kalm wrote that the enemy had collected goods they had looted from many directions in Marienburg and promised to return the regiment back to Valki by rail after the attack.

An attack on the Marienburg borough with almost the entire regiment without the consent of the commander and with almost unprotected sites was a risky operation. Kalm also had no information about the enemy's strengths or even the positions of the Estonians. Latvia was also an enemy country and the inhabitants would hardly help the Finns voluntarily. The departure date came on 19 February. However, the first company led by Väinö Havas refused to participate in the operation, citing the commitments of volunteers, they were not obliged to conquer foreign countries. The company stayed behind to protect the regiment's rear.

During the first two days, the boys of Pohja did not encounter organized resistance. The scouts who moved in front of the troops encountered only small enemy patrols that gave way to the troops. The strong wind was crisp and it was snowing from the sky, sometimes sleet. Poor equipment and lice bothered the group. After an 80-kilometre journey, the main group of the Boys of the North arrived near Marienburg in the evening of 20 February. According to the original attack plan, the Estonian troops supported by armoured trains would have attacked the borough from the north and northwest at the same time as the Boys of the North from the south. However, the enemy had destroyed the railway bridges and the Estonians had not yet arrived. However, Kalm did not want to wait for additional troops so that the enemy would not have time to organize itself into a strong defense.

The attack was launched with the support of the artillery battery that accompanied the Boys of the North in the morning fog on 21 February. The enemy, numbering about a thousand men, was stationed in front of the Marienburg railway station with several machine guns. The solution was reached after a three-hour battle at about ten o'clock, when the sixth company, led by Jaeger Lieutenant Sainio, hooked the enemy from the rear from the west side of the town. This caused the Bolsheviks to detach themselves from their positions and try to escape. However, the attack claimed heavy losses. In it, 40 Pohjan Poikas were killed, including Jaeger Lieutenant Einar Marttinen and Jaeger Second Lieutenant Ragnar Oivo. The enemy's losses amounted to about 300 men. The operation as a whole was also demanding. As many as 200 Pohjan Poikas fell ill due to inadequate equipment and footwear. After the battle, the commands began to collect the spoils of war that were smaller than expected. The catch was limited to four machine guns, rifles, horses, carts, two field kitchens, horse fodder and a large wool store. Individual Pohjan Pojat (Sons of the North) searched the homes of Jewish merchants in particular, robbing property. The looting divided the opinions of the masses, and especially the most idealistic young people were ashamed of it. Later, the looting was also criticized by the Main Committee for Estonian Assistance.

From the point of view of Wetzer's headquarters, the missing regiment of the Boys of the North was completely isolated from the Estonian troops. However, the Estonian armoured trains arrived on 22 February after a day of waiting, and the Tallinn Civil Protection Battalion took over the positions of the Finnish Free Forces. At the same time, Kalm received a congratulatory telegram from Wetzer, in which he warned Kalm not to move forward any further. The unadorned parade of the occupation of Marienburg was held on 24 February, after which the regiment prepared to leave the city. The regiment moved back to Valki on 26 February 1919.

==== After Marienburg ====
In the opinion of many, the heavy battles of the Boys of the North were wasted when the Estonian troops retreated from Marienburg only a week after the departure of the Finns. Only a few Estonians were wounded in the skirmishes in the city before retreating, while the Boys of the North had suffered heavy losses from its conquest. Kalm blamed General Wetter for what had happened. Wetzer's position as commander was at stake in other ways as well. Estonians felt that Wetzer's position was patronage, and the Swedish-speaking general's good relations with the Baltic barons and his allegedly broad life aroused suspicion. Wetzer was eventually forced to return to Finland. Due to the easy loss of Marienburg, the morale of the Free Forces had declined and the troops felt that they were being used to make up for the losses of the Estonians, and the battle began to be considered futile.

Many volunteers, including Jaeger Captain Hannula, vented their frustration by drinking. Many of the stories told about the Sons of the North are related to liquor, even though they didn't drink at the front, but they did when they were free. Among other things, it has been said that Erkki Hannula's men shot the initials EH with a machine gun into the plastered wall of a Valki resident. When Hannula, who was in a festive mood herself, was invited to see a work of art dedicated to her, she said that the work was otherwise good, but the point was missing. After this, a cannon was dragged to the scene to make the point.

Relations between Estonians and Finns also began to crack. The most serious incident that caused bad blood was the beating and execution of 16-year-old private Viljo Juutilainen shortly before the troops were demobilised. The lyceum student from Kouvola was not known to have been guilty of anything. Juutilainen, who was walking unarmed and sober, had only been picked up from the street. The case was considered incomprehensible, especially because there was no desire to investigate the case and the shooter was not convicted. This infuriated Kalmi, and by the end of the expedition, relations between the Finns and the locals had become inflamed. In addition, the Estonian government had not paid the wages it had promised.

In early March 1919, the regiment's headquarters received several resignations from officers, non-commissioned officers and crew. The volunteers' commitments were considered fulfilled when the territory of Estonia had been liberated from enemies. The regiment's team spirit began to crack and the exercises were considered pointless, because soon they were returning to Finland anyway. At the same time, the Red Army had launched an offensive in southeastern Estonia. The town of Petseri had been lost to the enemy on 11 March and the town of Võru was threatened. Kalm ordered the Pohjan Pojat from Finland to repel the attack. There was a general reluctance among the troops to go to the front, but the commanders' appeals to the men's sense of honour and duty helped. The front season in Petseri lasted from mid-March to the end of the month. The area had originally been inhabited by Setos people of Finnish descent, but later became the target of strong Russification. For this reason, Finns sometimes felt that they were fighting in Russia rather than in Estonia. The Sons of the North did not achieve any major breakthroughs, partly due to the regiment's combat strength being halved due to losses, holidays and liberations. The fighting was mainly in the nature of an abrasive trench warfare, and the small villages and manors in the area changed hands several times during the battles. Fatigue, strain, hunger, cold and lack of reserves eroded the will to fight of the troops. In the end, a group of the Sons of the North left their posts after getting tired of waiting for the Estonians, who did not meet the agreed deadline. The regiment returned to Valki in its entirety on 29 March. The battles of the Son of the North during their last responsibility at the front cost 27 killed, eight missing and almost 100 wounded.

== Disbandment ==
Kalm, who had returned from Finland, offered the Pohjan Pojat a new offer of commitment to the occupation of Ingria after the battles of Pechory. Kalm planned an attack on Ingria by Ingrians, Estonians, the Sons of the North and other Finns in order to help the Finnish population in the area and to occupy St. Petersburg. The project would have been carried out from Estonia, the Karelian Isthmus and Olonets. However, the majority wanted to go back home and did not sign a new contract.

Most of the Pohjan Pojat were repatriated back to Finland at the beginning of April 1919. The atmosphere at the departure home was tense due to the drunken rampage of the Finns and the murder of a 16-year-old Finnish soldier in Valkki. 200 Sons of the North remained in Estonia as a backbone for the Ingrian volunteer army that Kalm had hoped for. At the turn of April and May, the unit still participated in the battles on the Mustjoki front, suffering three casualties.

When Kalm, the commander of the Sons of the North, was unable to gather men for the Ingrian expedition and the Main Committee for Estonian Assistance terminated relations with him, Kalm issued an order to disband the regiment on 29 May 1919. After the disbandment, some of the Sons of the North remained to serve in the Ingrian Free Forces and some in the Estonian army. The total losses of the reinforced regiment of the Pohjan Pojat were 116 men, or about four percent of the total. The loss percentage of the Pohjan Pojat was twice as high as that of the I Finnish Free Corps.
