= Hans Kalm =

Finnish soldier

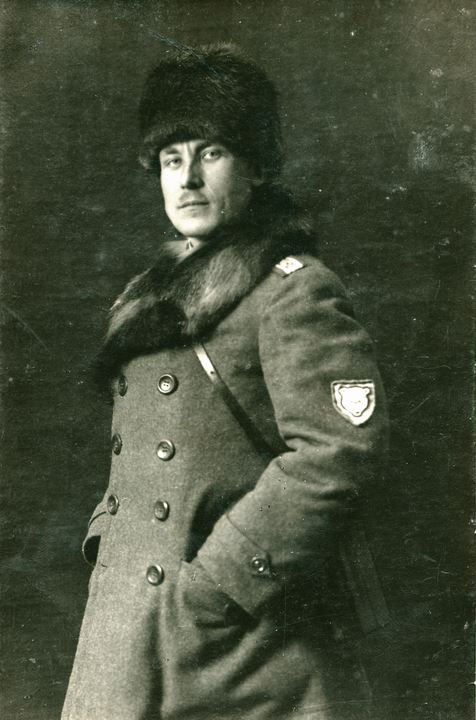
- Born: 21 April 1889; Kotsama, Kreis Fellin, Governorate of Livonia
- Died: 1 February 1981 (aged 91); Jyväskylä, Finland
- Military career
- Allegiance: Russian Empire; White Finland; Estonia; Finland
- Branch: Imperial Russian Army; White Guard; Pohjan Pojat; Finnish Army
- Service years: 1914–1941
- Rank: Colonel (Finland and Estonia)
- Conflicts: World War I; Finnish Civil War; Estonian War of Independence; World War II; Continuation War

Hans Kalm (21 April 1889 – 1 February 1981) was an Estonian soldier who served in the armies of Russian Empire, Finland and Estonia. He was also a homeopath and naturopath who took an interest in alternative medicine.

== World War I and Finnish Civil War ==
Kalm was born to a farmer's family in the village of Kotsama in Kõo Parish (now Põhja-Sakala Parish in Estonia) in the Kreis Fellin of the Governorate of Livonia. His last name is connected with the old Finno-Ugric word kalma, meaning 'death'. According to a family legend, one of Kalm's forefathers survived the Black Death by hiding in a remote cemetery island and therefore changed his name. Kalm was recruited by the Imperial Russian Army in 1914 and fought in the First World War in the Gulf of Riga. After the 1917 Russian Revolution he fled to Finland and joined the White Guards. In the 1918 Finnish Civil War he led a battalion mostly composed of the students of two park ranger colleges from Ähtäri and Evo.

Kalm's battalion became infamous in March as they attacked a Red Guard sanatorium in the village of Harmoinen in Kuhmoinen municipality, killing 11 wounded soldiers and two nurses. After the Battle of Lahti, his battalion was in charge of the Hennala camp. In a short period in May, more than 500 Red prisoners were executed, including some 200 female fighters. The youngest of the latter ones were only 14-year-old. It is most likely that Kalm himself shot the Red leader Ali Aaltonen.

== War in Estonia ==
Kalm resigned from the White Army in July 1918 and left for Estonia, where he became the commander of the Pohjan Pojat regiment fighting in the Estonian War of Independence. It was a unit composed of Finnish volunteers. Pohjan Pojat was disbanded in May 1919 and Kalm returned to Finland. From 1923 to 1933 he lived in the United States studying medicine and working as a doctor in New Jersey and New York. He was granted United States citizenship in 1930. Kalm returned to Finland again in 1934 and settled in Rauma in Western Finland. He was interested in alternative medicine like naturopathy, orthopathy, and homeopathy and even ran a spa.

== World War II and post-war years ==
As Finland joined the Second World War, Kalm was briefly the commander of a POW camp in Pieksämäki. He was released in October 1941 and sent to Germany to study military health issues for the Finnish Army. During the war, Kalm was also active in the Finnish Nazi organization Finnish National Socialist Labor Organisation (KTJ). To avoid being arrested for his misconduct at the Pieksämäki prison camp, Kalm fled to the United States via Sweden in 1946. Kalm worked as a physician in Aiken County, South Carolina and later studied surgery in Mexico.

In 1957 Kalm returned to Finland to practice homeopathic medicine. His doctor's license was finally cancelled in 1974 as Finnish authorities found out that Mid-West Medical College, where Kalm had graduated in 1933, was not approved by the American Medical Association. Hans Kalm spent his last years with his son's family in Jyväskylä and died in 1981.

== Selected publications ==
- Organotropia as a Basis of Therapy (1969)
