= List of Estonian women writers =

This is a list of women writers who were born in Estonia or whose writings are closely associated with that country.

== A ==
- Kai Aareleid (born 1972), prose writer, poet, translator
- Margit Adorf (born 1974), journalist, poet
- Eda Ahi (born 1990), poet, translator
- Silvia Airik-Priuhka (1926–2014), writer, translator
- Ave Alavainu (1942–2022), poet
- Betti Alver (1906–1989), poet, novelist, translator
- Epp Annus (born 1969), writer and literary scholar
- Elisabeth Aspe (1860–1927), novelist and short story writer
- Elise Aun (1863–1932), poet

== B ==
- Aimée Beekman (born 1933), writer, novelist
- Maimu Berg (born 1945), writer, critic, translator, journalist
- Piret Bristol (born 1968), poet, prosaist, novelist

== D ==
- Helmi Dresen (1892–1941), translator, poet, Esperantist
- Hilda Dresen (1896–1981), translator, poet, Esperantist

== E ==
- Kristiina Ehin (born 1977), poet, translator, singer, songwriter
- Salme Ekbaum (1912–1995), writer, poet
- Alide Ertel (1877–1955), prose writer, playwright

== H ==
- Anna Haava (1864–1957), poet, translator, writer
- Lehte Hainsalu (born 1938), poet, novelist, children's author
- Aime Hansen (born 1962), poet, writer, artist
- Viiu Härm (born 1944), poet, novelist, children's writer
- Marie Heiberg (1890–1942), poet, short story writer
- Kärt Hellerma (born 1956), journalist, editor, poet, short story writer, children's writer, literary critic
- Kadri Hinrikus (born 1970), children's writer, journalist
- Laine Hone (1926–2005), translator, philologist

== J ==
- Merle Jääger (born 1965), poet, novelist, actress
- Piret Jaaks (born 1980), dramatist, playwright, poet, journalist, children's writer
- Helvi Jürisson (1928–2023), poet, translator, children's writer

== K ==
- Maie Kalda (1929–2013), literary scholar, critic
- Elvy Kalep (1899–1989), aviator, artist, children's writer
- Madde Kalda (1903–1984), novelist
- Kätlin Kaldmaa (born 1970), writer, poet, translator, literary critic
- Aino Kallas (1878–1956), Finnish-Estonian short story writer, diarist, playwright
- Maarja Kangro (born 1973), poet, short story writer, librettist
- Doris Kareva (born 1958), poet, translator
- Urve Karuks (1936–2015), poet, translator
- Merle Karusoo (born 1944), playwright, biographer, theatre director
- Kristiina Kass (born 1970), children's writer, illustrator
- Leida Kibuvits (1907–1976), writer
- Veronika Kivisilla (born 1978), poet, critic
- Lydia Koidula, pen name of Lydia Emilie Florentine Jannsen (1843–1886), early poet, playwright, journalist, translator
- Marju Kõivupuu (born 1960), philologist, cultural historian, folklorist
- Ilmi Kolla (1933–1954), poet

== L ==
- Herta Laipaik (1921–2008), novelist, short story writer, poet
- Anu Lamp (born 1958), translator, actress
- Eha Lättemäe (1922–2012), poet
- Ira Lember (1926–2025), children's writer, novelist, poet
- Viivi Luik (born 1946), poet, essayist, children's writer

== M ==
- Heljo Mänd (1926–2020), poet, editor, novelist, children's writer
- Helmi Mäelo (1898–1978), writer, activist
- Kersti Merilaas (1913–1986), poet, children's writer, playwright, translator
- Ene Mihkelson (1944–2017), poet, novelist, essayist, short story writer
- Reed Morn (1898–1978), novelist and short story writer
- Kati Murutar (born 1967), prose writer, screenwriter, journalist

== N ==
- Ellen Niit (1928–2016), children's writer, poet, translator
- Dagmar Normet (1921–2008), novelist, essayist, playwright
- Minni Nurme (1917–1994), poet, prosaist

== O ==
- Liisi Ojamaa (1972–2019), poet, translator, literary critic, editor

== P ==
- Imbi Paju (born 1959), journalist, film director, working in Finland
- Milvi Panga (born 1945), poet, children's writer
- Eeva Park (born 1950), poet, novelist
- Aino Pervik (1932–2025), children's writer, translator
- Epp Petrone (born 1974), journalist, blogger, children's writer, publisher
- Asta Põldmäe (born 1944), short story writer, children's writer, translator
- Eve Pormeister (born 1956), Germanist, literary scholar, critic and cultural mediator
- Ketlin Priilinn (born 1982), writer, translator, journalist
- Lilli Promet (1922–2007), journalist, novelist, essayist, short story writer

== R ==
- Helju Rebane (born 1948), prose writer, science fiction writer
- Astrid Reinla (1948–1995), children's writer, short story writer, screenwriter

== S ==
- Anu Saluäär (born 1948), translator, editor, essayist
- Olivia Saar (1931–2025), children's writer, poet, journalist, editor
- Mari Saat (born 1947), novelist, short story writer
- Ly Seppel (born 1943), poet, translator
- Marta Sillaots (1887–1969), novelist, children's writer, translator, literary critic
- Kertu Sillaste (born 1973), children's writer
- Yelena Skulskaya (born 1950)
- Lilli Suburg (1841–1923), journalist, essayist, short story writer

== T ==
- Malle Talvet-Mustonen (born 1955), literary translator and poet
- Andra Teede (born 1988), poet, playwright, screenwriter
- Leida Tigane (1908–1983), prose writer, children's writer
- Tiia Toomet (born 1947), children's writer, poet
- Leelo Tungal (born 1947), children's writer, novelist, librettist

== U ==
- Kauksi Ülle (born 1962), writer, poet
- Marie Under (1883–1980), poet
- Eia Uus (born 1985), novelist, short story writer

== V ==
- Debora Vaarandi (1916–2007), writer
- Kätlin Vainola (born 1978), children’s writer, poet
- Aidi Vallik (born 1971), children's writer, poet, playwright, translator, columnist, screenwriter
- Elo Viiding (born 1974), poet, short story writer

== W ==
- Hella Wuolijoki (1886–1954), Estonian-born Finnish novelist writing under the pen name Juhani Tervapää

== See also ==
- List of Estonians
- List of women writers
