= Raud =

Family name

Raud is an Estonian surname (meaning "iron"), with notable bearers including:

- Eno Raud (1928–1996), children's writer
- Ilmar Raud (1913–1941), chess master
- Kristjan Raud (1865–1943), painter and draughtsman
- Mart Raud (1903–1980), poet, playwright and writer
- Mihkel Raud (born 1969), singer, guitarist and journalist
- Paul Raud (1865–1930), artist
- Piret Raud (born 1971), artist and writer
- Rein Raud (born 1961), writer and japanophile, former rector of Tallinn University

== See also ==
- Roud (disambiguation)
