= Anu Raud =

Estonian textile artist and author (born 1943)

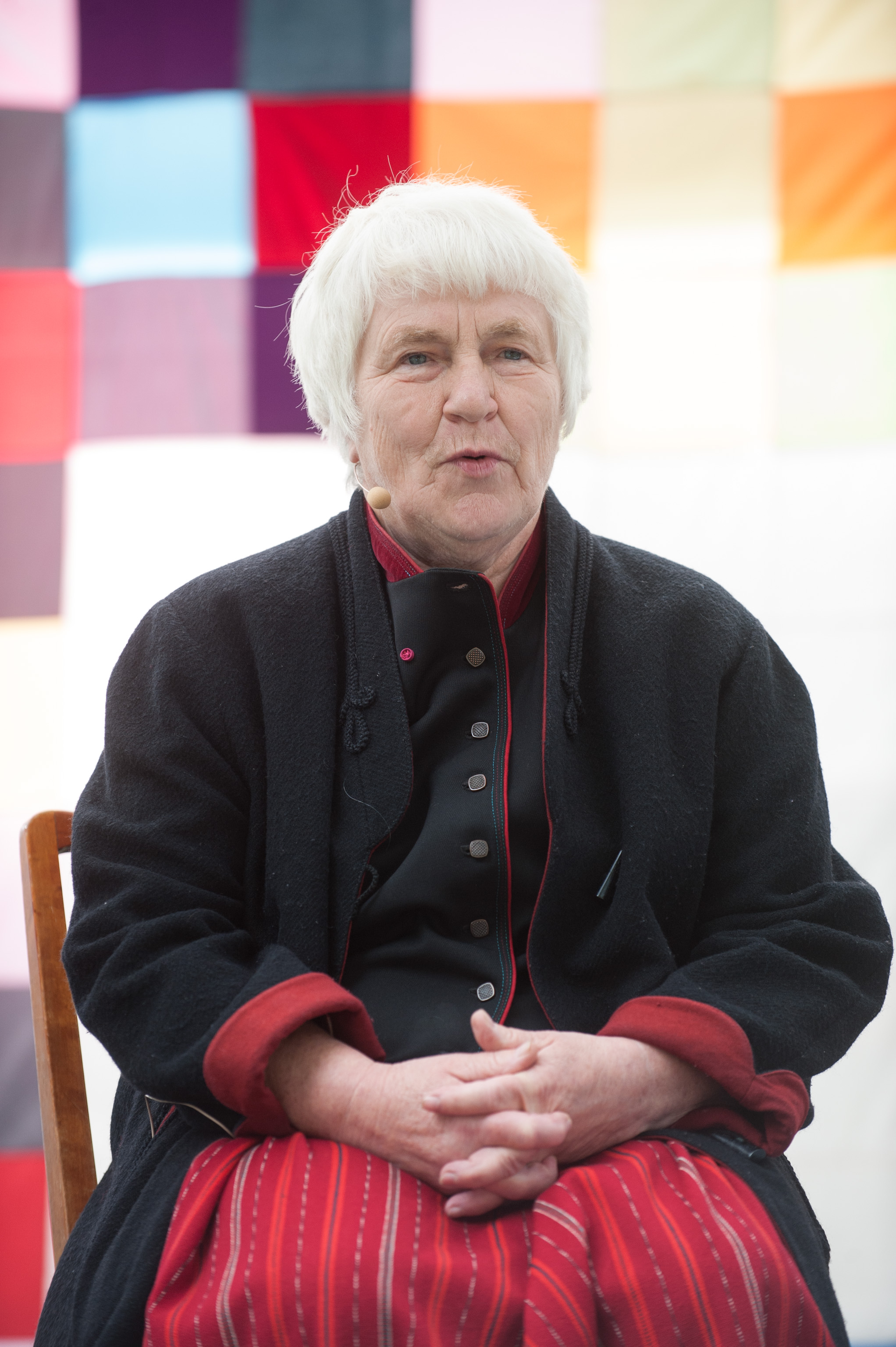
- Anu Raud at the 2014 Arvamusfestival
- Born: May 10, 1943 (age 83); Moscow, Russia
- Citizenship: Estonian
- Education: State Art Institute of the Estonian SSR
- Known for: Textile artist, academic lecturer
- Notable work: "Kodutuled (1979); "Laulupeole 150" (2019); "Tartu rahu 100" (2020)
- Relatives: Valda Raud (mother), Mart Raud (writer) (father), Annus Raud (brother), Eno Raud (half-brother)
- Awards: 1978, 1994 Kristjan Raud Award; 1998 Order of the White Star, III class

Anu Raud (born 10 May 1943, in Moscow, Russia) is an Estonian textile artist is an Estonian textile artist, academic, and writer. She has been recognised nationally for her contributions to preserving Estonian folk art. Raud studied textile art at the Estonian Academy of Arts and later worked as a lecturer and professor at both her alma mater and the Viljandi Culture Academy. Her work includes tapestries inspired by Estonian folklore and the natural landscape. In addition to her studio work, Raud founded the Heimtali Museum in Viljandi, donating her personal collection of local textiles and heritage items to the Estonian National Museum. She is an elected member of the Estonian Academy of Sciences and has published several books reflecting on nature and traditional Estonian culture. She has been a lecturer at the Estonian Academy of Arts and Viljandi Culture Academy.

== Early life and career ==
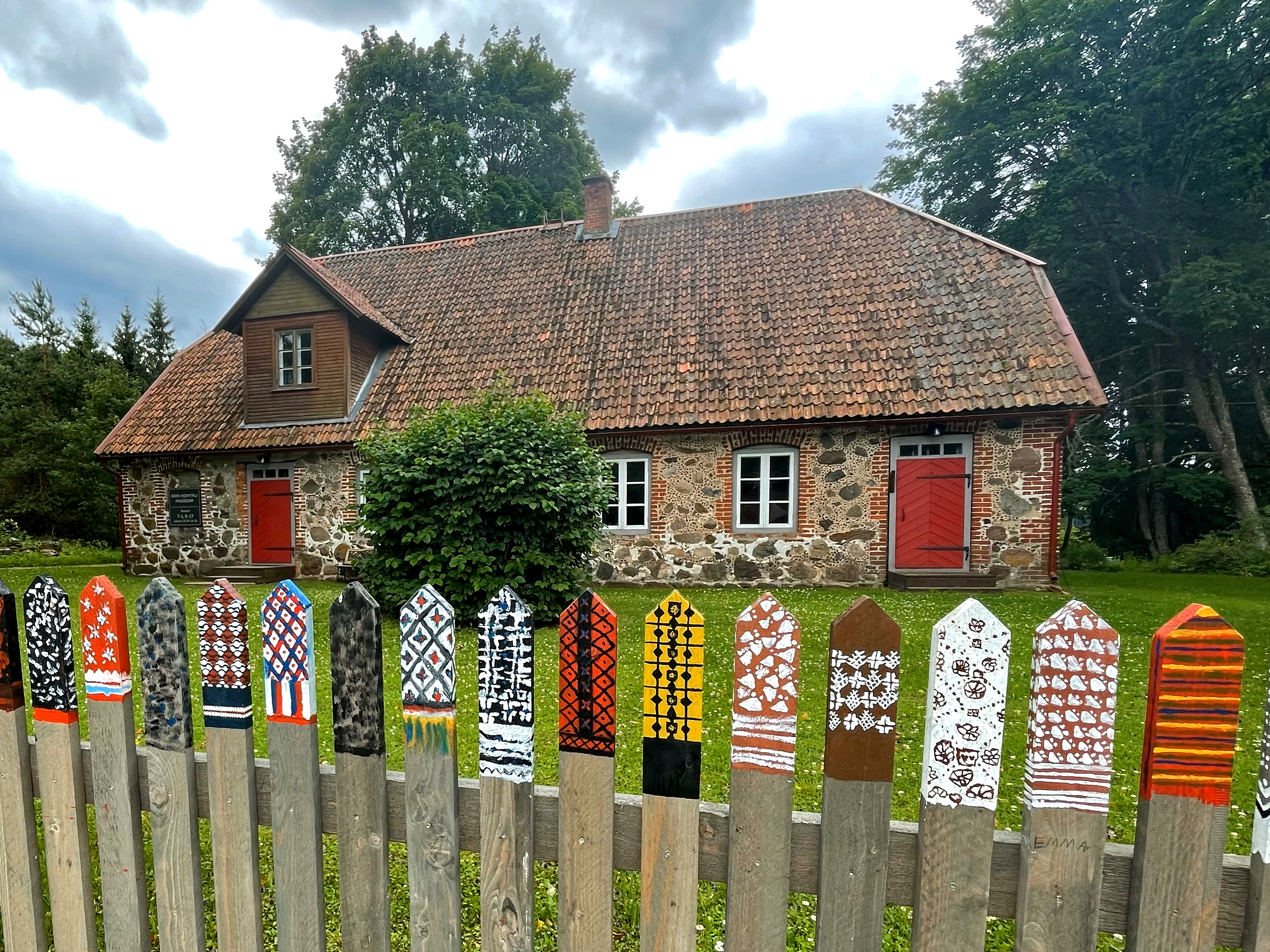
Raud's childhood home in Viljandi, which is now the Heimtali muuseum.

Raud was born in 1943, in Moscow, Russia.

She graduated in 1961 from Tallinn Secondary School No. 22, where she was taught by Toomas Lepiksaar and Kaljo Põllu. The following year, she entered the State Art Institute, graduating in 1967 with a degree in textile design.

From 1967 to 1970, Raud worked as an artist for the folk art masters association Uku. She then studied art history at the Institute of History of the Academy of Sciences from 1970 to 1972. From 1972 to 1995, she was a senior lecturer and associate professor at the Estonian Academy of Arts. From 1994 to 2001, she was a professor at Viljandi Culture College, establishing the specialities of farm design and national crafts, and serving as head of department. From 2001 to 2006, she was a professor in the folk art chair at the Estonian Academy of Arts, becoming professor emerita in 2009.

As a lecturer, Raud has contributed to training successive generations of Estonian textile artists since 1972, supervising folk art practicals for students at the Estonian Academy of Arts, the University of Tartu Viljandi Culture Academy, and the Tartu Art College. She is regarded as an inspiration and mentor to an entire generation of textile artists who respect ancestral heritage. Raud was elected as an academician in the Division of Humanities and Social Sciences of the Estonian Academy of Sciences in 2016. In 1991, Raud established a textile museum room in her family home, called the Heimtali Museum. She is the developer and caretaker of the museum. She later donated the museum to the Estonian National Museum on the occasion of its 100th anniversary.

In 1991, Raud established a museum room at her father, Mart Raud's childhood farm. She exhibited her textile items there. The building is located in the village of Heimtali in Viljandi Parish. The first local history museum in Heimtali had been started by Johannes Kokk in 1987 and in 1992, Anu Raud purchased the decaying museum building. In 2009, Anu Raud donated the museum along with its collections to the Estonian National Museum (ERM), and from 1 June 2010, the Heimtali Museum has been operating as part of the Estonian National Museum. Raud is still involved with the museum, which offers craft training courses, and a permanent exhibition with rotating exhibitions. The museum organises events, rents out premises, and offers educational programmes and workshops. A museum shop sells local crafts and publications. Its permanent exhibition, ‘Wisdom of Life from Generation to Generation’, showcases 200 years of local school history, historical tools, and a textile collection. Rotating exhibitions focus on historical craft techniques and feature personal exhibitions by artists. Guided tours allow visitors to examine items closely. The museum’s collection includes many items from Mulgimaa, with 1,800 objects, 1,500 archival sources, and 700 photographs. Raud's personal collection of traditional handicraft was gifted to the museum and is exhibited there.

She has been a member of the Estonian Academy of Sciences since 2016. Since 2009, she has been a Professor Emeritus of the National Academy of Arts.

== Work ==
=== Themes ===
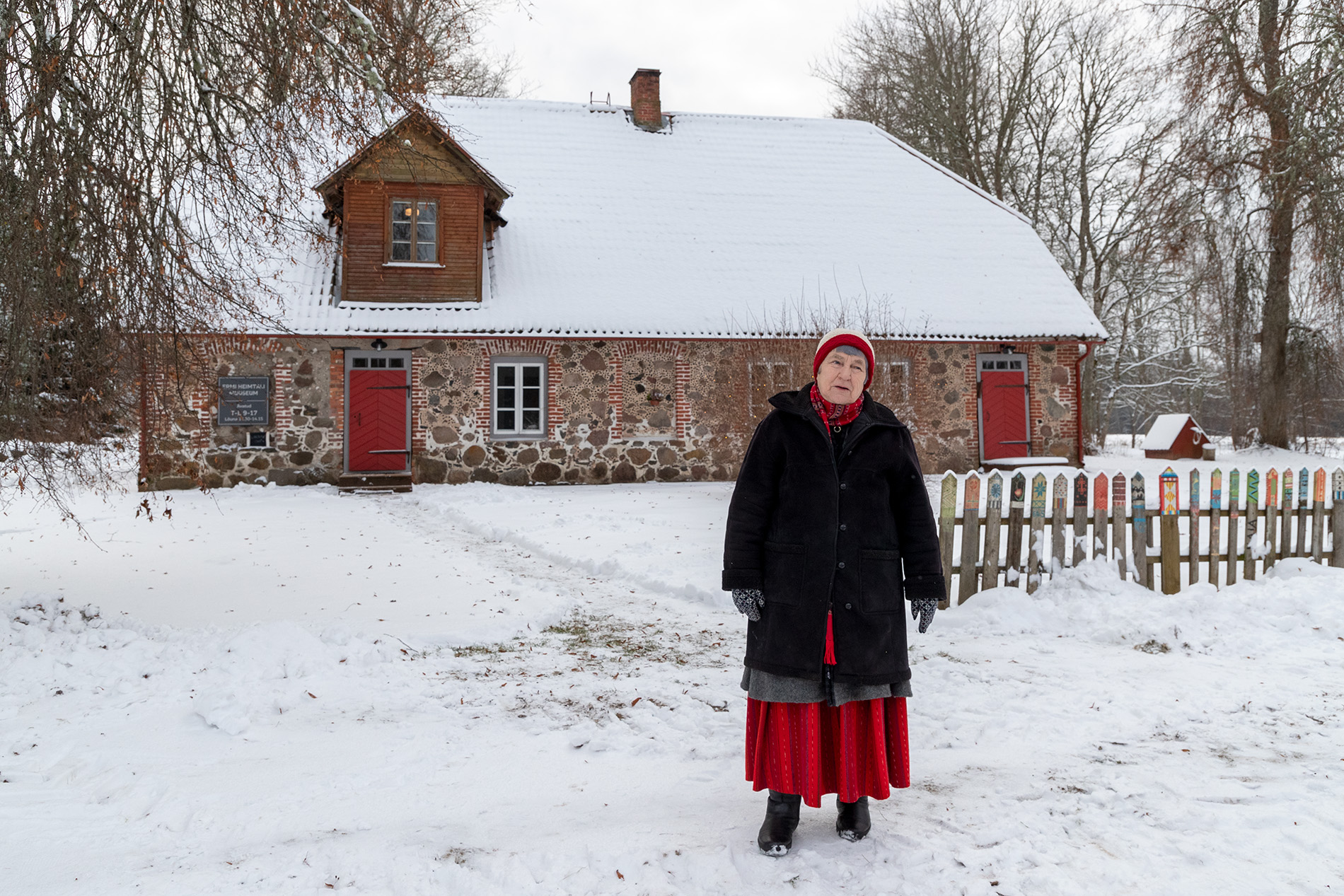
Anu Raud in front of the Heimtali Museum. Photo: Anu Ansu, ERM

Raud has been deeply influenced by her cultural heritage as an Estonian and her background. Her carpet art represents Estonian culture and folk art. She has worked as a teacher, carpet artist, writer, museum founder, and farmer and her various life experiences can be seen in her work.

She completed her first carpet, "Mets," which translatees to "Forest", shortly after graduating from art institute. While working at Uku, she worked in the islands which led her to have close ties with Kihnu Island, which also impacted her work. Nature and home form the core of her work which is heavily influenced by folk art. These themes are also reflected in her textile carpet "Kodutuled" which translates as "Home Fires". She completed the work in 1979 and it was awarded the Kristjan Raud Prize. She is also known for the carpet "Teerist" which translates to Crossroads. It was created for the St John's Church in Viljandi.

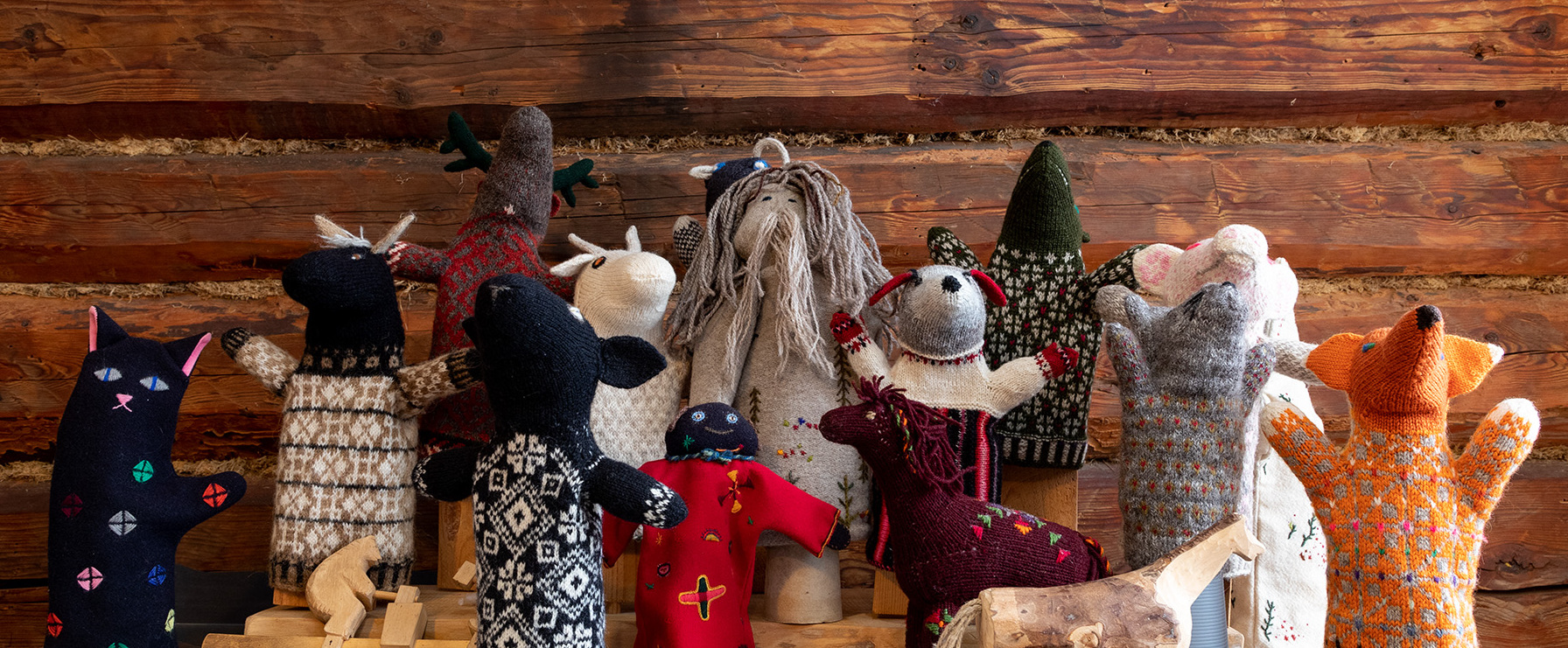
Knitting from Raud's workshop at the Heimtali muuseum.

=== Selected solo exhibitions ===
- 2013 "Eesti asi" (Estonian Thing), Tallinn Art Hall and Tallinn St John's Church
- 2013–2014 Solo exhibition, Vana-Võromaa Gallery
- 2014–2015 "Lõpik", Viimsi Coastal Folk Museum and Viimsi St James Church
- 2016 "Vabadus" (Freedom), Toompea Castle Art Hall
- 2018 "Isamaastikud" (Fatherland Landscapes), Estonian National Museum
- 2018–2019 "Issaristike", Tallinn St John's Church
- 2020 "Tähisvaibad" (Marked Carpets), Tallinn St John's Church
- 2022–2023 "Kuue ruuduga aken" (Window with Six Panes), Valga Museum (visual sequel to the book of the same name)

=== Selected works in collections ===
- Estonian Museum of Applied Art and Design
- Estonian National Museum
- Estonian History Museum
- Museum of New Art, Pärnu
- Art Collection of Queen Elizabeth II, United Kingdom

== Awards ==
- 1979 Kristjan Raud Prize (carpet "Kodutuled")
- 1981 Merited Artist of the Estonian SSR
- 1994 Estonian Rebirth Award
- 1995 Kristjan Raud Prize (for promoting and advancing folk art: solo exhibition at the Adamson-Eric Museum)
- 1995 Viljandi City Culture Award
- 1998 Order of the White Star, 3rd Class
- 1999 Heritage Keeper (first individual award for outstanding activity in preserving and valuing national handicraft traditions)
- 2000 Annual Award of the Endowment for Folk Culture of the Cultural Endowment of Estonia (finding a contemporary form for folk art)
- 2001 Rukkirääk Culture Award
- 2001 Annual Award of the Endowment for Folk Culture of the Cultural Endowment of Estonia (finding a contemporary form for folk art)
- 2006 Annual Award for Folk Culture of the Cultural Endowment of Estonia (as a carpet artist and teacher, mistress of the Heimtali Museum and Kääriku farm – for valuing, preserving, and passing on folk art)
- 2008 Textile Artist of the Year
- 2012 Lifetime Achievement Thank-You Award of the Estonian National Culture Foundation
- 2013 National Thought Award
- 2013 TriikRaud Award
- 2014 Cultural Award of the Republic of Estonia for lifetime achievement
- 2017 Estonian Council of Churches Media Prize
- 2019 Woman of the Year (awarded by the Estonian Association of Business and Professional Women)
- 2022 Annual Award of the Endowment for Folk Culture of the Cultural Endowment of Estonia (together with Tuuli Tubin McGinley; for popularising a sustainable and conservative lifestyle and organising a trouser-patching competition and exhibition)
- 2023 Eduard Vilde Literary Award (for the book "Kuue ruuduga aken")
- 2023 Order of the Cross of Terra Mariana / EELK Cross of Merit, 3rd Class
- 2025 Gratitude Medal of the EELK Viljandi St John's Congregation

== Personal life ==
Her mother Valda Raud was a translator. Her father was writer Mart Raud (writer). Her brother is translator Annus Raud, and her half-brother was writer Eno Raud.

In 2002, Mark Soosaar directed the documentary film about her, "Anu Raud, elumustrid" which translates to "Patterns of Life". In 2021, Erle Veber directed the documentary "Pärand. Anu Raud" which translates as "Heritage: Anu Raud".
