= Aino Pervik =

Estonian writer and translator (1932–2025)

- Pervik in the 1980s
- Born: 22 April 1932; Rakvere, Estonia
- Died: 12 August 2025 (aged 93); Tallinn, Estonia
- Education: University of Tartu
- Occupations: Children's writer; Translator
- Spouse: Eno Raud (m. 1961; died 1996)
- Children: Rein Raud; Mihkel Raud; Piret Raud
- Writing career
- Notable awards: Juhan Smuul literary award; Friedebert Tuglas short story award; Order of the White Star

Aino Pervik (22 April 1932 – 12 August 2025) was an Estonian children's writer and translator. Pervik was considered "the bravest children's writer" in Estonia, as she took on themes of immigration, cultural conflict, corruption, and the loss of cultural identity. Some of her more than 60 children's books were reprinted and translated into many languages. She also wrote novellas and poetry, and translated literature from Hungarian.

== Life and career ==
Pervik was born in Rakvere on 22 April 1932. She attended school first in Järvakandi from 1939, then in Tallinn at a teachers seminary from 1946 to 1950. She studied Finno-Ugric philology at the Tartu State University from 1950, graduating in 1955.

Pervik lived in Tallinn from 1955. She worked as an editor of children's and young-adult literature for the Estonian State Publishing House, and from 1960 as editor of programs for young people for Eesti Televisioon (ETV). She published her first children's book, Kersti sõber Miina (Kersti's Friend Miina), in 1961. From 1967, she was a freelance writer and translator from Hungarian, translating books by Emil Kolozsvári Grandpierre, Éva Janikovszky, Iván Mándy and Kálmán Mikszáth. She joined the Estonian Writers' Union in 1974. Her books were translated into many languages. She also wrote novellas and poetry.

Pervik received the Juhan Smuul literary award in 1976, the Friedebert Tuglas short story award in 1983 and the annual award of the Estonian Writers' Union in 2012, among many awards.

=== Personal life ===
Pervik married writer Eno Raud in 1961; they had three children: scholar and writer Rein Raud, musician and writer Mihkel Raud and children's writer and illustrator Piret Raud. Her husband died in 1996.

Pervik died on 12 August 2025, at the age of 93.

== Work ==
Pervik wrote more than 60 children's books; some of them were translated, into 12 languages, and were adapted for stage and film. Her topics include preservation of ecological balance, clashes of different cultures, finding of identity, war and freedom. In her children's books, she combined fairy-tale and fantasy elements with realistic everyday life, with an aim of didacticism. Among her best-known books are Kunksmoor, Arabella, the Pirate's daughter, and Dear mr Q.

=== Books ===
- The Kite Spreads Friendship. 2021
- NummiPealt ja mujalt (From BonnyHead and Beyond), Tänapäev 2018
- Sinivant joonistab (Bluephant Draws), Tammerraamat 2017
- Hädaoru kuningas (The King of the Valley of Woes), Tänapäev 2016
- Sinivant kuulab unejuttu (Bluephant Hears a Bedtime Story), Tammerraamat 2016
- Jääpurikas, murelik piim ja teised tüübid (The Icicle, the Worried Milk, and Others), Tänapäev 2015
- Tähenärija ja Kriksadull (Starchewer and Cricksadull), Tänapäev 2015
- Härra Tee ja proua Kohv (Mr. Tea and Mrs. Coffee), Tänapäev 2014
- Sinivant läheb lasteaeda (Bluephant Goes to Preschool), Tammerraamat 2014
- Jänes keedab suppi (Rabbit Makes Soup), Päike ja Pilv 2013
- Väike valge pilvelammas, kes läks läbi vikerkaare (The Little White Cloud-Sheep Who Passed Through a Rainbow), Päike ja Pilv 2013
- Kirjatähtede keerukas elu (The Complex World of Letters), Tänapäev 2012
- Klabautermanni mure (Klabautermann’s Problem), Tänapäev 2012
- Rändav kassiemme (The Wandering Cat), Tammerraamat 2012
- Kersti sõber Miina (Kersti's Friend Miina), Tallinn: Kirjastus Tirtiamm, 1961.

=== Tirilinn series ===
- Aiapidu roosiaias (Garden Party at the Rose Garden), Tammerraamat 2009
- Krokodill (Crocodile), Tammerraamat 2009
- Kui sa näed korstnapühkijat (If You See a Chimney Sweep), Tammerraamat 2009
- Tirilinnas algab kool (School Starts in Tirilinna), Tammerraamat 2009
- Piknik Ristineemel (A Picnic at Ristineeme), Tammerraamat 2010
- Jüri soolaleivapidu (Jüri’s Housewarming Party), Tammerraamat 2011
- Isegi Max ei usu enam (Even Max Doesn't Believe Anymores), Tammerraamat 2012
- Ühes väikses veidras linnas (In an Odd Little Town), Tänapäev 2009
- Presidendilood (Stories of a President), Tänapäev 2008, rev. ed. 2013
- Suleline, Puhuja ja must munk (Feathered, Blower, and the Black Monk), Tänapäev 2007
- Dixi ja Xixi (Dixi and Xixi), Ilo 2005
- Draakonid võõrsil (The Dragons in a Foreign Land), Tiritamm 2002
- Mammutilaps ajab tuult taga (The Little Mammoth Catches the Wind), Avita 2002

=== Paula's Life series ===
- Paula lõpetab lasteaia (Paula Finishes Kindergarten), Tiritamm 2001, 2007, 2020
- Paula läheb linna elama (Paula Moves to the city), Tiritamm 2001, 2007, 2020
- Paula esimene koolipäev (Paula’s First Day of School), Tiritamm 2001, 2007, 2021
- Paula ja Joosep (Paula and Joseph), Tiritamm 2001, 2020
- Paula ja õuelapsed (Paula and the Neighborhood Kids), Tiritamm 2002, 2020
- Paula õpib emakeelt (Paula Learns Her Mother Tongue), illustrated by Piret Raud. Tiritamm 2003, 2009
- Paula ja Patrik (Paula and Patrick), Tiritamm 2002, 2021
- Paula aabits (Paula’s Book of ABCs), illustrated by Piret Raud. Tallinn: Kirjastus Tiritamm, 2007.
- Maailm Sulelise ja Karvasega (The World with Feathered and Furry), Varrak 2000
- Kallis härra Q (Dear mr Q), Kupar 1992, illustrated by Edgar Valter; Avita 2004, Tänapäev, 2016
- Sookoll ja sisalik (Bog Bogey and Lizard), Eesti Raamat 1986, Tiritamm 2004
- Arabella, mereröövli tütar (Arabella, the Pirate’s Daughter), Eesti Raamat 1982 2008, Tänapäev 2011
- Kunksmoor ja kapten Trumm (Old Mother Kunks and Captain Trumm), Eesti Raamat 1975, Tammerraamat 2011
- Kunksmoor (Old Mother Kunks), Eesti Raamat 1973, Tammerraamat 2012
- Kaarist on kasu (Kaari is a Helper), Eesti Raamat 1971, 1972, TEA Kirjastus 2010

== Awards ==
Awards for Pervik's books include:

- 2023 Latvian Children's, Young Adults' and Parents' Jury, nominated (age 11+): Old Mother Kunks
- 2018 Estonial National Lifetime Achievement Award for Culture
- 2006–2012, 2018 Astrid Lindgren Memorial Award candidate
- 2018 Good Children’s Book (From BonnyHead and Beyond)
- 2017 National Lifetime Achievement Award for Culture
- 2016 Annual Children’s Literature Award of the Cultural Endowment of Estonia (The King of the Walley of Woes)
- 2015 Jānis Baltvilks Prize (Jāņa Baltvilka balva), Latvia (Stories of a President)
- 2014 Hans Christian Andersen Award nominee
- 2014 Good Children's Book (Bluephant Goes to Preschool)
- 2014 Järje Hoidja Award of the Tallinn Central Library (Härra Tee ja Proua Kohvi / Mr. Tea and Mrs. Coffee)
- 2012 Annual Award of the Cultural Endowment of Estonia (The Complex World of Letters, Klabautermann's Problem, The Wandering Cat)
- 2012 Good Children's Book (Klabautermann’s Problem)
- 2010 Awards from the Estonian Children’s Literature Centre (In an Odd Little Town)
- 2008 Järje Hoidja Award of the Tallinn Central Library (Paula sõidab kevadet vaatama / Paula Goes to See Spring)
- 2006 J. Oro Prize for Children's Literature
- 2004 Nukits Competition (Paula series)
- 2004 IBBY Honour List (Paula Learns Her Mother Tongue), nominated
- 2001 Order of the White Star of Estonia
- 2001 Annual Children's Literature Award of the Cultural Endowment of Estonia (Paula series)
- 2000 Winning book of "Hundred of the Century" poll (Old Mother Kunks, Old Mother Kunks and Captain Trumm)
- 1993 Annual Estonian Writers' Union Prize (Dear Mr. Q and play Bog Bogey and Lizard)
- 1988 USSR Children's Book Competition, 2nd place (Old Mother Kunks, Old Mother Kunks and Captain Trumm)
- 1983 Friedebert Tuglas short story award for Anna
- 1976 Juhan Smuul literary award (Old Mother Kunks and Captain Trumm)

== Translations ==
Many of Pervik's books have been translated, including:

- Arabella, the Pirate’s Daughter
  - Russian: Арабелла – дочь пирата, Vene Entsüklopeedia 2001, Tänapäev 2011
  - Finnish: Arabella, merirosvon tytär, WSOY 1987
  - English: Arabella, the Pirate’s Daughter, Perioodika 1985, new translation Tänapäev 2011
  - German: Arabella die Piratentochter, Perioodika 1985; German: Leiv 2012
  - Vietnamese: Arabenla con gái tên cướp biển, 1987
- Bog Bogey and Lizard, English, Perioodika 1988
- Old Mother Kunks
  - Latvian: Burmemme, 2022
  - Azerbaijani: Гянджлик 1982
  - German: Die Kunksmuhme, LeiV 2079
  - Russian: Баба-Мора, Eesti Raamat 1977, 1982
  - Finnish: Konkkamuori, WSOY 1975
- Old Mother Kunks and Captain Trumm
  - German: Die Kunksmuhme, LeiV 2012
  - Russian: Баба-Мора и капитан Трумм, Eesti Raamat 1983
  - Finnish: Konkkamuori ja kapteeni Trummi, WSOY 1978
- Paula and Patrik, Lithuanian: Paula ir Patrikas, Nieko rimto 2008
- Paula and Patrik + Paula and the Neighborhood Kids + Paula Goes to the Store + Paula Goes on a Picnic + Paula is Taken to the Hospital', Russian: Паула: продолжение, Aleksandra 2013
- Paula Finishes Kindergarten
  - Lithuanian: Paula baigia vaikų darželį, Nieko rimto 2008
  - Russian: Паула: выпускной в детскoм садy, Aleksandra 2007
- Paula Moves to the City + Paula and Joosep + Paula’s First Day of School + Paula’s Christmas, Russian: Паула, Aleksandra 2011
- Stories of a President
  - Latvian: Prezidents, Liels un mazs 2015
  - Russian: Как работать президентом, КПД 2013
  - Bulgarian: Приключенията на президента, Gaiana 2009
- The Balloon
  - Latvian: Gaisa baloninš, Liesma 1972
  - Lithuanian: Balionėlis, Vagos 1972
- The Wandering Cat, Italian: La gatta vagabonda, Sinnos 2014
- The World with Feathered and Furry, Russian: Мир с Пернатой и Мохнатым, Vene Entsüklopeedia 2004
