= Adorf (surname) =

Adorf is a German surname. Notable people with the surname include:

- Dirk Adorf (born 1969), German racing driver
- Margit Adorf (born 1974), Estonian journalist and poet
- Mario Adorf (1930–2026), German actor and writer
