= Aadu Hint =

Estonian writer

Aadu Hint (birthname Adolf Edmund Hint; 10 January 1910, Külasema, Muhu Island – 26 October 1989, Tallinn) was an Estonian writer. Most of his books are related to people living on Estonian islands.

After studying in Lümanda and Kuressaare, he worked as a teacher. From 1940 to 1947, he was a deputy in the Supreme Soviet of the ESSR. From second half of 1940s, he was a professional writer and lived in Tallinn.

He was married to Debora Vaarandi (1916–2007) and Minni Nurme (1917–1994). He had eight children. Several of them became writers, such as Eeva Park. He died in 1989. He is buried in Kihelkonna Cemetery, Saare County.

== Works ==
- 1937: Kuldne värav (The Golden Gate), novel
- 1950: Angerja teekond (The Path of the Eel), story
- 1951–1966: Tuuline rand (The Windy Shore, I–IV), four-part novel
