= Aidu, Viljandi County =

Village in Estonia

Aidu
- Village
- Location in Estonia
- Coordinates: 58°14′58″N 25°36′40″E
- Country: Estonia
- County: Viljandi County
- Municipality: Viljandi Parish

Aidu (German: Aidenhof) is a village in Viljandi Parish, Viljandi County, Estonia. It was a part of Paistu Parish until 2013.

Aidu is the birthplace of the Estonian poet, playwright, and writer Mart Raud (1903–1980) and the writer Minni Nurme (1917–1994).
