= Silvia Airik-Priuhka =

Estonian writer and poetry translator (1926–2014)

Silvia Airik-Priuhka (25 January 1926 in Tallinn – 11 February 2014 in Stockholm) was an Estonian writer and poetry translator.

She studied at Elfriede Lender Private Gymnasium in Tallinn, graduating in 1944. In autumn 1944, she escaped from the Soviet-occupied Estonia, via Finland, to Sweden.

== Works ==
- Est! Est! Est! Stockholm, 1980.
- Hammarbyhöjdeni Seppe. Stockholm, 1983.
- Vanaisa hingeke. Tallinn, 1992.
- Ilma nõela pistmata. Tallinn, 1997.
- Ma lillesideme võtsin. Tallinn, 1998.
- Toonela väraval. Tartu, 2004.
