= Juhan Smuul literary award =

Estonian literary award

Juhan Smuul literary award (Estonian: Juhan Smuuli kirjanduse aastapreemia) is an Estonian literary award. The award, from 1972 named after the Estonian writer Juhan Smuul, was given out from 1970 to the beginning of 1990s and again from 1995 using the new name Eesti Kultuurkapital kirjanduse sihtkapitali aastapreemia (Estonian Cultural Endowment Annual Literary Endowment Award).

The award has many categories: e.g. best piece of prose, best piece of poetry, best piece of children's literature.
