= Hilda Dresen =

Estonian radio-telegraphist (1896–1981)

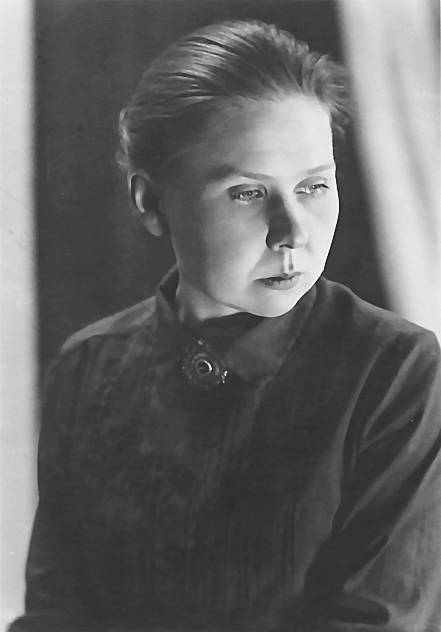
- Hilda Dresen (1934)
- Born: 11 May 1896; Kolga, Kreis Harrien, Governorate of Estonia, Russian Empire
- Died: 5 February 1981 (aged 84); Tallinn, then part of Estonian SSR, Soviet Union
- Known for: Translator of Estonian poetry into Esperanto

Hilda Dresen (11 May 1896 – 5 February 1981) was an Estonian radio-telegraphist and Esperantist translator. She mainly translated Estonian poetry into Esperanto.

== Biography ==
Hilda Dresen was born in Kolga. She was a younger sister of Helmi Dresen.

She studied Esperanto in 1913.

She did collaborations, e.g., for Literatura Mondo, La Nica Literatura Revuo, Norda Prismo (1955–1972).

In 1967, she also published her own poetry collection Norda Naturo (Northern Nature).
