= Salme Ekbaum =

Estonian writer (1912–1995)

Salme Ekbaum (until 1941 Salme Neumann; 21 October 1912 Paistu Parish, Viljandi County – 10 September 1995 Toronto) was an Estonian writer and poet.

She graduated from University of Tartu, studying pharmacy. In 1944 she fled the Soviet occupation of Estonia to Sweden and in 1949 moved to Canada.

From 1950 she was a member of Estonian Writers' Union in Exile and a member of PEN Club.

She died in 1995 and is buried in Paistu Cemetery. Her sister was writer Minni Nurme.

== Works ==
- 1959: novel Varjude maja (House of Shadows)
- 1975: novel Vang, kes põgenes (The Prisoner Who Escaped)
- 1979: novel Kohtumine lennujaamas (Meeting at an Airport)
