= Mart Raud (writer) =

Estonian writer

- Born: Martin Raud; 14 September 1903; Aidenhof, Kreis Fellin, Governorate of Livonia, Russian Empire
- Died: 6 July 1980 (aged 76); Tallinn, then part of Estonian SSR, Soviet Union
- Occupations: Novelist, poet, playwright
- Years active: 1925–1980
- Spouse: Valda Raud (née Aaviste)

Mart Raud (14 September 1903 – 6 July 1980) was an Estonian poet, playwright and novelist.

== Early life and education ==
Mart Raud was born in Aidu, Kreis Fellin, Governorate of Livonia today Viljandi County, Estonia. In 1923, he took the high school final exams in Tallinn as an external student. In 1923-1924, he studied violin at the Tartu High School of Music and was an audit at the Faculty of Philosophy of the University of Tartu.

== Career ==
Raud debuted as a poet in 1919. He was part a collective of friends who were later named "Arbujad" which represented a new direction in Estonian poetry before the World War II. Raud's first verse collections "Kangastused" (revelations), published in 1924 and the following "Äitsmik" in 1925 contain romantic visions of nature and use dialects. In the collection "Rusemed" (1927), the author's drifting towards more social poetry can be noticed. In the 1920s, in parallel with his poetry, he also started publishing short prose. His novels "Videvikus varvalgeni" (Dusk to dawn) in 1927 won the second prize in the annual Loodus publishing house competition and "Tuulte teedel" (On the roads of the winds) in 1928 won the third prize.

On 19 October 1931, Mart Raud was sentenced to three years in prison for forging the signatures on promissory notes. He fled to Finland, but was arrested there and was released to Estonian authorities. Following his early release from the prison Raud continued to be published. He was included in the anthology "Arbujad" (1938).

After the Soviet Occupation of Estonia on 17 June 1940 He quickly joined the Soviet side, volunteering for an extermination battalion on 2 July 1941. Raud earned five rubles a day as a member of his battalion. He had a rifle and he had to write reports about the fight against the forest brothers. In 1941 pro-Soviet cadres, including Raud, were evacuated to the Soviet rear. He worked as a Soviet propagandist, first in Chelyabinsk and Kuibyshev, and later in Moscow and Leningrad. He was loyal to the new regime and distanced himself from his previous literary companions, many of whom were deported to Siberia.

Raud returned to Estonia with the Red Army in 1944. He established himself at the top of the Soviet Estonian literature scene and joined the Communist Party in 1945. Writing propaganda pieces such as "Song for Stalin" (1951) and "Great October" He was awarded the honorary title of Meritorious Writer of the Estonian SSR in 1946 and People's Writer of the Estonian SSR in 1972.

== Family ==
Raud was married twice. From his first marriage to the educator Lea Raud he had a son, children's writer Eno Raud. From his second marriage to the translator Valda Raud he had daughter Anu Raud and son Annus Raud. His grandchildren are scholar and author Rein Raud, musician and journalist Mihkel Raud and artist and writer Piret Raud.
