= Minni Nurme =

Estonian writer

- Born: Minni Neumann; 30 October 1917; Aidu Parish, Governorate of Livonia, Russian Empire
- Died: 22 November 1994 (aged 77); Tallinn, Estonia
- Occupations: Writer, poet
- Years active: 1939–1994
- Spouse(s): Jan Raudsepp (1936–1941, divorced); Aadu Hint (1936–1958, divorced)
- Children: 6, including Eeva Park

Minni Katharina Nurme (born 30 October 1917 in Aidu Parish, today Viljandi Parish, Viljandi County; died 22 November 1994 in Tallinn) was an Estonian writer.

== Life and career ==
Born Minni Neumann, Nurme graduated from the girls' school in Viljandi in 1936. During World War II she lived behind Soviet lines; after the war she moved to Tallinn and worked as a freelance writer. Her first prose work was the 1939 novel Kentaurid (The Centaurs). Two years later came the novel Ratastool (The Wheelchair). She turned more and more to poetry during the war, and in 1945 published her first poetry collection, Sünnimuld (Mother Earth). Between her second and third collections came a ten-year hiatus, largely due to the harassment of Stalinist authorities. Nurme was also active as a translator, from Finnish and English.

Nurme's elder sister was the poet Salme Ekbaum. When she was married to Jan Raudsepp from 1936 until 1941 she was known as Minni Raudsepp. In 1941 she married the writer Aadu Hint. They divorced in 1958 and had five children, three sons and two daughters. The divorce was a scandal in Estonia. One of their daughters, Eeva Park, later became a well-known writer.

Eeva Park's 1993 novel Tolm ja Tuul describes the breakup of her parents' marriage.

== Works ==
=== Prose ===
- Kentaurid (novel, 1939)
- Ratastool (novel, 1941)
- Lämbumine (stories, 1946)
- Valus küsimus (short prose, 1962)
- Rähni laastud (short stories, 1966)

=== Poetry collection ===
- Sünnimuld (1945)
- Pikalt teelt (1947)
- Juured Mullas (1957)
- Maarjahein (selection, 1967)
- Sookailudes on loitsud (1971)
- Kuuvein (1974)
- Tuules lendlev seeme (1976)
- Pilvede pisarad tärkamisse (selection, 1978)
- Päevapuri (1981)
- Valgevalul (1983)
- Puud varjulised (selection, 1987)
