= Helmi Dresen =

Estonian translator, Esperantist

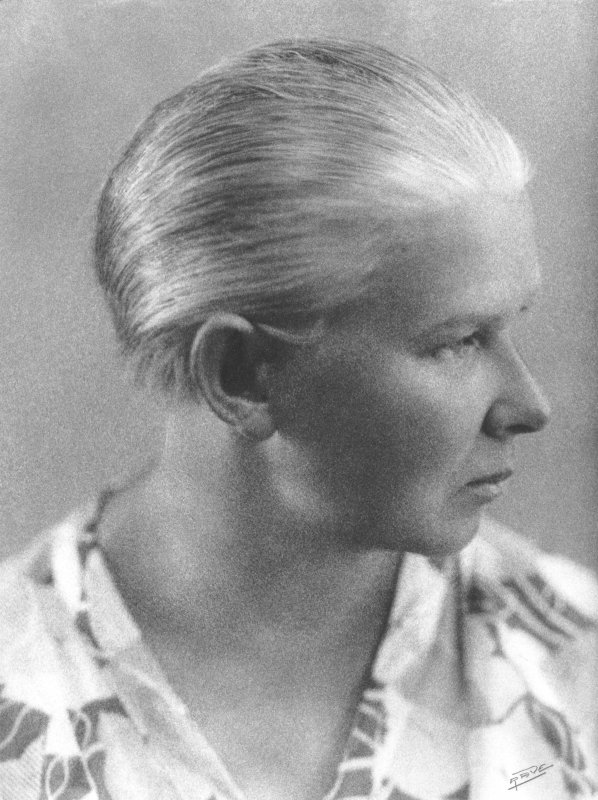
- Helmi Dresen, Estonian Esperantist in 1936
- Born: 4 July 1892; Kolga, Estonia
- Died: 25 September 1941 (aged 49)
- Cause of death: Gunshot
- Known for: Estonian translator, poet

Helmi Dresen (4 July 1892 – 25 September 1941) was an Estonian translator, poet, and Esperantist. She was the older sister of Hilda Dresen. She was shot by the Nazis.

== Life ==
She was born in Kolga. She learned Esperanto in 1912. In the 1920s, she headed the Vortara Komisiono ("Dictionary Commission") of the local Tallinn club, which led to the publication of an Esperanto-Estonian dictionary.

On 22 June 1941, the Nazis launched Operation Barbarossa, resulting in the capture of Tallinn. Several Esperantists were arrested and shot, including Helmi Dresen, Michaelis Dušanskis and Neeme Ruus.

== Works ==
- L'okuloj estis bluaj, la haroj el arĝento,
