= Eeva Park =

Estonian writer (born 1950)

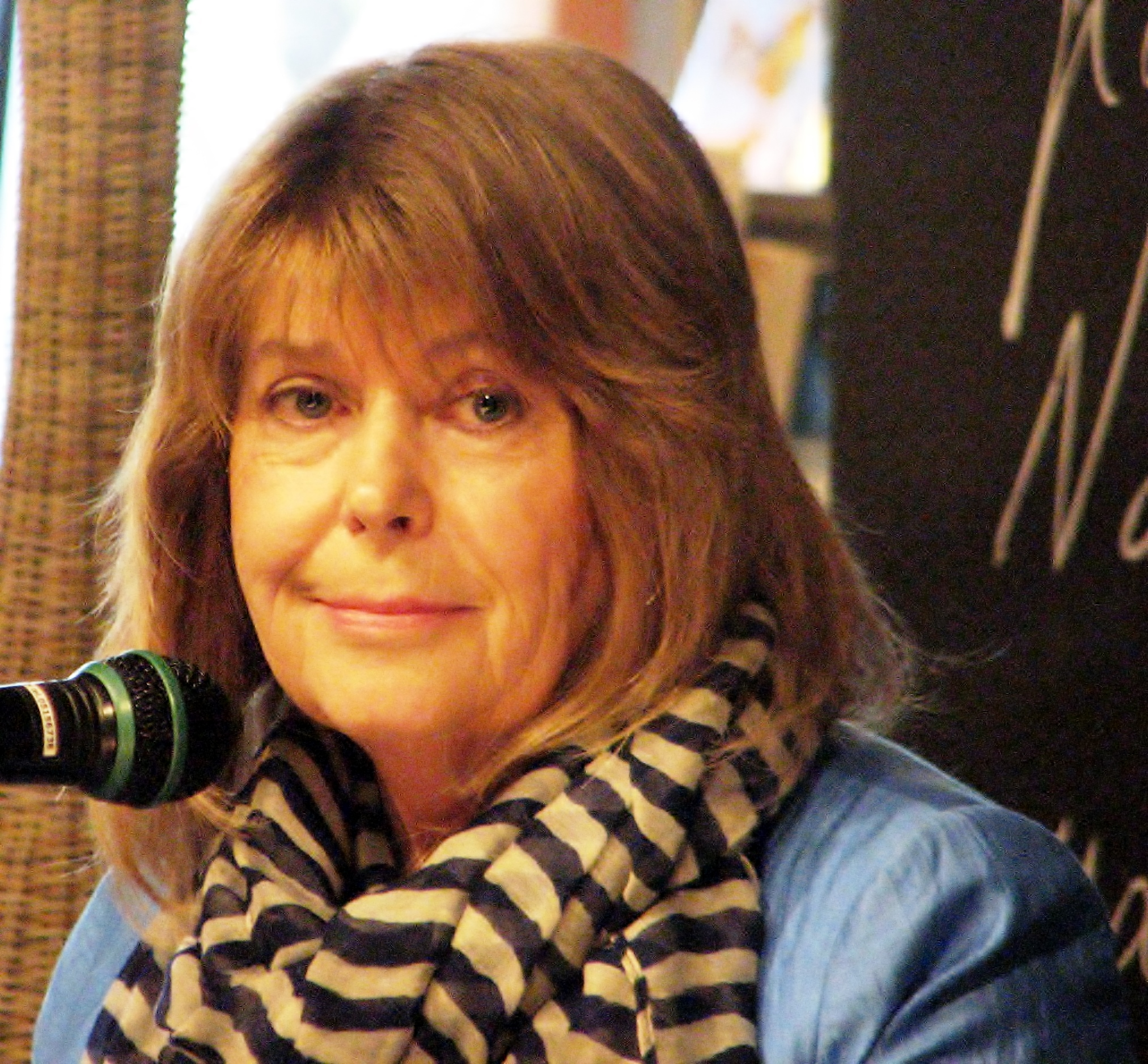
Park in 2014

Eeva Park (née Hint; born 9 September 1950) is an Estonian writer.

== Life ==
Park was born Eeva Hint in 1950 in Tallinn, the daughter of writers Aadu Hint and Minni Nurme. After high school she worked as a silk and porcelain painter, and as an archival assistant. She began her career in 1983 as a poet, but soon turned to prose. Her 1993 novel Tolm ja Tuul describes in a fairly obvious way the breakup of his parents' marriage.

She is known for her novels' dark undertones, but she has also written plays and short stories, as well as continuing to write poetry. Park has been a member of the Estonian Writers' Union since 1993. In 1994, she received the Friedebert Tuglas Literature Prize. She currently lives in Saku Parish.

== Works ==
- Mõrkjas tuul (poems, 1983)
- Hullu Hansu lugu (novel, 1988)
- Öö valgus (poems, 1990)
- Tolm yes tuul (novel, 1992)
- Mees, kes mäletas ELEVANT (short stories, 1994)
- Palveränd (Drama, 1996)
- Naru õpilane (novel, 1998)
- Pääse karussellile (short stories, 2000)
- Vaba long mine (poems, 2002)
- locomotives lõpmatuses (novel, 2003)
- Homsed uudised (poems, 2005)
- Absoluutne champions (short stories, 2006)
