= Rein Raud =

Estonian scholar and author (born 1961)

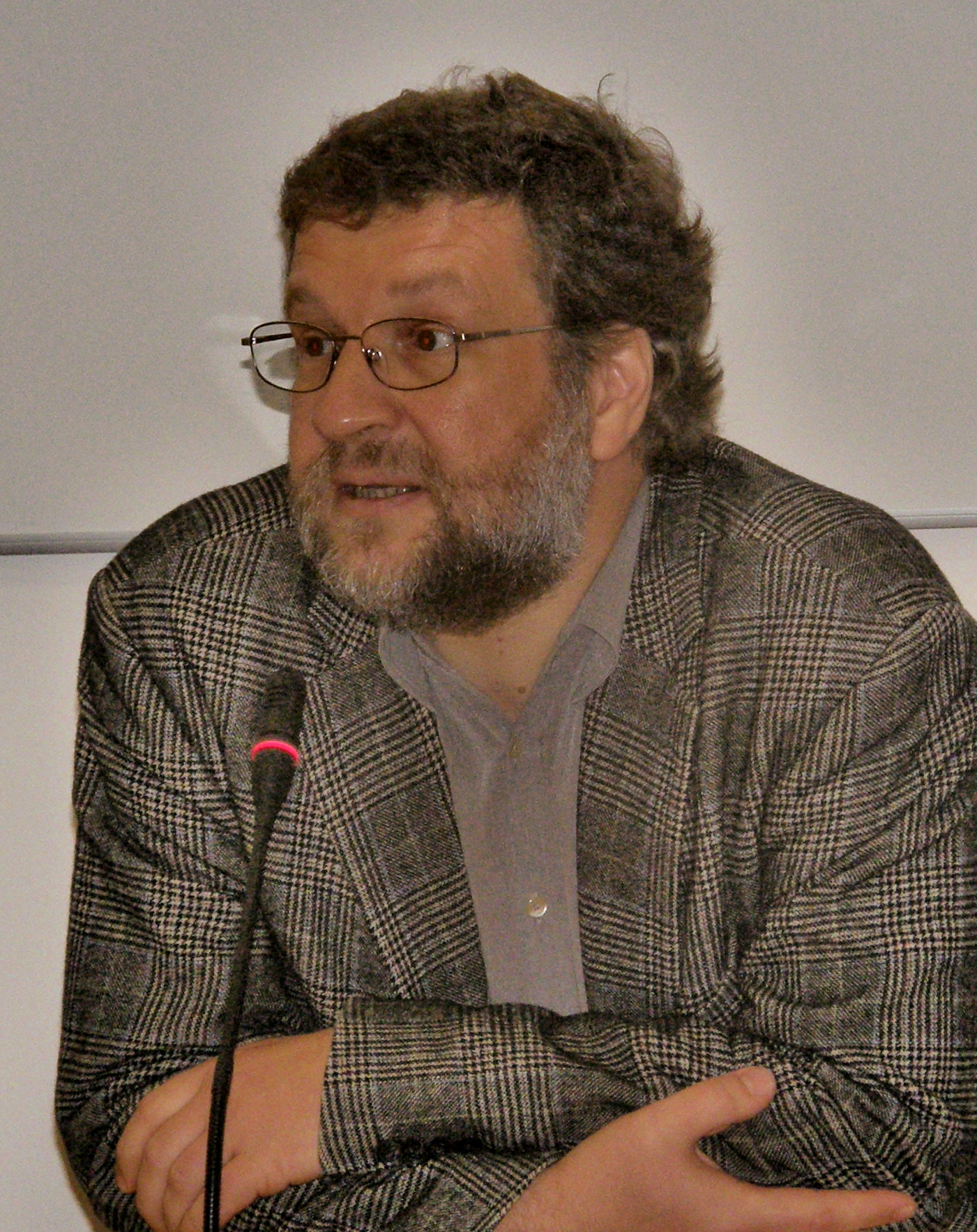
- Born: 21 December 1961 (age 64); Tallinn, Estonia

Philosophical work
- Main interests: Process philosophy · Ontology · Cultural theory · Japanese culture · Asian philosophy
- Notable ideas: Cognitive adequacy · Symbolic authority

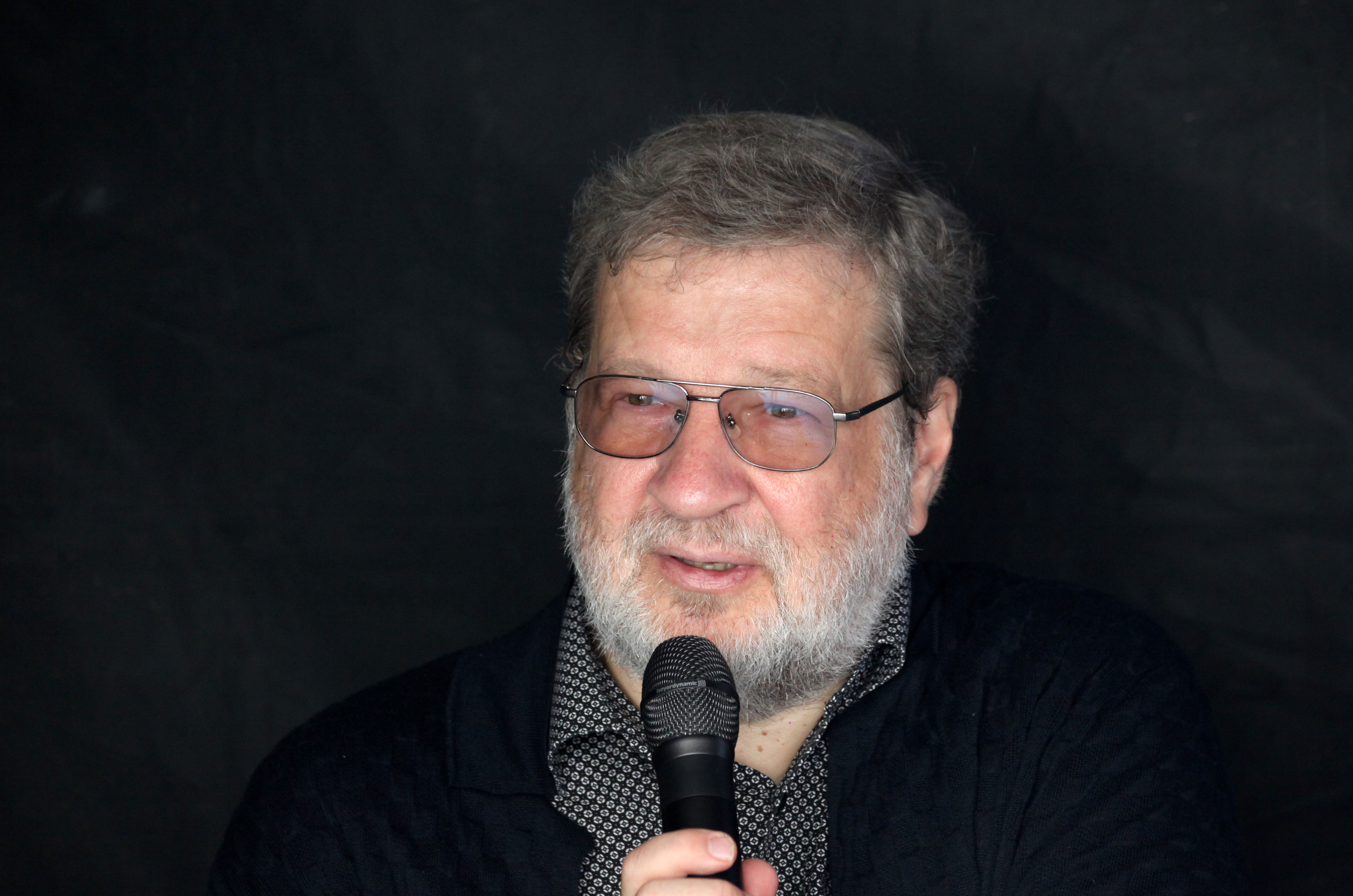
Rein Raud at the annual Literary Street festival 2021 in Tallinn, Estonia

Rein Raud (born 21 December 1961) is an Estonian academic and author.

== Early life ==
He was born in 1961 in the family of Eno Raud and Aino Pervik, both children's authors. He is the eldest of three children. His younger brother Mihkel Raud is a playwright, television personality, singer, guitarist, journalist and member of the Estonian Parliament; his sister Piret Raud is an artist and translator. He is the grandson of playwright, poet and writer Mart Raud.

He graduated from the Leningrad State University (now called Saint Petersburg State University) in 1985 in Japanese studies and earned a PhD degree in literary theory at the University of Helsinki in 1994.

== Career ==
Raud has honorary doctorates from the University of Latvia and the Vytautas Magnus University.

Raud has worked in the Estonian Institute of Humanities (now a part of Tallinn University) and the University of Helsinki, where he served as a professor in the Department of World Cultures till 2016. From 2006 to 2011 Raud served as the first rector of Tallinn University. From 2011 to 2014 he was the President of the European Association for Japanese Studies. Currently he is a research professor at the School of Humanities, Tallinn University.

As a scholar, Raud has published on a wide range of subjects from cultural theory to pre-modern Japanese literature and philosophy, both in English and Estonian. His theoretical project combines the cultural semiotics of the Eco and Lotman traditions with anthropological and sociological approaches (particularly those of Bourdieu and Alexander) in order to achieve a more holistic understanding of cultural phenomena. His work on Japan has dealt with some of the most important philosophical thinkers, notably Dōgen and Nishida Kitarō.

As an author, Raud has published five collections of poetry, seven novels and several collections of short stories and plays. He has received the Estonian Cultural Endowment Annual Prize for Hektor and Bernard (2004) and The Reconstruction (2012) as well as the Vilde Prize for Vend (Brother, 2008). The Reconstruction, The Brother and The Death of the Perfect Sentence, his latest novel to date, have been published in English.

Raud has also frequently contributed to the Estonian public debate by opinion pieces, essays and critical newspaper columns, in which he has expressed left-liberal views and criticised nationalist attitudes. In 2003, he received the prize of the Estonian Journalists' Union for a series of articles criticising the American invasion of Iraq and the Estonian support to it. In 2003-2004 he hosted a philosophical talk show on the Estonian TV called Vita brevis.

Raud is also well known for his translations of Japanese classical literature into Estonian. These include Süda on ainuke lill (Heart is the Only Flower, anthology of waka poetry, 1994), Hullunud pilv (The Crazy Cloud by Ikkyu, 2010) and Mäetipp järve põhjas (The Mountain Peak on the Bottom of the Lake, anthology of haiku poetry, 2008). He has also translated Dante Alighieri's Vita Nova into Estonian.

Raud has been awarded the Order of the Rising Sun, 2nd Class, Gold and Silver Star (Japan, 2011), the Order of the White Star, 3rd Class (Estonia, 2001) and the Commander's Cross for services to Lithuania (2009).

== Cognitive adequacy ==
Cognitive adequacy is a term proposed by Rein Raud as a standard of judging cultural phenomena. According to this method, a cultural phenomenon is cognitively adequate if it provides the means of solving certain problems in a certain socio-cultural context. This is true even when that solution is, according to other criteria, wrong. For example, before the Great Depression in the US many people thought that it is cognitively adequate to think of getting rich quickly through land speculation. All cultural phenomena are replaced by others when they are no longer cognitively adequate. For example, when a community has embraced a new religion, or when science has displaced religion as the primary explanatory discourse for their world.

== Bibliography (academic works) ==
- Raud, Rein (2021): Being in Flux: A Post-Anthropocentric Ontology of the Self. Cambridge: Polity Press.
- Raud, Rein (2016): Meaning in Action: Outline of an Integral Theory of Culture. Cambridge: Polity Press.
- Raud, Rein and Zygmunt Bauman (2015): Practices of Selfhood. Cambridge: Polity Press.
- Raud, Rein (2013): Mis on kultuur? [What is Culture?] Tallinn: Tallinn University Press.
- Raud, Rein and James W. Heisig, eds. (2010): Classical Japanese Philosophy. (Frontiers of Japanese Philosophy Series, vol.7) Nagoya: Nanzan Institute of Religion and Culture.
- Raud, Rein, ed. (2007): Japan and Asian Modernities. London: Kegan Paul.
- Raud, Rein and Mikko Lagerspetz (1997): Cultural Policy in Estonia. Strasbourg: Council of Europe.
- Raud, Rein (1994): The Role of Poetry in Classical Japanese Literature: A Code and Discursivity Analysis. Tallinn: Eesti Humanitaarinstituut.
