= Eno Raud =

Estonian children's writer (1928–1996)

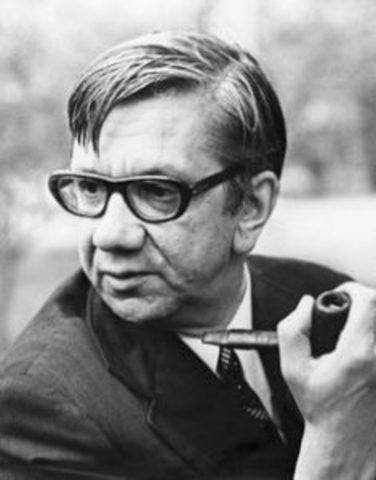
- Born: 15 February 1928; Tartu, Estonia
- Died: 10 July 1996 (aged 68); Haapsalu, Estonia
- Education: University of Tartu
- Occupation: Children's author
- Spouse: Aino Pervik (m. 1961)
- Children: Rein Raud; Mihkel Raud; Piret Raud
- Writing career
- Period: 1957–1997

Eno Raud (15 February 1928 – 10 July 1996) was an Estonian children's writer. His works are considered classics in Estonia as well as in the other former Soviet countries. Raud was included in International Board on Books for Young People (IBBY) Honour List in 1974.

== Early life and career ==
Raud was born in Tartu to writer Mart Raud and Lea Raud. He studied Estonian language and literature at the University of Tartu in 1952. From 1952 to 1956 he worked in the National Library of Estonia, from 1956 to 1965 in the Estonian State Publishing House. After that he retired and devoted himself to writing. He died in Haapsalu, aged 68.

Raud penned more than 50 books of stories and poems over his lifetime. His most popular works include Three Jolly Fellows, A Story with Flying Saucers, The Gothamites and Raggie. The author's children's books have been translated into more than 30 languages.

== Personal life ==
Raud was married to writer Aino Pervik; their children are scholar and author Rein Raud, musician and writer Mihkel Raud and children's writer and illustrator Piret Raud.

== Bibliography ==
Selected Estonian titles in chronological order

- Sipsik (Raggie), 1962
- Kilplased (The Gothamites), 1962
- Tuli pimendatud linnas (A Light in a Darkened City), 1967
- Päris kriminaalne lugu (A Quite Criminal Tale), 1968
- Lugu lendavate taldrikutega (A Story with Flying Saucers), 1969
- Telepaatiline lugu (A Telepathic Tale), 1970
- Naksitrallid (Three Jolly Fellows. 1–2), 1972
- Jälle need Naksitrallid (Three Jolly Fellows. 3–4), 1979

== Translations ==
Selected translations

Raggie

- Lithuanian: Cypliukas, Gimtasis Žodis 2006
- Russian: Сипсик, Tammerraamat 2010, 2012, 2015
- Russian: Сипсик, Детская литература 1979, 1980, РОСМЭН 2013

A Story with Flying Saucers

- Hungarian: A repülő csészealjak története, Móra 1985
- Greek: Kedros, 1982, 1984
- Azerbaijani: "Uçan boşqab"ların əhvalatı, Gənclik 1982
- Slovak: Lietajúce taniere, Pravda 1981
- Romanian/Moldova: О историе ку „фарфурий збурэтоаре”, Литература артистикэ 1980
- Bulgarian: История с „летящи чинии”, Народна младеж 1978
- Latvian: Lidojošie šķīvji, Liesma 1977
- German: Die Geschichte mit den fliegenden Untertassen, Eesti Raamat 1976, Perioodika 1978
- Russian: История с „летающими тарелками”, Детская литературa 1977
- Finnish: Lentävän lautasen arvoitus, WSOY 1975

The Gothamites

- English: The Gothamites, Brooklyn, NY: Elsewhere Editions 2019

Three Jolly Fellows, books 1–4

- Russian: Муфта, Полботинка и Моховая Борода, newest ed. НИГМА 2015
- Latvian: Naksitrallīši (Books 1–2), Zvaigzne ABC 2010
- German: Drei lustige Gesellen, Leiv 2009–2012
- Lithuanian: Pabaldukai (Books 1–2), Vaga 1998
- Romanian/Moldova: Маншон, Жумагятэ ши Барбэ де Мушкь, Литература Артистикэ, 1985.

== Awards ==
- 1970: All-Union Children's and Youth Literature Competition, 1st prize (Fire in a Darkened City)
- 1970: Annual Prize of Literature of the Estonian SSR (The Inquisitive Film Camera, A Story with Flying Saucers)
- 1974: IBBY Honour List (Three Jolly Fellows. 1)
- 1978: Honored Writer of the Estonian SSR
- 1980: Annual J. Smuul Award for Literature (Three Jolly Fellows. 1)
- 1987: Estonian State Prize (Three Jolly Fellows. 1–4)
- 1996: Karl Eduard Sööt Children's Poetry Award (posthumously) (A Fish Takes a Walk)
