= Reed Morn =

Estonian writer

Reed Morn (real name Frieda Johanna Drewerk; 19 August 1898, Tallinn – 17 October 1978, Los Angeles) was an Estonian writer.

In 1924, she graduated from the University of Tartu. After 1932, she remained a freelancer. In 1944, she escaped to Germany. In 1952, she moved to New York and in 1957 to Los Angeles.

== Works ==
- 1927: Andekas parasiit (The Talented Parasite), novel
- 1927: Kastreerit elu (Castrated Life), novel
- 1929: "Prints" (Prince), short story
- 1956: Tee ja tõde (Path and Truth), novel
