= Piret Raud =

Estonian writer and painter

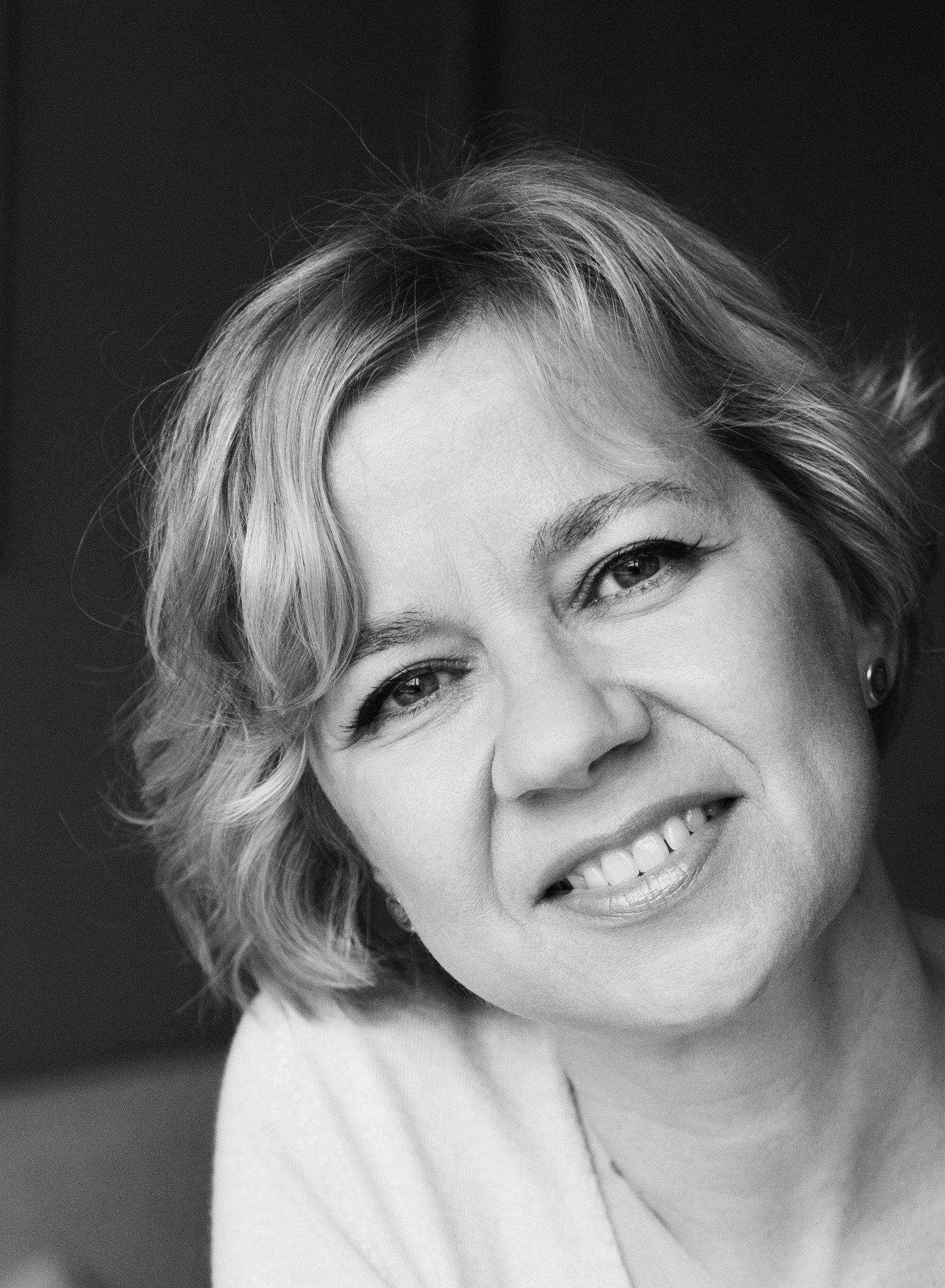
- Raud in 2021
- Born: 15 July 1971 (age 55); Tallinn, then part of Estonian SSR, Soviet Union
- Occupations: Author, illustrator
- Writing career
- Genre: Children's books
- Notable awards: Friedebert Tuglas short story award (2022)
- Website: piretraud.ee

Piret Raud (born 15 July 1971) is an Estonian author and illustrator.

== Biography ==
Raud was born on 15 July 1971. She is the daughter of Estonian children's authors Eno Raud and Aino Pervik. Her brothers are scholar and author Rein Raud and musician and writer Mihkel Raud.

She graduated from the Estonian Academy of Arts in printmaking, and initially set off on the same path.

After trying her hand at writing, Raud has since become the most renowned and widely translated children's author in Estonia. She has written about 20 titles, has been translated into 14 different languages, and has illustrated more than 50 titles.

Since 2018, she has mainly been writing for older audiences. To date, Raud has published 3 novels and a short story collection. Her fiction has been well received: she has received the A. H. Tammsaare Literary Award (2020) for her novel Verihurmade aed (The Garden of Devil's Milks), been nominated for the Estonian Cultural Endowment Annual Award for Literature (2021) for Kaotatud sõrmed (Lost Fingers) and most recently won the prestigious Friedebert Tuglas Short Story Award (2022) for her short story Pink (The Bench).

== Selected works ==
Fiction

- Initsiaal purjeka ja papagoiga (The Initial with Ship and Parakeet), Tänapäev, 2018 (novel) ISBN 9789949853816
- Verihurmade aed (The Garden of Devil's Milks), Tänapäev, 2019 (novel) ISBN 9789949856206
- Kaotatud sõrmed (Lost Fingers), Tänapäev, 2020 (short story collection)
- Portselanist Nael (The Porcelain Nail), Tänapäev, 2021 (novel) ISBN 9789916170977
- Nimepanija (The Namer), Tänapäev, 2022 (short story collection)

Children's books

- Kataleena isemoodi juuksed (Kataleena's Peculiar Hair), Sinisukk 1995
- Ernesto küülikud (Ernesto's Rabbits), Tänapäev 2004
- Sanna ja salakütid (Sanna and the Poachers), Tänapäev 2005
- Printsess Luluu ja härra Kere (Princess Lulu and Mr. Bones), Tänapäev 2008
- Härra Linnu lugu (Mister Bird's Story), Tammerraamat 2009
- Tobias ja teine B (Tobias, Second Grade), Mustvalge 2010
- Emma roosad asjad (Emma Loves Pink), Tammerraamat 2010 + digital book in English, Japanese and Estonian for iPad, iPhone and iPod Touch, 2010
- Natuke napakad lood (Slightly Silly Stories), Tänapäev 2012
- Kolm soovi (Three Wishes), Tänapäev 2012
- Teistmoodi printsessilood (Princesses with a Twist), Tänapäev 2013
- Roosi tahab lennata (Rosie Wants to Fly), Mustvalge Kirjastus 2013
- Mina, emme ja meie igasugused sõbrad (Me, Mum, and Our Friends of All Sorts), Tänapäev 2014
- Lugu Sandrist, Murist, tillukesest emmest ja nähtamatust Akslist (The Story of Sander, Muri, the Eensy Mum, and the Invisible Aksel), Tänapäev 2015
- Kõik võiks olla roosa! (Everything Could Be Pink!), Tammerraamat 2015
- Emili ja oi kui palju asju (Emily and a Whole Bunch of Things), Tänapäev 2015
- Trööömmmpffff ehk Eli hääl (Trööömmmpffff, or Eli's Voice), Tänapäev 2016
- Kõik minu sugulased (All My Relatives), Tänapäev 2017
- Lugu väikesest majast, kes tahtis olla kodu (The Story of the Little House Who Wanted to Be a Home), Tänapäev 2018
- Kõrv (The Ear), Tänapäev 2019

== Translations ==
Albanian

- Princeshat e Estonisë, Shkupi 2015

English

- Mister Bird's Story, Tammerraamat 2009
- The Ear, Thames & Hudson 2019

French

- Monsieur Oiseau veut changer de peau, Éditions Le Pommier 2012
- Sa majesté Ver-de-Terre et autres folles princesses, Rouergue 2013
- Le thé des poisons et autres histoires, Rouergue 2013
- Princesse Lulu et Monsieur Nonosse, Rouergue 2014
- Emily et tout un tas de choses, Rouergue 2015
- Voisins zinzins et autres histoires de mon immeuble, Rouergue 2015
- Trööömmmpffff ou la voix d’Elie, Rouergue 2016
- Au secours! Maman rétrécit, Rouergue 2017
- L’histoire de la petite maison qui recherchait des habitants, Rouergue 2017

German

- Die Geschichte vom Herrn Vogel, Leiv 2010

Hungarian

- Tóbiás és a 2/b, Pongrác Kiadó 2014

Italian

- Voglio tutto rosa, Sinnos 2014
- La principessa e lo scheletro, Sinnos 2015
- Micromamma, Sinnos 2018
- Trööömmmpffff o la voce di Eli, EDB Edizioni Dehoniane 2018
- Emily e un mare di cose, EDB Edizioni Dehoniane 2019

Japanese

- みっつのねがい, Fukuinkan Shoten Publishers 2012
- ピンクだいすき!, Fukuinkan Shoten Publishers 2014

Korean

- 엄마가 작아졌어요, Better Books 2019

Latvian

- Princess Skella un Leta kungs, Liels un mazs 2011
- Berts un otrā B, Liels un mazs 2013
- Princese pa pastu, Liels un mazs 2016

Lithuanian

- Pono Paukščio istorija, Sofoklis 2013
- Princesė Lulu ir ponas Skeletonas, Dominicus Lituanus 2015
- Šiek tiek paikos istorijos, 700 eilučių 2018

Polish

- Księżniczki nieco zakręcone, Finebooks 2015
- Historie trochę szalone, Finebooks 2015
- Ja, mama i nasi zwariowani przyjaciele, Finebooks 2019

Russian

- Эрнесто и его кролики, Aleksandra 2012
- Чудные истории, Aleksandra 2014
- Тобиас и второй "Б", Koolibri 2018

Slovenian

- Prismuknjene zgodbe, Sodobnost 2019

Spanish

- La curiosa historia del senor Pajaro, Libros del Zorro Rojo 2011

== Awards and honors ==
- 2004: Children's Story competition "My First Book", 1st place (Ernesto's Rabbits)
- 2005: Annual Children's Literature Award of the Cultural Endowment of Estonia (Sanna and the Poachers)
- 2008: Annual Children's Literature Award of the Cultural Endowment of Estonia (Princess Lulu and Mr. Bones)
- 2009: Estonian Children's Literature Centre Raisin of the Year Award (Mister Bird's Story)
- 2010: The White Ravens (Mister Bird's Story)
- 2011: Children's and Young Adult Jury (Bērnu un jauniešu žūrija), Latvia, 1st place (Grades 3–4) (Princess Lulu and Mr. Bones)
- 2012: IBBY Honour List (Princess Lulu and Mr. Bones)
- 2013: The White Ravens (Three Wishes)
- 2014: "Järje Hoidja" Award of the Tallinn Central Library (Princesses with a Twist)
- 2015: Lire ici et là (Slightly Silly Stories)
- 2015: Annual Children's Literature Award of the Cultural Endowment of Estonia (The Story of Sander, Muri, Eensy Mum, and the Invisible Aksel)
- 2016: Hans Christian Andersen Award nominee
- 2016: Order of the White Star, IV Class
- 2014–2017: Astrid Lindgren Memorial Award candidate
- 2020 A. H. Tammsaare Literary Award (The Garden of Devil's Milks)
- 2021 Shortlisted for the Cultural Endowment Annual Award for Literature, Best Book of Fiction (Lost Fingers)
- 2022 Friedebert Tuglas short story award (The Bench)
