= Eia Uus =

Estonian writer

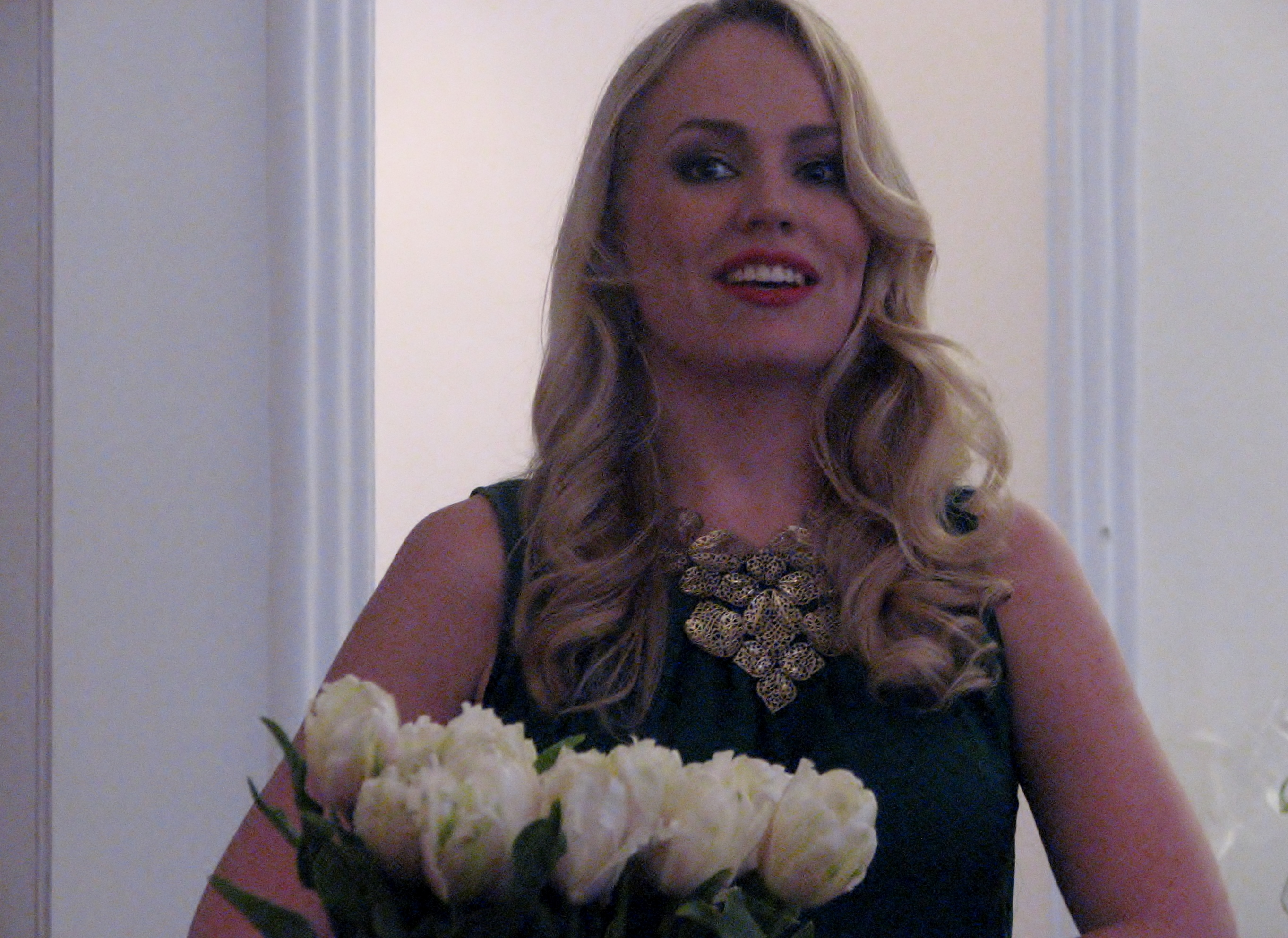
Eia Uus

Eia Uus (born in 1985 in Haapsalu) is an Estonian writer.

She graduated from Tallinn University in Estonian language and literature.

Since 2019, she has been a member of Estonian Writers' Union.

== Awards ==
- 2005: Eduard Vilde Prize

== Works ==
- novel Kuu külm kuma ('The Moon's Cold Glow') (2005)
- novel Kahe näoga jumal (2008)
- Minu Prantsusmaa (2013)
- Aasta Pariisis (2014)
- Seitsme maa ja mere taha (2019)
- Tüdrukune ('What It Feels Like for a Girl') (2019)
