= Roud (disambiguation) =

The Roud Folk Song Index is a database of English-language folk songs.

Roud may also refer to:

== Places ==
- Roud, Isle of Wight, a hamlet in England

== People ==
- Gustave Roud (1897–1976), Swiss poet and photographer
- Richard Roud (1929–1989), American writer on film
- Steve Roud, creator of the Roud Folk Song Index
