= Lümanda =

Village in Estonia

Coordinates: 58°17′N 22°02′E

- Village
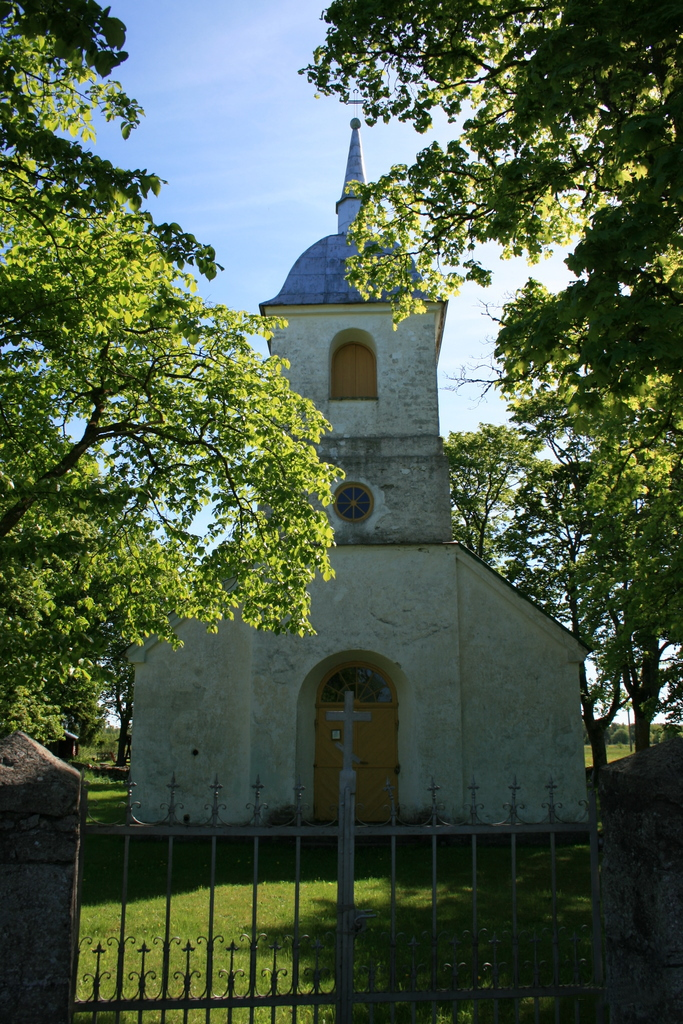
- Transfiguration Of Our Lord Estonian Apostolic Orthodox Church
- Interactive map of Lümanda
- Country: Estonia
- County: Saare County
- Parish: Saaremaa Parish
- Time zone: UTC+2 (EET)
  - Summer (DST): UTC+3 (EEST)

Lümanda is a village in Saaremaa Parish, Saare County in western Estonia.

Before 2015, Lümanda was the administrative centre of Lümanda Parish.

Before the administrative reform in 2017, the village was in Lääne-Saare Parish.

== Gallery ==
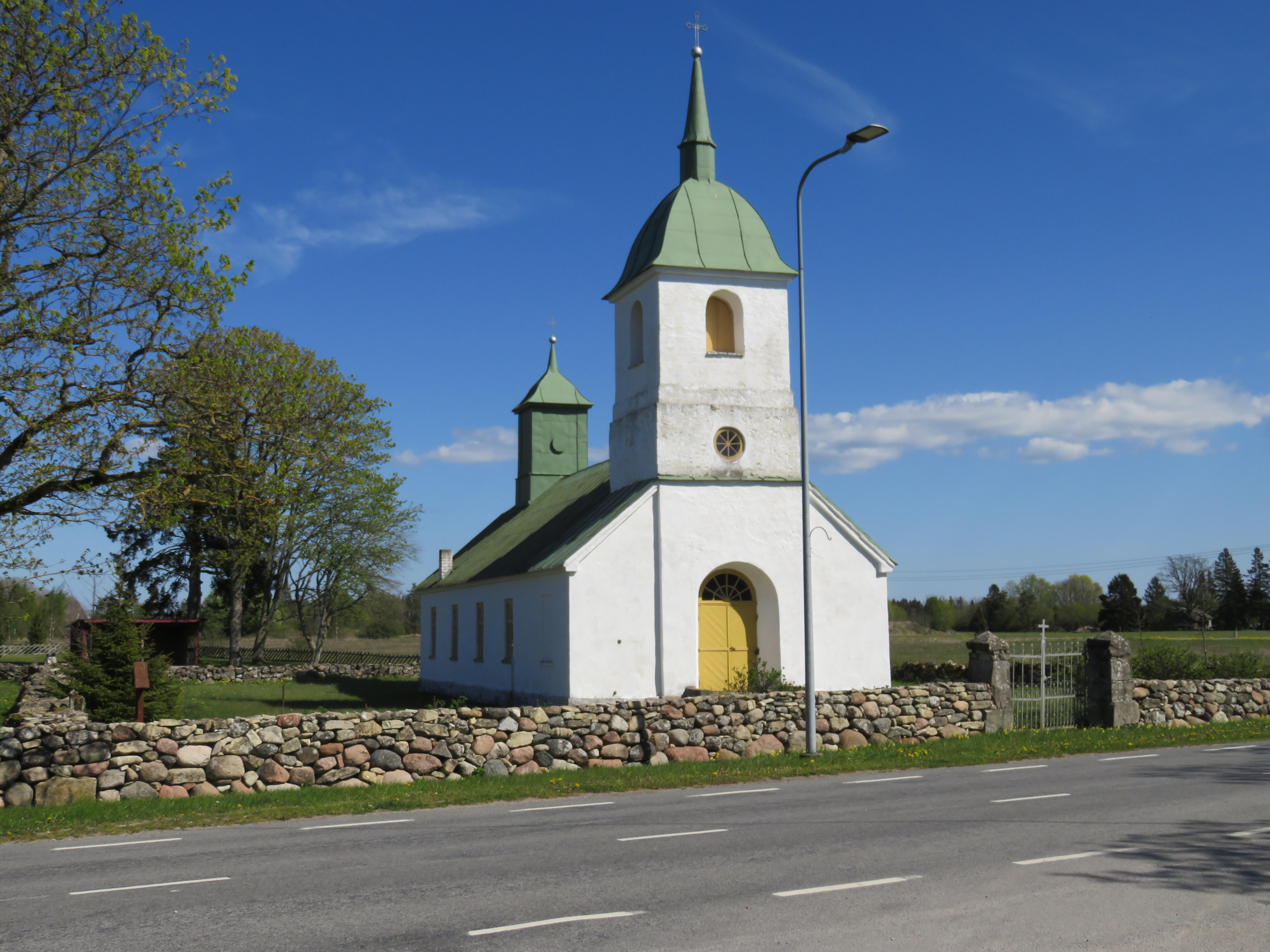
The Transfiguration Of Our Lord Estonian Apostolic Orthodox Church in Lümanda.
