= Yelena Skulskaya =

Estonian journalist and writer

- Jelena Skulskaja, Еле́на Григо́рьевна Ску́льская
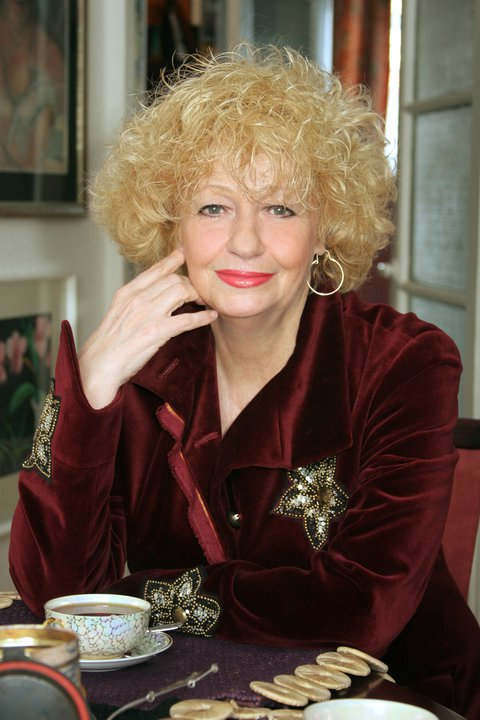
- Yelena Skulskaya in 2005
- Born: 8 August 1950 (age 76); Tallinn, Estonian SSR
- Education: Tartu State University
- Occupations: Journalist, translator, writer

Yelena Skulskaya (Estonian: Jelena Skulskaja, Russian: Еле́на Григо́рьевна Ску́льская; born 8 August 1950) is an Estonian journalist, translator and writer who mainly writes in the Russian language.

She was born in Tallinn. In 1974 she graduated from Tartu State University in Russian philology.

1974–1997 she worked as a cultural editor, critic and reporter at the newspaper Estonija (Russian: Эcmoния). 1996–2008 she worked at Russian Theatre.

Since 1991 she is a member of Estonian Writers' Union.

In 2011 she was awarded with Order of the White Star, IV class.
