= Debora Vaarandi =

Estonian writer

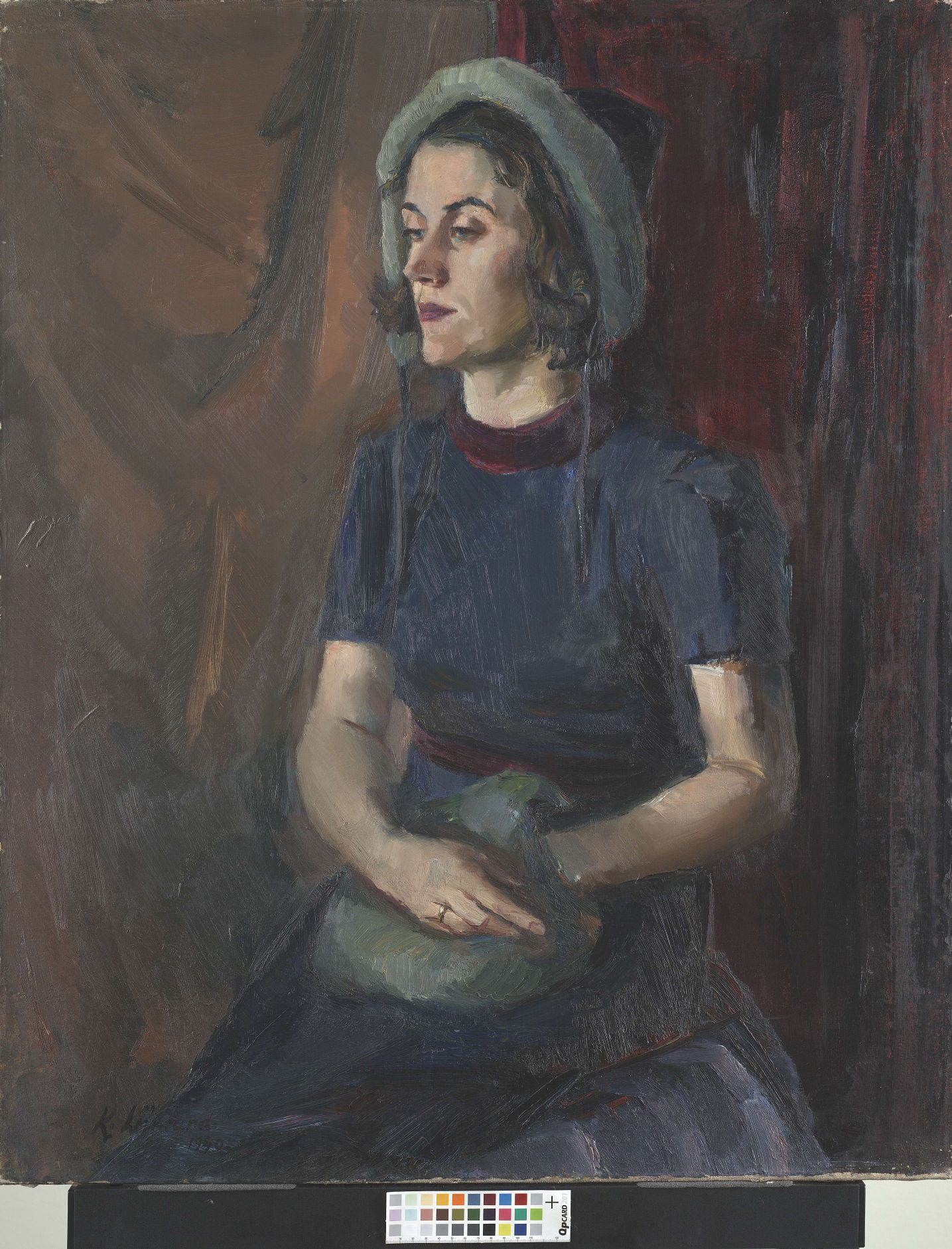
- Portrait of Debora Vaarandi, by Kaarel Liimand (1940)
- Born: Debora Trull; 1 October 1916; Võru, Russian Empire
- Died: 28 April 2007 (aged 90); Tallinn, Estonia
- Education: University of Tartu
- Occupation: Writer
- Spouse(s): Aadu Hint, Juhan Smuul
- Writing career
- Notable work: Põleva laotuse all
- Notable awards: Order of the White Rose of Finland

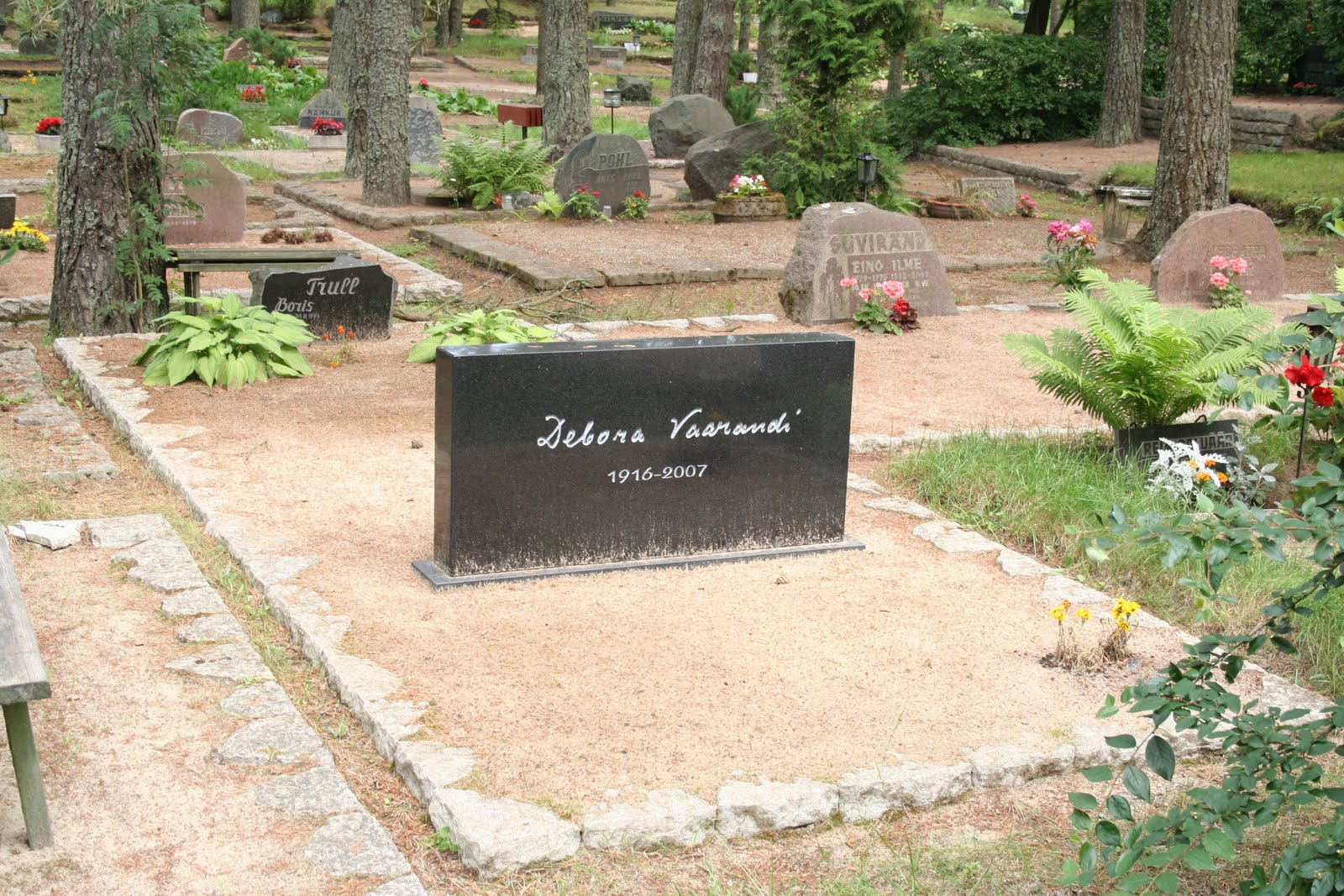
Vaarandi's grave in Pärnamäe Cemetery

Debora Vaarandi (born Debora Trull; 1 October 1916 – 28 April 2007) was an Estonian writer, considered to be a leading literary figure in post–World War II Estonia. Many of her poems were set to music. Vaarandi was a recipient of the first Juhan Liiv Poetry Award, and was recognized with the Cultural Award of the Republic of Estonia for outstanding lifetime achievement.

== Biography ==
Debora Vaarandi was born in Võru on 1 October 1916 to Julianus and Tamara Trull (née Ella). She grew up on the island of Saaremaa. Vaarandi studied language and literature at the University of Tartu.

In 1936, she married Aadu Hint; the couple later divorced. She joined the Communist Party of Estonia in 1940. When the Germans invaded Estonia, she escaped to Russia, returning to Estonia in 1944. Although not trained as a journalist, she worked as editor in chief of the communist newspaper Sirp ja Vasar. She was forced to resign from that post after contracting tuberculosis.

In 1946, her first collection of poetry Põleva laotuse all ("Under a Blazing Sky") was published. Her work celebrates values such as the love of nature, the importance of family and the beauty of small things. Many of her poems have been set to music.

In 1952, she married the writer Juhan Smuul. After 1977, she focused on translating works by Anna Akhmatova, Georg Trakl, and Edith Södergran into Estonian. She was awarded the Order of the White Rose of Finland for translating Finnish poetry into Estonian.

== Awards and honors ==
- 1965, she received the first Juhan Liiv Poetry Award
- 2005, she was recognized with the Cultural Award of the Republic of Estonia for outstanding lifetime achievement.

== Selected works ==
- Unistaja aknal ("The Dreamer at the Window") (1959)
- Tuule valgel ("In the Light of the Wind") (1977)
