= Piret Bristol =

Estonian writer (born 1968)

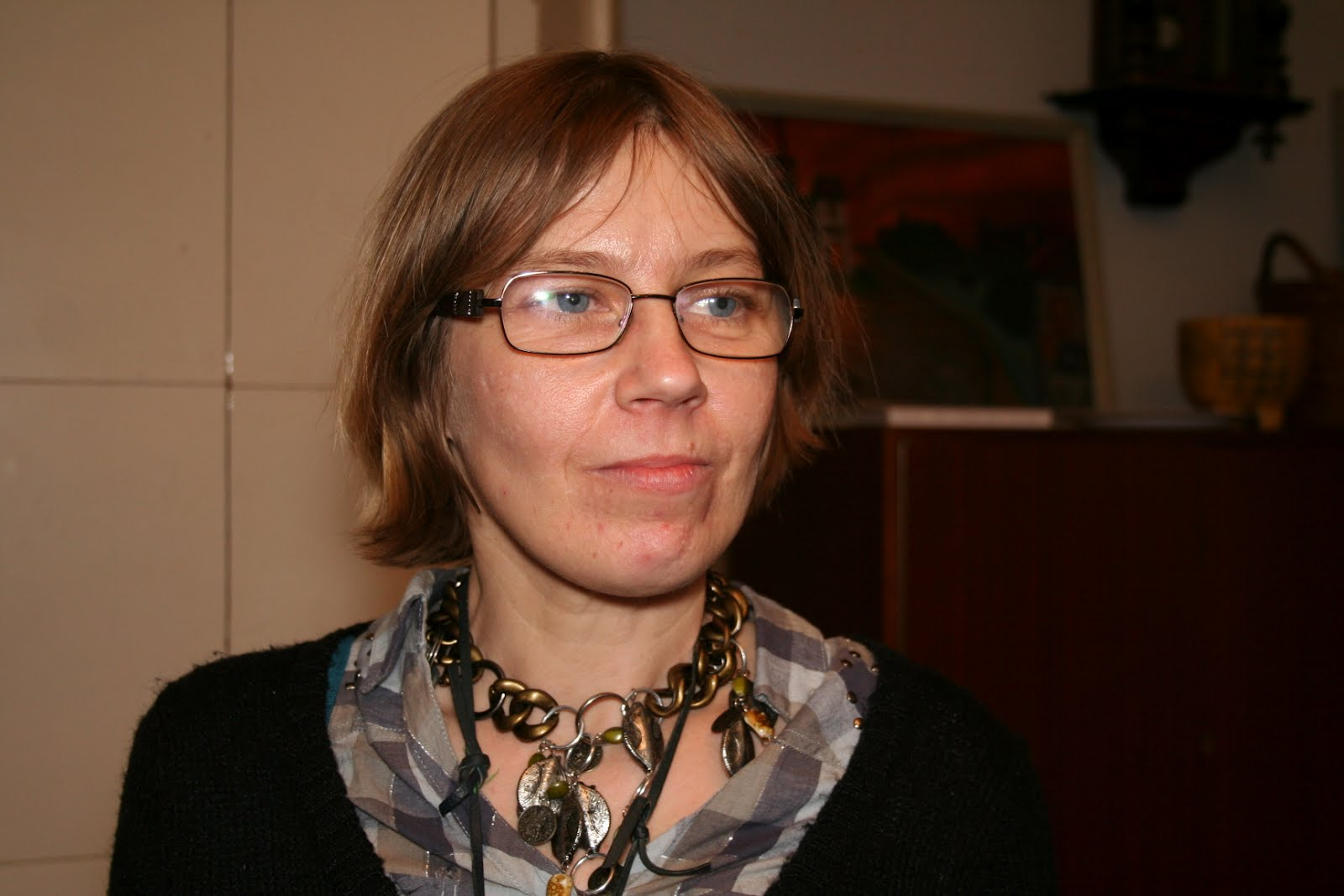
Piret Bristol (2012)

Piret Bristol (born 18 April 1968) is an Estonian poet, prosaist, and novelist.

== Education and career ==
From 1986 to 2001, she studied Estonian literature in Tartu University.

From 1996 to 2007, she was a freelance writer. From 2007 to 2011, she was a copy editor for the newspaper Postimees. From 2011 to 2014, she was the head of the Tartu branch of the Estonian Writers' Union.

== Selected works ==
- 1996 short story "Turvamehed" ('Security Guards')
- 2007 prose collection "Paralleelmeri" ('Parallel Sea')
- 2011-2013 three-part novel series "Maailm, mis on hea" ('A World That Is Good')
