= Mihkel Raud =

Estonian writer, TV personality, guitarist and journalist

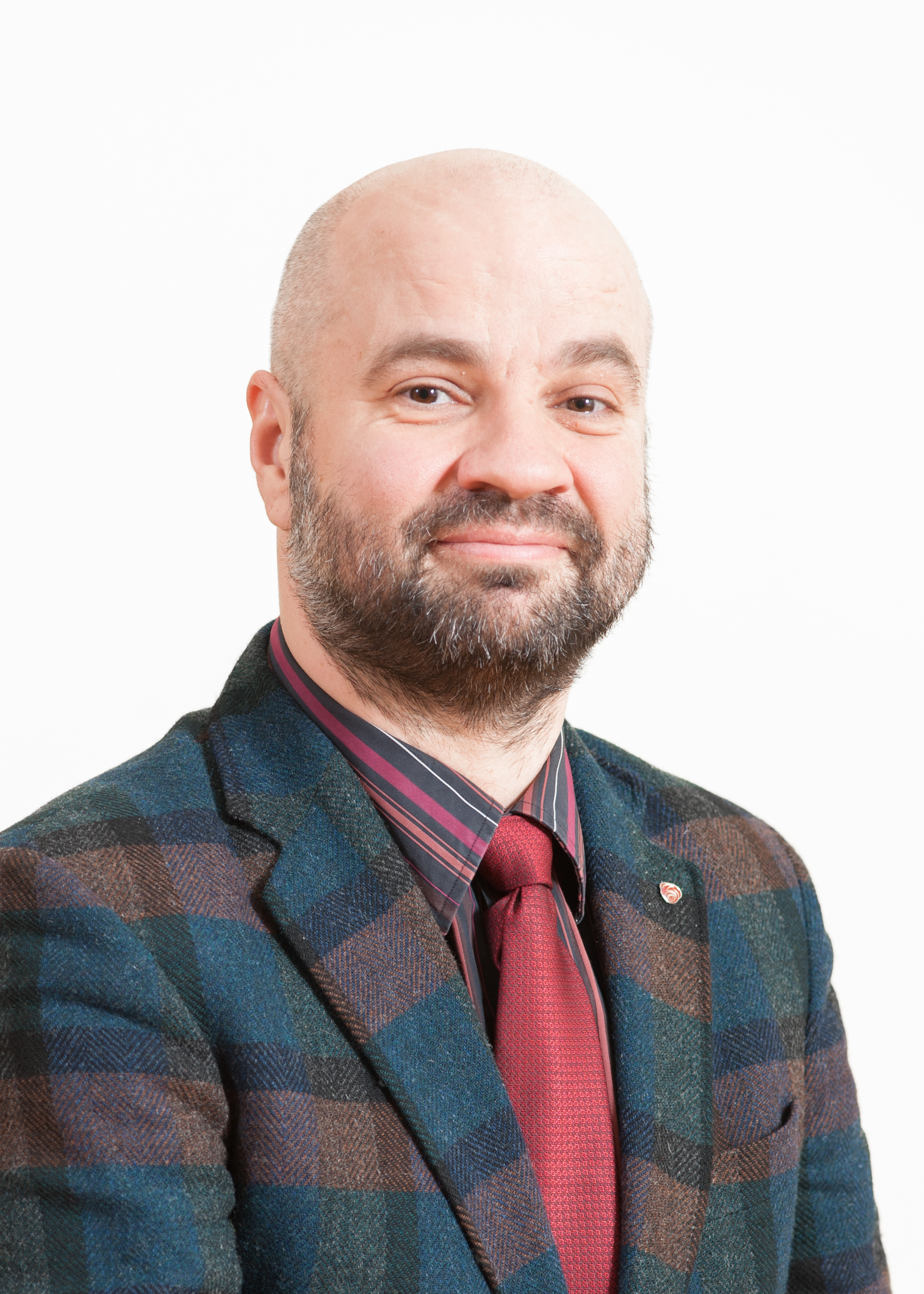
- Born: 18 January 1969 (age 57); Tallinn, then part of Estonian SSR, Soviet Union
- Occupations: Writer, music artist
- Website: mihkelraud.ee

Mihkel Raud (born 18 January 1969) is an Estonian writer, music artist, actor, and a former member of the Estonian parliament. He is best known for his book Musta pori näkku and as a former host of an Estonian talk show on TV3.

== Personal life ==
Mihkel Raud was born the middle of three siblings to children's authors Eno Raud and Aino Raud (née Pervik). His grandfather was playwright, poet and writer Mart Raud. His older brother is scholar and author Rein Raud and his younger sister is artist Piret Raud.

== Career ==
Mihkel Raud began his career as a child actor. In 1981, he played the role of Tõnn in the Helle Murdmaa-directed musical-family feature film Nukitsamees, based on the 1920 children's story of the same name by Oskar Luts. The same year, he appeared as Riho in the Raivo Trass-directed television film Keskpäev, based on the 1972 trilogy Lugu lendavate taldrikutega penned by his father.

In addition to his interest in literature and music, Raud was a member in 2015, of the Cultural Affairs Committee and European Union Affairs Committee of Riigikogu, the Estonian parliament. On 7 June 2016, Raud announced that he would leave politics and focus on his TV3 talkshow. Raud was also host of the Estonian TV show Seitse Vaprat aired on Eesti Televisioon, the local weekly talk show on TV3, a contributor to the local radio industry and member of the Board of the Estonian Public Broadcasting. Recently, he has been member of the jury of Eesti otsib superstaari, a local version of Pop Idol.

=== Writing ===
During his career, Raud published How To Build A Music Web Site That Sells in 2003 and later in 2008, an autobiography titled Musta pori näkku (Black Dirt in Your Face). Then, in 2010, he wrote a novel titled Sinine on sinu taevas (Blue is Your Sky). Later in 2012, Raud wrote a stage play titled American Monkey performed worldwide including in the United States, Finland and Russia.

=== Music ===
Raud is best known in Estonia as a musician who played as a guitarist, a singer-songwriter in several local bands including Golem, Metallist, Ba-Bach, Singer Vinger, Mr. Lawrence, and Lenna. In 2002, he produced a medieval Black Sabbath tribute album Sabbatum, a collection of classic Sabbath tracks performed in Latin by medieval music band Rondellus.
