= Estonian Children's Literature Centre =

Institution in Tallinn

Coordinates: 59°26′32″N 24°44′56″E

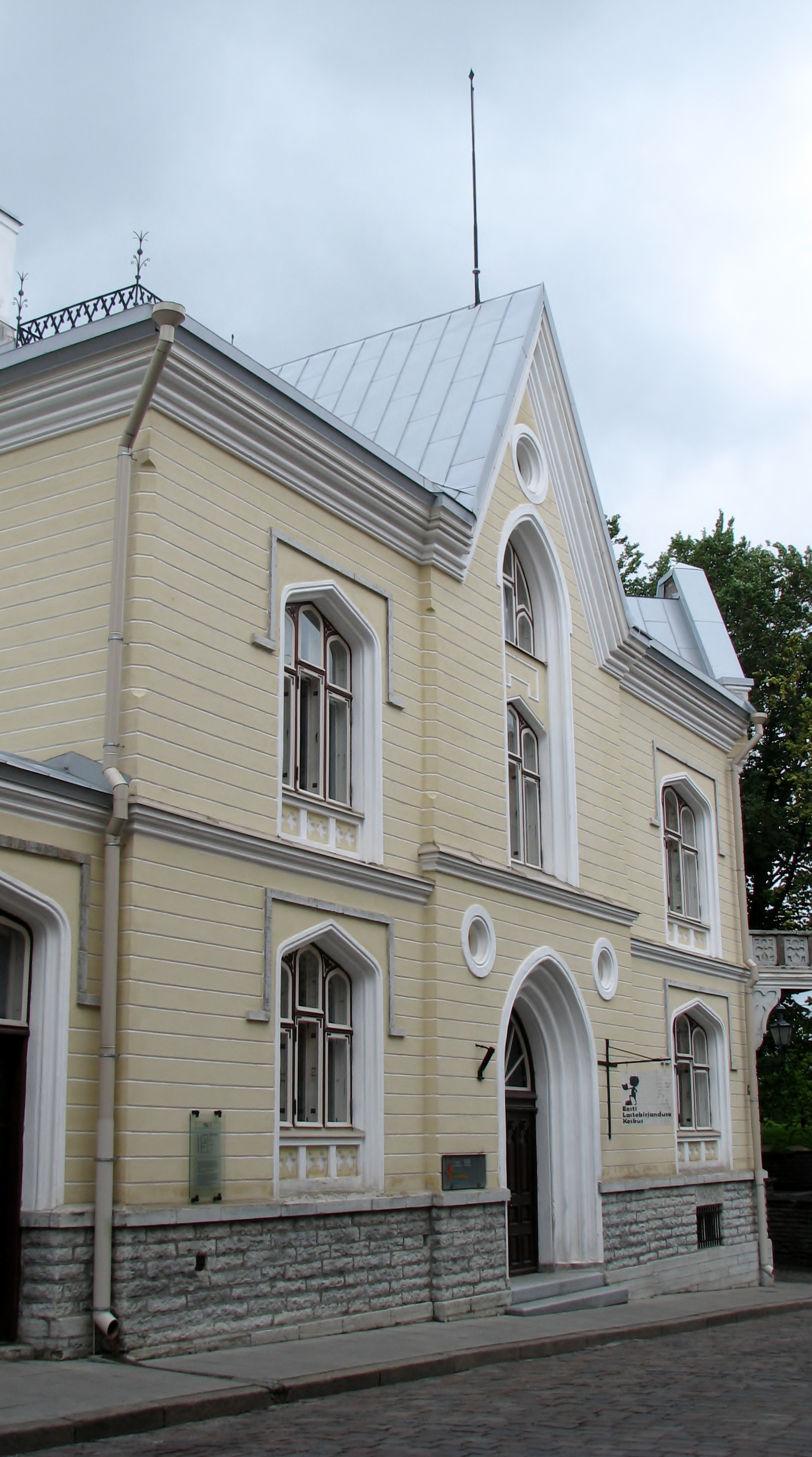
Estonian Children's Literature Centre

The Estonian Children's Literature Centre (in Estonian: Eesti Lastekirjanduse Keskus) is a centre devoted to children's literature from Estonia. It is located at Pikk 73 in Tallinn's old town and is open daily for visitors. The history of the centre dates back to 1933.

The mascot of the centre is Nukitsamees (in English: Bumpy), a character in a story by Estonian author Oskar Luts.

The Estonian Children's Literature Centre is a state institution operating within the area of government of the Ministry of Culture and administered by the ministry. The centre was established as the legal successor to the Estonian Children's and Youth Library, which was formed on 1 January 1975 .

The center is open every day to all interested parties, who can visit the children's library, illustration galleries, the treasury of Estonian children's literature, and the Nukitsamehe fairy tale attic located in the building.

The director of the center since 2011 is Triin Soone, before that the center was headed by Anne Rande . The director of the center is responsible for the daily work and strategic management of the center. Her task is also the short- and long-term planning of the center's substantive and economic activities and the implementation of the planned activities.

Main activities of the Children's Literature Center change collects and preserves children's books and magazines in Estonian and published in Estonia, as well as translations of Estonian children's literature. coordinates the cooperation of researchers in children's literature; provides information and consultations to professionals in the field and all interested parties; organizes training courses, conferences and seminars; publishes publications on children's literature; organizes creative competitions and awards children's literature prizes; introduces and mediates children's literature to the public through educational programs, media, and public events; initiates nationwide literature and reading projects; organizes leisure and hobby activities related to literature and books for children; popularizes Estonian children's literature abroad, participates in book fairs; collects and preserves the original work of Estonian illustrators and organizes illustration exhibitions; offers reading material for children up to 16 years old.
