= Margit Adorf =

Estonian journalist and poet

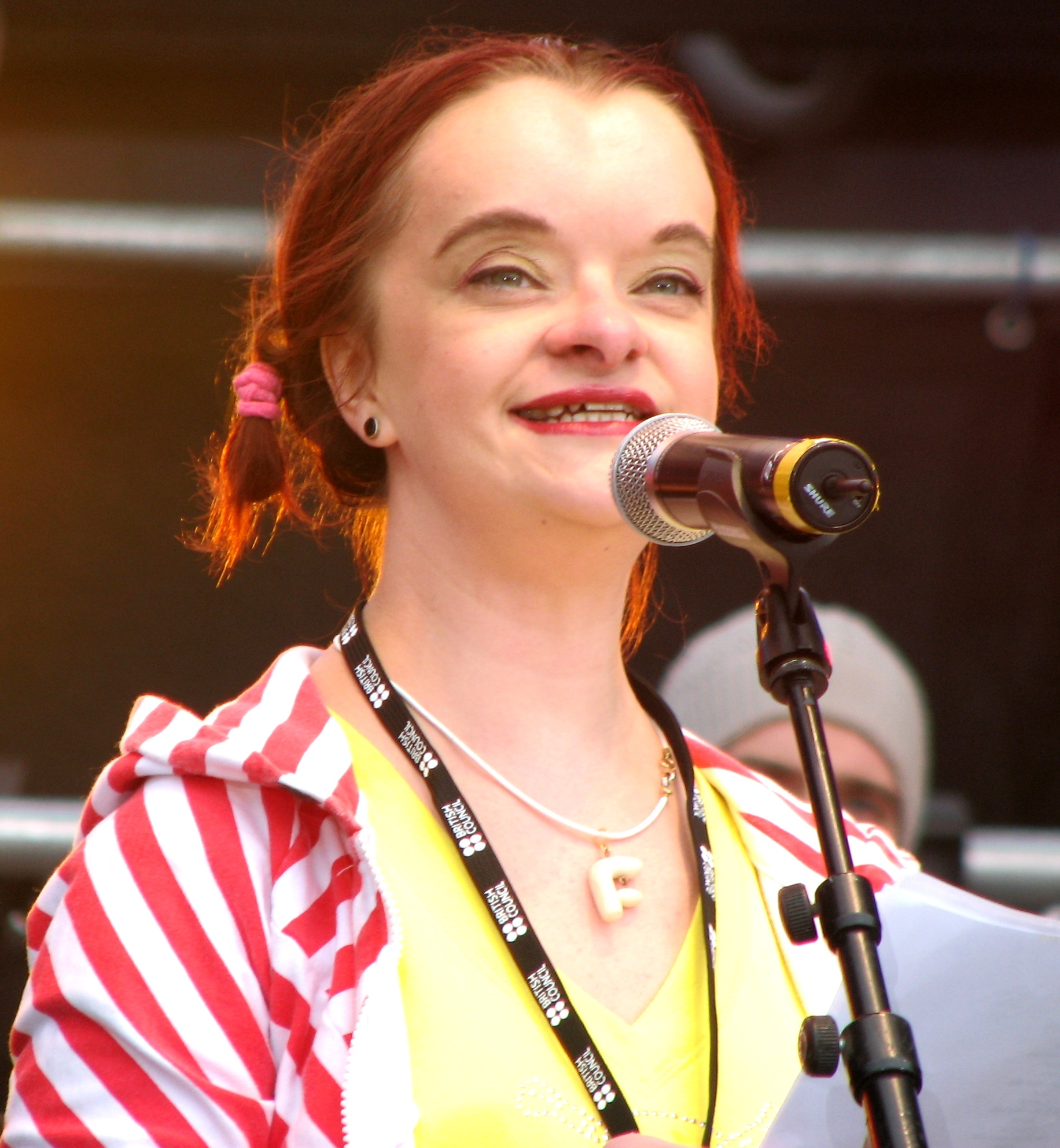
Margit Adorf (2010)

Margit Adorf (pseudonym Fagira D. Morti; born on 14 February 1974 in Tallinn) is an Estonian journalist and poet.

== Works ==
- 1995: poetry collection "Libamaailm"
- 2001: poetry collection "Normaalsuse etalon"
- 2018: poetry collection "Pöörane kiskjaloom"
