= Estonian State Publishing House =

Estonian publishing house

Estonian State Publishing House (Estonian: Eesti Riiklik Kirjastus, abbreviation ERK) was the state publisher of the Estonian SSR between 1949 and 1964. Its headquarters were located in Tallinn. In total, it published about 9000 books and booklets, with a total print run of 80 million.

Its successor is Eesti Raamat.
