= Marinko Sudac Collection =

Avant-garde art collection based in Croatia

The Marinko Sudac Collection, based in Zagreb, Croatia, has been created with a clear collecting strategy based on the region of Central and Eastern Europe, additionally spanning from the Baltic area to the Black Sea. The guiding principle of the Collection is systematic exploration, researching, and promotion of the avant-garde practices which have been marginalized, forbidden, and at times completely negated due to the historical, social and political circumstances. In this context, the Marinko Sudac Collection gives the most complete and comprehensive overview on the art of this region. The Collection starts at 1909, and it show the continuity from the first Avant-Gardes, through neo-avant-garde and New Artistic Practices, ending with the fall of the Berlin Wall. The global uniqueness of the Marinko Sudac Collection is also seen in the kind of media it contains. It contains not only traditional artworks, such as paintings, sculptures, and photographs, but it gives equal importance to documentary and archival material. Great importance is put on these almost forgotten media, which enable research of specific phenomena, artists and the socio-political situation which affected this type of art. The Collection contains a great number of museological units, and it treats the documentary and archival material on the same level as traditional artworks. By examining the units contained in the Marinko Sudac Collection, one can read not only the art scene or the art production of a certain artist, but the full status of the society, the socio-political atmosphere of the region in which this art was created in.

This Collection is not merely a process of gathering artworks, but a contextualisation of the art of region in the global history of art and an effort of putting it on its deserved place in history. The aim of the Marinko Sudac Collection is to preserve the cultural heritage of the Central and Eastern European region from globalisation, by maintaining it in a contextual unity. The end goal is to place the Collection in an architectural, physical building of the Museum of Avant-Garde, in which this art will be valorised, museologically processed, open to researchers and experts, and presented to the public. A part of the works from the Marinko Sudac Collection is available in digital form on an innovative platform of the Virtual Museum of Avant-Garde (www.avantgarde-museum.com/en), which unites the work of the Virtual Museum of the Avant-Garde, the Marinko Sudac Collection, and the Institute for the Research of the Avant-Garde, with a goal to form a central database for the researching of the phenomena of the Avant-Garde. The Marinko Sudac Foundation was established in 2022.

Alongside more than 170 already accomplished successful collaborations with museum institutions and independently organized exhibition in great museum centres such as Tate Modern, London; Ludwig Museum, Budapest, Haus der Kunst, Munich; ZKM, Karlsruhe, Deutsches Filmmuseum Frankfurt, Museum of Modern Art, Warsaw, Museum of Contemporary Art, Zagreb,... or exhibitions of the Collection in unofficial places such as Marshall Josip Broz Tito's boat Seagull (At Standstill exhibition, Rijeka, 2011), Marinko Sudac is also an editor of numerous publications – art monographs, exhibition catalogues and collections of texts, and an author of a successful artist residence project Artist on Vacation, held annually since 2012, which hosted over 90 of the leading world artists which continue the tradition of the Avant-Garde.

== Collection strategy ==
The Collection's interest extends from the Baltic area to the Black Sea, with particular emphasis on Central and Eastern Europe. The collector's strategy is directed towards systematic exploration, research, and promotion of Avant-Garde practices that have been marginalized, forbidden, and at times completely rejected, due to historical, social and political circumstances. In this respect, the Collection is, in relation to already existing European art collections, regionally cohesive, and presents an inexhaustible resource for the research of Avant-Garde art and a dynamic platform for the exchange of knowledge on the phenomenon of Avant-Garde. This can be seen in numerous topical and retrospective exhibitions, organised events, followed by connected detailed publications or studies, articles in professional journals, some published in the framework of research projects and collaborations with numerous important institutions, experts, theoreticians, art historians, and artists from the entire world.

== Museum of Avant-Garde ==
The Virtual Museum of Avant-Garde, based on the Marinko Sudac Collection, was created in 2009. It presents the digital database of the Collection through which you can see the overview of Avant-Garde art in the countries of former Yugoslavia structured according to authors, artworks, time periods, and geographical areas, as well as links and influences of the artists with cultural happenings and artistic centers in the region and the world. The website, beside the high-quality digitized artworks, contains biographies and bibliographies, alongside the connection of the artists with other artists, art institutions and cultural forums, as well as selected publications.

The online database show only a small part of the Collection. Speedy digitization of the material is crucial to accomplish the Museum's main aim, which is to make it a centre for information on the regional Avant-Garde practices.

The Virtual Museum of Avant-Garde is a free online platform to research all forms of Avant-Garde art of Eastern and Central Europe, to show connection with the rest of the world, to be a place for free thought and presenting the relevant cultural phenomena of Avant-Garde thought and artistic doing, to be a space for creating and publishing expert materials and research on the phenomena of the Avant-Garde. In its work, the Virtual Museum of Avant-Garde managed to become a meeting point of experts and intellectuals from the region and the artists, as well as interested public who can, in one place, find many information on the Avant-Garde movement in this area.

== Artists in the Marinko Sudac Collection ==
=== Former Yugoslavia ===
1915–1946	1946–1968	1968–1989
Aleksandar Vučo Andrija Maurović Antun Branko Šimić Antun Motika Avgust Černigoj Boško Tokin Branko Ve Poljanski Čedomil Plavšić Csuka Zoltán Dada Tank Dragan Aleksić Dušan Matić Eduard Stepančič Franjo Fius Ivan Goll Ivana Tomljenović Meller Janko Polić Kamov Jo Klek Ljubiša Jocić Ljubomir Micić Marijan Mikac Marko Ristić Mihailo S. Petrov Miho Schön Oskar Davičo Rade Drainac Radovan Ivšić Rastko Petrović Salomon Monny de Boully Srečko Kosovel Stanislav Vinaver Tank Traveleri UT Vane Bor Vilko Gecan Željko Hegedušić Zenit	Aleksandar Srnec Božidar Jelenić Božidar Rašica Branko Vlahović Dimitrije Bašičević Mangelos Đuro Seder Eugen Feller EXAT 51 GEFF Gorgona Ivan Kožarić Ivan Picelj Ivo Gattin Josip Vaništa Jozef Ács Julije Knifer Juraj Dobrović Koloman Novak Marijan Jevšovar Matko Meštrović Mihovil Pansini Miljenko Horvat Pal Petrik Petrik Pal Radoslav Putar Sava Simončić Stipo Pranyko Vjenceslav Richter Vladimir Petek Vlado Kristl Vojin Bakić Želimir Žilnik	Adresa Magazine Andraž Šalamun Ante Vukov Attila Csernik Autopsia Bálint Szombathy Bogdanka Poznanović Bojan Brecelj Boris Buċan Boris Demur Bosch+Bosch Braco Dimitrijević Crveni Peristil D. Raša Todosijeviċ David Nez Drago Dellabernardina Dragomir Ugren Dubravko Budiċ Era Milivojeviċ Fedor Vučemilović Franci Zagoričnik Gera Urkom Goran Trbuljak Gorki Žuvela Group of Six Authors Igor Grubić Ilija Šoškić Ivan Volarič-Feo Iztok Geister Janez Kocijančič Josip Stošić Katalin Ladik Kôd Group László Kerekeš László Szalma Marijan Molnar Marina Abramović Marjan Ciglić Marko Pogačnik Matjaž Hanžek Milenko Matanović Mirko Radojčiċ Mladen Stilinović Naško Križnar Neša Paripović Nuša Dragan OHO Peđa Vranešević Radomir Damnjanović-Damnjan Raša Todosijević Sanja Iveković Slavko Bogdanović Slavko Matkoviċ Slobodan Tišma Srečo Dragan Sven Stilinović The Šempas Family Tok Group Tomaž Šalamun Tomislav Gotovac Verbumprogram Vladimir Gudac Vladimir Kopicl Vlado Martek Vojin Kovač-Chubby Željko Jerman Željko Kipke Živko Grozdanić Zoran Popović

=== Hungary ===
1915–1946	1946–1968	1968–1989
100% Farkas Molnár Korunk Lajos Kássak MA Munka Sándor Bortyik Tibor Déry	István Nádler Miklós Erdély Imre Bak	Attila Pálfalusi Ferenc Ficzek Gábor Attalai Gyula Konkoly János Sugár Kálmán Szijártó Károly Kismányoky Károly Halász László Haris Pécsi Műhely Sándor Pinczehelyi Tamás St. Auby György Galántai Tibor Hajas Gyula Pauer Endre Tot Tibor Csiky Géza Pernecky Dóra Maurer Balatonboglár György Jovánovics Gyula Gulyás Gábor Tóth Tibor Gáyor

=== Czechoslovakia ===
1915–1946	1946–1968	1968–1989
Red Odeon Stavba Karel Teige Jindřich Štyrský Vítězslav Nezval Olymo Josef Čapek Otakar Mrkvička Ladislav Sutnar Jaromír Funke	Vladimir Boudník Milan Grygar Zdeněk Beran Dalibor Chatrný Milan Knížák Eugen Brikcius Jiří Kolář Běla Kolářová Stano Filko	Miroslav Klivar Jiří Valoch Karel Miler Jan Steklik Jiří Palla Jan Mlčoch Petr Štembera Jan Woynar J. H. Kocman Július Koller Rudolf Sikora Desider Tóth Milan Adamčiak Rudolf Fila Juraj Meliš Otis Laubert Milan Dobeš

=== Poland ===
1915–1946	1946–1968	1968–1989
	Jerzy Bereś Jarosław Kozłowski Józef Robakowski	Zdzisław Sosnowski Andrzej Lachowicz Natalia LL Permafo Gallery Teresa Tyszkiewicz Lech Mrožek Andrzej Partum Ryszard Wasko

=== Russia ===
1915–1946	1946–1968	1968–1989
Vladimir Mayakovski LEF	Dvizhenie Lev Nussberg Francisco Infante-Arana Galina Bitt Alexander Stepanov Viacheslav Koleichuk Anatoli Krivchikov Viacheslav Shcherbakov Yuri Lapokov Vladimir Jankilevskij Boris Diadorov Aleksei Smirnov Michail Grobman Ernst Neizvestny Viktor Pivovarov	Dmitri Prigov Oleg Kulik

=== United States ===
1915–1946	1946–1968	1968–1989
	Joseph Kosuth John Cage Fluxus Ken Friedman Philip Corner Bruce Conner Stan Brakhage Nam June Paik	Terry Fox

=== United Kingdom ===
1915–1946	1946–1968	1968–1989
		Gillian Wise

=== Romania ===
1915–1946	1946–1968	1968–1989
		Paul Neagu

=== Ukraine ===
1915–1946	1946–1968	1968–1989

=== Turkey ===
1915–1946	1946–1968	1968–1989
		Teoman Madra

=== The Netherlands ===
1915–1946	1946–1968	1968–1989
		Boegel & Holtappels

=== Italy ===
1915–1946	1946–1968	1968–1989
Filippo Tommaso Marineti Futurism Gabriele D'Annunzio	Piero Manzoni Azimuth Pasquale Ninì Santoro Nato Frascà Francesco Guerrieri Jorrit Tornquist	Franco VerdiLucia di Luciano Giovanni Pizzo Franco Di Vito

=== Switzerland ===
1915–1946	1946–1968	1968–1989
	Dieter Roth	

=== Germany ===
1915–1946	1946–1968	1968–1989
Dada Almanah Richard Huelsenbeck Kurt Schwitters Lothar Schreyer Der Strurm Der Blau Reiter Bauhaus Dada		Klaus Groh

=== Bulgaria ===
1915–1946	1946–1968	1968–1989

=== France ===
1915–1946	1946–1968	1968–1989
Guillaume Apollinarire Andre Breton		

=== Denmark ===
1915–1946	1946–1968	1968–1989
		Eric Andersen

=== Austria ===
1915–1946	1946–1968	1968–1989
		Arnulf Rainer Renate Bertlmann

=== Finland ===
1915–1946	1946–1968	1968–1989
		Outi Heiskanen

=== Japan ===
1915–1946	1946–1968	1968–1989

== Projects ==
Since its beginning, the Marinko Sudac Collection has been open to collaboration with various institutions. Through the years, the works from the Collection have been exhibited both locally and internationally.

The collection has been recognised as a good partner and the growing interest in different types of collaborations (exhibitions, conferences, projects, movies, publications) shows the quality of the Collections and its open character.

=== List of independently organised projects ===
- Baldo Diodato – Analytical Documentation of Urban Structures, Zuccato Gallery, Poreč, Croatia, 2025
- Paolo Patelli: Painted Surfaces. Marinko Sudac Collection, Zuccato Gallery, Poreč, Croatia, 2024
- Lucia di Luciano, Giovanni Pizzo: Arte Programmata - NFT's Point Zero, Ras Al Khaimah Art, UAE, 2024
- Radomir Damnjanović Damnjan: Three-dimensional Painting, Ras Al Khaimah Art, UAE, 2024
- Autopsia: Public Lesson in History. Marinko Sudac Collection, Zuccato Gallery, Poreč, Croatia, 2023
- The Legacy of the OHO Group - Marko Pogačnik, Portal of Peace; David Nez, Zoology of Absence, Ras Al Khaimah Fine Arts Festival, Ras Al Khaimah, United Arab Emirates, 2023
- Gorgona. The Solitude of Thought. On the Concept of an Experimental Re-examination of the Arts, Ras Al Khaimah Fine Arts Festival, Ras Al Khaimah, United Arab Emirates, 2023
- The Freedom of My Mind. Avant-garde Women Artists from the Marinko Sudac Collection, Vršilnica, Zaprešić, Croatia, 2023
- 62nd Poreč Annale: New Fundamental Tendencies, Istrian Assembly Hall; Small Gallery, Poreč, Croatia, 2022
- Stano Filko. Marinko Sudac Collection, Zuccato Gallery, Poreč, Croatia, 2022
- Bosch+Bosch Group. Marinko Sudac Collection, Museum of Art Olomouc, Olomouc, Czech Republic, 2022
- Lucia di Luciano, Giovanni Pizzo - Programmed Art, 1964 - 1967 | Marinko Sudac Collection, Varaždin City Museum, Exhibition Salon of the Sermage Palace, 2022
- Lucia di Luciano & Giovanni Pizzo "Programmed Art" | Marinko Sudac Collection, "Josip Račić" Gallery of the National Museum of Modern Art, Zagreb, Croatia, 2022
- Boris Demur – Analytical Works. Marinko Sudac Collection, Zuccato Gallery, Poreč, Croatia, 2021
- Commemorating the 100 years of the "Zenit" magazine, National Museum of Modern Art, Zagreb, Croatia, 2021
- Bosch + Bosch. Hungarian Art Movement in Vojvodina, Hungarian Cultural Institute, Brussels, Belgium, 2020
- Boris Demur. Analytical workd | Art Photo Budapest presentation, Millenáris park, Budapest, Hungary / virtual, 2020
- ICDHS 12 Conference, online project, Zagreb, Croatia, 2020
- Bogdanka Poznanović (1930. – 2013.), Marinko Sudac Collection, Zuccato Gallery, Poreč, Croatia, 2020
- Gorgona. Works from the Marinko Sudac Collection, Profile Foundation, Warsaw, Poland, 2019
- Philip Corner – No Notes Nonce | Other Aspects, Holland House, Sisak, Croatia, 2019
- Radoslav Putar and Miljenko Horvat. A Retrospective, Varaždin City Museum, Varaždin, Croatia, 2019
- Gorgona 1959 – 1968. Independent Artistic Practices in Zagreb. Retrospective Exhibition from the Marinko Sudac Collection, Kassák Museum, Budapest, Hungary, 2019
- Bosch+Bosch Group and the Vojvodina Neo-Avantgarde Movement, Ludwig Museum, Budapest, Hungary, 2019
- The Oho Group, 1962 – 1971, Marinko Sudac Collection, Zuccato Gallery, Poreč, Croatia, 2019
- "Artist on Vacation 2018" by Valamar, Museum of Contemporary Art, Zagreb, Croatia, 2019
- Autopsia Archive 1979 – 1989, City Gallery Striegl, Sisak, Croatia, 2019
- Paralelni narativi. Galerija umjetnina / Kolekcija Marinko Sudac, Gallery of Fine Arts, Split, Croatia, 2019
- Andrzej Lachowicz – A Form of Consciousness, Zuccato Gallery, Poreč, Croatia, 2018
- "Artist on Vacation 2017" by Valamar, Museum of Contemporary Art, Zagreb, Croatia, 2018
- "In Memoriam" – Josip Vaništa, Šira Gallery, Zagreb, Croatia, 2018
- Živko Grozdanić Gera – Allegories, Zuccato Gallery, Poreč, Croatia, 2017
- Radomir Damnjanović Damnjan, Paintings. 2009 – 2012, Zuccato Gallery, Poreč, Croatia, 2017
- Artist on Vacation 2016 \ Valamar, Museum of Contemporary Art Zagreb, Zagreb, Croatia, 2017
- Jiří Valoch – The Power of the Powerless, Marinko Sudac Collection, Museum of Contemporary Art Zagreb, Zagreb, Croatia, 2017
- Oho Films. A Retrospective (1963–1971) Marinko Sudac Collection, French Pavilion, Zagreb, Croatia, 2017
- El nem kötelezett művészet – Marinko Sudac gyűjteménye, Ludwig Museum – Museum of Contemporary Art, Budapest, Hungary, 2017
- Miljenko Horvat. Gorgona and After. Photographs | Marinko Sudac Collection, Photo Gallery Lang, Samobor, Croatia, 2017
- Slovakian Neo-Avant-Garde | Rudolf Sikora, Július Koller and the First Open Studio, Museum of Contemporary Art Zagreb, Zagreb, Croatia, 2017
- Non-Aligned Modernity . Eastern-European Art and Archives from the Marinko Sudac Collection, FM Center for Contemporary Art, Milan, Italy, 2016
- Jiří Valoch – The Power of the Powerless, Zuccato Gallery, Poreč, Croatia, 2016
- Neo Dada: Gorgona | Absurd Freedom, Gallery Thalberg, Zürich, Switzerland, 2016
- Julius Koller U. F. O. – naut J. K.?, Art Market Budapest 2015, Budapest, Hungary, 2016
- Radical Practices from Marinko Sudac Collection, A38 Ship Gallery, Budapest, Hungary, 2016
- Gorgona, Museum of Contemporary Art Zagreb, Zagreb, Croatia, 2015
- Artist on Vacation 2015, Museum of Contemporary Art Zagreb, Zagreb, Croatia, 2015
- Gorgona – Then and Now, Villa Polesini, Poreč, Croatia, 2015
- Blue Noses – From the Transition's Archives, Gallery of Fine Arts of the National Museum Zadar, Zadar, Croatia, 2015
- Vlado Martek | Read the Visual, Typholological Museum, Zagreb, Croatia, 2015
- Bucan Art from Marinko Sudac Collection, Gallery of Fine Arts, Split, Croatia, 2015
- Jiří Valoch – Word as a Painting, Gallery of Fine Arts, Split, Croatia, 2015
- Stano Filko – Transcendence, Art Market Budapest, Budapest, Hungary, 2014
- First World War and Avant-Garde Art, Museum of Contemporary Art Zagreb, Zagreb, Croatia, 2014
- Artist on Vacation 2014, Museum of Contemporary Art Zagreb, Zagreb, Croatia, 2014
- Bucan Art,, 2014Villa Polesini, Poreč, Croatia
- Transition and Transition – Oleg Kulig, Josip Vaništa, Blue Noses, Ludwig Museum – Museum of Contemporary Art, Budapest, Hungary, 2014
- Good Choice! Examples of Commercial Communication from the 50s and 60s, Fuliranje, Zagreb, Croatia, 2013
- Artist on Vacation 2013, Museum of Contemporary Art Zagreb, Zagreb, Croatia, 2013
- Transition – Oleg Kulig, Josip Vaništa, Blue Noses, Villa Polesini, Poreč, Croatia, 2013
- Bauhaus by Ivana Tomljenović Meller, Worker's Gallery, Zagreb, Croatia, 2012 – 2013
- The manifestation of a spiral due to Y. Klein – Boris Demur, Damian Nenadić, Foto galerija Lang, Samobor, Croatia, 2012
- Artist on Vacation 2012, Museum of Contemporary Art Zagreb, Zagreb, Croatia, 2012
- Ivan Kožarić, Novi Spa & Resorts, Novi Vinodolski, Croatia, 2012
- Marinko Sudac Collection: Permanent Avant-Garde, KUAD Gallery, Istanbul, Turkey, 2012
- Circles of Interference. The Marinko Sudac Collection, the Petőfi Literary Museum – Kassák Museum, Budapest, Hungary, 2012
- Standstill – Activist art from the Marinko Sudac Collection, "Seagull" ship, Rijeka, Croatia, 2011
- Branimir Donat and Visual Poetry, Glyptotheque HAZU, Zagreb, Croatia, 2011
- Oh After Oho, Museum of Contemporary Art Zagreb, Zagreb, Croatia, 2010
- Aleksandar Srnec: Experimental Reality, Museum Lapidarium, Novigrad, Croatia, 2010
- Ivana Tomljenović Meller, Photographs and Photomontages Bauhaus, Dessau 1929–1930, Photo Gallery Lang, Samobor, Croatia, 2010
- The Present Absence – Aleksandar Srnec, Museum of Contemporary Art Zagreb, Zagreb, Croatia, 2010
- Aleksandar Srnec, Zuccato Gallery, Poreč, Croatia, 2008
- The Present Absence – Aleksandar Srnec, The Gallery of Old and New Masters, Varaždin, Croatia, 2008
- Marginal Specificities – Regional Avant-Garde Art 1915–1989, Museum of Modern and Contemporary Art, Rijeka, Croatia, 2007
- Marginal Specificities: Avant-Garde Art of ex-Yugoslavia 1914–1989, Museum of Contemporary Art of Vojvodina, Novi Sad, Serbia, 2006
- Vlado Martek... The Artist as a Mobile Map, Zlatno oko Gallery, Novi Sad, Srbija, 2006
- Marginal Specificities – Regional Avant-Garde Art, Gallery Centre Varaždin, Varaždin, Croatia, 2005
- Marijan Molnar, Vila Oršić, Varaždin, Croatia, 2004
- Vlado Martek, Vila Oršić, Varaždin, Croatia, 2004

=== List of collaborations with institutions (loans of works from the Marinko Sudac Collection) ===
- Poezie & performance. Východoevropská perspektiva, Památník národního písemnictví – Letohrádek Hvězda, Prague, Czech Republic, 2024
- Multiple Realities: Experimental Art in the Eastern Bloc, 1960s-1980s, Phoenix Art Museum, Phoenix, AZ. USA, 2024
- Multiple Realities: Experimental Art in the Eastern Bloc, 1960s-1980s, Walker Art Center, Minneapolis, USA, 2024
- The Gleaners Society | 40th EVA International, EVA International, Irish Biennial of Contemporary Art, Limerick City, Ireland, 2023
- Forecast and Fantasy: Architecture Without Borders, 1960s-1980s, Estonian Museum of Architecture, Tallinn, Estonia, 2023
- Valoch & Valoch: Archeologie a konceptuální umění, Pražákův palác, Brno, Czech Republic, 2022
- ART CONTACT - Networking of Artistic Ideas, Museum of Contemporary Art, Zagreb, Croatia, 2021
- Poetry and Performance. The Eastern-European Perspective, Kultura Medialna, Dnipro, Ukraine, 2021
- Our Other Us – Art Encounters Biennial, Art Encounters Foundation Timișoara, Timișoara, Romania, 2021
- THE ANTINOMIES OF ∞ AUTONOMY, "Cvijeta Zuzorić" Art Pavilion, Belgrade, Serbia, 2021
- 51st Annale: Wasting Life Away, Istrian Assembly Hall, Poreč, Croatia, 2021
- Ivan Kožarić: A Retrospective – One of the 100 Possible Ones, Museum of Contemporary Art, Zagreb, Croatia
- Költészet és performansz – a kelet-európai perspektíva, Kassák Museum, Budapest, Hungary, 2021
- Ivan Kožarić. To Fly into the Ether or Stay on Earth, Museum of Modern and Contemporary Art, Rijeka, Croatia, 2021
- Pre-contemporary Action – Postmodern Reaction, National Museum of Modern Art, Zagreb, Croatia, 2021
- Poetry and Performance. Eastern-European Perspective, Oblastní galerie Liberec, Liberec, The Czech Republic, 2020
- 1. otvorený ateliér 1970 – 2020, Galéria 19, Bratislava, Slovakia
- The Analogical Mirrors, Yamanaka Suplex, Otsu-city, Shiga, Japan, 2020
- Portraits and the Sky: Yugoslav Experimental Films, 1960s–1990s, Berkeley Art Museum and Pacific Film Archive (BAMPFA), Berkeley, California, USA, 2020
- Praksa teorije: Matko Meštrović i dizajn, Croatian Designers Association, Zagreb, Croatia, 2020
- Wiek półcienia. Sztuka w czasach planetarnej zmiany, Museum of Modern Art, Warsaw, Poland, 2020
- Teresa Tyszkiewicz: dzień po dniu, Muzeum Sztuki in Łódź, Łódź, Poland, 2020
- Poetry and Performance. The Eastern European Perspective, Wroclaw Contemporary Museum, Wrocław, Poland, 2020
- The Penumbral Age. Art in the Time of Planetary Change, Museum of Modern Art, Warsaw, Poland, 2020
- Teresa Tyszkiewicz: Day After Day, Museum of Art in Łódź, Łódź, Poland, 2020
- Vlado Martek Exhibition with Many Titles, City Art Gallery of Ljubljana, Ljubljana, Slovenia, 2020
- City Visions – City Iconography II (1950 – 2000+), Modern Gallery, Zagreb, Croatia, 2019
- Years of Disarray 1908 – 1928. Avant-gardes in Central Europe, Jannus Pannonius Museum, Pécs, Hungary, 2019
- Vertigo. Op Art and a History of Optical Illusion 1520 -1970, Kunstmuseum Stuttgart, Stuttgart, Germany, 2019
- See You after the Revolution! 100 years of Bauhaus, Arsenal Gallery, Białystok, Poland, 2019
- Through a Forest Wilderness – Aktionen im Wald. Performance, Konzeptkunst, Events. 1960 – ∞, Kunsthalle Wilhelmshaven + Neuenburger Holz, Wilhelmshaven, Germany, 2019
- The Years of Disarray 1908–1928. Avantgardes in Central Europe, Bratislava City Gallery, Bratislava, Slovakia, 2019
- Vertigo Op Art and a History of Deception 1520–1970, mumok – museum moderner kunst stiftung ludwig wien, Vienna, Austria, 2019
- Vlado Martek: Exhibition with Many Titles, Museum of Modern and Contemporary Art, Rijeka, Croatia, 2019
- Poetry & Performance. The Eastern European Perspective, Motorenhalle. Projektzentrum für zeitgenössische Kunst, Dresden Germany, 2019
- Il Soggetto Imprevisto. 1978 Arte e Femminismo in Italia, FM Centro per l'Arte Contemporanea, Milan, Italy, 2019
- Czas przełomu. Sztuka awangardy w Europie Środkowej 1908–1928, International Cultural Centre, Krakow, Poland, 2019
- Goran Trbuljak: nikada do sada viđen rad neviđenog umjetnika, Museum of Modern and Contemporary Art, Rijeka, Croatia
- Projekcije: Motika, Brakhage, Srnec Antun Motika i nasljeđe eksperimenta, Municipal Gallery Pula, Pula, Croatia
- Recordings – New Artistic Practices from Yugoslavia, Fundacja Profile, Warsaw, Polan, 2018
- Okruženju usprkos, HDLU, Zagreb, Croatia, 2018
- Ilija Šoškić – Akcione forme, Museum of Contemporary Art, Belgrade; Museum of Contemporary Art Vojvodina, Novi Sad, Serbia, 2018
- Through a Forest Wilderness – Actions in the Forest. Performance, Conceptual Art, Events. 1960 – ∞, Nikolskoer Landpartie, Berlin, Germany, 2018
- Poetry & Performance. The Eastern European Perspective, Shedhalle Zurich, Zurich, Switzerland 2018
- Marijan Molnar – Inventura, Gallery of Fine Arts, Split, Croatia, 2018
- Years of Disarray / Between Anxiety and Delight: the Birth of the Modern Central European Citizen 1908–1928, Olomouc Museum of Art, Olomouc, Czech Republic, 2018
- The Other Trans-Atlantic: Kinetic and Op Art in Eastern Europe and Latin America 1950s – 1970s, SESC Pinheiros – São Paulo, São Paulo, Brazil, 2018
- Farewell to Spring | 1968 in the Eastern Block, Galeria Centralis, Vera and Donald Blinken Open Society Archives, Budapest, Hungary, 2018
- Marko Pogačnik – Tretja umetnost, Galerija Prešernovih nagrajencev Kranj, Kranj, Slovenia, 2018
- CUT / REZ – Examples of collage in artistic practices in Central and Eastern Europe from the Avant-garde until today, Museum of Contemporary Art, Zagreb, Croatia, 2018
- ŽELJKO KIPKE Diagnosis: Double Vision, Gallery of Arts, Split, Croatia, 2018
- The Other Trans-Atlantic, Garage, Moscow, Russia, 2018
- Poezija & performans. Istočnoevropska perspektiva, Student's Cultural Centre, Podroom Gallery, Belgrade, Serbia. 2018
- Novi Sad Orpheuses – Új Symposion (1965–1992), the Vojvodina journal, Ferenczy Múzeum, Szentendre, Hungary, 2018
- Projekcije: Antun Motika in dediščina eksperimenta, Škuc Gallery, Ljubljana, Slovenia, 2018
- Poézia a performancia. Východoeurópska perspektíva, Nová synagóga, Žilina, Slovakia, 2017 – 2018
- You've Got 1243 Unread Messages. Last Generation Before the Internet. Their Lives, Latvian National Museum of Art, Riga, Latvia, 2017
- Párhuzamos avantgárd – Pécsi Műhely 1968–1980, Savaria Múzeum, Szombathely, Hungary, 2017
- Rejestracje, Fundacja Profile, Warsaw, Poland, 2017
- Today's Yesterday – The 1st Anren Biennale, Anren, Chengdu, China, 2017
- The Other Transatlantic. Kinetic & Op Art in Central & Eastern Europe and Latin America, Museum of Modern Art in Warsaw, Warsaw, Poland, 2017
- Kassákizmus 1., Petőfi Irodalmi Múzeum, Budapest, Hungary, 2017
- Exat 51. Experimental Atelier Synthesis Of The Arts In Post-War Yugoslavia. Ideology, Abstraction And Architecture, Museum Haus Lange, Krefeld, Germany, 2017
- Natural Histories. Traces of the Political, mumok – Museum moderner Kunst Stiftung Ludwig, Vienna, Austria, 2017
- Gutljaj jedan, ali vrijedan. Segestica Sisak 1917.-2017., Sisak City Museum, Sisak, Croatia, 2017
- Párhuzamos avantgárd – Pécsi Műhely 1968 – 1980, m21 Galéria, Pecs, Hungary
- Through a Forest Wilderness – Actions in the Forest. Performance, Conceptual Art, Events. 1960 – ∞, Brandenburgischer Kunstverein Potsdam, Germany, 2017
- Viva Arte Viva, 57th Venice Biennial, Venice, Italy, 2017
- Parallel Avant-garde – Pécs Workshop 1968–1980, Ludwig Museum – Museum of Contemporary Art, Budapest, Hungary, 2017
- Projections – Antun Motika and the legacy of experiment, Museum of Modern and Contemporary Art, Rijeka, Croatia, 2017
- Drago Dellabernardina, P74 Gallery, Ljubljana, Slovenia, 2017
- Facing the future. Art in Europe 1945–1968, Pushkin State Museum of Fine Arts, Moscow, Russia, 2017
- Slovenia and Non-Aligned Pop, Umetnostna galerija Maribor, Slovenia, 2016 – 2017
- Art in Europe 1945–1968: Facing the Future, ZKM, Karlsruhe, Germany, 2016
- Postwar: Art between the Pacific and the Atlantic, 1945–1965, Haus der Kunst, Munich, Germany, 2016
- Notes From The Underground. Art And Alternative Music in Eastern Europe 1968–1994, Muzeum Sztuki w Łodzi, Łodz, Poland, 2016
- Ivo Gattin, Adris Gallery, Rovinj, Croatia, 2016
- Politiche della Natura, Fondazione Zimei, Pescara, Italy, 2016
- ecologEAST – Art and Nature Beyond the Wall, PAV Parco Arte Vivente, Turin, Italy, 2016
- Monuments Should Not Be Trusted, Nottingham Contemporary, Nottingham, United Kingdom, 2016
- Ludwig Goes Pop + The East Side Story, Ludwig Museum – Museum of Contemporary Art, Budapest, Hungary, 2016
- The EY Exhibition: The World Goes Pop, Tate Modern, London, United Kingdom, 2015 – 2016
- Phlogiston, Gallery of Fine Arts, Splits, Croatia, 2015
- Đuro Seder – A Retrospective Exhibition, 1953–2015, Modern Gallery, Zagreb, Croatia, 2015
- The 80's – Sweet decadence of postmodernism, HDLU, Zagreb, Croatia, 2015
- Željko Kipke: Prints, Gramophones and Tonsures, Croatian Academy of Sciences and Art -Glyptotheque, Zagreb, Croatia, 2015
- Art Has No Alternative (An Archive of Artists in Action), tranzit.sk Gallery, Bratislava, Slovakia, 2015
- Personal Cuts*, Carré d’Art-Musée d’art contemporain, Nîmes, France, 2014
- Željko Kipke: Graphics '77, Grafički Kolektiv Gallery, Belgrade, Serbia, 2014
- Conscious Hallucinations. Filmic Surrealism, Deutsches Filmmuseum Frankfurt, Frankfurt, Germany, 2014
- Love Towards Subversion, Kazamat Gallery, Osijek, Croatia, 2014
- Tabula Rasa: Self-Reflective, Primary and Analytical in Croatian Art, Museum of Contemporary Art of Istria, Pula, Croatia, 2014
- Ivan Kožarić. Freedom Is a Rare Bird, Haus der Kunst, München, Germany, 2013
- Tabula rasa: The Primary and Analytical in Croatian Art, Glyptotheque HAZU, Zagreb, Croatia, 2013
- Antun Motika: Experiments, Museum of Modern and Contemporary Art, Pula, Croatia, 2013
- Josip Vaništa: Abolition of Retrospective, Museum of Contemporary Art Zagreb, Zagreb, Croatia, 2013
- Love Towards Subversion, dr. Vinko Perčić Gallery, Subotica, Serbia, 2013
- The Freedom of Sound – John Cage behind the Iron Curtain, Ludwig Museum – Museum of Contemporary Art, Budapest, Hungary, 2012 – 2013
- Željko Kipke – Police Back Yard, Art Pavilion in Zagreb, Zagreb, Croatia, 2012
- Željko Kipke: Police Back-Yard, Museum of Contemporary Art of Vojvodina, Novi Sad, Serbia, 2012
- High times: Reflections of psychedelia in socialist Yugoslavia 1966–1976, Škuc Gallery, Ljubljana, Slovenia, 2011 – 2012
- Socialism and Modernity, Museum of Contemporary Art, Zagreb, 2012
- Tune in Screening: Psychedelic Moving Images from Socialist Yugoslavia 1966.–1976., Land of Tomorrow, Lexington, USA, 2011
- Volume Collection, Museum of Modern and Contemporary Art, Rijeka, Croatia, 2011
- Spaceship Earth, Centre of Contemporary Art Znaki Czasu, Torun, Poland, 2011
- Public matters!, Gallery of Contemporary Art, Celje, Slovenia, 2011
- Tune in Screening: Psychedelic Moving Images from Socialist Yugoslavia 1966.–1976., Stephan Stoyanov Gallery, New York City, 2010
- Slought in Transit, HDLU, Zagreb, Hrvatska, 2010
- From Art to Life. Hungarians at the Bauhaus, Janus Pannonius Museum, Pécs, Hungary, 2010
- As soon as I open my eyes I see a film. Experiment in the art of Yugoslavia in the 60s and 70s, Museum of Modern Art, Warsaw, Poland, 2008
- Vlado Martek: A Retrospective 1973 – 2007, Croatian Academy of Sciences and Art -Glyptotheque, Zagreb, Croatia, 2008
- Avant-Garde Tendencies in Croatian Art, Klovićevi Dvori Gallery, Zagreb, Croatia, 2007
- On unknown works, Gallery Nova, Zagreb, Croatia, 2006
- Demur, Modern Gallery, Zagreb, Croatia, 2004
- From Futurism to Fontana, Apedemak Gallery, Zagreb, Croatia, 2002

=== Collaborations on documentaries ===
- OHO - documentary on the OHO group, produced by Vertigo and co-produced by RTV Slovenija and Marinko Sudac
- HRT show Jedno djelo – episodes "Josip Vaništa, Beskonački štap / U čast Manetu", "Miljenko Horvat – Gorgonska polja", "Antun Motika – Eksperimenti"
- Pumpkin on the Hot Roof of the World – Poetry and the Eternal Life of Tomaž Šalamun, directors: Nejc Saje, Jeffrey Young; production: Viva Videnović (Strup)
- The Other Line, documentary film, director and writer: Nenad Milošević
- Artist on Vacation, documentary film, directors: Sandra Bastašić, Damian Nenadić
- Gorgona, documentary film, director and editor Ana Marija Habjan

== Publications ==
As part of its activities, the interconnected institutions of the Museum of Avant-Garde, Marinko Sudac Collection, and the Institute for the Research of the Avant-Garde publish various types of publications – artist monographs, exhibition catalogues etc.

The aim of these publishing projects is to present relevant artists, artist groups, artistic movements and developments of the former Yugoslavia region, as well as of Eastern and Central Europe. By presenting them through publications, the aim is to provide them with better international recognition and valorisations, so they could be placed in their rightful position in the global art scene.

=== Artist monographs ===
- Ješa Denegri, "Gorgona", Agroinova d.o.o, edition: ArtInova, Zagreb, (ISBN 9789535867517)
- Ješa Denegri, Feđa Vukić, Hrvoje Turković – Aleksandar Srnec (ISBN 9789539567819)
- Miško Šuvaković, "Bogdanka i Dejan Poznanović : umetnost, mediji i aktivizam na kraju moderne" (ISBN 9789535670612)
- Želimir Koščević, Vladimir Gudac, "Budić : između geste i programa" (ISBN 9789539567802)

=== Exhibition catalogues ===
- 62nd Poreč Annale: New Fundamental Tendencies (ISBN 978-953-56706-5-0, 978-953-6302-97-0)
- Transition and Transition (ISBN 9789639537408)
- Circles of Interference (ISBN 9789638701466)
- At Standstill (ISBN 9789535670605)
- Rubne posebnosti : avangardna umjetnost u regiji : Muzej moderne i suvremene umjetnosti, Rijeka, 9. III.-15. IV. 2007. (ISBN 9789536501519 )
- Avangardna umjetnost u regiji od 1915–1989 : kolekcija Marinko Sudac Galerijski Centar Varaždin (OCLC: 192137801)
- Rubne posebnosti : avangardna umetnost ex-Jugoslavije 1914–1989, katalog izložbe, Muzej savremene umjetnosti Vojvodine, Novi Sad
- Dobar izbor! Primjeri komercijalne komunikacije iz 50-ih i 60-ih : Kolekcija Marinko Sudac (ISBN 978-953-579-000-6)
- Od futurizma do Fontane, 2002

=== Expert publications ===
- Ješa Denegri – "Prilozi za drugu liniju 3" (ISBN 9789535867500)
- Ješa Denegri – "Razlozi za drugu liniju : za novu umetnost sedamdesetih" (ISBN 978-868-4773-30-4)
- eds. Feđa Vukić, Iva Kostešić – "Lessons to Learn? Past Design Experiences and Contemporary Design Practice", Proceedings of the 12th International Conference on the History of Design and Design Studies, 2021.

=== Institute for the Research of the Avant-Garde editions / Druga linija | The Other Line ===
- Freedom of My Mind. Avant-Garde Women Artists from the Marinko Sudac Collection, 2023 (ISBN 978-953-56706-6-7)
- Radoslav Putar and Miljenko Horvat. A Retrospective, 2019 (ISBN 978-953-8280-07-8, ISBN 978-953-56706-3-6)
- Ješa Denegri – "Prilozi za drugu liniju 4", 2020

== Institute for the Research of the Avant-Garde ==
The Institute for the Research of the Avant-Garde was founded in 2010, as part of the project with the aim to study, preserve, present, and popularize the regional Avant-Garde art through exhibitions, projects, and publications. Since its foundation, the Institute started or collaborated on over 130 projects, including: the organisation of the central event to commemorate the centenary of the First World War, which was the exhibition and the international conference "The First World War and Avant-garde Art: Deconstruction-Construction", participation in the international project of exhibitions "Years of Disarray" supported by the European Union, organisation or participation on exhibitions in over 15 countries and publishing activity. The institute is the holder of the "Artist on Vacation" project which has annually been hosting, since 2012, numerous notable artists of the neo-avant-garde and radical artistic practices.

=== Artist on Vacation ===
Since 2012, the Artist on Vacation project has gathered, hosted and presented to the public a number of internationally prestigious artists who belong to the period of historical Avant-gardes, as well as artists who continue the practice of radical art and further develop its aesthetics. In the summer months, Poreč becomes a vacation spot for international artists. In collaboration with Valamar Riviera d.d., the Institute for the Research of Avant-Garde and Marinko Sudac Collection invite artists to spend a week at an exclusive hotel and vacation on the beautiful Istrian peninsula.

The project was created by Marinko Sudac as an extension of the activities of the Museum of Avant-Garde, the Institute for the Research of Avant-Garde and Marinko Sudac Collection. It complements the collection's mission, and gives affirmation to the artists in the social, cultural and artistic contexts. The mission of the Artists on Vacation project is to show the various legacies of the original Avant-Garde movement that have developed in different countries and contexts.

The driving force behind the project is to present the participating artists to the Croatian public. The project is an effort to connect all the activities that aim to bring together the historical avant-gardes and present them to the public in a direct way, outside of an institutional environment. Artists get an opportunity to meet other artists, but also theorists, art historians, and museum professionals. This exchange of ideas and influences brings about personal and artistic developments and paves way to new collaborations and projects. Every year, there is an exclusive one day exhibition organized during the Project.

Each year, at the end of the project, an exhibition of works created during the Artist on Vacation project, as well as a presentation of the participating artists is organized at the Museum of Contemporary Art Zagreb. A catalogue of a year's project is produced. The catalogue contains all the information about the project, the participating artists, their stay at Poreč, their works etc.

Every year, there is an exclusive one day exhibition organized during the project.

- 2023 - "Autopsia: Public Lesson in History. Marinko Sudac Collection", Zuccato Gallery, Poreč
- 2022 – "Stano Filko. Marinko Sudac Collection", Zuccato Gallery, Poreč
- 2019 – "OHO Group, 1962 – 1971. Marinko Sudac Collection", Zuccato Gallery, Poreč
- 2018 – "Andrzej Lachowicz – A Form of Consciousness", Zuccato Gallery, Poreč
- 2017 – "Radomir Damnjanović Damnjan – Paintings, 2009 – 2012", Zuccato Gallery, Poreč; "Živko Grozdanić Gera – Allegories", Zuccato Gallery, Poreč
- 2016 – "Jiří Valoch – The Power of the Powerless", Zuccato Gallery, Poreč
- 2015 – "Gorgona", Villa Polesini, Poreč
- 2014 – "Bucan Art" – Boris Bućan, Villa Polesini, Poreč
- 2013 – "Transition" – Vaništa, Kulik, Blue Noses, Villa Polesini, Poreč
- 2012 – "Ivan Kožarić", Novi Spa & Resort, Novi Vinodolski

==== Participants ====
In 2012: Attila Csernik (Serbia), Era Milivojević (Serbia), Radomir Damnjanović Damnjan (Italy), Ilija Šoškić (Italy), Ivan Kožarić (Croatia), János Sugár (Hungary), Vlado Martek (Croatia), Sándor Pinczehelyi (Hungary), Bálint Szombathy (Hungary), Romelo Pervolovici (Romania), Željko Kipke (Croatia).

In 2013: Željko Kipke (Croatia), Dan Perjovschi (Romania), Rudolf Sikora (Slovakia), Zdzisław Sosnowski (Poland), Blue Noses – Alexandr Shaburov and Vyacheslav Mizin (Russia), Oleg Kulik (Russia), Eric Andersen (Denmark), Marko Pogačnik (Slovenia), Živko Grozdanić (Serbia), Bálint Szombathy (Hungary), Ben Patterson (USA).

In 2014: Dragomir Ugren (Serbia), Gergelj Urkom (Serbia), Ulay (Germany), Era Milivojević (Serbia), Andraž Šalamun (Slovenia), David Nez (USA), Jiří Valoch (Czech Republic), Sven Stilinović (Croatia), Igor Grubić (Croatia).

In 2015: Verbumprogram (Serbia), Autopsia (Czech Republic), Teresa Tyszkiewicz (France), Ewa Partum (Poland), Przemysław Kwiek (Poland), Guia Rigvava (Austria), Jan Steklik (Czech Republic), Michail Grobman (Israel), Vadim Fiskin (Slovenia), Deimantas Narkevičius (Lithuania), Miloš Šejn (Czech Republic), Srečo Dragan (Slovenia), Milan Adamčiak (Slovakia).

In 2016: István Nádler (Hungary), Katalin Ladik (Hungary), Raša Todosijević (Serbia), Lev Nussberg (Russia), Philip Corner (USA), Rudolf Sikora (Slovakia), Slobodan Šijan (Serbia), Jarosław Kozłowski (Poland), Vladimir Gudac (Croatia)

In 2017: Ken Friedman (USA / Sweden), Miroslav Pavlović (Serbia), Zoran Todorović (Serbia), Andrien Sina (France), Nikola Džafo (Serbia), Tanja Ostojić (Serbia / Germany), Koji Kamoji (Japan / Poland), Józef Robakowski (Poland), Jusuf Hadžifejzović (Bosnia and Hercegovina), Boris Buden (Croatia)

In 2018: Marijan Molnar (Croatia), Vlado Martek (Croatia), Dragan Živadinov (Slovenia), Adela Jušić (B&H), Lana Čmajčanin (B&H), Dubravko Mataković (Croatia), Vladimir Nikolić (Serbia), Eulàlia Grau (Spain/Catalonia), Ludo Mich (Belgium), Tijana Petrović (Serbia), Vanja Žunić (Serbia), Milica Bilanović (B&H), Isidora Pejović (Serbia), Jelena Pantelić (Serbia), Vasily Slonov (Russia)

In 2019: Lipa Mill (B&H), Marjan Ciglič (Slovenia), Matjaž Hanžek (Slovenia), Marko Tadić (Croatia), Marijan Crtalić (Croatia), Sándor Pinczehelyi (Hungary), Miroslav Miša Savić (Serbia), Selma Selman (B&H/USA), Rena&Vladan (Serbia), Josef Dabernig (Austria), Igor Grubić (Croatia)

In 2022: Autopsia, Lucia di Luciano (Italy), Giovanni Pizzo (Italy), Naško Križnar (Slovenia), Tristan Pranyko (Croatia/Germany), Frieder Nake (German), Jorrit Tornquist (Austria/Italy)

==== Artist on Vacation Documentary ====
Documentary film "Artist on Vacation" follows the activities of 11 world-renowned artists who have gathered in a luxurious Adriatic resort for a one-month vacation. Documentary is a collage of recorded activities and accomplishments of artists in the given space, which is a vacation destination of mostly high classes of society. The artists which we are following are: Attila Csernik (Serbia), Radomir Damnjanović Damnjan (Serbia), Željko Kipke (Croatia), Ivan Kožarić (Croatia), Vlado Martek (Croatia), Era Milivojević (Serbia), Romelo Pervolovici (Romania), Pinczehely Sandor (Hungary), Balint Szombathy (Hungary), Janos Sugar (Hungary) and Ilija Šoškić (Montenegro).

Directors: Sandra Bastašić, Damian Nenadić

Producers: Oliver Sertić, Vanja Jambrović

Co-producer and author of the concept: Marinko Sudac

Cinematographer: Damian Nenadić

Editor: Sandra Bastašić

Additional camera: Aleš Sudac

Production: Restart Laboratory and Marinko Sudac

in cooperation with: the Institute for researching the Avant-garde and Melange production

Duration: 30 min.

Shooting Format: HD

=== Artists Respond ===
Artists Respond project was started by the Institute for the Research of the Avant-Garde and the Marinko Sudac Collection. Addressing the 2020 coronavirus global pandemic, the project aims to virtually present the thoughts and attitudes of neo-avant-garde artists, their energy and the message they have for the present moment.

This is the moment in which the world as we know it is on hold and the moment in which we need optimism and solidarity more than ever. We wish for the public to welcome the creative energy of these artists – artists who are ready to point out the state of things, to respond with art and creativity, as they have done in all difficult times in the past.

Participating artists: Philip Corner (US/IT), Eulàlia Grau (ES), Bálint Szombathy (ex-YU/HU), Ilya & Emilia Kabakov (ex-USSR/US), Sándor Pinczehelyi (HU), Vasily Slonov (RU), David Nez (US), Michail Grobman (ex-USSR/IS), Eric Andersen (BE/DK), Igor Makarevich (ex-USSR/RU), Santiago Sierra (ES), Milan Knížák (CZ), Artur Barrio (PT/BR), Autopsia, Dan Perjevoschi (RO), Miloš Šejn (CZ), Deimantas Narkevičius (LT), Francisco Infante-Arana (ex-USSR/RU), Sérgio Leitão (PT), Damir Muratov (RU), Kirsten Justesen (DK), Babi Badalov (AZ/FR) ... (to be updated).

== Marinko Sudac Foundation ==
The Marinko Sudac Foundation was established in 2022 with the general purpose of ensuring the conditions for permanent protection, preservation, scientific study, professional presentation and popularization of museological units and artists who are part of the Marinko Sudac Collection and other related artists, as well as those artists who act as a legacy of the practice of artists from the Marinko Sudac Collection.

== Interviews ==
- Kožarićeva skulptura Zagreb bi mogla učiniti prepoznatljivim kao što je Kapoorova učinila Chicago, Večernji list, 2020
- Marinko Sudac – Avangart Fenomenlerin Peşinde, Artam Global Art and Design, 2019
- How Art History Is Being Re-Written with Eastern European Avant-Garde, Larry's list, 2019
- Danas je promocija Gorgone, monografije o jednoj od najvažnijih umjetničkih grupa. Pričali smo s njenim urednikom, Telegram, 2018
- Védőpajzsot akarok vonni az avantgárd köré – Beszélgetés Marinko Sudaccal, Artmagazin no. 96, 2017
- Marinko Sudac: Hrvatska avangarda integralni je i neodvojivi dio svjetske kulturne baštine, ViV, 2017
- A Gyũjtõ Álma. Interjú Marinko Sudac Horvát Mũgyũjtõvel, Ludwig Museum blog, 2017
- Interview with Marinko Sudac, Easttopics, 2017
- «Это проект размораживания утопии», Zerkalo, 2015
- Historical carriers of vital DNA. Interview with Marinko Sudac, SZUM, 2015
- Marinko Sudac: Ova izložba je kao da sam dobio Oscara, Večernji list, 2012
