= Dada Jazz =

The cover of Dada Jazz from September 1922.

Dada Jazz was a Yugoslav Dadaist single issue publication published in Zagreb in September 1922 and edited by Dragan Aleksić. Aleksić published Dada Tank as a response to Branko Ve Poljanski and his brother Ljubomir Micić's anti-Dada publication Dada-Jok from May 1922. Although Dada Jazz has been characterized as a mere footnote to Dada Tank, it was in fact intended as a "Dada anthology", analogous to Richard Huelsenbeck's Dada Almanach.

== Background ==
After falling out with the representative of Dada in Yugoslavia, Dragan Aleksić, the Zenitists Branko Ve Poljanski and Ljubomir Micić published an anti-Dada single issue publication in May 1922 called Dada-Jok. Through a skillful, reflexive parody of the movement, the editor Poljanski sought to expose Dada's limits as an artistic and spiritual current, proposing Zenitism in its stead. As a response, Aleksić published two single-issue pamphlets of his own – Dada Tank in June and Dada Jazz in September 1922.

== Contents ==
Dada Jazz reprinted Dragan Aleksić's 1921 essay "Dadaism" from Zenit, subtly reminding people of his seniority over Ljubomir Micić. It included a major text by Tristan Tzara, titled "Manifeste de Monsieur Aa, l'antiphilosophe" (Manifesto of Mr Aa the Antiphilosoper), as well as Tzara's short verse "Colonial Syllogism", alongside a poem by Aleksić. On the centerfold two pages was printed the typographic picture-poem "Smaknu" (Execution), a translation into Serbo-Croatian of a Hungarian poem by Ádám Csont that had originally appeared, like Erwin Enders's "Greek Fire" published in Dada Tank, in the May 1922 issue of the Vienna-based publication MA. Tzara's work in Dada Jazz was published in its original French.

Although Dada Jazz has been characterized as a mere footnote to Dada Tank, it was in fact a very different project. Its cover designated it to be a "Dada anthology", analogous to Richard Huelsenbeck's Dada Almanach, which Aleksić had translated and excerpted in Dada Tank.

== Legacy ==
In the late 1960s, novelist Bora Ćosić published the first reprints of Dada Tank and Dada Jazz in the Neo-avantgarde pro-Fluxus magazine Rok.
