= Dada-Jok =

The cover of Dada-Jok from May 1922.

Dada-Jok (Dada No) was a Yugoslav anti-Dada single issue publication published in May 1922 and edited by the Zenitist Branko Ve Poljanski. It was Poljanski's and his brother Ljubomir Micić's response to the Dada movement following their falling out with its representative in Yugoslavia, Dragan Aleksić.

== Name ==
The word Dada is homophone to the Serbian interjection "da, da" meaning "yes, yes". "Jok" is a loanword derived from the Turkish "yok" (meaning "no").

== Contents ==
Although self-mockery was already present in Dadaism, the magazine Dada-Jok was meant to dismiss the merits of Dada. Through a skillful, reflexive parody of the movement, Poljanski sought to expose Dada's limits as an artistic and spiritual current, proposing Zenitism in its stead.

Dada-Jok's eight-page foldout sheet was littered with arbitrarily boldfaced or capitalized letters, photographs and manifesto-style texts by Poljanski and Ljubomir Micić, as well as collages and paintings by Zagreb-based tailor and artist Petar Bauk. The publication acknowledged the ambiguity over whether Dada-Jok was itself Dada or not, and thus proclaimed Micić the "great anti-dadaist ... God of Dada". Beside the texts by Poljanski and Micić, Dada-Jok also included articles by Micić's wife Anuška, under the pseudonym Nina-Naj.

== Legacy ==
On the occasion of the 100-year anniversary of the founding of the Dada movement, the National Library of Serbia put its copy of Dada-Jok on display.

== See also ==
- Dada Tank
