= Dragan Aleksić =

Serbian poet, author, journalist and filmmaker

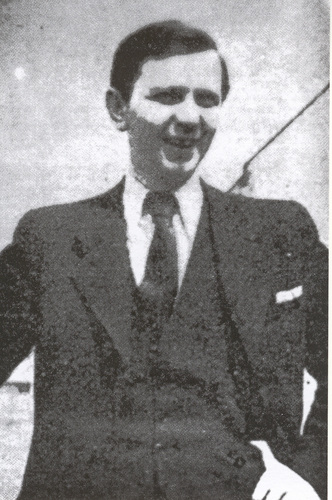
- Born: 22 December 1901; Bunić, Austria-Hungary
- Died: 22 July 1958 (aged 56); Belgrade, FPR Yugoslavia
- Occupation: Writer
- Writing career
- Period: 20th century
- Genres: Poetry, essay
- Literary movement: Dada

Dragan Aleksić (Serbian Cyrillic: Драган Алексић, 22 December 1901 – 22 July 1958) was a Serbian Dadaist poet, author, journalist and filmmaker. He was the founder of the Yugoslavian branch of Dadaism, termed "Yugo-Dada".

Born in a village in the region of Lika, Aleksić first published his poetry in several Zagreb-based youth magazines. During his year of studies in Prague in 1920, he came into contact with then leading European Dadaists such as Kurt Schwitters and Tristan Tzara.

In 1921, he met with Branko Ve Poljanski, the brother of Zenitist leader Ljubomir Micić, and collaborated with the two on several projects for a year. After his personal and artistic break with Poljanski in 1922, Aleksić published the two single issue Dadaist publications Dada Tank and Dada Jazz in Zagreb, while Poljanski published a parody of Dada called Dada-Jok. Aleksić gathered a circle of Dadaists with whom he participated in several "Dadaist Matinées".

In late 1922, he left for Belgrade where he edited the culture section in the magazine Vreme. Several side projects at the time include the lost film Kačaci u Topčideru, an American burlesque he recorded with Boško Tokin in 1924 and poetry he published in Monny de Boully's almanach Crno na belo.

During the occupation of Yugoslavia in World War II, Aleksić continued editing the culture section in the now collaborationist Novo Vreme. He was arrested by mistake and suffered a crippling back injury, leaving him bedridden until his death in 1958.

== Early life ==
Dragan Aleksić was born in Bunić near Korenica on 22 December 1901. He attended the gymnasium in Vinkovci, during which he first published his poetry in the Zagreb-based youth magazine Omladina in 1918, and in several other Croatian magazines during 1919.

== Studies in Prague ==
In October 1920, Aleksić enrolled at a Slavic languages program in Prague. There, he organized an event for several of his acquaintances, presenting his invention of "organic art" – orgart. After the event, he was informed of the Dada movement by one of his guests and came into contact with a member of the avant-garde theater group Revoluční scéna (The Revolutionary Scene).

Soon after, he came into contact with leading European Dadaists such as Kurt Schwitters, Raoul Hausmann, Walter Mehring, Richard Huelsenbeck, Max Ernst and Tristan Tzara. The Dadaists were given a translation of Aleksić's presentation of "orgart", to which they reacted positively, accepting it as a part of Dada.

After hearing of Aleksić, Branko Ve Poljanski left the art and theater scene in Slovenia and traveled to Prague via Vienna in April 1921 to meet with him. Together, they held a Dadaist event in Prague to public outcry, visited Lajos Kassák in Vienna, before settling in Zagreb where they collaborated on an early Yugoslav film magazine, Kinofon. Because of an administrative issue, Aleksić discontinued his studies in Prague after the summer of 1921.

== Collaboration with Zenit ==
Aleksić started publishing his poems in collaboration with Ljubomir Micić's avant-garde magazine Zenit. Despite initially dismissing the Dada movement in the 2nd issue of the magazine in March 1921, the following April issue contained an article by Dragan Aleksić written from Prague, as well as two of his Dadaist poems. Up to and including the 13th issue of Zenit, Aleksić's reviews and poems appeared in the magazine regularly.

Concurrent with his work with Zenit, he established a "purebred troop" of Dadaists, intending to develop the group into a movement. Aleksić notified Tzara of these developments in May 1922. Members of the troop included: Dragan Sremac, Vido Lastov, Slavko Stanić (Šlezinger), Mihailo S. Petrov, Antun Tuna Milinković (Fer Mill).

However, there was an abrupt break with Zenit in May 1922. The final words of the 14th issue announced the excommunication of Aleksić from the Zenitist circle, as well as the author Mihailo S. Petrov, also a regular contributor in the early issues of the magazine. The same issue announced an upcoming single issue periodical titled Dada-Jok, edited by Poljanski and parodying Dadaism.

== Dadaist activities ==
Aleksić organized several "Dadaist Matinées" during 1922. The first of these was organized in Novi Sad in June 1922, with the help of several Hungarian activists. Tzara was informed of these events via mail on 14 May 1922.

In response to the initial strikes by the Zenitists, Aleksić published two of his own single issue publications in Zagreb – Dada Tank in June and Dada Jazz in September 1922.

Dada Tank was published in collaboration with Tristan Tzara and Kurt Schwitters, including picture-poems and graphics by Mihailo S. Petrov, as well as a translation of a poem by Erwin Enders, originally published in the Hungarian avant-garde journal MA. Although Dada Jazz has been characterized as a mere footnote to Dada Tank, it was in fact a very different project. Its cover designated it to be a "Dada anthology", analogous to Richard Huelsenbeck's Dada Almanach, which Aleksić had translated and excerpted in Dada Tank. In the two publications, Aleksić analyzes Schwitters' Merz Dadaism, as well Vladimir Tatlin and Alexander Archipenko's ideas.

On 20 August 1922, Aleksić organized the second "Dadaist Matinée" in the Royal cinema in Osijek. He wrote about the matinée to Tristan Tzara on the same day, detailing that he was joined by eight other "dada-stars" who performed "8 Dramas with Real-tricks". In an article for the daily Hrvatska obrana on 21 August, the matinée was described as an inter-disciplinary interaction of painters and poets with elements of cabaret, music hall and circus performances, as well as propaganda film. The event included a Dadaist negation of Molière, Dostoevsky, Ibsen, Šenoa and Krleža. Aleksić held a general speech outlining Dada, claiming that the central elements of the movement were "denying logic" and "the element of surprise". According to Mihailo S. Petrov, the matinée was organized by Aleksić and himself, as well as Antun Milinković, Slavko Stanić (who booked the event hall), students of the Osijek Gymnasium Dragan Sremac and Zdenko Reich, the Russian emigrant Vido Lastov and three poets under the pseudonyms Jim Rad, Nac Singer and Mee Tarr.

A further two matinées were organized on 1 October in Vinkovci and on 3 November in Subotica, again with the help of Hungarian activists.

== Work in Vreme ==
Aleksić moved to Belgrade in late 1922, when he became editor of the culture section of Vreme. There, he wrote his art criticism, evaluating literature, cinema, theater and, until 1935, visual arts. During this time, Aleksić also collaborated with Misao, Hipnos and Tribuna in 1923, published poetry in Monny de Boully's almanach Crno na belo in 1924, in Večnost in 1926 and in Oktobar and Letopis matice srpske in 1928.

During Aleksić's time at Misao, literary critic Bogdan Popović published an article in 1923 against African sculpture, to which he likened Modern art. Alongside Velibor Gligorić, Aleksić published his rebuke to Popović's article, lauding African sculpture as a spontaneous, mystical and reflex-driven form of art. During this period, Aleksić wrote primarily on Constructivism, which he saw as a synthesis and next step in the evolution of all previous major modern art movements such as Impressionism, Expressionism and Cubism.

He collaborated with Boško Tokin in filming the silent film Kačaci u Topčideru ili Budi Bog s nama (Kachaks in Topčider or God Be With Us) in 1924, written by Branimir Ćosić. Filming was stopped when the negative caught on fire. The film was an imitation of American burlesque.

== WW2 and arrest ==
During the occupation of Serbia in WW2, Aleksić was initially employed at the collaborationist magazine Novo vreme, as editor of the culture section. Because of a misunderstanding, he was arrested by the Serbian Gestapo, held for five months and tortured, causing him to remain bedridden until death. At the request of his coworkers, he was released from prison. In 1944, he was part of the management of the Centrala za humor theater. The Yugoslav Partisans' Honor Court describes Aleksić as a "highly cultured" and "hardworking" journalist, saying "he behaved very honorably during the war, helping us out and never fully submitting to the collaborationist government or the occupiers".

== Later life and death ==
After the war, Aleksić remained bedridden and was unable to pursue his career in journalism. He remained in contact with a small circle of friends and collaborated with Radio Belgrade in the preparation of several radio dramas.

Dragan Aleksić died on 22 July 1958 in Belgrade. His personal archive was destroyed.

His death was commemorated with a short article in the review Film danas (Film Today), and in 1958 several of his poems were published posthumously in the magazine Književnost (Literature). After being included in two anthologies of poetry by editor Vasko Popa, Urnebesnik in 1960 and Ponoćno sunce (The Midnight Sun) in 1962, Aleksić's work was largely forgotten for several years. His complete work was published in 1978 by researcher Gojko Tešić under the title Dada Tank.

== See also ==
- Ljubomir Micić

== Sources ==
- Đurić, Dubravka; Šuvaković, Miško (2003). Impossible Histories: Historical Avant-gardes, Neo-avant-gardes, and Post-avant-gardes in Yugoslavia, 1918-1991. MIT Press. ISBN 9780262042161.
- Béhar, Henri (2005). Dada circuit total (in French). Lausanne: L'âge d'homme. pp. 333–348. ISBN 978-2-8251-1906-8.
- Suzana, Marjanić (July–September 2011). "Zenitističke večernje i dadaističke provokacije kao prvi hrvatski (teorijski) performansi" (PDF). Književna Republika (in Croatian). IX. Zagreb.
- Perić, Vladimir (2013). Autobiografska, socijalna i poetička margina dadaizma Dragana Aleksića (in Serbian). Kragujevac.
- Seely Voloder, Laurel; Miller, Tyrus (2013). "Avant-Garde Periodicals in the Yugoslavian Crucible" (PDF). The Oxford Critical and Cultural History of Modernist Magazines. 3. New York: Oxford University Press: 1099–1127.
- Jovanov, Jasna (2017). Dragan Aleksić – Likovne kritike (in Serbian). Novi Sad: Fondacija Vujičić kolekcija, Spomen-zbirka Pavla Beljanskog. ISBN 978-86-7035-394-7.
- Jovanov, Jasna M. (2018). Damjanović, Dragan; Magaš Bilandžić, Lovorka (eds.). "Dragan Aleksić as a Critical Interpreter of Art/Dragan Aleksić kao kritički tumač likovnosti". Imago, Imaginatio, Imaginable: Zbornik u čast Zvonka Makovića (in Serbian). Belgrade.
