= Dada Tank =

The cover of Dada Tank from June 1922.

Dada Tank was a Yugoslav Dadaist single issue publication published in Zagreb in June 1922 and edited by Dragan Aleksić. Aleksić published Dada Tank as a response to Branko Ve Poljanski and his brother Ljubomir Micić's anti-Dada publication Dada-Jok from May 1922.

== Background ==
After falling out with the representative of Dada in Yugoslavia, Dragan Aleksić, the Zenitists Branko Ve Poljanski and Ljubomir Micić published an anti-Dada single issue publication in May 1922 called Dada-Jok. Through a skillful, reflexive parody of the movement, the editor Poljanski sought to expose Dada's limits as an artistic and spiritual current, proposing Zenitism in its stead. As a response, Aleksić published two single-issue pamphlets of his own – Dada Tank in June and Dada Jazz in September 1922.

== Contents ==
Dada-Tank was a large-scale, eight-page folded sheet with a typographically bold dispersion of cover information in interrupted, alternating horizontal and vertical rows of letters. Inside, the two columns were divided by black lines, and programmatic texts by Aleksić touching upon various arts alternated with his own poems, as well as poems by other contributors including Tristan Tzara, Kurt Schwitters, Richard Huelsenbeck and the graphic artist Mihailo S. Petrov. The fourth page is covered entirely by a picture-text by Aleksić printed in irregular vertical columns up and down the page. Dada Tank also included the Hungarian-language poem Grčka Vatra (Greek Fire) by Erwin Enders, originally published in the May 1922 issue of Vienna-based MA.

In the first edition of Dada Tank, Aleksić used profane and obscene language, provoking the intervention of the state censors and leading to a second, censored edition being printed.

== Legacy ==
In the late 1960s, novelist Bora Ćosić published the first reprints of Dada Tank and Dada Jazz in the Neo-avantgarde pro-Fluxus magazine Rok.
