= Francisco Infante-Arana =

Russian artist

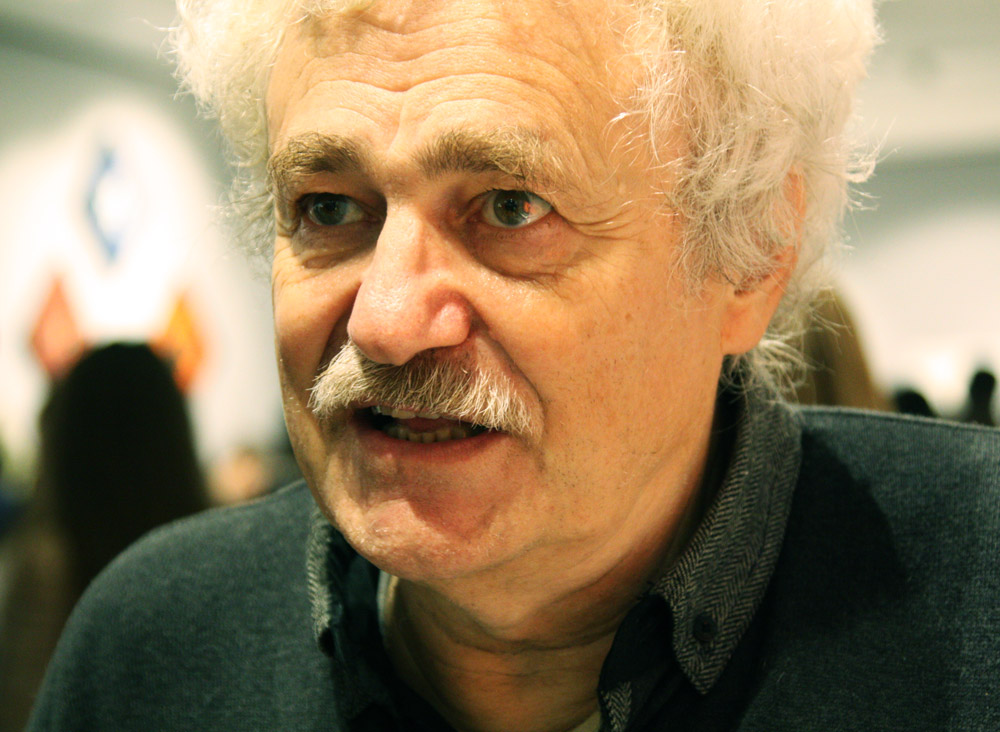
Francisco Infante-Arana in 2014

Francisco Infante-Arana (Russian: Франсиско Инфанте-Арана), born 1943 in Vasilievka, Saratov Oblast, Soviet Union) is a Russian artist.

== Background ==
Francisco Infante-Arana was born to a Spanish father and Russian mother, who raised him. Eventually he moved to Moscow and enrolled in the Moscow College of Decorative and Applied Arts. In the 1960s and early 1970s, he was a member of the artists' collective known as the Movement Group, founded by Lev Nussberg. He was and continues to be one of the premier Russian avant-garde artists. Some of his work is currently on display at the Cold War Modern exhibition at the V & A in London.

== Work's holders ==
- International Symposium in the Urals (1989), in Nepal (Kathmandu), Tibet (Lhasa, 2000), on Lake - (artists Francisco Infante-Arana and Nonna Goryunova, Alexander Evgenievich Ponomarev, Vladimir Nasedkin, Tatiana Badanina, Tishkov, Leonid, Shaburov, Alexander E., Porto, Ivan B., Chernyshev, Aristarchus A., Vladislav Yefimov, Batynkov, Konstantin, Olga Chernysheva)
