= Miloš Babić (disambiguation) =

Miloš Babić (born 1968) is a Serbian basketball coach and former player

Miloš Babić may also refer to:

- Miloš Babić (footballer) (born 1981), Bosnian-Herzegovinian football player
- Miloš Babić (artist) (1904–1968), Yugoslav artist

== See also ==
- Miloš Dabić (born 1969), Serbian football player
- Miloš Bajić (painter) (1915–1995), Serbian painter
- Miloš Bajić (born 1994), Bosnian football player
