= Bunić =

Bunić can refer to:

- House of Bunić, Croatian noble family
- Bunić, Croatia, village in Croatia.
