= Janez Vrečko =

Slovene literary historian and theorist

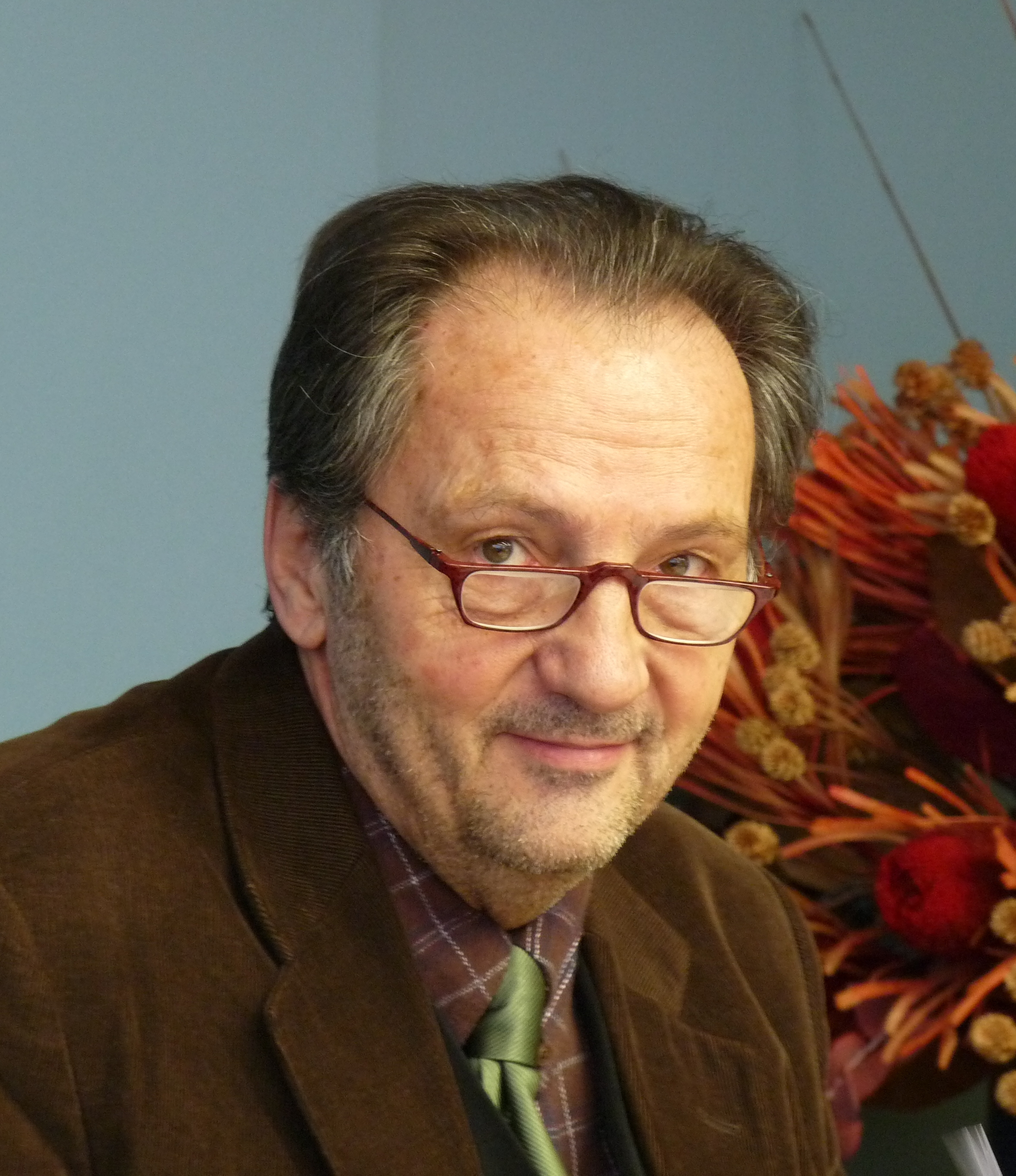
- Born: 1946 (age 79–80); Ljubljana, PR Slovenia
- Scientific career
- Fields: Literary history
- Workplaces: University of Ljubljana

Janez Vrečko (born 1946) is a Slovene literary historian and theorist.

== Life and work ==
He is a professor of comparative literature at the University of Ljubljana's Faculty of Arts. He received his PhD in 1986 for his dissertation entitled Slovenian Historical Avant-Garde and Zenitism. In 1978 he received an MA for his thesis on mimetic and non-mimetic poetics. In 1974 he received a Student Prešeren Award for his graduate thesis. He has been employed in the Department of Comparative Literature and Literary Theory since 1978.

He has spent more than two years researching or as a visiting lecturer at universities in Munich, Zagreb, Belgrade, Katowice, Salzburg, Brussels, St. Petersburg and Vienna. He has held visiting positions at the Universities of Nova Gorica, Koper and Maribor.

His fields of specialization in research and graduate teaching are European and Slovenian historical Avant-Garde. His extensive monograph on the Slovene avant-garde poet Srečko Kosovel (2011) brought new findings on the influence of Russian Constructivism on its wider European counterpart. His scholarship focuses on the history of the epic, tragedy and novel from Classical Antiquity onwards and on the basic literary concepts such as mimesis, catharsis and inspiration. He is concerned with the theory and history of European lyrics from Baudelaire onwards and with the European poetics from Aristotle to Brecht and Artaud. He is the recipient of the Gold Plaque from the University of Ljubljana, the Faculty of Arts Merit Award, the award of the Student Council of the Faculty of Arts for teaching work, the award of the Slovenian Research Agency for the best academic book of the years 2011 and 2014 and the State Zois Certificate of Recognition for scientific and research work in 2014.

== Selected works ==
Monographs

- Constructivism and Kosovel, 2015.
- Constructivism and Kosovel, 2015. (E-book)
- Konstruktivizm i Kosovel (Constructivism and Kosovel, in Russian), 2014.
- Ep in tragedija (The Epic and Tragedy), 2012. E-book.
- Srečko Kosovel, 2011.
- Med antiko in avantgardo (Between the Antiquity and the Avant-Garde), 2002.
- Atiška tragedija (The Tragedy of Attica), 1997.
- Ep in tragedija (The Epic and Tragedy), 1994.
- Srečko Kosovel, slovenska zgodovinska avantgarda in zenitizem (Srečko Kosovel, Slovenian Historical Avant-Garde and Zenitism), 1986.

Parts of monographs/articles

- Yugoslavia and its republics. Slovenia. Handbook of International Futurism. Ed. Günter Berghaus. Berlin/New York : Walter de Gruyter (forthcoming 2016).
- From two-dimensionality into infinity by Kosovel, 2014.
- Geometrizacija prostora in filozofija narave (Geometrization of Space and Philosophy of Nature), 2014.
- Tragični jezik epskega heroja Ahila (The Tragic Language of the Epic Heroe Achilles), 2014.
- Aristotelov posnetek kot posnetek v razliki (Aristotle's Mimesis as Mimesis of Difference), 2013.
- Ut pictura poesis in konsi. Pesem kot slika, pesem kot prostor – nesporazumi. (Ut pictura poesis and Conses. Poem as Picture, Poem as Space – misunderstandings), 2011.
- Prostorskost konsov in Tržaški konstruktivistični ambient / The Spatiality of the Cons and the Trieste Constructivist Cabinet, 2011.
- Oedipus and Joseph K, 2011.
- Filozofija predmeta, geometrija in fizika – konstruktivizem (The Philosophy of the Object, Geometry and Physics – Constructivism), 2010.
- Svetlobno-prostorska modulacija konsov in Moholy-Nagy (Light-space Modulation of Conses and Moholy-Nagy), 2010.
- Agamemnon med nujnostjo in svobodo (Agamemnon between Necessity and Freedom), 2009.
- Ojdip med sanjami in prerokbo (Oedipus between Dreams and Prophecy), 2008.
- Evripid kot mojster rituala in gledališča / Euripide – maestro della ritualita'e del teatro (Euripides as Master of Ritual and Theatre), 2007.
- Tibetanska in grška predtragična drama (Tibetan and Greek Pre-tragic Drama), 2005.
- Ojdipova kozmična in človeška bitka (Oedipus's Cosmic and Human Struggle), 2004.
- Kafka kot Sofoklov predhodnik (Kafka as Progenitor of Sofocles), 2003.
- Ignoranca preroštva v Kasandri (Disregarding the Prophecy in Cassandra), 2001.
- Goethejevo in Aristotelovo pojmovanje posnemanja / Mimesis bei Aristoteles und Goethe (Goethe's and Aristotle's Conception of Mimesis), 2000.
- Sofoklov Filoktet kot tragični Job (Sophocles' Philoctetes as the Tragic Job), 1996.
