= Šoškić =

Šoškić (Serbian: Шошкић) is a surname. Notable people with the surname include:

- Branislav Šoškić (1922−2022), Montenegrin politician, President of the Socialist Republic of Montenegro (1985−1986)
- Budislav Šoškić (1925−1979), Montenegrin politicianPresident of the People's Assembly of the Socialist Republic of Montenegro (1974−1979)
- Dejan Šoškić (born 1967), Serbian economist
- Ilija Šoškić (born 1935), Montenegrin visual artist and art theorist
- Milutin Šoškić (1937–2022), Serbian footballer
