= Aleksandr Ponomarev =

Aleksandr Ponomarev, or variants, may refer to:

- Aleksandr Ponomaryov (actor, born 1765) (1765–1831), Russian actor
- Aleksandr Ponomaryov (actor, born 1960) (born 1960), Russian actor
- Aleksandr Ponomaryov (artist, born 1953) (born 1953), Russian artist
- Alexander Ponomarev (artist) (born 1957), Russian artist
- Aleksandr Ponomarev (footballer, born 1918) (1918–1973), Soviet Ukrainian football player and manager
- Aleksandr Ponomaryov (footballer, born 1986), Russian football player

== See also ==
- Oleksandr Ponomariov (born 1973), Ukrainian singer
- Oleksandr Ponomaryov (politician) (born 1962), Ukrainian economist and politician
