= Pafama (Seissel) =

1922 painting by Josip Seissel

- Artist: Josip Seissel
- Year: 1922
- Medium: Oil on canvas
- Dimensions: 17 cm × 17 cm (6.7 in × 6.7 in)
- Location: Museum of Contemporary Art, Zagreb

Pafama, short for Papierfarbenmalerei, is a 1922 painting by Croatian painter Josip Seissel. This painting is the first known abstract composition in Croatian art. It is currently in the collection of the Museum of Contemporary Art, Zagreb.

== Name ==
Word Pafama is an abbreviation of the German PApier-FArben-MAlerei, (German: Paper, color, painting) which is a word from zenitism vocabulary, meaning that the artist focuses on the painting process and materials, a radical approach at the beginning of the third decade of the 20th century.

== Description ==
This is a square painting of small dimensions whose center is dominated by multi-colored geometric elements on a black background. It is based on the principles of suprematism and is reduced to primary geometric shapes - triangle, rectangle, polygon and cone. In addition, it is reduced to the primary colors - red, yellow, blue and their derivatives which are projected on a black background.

The painting is characterized by structural imaging techniques and is synonymous with European avant-garde art at the time. The painting marks the appearance of avant-garde art in Croatia and leaves lasting effects on the Croatian art in the 20th century and especially in the 1950s and 1960s, when neo-constructivism trends were formed. Its size is 17x17 cm.
