= Laudonov gaj =

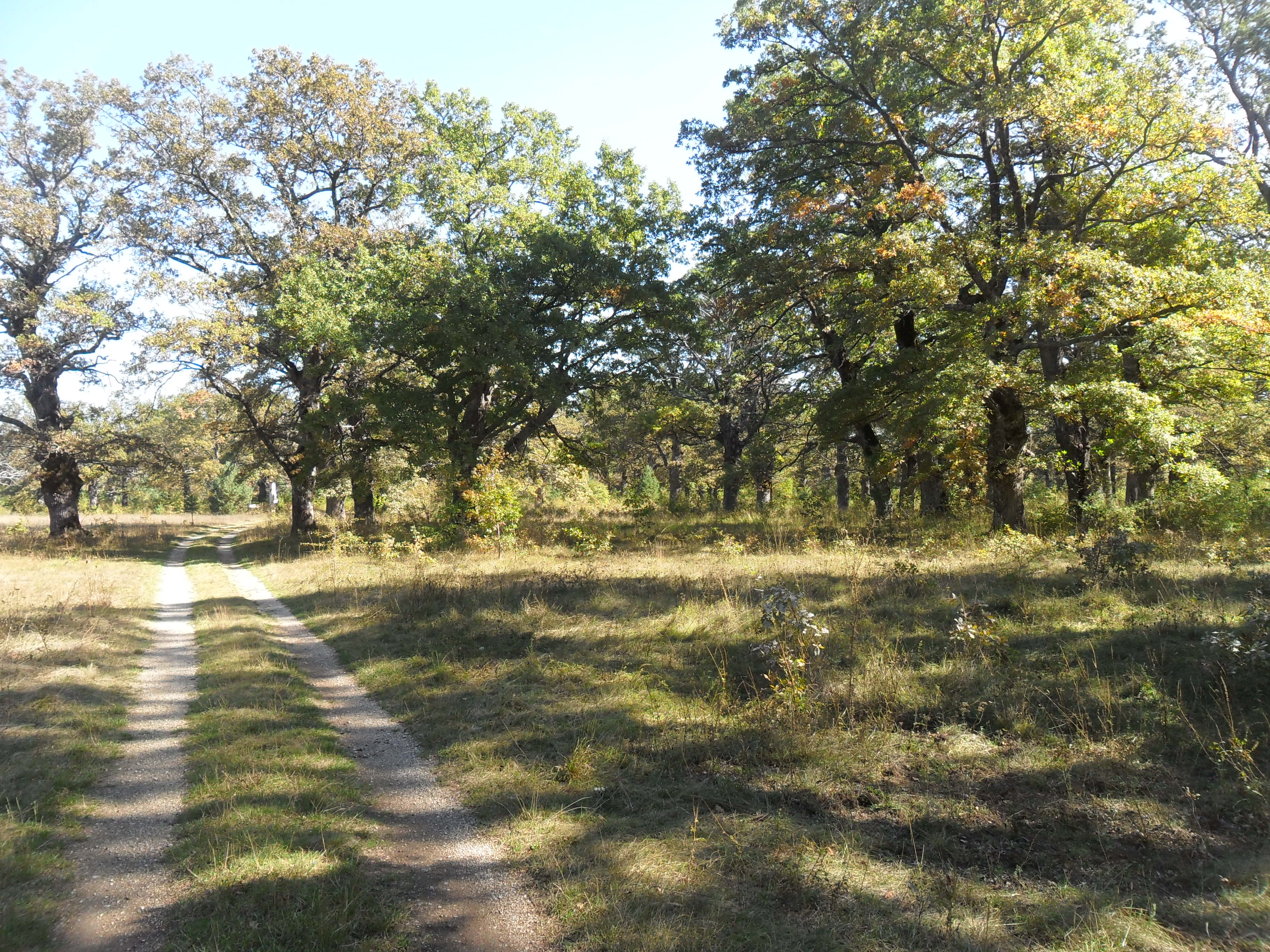
- Interactive map of Laudonov gaj

Geography
- Location: Udbina, Lika-Senj, Croatia
- Coordinates: 44°38′28″N 15°39′27″E
- Elevation: 628 m (2,060 ft)
- Area: 33.23 ha (82.1 acres)

Administration
- Status: Forest Reserve

Laudonov gaj (English: Laudon's grove) is a forest in Croatia near Bunić. Locals named it in honour of Ernst Gideon von Laudon, who ordered for oaks and pines to be planted on the quicksand in the area. It has an area of 33.23 ha and its elevation is between 628 and 641 m (2,060 and 2,103 ft).

== History ==
In 1746, captain (later general) Ernst Gideon von Laudon ordered for trees to be planted on a quicksand in the area, because of problems quicksand was making. About 10 000 seedlings per hectare were planted.

On 19 August 1942, the 2nd Lika Assault Brigade of Yugoslav Partisans was formed in Laudonov gaj.

In 1965, it was declared a forest reserve.
