= Viacheslav Koleichuk =

Russian sound artist and musician

Viacheslav Koleichuk (Russian: Вячеслав Колейчук; 16 December 1941 – 8 April 2018) was a Russian sound artist, musician, architect and visual artist. Koleichuk mainly made installation art that involves tensegrity. Sometimes these sculptures function as an experimental musical instrument during performances. Some of his works are part of the collection of the Kolodzei Art Foundation. He was a member of (Lev Valdemarovich Nussberg's) kinetic art movement Dvizhenie in the 60s.

== Bibliography ==
- Realta sovietica, No. 173/174, Agosto-Settembre, 1967, pp. 20–25
- Dusan Conecny, Kinetizmus, (book), 1970, "Pallas", Bratislava
- Dekorativnoje Iskusstvo, II/1980, pp. 3–11, Moscow
- Environment and Planning B, 1980, Volume 7, Programmed Form Generation in Design, by V. Kolejchuk, Pion Limited, 1980, Great Britain
- Vytvarna Kyltura, No.5, 1981, pp. 28–33, – Myslenky a modely Vjaceslava Kolejcuka, by M. Sokolov
- INTERPRESSGRAFIC No. 4, 1986, pp. 8–13, Hungary, Self-collage, by V.Kolejchuk
- Leonardo, Vol. 24, No. 1, 1991, pp. 41–47.
- Vyacheslav Koleychuk: The Dvizheniye Group: Toward a Synthetic Kinetic Art. Leonardo, Vol. 27, No. 5, 1994, pp. 433–436.
- Wind, World Interior Design, Winter 1991, No. 13, Japan, – V.Koleichuk
- Retrospektive 1965–1990. Exhibition in Kassel
- Photo Manifesto. Contemporary Photography in the USSR, (book), Stewart, Tabori & Chang edition, New York, 1991
