= Mirjana Rakić =

Croatian journalist

- Born: March 7, 1948 (age 77); Bunić, SR Croatia, SFR Yugoslavia
- Education: University of Zagreb, Faculty of Political Science
- Occupation: Retired
- Employer: HRT (1971–2012)
- Known for: Television presentation
- Spouse: divorced

Mirjana Rakić (born March 7, 1948) is a Croatian journalist.

== Biography ==
She spent most of her career in the editorials for foreign policy issues at TV Zagreb and later Croatian Radiotelevision. In 2005 she received the Maja Miles Prize for Journalism for her selection of topics that bring new and different sensibilities to the Croatian public space and raise the awareness about human rights and position of women at global level. In her career, among many others, she interviewed Yasser Arafat, Margaret Thatcher and Muammar Gaddafi.

The Croatian Parliament appointed Mirjana Rakić as president of the Council for Electronic Media and the director of the Agency for Electronic Media on February 1, 2014, with a mandate until February 3, 2019. Opposition MPs of the Croatian Democratic Union voted against the appointment of Rakić, claiming that she said that in her view Franjo Tudjman was a war criminal. Before she became head of the Agency for Electronic Media, Rakić was executive director of the Croatian Radiotelevision. Mirjana Rakić was openly supportive of Croatian membership in the European Union during the negotiation process for full EU membership. In an interview that she gave in December 2015 to the Croatian Journalists' Association she stated that in her career she never worked for commercial media outlets. In another interview Rakić said that she was an ethnic Serbian and a member of the League of Communists of Croatia, but nevertheless due to her professionalism managed to preserve her workplace in the last decade of the 20th century when many other colleagues for the same reasons lost their jobs. In 2015 Mirjana Rakić has held the position of President of the Mediterranean Network of Regulatory Authorities whose members are sent by national media regulatory bodies from Jordan, Israel, Lebanon, Cyprus, Turkey, Moldova, Greece, Republic of Macedonia, Albania, Kosovo, Serbia, Montenegro, Bosnia and Herzegovina, Croatia, Italy, Tunisia, France, Morocco, Spain and Portugal.

== Revocation of Z1 TV license and demonstrations ==
In January 2016, during Mirjana Rakić's mandate, the Council for Electronic Media punished Z1 Television suspending its concession for three days because of hate speech, after the journalist of the local television Marko Jurić warned the citizens not to walk near the Serbian Orthodox Cathedral of the Transfiguration of the Lord, because "their children could become victims of Četnik slaughter". Following the decision of the Council nationalist demonstrations were organized in which by police estimates about 5,000 people gathered, many of them shouting the Ustaša salute Za dom spremni while the leader of the protesters Velimir Bujanec gave a Četnik hat to Mirjana Rakić. The new vice-president of the Croatian Parliament Ivan Tepeš from the right-wing Croatian Party of Rights dr. Ante Starčević took also part in the demonstrations.
