= Mihajlo Petrov =

Mihajlo S. Petrov (1902–1983) was a Serbian-Yugoslavian avant-garde painter, graphic artist, illustrator, etcher, and art critic.

== Biography ==
After he completed his studies under the tutelage of Ljubomir Ivanović at the Arts and Crafts School and Milan Milovanović at the Royal Art School (Kraljevska umetnička škola) in Belgrade. Influenced by Yvan Goll, Dragan Aleksić and Ljubomir Micić, Petrov became involved with Zenit magazine which Micić first launched in 1921 in Zagreb and then in 1924 in Belgrade. The ideas communicated through the Zenit art review became known as Zenitism, a first notable art movement from the Balkans in Europe. He then went on to pursue further study in Vienna (1922), Krakow (1923) and the Académie des Beaux-Arts in Paris (1924–1925). Petrov was one of Zenit's most active associates in his first phase (1921), as well as its most ardent collaborator. He was also a collaborator with other avant-garde journals such as Dada Tank, and Út,

In 1924, Petrov was one of the youngest artists to have his paintings on display at the international exhibition in Belgrade which featured the works of more than 100 contemporary European artists. Petrov and two of his colleagues (Ivan Radović and Veljko Stojanović) had a great impact on the art scene in Belgrade from the 1920s right through the 1930s. His oeuvres date from 1915 until 1946.

== Works ==
- Autoportret [Self-Portrait], 1921, printed 1971. Linocut. Printed in Zenit 6 (1921).
- Današnji zvuk [The Sound of Today], 1921. Linocut. Printed in Zenit 6 (1921).
- Predeo [Landscape], 1921, printed in 1971. Linocut. Printed in Zenit 8 (1921).
- Ritam [Rhythm], 1921, printed 1971. Linocut. Printed in Zenit 10 (1921).
- Kompozicja II [Composition II], 1922, printed 1971. Linocut.
- Zenit [Zenith], 1922, printed in 1971. Linocut. Printed in Zenit 13 (1922).
- Zacarani krugovi [Vicious Circle], 1922, printed 1971. Linocut.
- Mostovi [Bridges], 1922, printed in 1971. Linocut.

== See also ==
- List of painters from Serbia
- Ljubomir Micić
