= Miloš Babić (artist) =

Miloš Babić (1904–1968) was a Yugoslav painter, illustrator, designer, graphic artist who studied the avant-garde movement with his circle of Zenit artists whose early work anonymity was not recognizable to the public at the time when it first began in Zagreb and Belgrade. Babić considered himself simply a painter engaged in graphic design in order to make a living and not starve while waiting for his work to sell. With the passage of time, his graphic design work became part of collections now held at the National Museum in Belgrade, Museum of Applied Arts in Belgrade and the Municipal Museum of Subotica.

== Biography ==
Miloš Babić was born in 1904 in Segedin, Austria-Hungary, where he enrolled in the School of Applied Arts, Department of Interior Architecture, in 1918, and graduated in 1921. He decided to move to Subotica in the same year, where he studied by drawing and other works of applied art. His career began to flourish in 1923 when he moved from Subotica to Belgrade. There he became a successful illustrator of magazine covers, advertisements, decorations, signboards and film posters for movie theatres. He was also successful as a painter and portrait painter. He collaborated on commissions through brothers Oto Bihalji-Merin and Pavle Bihali-Merin who owned an advertising agency Futur in Belgrade until 1927. Babić's best work is found in his advertising poster illustrations from the avant-garde Art Deco period of the 1930s in the collection of the Museum of Applied Arts, Belgrade, and his nine oil paintings in the Subotica City Museum. Influenced by German art school Bauhaus, colleagues Lajos Kassák, and Ljubomir Micić, Babić's own experience in international constructivism and the understanding of postulates of modern advertising, were the driving force during the height of his creative period (the late 1920s to World War II). His work covered all conventional forms of advertising (newspaper and cinema advertisements, promotional flyers, posters, labels for different products, and visual identity of companies such as brands.

Today Ваbić and his work are connected to the ideas of Arpad G. Balázs, an ethnic Hungarian artist who worked in Subotica at the same time as Babić. Babić's oil paintings were done in Subotica between 1927 and 1937 with the intent to be displayed at the Exposition Internationale des Arts et Techniques dans la Vie Moderne in Paris in 1937. The collection included: Day-and-night work; The Banner of Реасе (1930); Anarchist at work; Satan's dream or а Vision of а War (1936); Warrior; Dictator (1936); Pilots; Rocketstation, also known as Metropolis, Air Earth Maneuver. In all these pictures Babić integrated content that would correspond to his poster drafts, especially in Fritz Lang's expressionist film Metropolis, that had а great influence оn him and his peers.
