= Lev Nussberg =

Russian painter

Lev Valdemarovich Nussberg (Russian: Лев Вальдемарович Нуссберг; born 1937) (also known as Nusberg) is a Russian painter, and founder of Russian kinetic art.

Born in 1937 in Tashkent, Lev's father Waldemar reportedly was of German familial origin rumored of Nußberg gardeners, but the Von Nusbergs appear to at some point in history lost the aristocratic prefix "von". Waldemar, an architect, in 1938 was accused of "spying for a foreign power" and, following a quick Soviet era conviction, disappeared while incarcerated as a prisoner of a gulag in Urals. Lev's mother, born Raisa Bespalova, was a Russian singer. In the late 1940s, Nussberg moved to Leningrad. Nussberg graduated from the Moscow Art School 1905 (MSKhSh, 1951–58).

Nussberg is best known for being the founder and leader of the influential Dvizheniye Group (1962–78) whose members included Francisco Infante-Arana and Viacheslav Koleichuk. The aim of the Dvizheniye (Russian for "movement") collective was to create and develop in the 'bio-centric' movement the group essentially pioneered, called Игровые Бионик-кинетических Системы [playful bionic-kinetic systems]. He also founded the group Dynamik in Leningrad.

Nussberg emigrated to Germany in 1976. He held a number of exhibitions, in Düsseldorf and Paris (1976), Venice, Netherlands and London (1977), Bochum, Turin, Kassel, New York City (1978), and in Bochum (1979). In 1980 he moved to the United States.
