= Alexander Ponomarev (artist) =

Russian painter

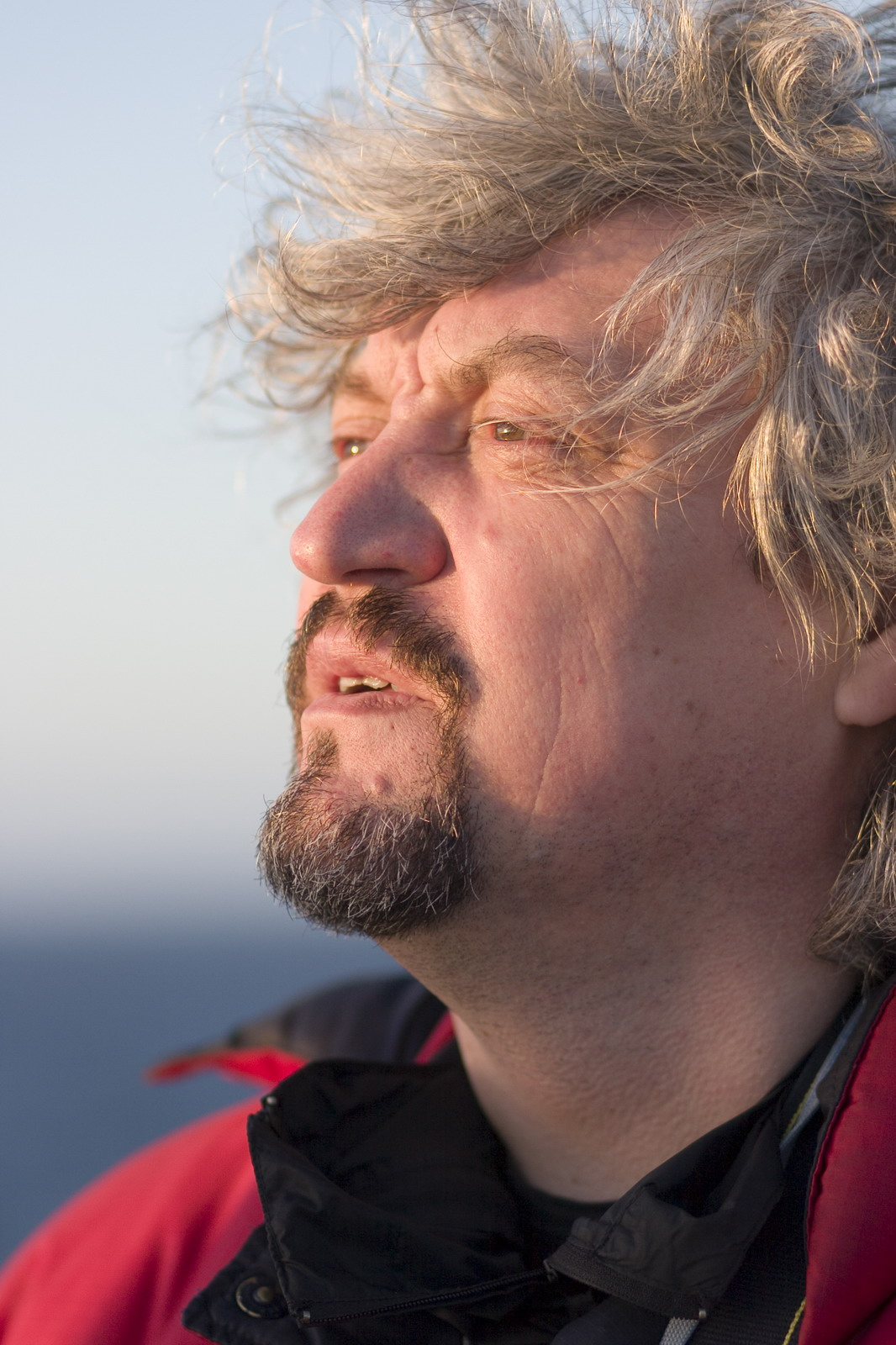
- Born: Alexander Evgenievich Ponomarev; 21 May 1957; Dnipropetrovsk, Ukrainian SSR, Soviet Union
- Website: ponomarev-art.com

Alexander Evgenievich Ponomarev (born 21 May 1957) is a Russian multidisciplinary contemporary visual artist. He was awarded the Ordre des Arts et des Lettres by the French Ministry of Culture "for merits in literature and art" in 2008.

== Biography ==
Ponomarev was born in 1957 in Dnipropetrovsk, Ukraine. In 1973 he graduated from the School of Fine Arts Orel (Russia). In 1979, he graduated from the Higher Engineering Marine School in Odesa. While serving in the naval fleets of Russia he carried out a number of artistic projects at sea, as well as in the Arctic, Greenland and Antarctica. He has been a member of the Moscow Union of Artists since 1992, a member of the International Union of artists of the Creative Union of Artists of Russia, and twice Fellow Mayor of Paris. Steipendiat Fund Alexander Calder (New York-Paris). Talk of the Moscow Biennale of Contemporary Art.

After leaving the navy, he spent more than 30 years carrying out more than 100 exhibitions and artistic projects in Russian and foreign museums, exhibition centers and galleries. His projects are accepted and supported by the State Tretyakov Gallery, the State Russian Museum, the Louvre Museum (France), the New National Museum of Monaco, the National Museum of Contemporary Art Georges Pompidou (France), the Museum of Science and Technology, Paris (France), the National Museum of Singapore, the art museums of Krasnoyarsk, Samara, Eagle and Yekaterinburg, the Art Museum of Picardie (France), the Centre for Contemporary Art Louise McBain (London), the Museum of Contemporary Art of the Grand Duke (Luxembourg), etc. He conducted a project as the chief artist of the Russian pavilion at the World Exhibition Expo 1998 in Lisbon (Portugal). At the invitation of the Ministry of Culture of France, he carried out a project in the Cathedral of San Luis Salpetriere in Paris.

In 2007, he represented the Russian Federation at the 52nd Biennial of Contemporary Art in Venice. In 2009, he implemented a special project, "Subtitsiano (Ascent submarine in the Grand Canal)" at the 53rd Biennial of Contemporary Art in Venice. He is a Corresponding Member of the Russian Academy of Arts. In 2016 he signed the pptArt Manifesto. In 2008 the French government named him an "Officer of the Order of Arts and Letters" (Officier d'ordre des Arts et des Lettres). As of 2008 he lives and works in Moscow.

== Holders of his works ==
- Collection of the Ministry of Culture
- State Russian Museum
- State Tretyakov Gallery
- National Museum of Modern Art. Georges Pompidou, Paris.
- FNAC (National Foundation for Contemporary Art), Paris.
- Thrace (Regional Fund for Contemporary Art), Brittany, France.
- Art Museum of Picardy, Amiens, France.
- Center for Contemporary Art, Moscow.
- Museum of Fine Arts Orel, Orel, Russia.
- Center for Art and Culture, Kiev.
- Collection of the Grand Duchess of Luxembourg, Luxembourg.
- National Museum, Singapore.
- Foundation F.R. Weisman, Los Angeles, USA.
- Judishes Museum Reihnsburg, Reynsburg, Germany.
- Zimmerli Art Museum, Rutgers University, New Brunswick, USA.
- Universitat Jaum I, Castellón de la Plana, Spain.
- Museum of Art, Nizhny Tagil, Russia.
- Museum of Art, Ekaterinburg, Russia.
- Art Museum, Krasnoyarsk, Russia.
- Private collections in Russia, France, Germany, Spain, Italy, Luxembourg, Singapore, USA, Poland, Denmark, Switzerland, Portugal.
- International Symposium in the Urals (1989), in Nepal (Kathmandu), Tibet (Lhasa, 2000), on Lake - (artists Francisco Infante-Arana and Nonna Goryunova, Vladimir Nasedkin, Tatiana Badanina, Tishkov, Leonid, Shaburov, Alexander E., Porto, Ivan B., Chernyshev, Aristarchus A., Vladislav Yefimov, Batynkov, Konstantin, Olga Chernysheva)

== Personal exhibitions ==
- 1990 - A joint project with A. Konstantinov. Hermitage Gallery, Moscow
- 1991 - Center for Contemporary Art, Moscow.
- 1991 - A joint project with E. Gorchakova. Gallery "East and West", Copenhagen.
- 1992 - Gallery Espai 29, Castellón de la Plana, Spain.
- 1993 - Gallery "February 6", Valencia, Spain.
- 1996 - Gallery "Cinema", Moscow.
- 1996 - "Ship Sunday." The State Tretyakov Gallery, Moscow.
- 1998 - "Breath of the Ocean." World exhibition "Expo 1998" in Lisbon, Portugal.
- 1998 - Contemporary Art Center of the Soros Foundation, Moscow.
- 2001 - Gallery "Palette", Kharkov, Ukraine.
- 2001 - "Maya. Lost Island." "Krokin Gallery", Moscow.
- 2002 - "Smoke without Fire." Museum Andrei Sakharov, Moscow.
- 2002 - "Memory of Water." Science and Technology Museum, Paris.
- 2003 - "Recycling of Schools", Phase 1, the project "Base."
- 2003 - The residence of the Ministry of Culture of France, Atelier Calder, Sasha, France.
- 2003 - "Recycling of Schools", step 3, the project "What Depth? What Depth!". Exhibition Hall, Tours, France.
- 2004 - Center for TNT, Bordeaux, France.
- 2005 - "Topologiya absolute zero", 1st Moscow Biennial of Contemporary Art, a special project. Moscow.
- 2005 - "North Trail of Leonardo." Gallery Nina Lumer, Milan, Italy.
- 2005 - Gallery Rabouan-Moussion, Paris.
- 2005 - Monument Artifacts Jules Verne in the Bay of the Somme, the project. Exhibition Hall Kortua, France.
- 2006 - "In the Garden with Wolf Packs," the Louvre project. Tuileries Garden, FIAC 2006, Paris.
- 2006 - "Narcissus Vice Versa." Centre for Contemporary Art "Granit", Belfort, France.
- 2007 - 52d Biennale in Venice, projects for the Russian pavilion, Italy.
- 2007 - "The Parallel Vertical", the central project of the 36th issue of the Autumn Festival. Salpetrier Cathedral, Paris.
- 2007 - "The Secret Channel", a special project, the second Biennial of Contemporary Art in Moscow.
- 2008 - "Surface Tension". Gallery Cueto Project, New York
- 2008 - "Point of View." Gallery Nina Lumer, Milan, Italy.
- 2008 - "Exit to the Surface." MNMN (New National Museum of Monaco), Monte Carlo.
- 2009 - "Subtiziano." 53d Biennale of Contemporary Art in Venice. Curator Victoria Golembiovskaya for RNA foundation.
- 2009 - «Sub-Zero». Studio Wolfe von Lenkiewicz, London.
- 2009 - "Feedback". 3rd Biennial of Contemporary Art (Moscow)
- 2014 - "Voice in the Wilderness". at 31° 26'N 08° 10'W in Agafay Desert for the 5th Biennale of Marrakech (Morocco)

== Actions and performances ==
- 1995 Campaign Ship Sunday. Baltic Sea.
- 1996 The object-action "North Trail of Leonardo." The Arctic Ocean.
- 2000 Campaign "Maya. Lost Island." Barents Sea.
- 2001 "Journey from Nepal to Tibet." The Himalayas.
- 2003 Action-performance "Cruise". Contemporary Art Festival Art-Klyazma, Moscow Region, Russia.
- 2003 The object-action "Utilization of Schools" Step 3. "What Depth? What Depth!". The River Loire, Tours, France.
- 2003 The project "Recycling of Schools", Phase 2, the object-action "Mobile in Mobile". Implementation of the action in the Mediterranean (Thessaloniki, Kasis, Marseilles, Sagunto, Valencia).
- 2003 "The Floating Art Studios." The project of the association "Apollonia", Strasbourg, France.
- 2004 Campaign "Topologiya Absolute Zero." Ship "Akademik Sergei Vavilov", ship "Akademik Ioffe", Antarctica.
- 2005 Campaign "Bad Post". Southern Ocean.
- 2006 Campaign "Baffin Figure." Ship "Akademik Ioffe", Baffin Bay, the Arctic.
- 2006 Campaign "Deep Graphics." Ship "Akademik Ioffe", Baffin Bay, the Arctic.

== See also ==
- List of Russian artists
