= Josip Seissel =

Croatian artist

Josip Seissel (Jo Klek)
- Born: 10 January 1904; Krapina, Austria-Hungary (today's Croatia)
- Died: 19 February 1987 (aged 83); Zagreb, Yugoslavia (today's Croatia)
- Education: Academy of Fine Arts, Munich
- Known for: painting, graphic art
- Notable work: Pafama
- Movement: surrealism, constructivism

Josip Seissel (10 January 1904 – 19 February 1987) was a Croatian architect and urban planner, who under the pseudonym of Jo Klek was a constructivist artist, graphical designer and theatrical designer. A member of the influential avant-garde Zenit movement of the 1920s, he is considered to be a pioneer of surrealism and abstract art in Croatia.

In 1969, he received the Vladimir Nazor Award for lifetime achievement in architecture.

== Biography ==
Josip Seissel was born on January 10, 1904, in Krapina, then in Austria-Hungary, now Croatia.

Under the name Jo Klek, Seissel was a major contributor to the avant-garde Zenit movement between 1922 and 1925. From his youth, Seissel had been interested in the theatre. He began as a self-taught artist creating drawings, temperas, watercolours and theatrical designs for Zenit productions, including set designs, costumes and posters. From 1921 he began using the pseudonyms Jo Klek and Josip Klek for his artwork. In 1922 he was one of the founders of the group Traveler (Traveleri). He represented Zenit at international exhibitions in the 1920s (Belgrade, Bucharest, and Moscow),

Seissel studied at the Technical Faculty in Zagreb under H. Ehrlich, earning a degree in architecture in 1929. He worked at the Department for the Regulation of Zagreb (Odsjeku za regulaciju grada Zagreba), and later became the director of the School of Applied Arts (Obrtne škole). Following the Second World War, he worked at the Ministry of Construction (Ministarstvu građevina), and from 1965 was a professor at the Faculty of Architecture at Zagreb University.

In 1937 he received the Grand Prix and the Order of the Legion of Honor from the French government for designing the Yugoslav pavilion for the World Exhibition in Paris.

In 1962 Seissel became a full member of the Croatian Academy of Sciences and Arts.

In 1969, he received the Vladimir Nazor Award for lifetime achievement in architecture.

Josip Seissel died on February 19, 1987, in Zagreb.

== Legacy ==
As an architect, Seissel was involved in urban planning for parts of Zagreb, as well as studies for other regions such as Makarska, Baško Polje, Šibenik, Mljet and Nikšić. In addition, he worked on plans for Miroševac cemetery, Maksimir Park, Plitvice Lakes and other projects. As a teacher at the Zagreb Faculty of Architecture, he influenced the next generations of urban planners.

In addition to his career as an architect, Seissel was active in the avant-garde art movement in Zagreb from the 1920s, most notably related to Zenit magazine. As Jo Klek, his designs are considered to be the beginning of Croatian constructivism, and his collage "Pafama" in 1922, is considered to be the first abstract (non-representational) of Croatian modern art. This work had a long-lasting impact on Croatian art of the 20th century, especially during the later neo-constructivist movements of the 1950s and 1960s.

Seissel used collage and montage techniques to create his designs without reference to historical or literary subjects. He experimented with geometric forms, creating abstract shapes and exploring spaces. His constructivist forms have geometrical designs and interlocking planes, for which he used modern transparent materials that allowed light to become a contributing element. By the 1930s, Seissel's art was approaching surrealism.

Seissel's collage "Parfama" (1922) is an early example of how he combined the constructivist elements of form, colour, space and material. The name Pafama is an abbreviated form of the German Papier-Farben-Malerei, meaning Paper-Colour-Painting.

As an illustrator, Seissel was responsible for the graphic design and layout of some editions of Zenit magazine, the constructivist design of Marijan Mikac's books, and he also created the Zenit exhibition poster.

Much of Seissel's art uses words to convey an ironic message, and his use of humour was a distinctive characteristic of his work. His mainly surrealist art, created over half a century includes drawings, watercolours, pastels, tempera and collages. His best-known series consists of 19 verbo-visual works in watercolour, ink and tempera called 3C i tričarije (a play on words that is difficult to translate).

In 1987 Seissel's widow, Silvana Seissel, donated a substantial body of his artistic works from his surrealist period, including paintings, drawings and posters to the Museum of Contemporary Art, Zagreb. The museum already had in its collection some major works from his earlier Zenit period created under the name Jo Klek. In 1992, a further bequest added his architectural, urban planning and written works. In total, the collection consists of around 3,000 works, spanning his careers both in art and architecture from the 1920s up until his death in 1987.

== Works ==
Works include

- Zenit magazine artwork (1922–25)
- Zenit theatre set designs, costumes, posters (1922–25)
- 3C i tričarije
- Self Portrait, 1918
- Pafama, collage, 1922
- Balkanac calm, 1922
- Rooster on the Roof, 1922
- Ex Libris Plavsic, 1922
- Wine shops 1924
- Travelling city, urban planning drawing 1932

== Exhibitions ==
During his lifetime, he exhibited his work in solo and group shows, most notably during the 1920s with the Zenit group.

=== Solo exhibitions ===
Recent exhibitions of his work include:

- 1997 Josip Seissel: Nadrealističko razdoblje [J.S.: The Surrealist Period] Visual Artists' Centre (HDLU) in Zagreb and at the Museum of Contemporary Art, Zagreb

=== Group exhibitions ===
- 2007 Avangardne tendencije u Hrvatskoj – Galerija Klovićevi dvori, Zagreb

=== Public collections ===
His work can be found in the following public collections

- Museum of Contemporary Art, Zagreb, Croatia
