= Ilija Šoškić =

Montenegrin-Yugoslavian-Italian visual artist and art theorist

Ilija Šoškić (Cyrillic: Илија Шошкић; born 1935) is a Montenegrin-Yugoslavian-Italian visual artist and art theorist. He was one of the pioneers of the new art forms in Yugoslavia in the 1960s. His art belongs to the conceptual tradition and covers performance art, video and installation art. Before turning to art, Šoškić was an athlete. He is the Montenegro record holder in hammer throw set in 1962.

== Biography ==
Ilija Šoškić was born in 1935 in Dečani, Kingdom of Yugoslavia and was raised in Montenegro. He graduated from the High School of Art in Herceg Novi. Before turning to art, Šoškić was an athlete. He is the Montenegro record holder in hammer throw with 57.89m throw set on 25 June 1962.

Šoškić studied at the Academy of Fine Arts in Belgrade (capital of Yugoslavia), where he took part in the 1968 student demonstrations. Because of this and his radical leftist ideas, Šoškić was in conflict with the Yugoslavian communist authorities, so he left Yugoslavia in 1969 and settled in Bologna, Italy. In 1972, he moved to Rome where he has lived ever since. In Italy, Šoškić took part in the Arte Povera movement. In the late 1980s, Šoškić moved back to Yugoslavia, first to Dubrovnik, then when the Croatian War of Independence broke up in 1991, he moved with his family to Budva.

== Gallery ==
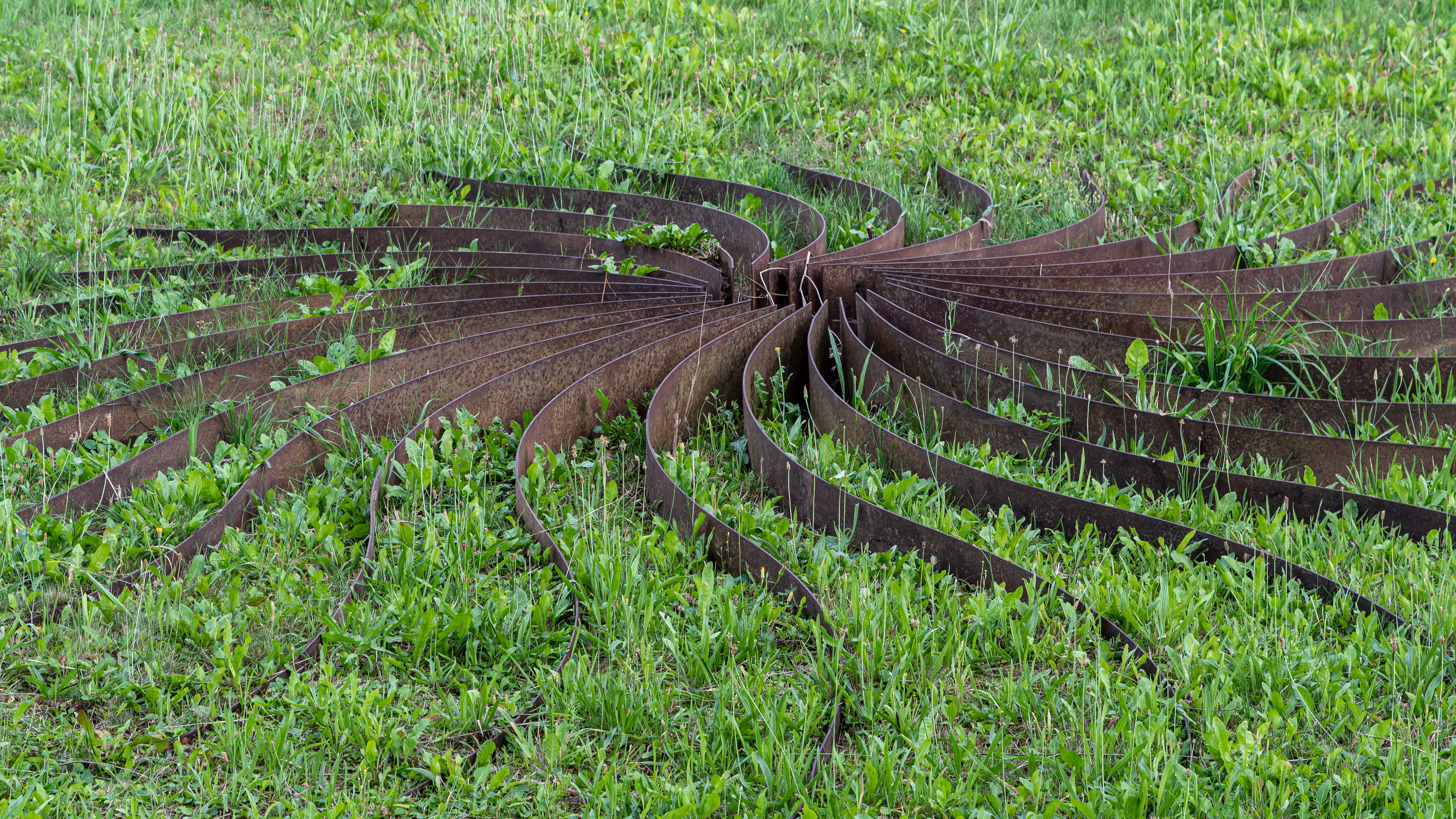
Sole d´acciaio by Šoškić in the Österreichischer Skulpturenpark, Premstätten

== Sources ==
- Kovačević, Miona (13 October 2018). "Ilija Šoškić - OD GERILE DO METAFIZIKE Jedinstvena izložba u Beogradu i Novom Sadu" (in Serbian). Blic.
- "Ilija Šoškic". Venice International. 2012.
- "Akcione forme - Retrospektivna izložba Ilije Šoškić, MSUB i MSUV". Museum of Contemporary Art. 12 October 2018. Archived from the original on 17 October 2018.
