= Monny de Boully =

Franco-Serbian writer and poet

- Born: Solomon Buli; 27 September 1904; Belgrade, Kingdom of Serbia
- Died: 29 March 1968 (aged 63); Paris, France
- Occupation: Writer
- Writing career
- Period: 20th century
- Genre: Poetry
- Literary movement: Surrealism

Monny de Boully (1904 in Belgrade – 1968 in Paris in a taxi) was a Franco-Serbian writer and poet.

== Surrealist poet ==
Born into a family of Serbian Sephardic bankers, as Solomon Buli, de Boully was educated in Belgrade. He participated in the research of the Yugoslav avant-gardes.

He arrived in Paris in 1925, where he met André Breton, Louis Aragon and Benjamin Péret. He published one text in the publication La Révolution surréaliste. In 1928, he created with Arthur Adamov and Claude Sernet the magazine Discontinuité which will have only one issue and participated in issues two and three of the Grand Jeu magazine.

Paulette Grobermann (1903-1995), wife of Armand Lanzmann (both parents of Claude Lanzmann and Jacques Lanzmann), left her husband for the love of Monny de Boully.

In 1943, Jean Rousselot saved Monny de Boully and his wife Paulette, arrested by the Gestapo.

== Work ==
- 1991: Au-delà de la mémoire, EST-Samuel Tastet Éditeur
