= Bunić, Croatia =

Bunić Bunić (Croatian)
- Village (Selo)
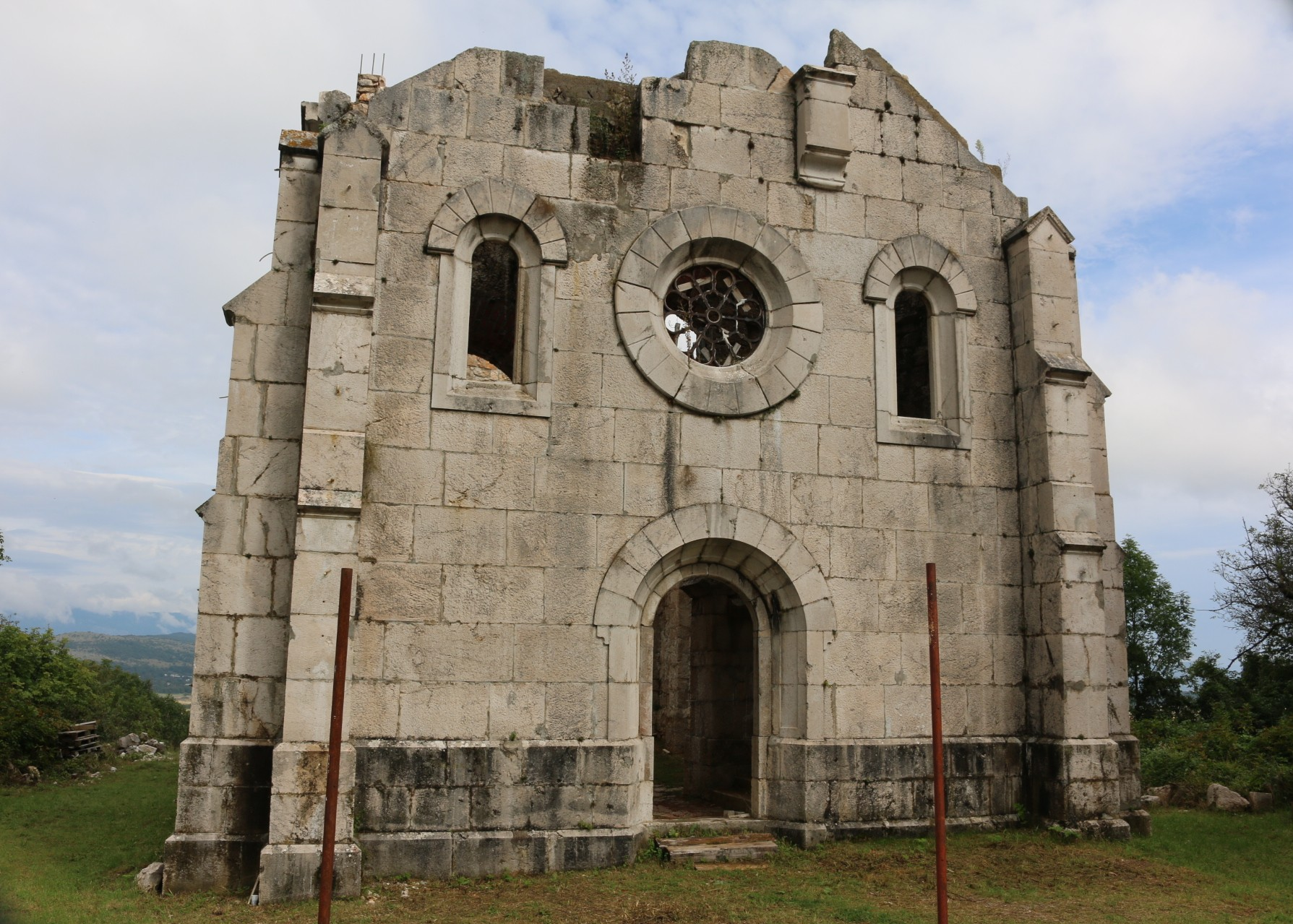
- The church in Bunić was destroyed in World War II

- Location within Croatia Bunić (Europe)
- Coordinates: 44°40′17″N 15°36′41″E
- Country: Croatia
- County: Lika-Senj
- Municipality: Udbina

Area
  - Bunić: 63.6 km^{2} (24.6 sq mi)

Population (2021)
  - Bunić: 96
  - Density: 1.5/km^{2} (3.9/sq mi)
- Time zone: UTC+1 (CET)
  - Summer (DST): UTC+2 (CEST)
- Postal code: 53235
- Area code: +385(0)53
- Car plates: GS

Bunić is a village in Lika, Croatia, located in the Udbina municipality, between Korenica and Lički Osik. According to the 2021 census, the village has a population of 96 inhabitants.

== History ==
The 1712–14 census of Lika and Krbava registered 2,058 inhabitants, of whom 2,051 were Vlachs, and 7 were "Turks".

In 1743 Ernst Laudon an Austrian generalissimo built a church to commemorate his children who died and were buried in Bunić and in 1746 he planted an oak forest now called by his name.

The place was heavily damaged in the Second World War by the Croatian Ustaše who expelled and erased most Serbs, and greatly damaged the church.

The population was 133 as of the 2011 census.

== Notable natives and residents ==
- Dragan Aleksić, artist
- Mirjana Rakić, journalist
- Rade Šerbedžija, actor
