= Tatiana Badanina =

Russian visual artist

- Born: 16 November 1955; Nizhny Tagil, Sverdlovsk Region, Russia, USSR
- Website: nasedkin-badanina.com

Tatiana Vasilyevna Badanina (born 1955, in Nizhny Tagil, Sverdlovsk Region, Russia) is a Russian visual artist.

== Biography ==
Tatiana Badanina was born in 1955 in Nizhniy Tagil in the Ural region of Russia. She studied fine art at the Graphic Art Faculty of Nizhniy Tagil State Teacher's Training College between 1973—1978 and begun participating in art exhibitions in 1978. She taught at Nizhniy Tagil State Teacher's Training College between 1978 – 1991 She has been living and working in Moscow since 1997. She is an honorary Member of the Russian Academy of Arts.

== Exhibitions ==
- 1991 Painting. Union Gallery, Moscow, Russia (jointly with V. Nasedkin and S. Brukhanov)
- 1993 Nizhniy Tagil State Museum of Fine Arts, Nizhniy Tagil, Russia
- 1993 Yekaterinburg Museum of Fine Arts, Yekaterinburg, Russia (jointly with V. Nasedkin)
- 1995 Yekaterinburg Museum of Fine Arts, Yekaterinburg, Russia
- 1996 Kino Gallery, Cinema Centre, Moscow, Russia
- 1997 Kino Gallery, Moscow, Russia
- 1999 Graphic Centre of the Artist's Union, Vilnius, Lithuania
- 1999 Kaliningrad State Art Gallery, Kaliningrad, Russia (jointly with V. Nasedkin and N. Zarovnaya)
- 1999 RosIzo Gallery, Moscow, Russia
- 2002 The Russian Gallery, Tallinn, Estonia
- 2003 Wings. Sam Brook Gallery, Moscow, Russia
- 2004 Skies. Masters Gallery, Moscow, Russia
- 2005 Protective Veil. Action. Serafimo-Znamenskiy Skete. Moscow Region, Russia
- 2007, Movement. Evolution. Art (group), The Ekaterina Cultural Foundation, Moscow
- 2007 White Garments. Serafimo-Znamenskiy Skete. Moscow Region, Russia
- 2007 Protective Veil. Materia Prima Gallery, Moscow, Russia
- 2009 TRANZIT, Оber-gallery, Kent, USA (jointly with V. Nasedkin)
- 2010 White Garments, Maris-Art Gallery, Perm, Russia
- 2012 proSVET (about light). Kultproject Gallery. Moscow, Russia
- 2012 White Garments. Dedication...All-Russian Decorative – Applied and Folk Art Museum, Moscow, Russia
- 2014, Are You Ready To Fly? (group), Moscow Museum of Modern Art
- 2016, The Geometry of Light (joint), Erarta Museum of Contemporary Art

== Collections ==
- The State Hermitage Museum, Saint-Petersburg, Russia
- Erarta Museum of Contemporary Art, St. Petersburg
- The State Tretyakov Gallery, Moscow, Russia
- The State Russian Museum, Saint-Petersburg, Russia
- The State Museum of Oriental Art, Moscow, Russia
- The State Central Museum of Contemporary History of Russia, Moscow, Russia
- Moscow Museum of Modern Art, Moscow, Russia
- The Jane Voorhees Zimmerli Art Museum, Rutgers University. New Brunswick, USA
- The Ekaterina Cultural Foundation, Moscow, Russia

== Bibliography ==
- New album of graphics.1991. (ISBN 5-269-00080-6). Moscow
- The First Ural Print Art Triennial. 1995. (ISBN 5-87308-077-1). Ufa
- Die Kraft der Stille. Junge Kunst aus Rusland". 1996.(ISBN 3-922805-55-8). Hildesheim. Deutschland
- Inter-kontak-grafik’98. LABYRINT".1998. (ISBN 80-902258-0-2). Prague.
- Abstract Art of Russia. ХХ century. 2001.(ISBN 978-5-93332-059-3). Saint-Petersburg
- Russian Gallery. 2004. (ISBN 9949-10-520-X). Tallinn, Estonia.
- Collage in Russia. ХХ Century. 2005. (ISBN 5-93332-188-5). Saint-Petersburg
- Female Artist of Moscow. Pathway in Arts, 2005 (ISBN 5-98179-022-9) Moscow.
- XX Century Drawing. The State Tretyakov Gallery. 2006 (ISBN 5-93221-105-9). Moscow
- Materials Revision. Catalogue (State Tretyakov Gallery) 2006. Moscow
- Different Reality - International Festival of Contemporary Arts. 2006. (ISBN 5-7114-0285-4). Magnitogorsk
- Movement. Evolution. Art. Ekaterina Cultural Foundation. 2007. (ISBN 978-5-91002-018-8). Moscow
- New Angelarium, Catalogue. Moscow Museum of Modern Art. 2007. Moscow
- In Transition Russia 2008. 2008. (ISBN 978-9963-8932-2-5). Moscow
- The First Ural Industrial Biennial of Contemporary Art. 2010 (ISBN 978-5-94620-071-4). Yekaterinburg
- Memento Mori.2011. (ISBN 978-5-91378-048-5). Arkhangelsk
- Artists Union. Sverdlovsk-Yekaterinburg. 2011 (ISBN 978-5-85383-466-8).Yekaterinburg
- Ural GRAFO. 2012 (ISBN 978-5-85383-492-7). Yekaterinburg
- 848. Jorge Machare and Nadya Volkonskaya Collection. 2012 г. (ISBN 978-5-91373-056-5). The State Hermitage. Saint-Petersburg * 20th Century. The beginning of drama. 2012 (ISBN 978-5-98181-081-7). Moscow
- Tvorchestvo (Creative work) Magazine № 7, 1988. A battle within us - article by T. Badanina
- Iskusstvo (Art) Magazine № 2, 1990. Nizhniy Tagil. T. Badanina and V. Nasedkin - article by V. Konstantinova
- Nauka v Rossii (Science in Russia) Magazine № 1, 2000. All is understood in comparison with the opposite - article by S. Khromchenko.
- Sobranie (Collection) Magazine № 2, 2004. An article by Igor Terekhov
- Decorativnoe Iskusstvo (Decorative Art) Magazine № 1, 2004. Image of flying - article by Vera Dazhina
- Decorativnoe Iskusstvo (Decorative Art) Magazine № 3, 2006. Overcoming the resistance of materials - article by V. Magomedova
- Decorativnoe Iskusstvo (Decorative Art) Magazine № 7, 2007. Through the wings of an angel - article by V. Magomedova
- Decorativnoe Iskusstvo (Decorative Art) Magazine № 2, 2009. Metamorphoses of the Wonderland - article by A. Sapronenkova
- Decorativnoe Iskusstvo (Decorative Art) Magazine № 3, 2009. I am working with Sky -article by Vera Dazhina
- Decorativnoe Iskusstvo (Decorative Art) Magazine № 4, 2012. T.Badanina's «ProSvet»(About light) in Kultproject – article by S. Terekhova
- Decorativnoe Iskusstvo (Decorative Art) Magazine № 5, 2012. Tatiana Badanina. White Metaphysics - article by V. Patsukov

In 2008, TATLIN published a book about the work of Tatiana Badanina (ISBN 978-5-903433-056), Editor: Anna Lengle, 200 pages, 22.0х28.5 см, 110 illustrations, hard cover, text in Russian/English.

== See also ==
- List of Russian artists
