= Branko Ve Poljanski =

Serb poet and painter

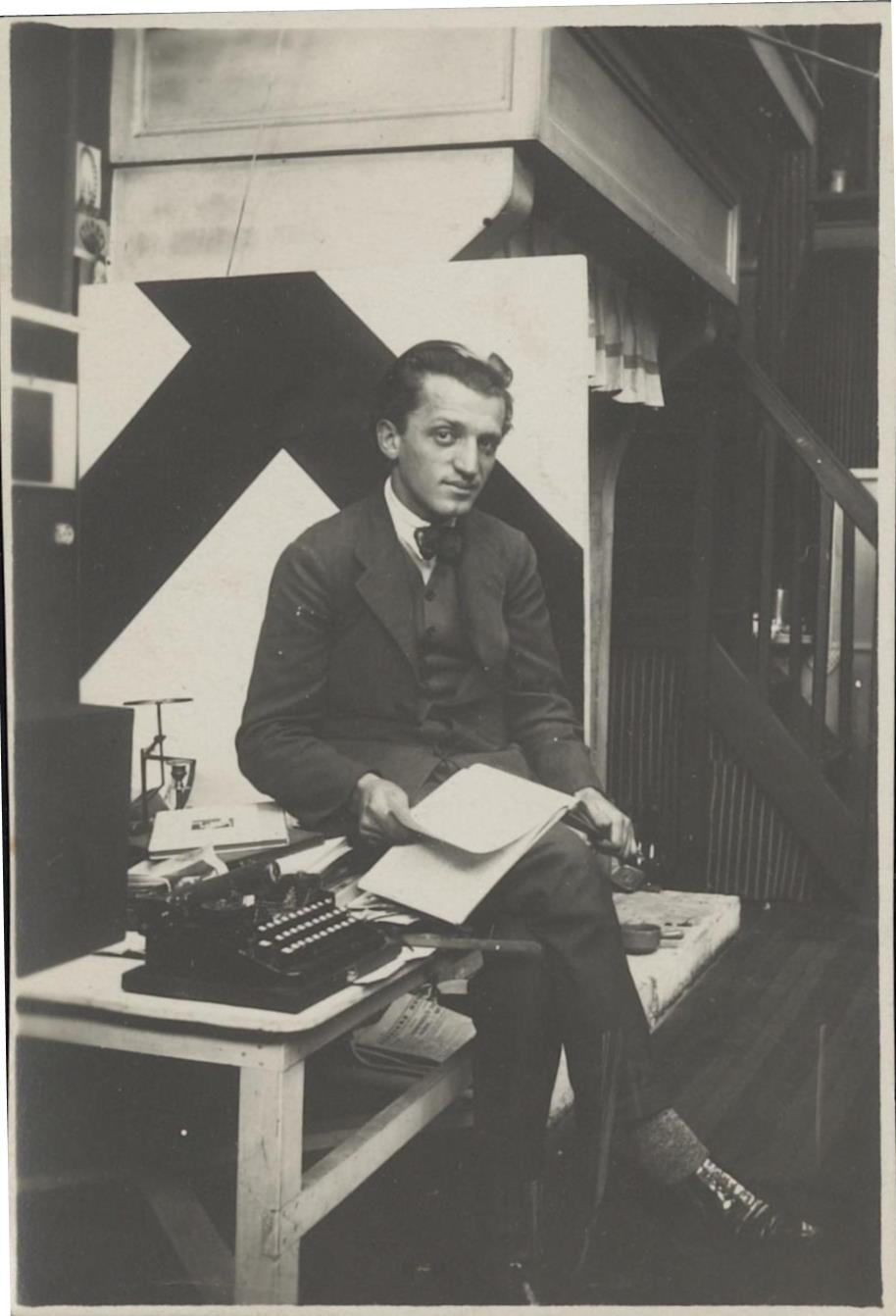
Branko Ve Poljanski (1920s)

Branko Ve Poljanski (pseudonym of Branislav Micić, 22 October 1898 – 14 January, 1947 ) was a Serb poet and painter active in the Serbo-Croat avant-garde. He was the co-founder of the avant-garde movement Zenitism and its magazine Zenit.

== Biography ==
He was born Branislav Micić in Austro-Hungarian Empire's part of nowadays Croatia, Sošice. Both he and his brother, Ljubomir Micić became prominent avant-garde artists. Branko qualified as teacher in Zagreb and moved to Ljubljana where he founded Svetokret journal in 1921. He then moved first to Vienna and then Berlin, where he got involved with Der Sturm, the Avant-garde magazine published by Herwarth Walden.

He married a French woman, with whom he had four children. He did not publish anything after 1940, and he died in 1947, in Recloses, France.
