= Ljubomir Micić =

Serbian writer and editor (1895–1971)

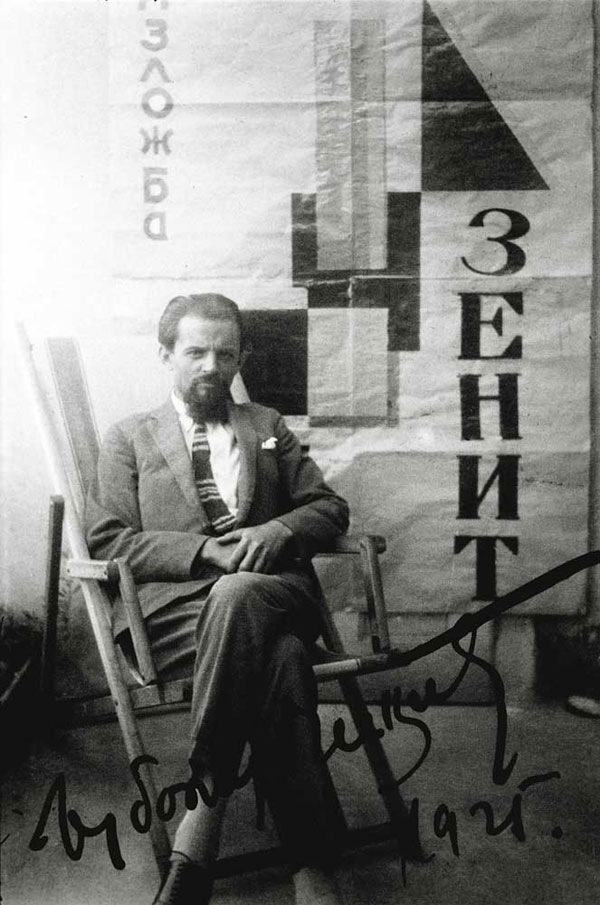
- Born: 16 November 1895; Jastrebarsko, Austria-Hungary (modern-day Croatia)
- Died: 14 June 1971 (aged 75); Pančevo, SFR Yugoslavia
- Education: University of Zagreb
- Occupations: Poet, writer, journalist, critic
- Writing career
- Language: Serbian
- Period: Avant Garde
- Notable work: Zenit
- Movement: Zenitism

Ljubomir Micić (Serbian Cyrillic: Љубомир Мицић; 15 November 1895 – 14 June 1971) was a Serbian poet, writer, critic, editor and actor. He was the founder of the avant-garde movement Zenitism and its magazine Zenit. Both he and his brother, Branko Ve Poljanski became prominent avant-garde artists.

== Biography ==
Micić was born in Jastrebarsko, the town south west from Zagreb, Kingdom of Croatia-Slavonia within Habsburg Monarchy. He studied philosophy at University of Zagreb, .

He founded the review Zenit, set up a Zenit Gallery and published his own writings and other authors under the Zenit imprint. Zenit was active from February 1921 until April 1924 in Zagreb, and afterward in Belgrade from 1924 until late 1926 with a total of 43 editions. The first artist to collaborate with Micić and to contribute to Zenit's orientation towards Expressionism was Vilko Gecan. Micić's Zenitism was supported by a small number of younger Yugoslav artists, namely Mihajlo Petrov, Vasa Pomorišac, Jovan Bijelić, Petar Dobrović, Ivan Radović.

Micić worked on collecting and exhibiting avant-garde art in Zenit editorial offices in Zagreb and Belgrade, and he organized Zenit international exhibitions of new art in Belgrade in 1924.

Micić initially followed expressionistic ideas, which can be seen in the introductory text of the first Zenit, and in texts of authors including Miloš Crnjanski, Stanislav Vinaver, Rastko Petrović and Dušan Matić. Besides Serbian authors, international writers contributed in more than five languages, including Esperanto. The magazine established ties with Futurists, including Filippo Tommaso Marinetti.

Joined by Ivan Galom and Boško Tokin, he published the "Manifesto of Zenitism" in which they stated their ideas and ideology. Beside clear contradictions in their statements, Zenitists placed humans in the center of their attention and advocated antitraditionalism, antimilitarism and reaching out to new media and art forms such as radio, film, and jazz.

After closing Zenit, he moved to Paris, where he lived from 1927-1936.

Inspired by the Russian avant-garde, Micić favored the Constructivist view on creativity, denying inspiration as a term in favor of work, with a clear goal in mind. Shortly after abandoning expressionistic ideas, Micić coined the idea of Barbarogenije, proposing Balkanisation and barbarisation of Europe. His ideas in favor of primitive and folk art came after World War I and general disappointment in the culture of Western Europe.

Micić considered the Balkans to be an unexplored area that could offer freshness and honesty. He was also highly critical of the total value of alleged "great" Croatian culture which he considered to be inferior compared next to Serbian culture.

== Legacy ==
His work was almost forgotten after World War II. After his death, a collection of art and documentation of his publishing activities were found in his apartment, thus stimulating fresh research into the history and aesthetics of Zenitism. Micić's possessions, including a number of paintings, collages, drawings, books, and magazines were given to the National Museum of Serbia in 1980 and today they are a part of the permanent exhibition.

== Works ==
- Ritmi mojih slutnja, 1919.
- Ritmi bez sjaja, 1919.
- Istočni greh, 1920.
- Misterij za bezbožne ljude čiste savesti, 1920.
- Spas duše, 1920.
- Stotinu vam bogova, 1922.
- Aeroplan bez motora, 1925.
- Antievropa, 1926.
- Hardi! A la Barbarie. Paroles zénitistes d'un barbare européen, 1928.
- Zéniton, L'Amant de Fata Morgana, 1930.
- Les Chevaliers de Montparnasse, 1932.
- Etre ou ne pas être i Après Saraïevo – Expédition punitive, 1933.
- Rien sans Amour, 1935.
- Barbarogénie le Décivilisateur, 1938.

== See also ==
- List of painters from Serbia
- Branko Ve Poljanski
- Yvan Goll
- Dragan Aleksić
- Zenit (magazine)

== Sources ==
- Irina Subotić, "Istorijske avangarde: dadaizam - zenitizam - nadrealizam", in Od Avangarde do Arkadije, Belgrade: Clio, 2000. {{{1}}}
- Part of the article adapted from - https://monoskop.org/Ljubomir_Micić
