= Zenitism =

Yugoslavian avant-garde art movement from 1921 to 1926

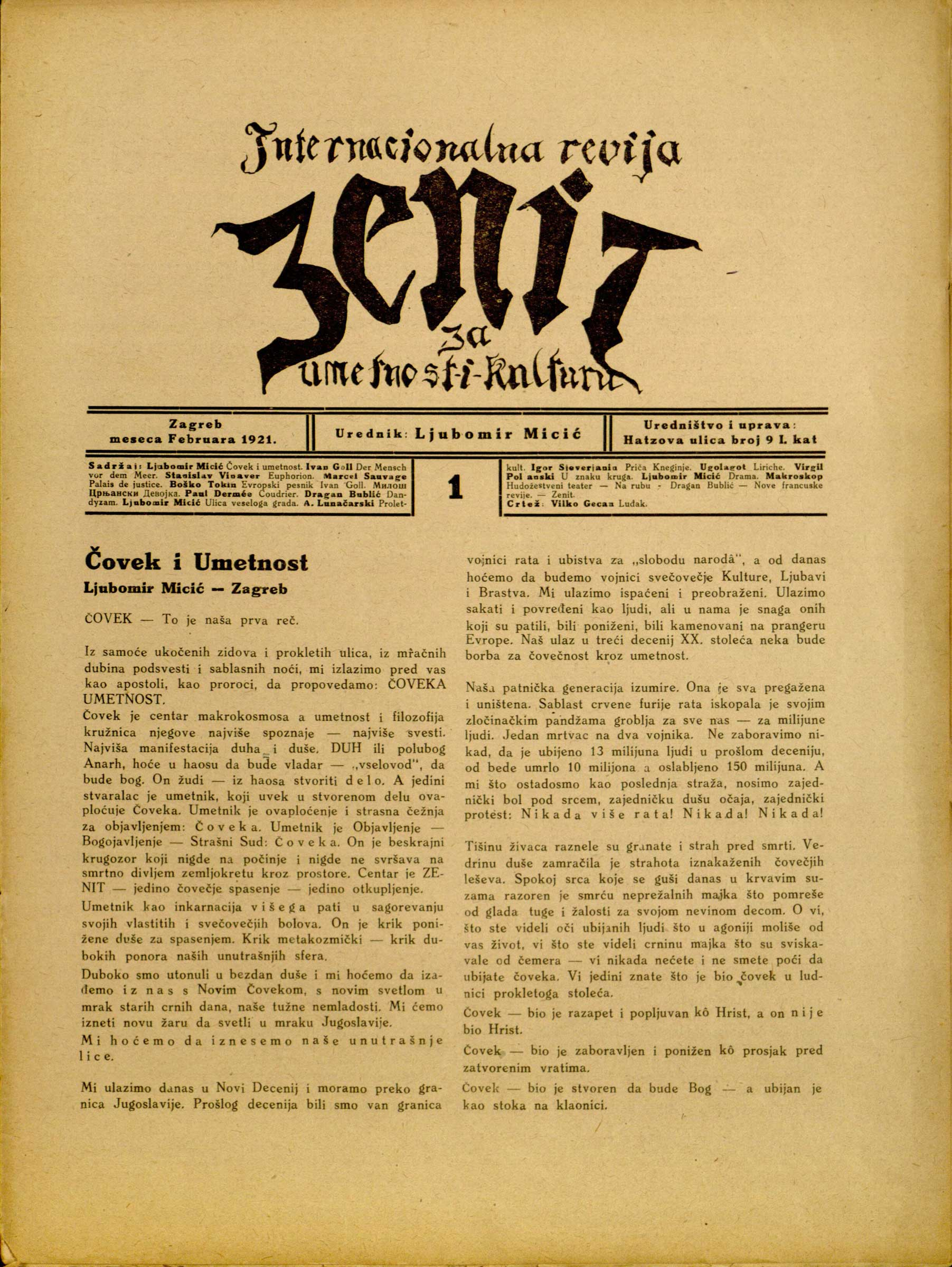
Zenit, a monthly periodical about Zenitism, ran from 1921 until it was forbidden in 1926

Zenitism (Serbo-Croatian: Zenitizam / Зенитизам) was an avant-garde art movement in Yugoslavia that lasted from 1921 until 1926, first appearing in Zagreb from 1921 to 1924 and from 1924 in Belgrade. It primarily involved visual arts, graphic design, poetry, literature, theatre, film, architecture and music. Like other avant-garde movements at the time, it held anti-war, anti-bourgeois and anti-nationalist views and rejected traditional culture and art. Micić defined it as "abstract metacosmic expressionism."

== The movement ==
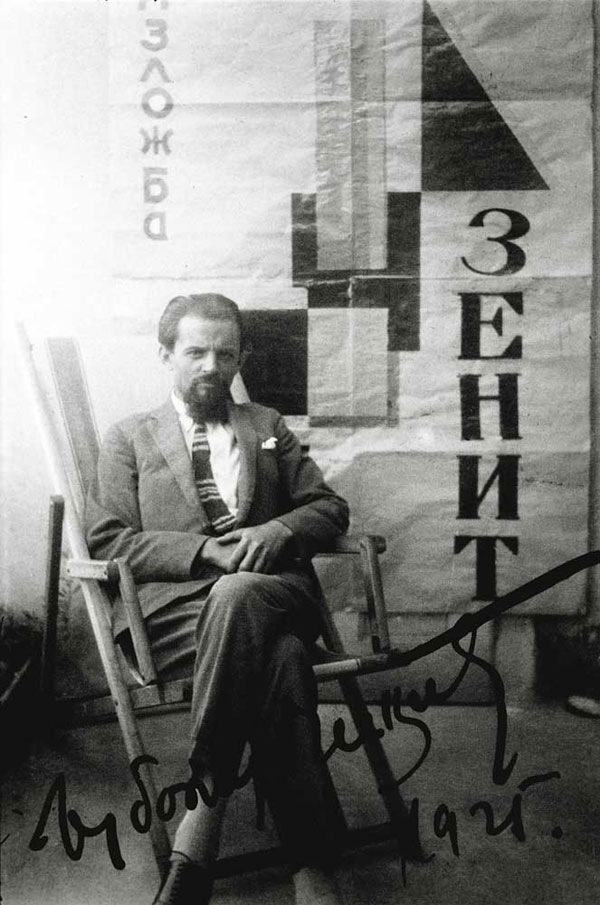
Ljubomir Micić was the founder of the movement. He was one of the leading avant-garde socialists in Europe after World War I.

Ljubomir Micić, a Serbian socialist, established the movement following World War I, during which Kingdom of Serbia lost a million inhabitants prior to creating Kingdom of Yugoslavia.

In June 1921, he proclaimed the "Zenitist manifesto". Although some artists from the region were known in Europe, Zenitism was the first notable art movement from the Balkans in Europe.

== Zenit magazine ==
Most of its artistic ideas were communicated through the Zenit magazine which Ljubomir Micić launched and which published 43 issues between 1921 and 1926. The magazine soon became famous internationally and saw many famous artists contributing the magazine. Most famous amongst them are Sergei Yesenin, Alexander Blok, Wassily Kandinsky, Miloš Babić Boris Pasternak and Miloš Crnjanski. The authors shared their radical views of the European civilisation and art. The movement would soon conflict and distance from Dada movement and Expressionism.

In 1925, the 36th issue of Zenit was banned by the Belgrade City administration for "inciting hatred towards the state", but the ban was overturned by the court. In 1926, the 43rd issue of Zenit was banned by the Belgrade City administration for "inciting citizens to disobey the authorities". This time, the ban was upheld by the City court and the Appellate court.

== Political views ==
The movement was avant-garde socialist, anti-traditionist, anti-militarist with the focus on humanity. Micić himself believed in the imminent collapse of western Europe and the rise of "barbarogenie" - barbaric Balkan man who will take its place.

Barbarogenie was capable of recovering Europe using his barbaric strength of a man from the Balkans, unsoiled by the legacy of European civilization which collapsed after WW1.

The concept is arguably expressing signs of nationalism. In reality Micić, an ethnic Serb, initially expressed anti-Serbian sentiment. In the eve of World War II, Micić changed his worldview, now expressing Serbian nationalism. He created the new magazine where he proclaimed the "Serbianhood manifest", promoting Serbian integralism and unitarism, and Serbia as the unifying center of all Serbs.
