= Mališa Glišić =

Serbian painter

Mališa Glišić (Bačevci, Kingdom of Serbia, 1886 - Nis, Kingdom of Serbia, 1915 or 1916) was a Serbian painter from the early 20th century and one of the forerunners of Serbian Impressionism with Nadežda Petrović, Kosta Miličević and others of his generation. He was educated in Belgrade and Munich, created works in Italy until the First Balkan War, when he returned to Serbia and joined the army. He died in either 1915 or 1916 under unexplained circumstances. There are very few written documents left about him, as well as few preserved pictures.

== Biography ==
He studied at the Serbian Drawing and Painting School in Belgrade (1903–1905), led by Rista Vukanović and later by his wife Beta Vukanović. In 1908 he enrolled in the private art school of Hugo von Habermann in Munich. He discontinued his studies in 1909 and from 1910 to 1912 resided in Italy where he painted a number of landscapes of monumental format inspired by the surroundings of Rome and Naples. He participated in prestigious art shows and exhibited independently. He was the set designer of the National Theater in Belgrade (1909). When the Balkan War began, Glišić left Italy and returned to Serbia, where he joined the Second Army of Stepa Stepanović, with whom he participated in the Balkan War Siege of Odrin which ended with the capture of Edirne. He served in the same army in World War I when he painted several precious landscapes and scenes from the trenches. He died under unexplained circumstances. According to one opinion, he died in early 1915 of freckled typhoid in Niš, which he contracted after defending Belgrade; according to another source, in November 1915 he fell ill after retiring from the army and died on 10 December 1916. about his death. He was ceremoniously buried by the Bulgarians.

He had two solo exhibitions, 1907 and 1913. At first, he exhibited several paintings in private studios, and at the 1913 exhibition at the Second Men's Gymnasium, he exhibited 40 paintings. His exhibitions were not recorded by critics. His most significant works are preserved and exhibited by the National Museum of Belgrade, the Museum of Contemporary Art, the Belgrade City Museum and the Pavle Beljanski Memorial Collection.

Glišić exhibited his artworks as a part of Kingdom of Serbia's pavilion at International Exhibition of Art of 1911.

== Painting ==
Glišić's painting consists of three periods: school period (1907–1910); Italian period (1911–1912); and war period (1912–1915).

== The school period ==
Initially, he opted for landscape, light palette, and impressionism. His first paintings have a mature look, he goes the shorter route and fast to the finish. In the painting Tašmajdan (1907) all the features of impressionism are present - illuminated palette, blue shadows, free movement in dense layers. Glišić shows a strong tendency to paint the atmosphere.

== Italian period ==
Judging by the dense and difficult move from Tašmajdan, Glišić painted in the Italian way even before visiting Italy. In less than two years of his residency, he created a mature painting, which was at the very top of Serbian impressionism. The light is separated by a paste invoice arranged to give the impression of overflow. The origin of the green and yellow light of the layered structure is found in his experiments inspired by the Italian masters and the secessionism of Segantini. Due to the dense invoice and the tactile value of his work to Lazar Trifunovic, he is a forerunner of informal and structural painting. He achieved spectral and analytical light scattering, similar to divisionism, with colour mixing not being performed optically, either on the palette, but directly on the canvas, during painting. Pictures from this period include "Road to Monte Circe" (1912), "Landscape from Italy" (1911), "Landscape from the Sea" (1911).

== Gallery ==
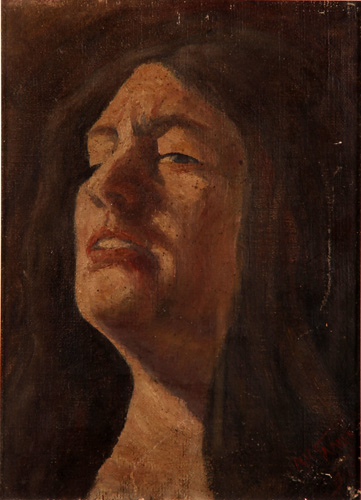
Woman's head, 1903.

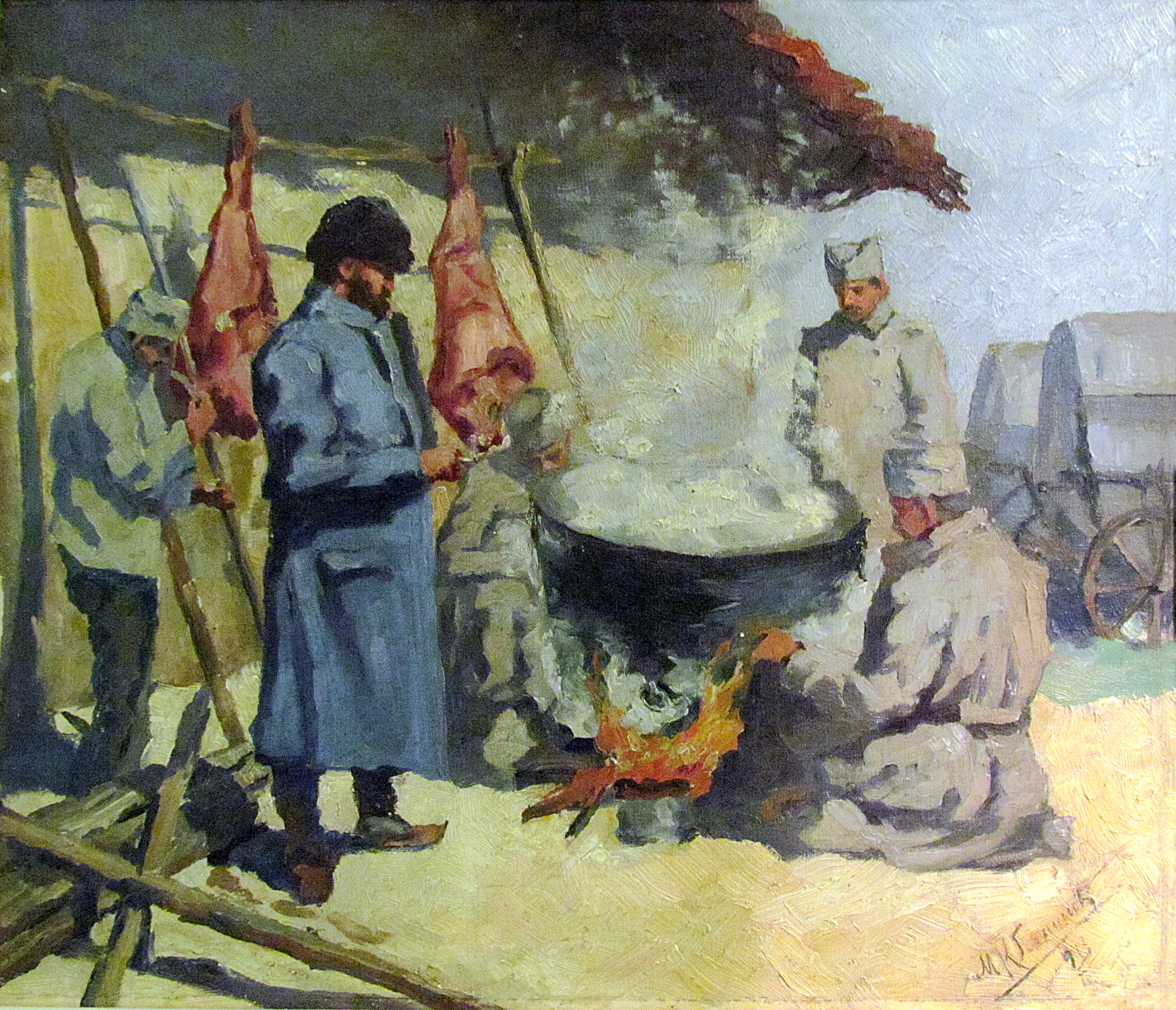
Soldier's mess, 1911.

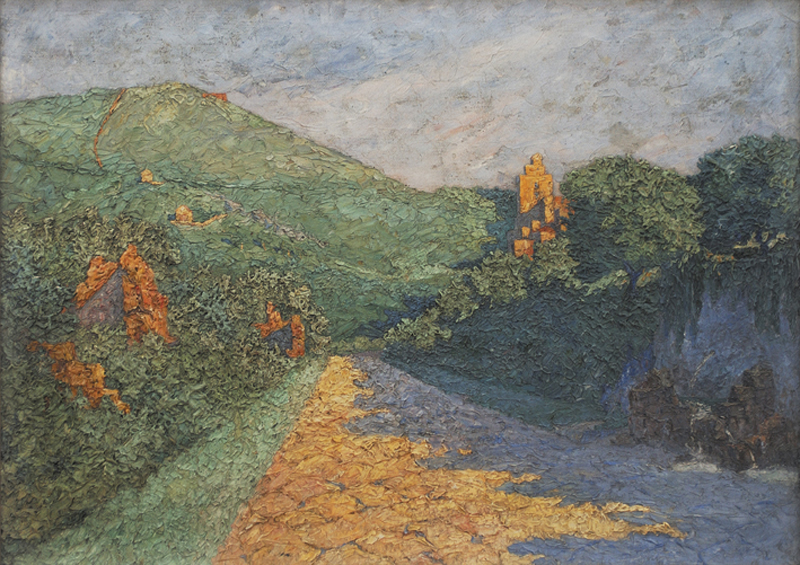
Outskirts of Rome.

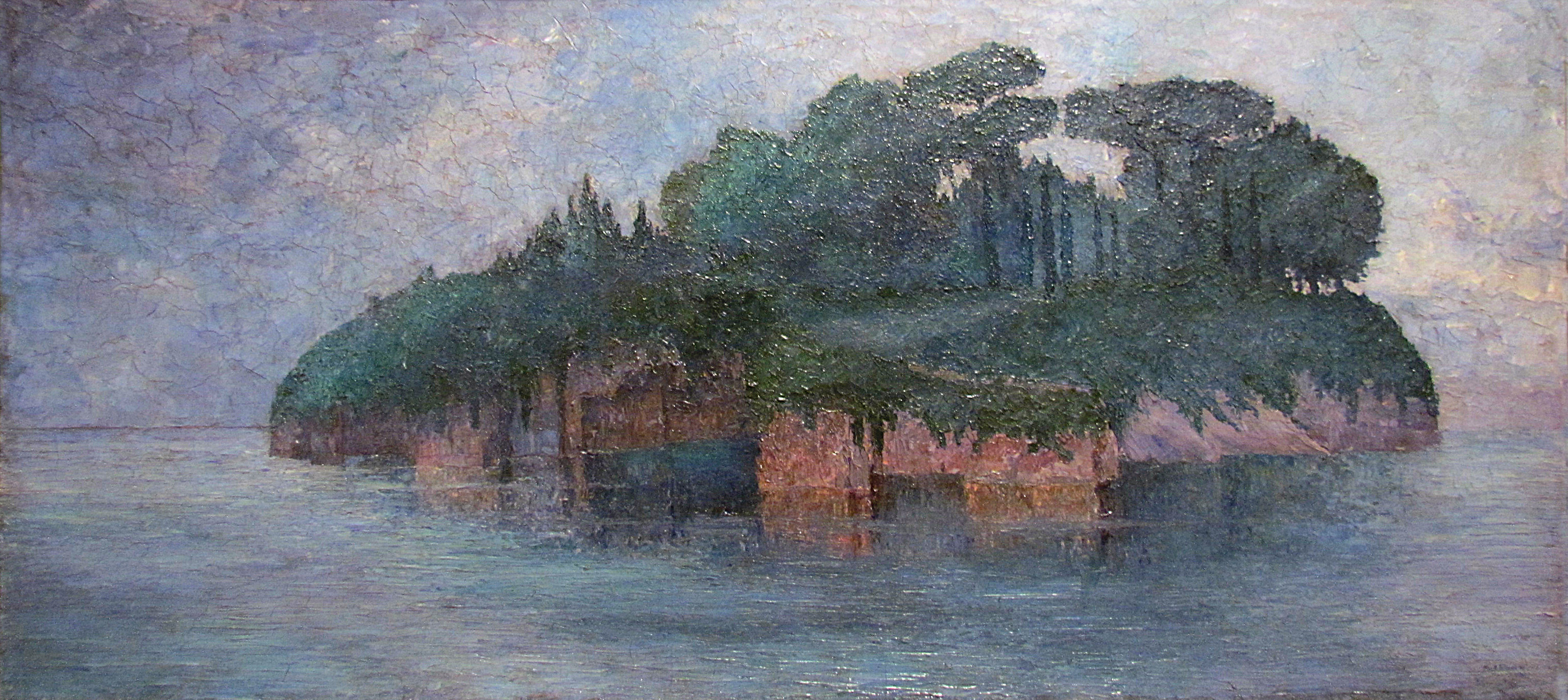
Paysage, 1911.

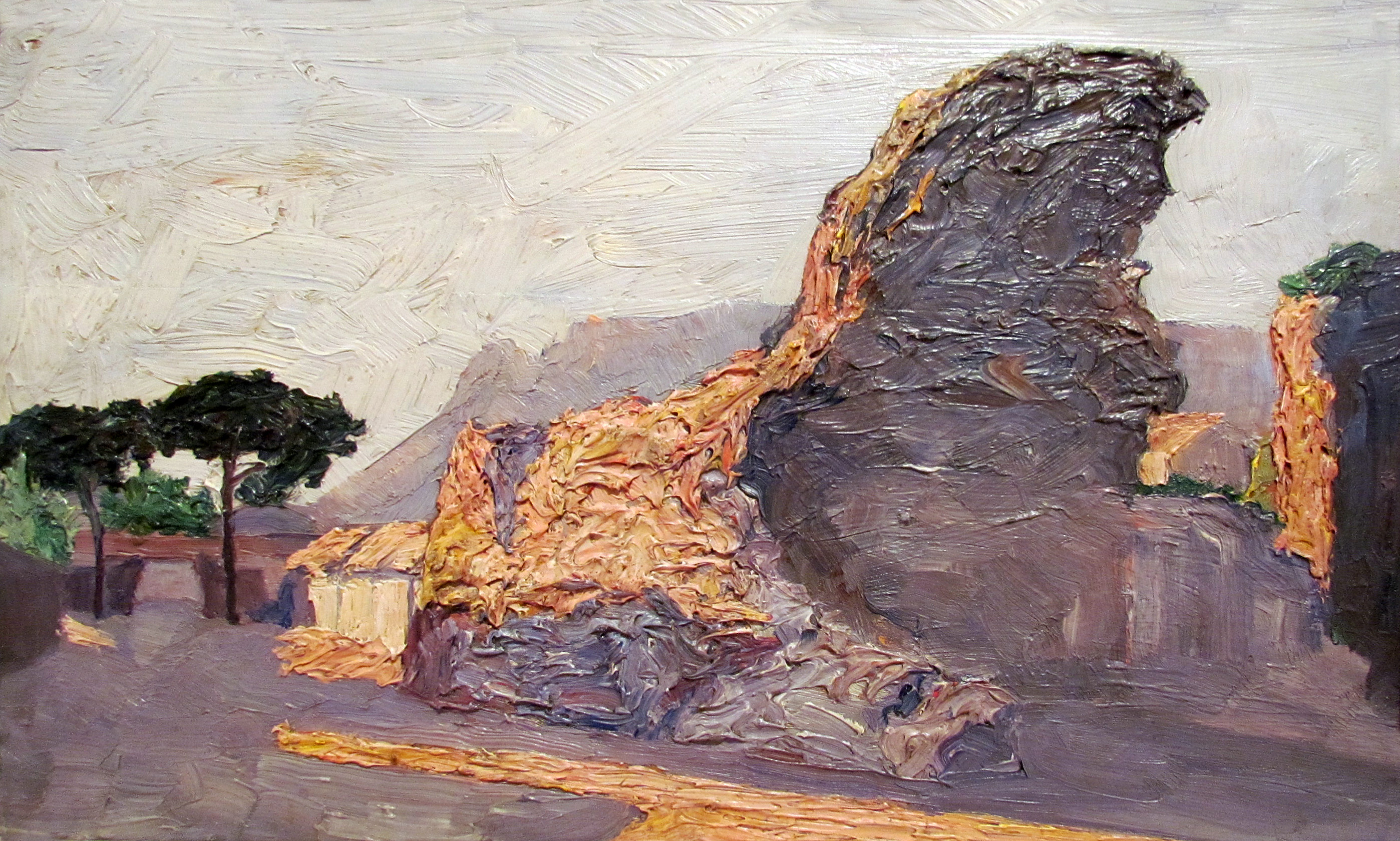
Моtiff of Rome, 1911.

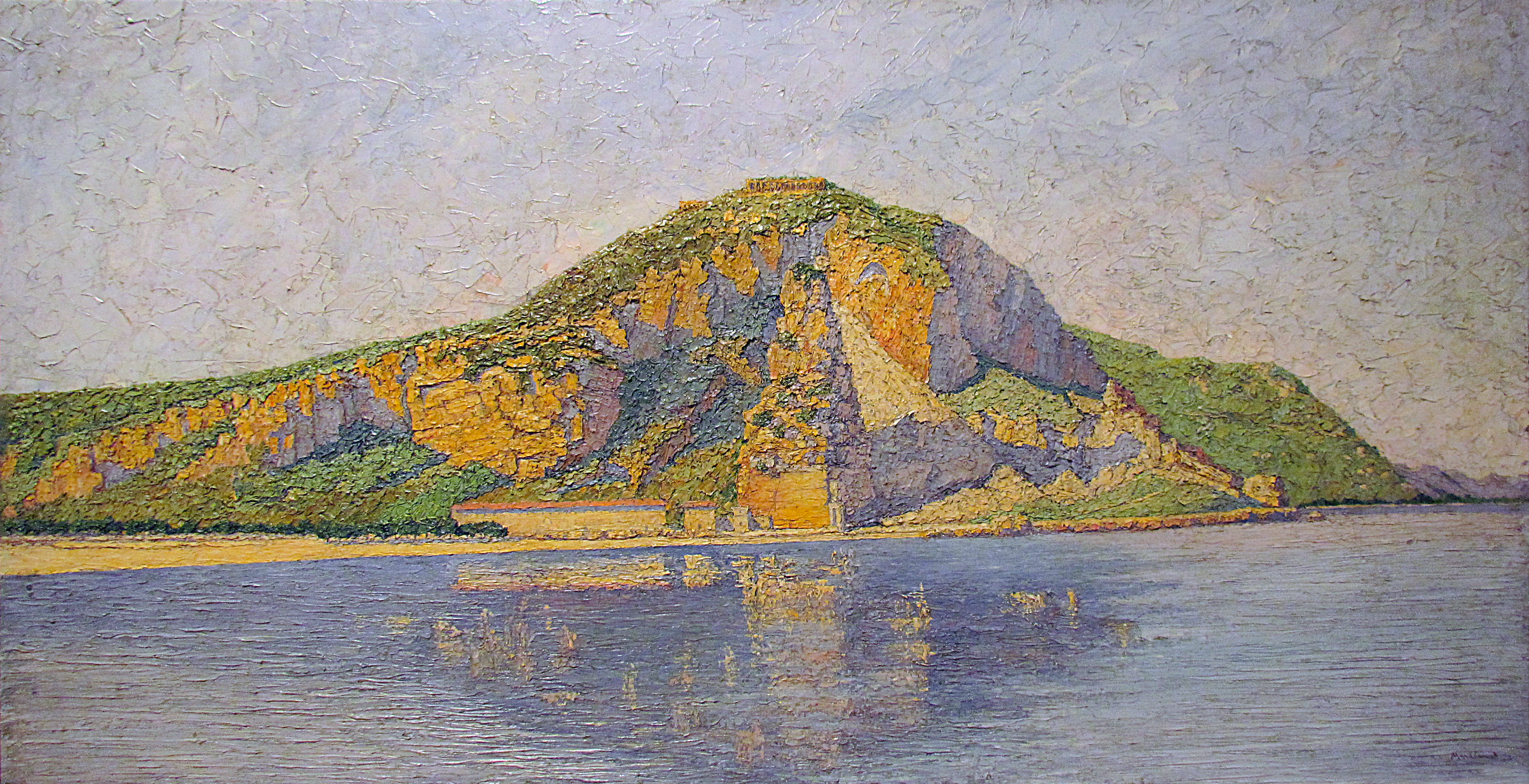
Теrracina, 1912.

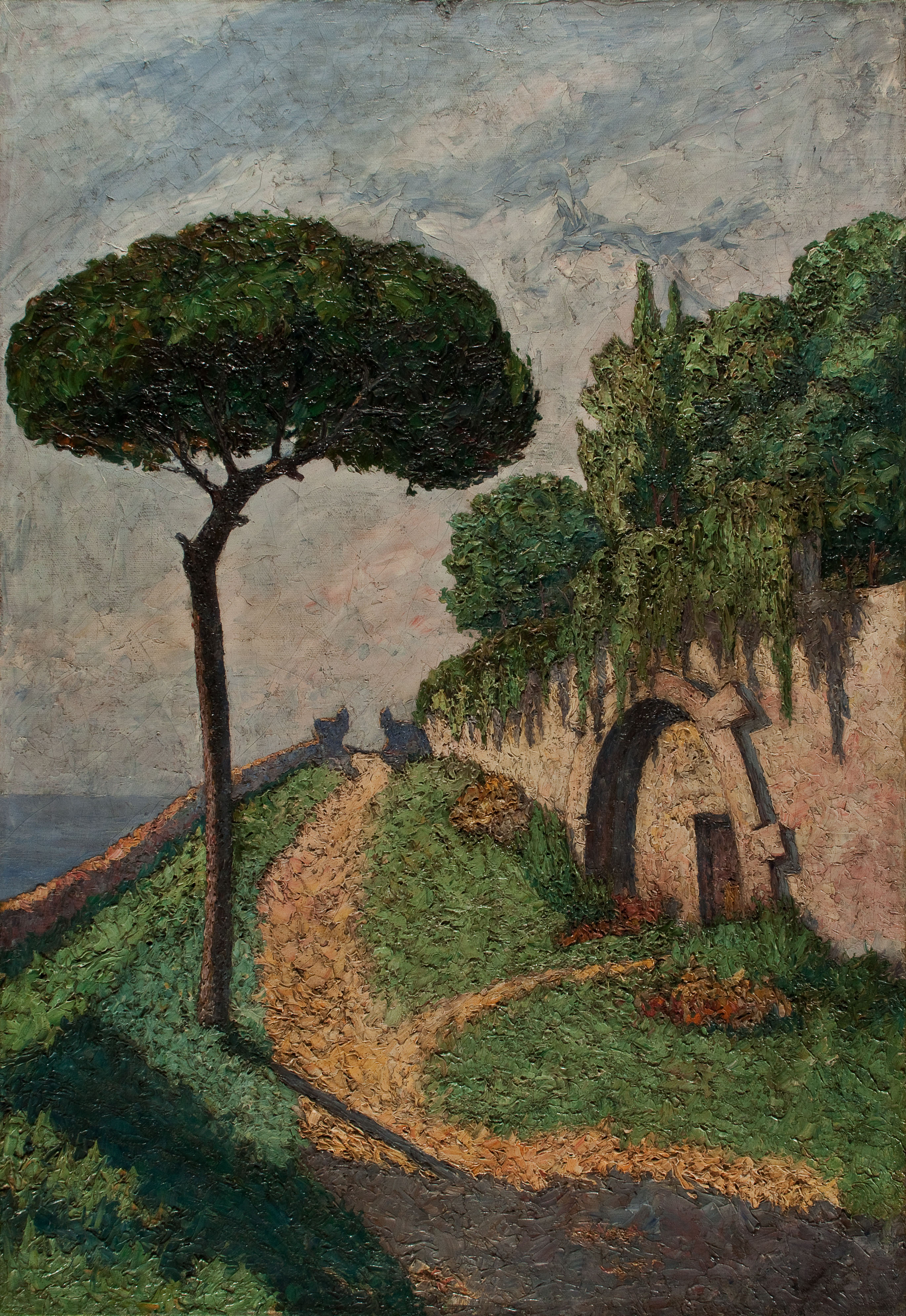
Road to Monte Curcio, 1913.

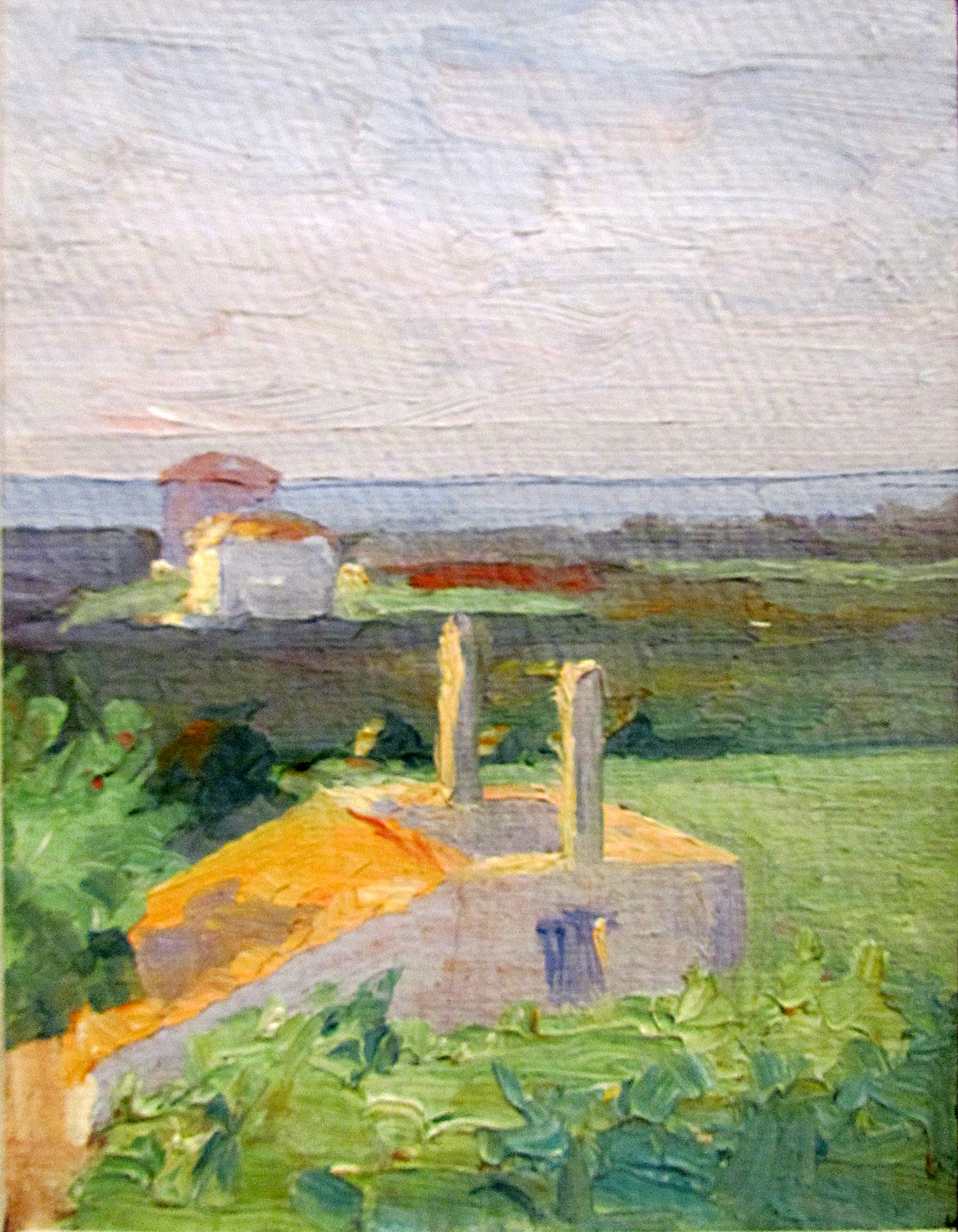
Мurat's Tomb, 1915.

== See also ==
- List of Serbian painters
