= Vidosava Kovačević =

Serbian painter (1889–1913)

Vidosava Kovačević (Belgrade, Kingdom of Serbia, 15 May 1889 – Belgrade, Kingdom of Serbia, 11 September 1913) was a painter, one of the first Serbian painters to be educated in Paris. She belonged to the circle of artists from the beginning of the 20th century, gathered around the School of Arts and Crafts and professors Rista and Beta Vukanović, as well as Marko Murat. She created in a short period, from 1905 to 1913, during which she crossed the path from realism to impressionism and eventually expressionism.

== Biography ==
Vidosava Kovačević was born in 1889 in Belgrade. Her parents were Serbian historian and politician Ljubomir Kovačević and his wife Draginja Draga. They had six children. Son Vladeta, who died in the Battle of Kumanovo in 1912, and five daughters, one of whom was Milica Rakić, the wife of the poet Milan Rakić, who was then consul in Priština. All their children were baptized by Stojan Novaković, the president of the Serbian Academy of Arts and Sciences and a well known Serbian intellectual.

She began her education in 1895 at the Varoš primary school and then finished with the Girls' School (1899—1905), where her drawing teacher was the painter Rista Vukanović. At his suggestion, in 1903 she attended drawing classes and began her art education in 1905 at the School of Arts and Crafts in Belgrade.

=== Art studies ===
Leading Serbian painters of that time, Marko Murat, Rista and Beta Vukanović, Dragutin Inkiostri Medenjak and Đorđe Jovanović, taught Vidosava at the School of Arts and Crafts. Kovačević completed a general course (1905–1906), a special painting course (1906–1909), a course for teachers of drawing and fine writing (1909–1910) and acquired the highest artistic education in then Serbia. She spent her summer holidays (1909–1911) with her sister Milica in Priština. In Belgrade, she painted in nature, sometimes with a group of artists gathered around Kosta Miličević, and most often with Ana Marinković, with whom she studied. In February 1912, she went to Paris to continue her education. For several months, she attended the Rossi private art school and the Académie Julian, and in September 1912, she applied to the School of Fine Arts. She was the eighth of 120 candidates at the entrance exam and the only one among the accepted candidates from the South Slavic area.

=== Death ===
In November 1912, Kovačević returned to Belgrade due to the death of her brother Vlade Kovačević. On the way, she fell ill with the flu, which she got in Gatoria on the French-Spanish border, where she spent the summer. She went to Nice to recover, but returned to Belgrade and died of galloping tuberculosis, soon after the same disease took her sister Jela.

== Painting work ==
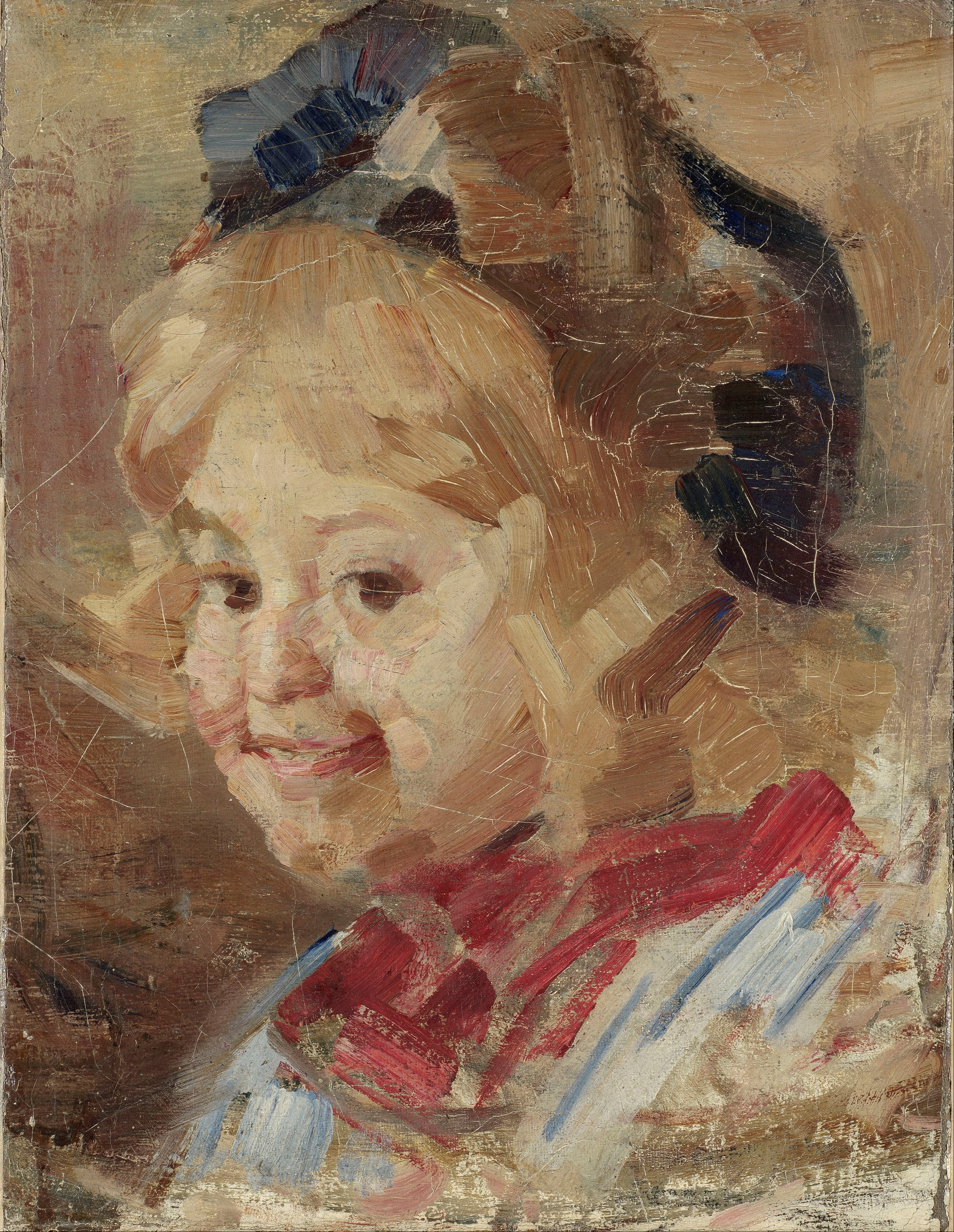
Head of a Girl (1912) by Vidosava Kovačević

Head of a Girl (oil on canvas, 1912) is the most famous work from the painting opus of Vidosava Kovačević. The Serbian art historian and critic Lazar Trifunović considers this painting by Vidosava Kovačević a masterpiece of her epoch.

She was one of the first Serbian painters to be educated in Paris. Her painting development ranged from school lessons in the style of academism, through Art Nouveau stylization, work in the open air, typical of the Impressionists, to the phase of expressive colour and strong stroke. She belonged to the first generation of Serbian artists who managed to completely overcome the conservative academicism of the 19th century and easily corresponds to the most modern tendencies of European culture. Trifunović said of Vidosava that she was "one of the most beautiful talents of Serbian modernism."

Her works can be found at the Pavle Beljanski Memorial Collection, Gallery of Matica Srpska, the National Museum of Serbia, and other museums and private collections.

=== First phase ===
Vidosava began her professional education in 1905 at the School of Arts and Crafts in Belgrade. This phase of schooling includes drawings, watercolours, oils on canvas and embroideries created in the period between 1905 and 1910. The works created during schooling recognize the school's curriculum and the great influence of professors – Munich students and the first Serbian modernists, Rista and Beta Vukanović and Marko Murat. These works testify to the maturing of drawing and the gradual transition from traditional visual language to more modern and freer solutions. Works from that period are characterized by confident drawing, studiousness, exceptional sense of composition and well-mastered anatomy. She also showed an exceptional sense of sculpture, but portrait painting remained the dominant genre for the rest of her life. She placed the characters on a dark background, dealing exclusively with realistic processing of the bright face. With a clear and detailed treatment of physiognomy, it remained part of the teachings of academism.

=== Second phase ===
The works painted in Belgrade, immediately after finishing school, and the ones she painted during her stay in Paris belong to the second phase of her work. During this period, which lasted only two years (1911–1912), she searched for personal artistic expression. Under the influence of Kosta Miličević, she released the move, added a richer colour and brightened the palette. She paid special attention to the psychology of personality, the characterology of movement, emotionality and mental state.

== See also ==
- List of Serbian painters
