= Serbian–Hungarian Baranya–Baja Republic =

Socialist state in Eastern Europe in 1921

Serbian–Hungarian Baranya–Baja Republic: Baranya-Bajai Szerb-Magyar Köztársaság (Hungarian); Српско-мађарска република Барања-Баја (Serbian); Srpsko-mađarska republika Baranja-Baja (Serbian)
- 1921
- Flag

- Border area between the Kingdoms of Hungary and the Serbs, Croats and Slovenes (later Yugoslavia). The territory claimed by the Baranya-Baja Republic is shown in orange.
- Status: Unrecognized state
- Capital: Pécs
- Government: Soviet republic
  - President: Petar Dobrović
- Historical era: Interwar period
  - Established: 14 August 1921
  - Disestablished: 20 August 1921
Preceded by	Succeeded by
Kingdom of Hungary (Regency)	Kingdom of Hungary (Regency)
- Today part of: Hungary

The Serbian–Hungarian Baranya–Baja Republic (Hungarian: Baranya-Bajai Szerb-Magyar Köztársaság, Serbian: Српско-мађарска република Барања-Баја / Srpsko-mađarska republika Baranja-Baja) was a small, short-lived and Soviet-oriented state, proclaimed in Pécs on 14 August 1921, on occupied Hungarian territory during the peacemaking aftermath of the first World War, tolerated and fostered by the newly proclaimed Kingdom of Serbs, Croats and Slovenes. Its territory included the geographical region of Baranya and the northern part of Bačka region, as well as a portion of the Banat.

== History ==
The republic was established on 14 August 1921 and was dissolved on 20 August 1921. The area of southern Hungary was occupied by the Kingdom of Serbs, Croats and Slovenes' army and was administered by the people's administration from Novi Sad. Following the defeat of Béla Kun's Hungarian Soviet Republic in the summer of 1919, many communist dissidents from Budapest, escaping from the "white terror" of Admiral Miklós Horthy, emigrated to Baranya, where Béla Linder, mayor of Pécs, gave them refuge. Linder, the military attaché of the Hungarian Soviet Republic based in Vienna in Austria, became the mayor of Pécs in September 1920.

In the Great People's Assembly of Pécs on 14 August, where in front of 15–20,000 people painter Petar Dobrović suggested the formation of independent republic that would include region of Baranya and northern part of Bačka around Baja. Petar Dobrović became president of executive committee of the new Republic.

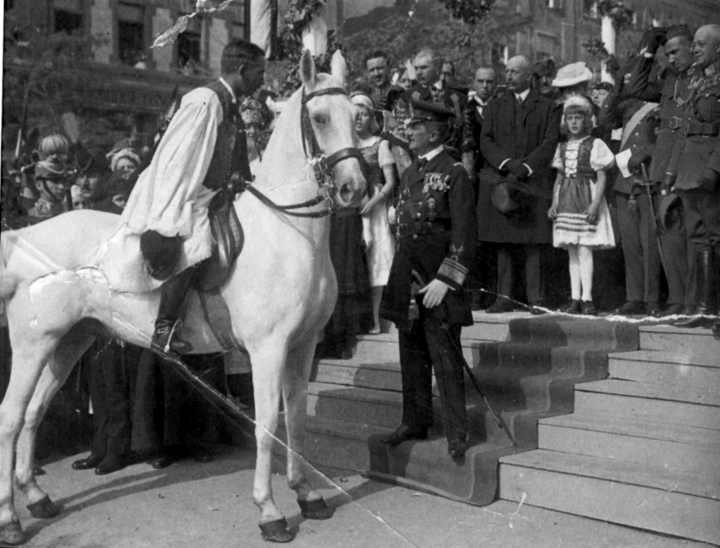
Horthy in Pécs, October 1921.

However, the authorities of the new republic did not manage to gain international recognition, and since the withdrawal of the Yugoslav kingdom's army, Horthy's forces entered into region and put an end to the Republic. From 21–25 August 1921, the region was reintegrated into Hungary, represented by Commissioner Károly Soós Bádoki, as had been allocated at the Treaty of Trianon of 1920.

== Population ==
Most of the inhabitants of the republic were ethnic Hungarians, while other ethnic groups that lived in the area included Croats, Serbs, Germans, Romanians, Slovaks and others.

- According to the Serbian census in 1919, the population of Pécs consisted of 14485 south Slavs, 17,901 Hungarians, 14549 Germans
- According to the Hungarian census in 1920, the population of Pécs consisted of 45 Serbs, 326 Croats, 40,655 Hungarians, 5034 Germans

This differences clearly demonstrate the Serb efforts of annexation, moreover, at the Serbian Census, they had to calculate the members of the Serbian Army into the census because there was a classified order about this.

== President ==
The President of the Executive Committee (14–20 August 1921), i.e. President of the Republic, was Petar Dobrović (1890–1942), an ethnic Serb.

== Sources and references ==
- Dimitrije Boarov, Politička istorija Vojvodine, Novi Sad, 2001.
- Leslie Charles Tihany, The Baranya dispute, 1918–1921: diplomacy in the vortex of ideologies, East European quarterly, distributed by Columbia University Press (Boulder [Colo.], New York), 1978.

== See also ==
- Baranya (former county)
- Baranya (county)
- Banat Republic
- Republic of Prekmurje
- Former countries in Europe after 1815
- List of historical unrecognized countries
