= Pavle Beljanski Memorial Collection =

Museum in Novi Sad, Serbia

The Pavle Beljanski Memorial Collection
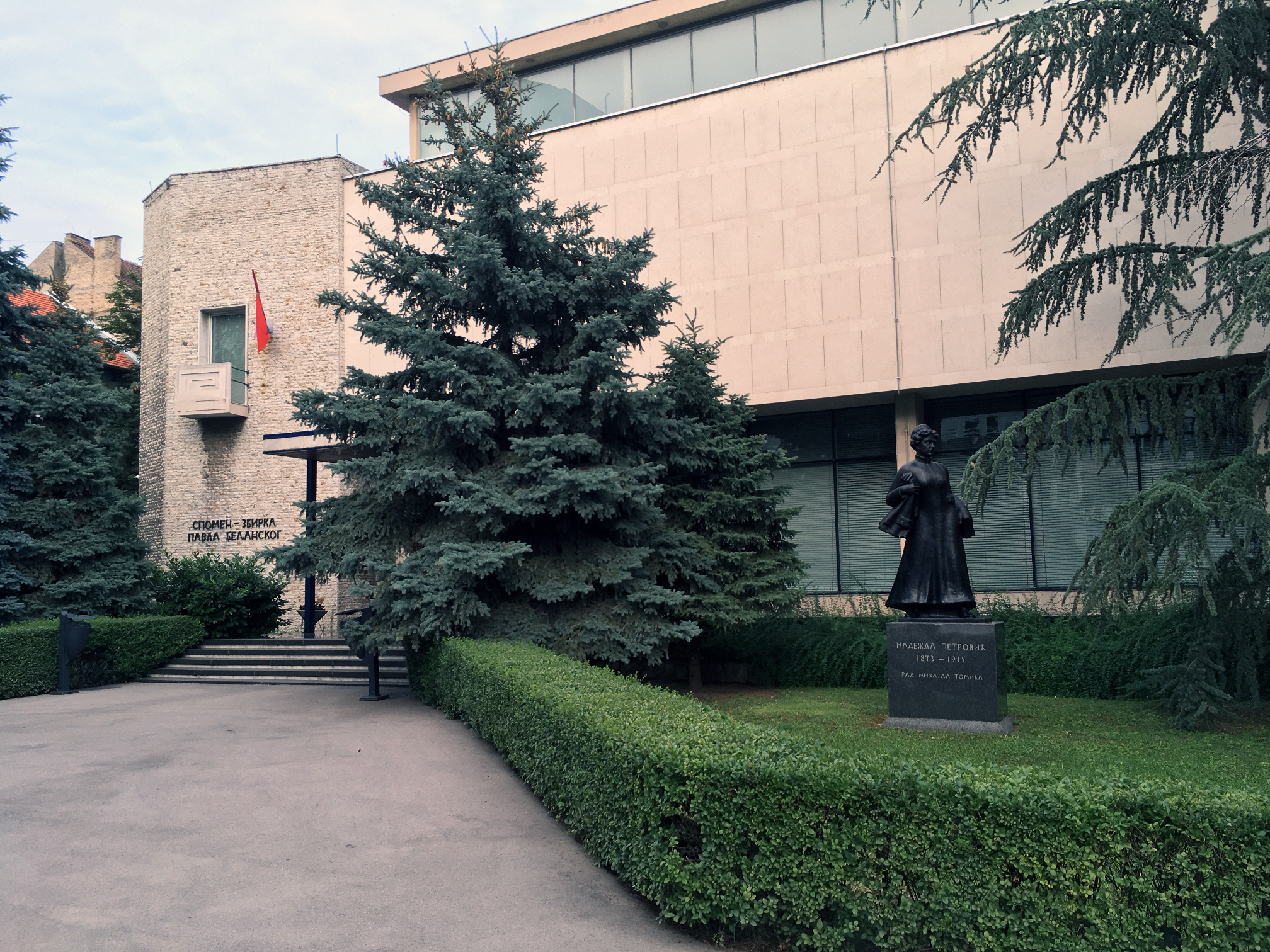
- Interactive fullscreen map
- Location: Novi Sad, Serbia
- Coordinates: 45°15′10″N 19°50′46″E
- Website: beljanskimuseum.rs

The Pavle Beljanski Memorial Collection (Serbian: Спомен-збирка Павла Бељанског, Spomen-zbirka Pavla Beljanskog) is a public art museum in Novi Sad, Serbia. It displays paintings and sculptures by 20th century Serbian and Yugoslav artists, mostly from the interwar period. The collection bears the name of its founder and contributor Pavle Beljanski, Serbian diplomat and art collector, who donated his collection of paintings, sculptures and tapestries to the Serbian people in November 1957. He continued to add works of art to this significant collection until his death. The collection consists of 185 works by 37 artists. The Pavle Beljanski Memorial Collection was opened to the public on 22 October 1961.

== History ==
After the end of the World War II, Pavle Beljanski decided to donate his art collection to the people of Serbia. He did this is 1957, when he signed donation agreement with the Government of Vojvodina.

The Memorial Collection is housed in building specifically designed by architect Ivo Kurtović for the purpose of housing the art collection. The building was built in 1961 and on 22 October that year it opened to public under the name of The Pavle Beljanski Memorial Collection. The great architectural value of the structure was achieved through the architect's precise evaluation of its specific requirements and the subsequent incorporation of these requirements into a functional whole.

== Permanent exhibition ==
When Beljanski started collecting works of art, most of the artists whose works he collected were anonymous young people at the beginning of their careers. This underlined the importance of the willingness and ability of Pavle Beljanski to recognize quality and purchase works of art which would, in years to come, gain the most important place in studies of Serbian art of the first half of the 20th century.

Pavle Beljanski's Memorial Hall opened in 1966 as a gift from Pavle Beljanski's heirs. It represents a reconstruction of his living and working space, with furniture, paintings, books, photographs, documents and many personal objects. It consists of portraits and self-portraits, as well as documented material about artists whose works are included in the collection (photographs, letters, personal documents and objects used by artists in the process of making art - brushes, paints, palettes). In his wish to help stimulate research on national art history, on May 27, 1965, Pavle Beljanski donated painting La Grande Iza by Vlaho Bukovac to the Memorial Collection, by the special contract of gift and on one condition – the Collection was to establish The Pavle Beljanski Award for the best final student essay in this field, presented at the Art history department of the Belgrade University. The award was founded in 1967 and it is presented annually every October. In the year 2000, the Memorial Collection began presenting every awarded work with its own theme exhibition.

=== Art collection ===
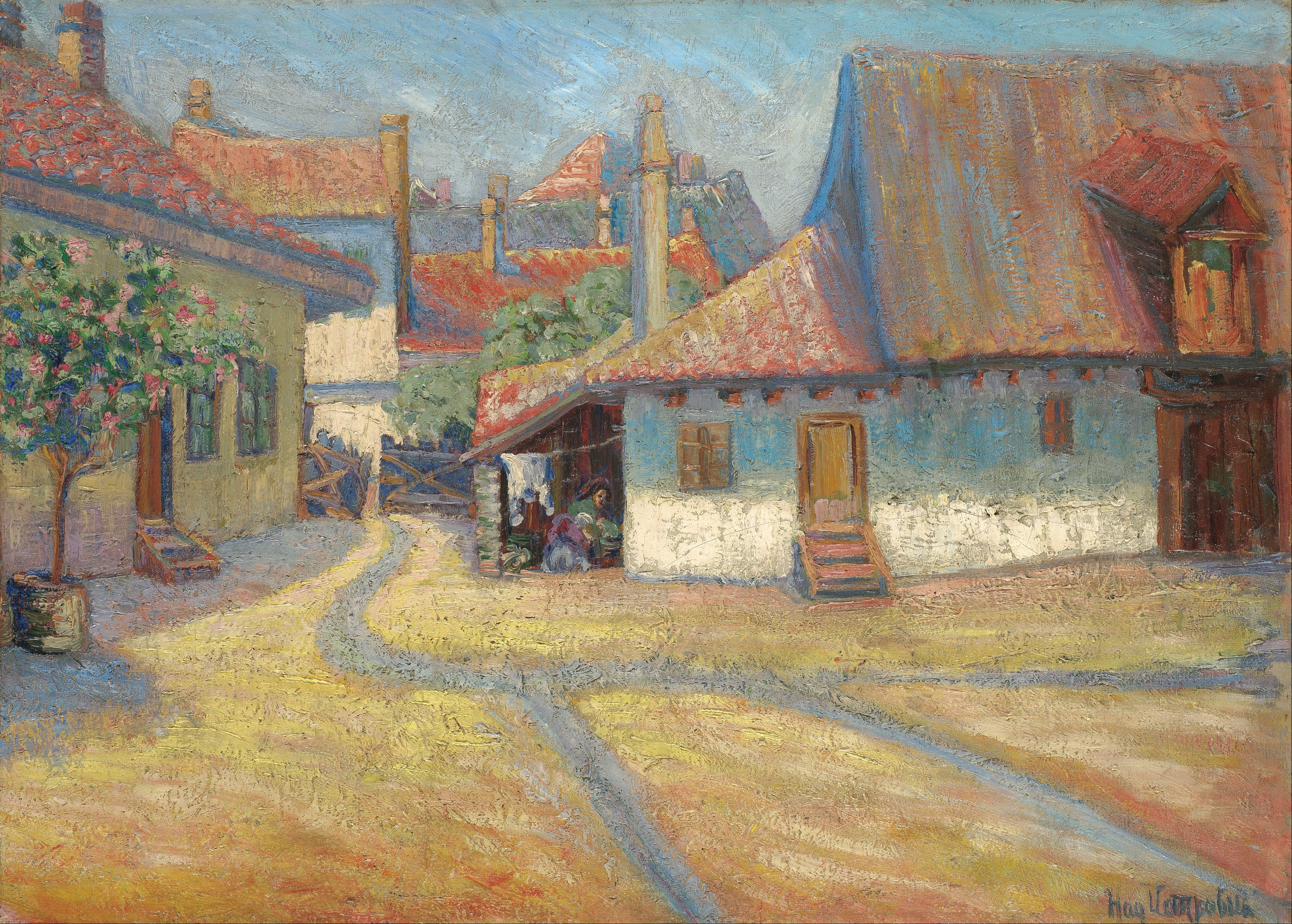
Nadežda Petrović - Belgrade Suburb (1908)

This Memorial Collection consists mainly of the first-class works of Serbian art from the period between the first and the seventh decades of the 20th century, with an emphasis on the period between World War I and World War II. Therefore, the collection chronologically begins with the paintings of the first generation of Modernists (Nadežda Petrović, Milan Milovanović, Kosta Miličević), and continues with the works of the most esteemed representatives of Serbian art between the two World Wars (Sava Šumanović, Milan Konjović, Petar Dobrović, Ivan Radović, Jovan Bijelić, Petar Lubarda, Sreten Stojanović, Risto Stijović), and artists from the second half of 20th Century (Zora Petrović, Liza Križanić, Živko Stojsavljević, Milenko Šerban, Ljubica Sokić). The Memorial Collection is also equipped with a library and a large archive, containing various items such as sketches, paintings, sculptures, letters, documents, photographs and video tapes.

== Other exhibitions ==
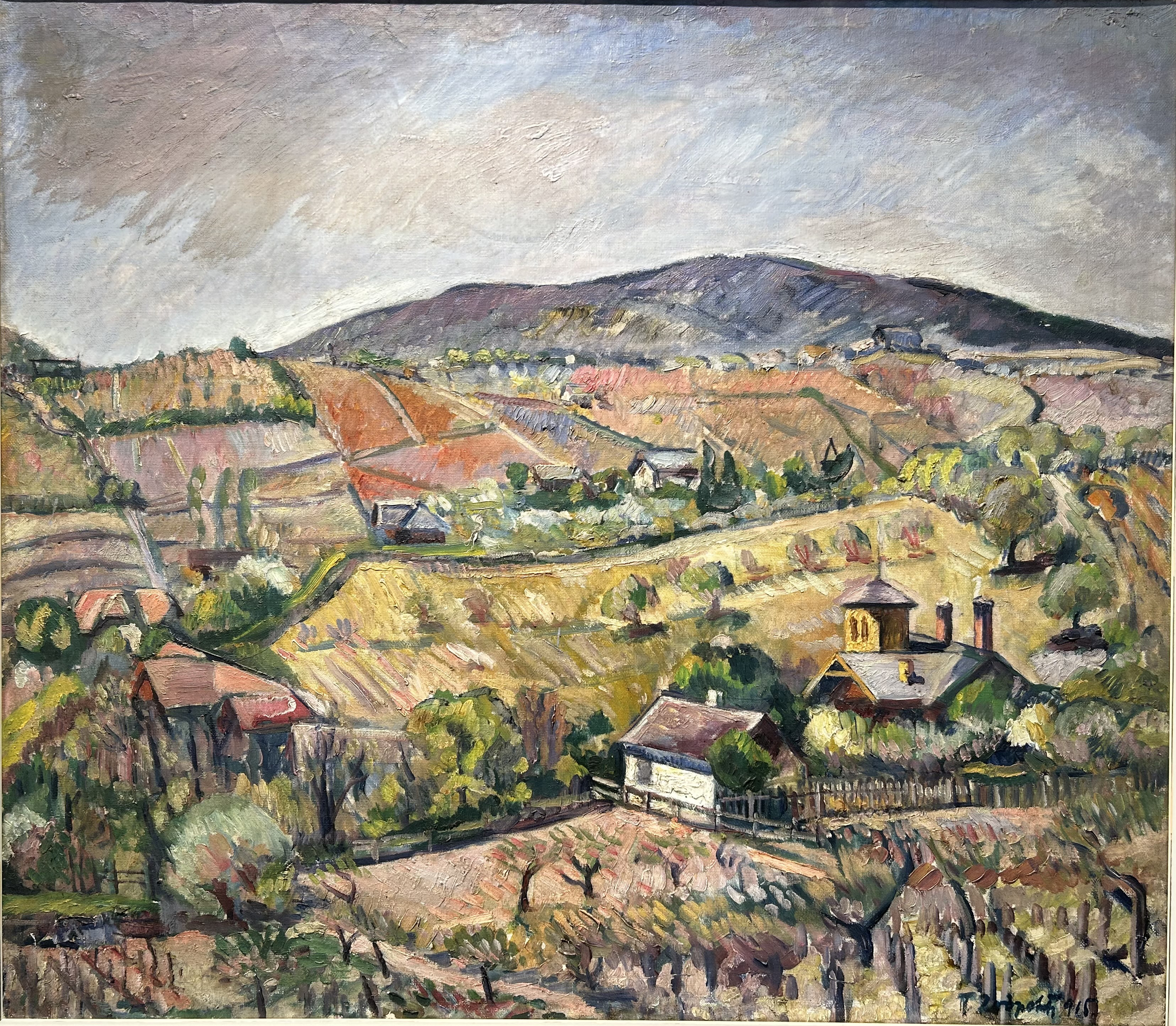
Petar Dobrović - Vineyards in Baranja (1915)

There are also theme exhibitions of artists represented in the collection, as well as phenomena in Serbian art of the early 20th Century. Apart from works of art, such exhibitions contain archival material such as drawings, photographs, catalogs, various documents and artists’ personal objects.

Every autumn, there is a three-month-long course for pre-school and grammar school students who want to find out more about the works of art and artists represented in The Memorial Collection, as well as about visual arts in general and about new trends and art techniques. After lectures in the form of conversations, students can choose one of the art techniques (drawing, graphic, painting, sculpting, mosaic) in which they will express their own impressions on works from the collection. The main goal of art workshops is to develop an artistic style as the basis for forming the future visual expression of every student. Every year, the Art workshop hosts about 50 students, ages 5 to 14, who create their own works of art through teamwork. Every year in December, there is an exhibition of children's work.

Concerts of classical music are often held in the Gallery's acoustic hall, as well as various book promotions, press conferences, and other events.

In cooperation with the Novi Sad Art Academy, several classes in Artistic Elements are held in the Memorial Collection. Through observing exhibited works, students study the relations between artistic elements, and by combining them, they create new works of art. Creative work is also attained through new technologies – digital printing, video presentations, installations, computer animation – which can help us study artistic phenomena of the 20th century. Lectures held at the Memorial Collection have a goal to encourage the exchange of ideas and experience in different art techniques. An exhibition of graduate students’ works has been held every year in May since 2001.

== Gallery ==
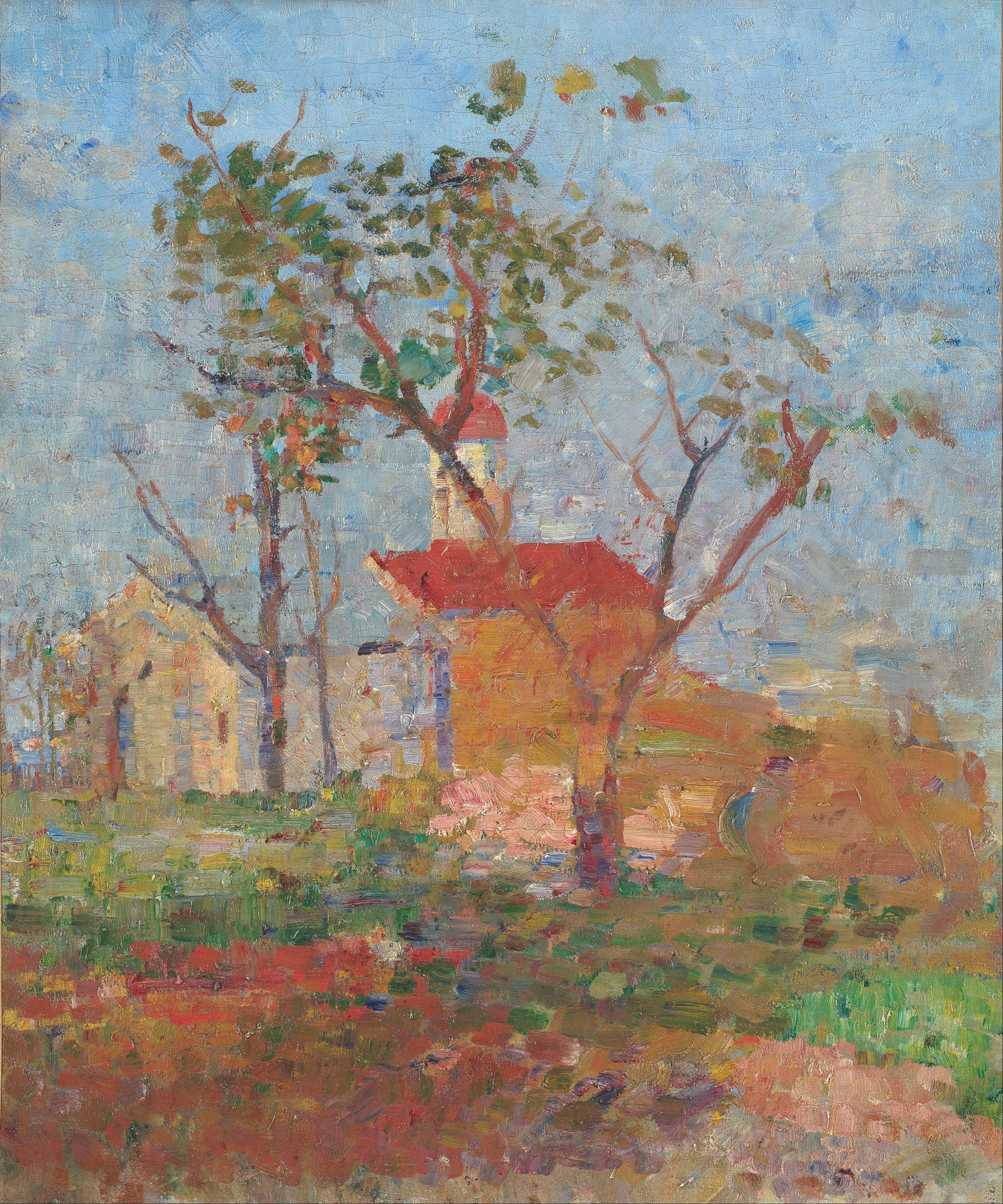
Kosta Miličević - The Church of St. Sava

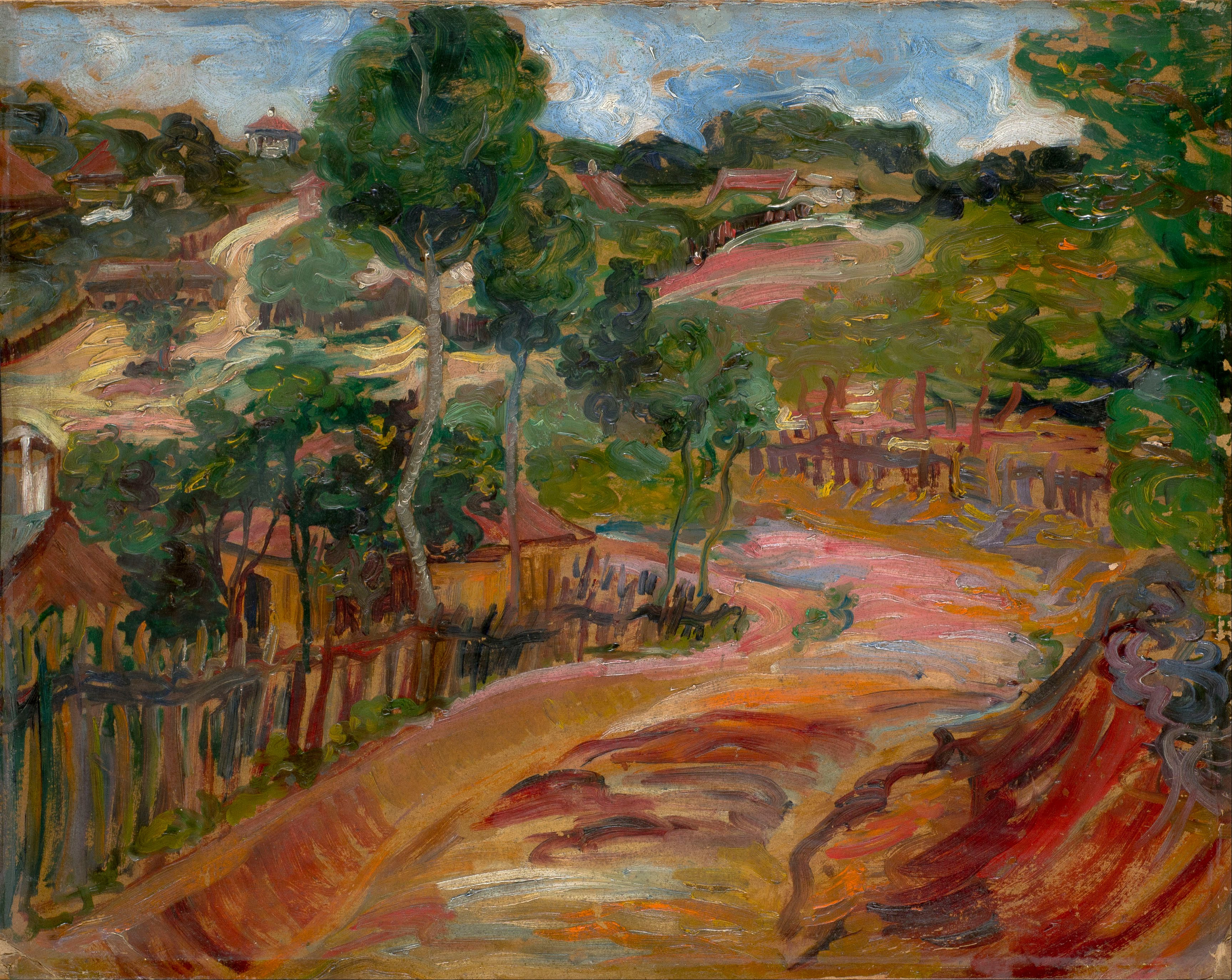
Nadežda Petrović - Resnik

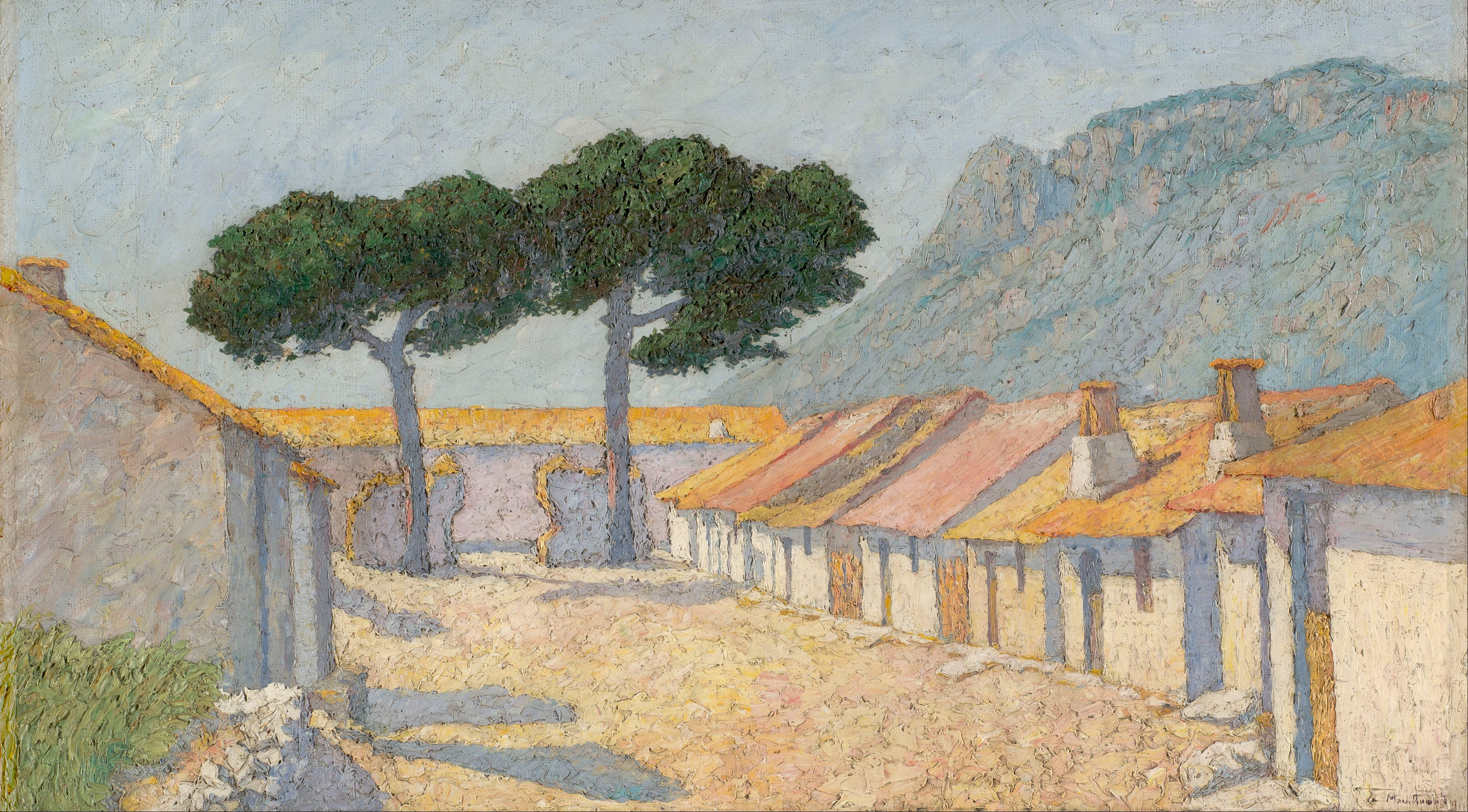
Mališa Glišić - Pine Trees

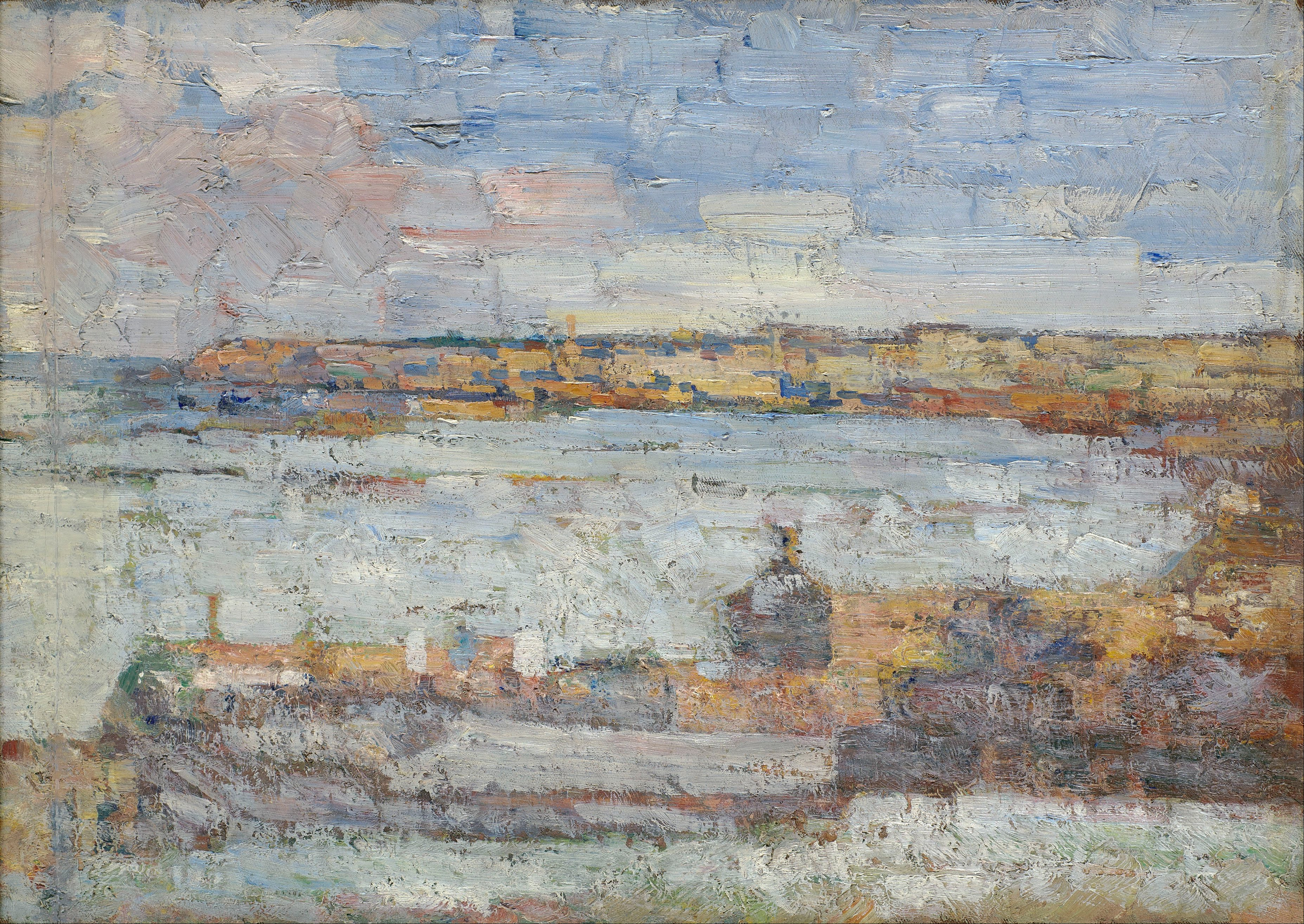
Kosta Miličević - View of Belgrade

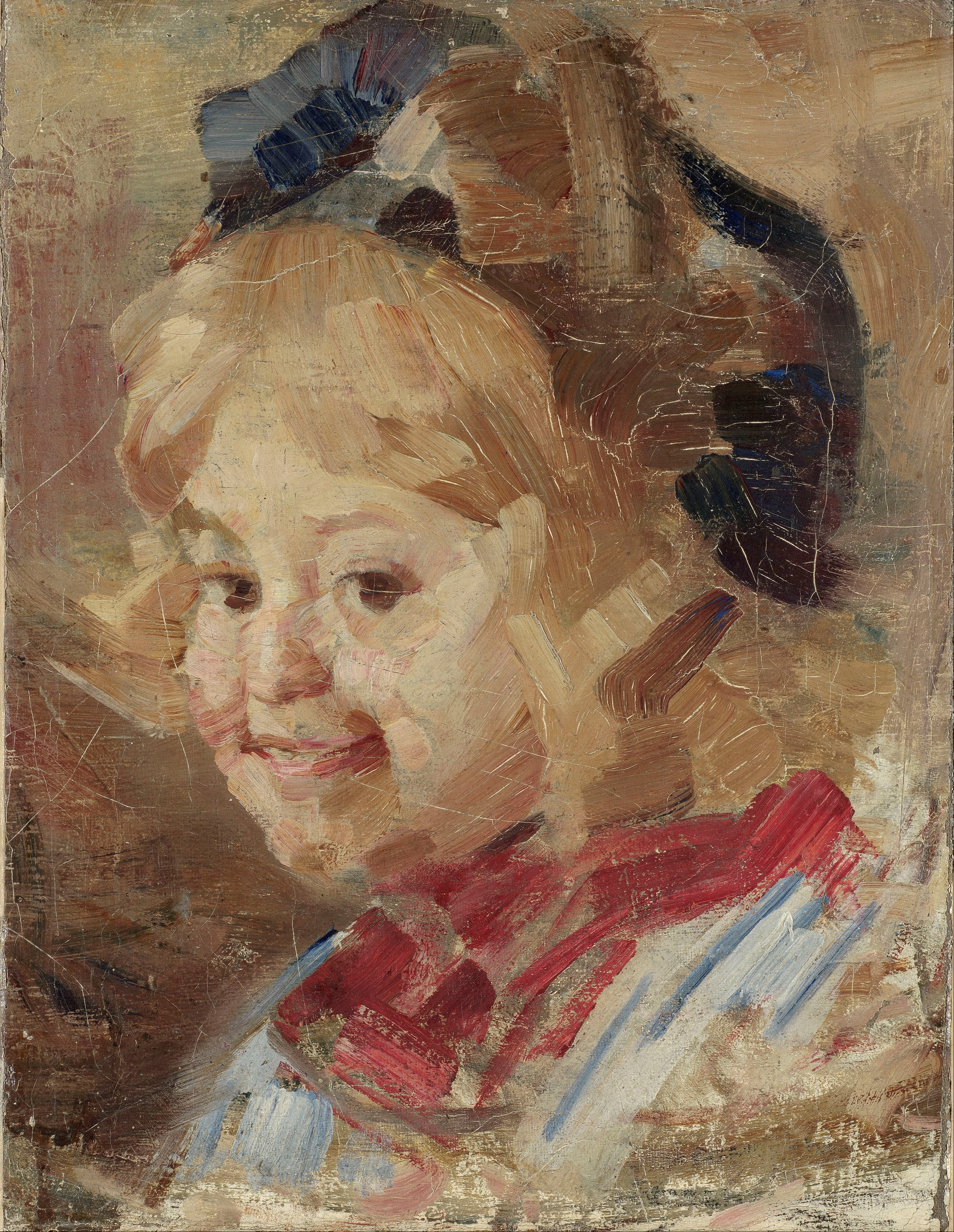
Vidosava Kovačević - Head of a Girl

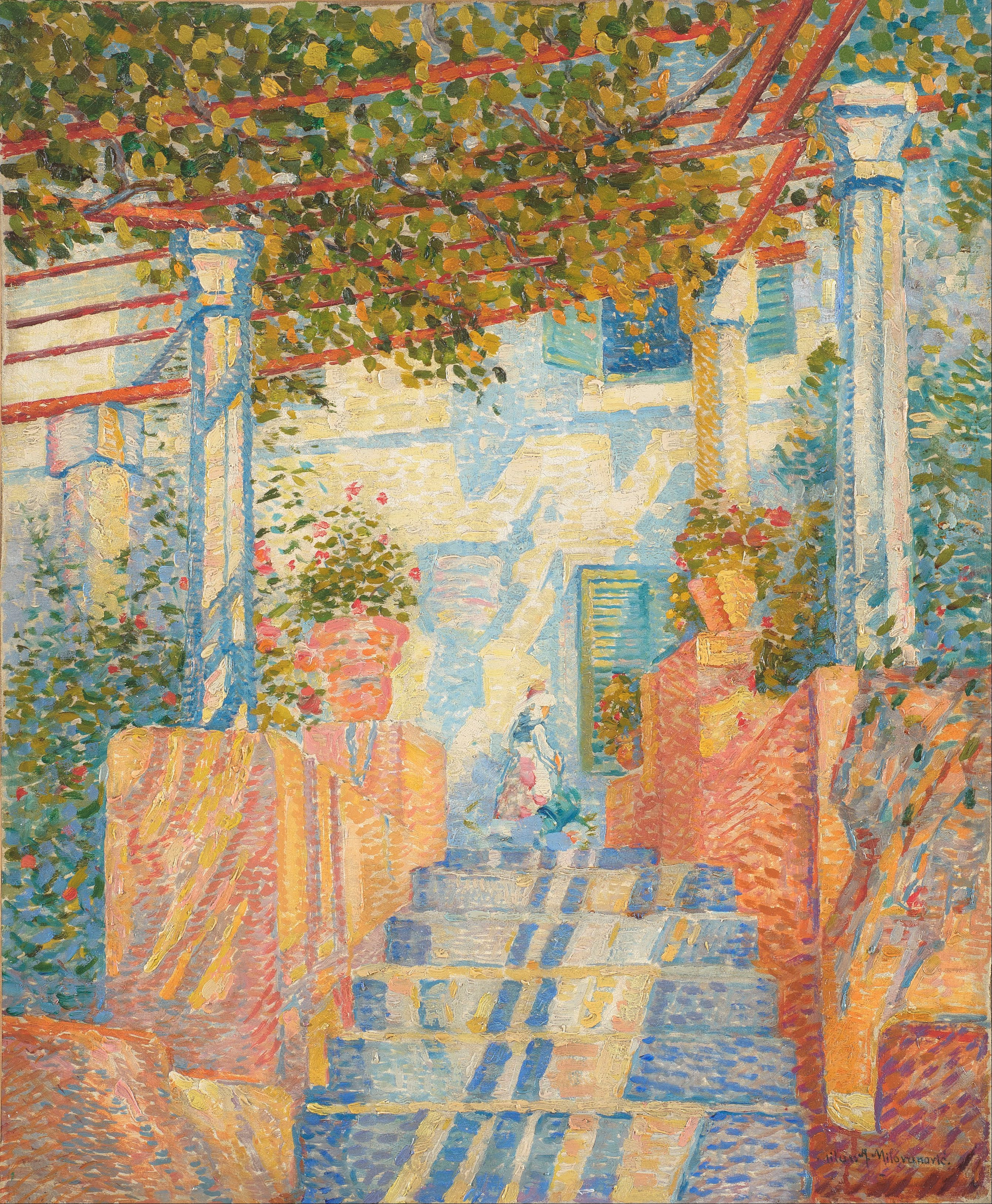
Milan Milovanović - Red Terrace

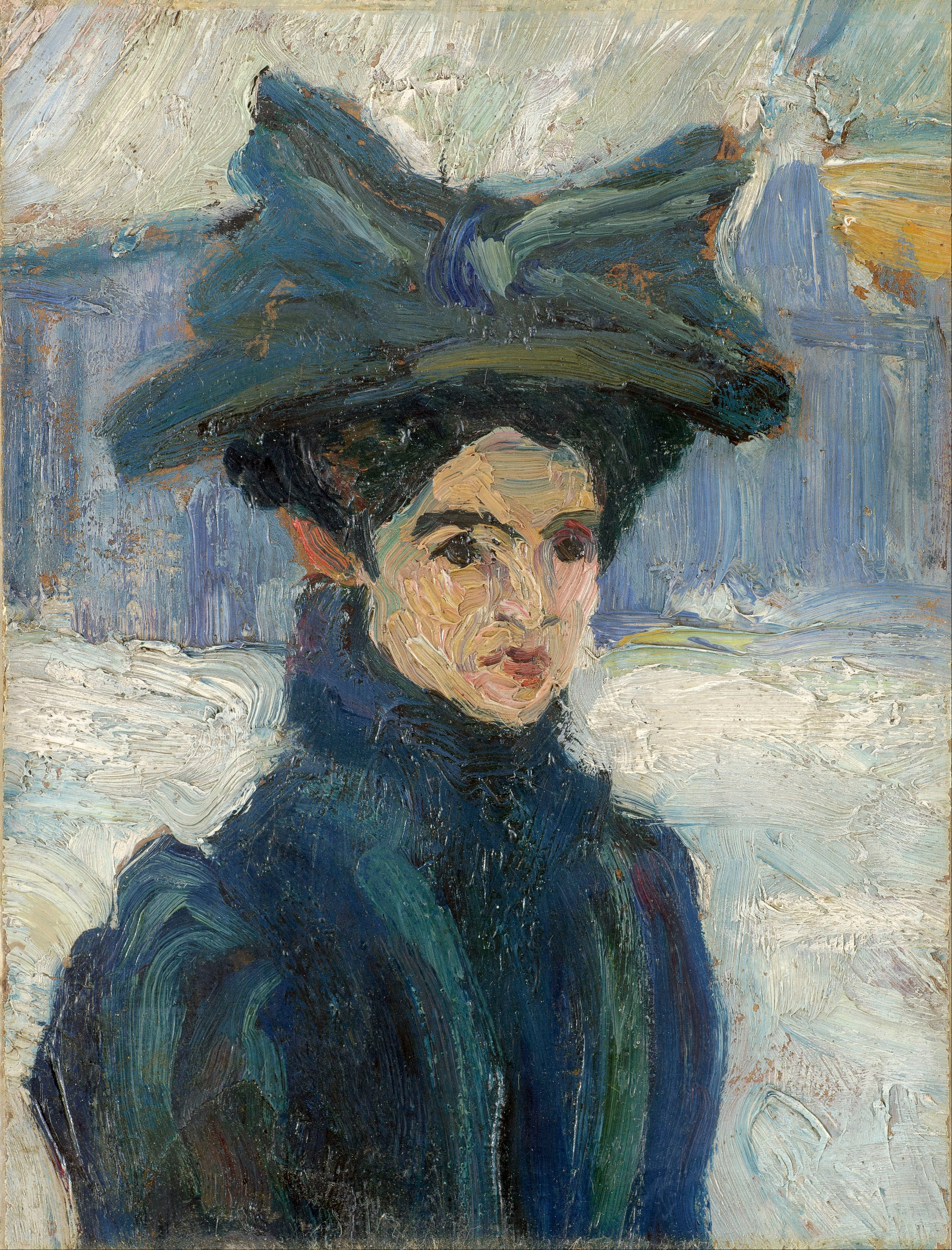
Nadežda Petrović - Ksenija Atanasijević

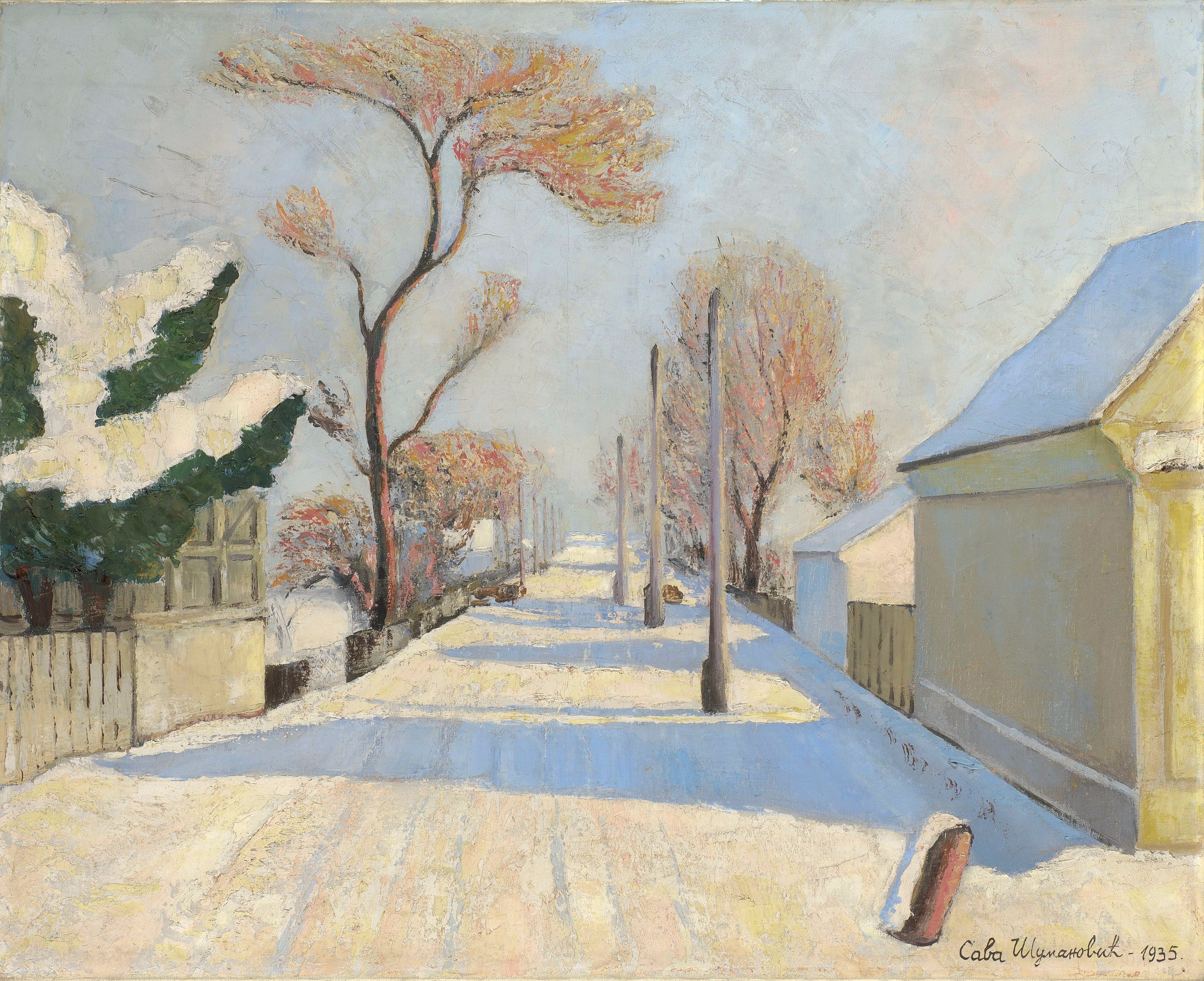
Sava Šumanović - Šid under Snow

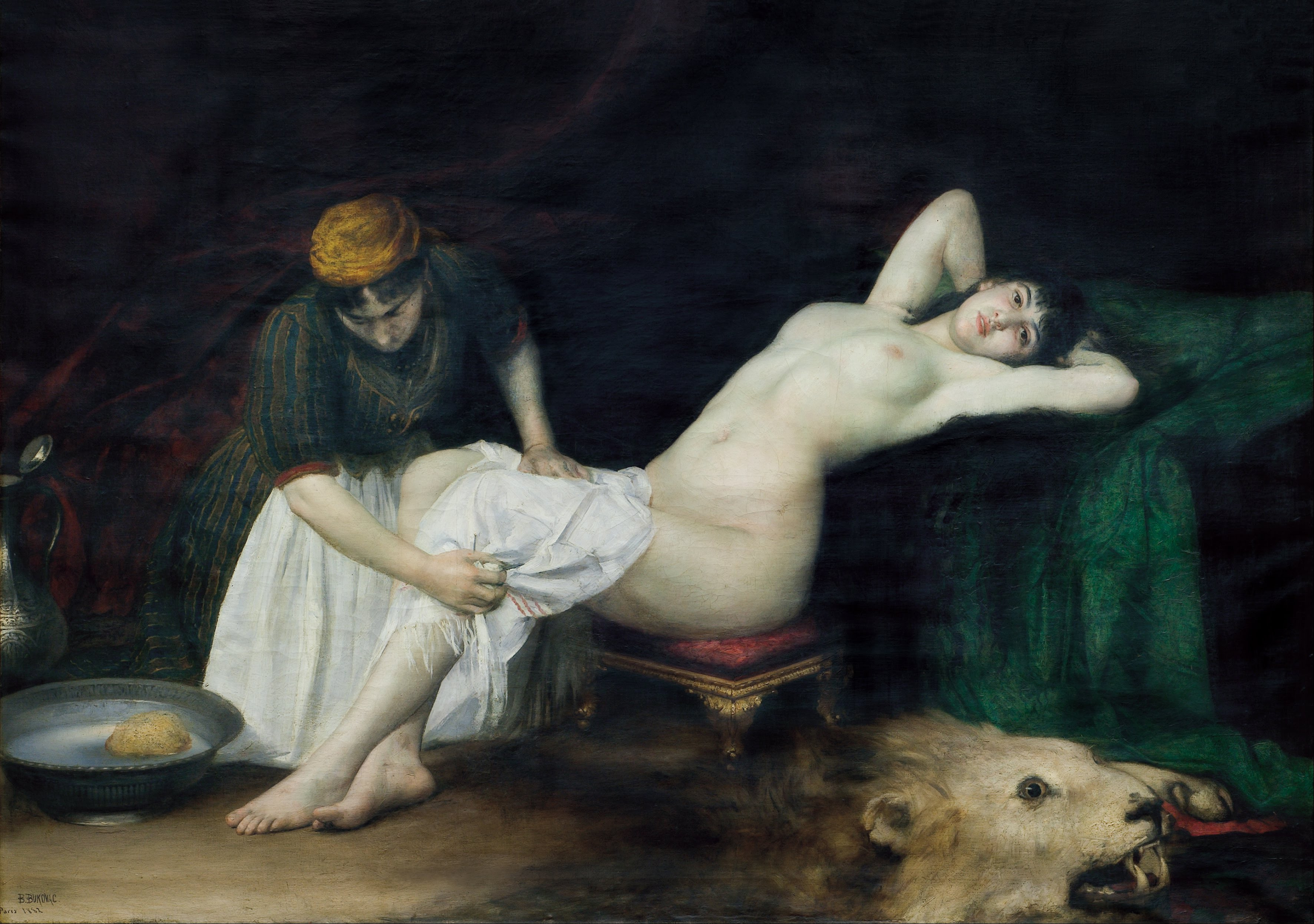
Vlaho Bukovac - La Grande Iza

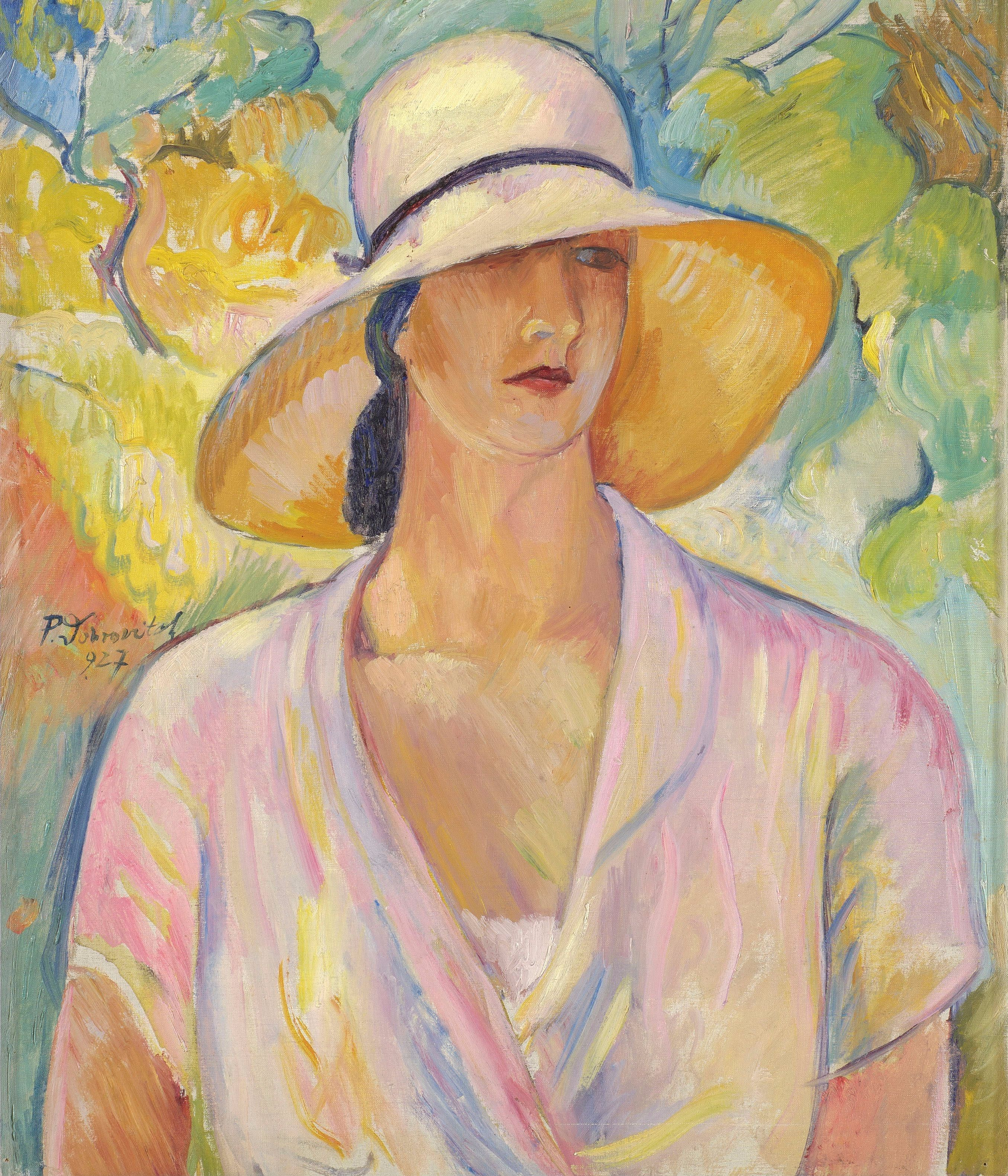
Petar Dobrović - Figure

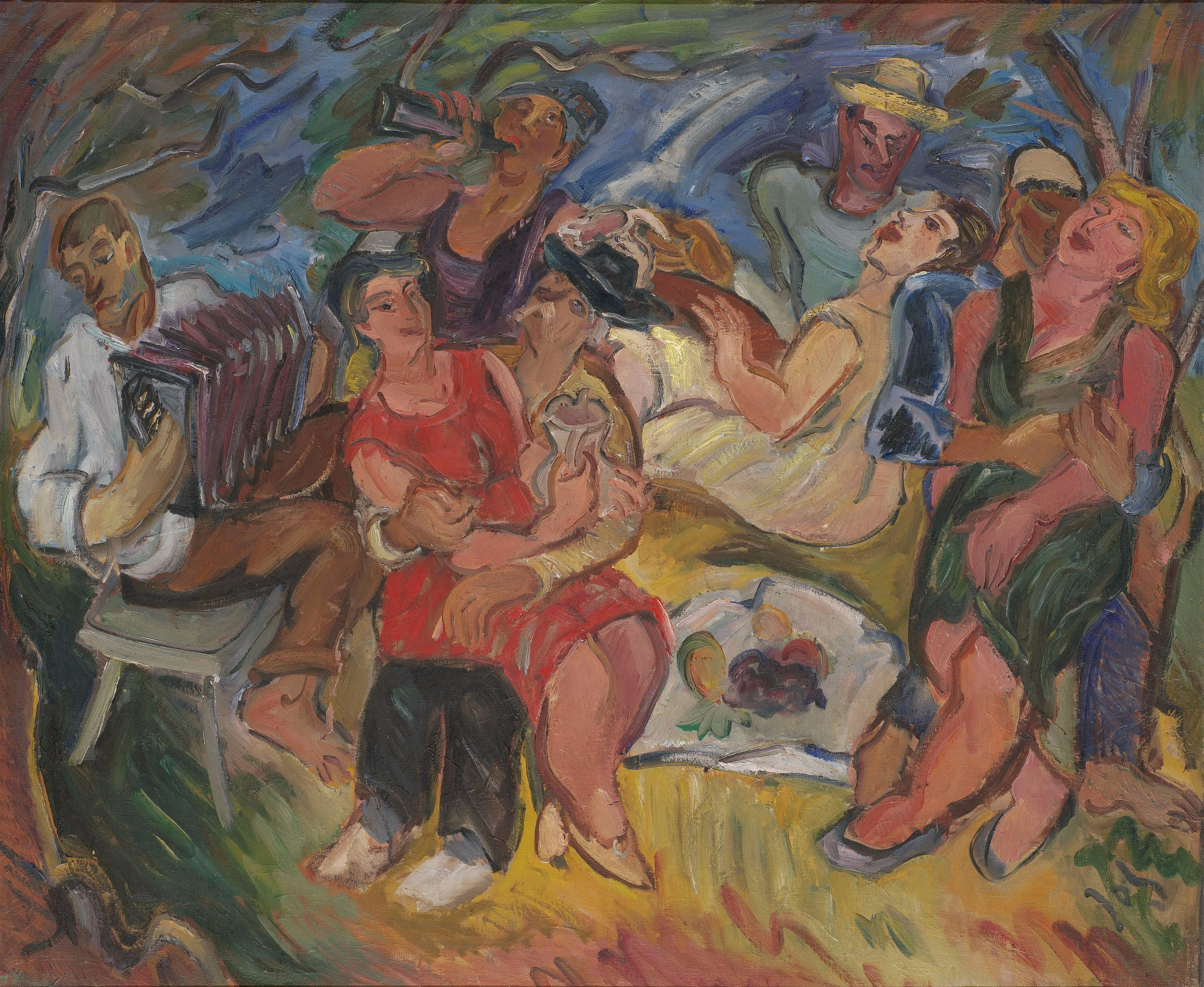
Ignjat Job - Sunday

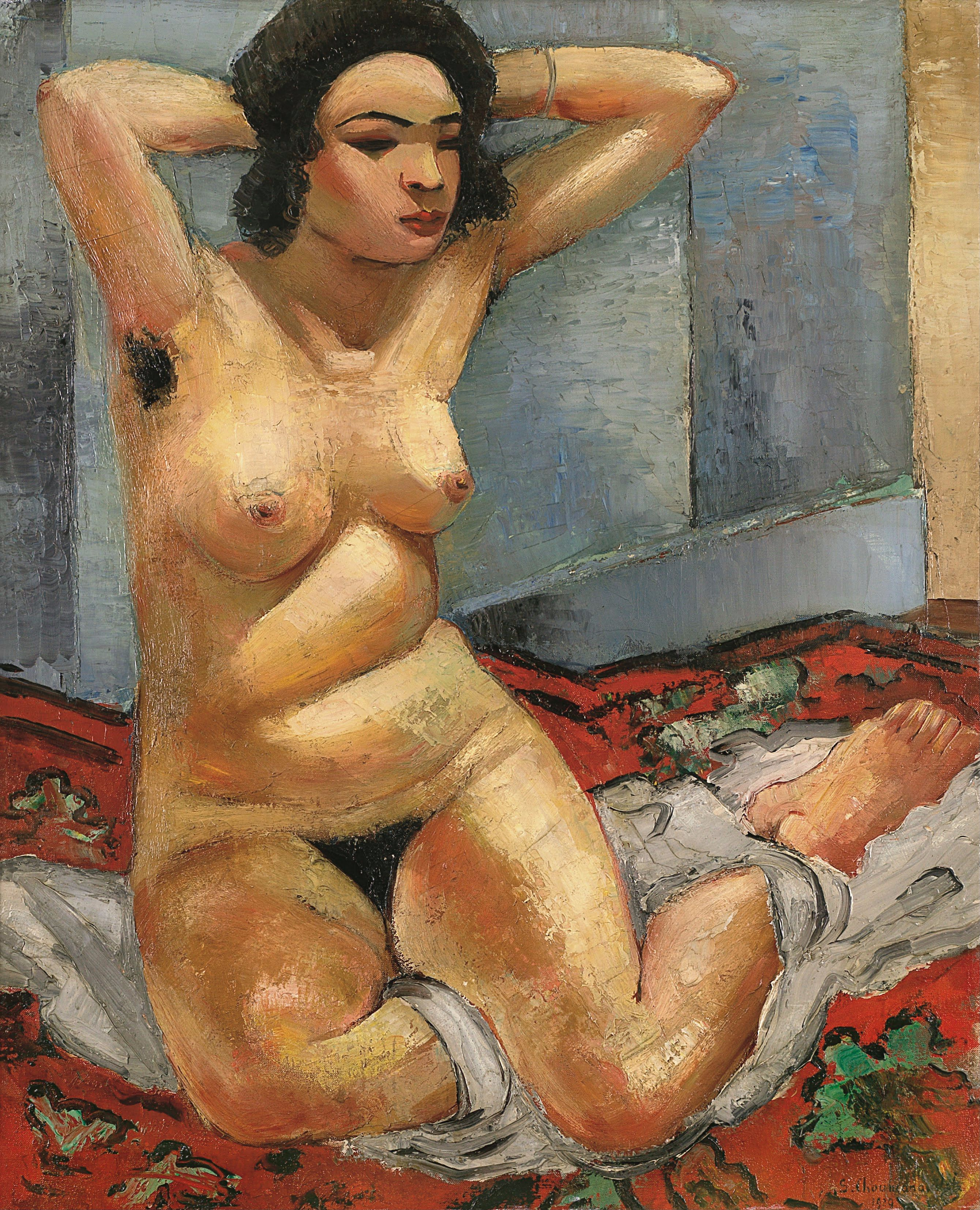
Sava Šumanović - Nude Woman

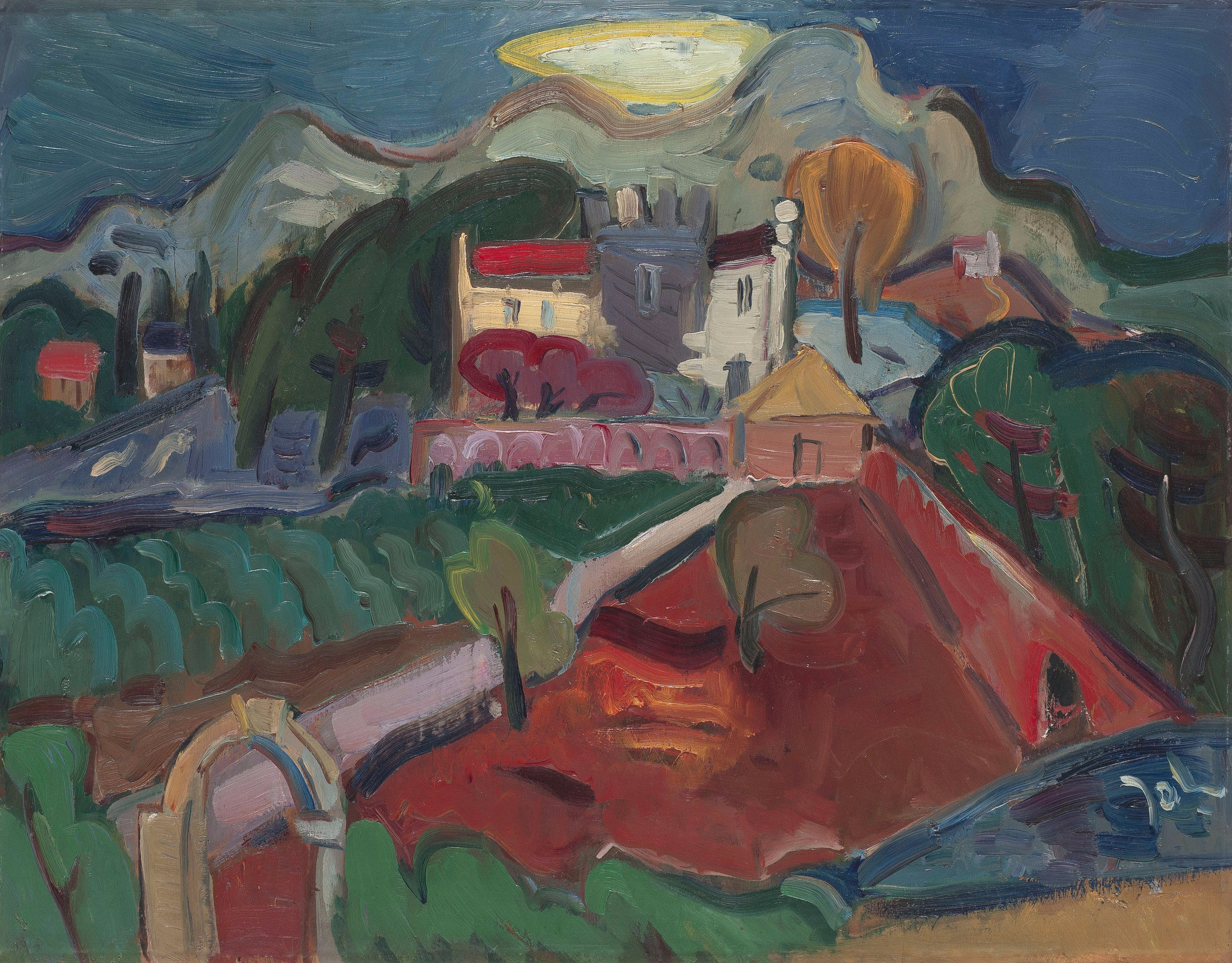
Ignjat Job - Lumbarda

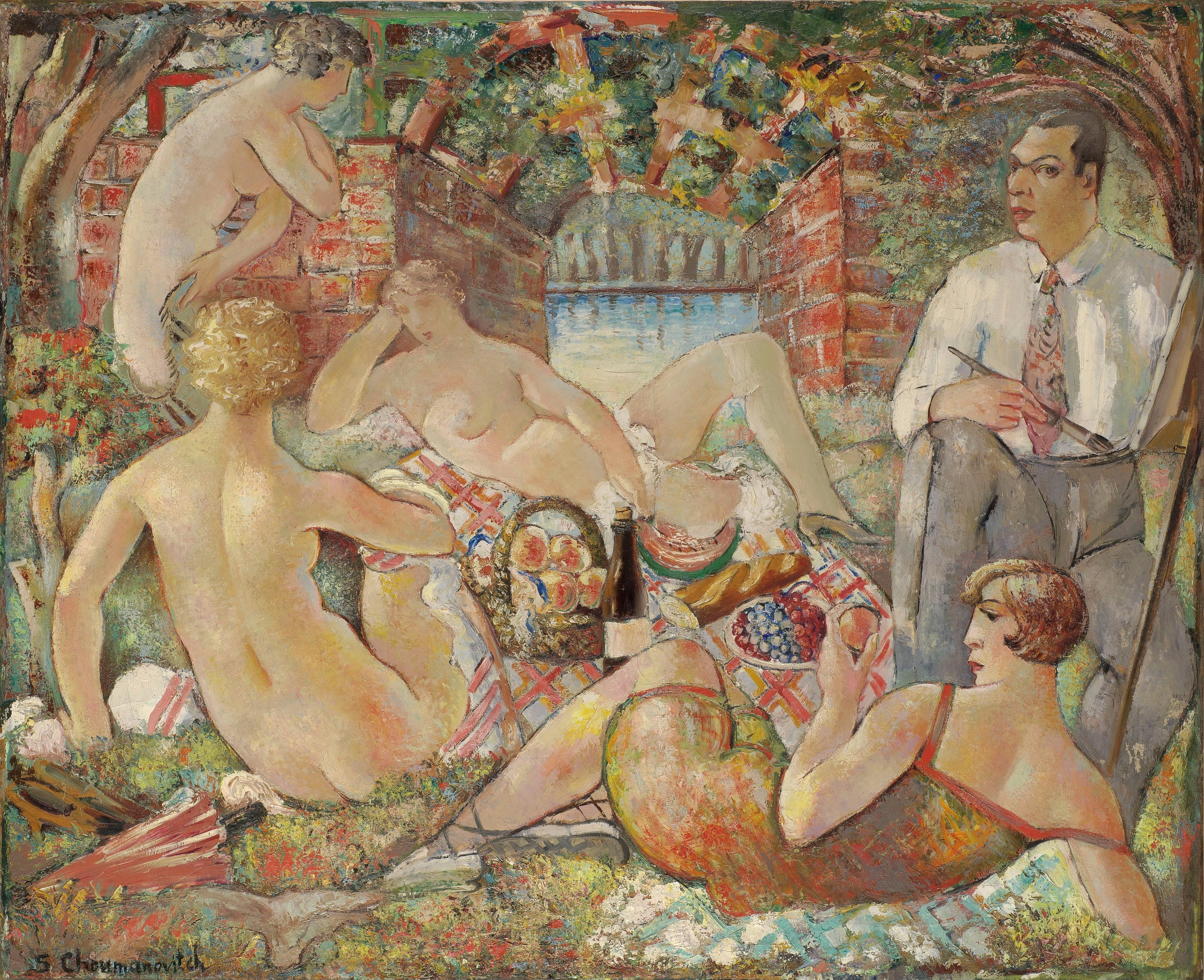
Sava Šumanović - Luncheon on the Grass

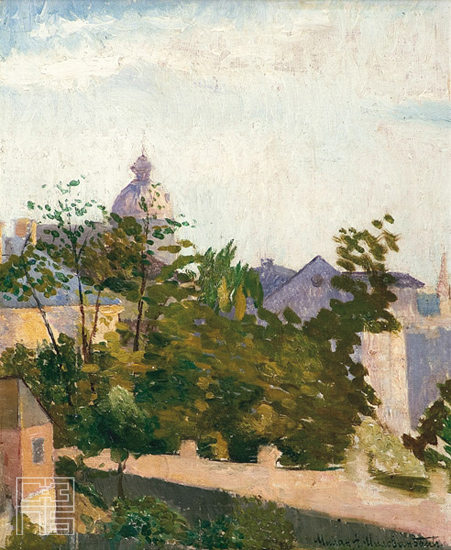
Milan Milovanović - Motiv iz Beograda (1909)

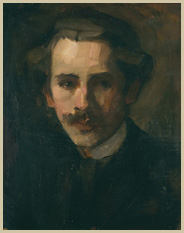
Milan Milovanović - Autoportret (1902)

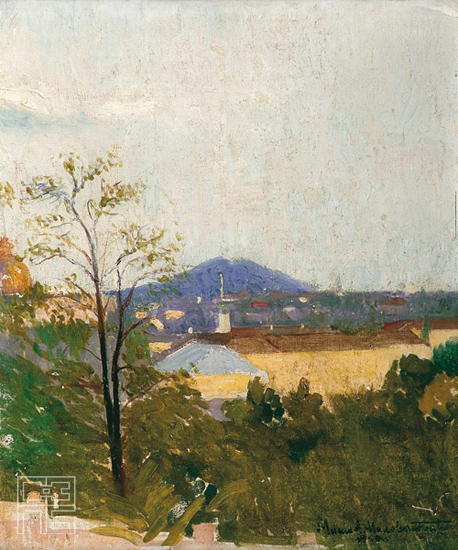
Milan Milovanović - Pogled na Avalu (1909)

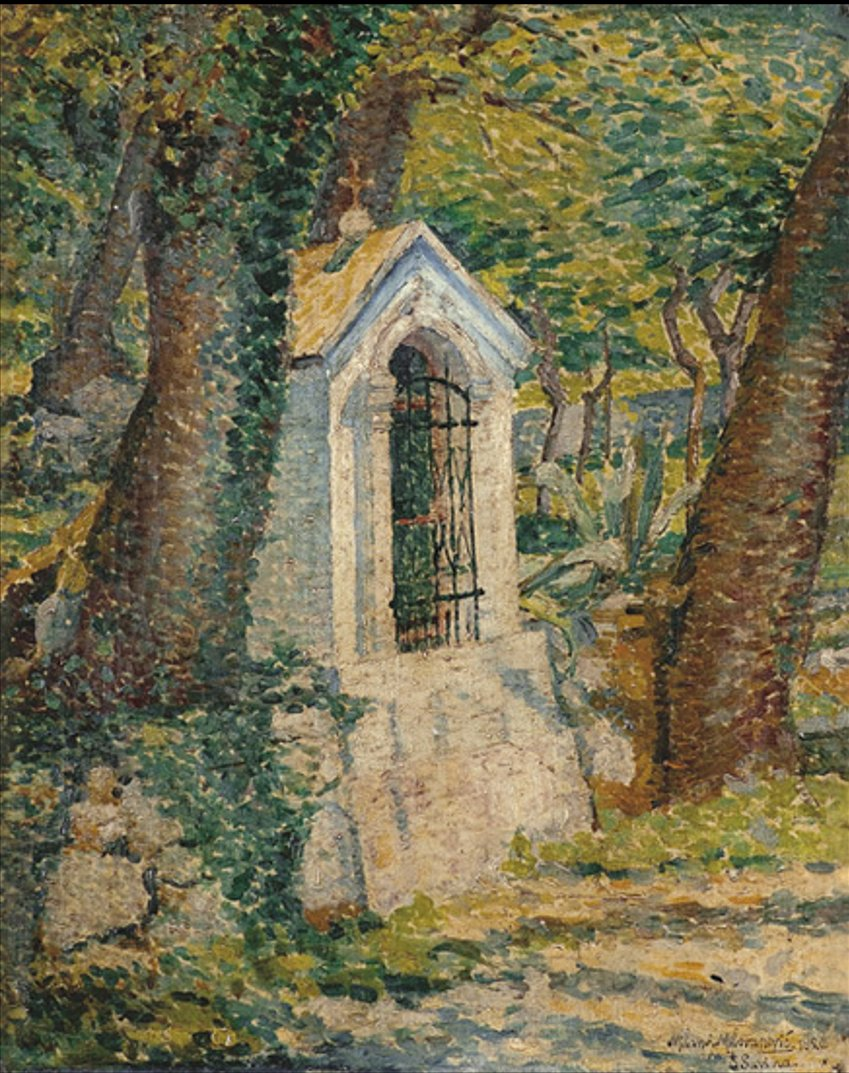
Milan Milovanović - Paraklis manastira Savine (1920)

== See also ==
- List of museums in Serbia
