= Petar Dobrović =

Serbian painter and politician (1890–1942)

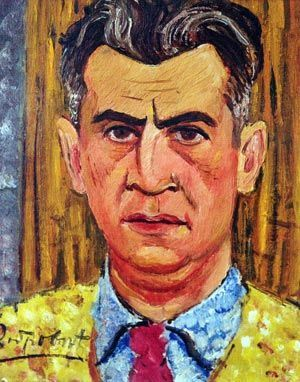
- A self-portrait from 1932

President of the Serbian-Hungarian Baranya-Baja Republic
- In office August 14, 1921 – August 20, 1921
- Preceded by: office established
- Succeeded by: office abolished

Personal details
- Born: 14 January 1890 Pécs, Austria-Hungary
- Died: 22 January 1942 (aged 52) Belgrade, Territory of the Military Commander in Serbia
- Relatives: Nikola Dobrović (brother)

Petar Dobrović (Serbian Cyrillic: Петар Добровић; pronounced [pêtar dǒːbroʋitɕ]; 14 January 1890 – 27 January 1942) was a Serbian painter and politician.

== Biography ==
Dobrović was born in Pécs, Kingdom of Hungary. A proponent of Serbian colorism, he was known for portraits and landscapes. He had earlier worked in impressionism and cubism.

He was briefly the President of a short-lived, small Serbian-Hungarian Baranya-Baja Republic in 1921, and later lived in Kingdom of Yugoslavia.

He died during the German occupation of Belgrade during the Second World War while in the elevator of the apartment building he lived in at 36 King Peter Street during a raid. He noticed the raid on the street and died while attempting to return to his flat. He is interred in the Belgrade New Cemetery.

== Exhibitions ==
Solo

- 1912 Premises of the Women's Society, Pécs
- 1919 Salon "Ulrich", Zagreb, City Hall, Novi Sad
- 1920 Druga beogradska gimnazija, Belgrade
- 1921 Stanković Hall, Belgrade
- 1924 Salon Manes, Prague
- 1925 Salon Galic, Split
- 1927 Stock Exchange Building, Novi Sad
- 1928 Great Hall of the County, Sombor, Society for the Advancement of Science and Art, Hall of the National Casino, Osijek, Art Pavilion, Zagreb
- 1929 Art Salon Šira, Zagreb, Ceremonial Hall of the Novi Sad Music High School, Novi Sad
- 1930 Art Pavilion, Belgrade
- 1931 Pulhri Studio, Prague, Kunstring, Rotterdam, Kunstzalen A. Mak, Amsterdam
- 1932 Denisuv Institut, Prague
- 1933 French Club, Belgrade
- 1934 Salon Ulrich, Zagreb. French Club, Belgrade
- 1936 French Club, Belgrade
- 1937 Matica Srpska Hall, Novi Sad
- 1940 Art Pavilion, Belgrade

Posthumous

- 1955 Art Pavilion "Cvijeta Zuzorić", Belgrade
- 1974 Museum of Contemporary Art, retrospective, Belgrade, Gallery "Petar Dobrović", Belgrade, Modern Gallery, Ljubljana
- 1981 Gallery of the Faculty of Fine Arts, Belgrade
- 1983 Petar Dobrović Gallery, Belgrade
- 1985 Gallery of Fine Arts, Belgrade
- 1990 Museum space, retrospective, Zagreb, Matica Srpska Gallery, Novi Sad, National Museum, Belgrade, Museum Janus Panonius, Pécs
- 1999 Petar Dobrović Gallery, Belgrade, Matica Srpska Gallery, Novi Sad
- 2001 Petar Dobrović Gallery, Belgrade

== Gallery ==
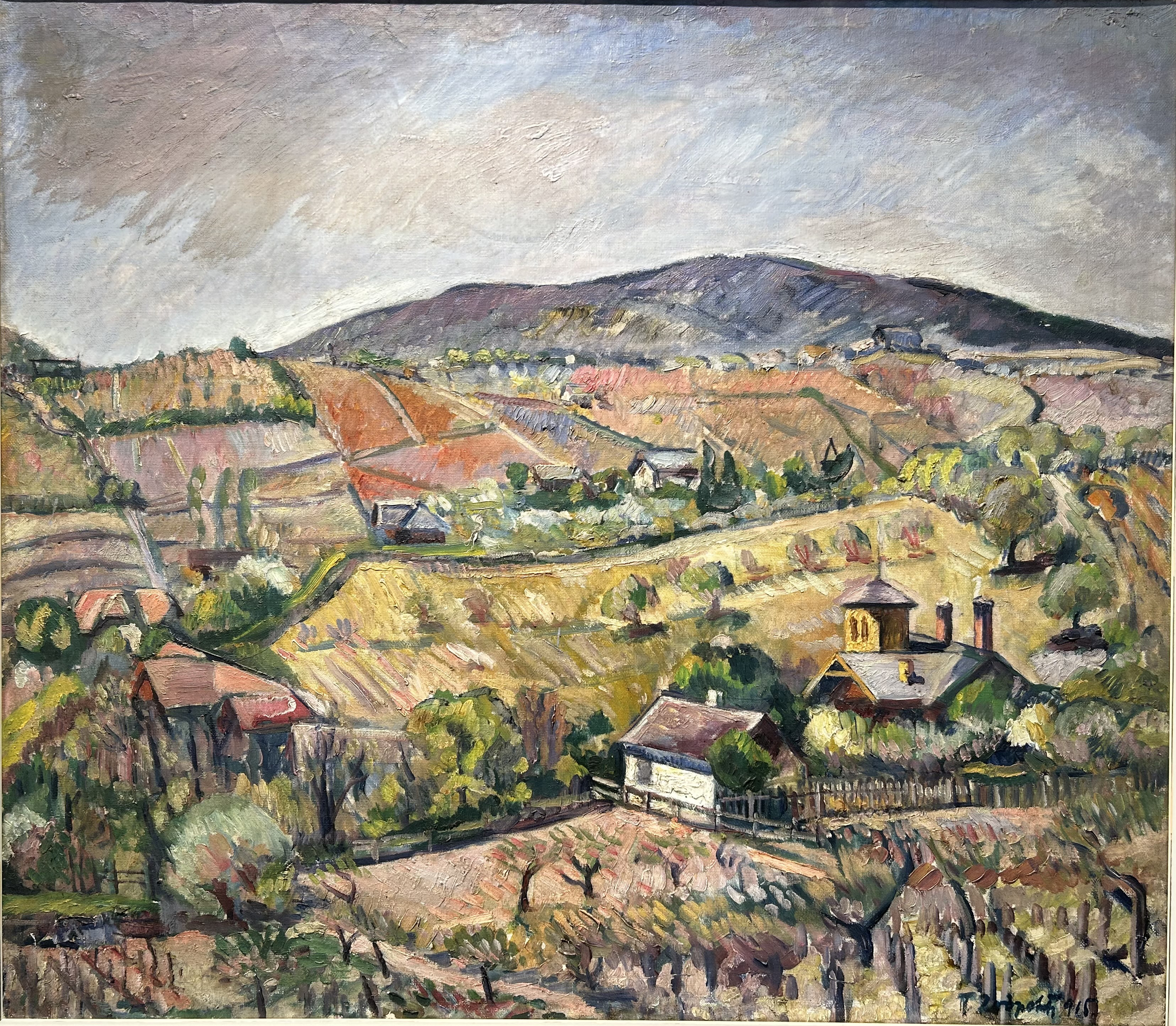
Wineyards in Baranja (1915), Pavle Beljanski Memorial Collection

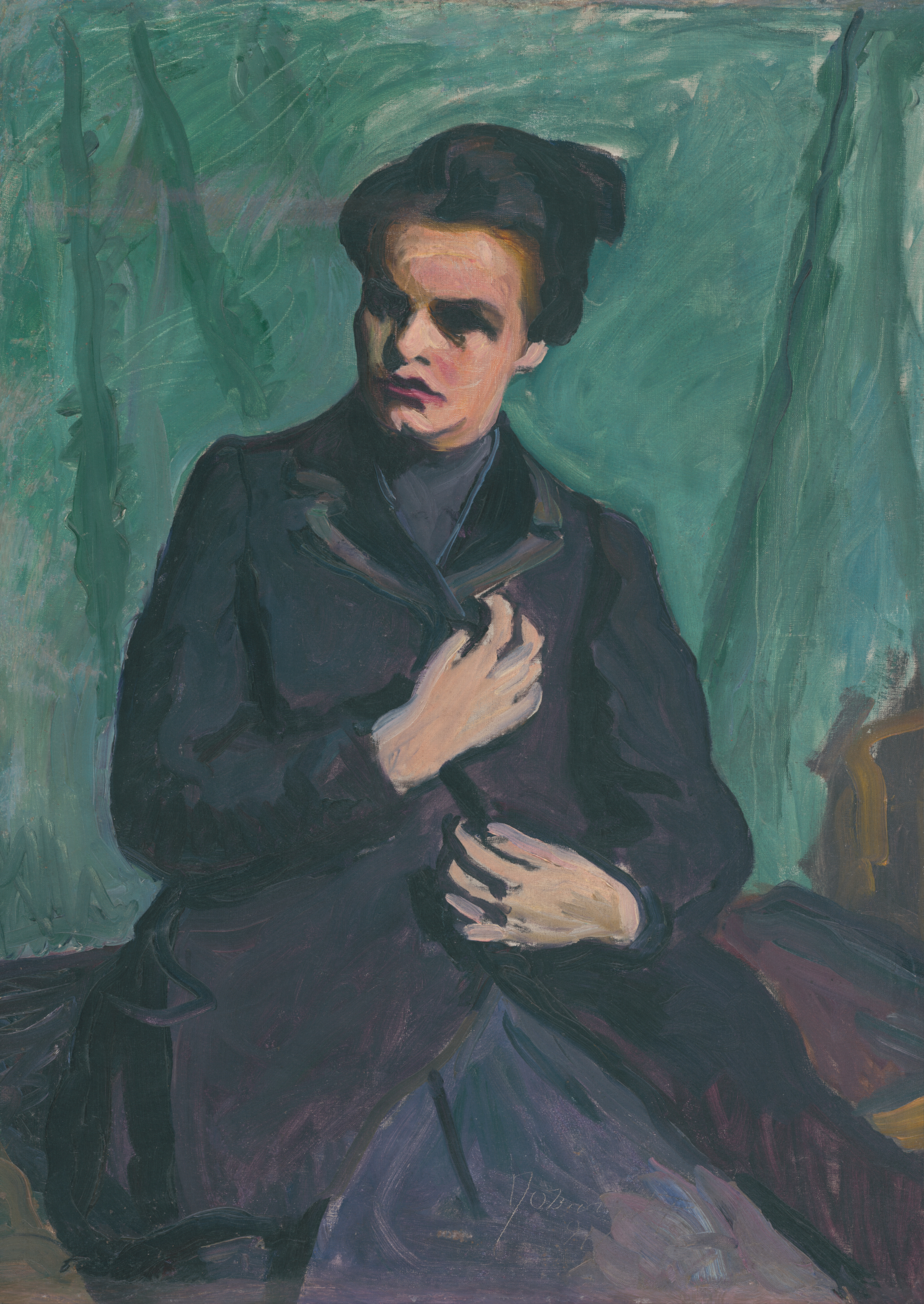
Study for a portrait (1917), Ernest Zmeták Art Gallery

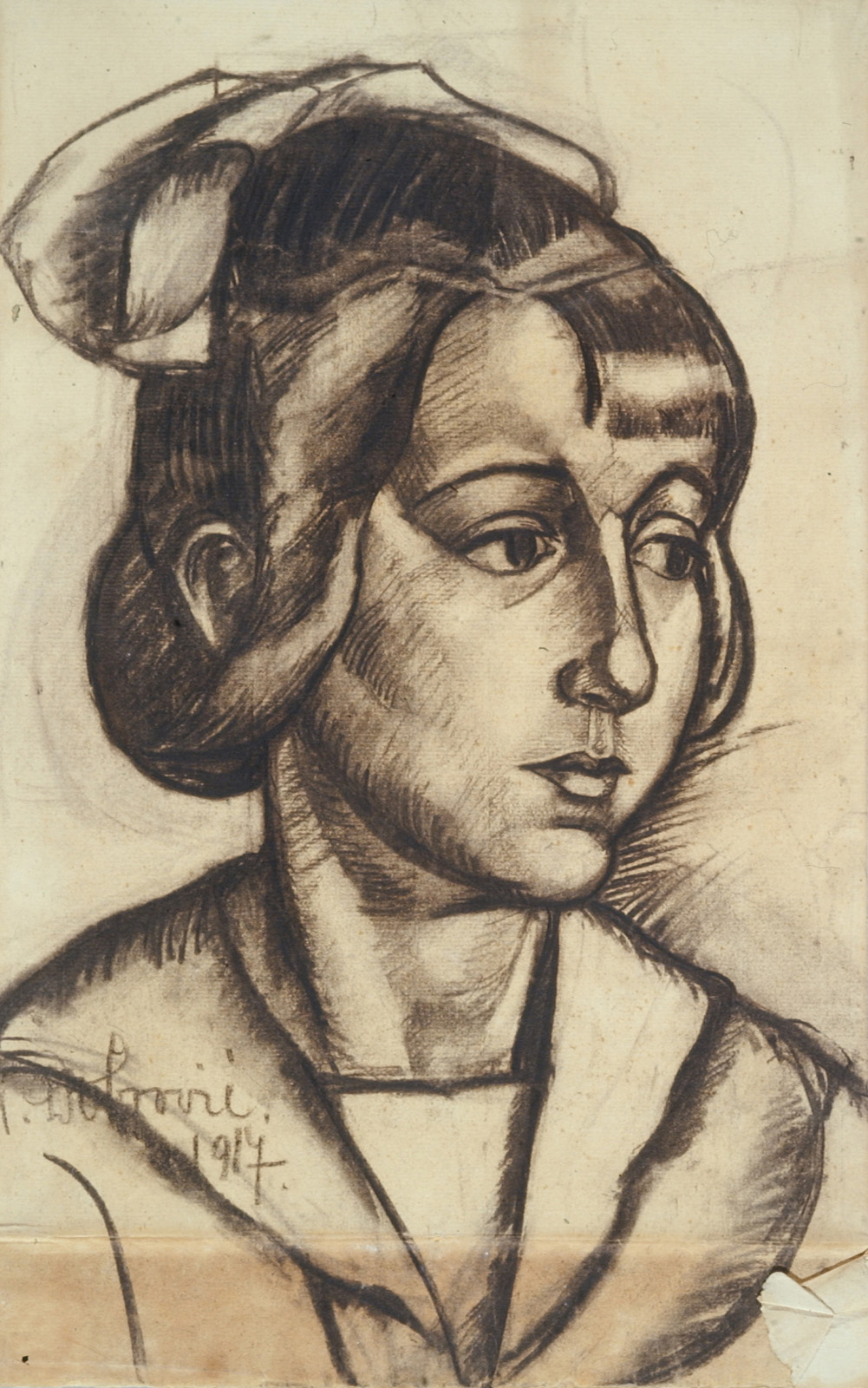
Girl's head (1917), National Gallery of Slovenia

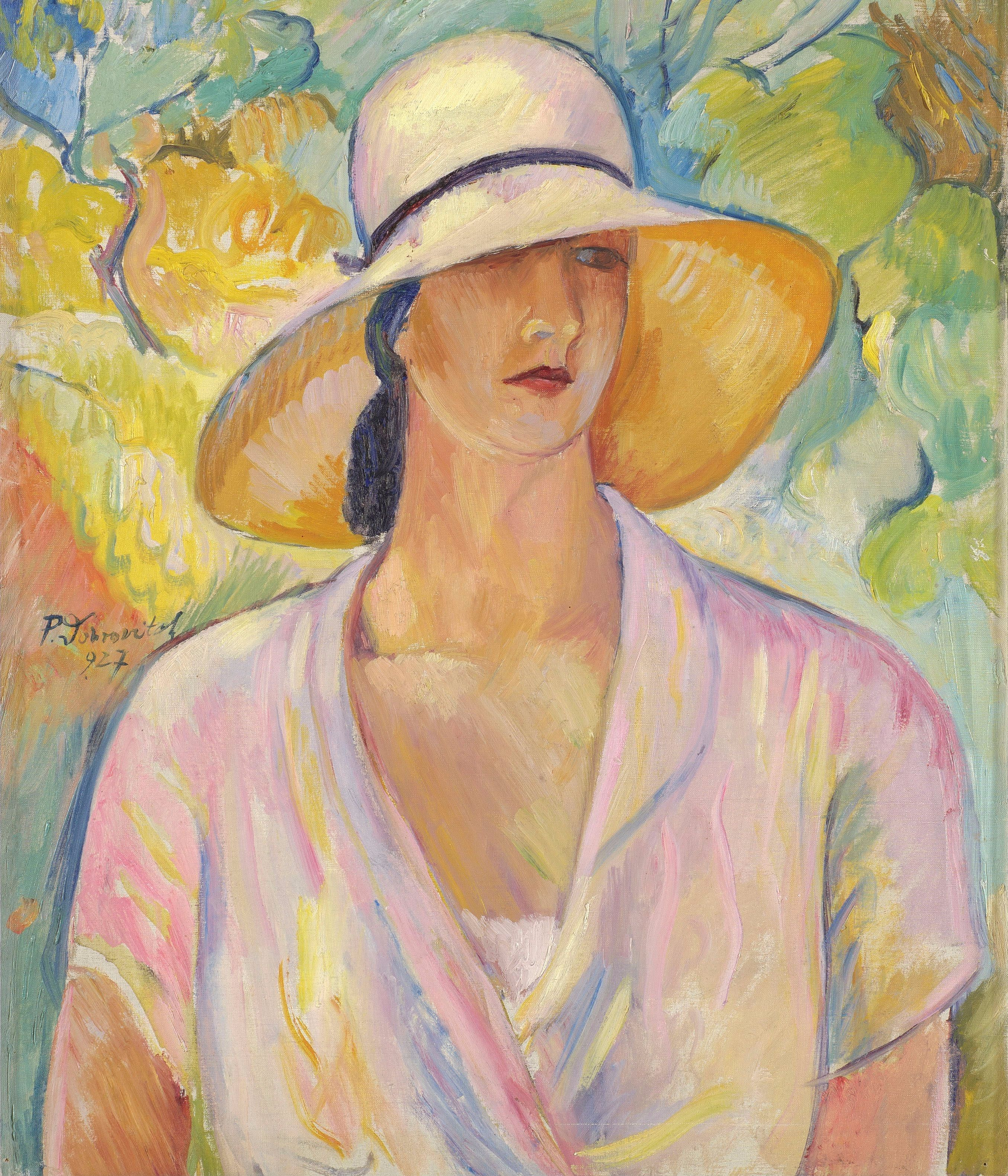
Figure (1927), Pavle Beljanski Memorial Collection

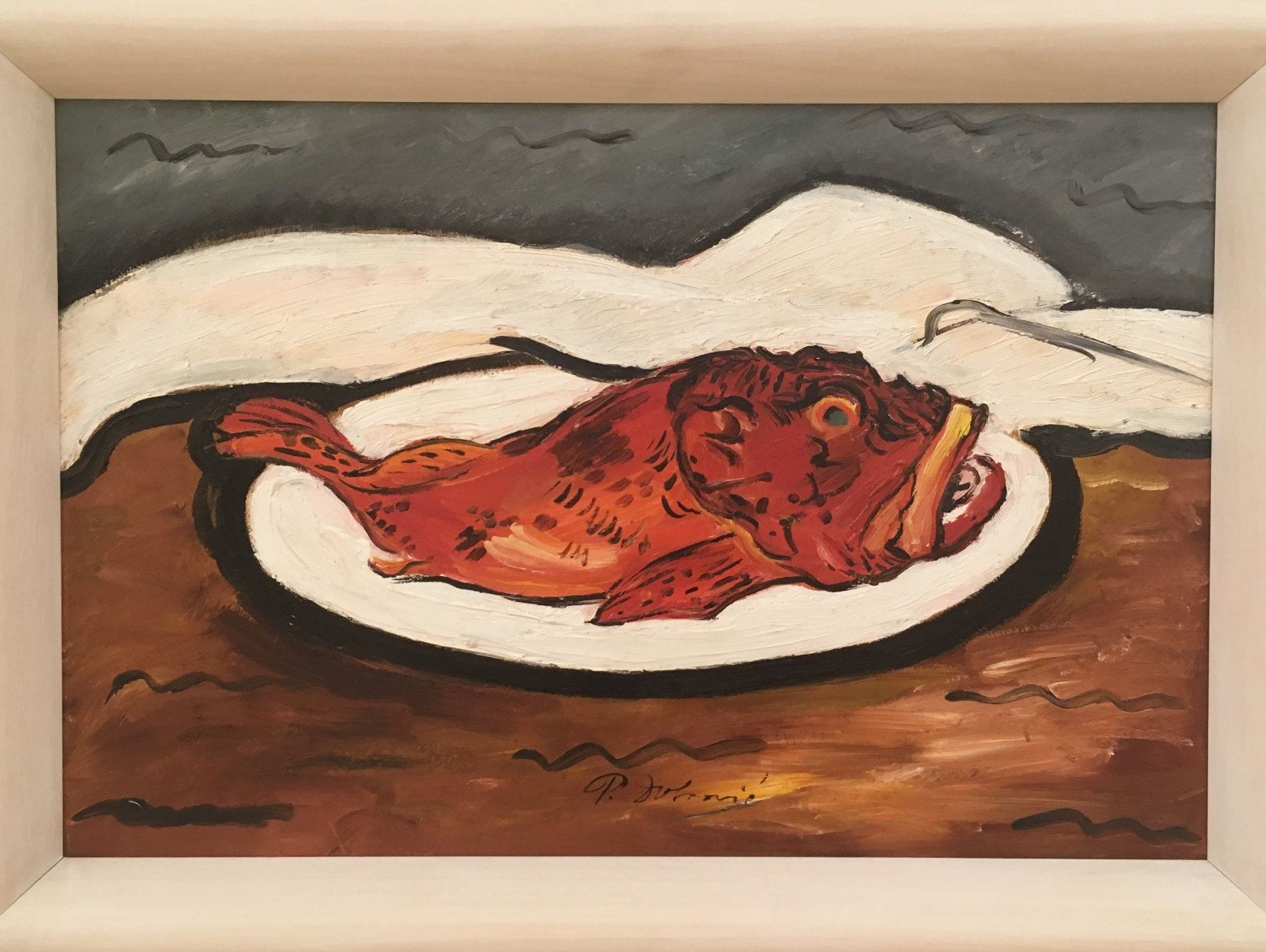
Škarpina (1928), Gallery of Fine Arts, Split

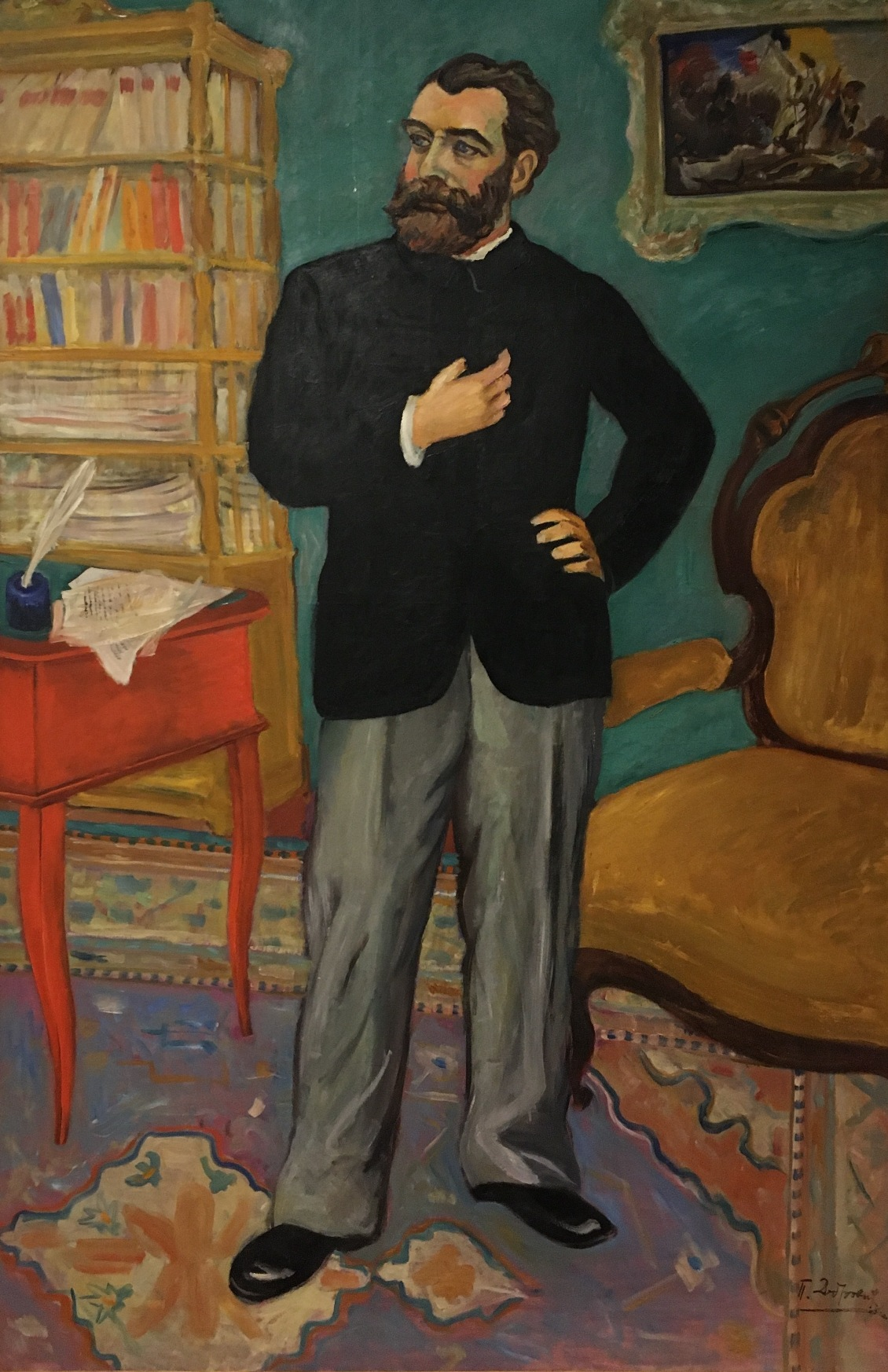
Svetozar Miletić, 1930

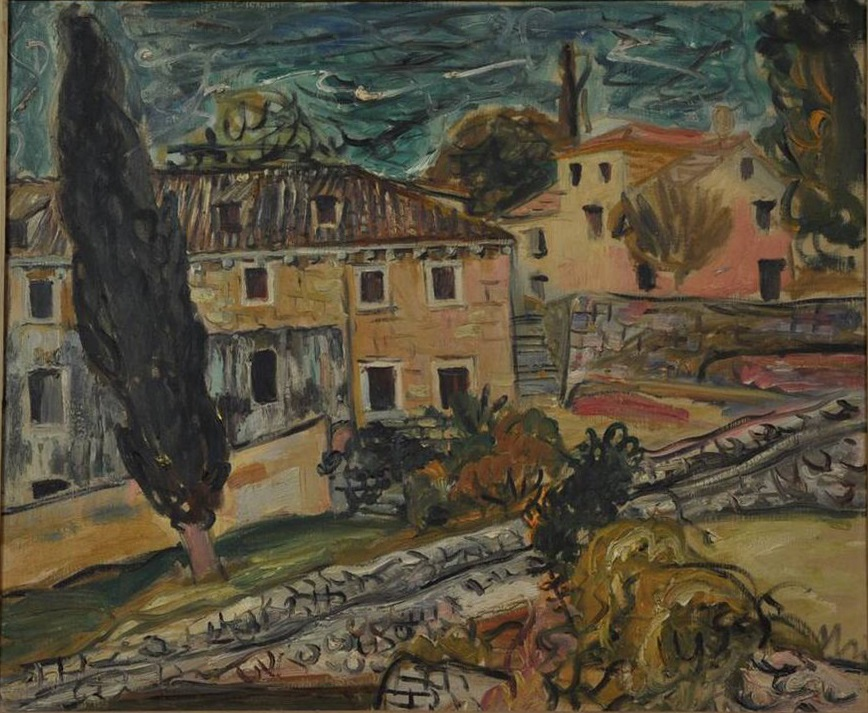
Landscape with Cypresses, Dalmatia (1931), Museum Boijmans Van Beuningen

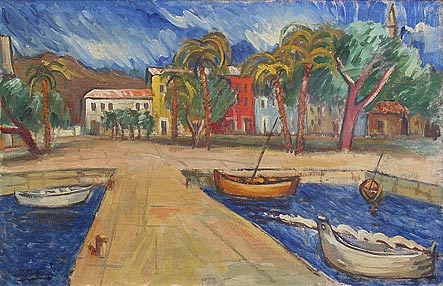
Mlini na jugu (1936)

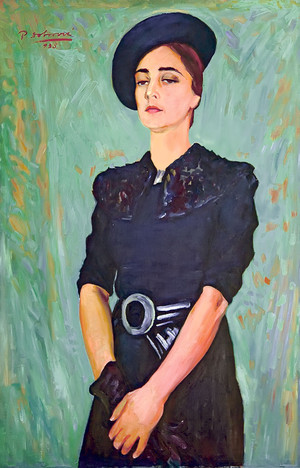
Portrait of Olga Dobrović (1938)

== See also ==
- List of Serbian painters
