= Rista Vukanović =

Serbian painter

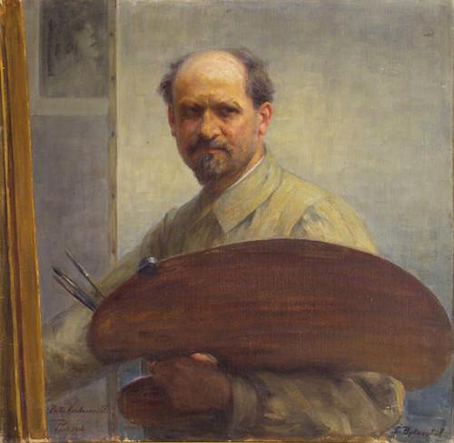
Rista Vukanović

Rista Vukanović also Risto Vukanović (Bugovina near Trebinje, Bosnia and Hercegovina, then under the Habsburg monarchy, 16 April 1873 – Paris, France, 16 January 1918) was a Serbian painter, the husband of painter Beta Vukanović who together founded an art school at the turn of the century that produced a generation of young Serbian artists after the Great War.

== Biography ==
Rista Vukanović was born in the village of Bugovina near Trebinje, where, like all Herzegovinians, burdened with talent and ambition, he made his way to the world from the humble homeland. He taught elementary school in Turnu Severin, Romania, and a high school in Belgrade. In 1890 he enrolled at the Imperial Academy of Fine Arts in Saint Petersburg as a State Fellow, and after a year he moved to Munich, where he continued his studies with Anton Ažbe and then with Wagner.

He mostly did portraits and paintings with a historical theme and was one of the most significant representatives of the Munich School in Impressionist art. He had exhibited at all Yugoslav exhibitions of the time, and in 1914 he participated in an exhibition at the Paris Salon.

Rista Vukanović met Babette Bachmayer at a private painting school in Munich in 1890. Between Beta (Babette) and one year younger, handsome Herzegovinian Rista, love was soon born, crowned with marriage, and the two left for Belgrade in 1898. The married Vukanović couple received permission from the Ministry of Education in 1899 to inherit the first Serbian painting and drawing school from the estate of its deceased founder, Kiril Kutlik. Rista took over the inventory of the school and with the same government subvention, started his own school with the help of his wife on 17 April 1900. In 1902, with the funds inherited by Beta from Germany, they constructed a new building which became their family house and an art school at the same time. From this school developed the Royal Art School in Belgrade and later the University of Arts in Belgrade.

During the First World War, when the Central Powers invaded Serbia, Rista and Beta Vukanović left with the Serbian Army over the mountains of Montenegro and Albania to Greece. After some time in Thessaloniki, Athens and Marseille, they arrived in Paris. During wartime, Rista acted as a Serbian schoolmaster in France. Near the end of the hostilities, Rista fell ill and died in a sanatorium in 1918, and was buried in Thiais cemetery in Paris, where nearly 750 Serb warriors were buried, seriously wounded on various fronts in World War I, and then transferred to France for treatment, where many died.
