= Analytical light scattering =

Analytical light scattering (ALS), also loosely referred to as SEC-MALS, is the implementation of static light scattering (SLS) and dynamic light scattering (DLS) techniques in an online or flow mode. A typical ALS instrument consists of an HPLC/FPLC chromatography system coupled in-line with appropriate light scattering and refractive index detectors. The advantage of ALS over conventional steady-state light scattering methods is that it allows separation of molecules/macromolecules on a chromatography column prior to analysis with light scattering detectors. Accordingly, ALS enables one to determine hydrodynamic properties of a single monodisperse species as opposed to bulk or average measurements on a sample afforded by conventional light scattering.
