= Beta Vukanović =

Serbian painter and centenarian (1872–1972)

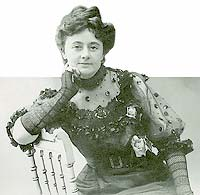
Beta Vukanovic Portrait

Beta Vukanović (Serbian Cyrillic: Бета Вукановић; 18 April 1872 – 31 October 1972), also known as Babette Bachmayer, was a Serbian painter and centenarian.

== Biography ==
Born in Bamberg, Upper Franconia, German Empire, she initially studied painting at the Kunstgewerbeschule in Munich. She also worked with Anton Ažbe. From 1898, she lived mostly in Belgrade. Her earliest works reflected the influence of plein-air painting in Munich, which changed to Impressionism before World War I. Her later style was predominantly realistic; she painted many pictures of the Serbian landscape and its people.

She originated Serbian artistic caricature and left around 500 humorous portraits of contemporaries from the social and cultural scene in Belgrade.

Beta Vukanović died in Belgrade, aged 100.

== Personal life ==
Her husband was an Impressionist painter, Rista Vukanović (1873–1918), recognized as one of the artists responsible for taking Serbian art into new directions. He studied at St Petersburg and Munich, later teaching at various institutions.

== See also ==
- List of Serbian centenarians
