= List of Estonian exile and émigré organizations =

List of Estonian exile and émigré organizations

== Background ==
The first significant wave of Estonian emigrants abroad occurred after the failure of the 1905 revolution in Estonia, which saw the arrival of over 60,000 people into the US by 1920 according to some government estimates. This led to the formation of many Estonian American socialist and communist organisations.

The next wave came after the annexation of Estonia by the Soviet Union, up to 70,000 people fled Estonia to the West. Around half of these people sought refuge in Germany and the remainder sought refuge in Sweden. With the end of the war, many ended up in displaced persons camps. Later, many of these emigrated to the United States, the UK, Canada and Australia. This exile community formed many organizations, most of these were cultural.

== Government in exile ==
- Estonian government in exile (Vabariigi Valitsus eksiilis)
- Estonian Legation in London (Eesti Saatkond Londonis)
- Estonian Consulate General in New York (Eesti peakonsulaat New Yorgis)

== International organizations ==
- Estonian World Council, (Ülemaailmne Eesti Kesknõukogu)
- Baltic World Conference
- The Baltic Council, (Balti Nõukogu)

== Political parties of the pre-war era with continued existence in exile ==
- Estonian Socialist Party's Foreign Association (Eesti Sotsialistliku Partei Välismaa Koondis)
- United Peasants' Party (Ühendatud Põllumeeste Erakond), from 1962 on: Estonian Democratic Union (Eesti Demokraatlik Unioon)

== Anti-communist organizations ==
- Eesti Vabadusliit was formed in Berlin on February 5, 1945, by SS-Obersturmbannführer Harald Riipalu, and Ain-Ervin Mere. The organization later operated in Sweden, also using the Swedish name Estniska frihetsförbundet.
- World Legion of Estonian Liberation, (Ülemaailmne Eesti Vabadusvõitlejate Liit)
- Committee for Free Estonia
- Anti-Bolshevik Bloc of Nations
  - Estonian Liberation Movement (Eesti Vabadusliikumine)
  - Union of the Estonian Fighters for Freedom (Eesti Vabadusvõitlejate Liit)

== National organizations ==
=== United Kingdom ===
- London Estonian Society (Londoni Eesti Selts), (founded in 1921)
- Estonian Relief Committee (Eesti Vabastuskomitee), (established in 1944)
- Association for Estonians in Great Britain (1947)
- The Baltic Association in Great Britain

=== United States ===
- Legion of Estonian Liberation Inc
- Estonian American National Council Inc (Eesti Rahvuskomitee Ühendriikides) (1952)

=== Sweden ===
- Estonian Agronomic Society in Sweden (Eesti Agronoomide Selts Rootsis)
- Estonian National Congress in Sweden (Rootsi Eestlaste Liit)
- Eesti Komitee
- Eesti Kultuuri Koondis Rootsis
- The Baltic Committee in Sweden, (Balti Komitee Rootsis)
- Estonian Learned Society in Sweden (Eesti Teaduslik Selts Rootsis; established in 1945; associated with Estonian Academy of Sciences)
- Estonian School in Stockholm (established in 1945)

=== Canada ===
- Estonian Central Council in Canada or Eestlaste Kesknõukogu Kanadas (EKN)
- League of Estonian Artists in Toronto (Estonian: Eesti Kunstnike Koondis Torontos), established in 1956

== Estonia Houses ==
- Stockholm (Stockholmi Eesti Maja)
- New York Estonian House (New Yorgi Eesti Maja)
- Toronto (Toronto Eesti Maja)
- Los Angeles (Los Angelese Eesti Maja)

=== United Kingdom ===
- Estonian House, London, (Londoni Eesti Maja)
- Bradford 'Eesti Kodu' Club, opened in 1956
- Estonian House Club, Leicester (Leicesteri Eesti Maja), opened in 1960, was visited by President Lennart Meri in 2000.

== Newspapers and magazines ==
Name	City	Country	Years Published	Frequency	Comments
Adelaide Eesti Seltsi Teataja (Adelaide Estonian Club Gazette)	Adelaide	Australia	1958-1971	4 times per year	
Ameerika Eestlane (The American Estonian)	New York	USA	1925	weekly	
Amerika Eesti Postimees (Estonian Courier of America)	New York	USA	1897-1911	6 times a year	
Baltimore Eesti Organisatsioonide Bülletään (Baltimore Estonian Organization Bulletin)	Baltimore	USA	1965-	10 times per year	
Edasi (Forward)	Leningrad	Soviet Union	1917-1937	?	
Eesti Elu (Estonian Life)	Toronto	Canada	2001-	weekly	Website. Merged Vaba Eestlane and Meie Elu.
Eesti Hääl (Estonian Voice)	London	United Kingdom	1947-	originally weekly, now monthly	Website
Eesti Noortetöö	Stockholm	Sweden	1961-1984	4 times per year	
Eesti Päevaleht (Estonian Daily)	Stockholm	Sweden	1959-	originally daily, now weekly	Website
Eesti Post (Estonian Post)	Geislingen	Germany	1945-1953	irregular	For members of Geislingen displaced persons camp
Eesti Post (Estonian Post)	initially Stockholm, later Malmö	Sweden	1950-1975	?	
Eesti Rada	Cologne	Germany	1945-	initially 1-2 times per week, later 6 times per year	Website
Eesti Rahvusfondi Teated	Stockholm	Sweden	1947-1960	irregular	
Eesti Sõna (Estonian Word)	Berlin	Germany	1941-1945	6 days per week	
Elagu	Melbourne	Australia	1983-1988	?	For youths
Esto America	New York	USA	1983-1984	monthly	
Kirjad Gaidjuhtidele	Sävedalen	Sweden	1958-1966	2 times per year	For scout leaders
Kodumaa (Homeland)	Tallinn	Estonian SSR	1958-1991	weekly	Published by VEKSA (The Society for the Development of Cultural Ties with Estonians Abroad) in Estonia and sent to Estonians in exile
Kratt : Kotkajärve Teataja	Muskoka	Canada	1979-1988	4 times per year	
Kultuuriside : Eesti Kultuurifondi teataja	New York	USA	1967-1996	1-2 times per year	
Kündja	Riga	Russian Empire	1882-1891	originally weekly, then monthly	
Lakewood Ekspress	Lakewood, NJ	USA	1997-1999	irregular	
Laste Sõber : noorte kirik (Children's Friend)	Västerås	Sweden	1957-1980	4 times per year	
Läti Eestlane (Estonian of Latvia)	Riga	Latvia	1928	weekly	
Malevlane	Helsinki	Finland	1943-1944	irregular	For Estonian volunteer soldiers in Finland
Meie Elu (Our Life)	Toronto	Canada	1950-2001	weekly	Merged into Eesti Elu
Meie Kodu (Our Home)	Sydney	Australia	1949-	weekly	Website
Meie Post (Our Post)	Stockholm	Sweden	1962-1987	10-12 times per year	
Mõttekriips : Eesti Üliõpilaskonna Sydneys häälekandja	Sydney	Australia	1955-1977	irregular	For university students
Peterburi Teataja	St Petersburg	Russia	1908–1918, 1999-	originally ?, now 4 times per year	Called Pealinna Teataja in 1910, 1914–1917. Website
Rahva Hääl (Voice of the People)	Moscow	Soviet Union	1942-1944	irregular	
Säde	Leningrad	Soviet Union	1927-1929	irregular	
Sõnumid	Detmold	Germany	1946-1948	weekly	
Stockholms-Tidningen eestlastele	Stockholm	Sweden	1944-1959	6 times per week	
Teataja (The Herald)	Stockholm	Sweden	1944-2002	ranged from weekly to monthly	Called Eesti Teataja from 1945 to 1953
Töömees (The Workman)	Oakland	USA	1907-1908	irregular	
Uus Eesti (New Estonia)	Stockholm	Sweden	1973-1976	?	
Usk ja Elu (Faith and Life)	Riga	Russian Empire	1908-1917	weekly	
Tuulemaa (Land of Wind)	Stockholm	Sweden	1960-1976	irregular	
Uus Ilm (New World)		USA	1909-1989	weekly until 1950, monthly afterwards	Communist
Vaba Eesti Sõna (Free Estonian Word)	New York	USA	1949-	weekly	Website
Vaba Eestlane (Free Estonian)	Toronto	Canada	1952-2001	2 times per week	Merged into Eesti Elu
Vabaduse Kuulutus : eestikeelse vaimuliku raadiosaate Vabaduse Kuulutuse informatsioonileht	Toronto	Canada	1958-1969	irregular	
Valgus: evangeelne ajakiri (The Light: evangelical magazine)	Örebro	Sweden	1950-1954	6 times per year	Moved to Toronto in 1955
Valgus: evangeelne ajakiri (The Light: evangelical magazine)	Toronto	Canada	1955-1993	6 times per year	Moved to Tallinn in 1994
Välis-Eesti	Stockholm	Sweden	1944-1995	irregular	
Virgats	Adelaide	Australia	1971-	monthly	
Võitleja (The Combatant)	Toronto	Canada	1952-	originally monthly, now 4 times per year	For veterans

The Estonian National Library has a digitized archive of many of these publications.

== Other ==
In 2012, the web portal Estonian World Review (www.eesti.ca) was opened. The goal of the portal is to link and show all Estonia-related actions over the world. The portal is registered in Ontario, Canada.

- Museum of Estonians Abroad
