= Parikas brothers =

Estonian photographers who worked together

George Johannes Parikas (30 October 1880 – 22 October 1958) and Peeter Parikas (10 April 1889 – 8 July 1972 Sweden), collectively known as the Parikas brothers, were Estonian photographers.

In 1910, the brothers established a photo studio and publishing house (the company Foto Parikas) in Tallinn. In 1912, the studio received rights to photograph in theatres. In 1949, the studio was nationalised and the studio was acquired by the Estonian SSR Theatre Union. The studio's archive consisted of over 20,000 portrait photos. Today the photos are scattered among Estonian memory institutions.

Together with the Märska brothers, Theodor and Konstantin, the Parikas brothers also managed Estonia's first film union: Estonia-Film (registered in 1920). From 1926 to 1931, the brothers published the film magazine Filmileht.

== Works ==
From 1910 to 1940 they published several publications:

- photo album: Tallinn 700 (1920)
- photo album: Eesti sõnas ja pildis (1923, 1930)
- educational photo book: Fotograafia õperaamat, 1911
