= Peter Leoke =

Estonian publisher (1892–1973)

- Born: May 21, 1892; Viljandi, Estonia
- Died: April 22, 1973 (aged 80); Los Angeles, California
- Occupations: Publisher and diaspora activist

Peter Leoke (May 21, 1892 – April 22, 1973) was an Estonian publisher and activist in the Estonian diaspora movement.

== Early life and education ==
Peter Leoke was born in Viljandi, Estonia, the third son of Hans Leoke (a.k.a. Lõuk or Löuk, 1853–1919), the owner of a local bookstore, and Mari Leoke (née Tõllasepp, 1867–1954). He graduated from Imperial Nicholas I High School in Tallinn and studied architecture at the Riga and Moscow polytechnics from 1913 to 1916. He was a member of the Riga-based fraternal student society Korporatsioon Vironia.

== Career ==
During the establishment of the Republic of Estonia, Peter Leoke participated in setting up consulates in 1918 in Helsinki and in 1919 in Riga. He took part in the Estonian War of Independence in the artillery and completed his service in 1921 as the commander of a heavy battery. In the same year, he joined the Ministry of Foreign Affairs as a secretary, and the following year he helped the Estonian envoy Tõnis Vares establish the Estonian embassy in Moscow.

Leoke founded the publishing house Areng, which published the magazine Romaan. He was one of the founders of the first private theater studio in Estonia (the director was Paul Sepp) in 1920.

In 1924, Leoke settled in New York. He was a member of the board of the Estonian society Edu and from 1926 its chairman. He contributed to the establishment of the weekly newspaper Ameerika Eestlane and was later its managing editor. He was the founder of the Estonian Club of New York and served as its chairman multiple times. He was a board member of the New York Estonian War of Independence Veterans League and later the Veterans Association. He was a member of the editorial board of the monthly magazine Meie Tee.

In 1941, he settled in California, where he worked in aviation. He died in Los Angeles. Peter Leoke is buried in Forest Lawn Memorial Park in Hollywood Hills, Los Angeles.
