= Boris Jaanikosk =

Estonian actor (1897–1976)

- Born: Boris Jankovski; June 16, 1897
- Died: June 1, 1976 (aged 78)
- Resting place: Pärnamäe Cemetery, Tallinn, Estonia
- Occupation: Actor

Boris Jaanikosk (born Boris Jankovski, later Boris Borissoff; June 16, 1897 – June 1, 1976) was an Estonian film actor and film director.

== Life and work ==
Boris Jaanikosk was born Boris Jankovski and later Estonianized his family name to Jaanikosk. In 1929, Jaanikosk played one of the leading roles in the Estonian film production Jüri Rumm, directed by Johannes Loop. The film premiered in December 1929. In 1930, he directed the first musical film in Estonian film history. The short film Kuldämblik (The Golden Spider), for which he also wrote the screenplay, was also the first Estonian sound film. The black-and-white film is considered lost.

In the 1950s, Boris Jaanikosk worked as an editor for the Soviet Estonian newsreel Filmikroonika.

Boris Jaanikosk is buried in Pärnamäe Cemetery (Estonian: Pärnamäe kalmistu) in Tallinn in the special area of the Estonian Cinema Association.

== Filmography ==
- 1929: Jüri Rumm as the baron
- 1930: Kuldämblik (director)
- 1946: Nõukogude Eesti (director)
- 1947: Kalevite hõim (director)
- 1948: Eesti põlevkivi (director)
- 1949: Aastaplaan suureks pidupäevaks (director)
- 1949: Lõikuspüha (director)
- 1949: Üleliiduliselt naiste maleturniirilt (director)
- 1949: Väärikas vahetus (director)
- 1949: Võrumaa põllumajanduslik näitus (director)
- 1951: Tulevased meremehed (director)
- 1952: Kukruse põlevkivikaevanduses (director)
- 1952: Linnukasvatuse katsejaam (director)
- 1952: Stahhaanovlaste vabariiklik nõupidamine (director)
- 1952: Unustamatu 1919 (director)
