= Mihkel Lepper =

Estonian actor (1900–1980)

Mihkel Lepper (also Mihhail Lepper; 13 March 1900 Warsaw – 2 May 1980 Stockholm) was an Estonian actor.

Before 1940 he worked at the film studio Estonia-Film in Tallinn.

== Filmography ==
- 1924: Mineviku varjud (feature film; role: Konrad von Eulenberg, knight commander)
- 1925: Tšeka komissar Miroštšenko (feature film; role: Miroštšenko, Soviet Russia commissar)
- 1928: Herkules Maier (German silent film, Reinhold Schünzel Film; role ?)
- 1929: Dollarid ('Dollars') (comedy film; director)
- 1929: Jüri Rumm (feature film; role: gendarme officer, baron's relative)
