= Nikolai Root =

Russian–Estonian painter (1870–1960)

- Born: November 24, 1870; Saint Petersburg, Russia
- Died: May 10, 1960 (aged 89); Tallinn, Estonia
- Resting place: Metsakalmistu
- Occupation: Painter

Nikolai Root (Russian: Николай Федорович Роот, November 24, 1870 – May 10, 1960) was a Russian–Estonian painter.

== Early life and education ==
Nikolai Root was born in Saint Petersburg. He studied at the Académie Julian in Paris 1895 and with Anton Ažbe in Munich in 1897. In 1900, he graduated from the Imperial Academy of Arts in Saint Petersburg, and he received an invitation to teach drawing in pedagogy courses.

== Career ==
Root started working as a drawing teacher in Yerevan in 1900. Because he had also studied ceramics, he directed the Kamianets-Podilskyi Ceramics School in Ukraine from 1909 to 1912, and then was the founder and first director of the Pskov Art Industry School from 1913 to 1919. In 1919, Root settled in Tallinn, where he worked as a drawing teacher. In 1925, he received Estonian citizenship. For a few years, he was a teacher of theater decoration at the State Industrial Art School. His first appearance at an exhibition took place in St. Petersburg in the 1920s, and he also displayed his works at several exhibitions in Estonia and at the exhibition of Estonian art in Lübeck in 1929.

From 1924 to 1936, he designed the sets of the Russian Theatre in Tallinn and open-air sets for Paul Sepp, as well as the sets for the ballet studio of Eugenia Litvinova and Galina Chernyavskaya. In 1931, Root organized an exhibition of Russian art in the Great Guildhall on Pikk Street in Tallinn. In 1939, he founded a church museum near Alexander Nevsky Cathedral in Tallinn, gave lectures on Russian artists, and held exhibitions of their works. Root lived in Kuressaare during World War II, and he returned to Tallinn in 1945. Root joined the Estonian Soviet Artists Association in 1945.

== Filmography ==
- 1925: Tšeka komissar Miroštšenko (The Cheka Commissar Miroshchenko): set design
