= Ehin =

Ehin is a surname. Notable people with the surname include:

- Chuck Ehin (born 1961), American football player
- Kristiina Ehin (born 1977), Estonian singer, poet and translator
