= List of film production companies in Estonia =

This is the list of film production companies which are operating in Estonia. The list is incomplete.

Name	Headquarter	Year of establishing	Further info	Image
Allfilm		1995		
Apollo Film Productions		2017		
Eesti National Film		1924-1925	Films: Tšeka komissar Miroštšenko (1925), Mineviku varjud (1924), Õnnelik korterikriisi lahendus (1924)	
Eesti Telefilm				
Estonian Advertising Film				
Estonian Culture Film				
Exitfilm				
Hansafilm		2019		
Konstantin Märska Filmiproduktsioon		1929-1930		
Nafta Films		2009		
Regina-Film		1920s		
Silmviburlane		2006	Founded by Heilika ja Ülo Pikkov	
Suhkur Film		2000	Founded by Veiko Õunpuu. Notable films: "Agent Wild Duck" (2002).	
Taara-Film		1920s-1930s		
Tallinnfilm				
Taska Film				
Widescreen Productions		2011		
