= Kaljo Raag =

Estonian weightlifter (1892–1967)

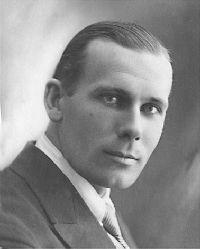

Personal information
- Born: 3 June 1892 Kirumpää, Estonia
- Died: 10 April 1967 (aged 74) Tallinn, then part of Estonian SSR, Soviet Union
- Weight: 100 kg (220 lb)

Sport
- Sport: Weightlifting
- Coached by: Alfred Neuland
Medal record
Representing Estonia
World Championships
Bronze medal – third place	1922 Tallinn	+82.5 kg

Kaljo-Feliks Raag (3 June 1892 – 10 April 1967) was an Estonian heavyweight weightlifter who won a bronze medal at the 1922 World Championships and placed seventh at the 1924 Summer Olympics. He won the national heavyweight title in 1925 and 1927 and set six national records.

After retiring from competitions, Raag acted as a weightlifting coach, referee and official. Besides wrestling, he was known as a singer and theater actor. He performed as an actor at the Valga theatre from 1919 until 1922 and as a choral singer and soloist at the Estonia Theatre from 1928 until 1933. He appeared in two Estonian silent films: Õnnelik korterikriisi lahendus (1924), directed by Konstantin Märska, and Tšeka komissar Miroštšenko (1925), directed by Paul Sehnert.
