= Jüri Rumm (film) =

1929 film

- Directed by: Johannes Loop
- Based on: Hans Varessoo's 1908 novel Jüri Rumm
- Produced by: Ida Jeršova
- Starring: Hans Suursööt; Ly Kerge; Boris Borissoff; Karl Laas; Mihkel Lepper; Benno Hansen; Salme Peetson; Elsa Silber; Meta Kelgo
- Cinematography: Konstantin Märska
- Distributed by: Konstantin Märska Filmproduktsioon
- Release date: December 11, 1929
- Running time: 102 minutes
- Country: Estonia
- Language: Estonian

Jüri Rumm is an Estonian feature-length film made in 1929 based on Hans Varessoo's 1908 novel of the same name. The film was directed by Johannes Loop.

== Plot ==
The film depicts the legendary adventures of the Estonian itinerant, thief, and robber Rummu Jüri, who became famous among people in Estonia in the 1880s. The story begins with the corporal punishment meted out to the manor's valet Jüri, which the proud and independent young man does not forgive the gentlemen for. The honor of his beloved Madli is also at stake at the manor, and in order to save her Jüri must risk imprisonment. However, as a skilled and daring man, he remains elusive. The story of the young lovers is intertwined with risky swindles at the expense of the gentry. Like an Estonian Robin Hood, Jüri takes revenge for the injustice done to the peasantry. The film features one of the most convincing fight scenes in Estonia's early film history.

== Cast ==
- Hans Suursööt as Jüri Rumm, the manor's valet
- Ly Kerge as Madli, the manor's maid, his bride
- Boris Borissoff as the baron, the manor owner
- Karl Laas as Mentus, the administrator of the manor
- Mihkel Lepper as the gendarmerie officer, a relative of the baron
- Benno Hansen as the trial judge
- Salme Peetson as the baroness from the neighboring manor
- Elsa Silber as the baroness's daughter
- Meta Kelgo as the baron's daughter
- Voldemar Toffer as the old valet
- Voldemar Päts as Pops
- Olga Holts as his wife
- Alfred Hindrea as Jüri Rumm's companion
- Richard Mildeberg as a soldier
- A. Kaasik as a soldier
