= Dolenčice =

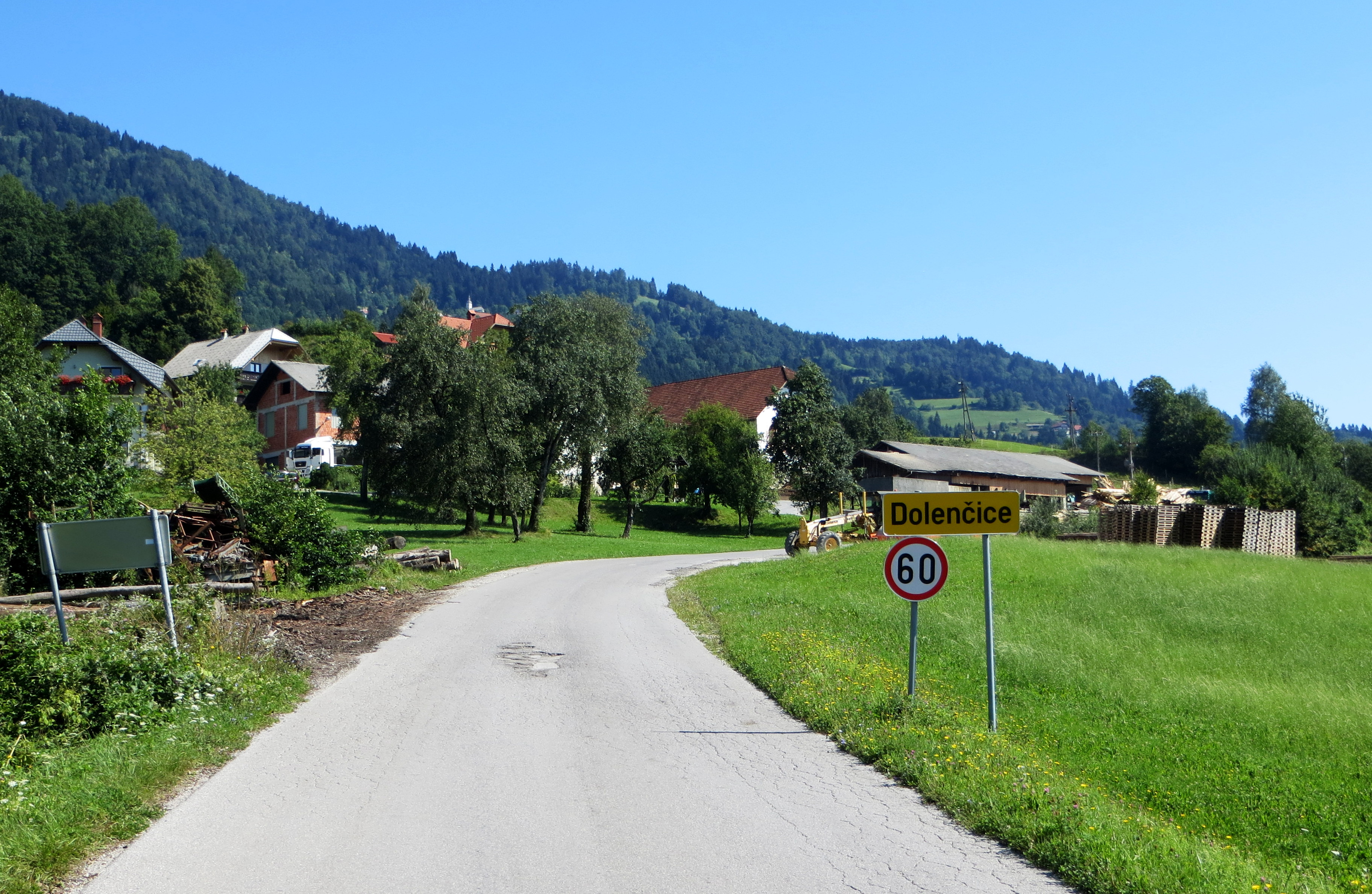

- Location in Slovenia
- Coordinates: 46°9′20.35″N 14°10′25.84″E
- Country: Slovenia
- Traditional region: Upper Carniola
- Statistical region: Upper Carniola
- Municipality: Gorenja Vas–Poljane

Area
  - Total: 2.46 km^{2} (0.95 sq mi)
- Elevation: 634.5 m (2,082 ft)

Population (2020)
  - Total: 89
  - Density: 36/km^{2} (94/sq mi)

Dolenčice (pronounced [dɔˈleːntʃitsɛ]; German: Dolentschize) is a small dispersed settlement north of Poljane in the Municipality of Gorenja Vas–Poljane in the Upper Carniola region of Slovenia.

== Notable people ==
Notable people that were born or lived in Dolenčice include:

- Ana Ažbe (1780–1850), Slovenian farmer and folk singer
- Anton Ažbe (1862–1905), painter
