= Pärnamäe Cemetery =

Cemetery in Tallinn, Estonia

Coordinates: 59°28′27″N 24°54′02″E

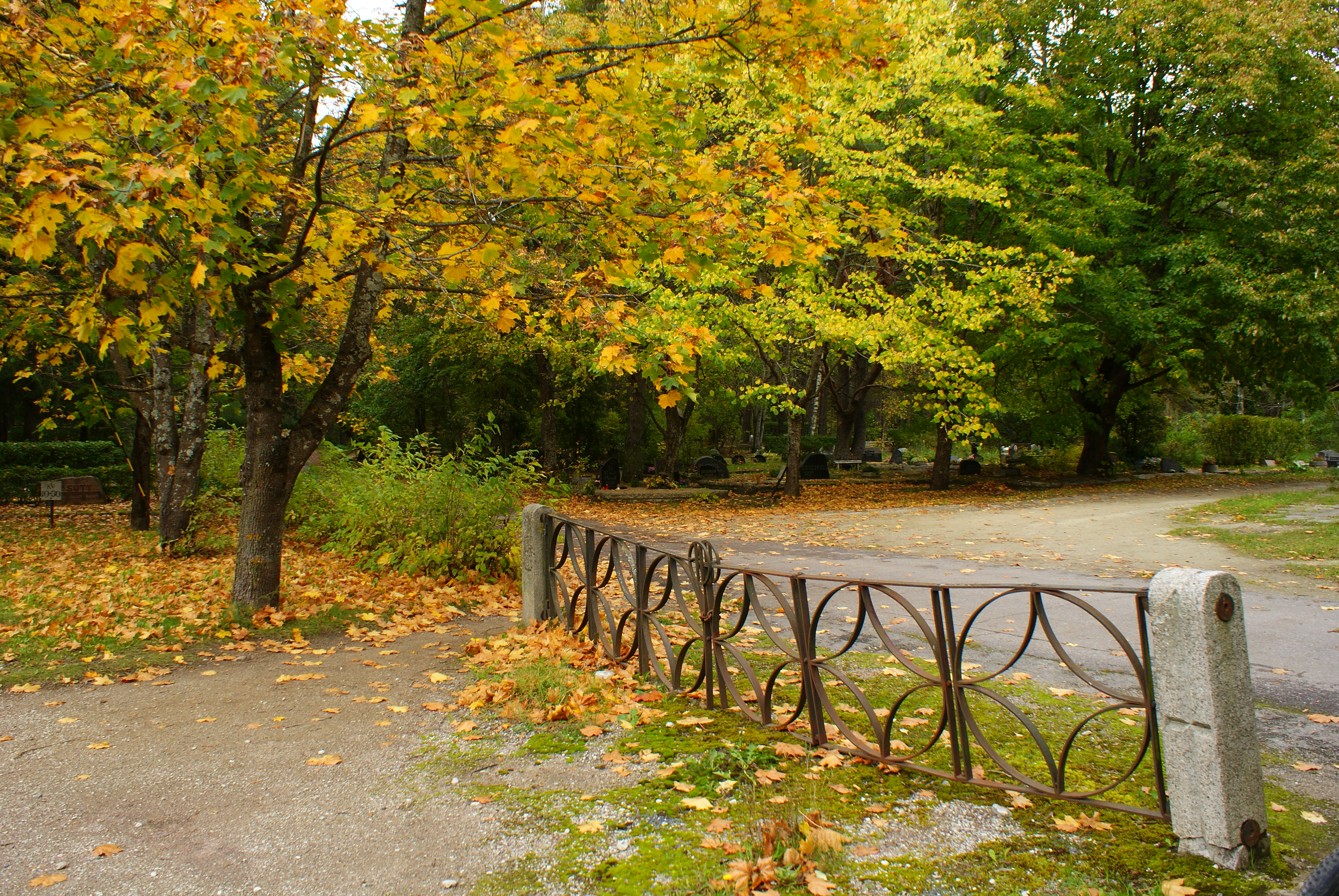
Pärnamäe Cemetery

Pärnamäe Cemetery (Estonian: Pärnamäe kalmistu) is a cemetery in Pirita District, Tallinn, Estonia. Its area is 105.6 ha.

The cemetery was opened in 1962, and the cemetery was the merger of two former cemeteries. The first burial took place in 1963.

In 1993, a crematorium (the first in Estonia) was opened at the cemetery.

== Burials ==
- Andres Ehin (1940–2011), writer and translator
- Boris Jaanikosk (1897–1976), film actor and film director
- Leida Laius (1923–1996), estonian film director
- Friedrich-Alfred Olbrei (1893–1972) scientist, broadcaster, and military engineer
- Semyon Semyonovich Shkolnikov (1918–2015), cinematographer, director, and screenwriter
- Jaak Simm (1943–1981), linguist
- Hannes Starkopf (1965–2021), sculptor
- Enn Toona (1909–1973), actor and director
- Konstantin Treffner (1885–1978), educator and politician
- Debora Vaarandi (1916–2007), writer
