= Ana Ažbe =

Slovenian farmer and folk singer (1780–1850)

- Born: Ana Ažbe; May 3, 1780; Dolenčice, Holy Roman Empire
- Died: January 5, 1850 (aged 69); Fara, Austrian Empire
- Occupations: farmer, folk singer

Ana Ažbe (3 May 1780 – 5 January 1850) was a Slovenian farmer and folk singer. She narrated and sang many folk songs so that they could be transcribed.

== Early life ==
Ana Ažbe was born on 3 May 1780 in Dolenčice on a large farm with a mill and an inn (locally known as pri Matečku). Her mother was the farmer Sholastika Jelovčan (1750–1826), and her father was the farmer and later mayor of Javorje, Janez Ažbe (1757–1826). She was the sixth of ten children, of whom, in addition to herself, two sisters and three brothers lived to adulthood. The painter Anton Ažbe was the grandson of one of her brothers. Two of her brothers became priests, as did two of her uncles.

The family estate employed many workers: maids, farmhands, drovers, shepherds, and herdswomen. The inn in her birthplace was a meeting point for locals, traders, traveling craftsmen, beggars, and musicians. While working there, Ana Ažbe heard many folk songs from itinerant singers and musicians. She was musically gifted, had an excellent memory, and quickly learned the songs.

== Work ==
On 11 February 1805, at the wish of her parents, she married a wealthy widowed farmer with children, Urban Žakelj (1759–1818) from Ledine. She moved to Ledine and became a farmer. The couple had seven children, three of whom survived childhood. Among them was Anton Žakelj (1816–1868), who later became a priest, collector of folk heritage, and poet under the pseudonym Rodoljub Ledinski. After fourteen years of marriage, her husband died. The farm was taken over by the children from his first marriage, and Ana Ažbe was no longer welcome there. She therefore quickly remarried, to the farmer Valentin Pagon, nine years her junior, and with her three surviving children moved with him to Dole. They had three children together. The marriage was unhappy due to her husband's drinking problem.

Ana Ažbe strongly wished for one of her sons to become a priest. She chose Anton for this path and sent him to school early. He attended primary school in Idrija, began secondary school in Ljubljana in 1829, continued in Karlovac in 1830, and finished in Novo Mesto. Her priest brothers helped her support his education.

=== Folk songs ===
She sang throughout her life. Some of the songs she sang were written down by her son Anton while still a student in Ljubljana. As a nationally conscious supporter of Illyrianism, he recognized their value. He transcribed his mother's singing directly into a notebook, later editing the spelling, marking accents, dividing the text into stanzas, and rewriting it neatly. Following the literary fashion of the time, he sometimes modified the songs, adding verses and altering the rhythm.

He continued this work for years, filling at least seven notebooks, of which only one survives, and it is incomplete. He titled it Narodne kranjske pesmi (zapisane v Doleh 26. velkiga serpana 1838. Ant. Žakelj) (Carniolan Folk Songs, Recorded in Dole, 26 August 1838. Ant. Žakelj). The first of Ažbe's folk songs he recorded were published in the fifth and final volume of Krajnska čbelica in 1848.

Another notebook of folk songs was once kept at the former Our Lady's Orphanage and School (Slovene: Marijanišče). From it, Jakob Šilc published the original version of the song "Mlada Breda" (Young Breda) in the journal Dom in svet in 1913. He was the last person known to have seen the notebook, which later disappeared.

The best-known ballads and romances recorded by her son from her singing include "Zvesta deklica," "Marija na svetih Vošarjih," "Marija z Jelenta," "Mlada Mojca," "Mlada Breda," "Mlada Zora," "Zidar v Ljubnim," "Cigan," and "Alenčica."

== Later life and death ==
As she neared seventy, her health declined and she was no longer able to work. In the spring of 1849, she moved to live with her son Anton, who was then serving as a curate in Bloke. She died there on 5 January 1850 after a brief illness of only three days. She was buried in Bloke.
