= Voldemar Päts (cinematographer) =

Estonian cinematographer and actor (1902–1942)

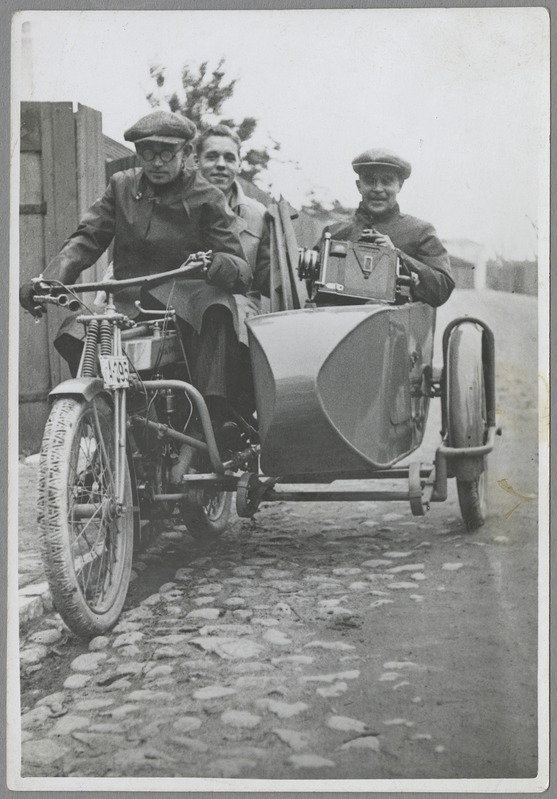
- August Eljari and Voldemar Päts (in the sidecar)
- Born: Vladimir Päts; February 15, 1902; Tänassilma, Governorate of Livonia, Russian Empire
- Died: September 1942 (age 40)
- Resting place: Alexander Nevsky Cemetery, Tallinn
- Occupations: Cinematographer and actor

Voldemar Päts (born Vladimir Päts; February 15, 1902 – September 1942) was an Estonian cinematographer and actor.

== Early life and family ==
Voldemar Päts was born Vladimir Päts in Tänassilma, in the Governorate of Livonia of the Russian Empire (now Estonia), the son of the Estonian Orthodox priest Nikolai Päts (1871–1940) and Ludmilla Päts (née Tšistjakova, 1879–1955). He was the nephew of the Estonian statesman Konstantin Päts (1874–1956), the artist Voldemar Päts (1878–1958), and the geographer Peeter Päts (1880–1942).

== Career ==
In 1931, Päts collaborated with Elmar Jaanimägi to create the first Estonian animated film, Kutsu-Juku seiklusi (The Adventures of Juku the Dog).

During a visit to Estonia by Sweden's Crown Prince Gustaf Adolf in 1932, the head of state Jaan Teemant forbade filming, and Päts was sentenced to two weeks of arrest or a fine of 10 kroons.

Päts died in September 1942 and is buried at Alexander Nevsky Cemetery in Tallinn.

== Filmography ==
- 1924: Mineviku varjud as Tuuletark (credited as Voldemar Step)
- 1927: Kevade unelm, director, screenwriter, supporting role as a construction engineer
- 1929: Dollarid, director's assistant
- 1929: Jüri Rumm as Pops
- 1931: Kutsu-Juku seiklusi, cameraman, writer, director
