= Elsa Silber =

Estonian film actress

Elsa Silber (also Ella Silber) was an Estonian silent film actress.

== Filmography ==
- 1924: Mineviku varjud as Virve, Olev's daughter
- 1925: Tšeka komissar Miroštšenko
- 1927: Kevade unelm as Hilma Aamisep, an upstart's daughter
- 1929: Jüri Rumm as Jüri Rumm's daughter
