= Karl Laas (actor) =

Estonian actor (1892–?)

- Born: April 9, 1892; Tartu, Estonia
- Died: Unknown
- Occupation: Actor
- Spouse: Paula Cäcilie Marie Laas
- Parents: Hendrik Laas (father); Marie Johanna Laas (mother)

Karl Heinrich Laas (a.k.a. Charles Laas; April 9, 1892 – ?) was an Estonian actor.

== Early life ==
Laas was born in Tartu on April 9, 1892. His father was the agriculturalist and journalist Hendrik Laas (1862–1919), who was the publisher of Põllumees, the first Estonian agricultural magazine, offered agricultural courses, and owned an experimental farm. His mother was Marie Johanna Laas (née Leib, 1863–1919). Laas attended the University of Tartu, Riga Polytechnical Institute, and Nikolaevsky Engineering Academy.

During the First World War, Laas was an officer in the Siberian sapper regiment, and he received six Russian and French medals of honor for bravery. He was the only Estonian member of the Imperial All-Russian Aero Club. During the Estonian War of Independence, Laas served in the government and the air force.

== Acting career ==
Laas was a leading actor in Estonian films in the interwar period, appearing in seven major Estonian films.

== Later career ==
In the 1930s, Laas was the assistant manager of Ülemiste Airport and also worked as its meteorological station manager. He held the rank of reserve captain.

== Family ==
Laas married Paula Cäcilie Marie Michelson (1898–1960) in 1920.

== Filmography ==
- 1929: Jüri Rumm as Mentus, the administrator of the manor
- 1929: Vigased pruudid as Enn, a suitor from Mulgimaa
- 1930: Kuldämblik as a musician
- 1930: Pühapäevakütid as the teacher
- 1931: Öösel as the judge
