= Johannes Loop =

Estonian film director

Johannes Loop (also John Loop) was an Estonian film director.

== Filmography ==
- 1924: Mineviku varjud (feature film; assistant director)
- 1929: Jüri Rumm (feature film; director)
- 1929: Vigased pruudid (feature film; director)
