= Hendrik Saar =

Estonian journalist, caricaturist, playwright, and clown (1893–1944)

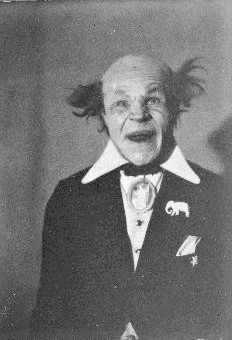
- Hendrik Saar as a clown at the Arena circus
- Born: March 7, 1893; Laatre, Estonia
- Died: 1944 (aged 49–50)
- Occupations: Journalist, caricaturist, playwright, and clown

Hendrik Saar (pseudonyms Kivilombi Ints and Sulgnokk; March 8, 1893 – 1944) was an Estonian journalist, caricaturist, playwright, and clown.

== Early life ==
Saar was born in Laatre parish in the Põhja-Ruhja district of Valmiera County. He was the son of Villem Saar (1850–?) and Ann Saar (née Ilves, 1865–1954).

== Career ==
In addition to working as a journalist, cartoonist, playwright, and clown, Saar also performed as a cathedral singer and stage actor. He translated operetta texts and theater jokes, and he staged his own plays. In 1919, together with Gori, he started publishing the humor magazine Sipelgas. He also served as the editor of several other humor magazines in Tallinn—Vana Meie Mats (1919), Meie Mats (1920–1921), Kodanik Mats (1920s), and Naljaleht (1929–1930)—and of the film magazine Kino-Film (1927–1928) and the erotic magazine Nauding (1931). In addition, he published six issues (which were confiscated) of the serialized novel Tallinna saladused (Tallinn Secrets, 1926–1927) and continued from February 1927 with the title Uued Tallinna saladused (New Tallinn Secrets), which was published in 18 issues.

Because Saar was not accepted as an actor in other theaters, he created his miniature theater Illusioon to parody "real art." In 1930, he had a supporting role in the film Kuldämblik (The Golden Spider), in which he played a musician.

== Arrest and disappearance ==
After the outbreak of German–Soviet War in 1941, Saar published a column about Adolf Hitler in the newspaper Sirp ja Vasar. Presumably because of the accompanying cartoons, he was arrested in 1942 by the German occupation authorities. He was last seen cleaning the streets of Tallinn in the spring and summer of 1944 in a labor column of prisoners.

== Works ==
- 1918: Nurjaläinud äpardus (Misadventure Averted)
- 1918: Käbid torbiku sees (Cones in a Cone)
- 1918–1924: Punktimehed (Point Men)
- 1919: Ha-ha-ha!
- 1919: Kui kaks nii ühte nägu on... : naljamäng kahes vaatuses (If Two Faces Are the Same...: A Comedy in Two Acts)
- 1921: Otsekohesus (Frankness)
- 1922: Nõialind ja hea poiss Juku (The Witch Bird and the Good Boy Juku)
- 1922: Riigivaras (The Thief of the State)
- 1922: Imesõrmus ja vaene laps Anni (The Miracle Ring and Poor Child Anni)
- 1922: Kolmikliit (The Triple Alliance; illustrations by Gori and verses by Hendrik Saar)
- 1923: Ahvi tütar. Juhtumised maal ja üksikul saarekesel (The Monkey's Daughter. Incidents in the Country and on a Lonely Isle)
- 1923: Paremad kupleed (Better Couplets)
- 1923: Kergats (The Fop)
- 1923: Elli langemine. Jutustus Tallinna elust (The Fall of Elli. A Story about Life in Tallinn)
- 1924: Pöörang (The Revolution)
- 1924: Abielumeeste kavalused (Wives of Husbands)
- 1924: Pleki-Karla kosjakäigud (The Courtships of Pleki-Karla; operetta)
- 1925: Kah kaarditark (Also a Fortune Teller)
- 1925: Kommunistid korteris (Communists in an Apartment)
- 1925: Sangaste Juss (Juss of Sangaste)
- 1925: Viina pärast (After Vodka)
- 1926–1927: Tallinna saladused (Secrets of Tallinn; 1–6, December 1926 – January 1927, confiscated; in February 1927 published under the new title Uued Tallinna saladused, New Secrets of Tallinn)
- 1927: Lõbunaisterahva romaan. Tallinna juhtumisi (A Novel by a Funny Woman. Incidents in Tallinn)
- 1927: Jõulu-album 1927 (Christmas Album 1927; verses by Hendrik Saar)
- 1933: Pruut ja lehm (The Bride and the Cow)
- 1941: "Misajast Hitler on hull?" (Since When Is Hitler Crazy?), Sirp ja Vasar 27 (July 24), page 5

== Family ==
Hendrik Saar was married to Roosi Saar (1897–1926), who left him and then committed suicide in Dakar after being imprisoned for murder. Their daughter was the ballet dancer Asta Saar (1920–2000). She was married to the baritone Georg Ots from 1944 to 1964.
