= Andres Ehin =

Estonian writer and translator

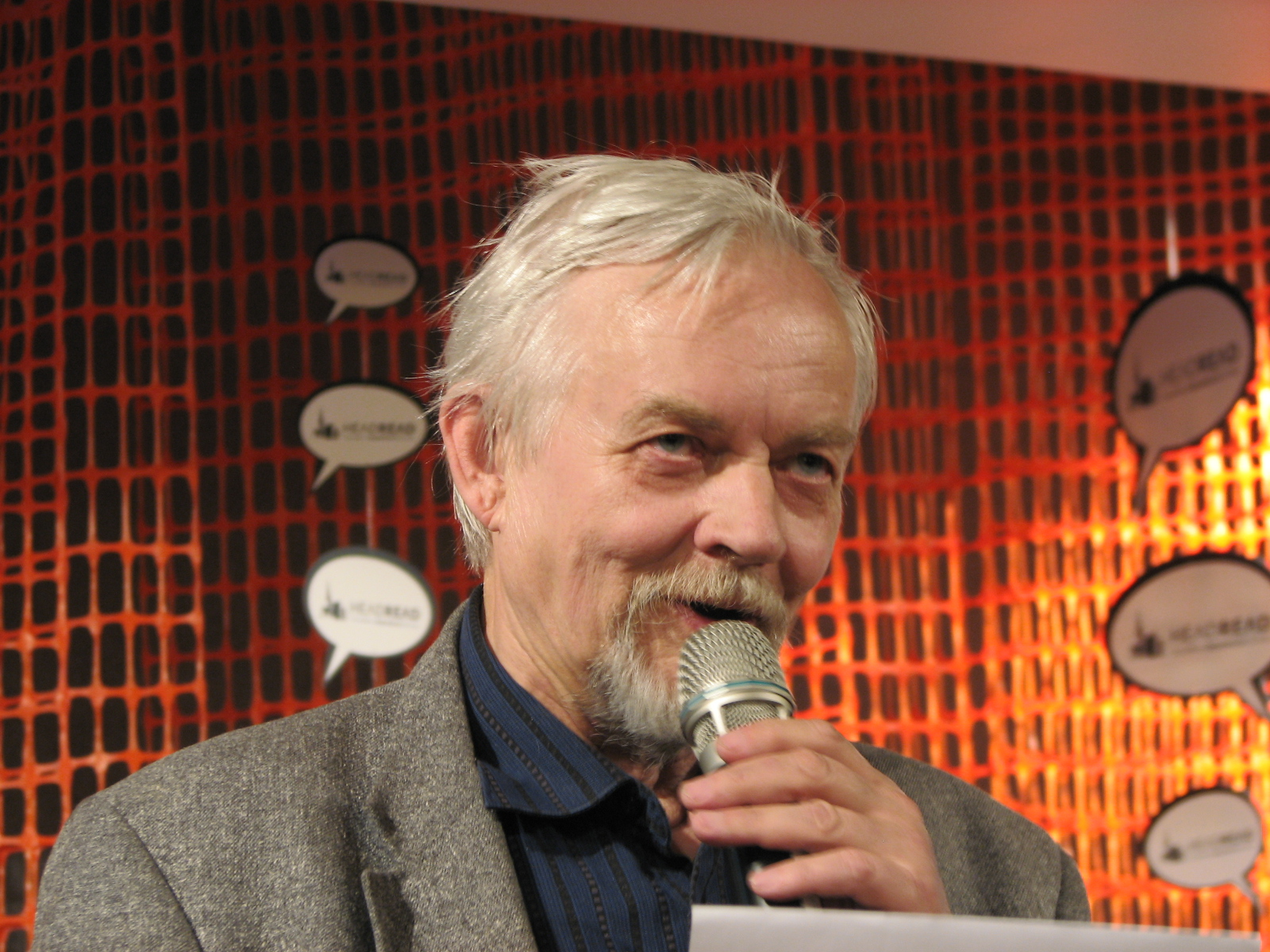
Andres Ehin performing in literature festival HeadRead

Andres Ehin (14 March 1940 – 10 December 2011) was an Estonian writer and translator. In 1964 he graduated from University of Tartu, studying Estonian philology (especially Finno-Ugric studies). From 1972 to 1974 he was the senior scientific editor of Estonian Soviet Encyclopaedia. From 1972 he was a member of Estonian Writers' Union. From 1968 to 1989 he was a member of Communist Party. In 1990 he joined Estonian Social Democratic Party.

He married Ly Seppel (Ehin). Their daughters are the political scientist [Piret Ehin] and the poet Kristiina Ehin.

He died in 2011 and was buried in Pärnamäe Cemetery in Tallinn.

== Works ==
- 1995: poetry collection Teadvus on ussinahk (Consciousness is Snakeskin)
- 2000: poetry collection Alateadvus on alatasa purjus (The Unconscious is Frequently Drunk)
- 1996: novel Rummu Jüri mälestused (The Memoirs of Rummu Jüri)
