= Vigased pruudid =

1929 film

- Directed by: Johannes Loop; Konstantin Märska
- Based on: Eduard Vilde's story "Vigased pruudid"
- Starring: Samuel Siirak; Ly Schönberg; Margareta Müller; Joosep Koppel; E. Pessin; Karl Laas; Georg Leies
- Cinematography: Konstantin Märska
- Distributed by: Konstantin Märska Filmproduktsioon
- Release date: September 26, 1929
- Country: Estonia
- Language: Estonian

Vigased pruudid (English: Handicapped Brides) is an Estonian feature-length comedy film made in 1929, based on Eduard Vilde's story of the same name. The film was directed by Johannes Loop and Konstantin Märska. A few minutes of excerpts from the film have been preserved.

== Background and history ==
Vigased prudid was the first film based on an Estonian literary work and also the second feature film by the director Konstantin Märska. In the summer of 1928, Märska returned to his homeland from Berlin with years of experience in film work. On February 11, 1929, the newspaper Esmaspäev wrote about the intention of the Film-Klub (a club of film enthusiasts founded in 1924) to make a film based on Vilde's story. The writer's consent had been obtained and the club members had learned some things, but, as usual, the financial situation created difficulties. It is not known exactly how Märska, who was initially only invited as a cameraman by the Film-Klub, resolved this issue, but on August 24, 1929, the newspaper Rahwaleht already gave an overview of the film's production process, mentioning, among other things, that the exterior shots were filmed on a farm near Saku.

Vigased prudid was premiered at the Rekord cinema in Tallinn to a "small circle of cinema enthusiasts" on September 26, 1929, and it was shown for 11 days in a row. The audience liked the film, and already in January and February 1930 it was screened again in Tallinn, and it ran for five consecutive days at the Skala cinema and eight at the Kungla cinema.

== Plot ==
The owner of the Lipuvere farm wants to marry his daughters Leena and Miina to rich nephews from Mulgimaa, but the hearts of the girls lie instead with other young men, with whom they now have to come up with a cunning plan to get rid of the annoying Mulgimaa suitors.

== Cast ==
- Samuel Siirak as Mart Pajuvits, the owner of the Lipuvere farm
- Ly Schönberg as Leena, his daughter
- Margareta Müller as Miina, his daughter
- Joosep Koppel as Joosep, a servant at Lipuvere
- E. Pessin as Kärje Juhan, the neighbor's son
- Karl Laas as Enn, a suitor from Mulgimaa
- Georg Leies as Jaak, a suitor from Mulgimaa
- E. Mendt as the miller
