= Kuldämblik =

1930 film

- Directed by: Boris Jaanikosk
- Written by: Hendrik Saar
- Produced by: Konstantin Märska
- Starring: Olga Torokoff-Tiedeberg; Aleksander Arder; Ly Schönberg; Georg Leies; E. Pessin
- Cinematography: Konstantin Märska
- Distributed by: Konstantin Märska Filmproduktsioon
- Release date: March 16, 1930
- Country: Estonia
- Language: Estonian

Kuldämblik (English: Gold Spider) is a 1930 Estonian musical film directed by Boris Jaanikosk and produced by Konstantin Märska, who was also the cinematographer. The screenplay was written by Hendrik Saar under the pseudonym Kivilombi Ints.

Kuldämblik was Estonia's first film with recorded sound. Speech and singing for the film were recorded on 78 rpm records that could be played in the cinema. Olga Torokoff-Tiedeberg and Aleksander Arder sing in the film.

The bar scenes, which make up the main part of the plot, as well as the advertising for alcohol and tobacco consumption, caused the conservative Estonian Ministry of Education to take action. The film received a warning from the authorities that it was not suitable for young people. The ban on viewers under 16 years of age deterred many cinema owners from including the film in their programs.

The short film premiered on March 16, 1930. However, it did not meet the technical and financial expectations placed on it. The film is considered lost.

== Cast ==
- Olga Torokoff-Tiedeberg as Olli the flower seller
- Aleksander Arder as Captain Parm
- Ly Schönberg
- Georg Leies
- E. Pessin
- Karl Laas as a musician
- Hendrik Saar as a musician
- Priit Veebel as a musician
- Aino Uiga
- Evi Konsa
- Paul Kuusik
- Rene Banorinjev
- Karin Banorinjev
