= Harry Egipt =

Estonian director of Soviet TV commercials

- Born: Harry Laast; May 15, 1950 (age 76); Tallinn, Estonia
- Occupation: television advert director

Harry Egipt (born Harry Laast; 15 May 1950) is an Estonian cinematographer and director of television advertisements. He worked for Eesti Reklaamfilm from 1979 to 1989.

== Early life and career ==
Born in Tallinn, he attended Tallinn 10th Secondary School, graduating in 1968, and then studied history at University of Tartu. After graduating in 1972, he worked as a light technician and subsequently a cameraman for the Estonian state broadcaster, Eesti Televisioon.

=== Advertising career ===
Egipt joined Eesti Reklaamfilm in 1979, and became known for producing famous commercials, many of which were surreal and eccentric, inspired by Western television commercials which could be seen from Estonia on Finnish television. Products would be advertised as and when products were in stock, serving to inform about local availability. He left Eesti Reklaamfilm in 1989, and the company later closed down in 1991.

=== Later career ===
Egipt now lives in Tallinn, working as a police officer and an interpreter.
