= Hendrik Laas =

Estonian agriculturalist and publisher (1862–1919)

- Born: July 29, 1862; Võtikvere parish, Estonia
- Died: March 13, 1919 (aged 56); Tartu, Estonia
- Occupation(s): Agriculturalist, publisher
- Children: Karl Laas

Hendrik Laas (July 29, 1862 – March 13, 1919) was an Estonian agriculturalist and publisher.

== Career ==
Hendrik Laas was born in the former Võtikvere parish. He was the owner of a bookstore, library, and seed and agricultural tool store in Tartu, and he owned an experimental farm in Raadi with a garden, an apiary, and fish ponds. He organized agricultural courses, exhibitions, and excursions.

Laas published the magazine Põllumees (The Farmer) from 1895 to 1912, Põllumehe kalendrit (The Farmer's Almanac) from 1895 to 1904, and the weekly newspaper Vabadus from 1906 to 1909, and he also published agricultural educational literature.

Laas died in Tartu in 1919.

== Awards and recognitions ==
Hendrik Laas received the Order of Saint Anna and Order of Saint Stanislaus, and he was promoted to honorary citizen in 1909. He was a member of the Society of Estonian Literati.

== Family ==
Hendrik Laas married Marie Johanna Leib (1863–1919). Their son was the actor Karl Laas.

== Works ==
- 1891: Juhatus lina-harimiseks (Guide to Flax Cultivation). Tartu: Tartu Eesti Põllumeeste Selts
- 1895: "Rukki seemnest ja külvist" (Rye Seed and Sowing), in Põllumehe Kalender 1
- 1898: Sulgloomade kasvatus (Poultry Farming)
- 1898: Kalakasvatuse õpetus (Guide to Fish Farming)
- 1902: Põlluasjanduse kursused (Courses in Agricultural Science)
- 1907: Mesilane ja tema elu (The Bee and Its Life)
- 1907: Meerikkad taimed ja nende kasvatamine (Sea Plants and Their Cultivation)
