= Salme Peetson =

Estonian actress (1885–1967)

- Born: April 29, 1885; Narva, Estonia
- Died: August 31, 1967 (aged 82); Tallinn, then part of Estonian SSR, Soviet Union
- Occupation: Actress

Salme Peetson (April 29, 1885 – August 31, 1967) was an Estonian actress.

== Early life and education ==
Salme Peetson was born in Narva, Estonia. She was the daughter of Jaan Peetson (1858–1936) and Louise Marie Peetson (née Holm; 1858–1932), who were workers at the Kreenholm Manufacturing Company. She graduated from the Kreenholm factory school in 1899 and initially worked as a weaver and hatmaker.

== Career ==
Starting in 1900, she appeared in performances by the theater group of the Estonian temperance society Võitleja. She was an operetta and stage actress at the Estonian Theater from 1909 to 1937, in 1941, and again from 1943 to 1944, and she also sang in the choir. She appeared in two films in 1929. From 1945 to 1959, she was the manager of the Estonia Theater's costume warehouse.

== Filmography ==
- 1929: Dollarid as the first middle-aged woman
- 1929: Jüri Rumm as the baroness from the neighboring manor
