= Anton Ažbe =

Slovene painter (1862–1905)

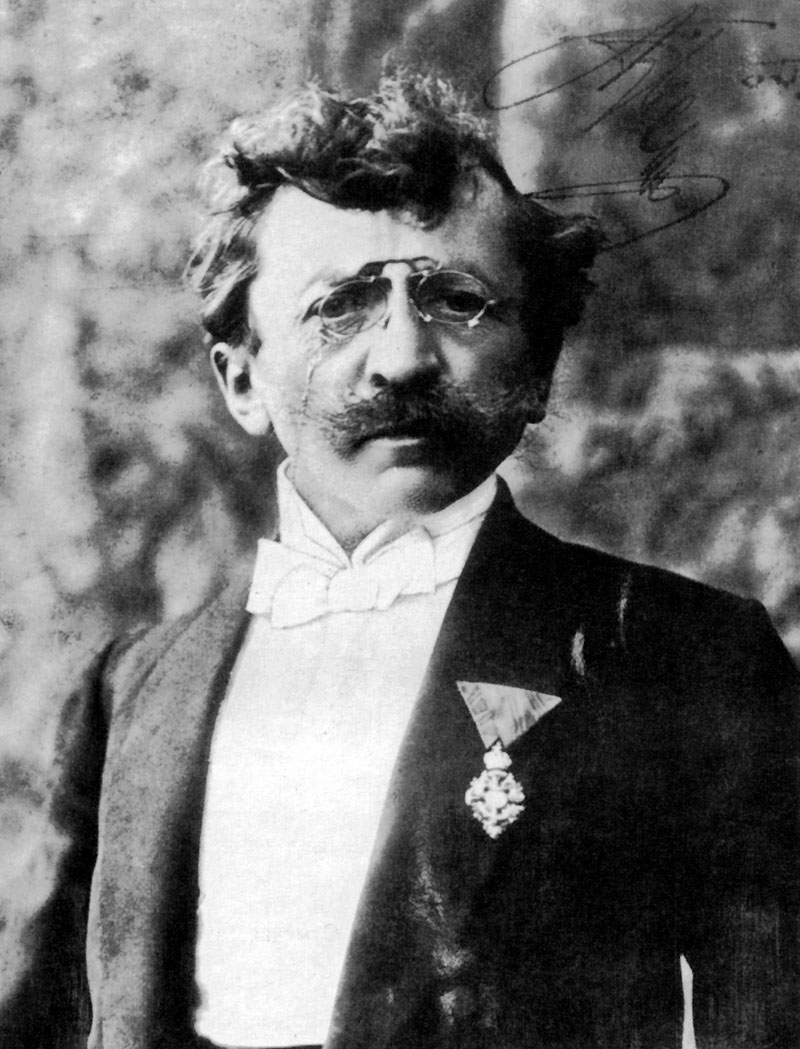
Anton Ažbe, 1904 photograph

Anton Ažbe (30 May 1862 – 5 or 6 August 1905) was a Slovene painter and art teacher during the Belle Époque. Ažbe, crippled since birth and orphaned at the age of eight, learned painting as an apprentice to Janez Wolf and at the Academies in Vienna and Munich. At the age of 30, Ažbe founded his own school of painting in Munich that became a popular attraction for Eastern European students. Ažbe trained the "big four" Slovenian impressionists (Rihard Jakopič, Ivan Grohar, Matej Sternen, Matija Jama), a whole generation of Russian painters (Ivan Bilibin, Mstislav Dobuzhinsky, Igor Grabar, Wassily Kandinsky, Dmitry Kardovsky and Kuzma Petrov-Vodkin, to name a few), Serbian painters Nadežda Petrović, Beta Vukanović, Ljubomir Ivanović, Borivoje Stevanović, Kosta Miličević, and Milan Milovanović, the Hungarian painter Sándor Ziffer or a Czech painter Ludvik Kuba.

Ažbe's training methods were adopted by Beta and Rista Vukanović when they took over Kiril Kutlik's atelier and school and by Russian artists both at home (Grabar, Kardovsky) and in emigration (Bilibin, Dobuzhinsky).

Ažbe's own undisputed artistic legacy is limited to twenty-six graphic works, including classroom studies, most of them at the National Gallery of Slovenia. His long-planned masterpieces never materialized and, according to Peter Selz, he "never came into his own as an artist". His enigmatic personality blended together alcoholism, chain smoking, bitter loneliness, minimalistic simple living in private, and eccentric behaviour in public. A public scarecrow and a bohemian socialite, Ažbe protected his personal secrets till the end, a mystery even to his students and fellow teachers. The public transformed the circumstances of his untimely death from cancer into an urban legend.

== Biography ==
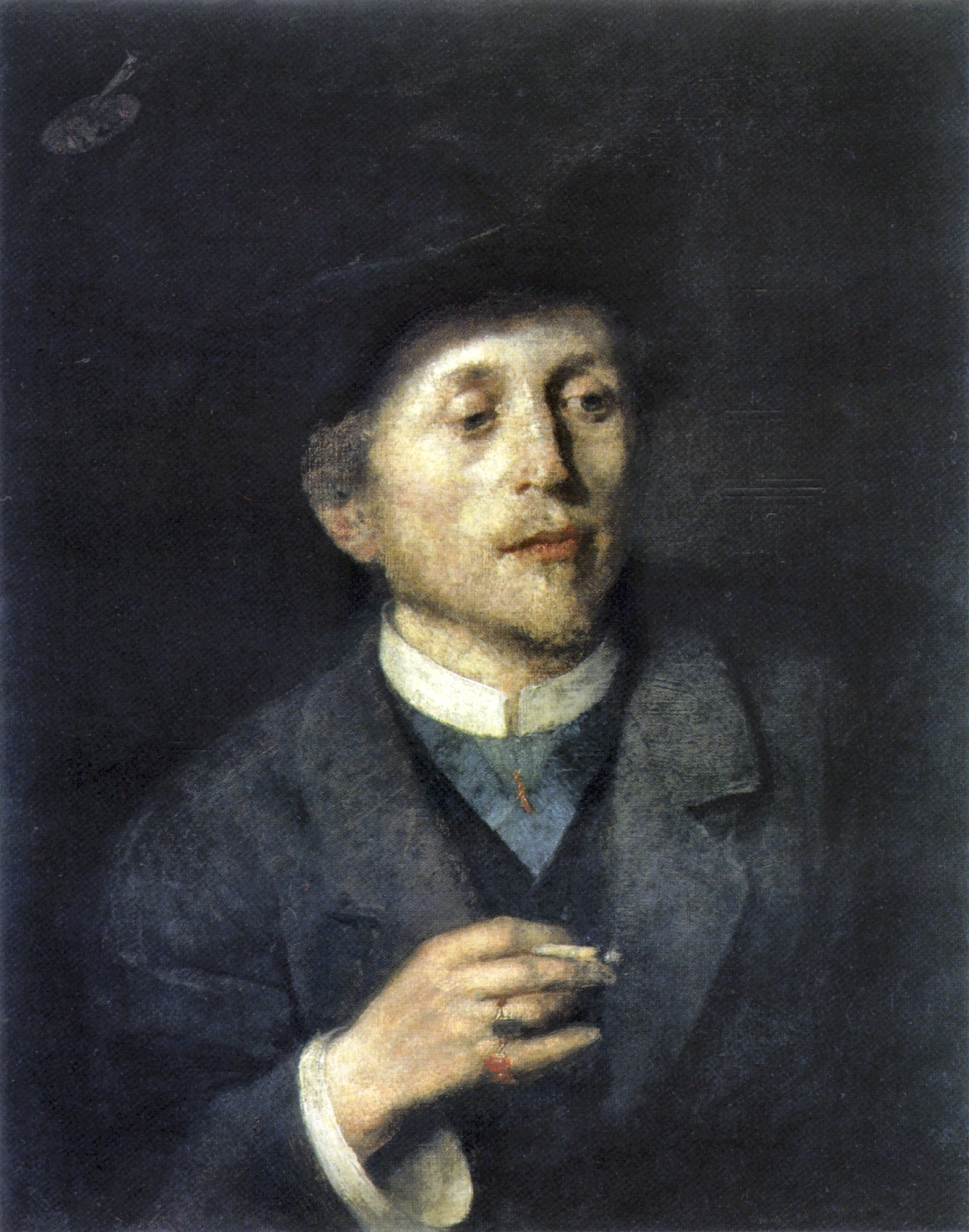
Self-portrait, c. 1886

Twins Alois and Anton Ažbe were born in a peasant family in the Carniolan village of Dolenčice near Škofja Loka in the Austrian Empire (now in Slovenia). Their father's paternal aunt was Ana Ažbe (1780–1850), Slovenian farmer and folk singer. Their father died of familial tuberculosis at the age of forty when the boys were seven years old. Their mother lapsed into severe mental distress (there is unreliable evidence that she later committed suicide) and the boys were placed into foster care. By this time, it was evident that while Alois developed normally, Anton suffered serious congenital health problems: he lagged in physical growth, his legs were weak, and his spine was deformed. His legal guardian reasoned that Anton was not fit for farm work; after completing an elementary school, he sent Anton to "study commerce" in Klagenfurt.

After five years of living and working at a grocery store, Ažbe ran away from Klagenfurt to Ljubljana. At some point in the late 1870s, he met Janez Wolf, a Slovenian painter associated with the Nazarene movement who handled numerous church mural commissions. Little is known about Ažbe's experience with Wolf, apart from the facts that in 1880, Ažbe assisted Wolf with the frescoes of the Zagorje ob Savi church and, in 1882, with the facade of the Franciscan Church of the Annunciation in Ljubljana.

In the same year, Wolf helped Ažbe with admission to the Academy of Fine Arts in Vienna, where Anton studied for two years. He was dissatisfied with outdated, uninspiring Viennese training and barely made passing grades. In 1884, he relocated to the Academy of Fine Arts in Munich, then a "liberal" and "modern" school as opposed to the conservative Viennese Academy. There, he made a superb impression on his teachers, Gabriel Hackl and Ludwig von Löfftz, and earned a free scholarship. To make a living, Ažbe teamed up with Ferdo Vesel, selling classroom works and run-of-the-mill kitsch scenes to wholesale dealers. Half of Ažbe's surviving legacy dates back to the Munich Academy years; by the end of this period, he was recognized as a professional portrait painter and was regularly exhibited in the Glaspalast.

Wolf died in bitter poverty in 1884; later, Ažbe frequently spoke that shortly before death (rendered by Ažbe in chilling detail), Wolf dictated to him his last will – that he, Ažbe, must train a successor of Wolf's art, an ethnic Slovene who would surpass his seniors and strike the world with his genius. The free-of-charge training should last no less than eight years. For this purpose, said Ažbe, Wolf entrusted Ažbe with the "secret" of his art. It is not clear how much of the "Wolf's myth" is real; the "great Slovene painter" did not emerge, and Ažbe complained that all Slovene students, apart from faithful Matej Sternen, were leaving the school too early, preferring absolute freedom to the benefits of professional training.

In 1892, Vesel and Rihard Jakopič offered Ažbe the informal job of examining and correcting the students' paintings. The seven clients rented a study room and paid Ažbe for fixing their homework. Two months later, an inflow of new clients allowed Ažbe to rent his own premises, thus starting the Ažbe School. After a brief stay on Türkenstrasse, the school relocated to its permanent base at 16, Georgenstrasse in Schwabing (the building was destroyed by an allied air raid in July 1944). Later, Ažbe rented another building for the school classes and moved into his private workshop (also in Georgenstrasse).

The school was never short of students, with a normal complement reaching 80. The total number of Ažbe alumni stands at around 150. Some, notably Alexej von Jawlensky, Matej Sternen, and Marianne von Werefkin, attended the school for nearly a decade. Ažbe remained the sole instructor, except for a brief period in 1899–1900 when he hired Igor Grabar as an assistant. Long-established competitors, the Munich Academy and the Imperial Academy of Arts in Saint Petersburg, recognized the Ažbe School and recommended it as a preparatory, or "refreshment", course.

In 1904, Ažbe, a lifelong smoker, developed throat cancer and by the spring of 1905, he could hardly swallow food. Matej Sternen noted that the feeling of near death was obvious to all witnesses. Ažbe agreed to a surgery that passed without immediate complications, but on 5 or 6 August 1905, Ažbe died.

The public had transformed a sad but ordinary and expected event into a melodramatic urban legend. Leonhard Frank, who studied with Ažbe in 1904, reproduced the legend in Links, wo das Herz ist (1952): "Nobody ever saw his paintings. Nobody knew if he ever painted at all. Nobody knew his past. One chilly December night, intoxicated with cognac, he fell asleep in the snow. He was found dead in the morning. Nobody knew where he had come from." A similar story was retold by Mikhail Shemyakin.

The school of Anton Ažbe survived its founder and existed until the onset of World War I.

== Personality ==
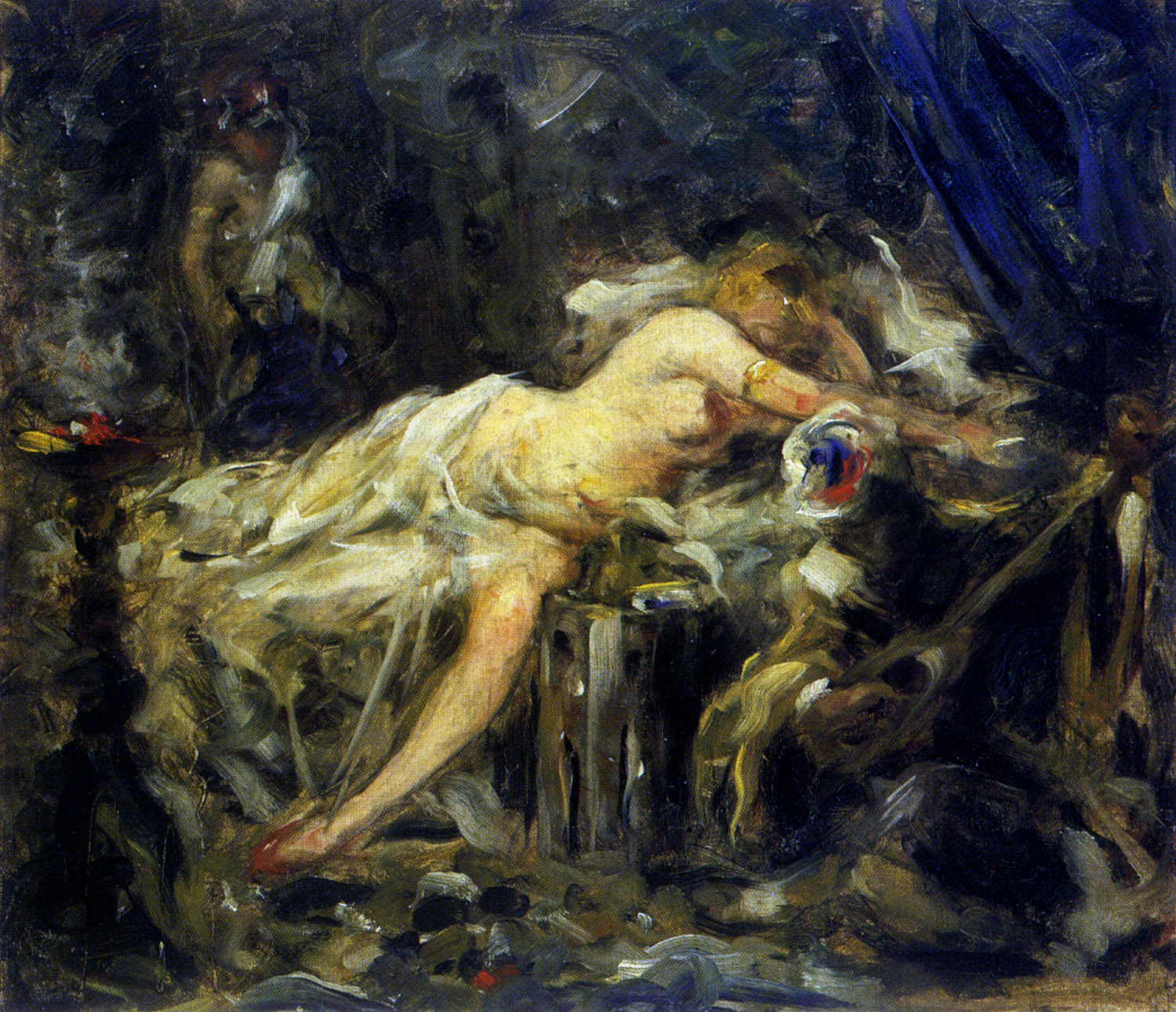
The Harem, the last known work by Ažbe. His magnum opus Odalisque has been lost (its existence attested by a single photograph made in 1902).

Modern understanding of Ažbe's personality is based on the interpretation of biased and conflicting statements made by his alumni. Ažbe never wrote for the public and never attempted to formulate his own teaching methods on paper. His letters to Alois were destroyed according to the family's will; the rest of his archive contained only business papers. The only evidence of Ažbe's own handwriting is limited to three postcards and a letter to Sternen.

It is not known if Ažbe ever had a personal life; he himself mentioned that he was engaged twice, and both marriage attempts failed. There was some bond between him and Kathi Kobus, owner of the Simpli pub, but they both took the secret of this relationship to their graves. According to Sternen, he was consumed by a mysterious personality split that drove him into binge drinking and slovenly appearance. Likewise, Kandinsky wrote that Ažbe's apparently unremarkable life was itself a mystery.

Physically, Ažbe was not a dwarf but still a man of a very short and irregular stature. Niko Zupanič described him as having unusually short and weak legs, with a twisted upper spine. His head combined a large cranium with a disproportionately narrow face. Igor Grabar noted that his wide forehead was covered with a web of red pulsing veins; the rest of the face was uniformly red, as if in a fever; at the age of 33 Ažbe seemed to be at least forty years old. He groomed his long chestnut moustache to the style of Wilhelm II. He always wore black, and of the best make; in winter his attire was complete with a tall oriental karakul hat.

The oddly shaped and expensively (if not tastelessly) dressed schoolmaster, slowly walking with a cane and always smoking, became a target of tabloids and cartoonists. Boys taunted him on the streets, shouting "Atzpe! Atzpe!" (incorrectly pronouncing Slovenian Ažbe in German). Ažbe's own German was not perfect either; he, particularly, abused the word nähmlich ("namely", "that is...") and was called "Professor Nähmlich". He normally spoke German in Munich but used Slovenian in a Slavic company.

Ažbe never had a proper home, sleeping on an untidy sofa in a workshop filled with his students' paintings. He always painted in his studio and never ventured into open-air painting. Ažbe frequently spoke of his planned future masterpieces, none of which moved past the sketch stage. He left Munich only once, visiting Venice in 1897; otherwise, his life revolved between the school and local pubs. Their owners regularly allowed a drunken Ažbe to sleep on their premises. With age he became more and more sedentary and replaced his daily walkouts with a circle ride on a tram.

Ažbe maintained ties with brother Alois but eventually severed all contacts after Alois' savvy wife reprimanded Anton for wasting too many matches lighting his cigars. The housewife's frugality was completely alien to Ažbe, who never hesitated offering free tuition to students in need and lending them cash. An obituary noted that "he was a man of almost proverbial modesty... one of the most original and best-known personalities of Munich."

== Ažbe as a creator ==
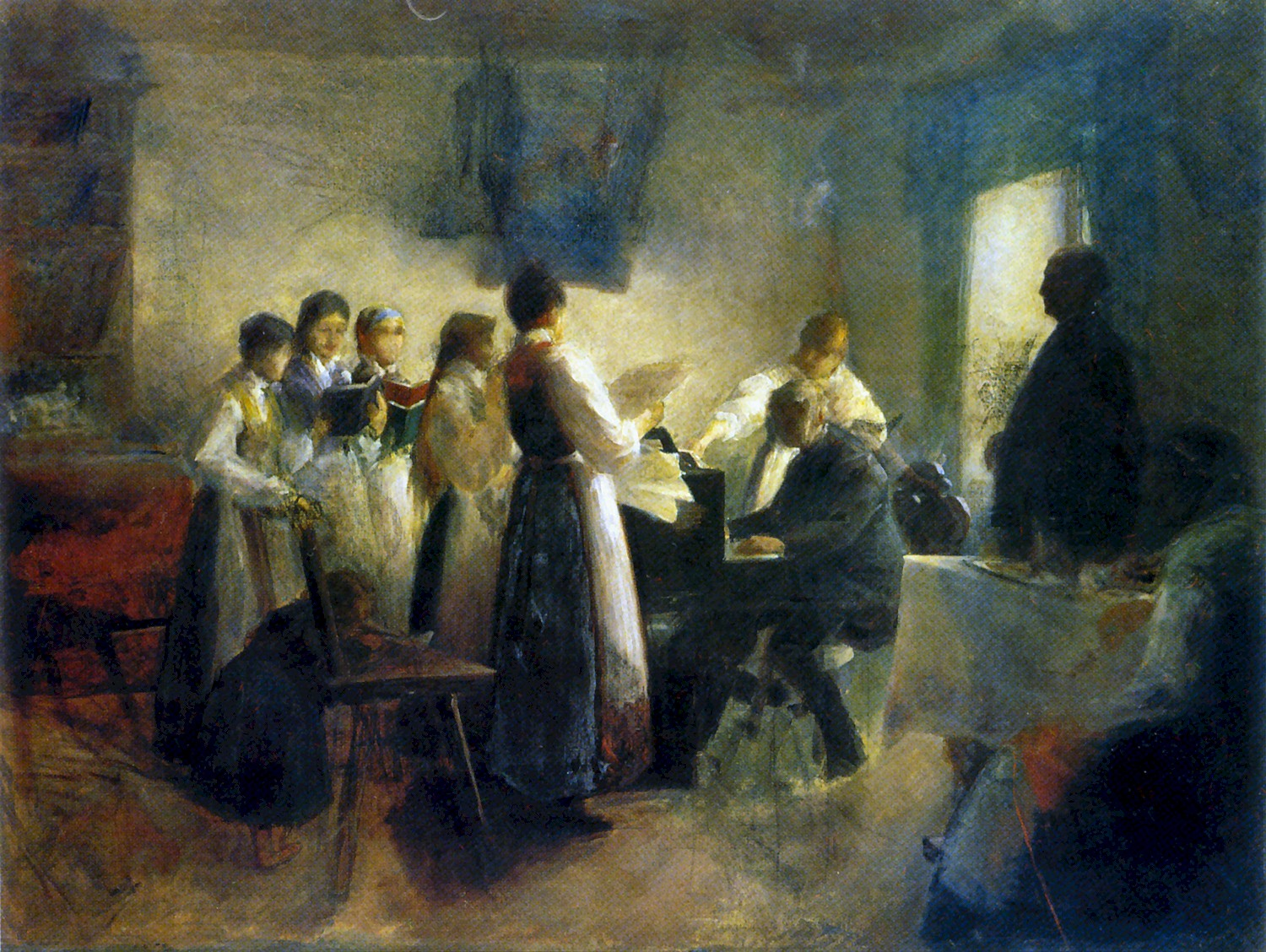
The Village Choir, around 1900

Loyal students Igor Grabar and Dmitry Kardovsky noted portraits by Ažbe for his "superb drawing" marred by dry, if not dull, paint technique. Modern critics divide over Ažbe's significance as a painter, not in the least because his surviving undisputed legacy is limited to twenty-six works. Eleven of these are early paintings and classroom studies from his college years. Only four paintings, dated from 1890 to 1903, can be considered mature art influenced by the Munich Secession. The largest and most complex of these, The Village Choir, has been irreversibly damaged by a botched restoration. Photographs and memoirs testify to the existence of his other works, now lost or hidden in private collections.

Lack of hard evidence prompted conflicts among historians and critics, further aggravated by the politics of the former Yugoslavia and its successor states. Baranovsky and Khlebnikova noted that by the end of the twentieth century, Ažbe the creator has become a myth, just like Ažbe the person became a legend after his death.

Frantz Stele (1962) and Peg Weiss (1979) have extensively studied Ažbe's relationships with the emerging avantgarde art and mature impressionism, and considered Ažbe to be a forerunner of modernist art, a link between Cézanne and Kandinsky. Both studies, in particular Weiss', were rejected by Tomaž Brejc who reasoned that any parallels between Ažbe and Cézanne are moot because Ažbe never mastered Cézanne's technique and there is no evidence that he ever attempted it.

== Ažbe as a teacher ==
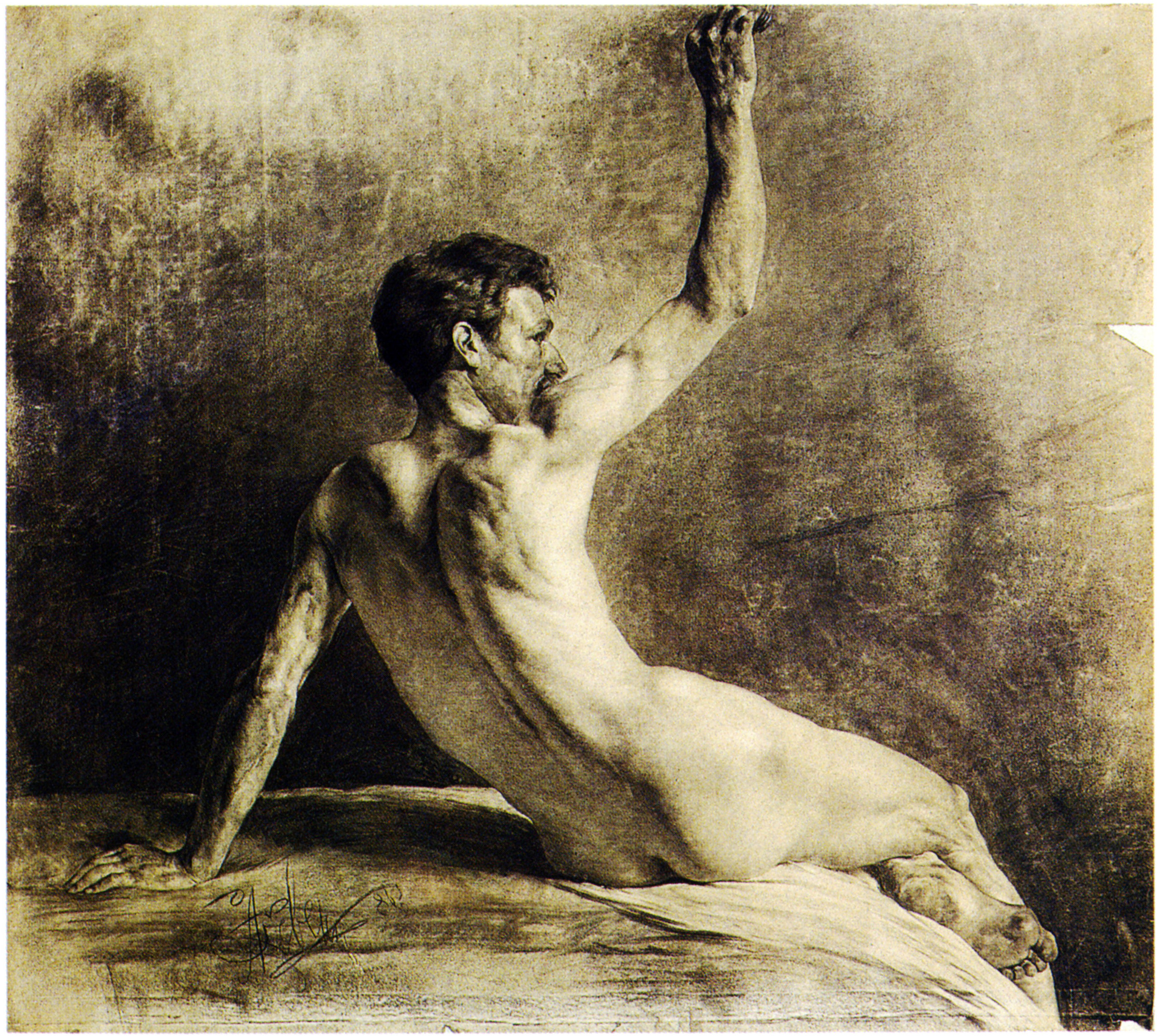
Ažbe, himself a master of human anatomy (an 1886 class study pictured), enforced figure drawing studies that were bitterly resented by Wassily Kandinsky.

Supporters (Igor Grabar) and opponents (Mstislav Dobuzhinsky) of Ažbe training system agree that it relied, at least in the beginners' classes, on two paramount ideas: the Main Line and the Ball Principle (German: Kugelprinzip). Ažbe discouraged beginners from focusing on minor details, instead of forcing them to build the image around one bold "Main Line". He enforced drawing in black charcoal that enabled quick and radical corrections of the students' work. Dobuzhinsky admitted that these intrusions into his early work were an eye-opener, "an excellent tool against dilettante, myopic copying of reality..." although for many students it spelled their end as painters: overwhelmed by the "Main Line", they did not dare to step over it and "beef it up" with relevant details.

The Ball Principle, in its most practical application, portrait, stipulated that a human head is simply a sphere; reproducing lighting of a human head follows the same rules as reproducing a plaster ball. Facial features in this system are merely protrusions and cavities of the ball's surface. Once the student mastered these basics, Ažbe carefully led him to a different interpretation, that of a head as a polyhedron composed of flat surfaces and sharp ridges – in Dobuzhinsky's opinion, a precursor to cubism.

Ažbe, himself a master of human anatomy, enforced rigorous training in this subject, from nude figure drawing to attending autopsies. Igor Grabar, who approved this approach, recalled that in the process he memorized all human muscles and bones by heart to the point where he easily reproduced them in plaster with closed eyes. Wassily Kandinsky, on the contrary, dreaded figure drawing sessions: "I quickly encountered a constraint upon my freedom that turned me into a slave, even only temporarily in a new guise – studying from a model. Two or three models 'sat for heads' or 'posed nude'. Students of both sexes and from various countries thronged around these smelly, apathetic, expressionless, characterless natural phenomena who were paid fifty to seventy pfennig an hour... the people who were of no concern to them... they spent not one second thinking about art."

Kandinsky, in his mature years, stayed aside from portraiture or nude figures, and his few rare examples were "featureless, weightless and transparent, a mere cipher without substance" – an opposite of Ažbe's own intentions. Yet, Kandinsky also appreciated Ažbe's view that no theory and no set of rules should subdue the artist's will, and quoted Ažbe: "You must know your own anatomy but in front of an easel you must forget it".

Painting in colour was a distant target that required prerequisite mastery of line, shape and anatomy. All memoirists noted Ažbe's aversion to mixing paints on a palette; instead, he recommended painting with raw paints and wide brushes. A wide brush covered with layers of different paints could, according to Ažbe, paint a human forehead in a single powerful stroke, a skill that required years of rigorous, sometimes exhausting, training. Ažbe frequently compared a proper oil painting to a diamond: raw paints must retain their independence, like the facets of a gem. Ažbe himself adopted this style, later called "crystallization of colour", only in the middle of the 1890s. While Igor Grabar praised this style and elevated it to a level of a whole system developing in parallel to impressionism, Dobuzhinsky (who never mastered the power stroke) called it "an artful magicians' trick... colourful but greasy painting devoid of its essence, the 'tone'."

== Notable alumni ==
In chronological order, by year of admission:

- Rihard Jakopič (1892–?)
- Ludvík Kuba (1895–1904)
- Ivan Grohar (1896–?)
- Igor Grabar (1896–1901)
- Alexej von Jawlensky (1896–1905)
- Dmitry Kardovsky (1896–1900)
- Marianne von Werefkin (1896–1905)
- Matija Jama (1897–)
- Wassily Kandinsky (1897–1899)
- Yelena Makovskaya (1897–1899)
- Nikolai Root (1897)
- Pavel Shmarov (1897–1898)
- Matej Sternen (1897–1905)
- Nadežda Petrović (1898–1901)
- Beta Vukanović
- Ljubomir Ivanović
- Borivoje Stevanović
- Kosta Miličević
- Milan Milovanović
- Ivan Bilibin (1899)
- Mikhail Shemyakin (1900–1902)
- Mstislav Dobuzhinsky (1899–1901)
- Oleksandr Murashko (1901)
- Kuzma Petrov-Vodkin (1901)
- David Burliuk and Vladimir Burliuk (1903)
- Karl Friedrich Lippmann (1903–1906)
- Eugeniusz Żak (1903–1904)
- Hakob Kojoyan (1903–1905)
- Leonhard Frank (1904)
- Oskar Herman (1904)
- Josip Račić (1904)
- Konstantin Dydyshko (1905)
- Abraham Manevich (1905)

After the death of Anton Ažbe, the school trained a group of Estonian painters: Johannes Greenberg, Anton Starkopf, and Ado Vabbe.

== Sources ==
- Baranovsky, Victor I.; Khlebnikova, Irina B. (2001). Антон Ажбе и художники России (in Russian). Moscow: Moscow State University. ISBN 5-211-04447-9.
- Shulamith Behr (2000). Veiling Venus: gender and painterly abstractions in early German modernism, in: Katie Scott, Caroline Arscott (editors) (2000). Manifestations of Venus: art and sexuality. Manchester University Press. ISBN 0-7190-5522-9, ISBN 978-0-7190-5522-5.
- Konrad Boehmer (1997). Schönberg and Kandinsky: an historic encounter. Taylor & Francos. ISBN 90-5702-046-7, ISBN 978-90-5702-046-9.
- Grabar, Igor E. (2001). Volodarsky, Vsevolod M. (ed.). Моя жизнь: Автомонография. Этюды о художниках (in Russian). Moscow: Respublika. ISBN 5-250-01789-4.
- Dirk Heisserer (2008) (in German). Wo die Geister wandern: Literarische Spaziergänge durch Schwabing. C.H.Beck. ISBN 3-406-56835-1, ISBN 978-3-406-56835-0.
- Peter Howard Selz (1974). German expressionist painting. University of California Press. ISBN 0-520-02515-6, ISBN 978-0-520-02515-8.
