= Kevade unelm =

1927 film

- Directed by: Voldemar Päts
- Written by: Voldemar Päts
- Starring: Georg Russy (Rusi); Elsa Silber; Leonid Puhov; Olga Päts; Johan Köösel; Olga Holts; Alfred Hindrea; Anna Udal; Voldemar Päts
- Cinematography: Voldemar Mannov
- Distributed by: Film-Klubi
- Release date: December 6, 1927
- Country: Estonia
- Language: Estonian

Kevade unelm (English: A Spring Dream) is an Estonian feature film made in 1927. A total length of 1 minute and 9 seconds of the film has survived.

== Plot ==
Enn Mänd, a young and high-principled construction engineering student from the island of Vilsandi, and Hilma Aamisep, the daughter of a wealthy family in the capital, dream of happiness together. The building contractor Pilliroog is jealous about their love. Through his business connections, he pressures Hilma's upstanding parents to influence their daughter to befriend him. He resorts to intrigue and violence to achieve his goals. The depiction of the life of upstarts in the Estonian capital in the 1920s gives the silent film a socially critical character.

== Cast ==
- Georg Russy (Rusi) as Enn Mänd, a technical college student
- Elsa Silber as Hilma Aamisep, the daughter of an upstart
- Leonid Puhov as Ants Kivistik, a student, Mänd's friend
- Olga Päts as Aino, Kivistik's friend
- Johan Köösel as Jaak Aamisep, an upstart
- Olga Holts as Aamisep's wife
- Alfred Hindrea as Pilliroog, a building contractor
- Anna Udal as Hilda, Aamisep's servant
- Voldemar Päts as a construction engineer
- Oberman as the helmsman
- Aleksander Kleius as the assistant mate
- M. Laks as the sailor
- Arthur Toom (Artur Toom) as the Vilsandi lighthouse keeper
