= Armastuse pisielukas =

1921 film

- Directed by: Paul Sepp
- Written by: Liandro-Tamberg
- Starring: Liandro; Marta Okaha; Rauer
- Cinematography: Theodor Märska
- Distributed by: Estonia-Film
- Release date: 1921
- Country: Estonia
- Language: Estonian

Armastuse pisielukas (The Love Bug) is an Estonian feature film made in 1921, directed by Paul Sepp.

The film has not been preserved, and nothing is known about its content. It was the first feature film from the company Estonia-Film, described as "a short funny story that takes place in Tallinn." Filming was completed in Tallinn in one day.
