= Ly Seppel =

Estonian poet and translator

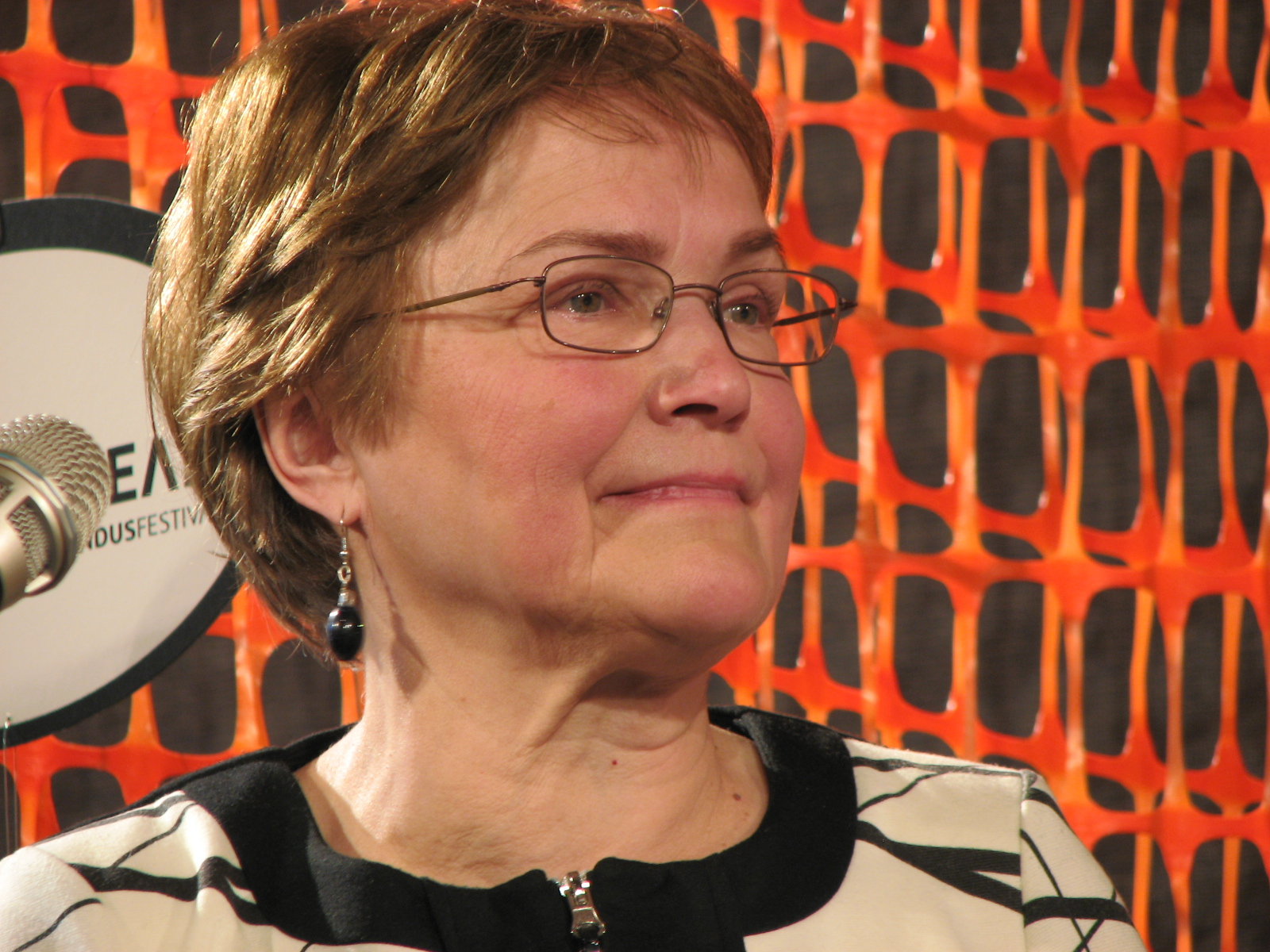
- Seppel in 2011
- Born: 30 April 1943 (age 83); Haapsalu

Ly Seppel (born 30 April 1943) is an Estonian poet and translator.

== Biography ==
Ly Seppel was born 30 April 1943.

She graduated from the University of Tartu in 1967. She studied Estonian philology there and Turkic languages in Baku and Moscow. She later studied psychotherapy in Holbæk, Denmark.

Seppel is best known for her prose for children's books and her poetry. In addition, she has appeared as a lyric translator from various Turkic languages (Turkish, Azerbaijani, Uzbek, Kazakh, Tatar and Turkmen), Russian and Finnish. With her husband, she translated a selection of stories from One Thousand and One Nights into Estonian from Russian in 1984.

Seppel married the Estonian poet Andres Ehin in 1975. The couple had three daughters, one of whom is Kristiina Ehin.

== Selected works ==
=== Poetry ===
- Igal hommikul avan peo (1965)
- Ma kardan ja armastan (1973)
- Varjuring ümber tule (1974)
- Ajasära (2003)
- Mälujuur=The Root of Memory (2009)

=== Children's books ===
- Kaarini ja Eeva raamat (1981)
- Unenäoraamat (1984)
