= Estonia-Film =

Film production company based in Estonia

Estonia-Film was an Estonian film organization and film production company.

The company was established on 10 September 1920 by the Parikas brothers, together with Konstantin and Theodor Märska.

In 1922, at the company's initiative, the cinema Rekord was established; a year later the cinema Kungla was established.

The company was liquidated in 1932.

Film Estonia production incentive supports the production of feature films, feature documentaries, animation films, animation series, high-end TV-drama and the post-production of all beforementioned works

== Filmography ==
- 1921: Armastuse pisielukas
- 1927: Kaitseväe ja Kaitseliidu paraad Tallinnas
- 1929: IV Kaitseliidu päev Tallinnas ja Kaitseliidu suvelaagrid
- 1930: Filmitäht Ita Rina Tallinnas
- 1931: Tallinna vaated
