= Rummu Jüri =

Estonian itinerant and thief

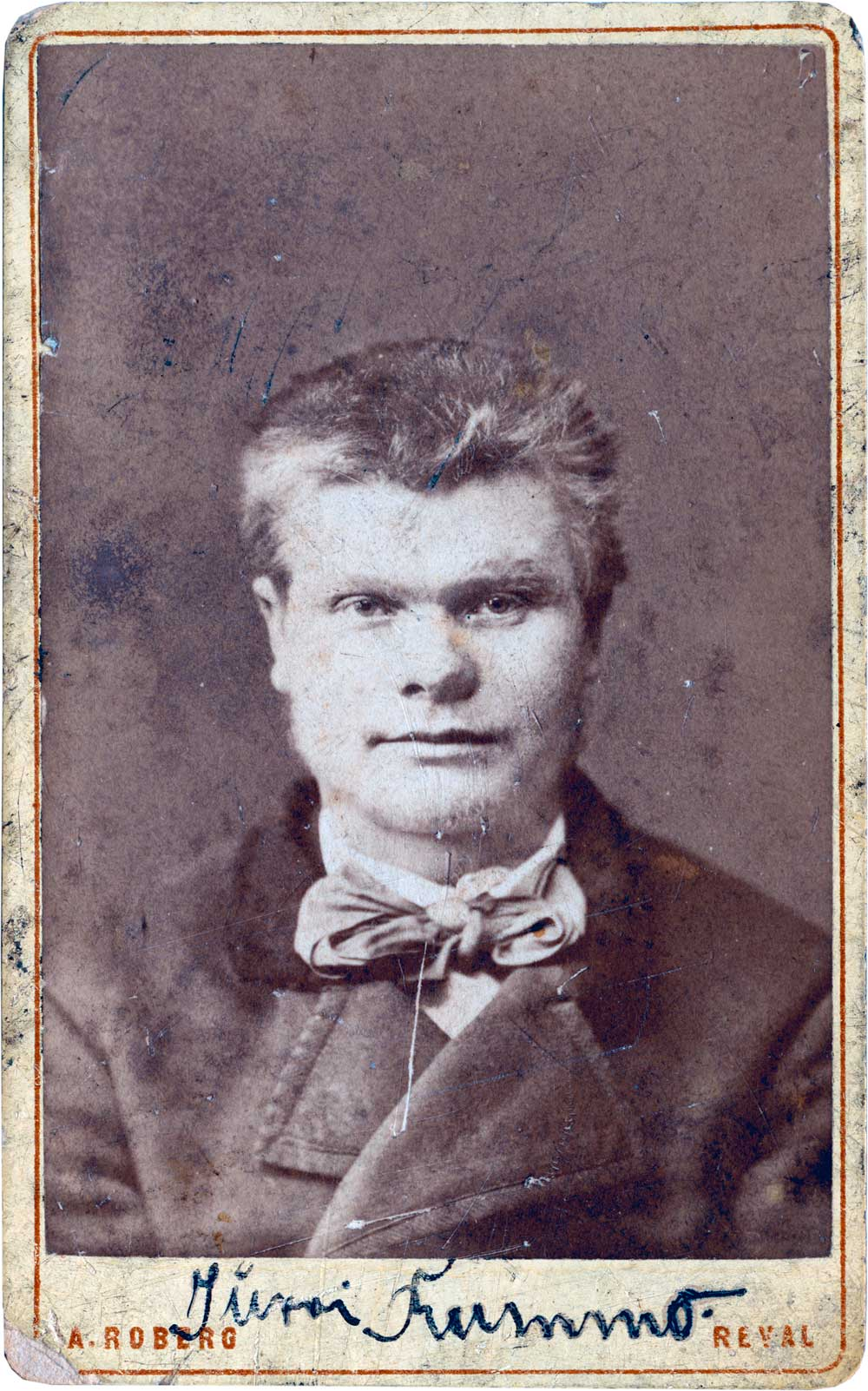
- Rummu Jüri in 1880
- Born: Jüri Rummo; 2 August 1856; Kehtna Parish, Russian Empire
- Died: Unknown
- Known for: Stealing from the rich and giving to the poor
- Parents: Jaan Rummo (father); Anna Rummo (mother)

Rummu Jüri (born Jüri Rummo; 2 August [O.S. 21 July] 1856– unknown) was an Estonian itinerant, thief and robber. He has become the archetypical Estonian folk hero, an outlaw who stole from the rich to give to the poor. Although most noted for his material egalitarianism, in the stories he also pursues other types of equality and justice.

== Early life and criminal career ==
Jüri was born in Kehtna Parish as the first child of farm tenant Jaan Rummo and his wife Anne. As a teenager, Jüri was a boarder in Kehtna manor (German: Kechtel), where he studied a little German. He once stole a piece of meat (according to other records, a bottle of wine) from the manor for his sick father, for which the gentleman sentenced him to corporal punishment. Some time later, the Harju County Court sentenced him to 6 months in prison for stealing goods from a Russian itinerant merchant.

When he got rid of it, he started robbing the manors. His closest companions on the raids were Mats Salm and Ado Antrep, who were soon caught. Repeatedly, he was hunted, but each time he managed to escape. Even from the Tallinn castle prison, where he climbed through the ceiling and finally descended from the castle tower by a rope. The German and Estonian-language newspapers of that time (Tallinna Sõber) complained that an "understood nation" was holding him "because of the luster that shines around this scammer", calling him the "Rinaldo Rinaldini of Estonia", "Fra Diavolo of our province", "Estonia's Don Juan" and stating that "women have helped or hidden him here and there in escapes". The same newspapers gave examples where he showed "pride" and helped the poor.

== Capture and aftermath ==
On 27 December (15 December 1879), Jüri was finally captured in his home municipality near in Kehtna by Jaan Seimann. He was 23 years old. Once again, he had already filed his irons and cut a wall of logs during his detention with the judge. For this and "because of defiance", the hook allowed him 30 strikes. He was brought to Tallinn in an iron, a sleigh between two transmitters sitting next to him associated with. In Tallinn Castle Prison, a special cell was adapted for him with a double ceiling and floor and an iron door, the key of which was in the hands of the prison inspector himself. At first, Jüri's iron handcuffs were still attached to the iron bar, so he didn't get any food himself, but the guards fed him "like a small child" - so the Revalsche Zeitung newspaper cheerfully announced. Jüri declared a hunger strike. Then the prison inspector reported in the same newspaper that there had been a bar only until the cell was finished, now Jüri had only his hands shackled. Iron was brought to the day attendant accompanied by 9 guards from Jüri, one of them a horse. A photograph of this course, which was also printed in Aarne Vinkel's "Estonian Public Book" (1966). We see a young man with a friendly, but determined and a bit ironic view. The Harju County Court sentenced Jüri to 6 years of forced labor in factories, but the Supreme Court increased the sentence to 15 years, especially considering the robbery in Sausti manor, where he had threatened to rob all Estonian manors.

After sending Jüri to Siberia, a message appeared in some newspapers about his escape on the way, after which panic began in Estonian manors. However, the message turned out to be wrong, apparently Jüri was also guarded with special care along the way. Only Alfred Keyserling, the inspector of the forced labour camps, brought reliable information about his work in Siberia in his memories. He met Rummo at Alexandrovskoye Prison (now Irkutsk Oblast), where it whistled and massaged him. "I took from the rich and gave to the poor," the prisoner said. "I could go anywhere if I just told who I was. I was received everywhere, better food and drinks were put in front of me, women hung around my neck. Jüri is not forgotten in Estonia".

In 1894, Jüri was sentenced to 15 years in prison when he was then 38 years old.

== Movies ==
The films Jüri Rumm (1929) and Jüri Rumm (1994) have been made about Rummu Jüri.

== Rummu Jüri in literature ==
- Andres Ehin, Rummu Jüri mälestused ("The Memoirs of Rummu Jüri"; published by Elmatar, 1996)

== Rummu Jüri in film ==
- Jüri Rumm (1929), directed by Konstantin Märska
- Jüri Rumm (1994), directed by Jaan Kolberg

== See also ==
- Estonian folklore
- Robin Hood
