= Ameerika Eestlane =

American Estonian-language newspaper

- Type: Weekly newspaper
- Format: Broadsheet
- Owner: Ameerika Eestlane
- Editor: Peter Leoke
- Founded: March 26, 1925
- Ceased publication: November 5, 1925
- Language: Estonian
- Headquarters: 38 Park Row, New York, NY; 80 Fourth Avenue, New York, NY
- Country: United States

Ameerika Eestlane (The American Estonian) was a newspaper for Estonians living abroad, published in 1925 in New York.

The newspaper was published by the Ameerika Eestlane publishing company. Altogether, 28 issues of the newspaper were published. The newspaper was published as a counterweight to the communist newspaper Uus Ilm.
