= Semyon Shkolnikov =

Soviet-Estonian cinematographer, director, screenwriter and front-line cameraman

Semyon Semyonovich Shkolnikov (Russian: Семён Семёнович Шко́льников; Estonian: Semjon Školnikov; 14 January 1918 – 27 July 2015) was a Soviet and later Estonian cinematographer, director, screenwriter, and front-line cameraman during the Great Patriotic War. He was awarded the title of People's Artist of the Estonian SSR (1978), and was the laureate of three Stalin Prizes (1946, 1947, 1951), the Nika Award (2005), and the Guild of Cinematographers' White Square Prize (2005).

== Biography ==
Born in Bakhmut, Shkolnikov developed a keen interest in cinematography from a young age. At the age of six, he appeared in a film as an extra alongside his mother. After completing school, he began working as a mechanic at the Serp i Molot plant.

In September 1934, he found himself at the Moscow Newsreel Studio, where he became Mark Troyanovsky's assistant. While working at the studio, he also attended the Institute for the Advancement of Creative Workers under the State Committee for Cinematography. He graduated from the institute in 1939. That same year, he was selected as part of a group of cameramen for a special assignment during the Winter War.

In 1940, he was conscripted into the Red Army and served as an artilleryman in the Odesa Military District. From late September 1942, in the rank of engineer-captain, he worked as an assistant cameraman in the film group of the Kalinin Front. From June 1944, he worked in the film group of the 1st Baltic Front as an assistant cameraman and later as a cameraman.

From September 1945, Shkolnikov worked at the Central Newsreel Studio. In 1946, he moved to Tallinn to join his wife and began working at Tallinnfilm from 1948. He remained at the studio until 1989.

In 2005, Shkolnikov ran as a candidate for the Tallinn City Council elections with the Estonian Centre Party, but he did not receive enough votes. In 2007, at the age of 89, he became a deputy of the Tallinn City Council after one of his party members resigned.

He was a member of the Communist Party since 1945 and a member of the Union of Cinematographers of the USSR (Estonian branch) since 1957.

Shkolnikov died on 27 July 2015, in Tallinn and was buried at the Pärnamäe Cemetery.

== Selected filmography ==
- Yachts at Sea (Estonian: Jahid Merel) as director
- Underwater Reefs (Estonian: Veealused karid) as director
- They Stole Old Toomas (Estonian: Varastati Vana Toomas) as director

== Awards ==
- Two Stalin Prizes second degree (1946, 1951).
- Stalin Prize first degree (1947).
- Order of the Red Banner (1943)
- Order of the Patriotic War (1944)
- Medal "To a Partisan of the Patriotic War" (1943)
- Medal "For the Capture of Königsberg" (1945)
- Order of the Badge of Honour (1950)
