= Tänassilma, Viljandi County =

Village in Estonia

Coordinates: 58°23′30″N 25°50′11″E

Tänassilma
- Village
- Interactive map of Tänassilma
- Country: Estonia
- County: Viljandi County
- Municipality: Viljandi Parish
- Time zone: UTC+2 (EET)
  - Summer (DST): UTC+3 (EEST)

Tänassilma (German: Alt-Tennasilm) is a village in Viljandi Parish, Viljandi County in southern Estonia. The village has 148 inhabitants. The village includes Kalmetu School and the former Tänassilma Orthodox church and cemetery. It was a part of Viiratsi Parish before 2013.

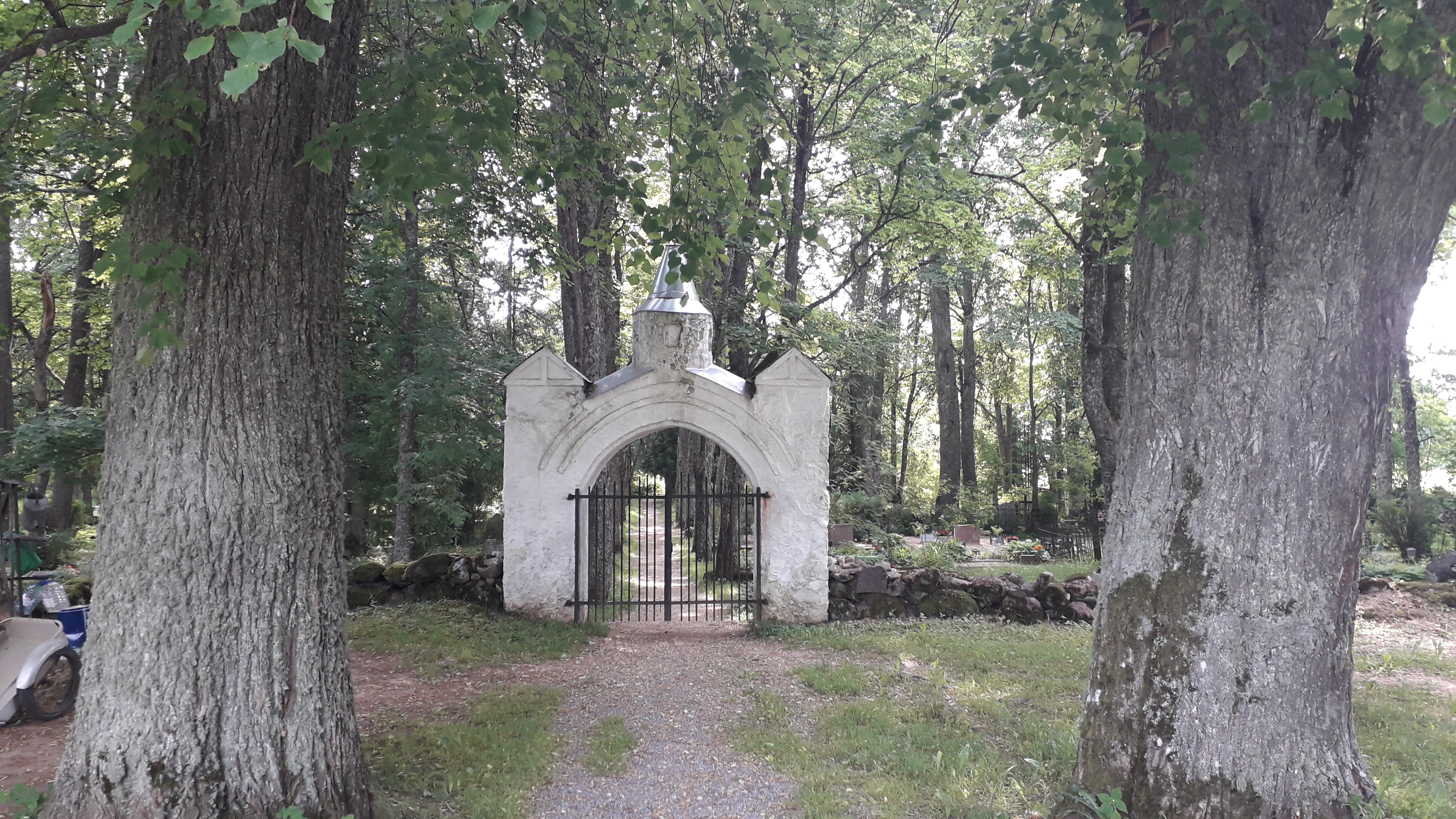
Tänassilma cemetery gate

== Notable people ==
- Viivi Luik (born 1946), poet and writer, born in Tänassilma
- Voldemar Päts (1902–1942), cinematographer and actor, born in Tänassilma
- Jaan Tõnisson (1868–1941?), politician, was born near Tänassilma
