= Tšeka komissar Miroštšenko =

1925 film

- Directed by: Paul Sehnert
- Starring: Mihkel Lepper; Valentine Vassiljeva; Niina Ormus; Kaljo Raag; Leoniide Jürisson; Alfred Hindrea; Leonid Puhov; Ella Silber; Eduard Pütsep
- Cinematography: Rudolf Unt
- Distributed by: Eesti National Film
- Release date: 1925
- Running time: 78 minutes
- Country: Estonia
- Language: Estonian

Tšeka komissar Miroštšenko (English: Tchekist Commissar Miroschtschenko) is an Estonian feature film made in 1925, directed by Paul Sehnert. Nikolai Root was the set designer. In 2012, the film was digitized.

== Plot ==
In Soviet Russia of the 1920s, the girl Agnes, her mother, Agnes's childhood friend the engineer Karl Raudsepp, and his fiancée Erna are among other Estonians waiting for permission to relocate to Estonia. Love, however, does not ask about people's plans, miserable lives, or the general atmosphere of violence. The mutual feelings between Karl and Agnes make Erna so jealous that she sends a false complaint against Agnes to the Cheka. Commissar Miroshchenko and the secret agent Hewelyn are attracted by the beauty of Agnes, who has fallen into the hands of the Cheka. Each man decides that the girl must become his.

== Cast ==
- Mihkel Lepper as Miroshchenko, a commissar in Soviet Russia
- Valentine Vassiljeva as Agnes Tõnisson, an interned Estonian
- Niina Ormus as Marie Tõnisson, Agnes's mother
- Kaljo Raag as Karl Raudsepp, an interned Estonian
- Leoniide Jürisson as Erna Tammik, Raudsepp's fiancée
- Alfred Hindrea as Hewelyn, a secret agent
- Leonid Puhov as the guardsman Vaska
- Ella Silber as Zinaida Pavlovna, Miroshchenko's lover
- Eduard Pütsep as Chilikov
