= Meie Tee =

- Editor: Harald Raudsepp
- First issue: 1931
- Final issue: 1983

Meie Tee (Our Path or Our Way) was a magazine for Estonians living abroad, published from 1931 to 1983 in New York.

The magazine was published once a month. The magazine was not published in 1981. From 1931 to 1935, the magazine was published by the Department of Literature and Art of the Estonian Education Society of New York, and then until 1940 by the Estonian Education Society of New York. From 1941 to 1960, it was published by the Estonian Educational Society and the World Estonian Association, and then until 1983 by the World Estonian Association.

After Harald Raudsepp emigrated to the United States in 1949, he assumed the editorship of the magazine.
