= Kristiina Ehin =

Estonian poet, translator, and singer

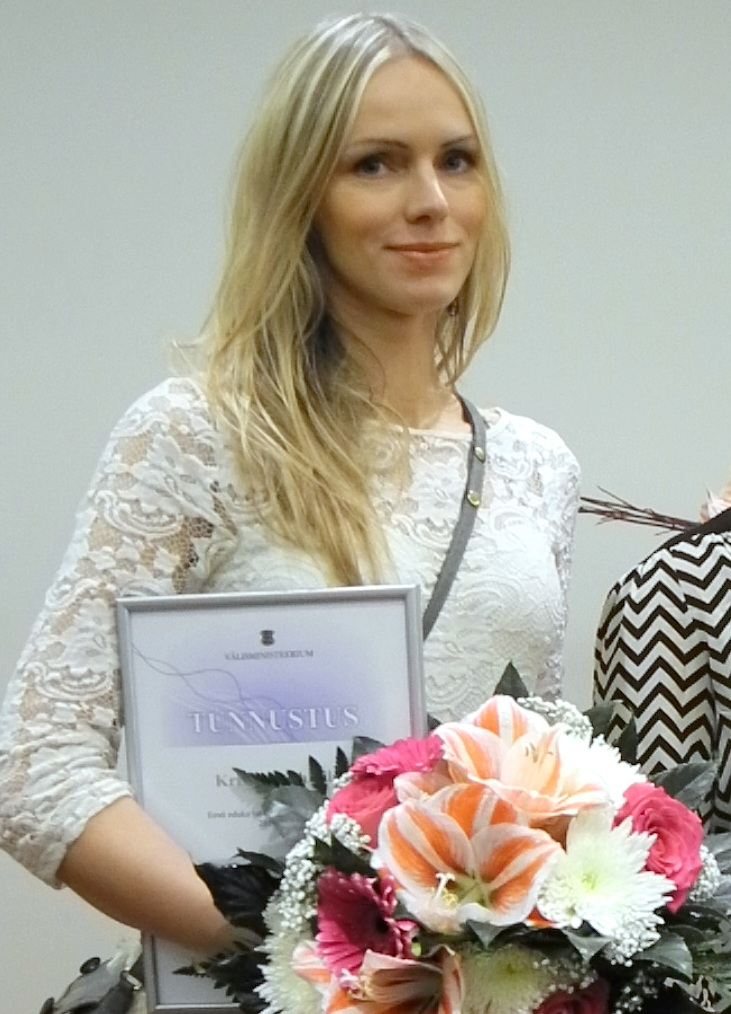
- Ehin in 2014
- Born: 18 July 1977 (age 48); Rapla, then part of Estonian SSR, Soviet Union
- Occupations: poet, translator, singer and songwriter
- Spouse: Silver Sepp
- Children: 2
- Parent(s): Andres Ehin; Ly Seppel
- Musical career
- Instrument: Vocals

Kristiina Ehin (born 18 July 1977) is an Estonian poet, translator, singer and songwriter.

Ehin studied at University of Tartu with a degree in philology and specializes in folklore. In 2004, she acquired master's degree in the Estonian language and comparative folklore field at the University of Tartu. The master's thesis topic was "The Possibilities for Interpretation of the Oldest and Newer Lied of Estonia in the Female-Religious Perspective". She has worked as a teacher at Vodja school.

Ehin has sung in the ensemble Sinimaniseele and from 2012, in the ensemble Naised Köögis (English: Women in the Kitchen), whose members are Katrin Laidre, Sofia Joons and Kairi Leivo. She represented Estonia at the satellite event of the 2012 Summer Olympics in London, Poetry Parnassus, which took place from 26 June to 1 July 2012.

From 2015 to 2016, Ehin was Professor of Liberal Arts at the University of Tartu.

== Personal life ==
Ehin is a daughter of Andres Ehin and Ly Seppel. She has a son named Hannes.

Her husband is musician Silver Sepp (:et). They have a daughter named Luike born in 2016.

Ehin is a follower of the Estonian native faith, Maausk.

== Bibliography ==
=== Poetry ===
- "Kevad Astrahanis: luuletusi 1992–1999" (Tallinn 2000)
- "Simunapäev" (Tallinn 2003)
- "Luigeluulinn" (Tallinn 2004)
- "Kaitseala" (Huma 2005)
- "Emapuhkus" (Pandekt 2009)
- "Viimane Monogaamlane. Luuletused ja jutud" (Pegasus 2011)
- "Kohtumised" (2017)
- "Aga armastusel on metsalinnu süda" (2018)
- "Janu on kõikidel üks" (Tartu 2020)
- "Janu on kõikidel kaks" (Tartu 2022)

=== Prose ===
- "Pillipuhujanaine ja pommipanijanaine" (2006)
- "Päevaseiskaja – Lõuna-Eesti muinasjutud / South-Estonian Fairy Tales" (Huma 2009), translated into English by Ilmar Lehtpere
- "Viimane Monogaamlane" (2011)
- "Kirjatud teekond" (2012)
- "Paleontoloogi Päevaraamat" (2013)
- "Südametammide taga" (2024)

=== Translations into other languages ===
- "Kivikuu: virolaista runoutta" anthology (Helsinki, 2002), translated into Finnish by Mart Velsker
- "Som en tiger bland likadana randiga" (Ariel, 2004), translated into Swedish by Peeter Puide
- "The Drums of Silence" (Oleander Press, 2007), translated into English by Ilmar Lehtpere
- "Noorkuuhommik – New Moon Morning" (Huma, 2007), translated into English by Ilmar Lehtpere
- "My brother is going off to war" (Lapwing, 2007), translated into English by Ilmar Lehtpere
- "Põletades pimedust – Burning the Darkness – An Dorchadas à Dhó" (Coiscéim, 2009), translated into English by Ilmar Lehtpere, and Irish by Gabriel Rosenstock
- "A Priceless Nest" (Oleander 2009), translated into English by Ilmar Lehtpere
- "Mond liegt in meinem Blut = Kuu on mul veres" (Edition Innsalz, 2009), translated into German by Ursula Zimmermann
- "The Scent of Your Shadow – Sinu varju lõhn" (Arc, 2010), translated into English by Ilmar Lehtpere
- "The Final Going of Snow" (Modern Poetry in Translation, 2011), translated into English by Ilmar Lehtpere
- "Ornamented Journey", kaasautor Kristi Jõeste (Saara, 2012), translated into English by Ilmar Lehtpere
- "1001 Winters – 1001 talve" (Bitter Oleander Press, 2013), translated into English by Ilmar Lehtpere
- "Ќерката на надреалистот" (DPTU PNV PUBLIKACII DOOEL, 2013), translated into Macedonian by Julijana Velichkovska
- "In a Single Breath – Ühe hingetõmbega" (Cross Cultural Communications, 2013), translated into English by Ilmar Lehtpere
- "Walker on Water" (Unnamed Press, 2014), translated into English by Ilmar Lehtpere
- "Szívemen a dalok, akár a kövek" (Magyar Napló Kiadó, 2016), translated into Hungarian by Béla Jávorszky
