= Estonian Advertising Film =

Estonian advertising agency

Estonian Advertising Film (Estonian: Eesti Reklaamfilm, abbreviation ERF) was an advertising agency active from 1967 to 1998 which promoted products in the Soviet Union. It created over 6,000 commercials, many of which were for non-existent products such as a 'Hot Air Shower' or 'Double Layered Toilet Seat' to act as propaganda. The agency was founded by Peedu Ojamaa who produced propaganda films, after Leonid Brezhnev mandated that all Soviet companies should spend 1% of their revenue on advertising. Cinematographer Harry Egipt worked on many of the commercials.
