= Mineviku varjud =

1924 film

- Directed by: Valter Palm; A. Nugis
- Starring: Voldemar Toffer; Ants Lauter; Elsa Silber; Klaara Kruus; Eduard Türk; Voldemar Step; Aleksander Rutoff; Ants Jõgi; Mihkel Lepper
- Cinematography: Konstantin Märska
- Distributed by: Eesti National Film
- Release date: December 12, 1924
- Country: Estonia
- Language: Estonian

Mineviku varjud (English: Shadows of the Past) is an Estonian historical drama film from 1924. It was Estonia's first full-length feature film. The film has not survived.

== Plot ==
In Estonia conquered by the Livonian Order, the rural people are stubbornly defending their freedom. The brave Uno escapes from captivity to his tribesmen. At the request of his parents and encouraged by the shaman of Taara, the young military chieftain Kaljo has just stepped before the people, when the peaceful people are attacked by the Livonian Brothers of the Sword. Kaljo's fiancée Laine and Uno fall into the hands of the knights. Kaljo's sister Virve sneaks into the enemy's camp and frees Uno, who joins the Estonian fighters. A battle for life and death lies ahead.

== Cast ==
- Voldemar Toffer as Olev, the elder of the people
- Ants Lauter as Kaljo, Olev's son
- Ella Silber as Virve, Olev's daughter
- Klaara Kruus as Laine, Kaljo's fiancée
- Eduard Türk as Uno, the hero
- Voldemar Step as Tuuletark the shaman
- Aleksander Rutoff as a hunchback, a castle servant
- Ants Jõgi as Ullo, a feeble-minded man
- Mihkel Lepper as Konrad von Eulenberg, a knight commander
- Aleksander Lummer as Gerhardt, a knight
- Rudolf Engelberg as Urban, a monk
