= Paul Sepp =

Estonian theater and film director (1885–1943)

- Born: October 28, 1885; Orava, Estonia
- Died: February 18, 1943 (aged 57); Tallinn, Estonia
- Occupations: Theater and film director

Paul Sepp (October 28, 1885 – February 18, 1943) was an Estonian theater and film director and theater teacher.

== Early life and education ==
Paul Sepp was born at Orava Manor in the former Orava Parish, the son of Gustav Friedrich Müller (1852–?) and Tijo Sepp (1855–?). He studied at the town school in Pskov until 1899, and at the private theater school of Yuri Yuryev in Saint Petersburg from 1906 to 1907.

== Career ==
Sepp worked as an actor in Russia, but during his military service from 1908 to 1910 he lost his voice and then devoted himself to stage management. In 1920, together with the publisher Peter Leoke, Sepp founded the private Drama Studio Theater School in Tallinn in 1921 and worked there intermittently until 1933, when the school closed due to financial difficulties. In 1924 he studied abroad in Germany.

Sepp worked as a director from 1920 to 1924 at the Estonian Drama Theater, in 1925 at the Vanemuine Theater, from 1925 to 1929 at the Estonian National Opera, from 1927 to 1928 at the Rändteater, and from 1929 to 1936 at the Drama Studio Theater. From 1932 to 1940, he operated his own private theater studio, and from 1938 to 1941 he was a lecturer at the Tallinn Conservatory's National School of Performing Arts.

== Filmography ==
- 1921: Armastuse pisielukas (The Love Bug)
- 1935: Eesti Raamat. Pildistusi eesti kirjanduse neljasaja-aastaselt arenguteelt (The Estonian Book. Pictures from the Four-Hundred-Year Development Path of Estonian Literature), documentary
