= Uus Ilm =

Estonian newspaper

- Type: Weekly Estonian language newspaper
- Founded: 1909
- Ceased publication: June 1989
- Political alignment: Communist
- Language: Estonian
- Headquarters: Monroe, New York
- Circulation: 550 (1925)

Uus Ilm (Estonian for New World) was an Estonian language communist newspaper published from Monroe, New York. It began publication in 1909.

== History ==
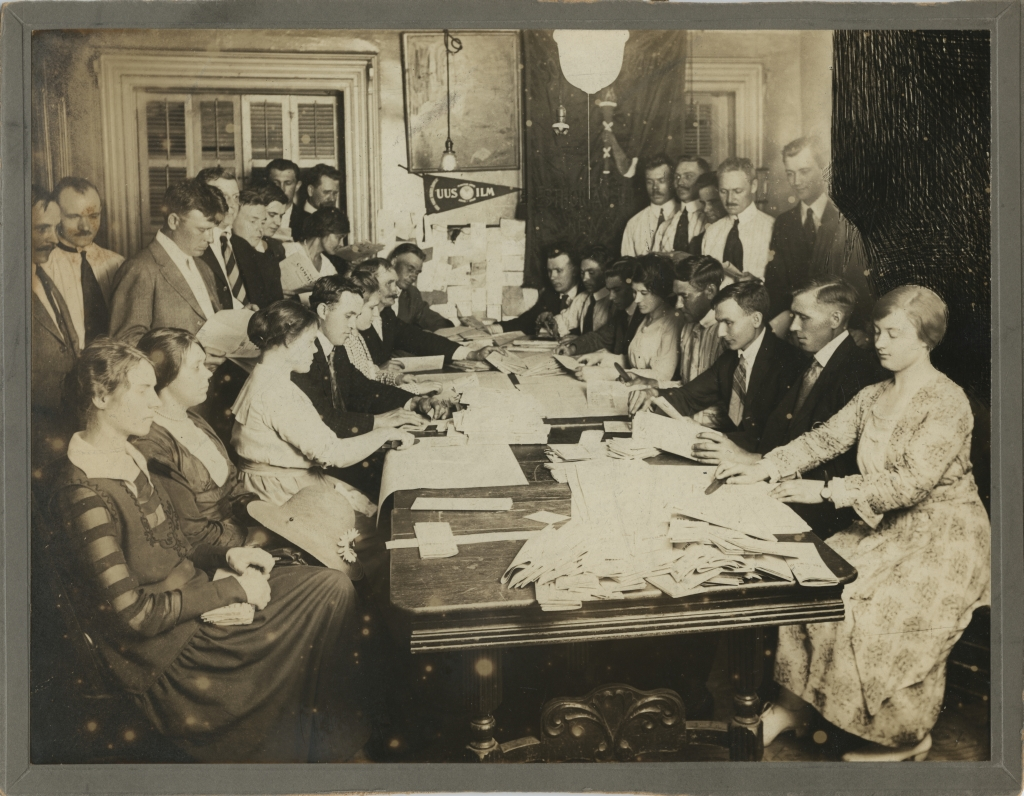
People folding copies of “Uus Ilm,” 1911

During the 1920s, it was tied to the Estonian Language Federation of the United Communist Party of America. As of 1925, it had a weekly circulation of 550. Its editor then was Aleksander Kovel, Mihkel Nukk was the editor from 1933 to 1938, from 1940 to 1944 and from 1947 to 1989. Already during the 1930s, the newspaper had very few subscribers and most of the circulation was distributed free of charge. During the World War II events, the newspaper supported the Soviet line, also approving of the forceful integration of Estonia into the USSR. The paper depicted the life in Estonian from the Soviet point of view and treated Marxism and the issues of the US workers of Estonian descent.

Uus Ilm stopped being published in June 1989 due to lack of purchasers.

== Sources ==
- http://www.ihrc.umn.edu/research/periodicals/estonian.htm
- http://www.marxisthistory.org/history/usa/parties/cpusa/1920/09/0914-ucp-reporttoecci.pdf
- http://mia.marxists.org/history/usa/eam/lf/lfedestonian.html
- http://www.marxists.org/history/usa/eam/cpa/cpapubs.html
