= Konstantin Märska =

Estonian cinematographer and film director

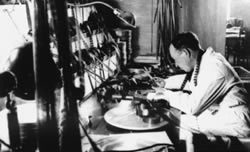
Konstantin Märska at Estonian Culture Film in 1936

Konstantin Märska (28 May [O.S. 16 May] 1896 in Kuresaare, Governorate of Livonia – 30 August 1951 in Tallinn) was an Estonian cinematographer and film director.

Konstantin Märska was one of the pioneers of Estonian cinema, and played a key role in the development of the country's cinema. He is known for his artistic style in documentaries and early feature films, including Mineviku varjud (1924), and Jüri Rumm (1929). His artistic style is best seen in Kalurid (1936), a cinematographic portrayal of the life at the seaside, and Tallinna Turg (1926), widely considered as the first trick film in Estonia.

In 1919, he co-founded Estonia-Film with his elder brother Theodor Märska (1889-1961), who later worked in Hollywood under the name of Theodor De La Carde. Theodor is known for developing the Tally Camera (patented in 1932).

Konstantin Märska had two daughters, Evi and Liia.

Märska is buried at Rahumäe Cemetery in Tallinn.

== Filmography ==
- 1924: Mineviku varjud
- 1929: Dollarid
- 1929: Vigased pruudid
- 1929: Jüri Rumm
- 1930: Kuldämblik
- 1936: Pühad Petseris
- 1937: Vaated Osmussaarelt
- 1937: Nobedate näppude linn
- 1939: Isoviha
- 1940: Simo Hurtta
- 1948: Eesti põlevkivi
- 1949: Hülgepüük
- 1950: Nõukogude Eesti kalurid
- 1951: Rünnak soodele
