= Veljko Stanojević =

Serbian painter (1892–1967)

Veljko Stanojević (1892–1967) was a Serbian painter.

== Biography ==
Stanojević comes from a distinguished family, a direct descendant of Prince Stanoje Mihailović from Zeoke who was killed in the Slaughter of the Knezes in 1804. Veljko's grandfather is Colonel Jeremija Stanojević (1808-1869), who was the minister of justice and education in the Principality of Serbia, president of the Supreme Court, president of the Serbian Learned Society, state advisor. His grandmother is Marija Mara Nenadović, daughter of Mateja Nenadović, grandson of Prince Aleksa Nenadović. According to his grandmother's lineage, he was related to the Karađorđević.

Veljko Stanojević's training in painting began at the School of Arts and Crafts in Belgrade with Ljubomir Ivanović and Marko Murat. Upon graduation, he joined the Serbian Supreme Command as a volunteer and war artist. In late 1919, he moved to Paris where he studied at the Académie de la Grande Chaumière for two years and then decided to live there until 1930. He is a representative of constructivist painting in Serbia, while his later work reoriented to coloristic expressionism. His work in the spirit of "idealized reality", which emerged in the 1920s, is considered by critics to be his most authentic creative period, making Veljko Stanojević one of our most significant painters of the third decade of the 20th century. He exhibited for the first time in Belgrade in 1922 and later at numerous group and solo exhibitions in Yugoslavia, Europe, and America.

On the occasion of the exhibition in the RTS gallery, art critic Stanislav Zivković wrote about Veljko Stanojević's painting:

One of the bards who participated in the development of modern expression in Serbian painting from the very beginning was Veljko Stanojević. Through more than fifty years of artistic activity, he went through and experienced all its stages: as a curious beginner, then as a mature artist and a fighter for the contemporary, finally as a slightly weary observer, who left the arena younger and belligerent.

The fact remains that Veljko Stanojević is one of our significant painters and pioneers, whose work between the two wars largely determined the life of new art. Together with Živorad Nastasijević, Vasa Pomorišac and Ivan Radović, he characterizes those tendencies in Serbian painting that, beginning with the achievements of Cézanne and the latest achievements of the Cubists, sought to achieve, through well-understood modernism, the purity of sobriety of the great classics.

Veljko Stanojević's paintings are on display at the National Museum in Belgrade, the Museum of Contemporary Art and the Museum of Natural History.

== See also ==
- List of painters from Serbia
