= Todor Manojlović =

Todor "Todoš" Manojlović (Veliki Bečkerek, Austria-Hungary, February 17, 1883 – Zrenjanin, Yugoslavia, 27 March 1968) was a poet, playwright, essayist and art critic. He laid the foundations of modern Serbian drama with his first major work "Centrifugal Player" (1930). He is considered to be an important representative of European values and trends in Serbian culture.

== Family ==
Todor came from the Manojlović family, who lived in Bečkerek on Michael Pupin Street. His parents were attorney Nikola "Niko" Manojlović and Sofija "Soka" Manojlović, née Petrović. They both died of severe illness. Sofija's sisters Linka Krsmanović and Olga Putić, as well as brother Joca Petrović, immediately took over the responsibilities of caring for them while they were still in their teens.

== Education ==
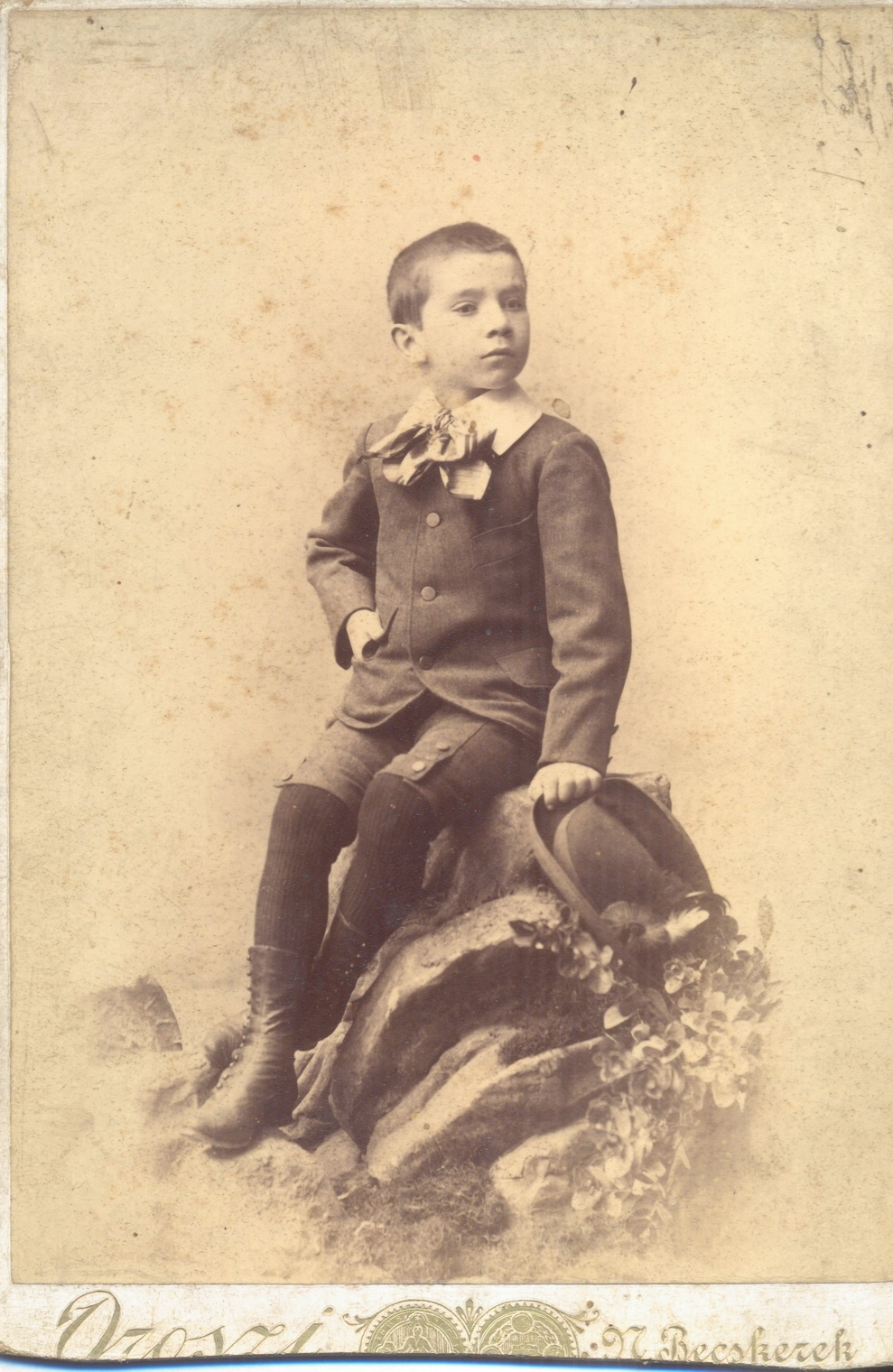
Portrait of Todor Manojlović as a boy

Manojlović was a recipient of the "Avramović Foundation", one of 50 theological scholarships granted by the Serbian Patriarchate then located in Sremski Karlovci. Beginning in 1894, when he was in junior high at Veliki Bečkerek, he received the 300-florin annual scholarship.

== Early life ==
He first studied law in Nagyvárad (today Oradea, Romania), where he met Hungarian poet Endre Ady. With a group of artists and writers, he gathered around "Holnap" (Tomorrow), a paper in Nagyvárad which eased him into the literary-art world. From 1910 he studied art history in Munich, and from that time he corresponded with Vienna writer Stefan Zweig. The coming pre-war years he spent in Timișoara, Florence, Rome, Venice where he studied Art History. He graduated from the Faculty of Philosophy, Department of Art History in Basel in 1914.

== Career ==
The First World War found him in Italy. In 1916 he went to Corfu as a volunteer and contributor to Srpske Novine and Zabavnik. Between the two world wars, he lived in Belgrade and participated in public life as a cultural worker. Manojlović's poetry was published in the entertainment journal Zabavnik. As an art critic, Manojlović also reviewed exhibits in fine arts, and wrote about paintings by Miloš Golubović, Vasa Pomorišac, and Mihajlo Petrov in Letopis Matice srpske in 1926. A study about Claude Debussy revealed that Manojlović was a connoisseur of the musical arts as well. From 1920 to 1924 Manojlovic held such diverse posts as Opera secretary, then Senate librarian and professor at the Belgrade Art Academy.

In 1931, he was the editor of Letopis Matice srpske in Novi Sad. He translated Jacques Prevert's poems, some set to music like those of Milorad Petrović Seljančica.

He collaborated with many literary papers and magazines. He followed artistic events and wrote art criticisms. Manojlović wrote a number of poems, essays, articles and reviews that covered all areas of artistic creativity. His dramatic pieces include Centrifugalni igrač, Katinkini snovi, Nahod Simeon, Opčinjeni kralj, San zimske noći, Comedia dell arte.

In his old days, he spent most of his time in Zrenjanin as a bachelor. He lived together with the unmarried half-sister Vera Putić. He was a life-long member of the Serbian PEN Club, and in his senior years received a series of literary awards.

He died on 27 March 1968, and was buried in a family tomb at the Tomaševac cemetery in Zrenjanin. A memorial plaque was placed on the house where he lived and died.

== See also ==
- List of painters from Serbia
- Rastko Petrović
- Sreten Stojanović
- Prince Bojidar Karageorgevich
