= 1300 (disambiguation) =

1300 may refer to

- 1300, events in the year 1300
- 1300 (number)
- 14th century, 1301–1400
- 1300s decade, 1300–1309
- 1300 AM, an AM radio frequency
- UTC+13:00, time zone
- 1–300; see Toll-free telephone number
- 1300 Corporals - the name for the 1300 untrained officers of Serbian Army during WWI
- 1300 (group), an Australian music group

== Vehicles ==
- Honda 1300, a compact car
- Morris 1300, also known as the Morris 1300GT, Austin 1300, MG 1300, Wolseley 1300, Riley Kestrel 1300, and Vaden Plas Princess 1300; a small family car
- Zastava 1300, a model name used for two family cars
- Fiat 1300, a large family car
- Dacia 1300, a mid-size family car
- Triumph 1300, a sedan
