= Nikola Milojević =

Nikola Milojević may refer to:

- Nikola Milojević (footballer)
- Nikola Milojević (tennis)
- Nikola Milojević (painter)
