= Živorad Nastasijević =

Serbian painter and war artist (1893–1966)

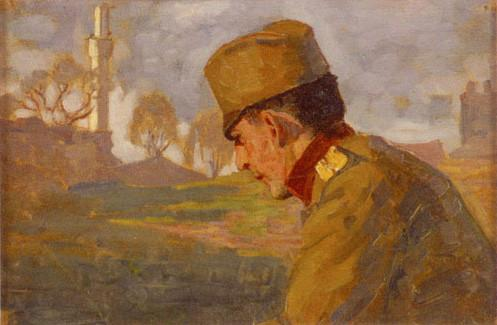
Portrait of Živorad Nastasijević, painted by Miloš Golubović in 1917

Živorad Nastasijević (Gornji Milanovac, 1893 - Belgrade, 1966) was a Serbian painter and war artist.

== Biography ==
He was born into a family where his brothers included artists, Momcilo Nastasijević, Slavomir Nastasijević, and Svetomir Nastasijević. Their father, Nikola Lazarević, moved with his mother from Ohrid to Brusnica as a six-year-old. In gratitude to Uncle Nastas Djordjević (the builder of the Holy Trinity Church in Gornji Milanovac), from whom he learned the craft, he relinquished his mother's surname and took the surname of his uncle, Nastasijević.

Živorad Nastasijević graduated from the Belgrade Art School in 1910, as a student of Djoko Jovanović, Rista Vukanović and Marko Murat. He continued his art studies at the Academy of Fine Arts in Munich under professor Igor Grabar from 1913 to 1914, but he had to quit because of the outbreak of World War I. Like many Serbian artists of the first half of the twentieth century, Nastasijević voluntarily joined the student battalion of Stepa Stepanović, participating first as a fighter until 1917 when he became ill and with bad contusions from a battle for Kaimakchalan, was eventually transported to Algeria where he spent some time convalescing. From Bizerte he went to the Salonika front as a war painter of the Serbian Supreme Command. After the war, he continued his education in the art school in the Parnasse district of Paris, the Académie de la Grande Chaumière with professor Claudio Castelucho from 1920 to 1922. On his return to the country, he took an active part in cultural events such as:

- 1920-21: he was a member of Lada.
- 1923: Member of the Group of Six: Jovan Bijelić, Petar Dobrović, Frano Kršinić, Živorad Nastasijević, Toma Rosandić, Sreten Stojanović.
- 1924: Member of Group of Four: Dobrović, Bijelić, Kosta Miličević, Nastasijević.
- 1927: He is one of the founders of the Zograf art group.
- In 1936 he again became a member of Lada, in whose ranks he remains until his death.

During his education, he displayed his works at the exhibitions of the School of Arts and Crafts. After completing his studies he exhibited in 1912 at the Fourth Yugoslav Exhibition.

At the beginning of his artistic formation, he, as a painter, was decisively influenced by his education at the Munich Academy and socializing with the painter Kosta Miličević, and in this part of his oeuvre, the influence of impressionism became more noticeable. After going to Paris, where he became acquainted with fine arts and works of the old masters, he turned to paint empty, abandoned Belgrade landscapes resembling magical realism and mythological motifs in the atmosphere.

In 1927, together with Vasa Pomorišac, he was the initiator of the Zograf Art Group, which was supposed to represent a kind of opposition to the progressive and modernist-oriented group Shape. the affirmation of medieval art and the construction of a national style based on medieval heritage and tradition.

Živorad Nastasijević worked, among other things, on fresco painting and icon painting. He performed frescoes in the Belgrade Art Pavilion building (which was destroyed during World War II), the iconostasis of the Church of Our Lady of the Cover in Belgrade, frescoes in the hall of the National Bank building in Skopje, frescoes in the Belgrade City Hall, murals in the Uspenska church in Pančevo, frescoes at Kosturnica Church in Krupanj, frescoes in several family chapels at the Belgrade New Cemetery.

He died in Belgrade in 1966.

== Group known as Oblik ==
Together with his colleagues Petar Palavicini and Branko Popović, in 1926 Jovan Bijelić formed the Oblik group, joined by Petar Dobrović, Živorad Nastasijević, Toma Rosandić, Veljko Stanojević, Sreten Stojanović, Sava Šumanović and Marino Tartalja as founding members, and later this group is joined by Ignjat Job, Zora Petrović, Ivan Radović, Mate Razmilović, Risto Stijović, architect Dragiša Brašovan. This group was made up of already established visual artists. The rules of the group were adopted at a sitting on 8 November 1930 and approved by the Ministry of Internal Affairs on 20 July 1932.

== See also ==
- List of painters from Serbia
