= Student battalion =

Student battalion may refer to:

- 1300 Corporals, officially the "Student Battalion", served in World War I
- al-Jarmaq Battalion of Fatah
- 222nd Aviation Regiment (United States)
- Personnel in the military college of the Chechen Armed Forces during the First Chechen War

== See also ==
- Student soldier (disambiguation)
