= Kiril Kutlik =

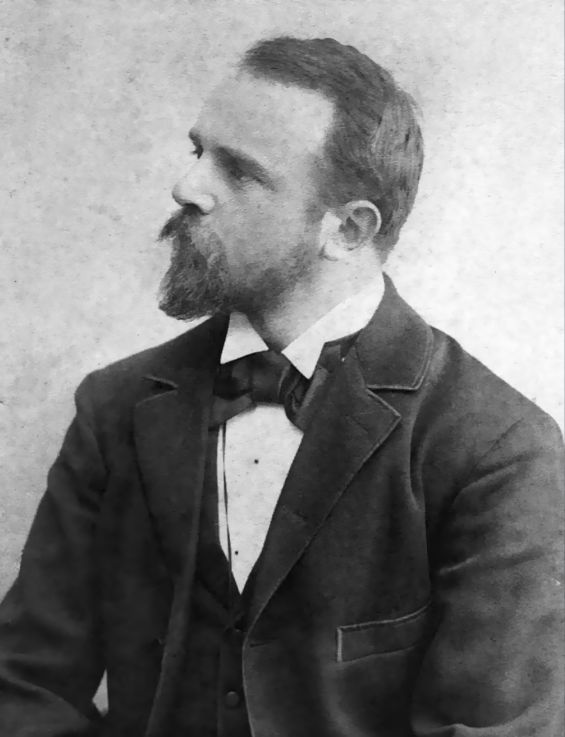
Image of Cyril Kutlík

Cyril Kutlík (Serbian: Kiril Kutlik; 29 March 1869 – 4 April 1900) was a Slovak-Czech painter, educator and illustrator. He was the founder of the Serbian Drawing and Painting School, one of the first modern painting schools in Belgrade (1895). An advocate of historicism in the visual arts, he is primarily known for his Serbian folklife motifs from the genre, portrait, sacral and historical paintings and illustrating folk calendars.

== Biography ==
Kiril Kutlik was born on 29 March 1869 in Křížlice in Bohemia, Austria-Hungary.

== Origin and family ==
His father, Bohdan Kutlik (1838–1925), an evangelical priest and editor of the Czech and Slovak periodicals, is a native of Stara Pazova, where his grandfather Jan Kutlik previously lived, working as a priest and teacher. Uncle Felix Kutlik (1843-1890), a priest, teacher, and writer, worked in Bački Petrovac, Silbas, and Kulpin.

Mother Anna, born Kratochvílová, came from the city of Prostějov in what is today the Czech Republic. He was born as the third of thirteen children in the family, only five of whom have lived for more than ten years.

== Schooling ==
At the place of his birth, he finished elementary school and high school in Hradec Králové. As a child, he showed a fondness for painting, while he showed less interest in school materials. At the age of fifteen, he made copies of paintings and illustrations in oil paints.

In 1885 he went to the Academy of Fine Arts in Prague. He completed his studies in 1891, proving to be a student with enviable successes. His final work at the academy was "The Last Moments of Hus's Freedom" which was exhibited at the Jubilee Mediterranean Exhibition in Prague (1891).

After his studies, for one year (1891–1892), he attended lectures at the Department of Historical Painting, with Professor August Eisenmenger at the Academy of Fine Arts in Vienna, and after that, he worked as a freelance artist.

== Work ==
He spent the next two years in the town of Arco Varignane, moving to Tyrol on the advice of a doctor, after he had returned symptoms of tuberculosis, from which he became ill during his studies. In Tyrol, where he resided (1893-1895), he painted about forty works, including "The First Death Victim" or "The Avely Death".

During his studies in Prague in 1887, he was in Belgrade during a ceremony organized in honor of Vuk Karadžić, and at the time he saw that Belgrade did not have a private art school, so he decided to found one. In July 1895 he came to Belgrade again and in September of the same year, he opened the Serbian Drawing and Painting School, situated in the neighborhood of Kosančićev venac (Kosančić wreath), from Kalemegdan to Brankovog mosta (Branko's Bridge). After the attempt of Stevan Todorović thirty years earlier, Kutlik became the founder of the first private painting school in Belgrade, which became the cornerstone of art education in Serbia. The school had classes for full-time and part-time students, for artisans and for women (since 1897). Students were enrolled in the school regardless of nationality or religion. Initially, he gave only practical courses and later, theoretical instruction was introduced.

French and German classes were also held for a while. The school had its own library and reproductions of paintings, reliefs and plaster models. He regularly published annual reports, and organized exhibitions of his students, with some of his work.

His most notable student was Serbian painter Nadežda Petrović, though he had other Serbian artists equally talented in their own particular genre such as Milan Milovanović, Kosta Miličević, Borivoje Stevanović, war painter Dragomir Glišić, Djordje Mihailović, Ljubomir Ivanović, Branko Popović, Natalija Cvetković, Anđelia Lazarević, and Rafailo Momčilović.

In the summer of 1899, he married Milada Nekvasilová, the daughter of Czech engineer František Nekvasil. They both believed in his healing. They went on a wedding trip to Austria-Hungary. They also arrived to visit Kiril's parents, who in the meantime moved to Dechtare, Slovakia.

Nine months later, however, Kiril had overcome the disease. He died on 4 April 1900 and was buried in the Belgrade New Cemetery, in the Nekvasil Family Tomb.

His paintings were exhibited posthumously in Paris at the Exposition Universelle in 1900.

== Legacy ==
Kiril Kutlik is part of an Early Modernist Movement in Serbia along with Anton Ažbe, Beta Vukanović, Nadežda Petrović, Mihailo Valtrović, Milan Milovanović, Kosta Miličević, Borivoje Stevanović, and Ljubomir Ivanović.

== See also ==
- List of painters from Serbia

== General sources ==
- Slovak National Gallery: Slovak: MníchMonktitle QS:P1476,sk:"Mních"
- Čukur česma: Čukur česma - srpski rečnik porekla i značenja reči i izraza
