= Jestřabí v Krkonoších =

- Municipality
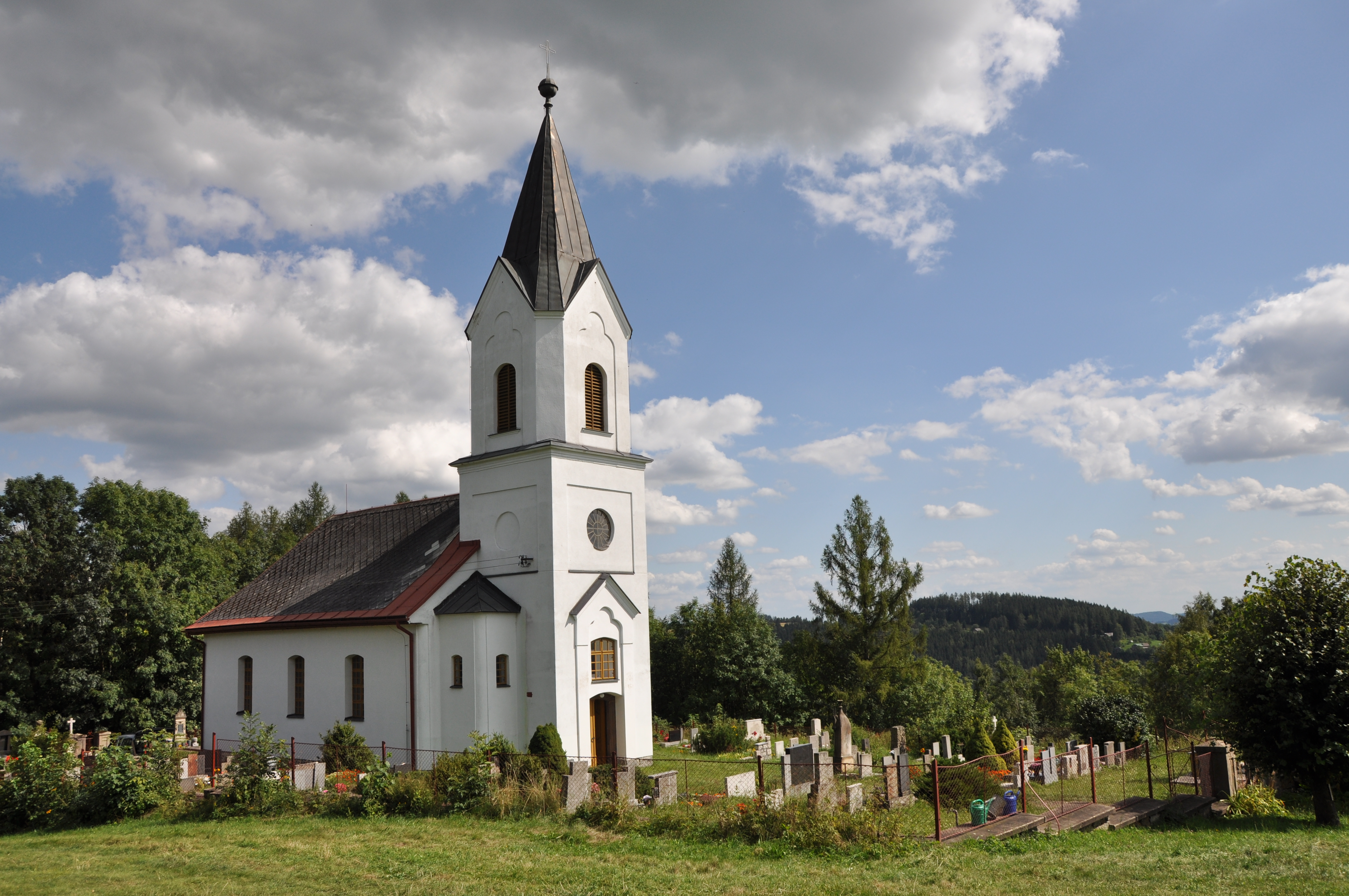
- Protestant church in Křížlice

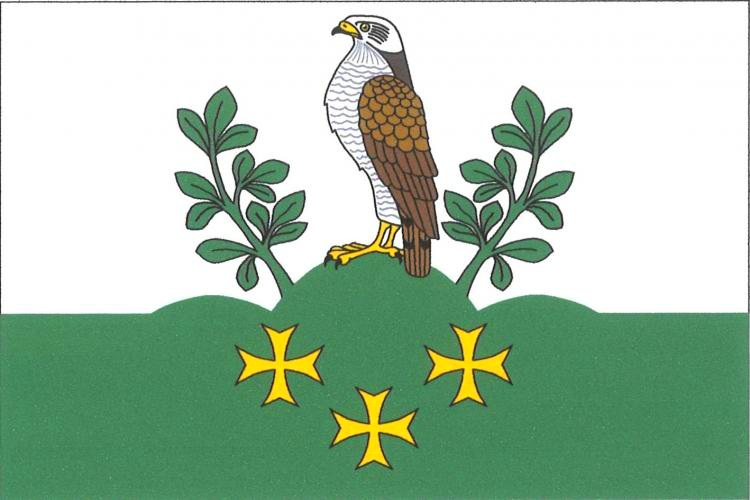
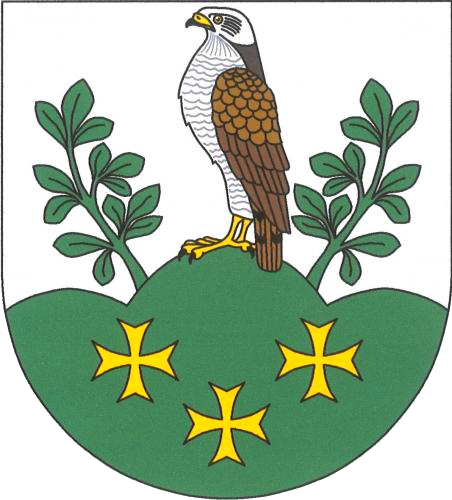
- Flag Coat of arms

- Location in the Czech Republic
- Coordinates: 50°40′50″N 15°29′31″E
- Country: Czech Republic
- Region: Liberec
- District: Semily
- First mentioned: 1562

Area
  - Total: 10.31 km^{2} (3.98 sq mi)
- Elevation: 714 m (2,343 ft)

Population (2026-01-01)
  - Total: 238
  - Density: 23.1/km^{2} (59.8/sq mi)
- Time zone: UTC+1 (CET)
  - Summer (DST): UTC+2 (CEST)
- Postal code: 514 01
- Website: www.jestrabivkrk.cz

Jestřabí v Krkonoších is a municipality and village in Semily District in the Liberec Region of the Czech Republic. It has about 200 inhabitants.

== Administrative division ==
Jestřabí v Krkonoších consists of three municipal parts (in brackets population according to the 2021 census):

- Jestřabí v Krkonoších (51)
- Křížlice (130)
- Roudnice (46)

== Demographics ==
Historical population
| Year | Pop. | ±% |
|---|---|---|
| 1869 | 1,703 | — |
| 1880 | 1,715 | +0.7% |
| 1890 | 1,625 | −5.2% |
| 1900 | 1,608 | −1.0% |
| 1910 | 1,576 | −2.0% |
| 1921 | 1,408 | −10.7% |
| 1930 | 1,299 | −7.7% |
| 1950 | 730 | −43.8% |
| 1961 | 644 | −11.8% |
| 1970 | 476 | −26.1% |
| 1980 | 360 | −24.4% |
| 1991 | 268 | −25.6% |
| 2001 | 232 | −13.4% |
| 2011 | 243 | +4.7% |
| 2021 | 227 | −6.6% |
Source: Censuses

== Notable people ==
- Kiril Kutlik (1869–1900), painter
