= Student soldier =

A student soldier is typically student that fought for their country.

The term most often refers to:

- Student soldiers who were served in the Imperial Japanese Armed Forces during the World War II. These include Japanese student soldiers, Korean student soldiers, Taiwanese student soldiers. (Refer to 学徒出陣)
- Student soldiers who served in numerous self-organized military units for the Indonesian Republican cause during the Indonesian National Revolution. (Refer to Tentara Pelajar)
- Student soldiers who were served in the South Korean Armed Forces during the Korean War. (Refer to Student Volunteer Forces)

== See also ==
- Student battalion (disambiguation)
