= Stevan Aleksić =

Serbian painter (1876–1923)

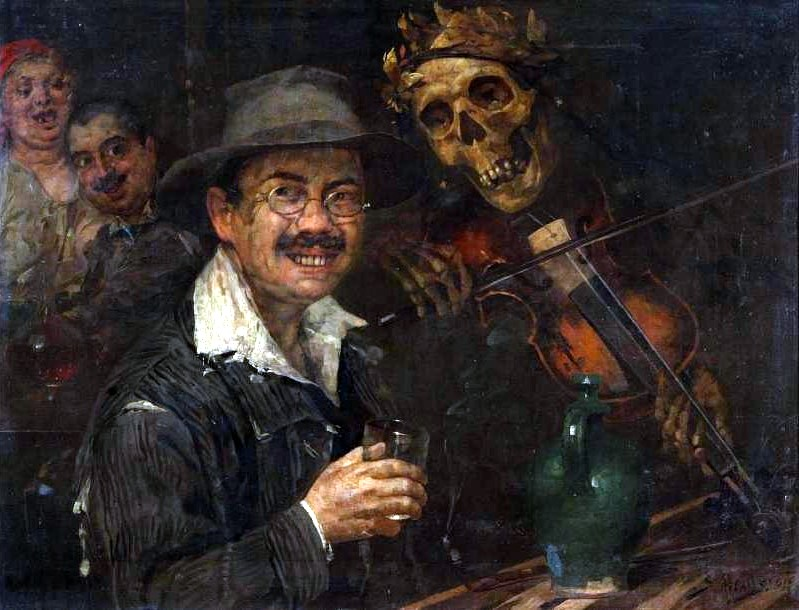
- Born: 23 December 1876; Arad, Austria-Hungary (now Arad, Romania)
- Died: 2 November 1923 (aged 46); Modoș, Kingdom of Romania (now Jaša Tomić, Serbia)
- Occupation: Painter

Stevan Aleksić (Serbian Cyrillic: Стеван Алексић) (23 December 1876 – 2 November 1923) was a Serbian painter born in Austria-Hungary. His work belongs to the Munich School. He is especially known for his series of self-portraits, dating from 1895 to 1922, which at the same time illustrate the evolution of his style and technique as well as the changes in his physique and character, and is the largest such collection in Serbian painting.

== Biography ==
Stevan Aleksić was born on 23 December 1876, in Arad, present-day Romania, to a family of artists. His father Dušan and grandfather Nikola were both painters. He finished his elementary school in Arad, where he received his first painting lessons from his father. In 1895 he moved to Munich, where he studied at the Academy of Fine Arts in the class of Nicholas Gysis. When his father died, in 1900, he decided to quit his studies and move to Modoš (today's village of Jaša Tomić, in Vojvodina, northern Serbia). There he built a house with a studio and married the local teacher, Stefanija Lukić, in 1905. The rest of his life he spent living in Modoš and working as a painter. He died on November 2, 1923.

== Work ==
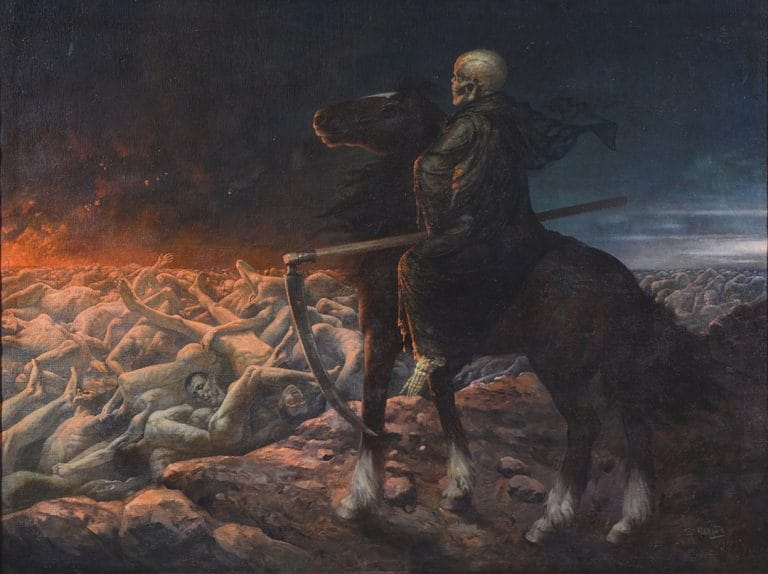
The Reaper, Matica Srpska Gallery, Novi Sad

Stevan Aleksić produced around 230 canvas paintings, decorated more than 20 churches with 100 icons and a number of wall frescoes, and made 60 sketches and drawings.

Since his early career, Aleksić dealt in decorating churches; he was especially skilled at making monumental compositions with religious or historical context and decorated a number of sacral objects around Vojvodina. At the same time, in the first decade of the 20th century, he worked as a portraitist.

One of Aleksić's most notable works is the "Merry People of Banat". He exhibited it at the 4th Yugoslav Art Exhibition in Belgrade in 1912, but received a lot of negative criticism, especially by the communist politician turned art critic Moša Pijade, who wrote that "Some fellow from Modoš, named Aleksić, produced an incredibly bad painting of the people of Banat". After this fiasco, Aleksić never again exhibited in Belgrade, and remained a marginal figure on the Belgrade art scene over the next half-century.

Even after the failure of the "Merry People of Banat" Aleksić continued to explore and vary the motive. In 1922, a year before he died, he made his last version of the painting putting himself on the canvas and thus becoming one of the participants in the festive atmosphere. Scenes from the pubs were a popular motive in his days. However, while some painters used this setting to express certain morality issues, it is believed that Aleksić had no such intentions.

Among his most notable works is a series of self-portraits produced between 1895 and 1922 It is the largest such series in Serbian painting and can be used to track his artistic, mental as well as physical development. Aleksić often depicted himself sitting at a table in a pub, but in the years prior to his death the paintings become more macabre and ominous; he is often accompanied by the figure of Death, sitting at his table, playing the violin or looking at his plate.

The largest collection of Aleksić's paintings can be seen in the Matica Srpska Gallery in Novi Sad, while the National Museum of Serbia and the National Museum in Zrenjanin also exhibit extensive collections.

== Criticism ==
Aleksić was often criticized as an epigone, a marginal artist, and an anachronic painter. His fresco "Crucifixion", painted on the facade of the Saborna Church in Sremski Karlovci, was described by the archpriest Jovan Jeremić as "a copy made after the tradition of the Western Church"; however, many of his contemporaries praised the fresco for its vibrancy and expressiveness.

Vasa Pomorišac, Aleksić's student and colleague, gave some very bitter criticism of his teacher's work: "Living in a small village, with all the petty values of such community, his spirit could not reach the soaring heights prophesied to him by his professor, Gysis. He remained far away from that great movement of purification, dying slowly in the backwater dullness, having a painful shade in his soul because he never achieved self-actualization."

== Gallery ==
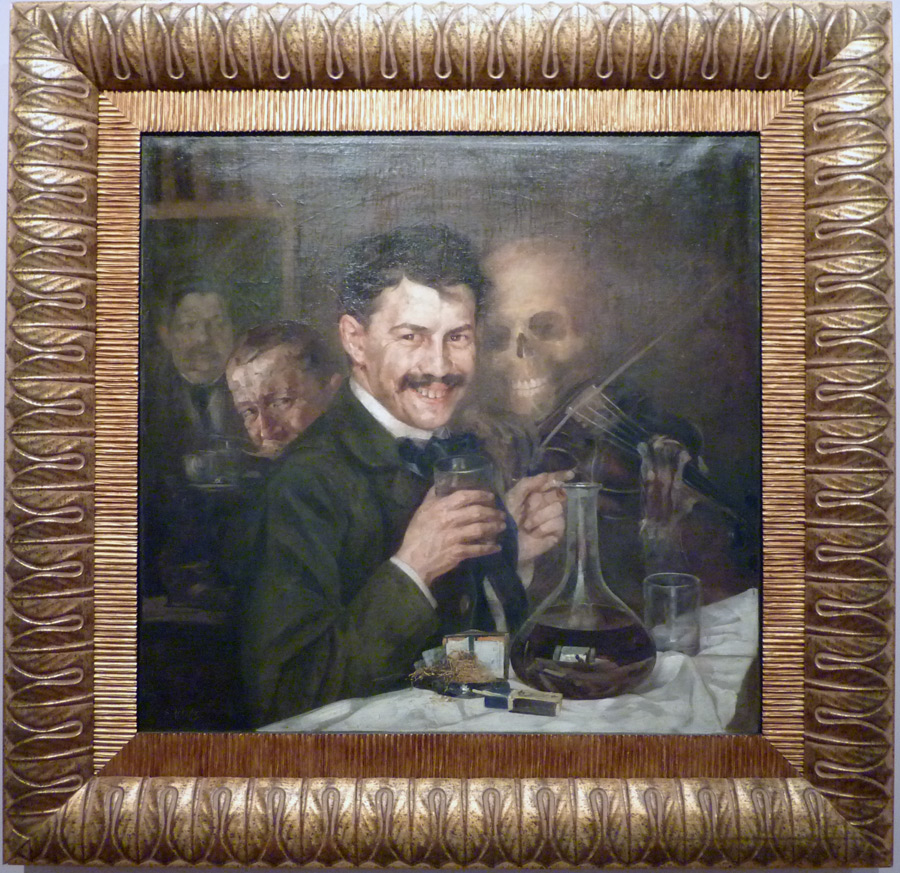
Self-portrait in a pub, Matica Srpska Gallery, Novi Sad

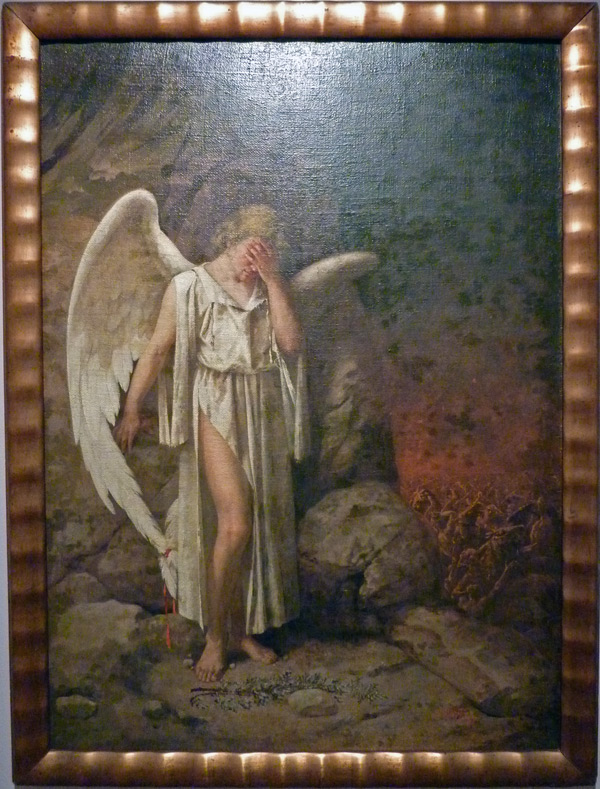
The Angel, Matica Srpska Gallery, Novi Sad

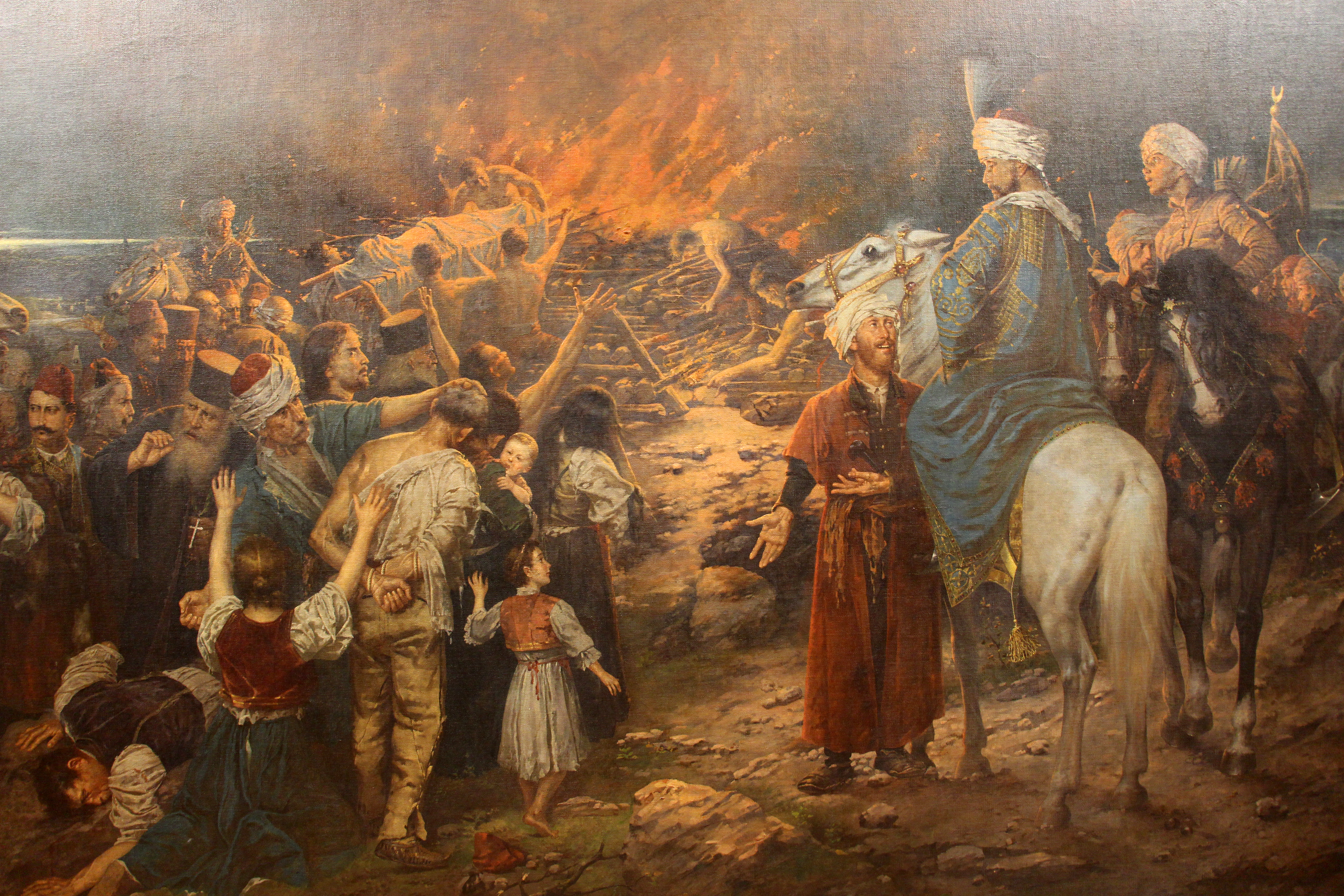
"The burning of Saint Sava's relics" (1912)

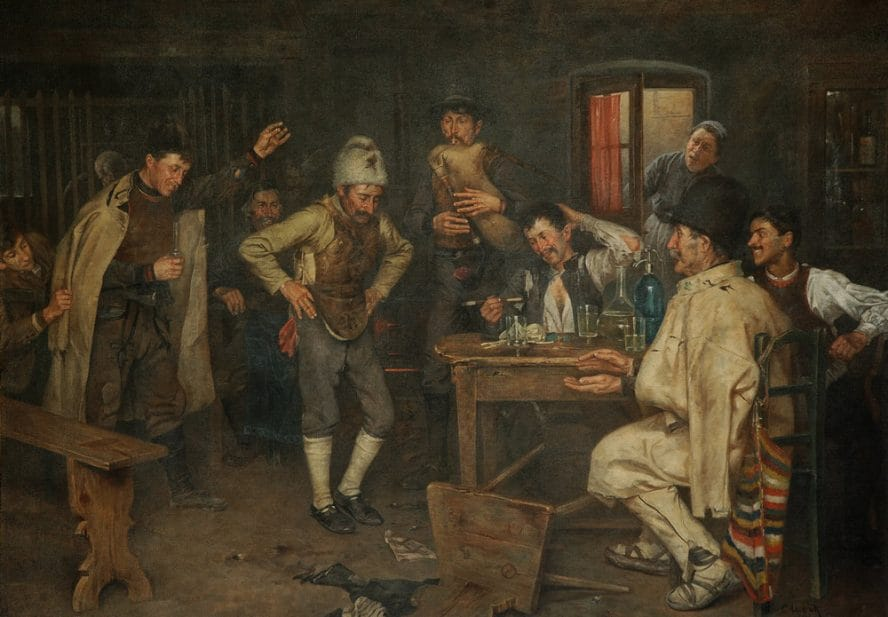
Happy Banatians (1911)
