= Vasa Pomorišac =

Serbian artist and professor (b. 1893, d. 1961)

Vasa Pomorišac (15 December 1893 — 9 September 1961) was a Serbian artist and professor at the Academy of Applied Arts in Belgrade. He worked as a painter, stained glass window maker, etcher, printmaker and he was also an art critic. He is considered an expressionist painter in the same category as his contemporaries Mihajlo Petrov, Ivan Radović, Petar Dobrović, and Jovan Bijelić.

== Biography ==
Pomorišac was born in the Serbian town of Modoš (now Jaša Tomić) in what was then part of the Austrian Empire. He first studied painting with Stevan Aleksić until 1913, when he went to the Academy of Fine Arts in Munich, where he was briefly a student of Gabriel von Hackl, Franz von Stuck and Angelo Jank. At Munich, he met fellow student Živorad Nastasijević (1893-1966), who became a close friend. His studies were interrupted by a period of national service between 1914 and 1918, when he served in the Austrian Army at the Russian front and after surrendering to the Russians, he joined the First Serbian Volunteer Division which participated with the Russians and Romanians against the Central Powers in the Battle of Dobruja, where he was wounded. Pomorišac was taken to a Moscow hospital where he soon recovered and spent the next year convalescing and at the same time familiarizing himself with the art treasures of the city and the works of great Russian painters. As a non-combatant, he was transferred from Imperial Russia to Greece, where he received the status of a "war painter" at the Photographic section (Fotografska sekcija) of the Serbian Supreme Command (Vrhovna komanda) in Salonika and worked in the Thessaloniki Atelier.

After the war, on his return to Belgrade in 1919 he visits a Munich alumnus Ljubo Babić in Zagreb and enrolls in life-drawing classes given by Beta Vukanović at the Arts and Crafts School in Belgrade. After graduation, with his friend Ljubomir Ivanović he visits Serbian monasteries and copies frescoes and murals in Serbian villages in Hungary and Romanian Banat.

He then went to London where he attended classes at Saint Martin's School of Art and the Royal College of Art while learning the craft of stained glass painting. He trained in London from 1920 to 1924 where he specialized in drawing and architecture at Saint Martin's (1921-1922) and took extra courses in stained glass painting at London's Central School of Art and Design (1922-1924), becoming the first known Serbian artist to work in that medium. There he spent time visiting museums, galleries and castles studying all kinds of aspects of arts and architecture but found England still under the influence of John Ruskin. He attended lectures by artist Percy J. Delf Smith, sculptor George Frampton, and architect William Lethaby whose visions followed the modern European trends, including his own.

He returned to Belgrade in 1924. Since he was out of work, he accepted a commission from the Roman Catholic Church community in Jaša Tomić to paint an altar icon in the Catholic Church, then being restored in the neo-Gothic style. At the School of Arts and Crafts, he replaced Beta Vukanović as a teaching master from 1930 to 1931. In Belgrade, Pomorišac's stained glass work gave the Cvijeta Zuzorić Art Pavilion "a trendy Art Deco look".

Paris was his home from 1935 to 1939. Since 1942 he was a professor at the Academy of Fine Arts in Belgarde and since 1950 at the Academy of Applied Arts in Belgrade.

He was a member of the Association of Warrior Painters and Sculptors of the 1912-1918 Wars, Lada, among the founders of Zograf (Painters) and the Association of Qualified Fine Artists in Belgrade. In 1944 he became a member of the Association of Fine Artists of Serbia (ULUS). In addition to engaging in the original painting, he often copied frescoes from our medieval churches and monasteries, which he exhibited in London and Paris, and gave three copies of frescoes from Manasija monastery to the Maritime Office at the Victoria and Albert Museum in London.

== Art career ==
Vasa Pomorišac believed that art was an organic part of society. It must be grounded in traditional creativity and such as to oppose modernism that is foreign to our cultural mentality. The Zograf (Painters) group was formed around this ideology and contained artists of the same or similar orientation - painters Stanislav Beložanski, Živorad Nastasijević, Zdravko Sekulić, Josin Car, Ilija Kolarović, Svetolik Lukić, Radmila Milojković, Zdravko Sekulić and architects Bogdan Nestorović and Branislav Kojić. Modernist criticism saw them as a national anachronism and therefore inappropriate to the new age. Pomorišac especially emphasized his attachment to the past, Serbian and Byzantine, which he knew well and brought into his painting spiritually. He often copied murals from our medieval churches and monasteries that he exhibited in London and Paris. He was a very popular portrait painter and often expressed himself in that genre. Basically, his stylistic development ranged from moderate constructivism, through neo-classicism to cool, monochrome colorism. It is a very special and distinguished phenomenon in Serbian painting between the two world wars.

Pomorišac is Serbia's first painter to paint on glass. Of his many works of this kind, which he produced before Belgrade became a victim of Axis and Allied bombing in World War II, only pieces that remained are the stained glass in the Old Palace and the Metropol Hotel.

He is the author of a banknote, issued by the National Bank of Yugoslavia, of 100 dinars, dated July 15, 1934, and of 1,000 dinars, dated September 6, 1935, which was not put into circulation. Both notes feature compositions inspired by national history. He is also the author of 1,000 dinars banknote, man and woman in national costume, with many details and symbols, but of a dark color, bearing the date of May 1, 1942, published by the Serbian National Bank, during the period of Nazi occupation.

== Solo exhibitions ==
- 1926 Men's gymnasium hall, Novi Sad
- 1927 Art Friends' Salon, Cvijeta Zuzorić Pavilion, Belgrade
- 1937 Galerie Le Niveau, Paris
- 1939 Galerie Contemporaine, Paris
- 1953 Art Pavilion, (retrospective exhibition), Belgrade
- 1954 City Museum, Zrenjanin, Higher Mixed High School, Šabac
- 1956 Novi Sad
- 1959 High School, Svetozarevo, Art Pavilion, Podgorica
- 1960 Hall of the Peoples Committee, Uzice
- 1970 - 1971 Gallery of the Cultural Center (retrospective exhibition), Belgrade
- 1981 Small art salon, Novi Sad
- 1982 National Museum, Belgrade
- 1983 Gallery of the Center for Culture "Olga Petrov", Pančevo
- 1987 Museum of Contemporary Art, Belgrade (retrospective exhibition)

== Art criticism ==
- 1927 Painter Stevan Aleksić, Raška, vol. I, no. 56, Belgrade
- 1927 Živorad Nastasijević's Art Exhibition, Literary Criticism, December 2, no. 1. p. 4-5, Belgrade
- 1928 Stjepan Baković Exhibition, Literary Criticism, January 2, no. 2-3. p. 5, Belgrade
- 1928 Ljubomir Ivanović Exhibition, "Lade", Life and Work, April, vol. And, Vol. 3. p. 324-236, Belgrade
- 1928 Ivan Radović, Life and Work, April, vol. And, Vol. 4. p. 313-314, Belgrade
- 1928 The Crisis of our Fine Arts, Matica Srpska Yearbook, May, vol. CII, Vol. 316, Vol. 2. p. 259-263, Novi Sad
- 1928 Exhibition of Sculptures in Engraving by Risto Stijović, Life and Work, June, vol. And, Vol. 6. p. 478-479, Belgrade
- 1928 Our Glory Uroš Predić, Banatski glasnik, vol. II, no. 6-8, Zrenjanin
- 1929 About Our Medieval Art, Radio Belgrade, May, Belgrade
- 1929 Our Art Events - After the Autumn Exhibition at the Cvijeta Zuzorić Salon, Social Renewal, September 17, Vol. I, no. 2, s, 11-12, Belgrade
- 1930 Two significant exhibitions, Social Renewal, February 2, vol. II, no. 5. p. 12-13, Belgrade
- 1930 II Spring Exhibition of Yugoslav Artists at the Art Pavilion, Belgrade Municipal Gazette, June 25, vol. XLVIII, iss. 13. p. 666-670, Belgrade
- 1930 Great Russian Exhibition, Social Renewal, February, no. 13. p. 12-13, Belgrade
- 1933 How to Look at a Work of Art, Kolarac National University, February, Belgrade
- 1953 Mosaic, Mosaic, September–October, vol. I, no. 1, Belgrade

== Bibliography ==
- 1925 Mihailo S. Petrov, Painter Pomorišac, Vreme, October 8, Belgrade
- 1926 Rade Drainac, Pomorišac, Vidovdan, 6 January, Belgrade
- 1926 Todor Manojlović, Exhibition of paintings by Vasa Pomorisc, Matica Srpska Yearbook, March, Vol. 307, Vol. 3. p. 291-298, Belgrade
- 1927 Milan Kašanin, Exhibitions in April, Serbian Literary Gazette, May 1, Vol. XXI, iss. 1. p. 61-64, Belgrade
- 1927 Sreten Stojanović, Exhibition of Works by Vas Pomorišc, Misao, Belgrade, 1-16. May, Vol. XXIV, Vol. 1-2. p. 104-106, Belgrade
- 1929 Branko Popović, Autumn Exhibition of Belgrade Artists, Serbian Literary Gazette, 16 February, Vol. XXVI, No. 4. p. 298-305, Belgrade
- 1931 Rastko Petrović (N. J.), Spring Exhibition of Yugoslav Artists - Painting, Politics, May 11, Belgrade
- 1933 Dragan Aleksić, Exhibition of the Art Group "Zograf", Vreme, March 21, Belgrade
- 1933 Rastko Petrović (N. J.), Zograf Artists at the Art Pavilion, Politika, March 22, Belgrade
- 1933 Todor Manojlović, Zograf Exhibition, Serbian Literary Gazette, April 1, Vol. XXXVIII, No. 7. p. 548-549, Belgrade
- 1934 Dragan Aleksić, Sixth Spring Exhibition of Painters and Sculptors, Time, May 25, Belgrade
- 1935 Rastko Petrović (N. J.), Seventh Spring Exhibition, Politika, May 23, Belgrade
- 1953 Aleksa Čelebonović, Painting of Your Maritime, Borba, November 15, Belgrade
- 1953 Miodrag B. Protić, Exhibition of Your Maritime Office, NIN, November 22, Belgrade
- 1956 Lazar Trifunovic, Constructivism in Serbian Modern Painting, Delo, June, no. 6. p. 727-734, Belgrade
- 1958 Pavle Vasić, Art Groups in Serbia, Art, vol. II, no. 10. p. 10, Zagreb
- 1964 Miodrag B. Protić, Vasa Pomorišac, Contemporaries II. p. 79-85, Nolit, Belgrade
- 1968 Ješa Denegri, Forms of non-figuration in contemporary painting in Serbia, Life of Art, no. 7-8. p. 17-35, Zagreb
- 1968 Pavle Vasić, Constructive Painting, Politics, January 26, Belgrade
- 1969 Lazar Trifunović, Old and New Art. The Idea of the Past in Modern Art, Zograf, The Fresco Gallery, no. 3. p. 39-52, Belgrade
- 1970 Miodrag B. Protić, Vasa Pomorišac, Serbian Painting of the HH Century. p. 130-133, Nolit, Belgrade
- 1970 Vasilije B. Sujić, (cat. Retrospective exhibitions), Gallery of the Cultural Center, Belgrade
- 1970 Pavle Vasić, The Unknown Vasa Pomorisac, Politika, December 28, Belgrade
- 1973 Miodrag B. Protić, Yugoslav Painting 1900-1950, BIGZ, Belgrade
- 1973 Lazar Trifunović, Serbian Painting 1900-1950, Nolit, Belgrade
- 1982 Nikola Kusovac, Vasa Pomorišac, (cat. Cat.), National Museum, Belgrade
- 1982 Lazar Trifunović, Abstract Painting in Serbia. From Impressionism to Enformel, Nolit. p. 33-41, Belgrade
- 1982 Jovan Despotović, On the Road to the Top. Vasa Pomorišac's Early Works, Politika Express, August 8, Belgrade
- 1986 - 1987 Ljiljana Slijepčević, Vasa Pomorišac 1893-1961, (cat. Retrospective exhibitions, Museum of Contemporary Art, Belgrade

== See also ==
- List of painters from Serbia
- Serbian art
