= Miloš Golubović =

Serbian artist (1888–1961)

Miloš Golubović (Kragujevac, 31 March 1888 — Belgrade 21 May 1961) was a Serbian artist, who during the Great War, was already an accomplished and acclaimed painter.

== Biography ==
Miloš Golubović was born on 31 March 1888 in Kragujevac, Kingdom of Serbia (now Serbia). He finished elementary and grammar school in Belgrade.

He worked as an apprentice with the painter Nikola Milojević. In 1903 he enrolled in the Art School in Belgrade, where he studied painting with Rista Vukanović and Marko Murat, and subsequently, in 1908, although he was among the most talented students, he completed the School of Arts and Crafts. In the meantime, he first traveled to Vienna in 1904, then to Budapest and from 1905 to 1907 resided in Munich and then in Lausanne. He attended the Stroganov Moscow State Academy of Arts and Industry in 1909. He continued his art education in 1910 and 1911 in the Academy of Fine Arts in Prague.

Then he suddenly returned to Belgrade, where he opened his first solo exhibition at the Civic Casino in 1912. After a brief period in the Second Balkan War, he returned to Lausanne again in 1913, where he made his living by painting portraits and cooking. He spent the Great War first on the front and then as a war painter under the Supreme Command. He participated with Kosta Miličević, Živorad Nastasijević and Stevan Milosavljević at the "Exhibition of War Painters of the Supreme Command", which was held with great success at the "King Peter I Public School" near the Cathedral Church in Belgrade in 1919. He then resided in Paris from 1919 to 1920. From 1920 he was employed by the Evening Arts and Crafts School in Belgrade, then as a professor of drawing at the Commerce Academy, the Secondary Technical School, and the Art School. From 1945 until his retirement in 1955 he was a professor at the XIV Men's Gymnasium in Belgrade.

He was a member of the Medulić Society, one of the founders of the "Association of Fine Artists" (ULUS) in 1919, the Association of Serbian-Croatian Artists "Lada" (1920 to 1922, and since 1927), and in 1922 he became a member of the Main Board of the Association of Yugoslav Artists in Zagreb. In 1939 he was one of the founders of the Association of War Painters and Sculptors in 1912 to 1918 in Belgrade.

== See also ==
- List of painters from Serbia
