= 1300 Corporals =

Serbian military unit

Student Battalion
- ђачки батаљон đački bataljon
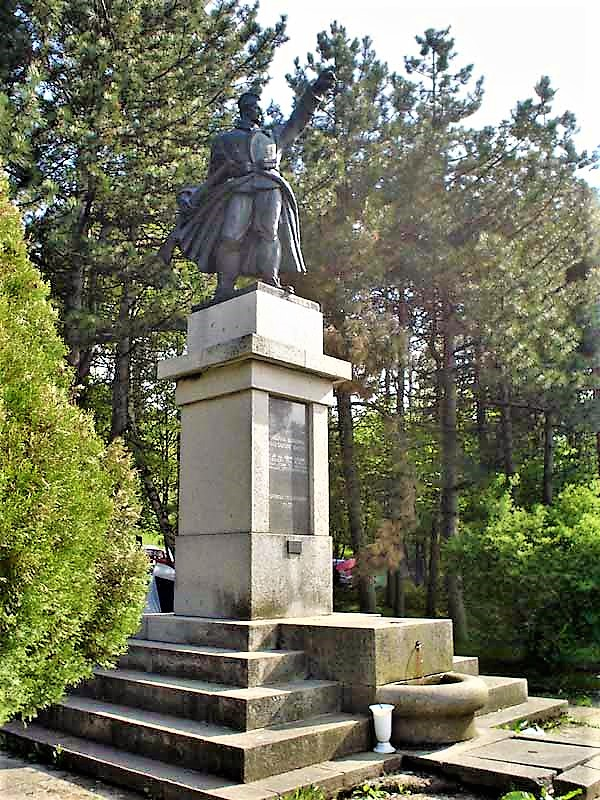
- Monument on Mount Rajac, part of Suvobor.
- Active: September 1914–1918
- Country: Kingdom of Serbia
- Allegiance: Serbia (Allies)
- Type: infantry
- Size: 1,300
- Nickname: 1300 Corporals

The Student Battalion (Serbian: ђачки батаљон, romanized: đački bataljon), known as the 1300 corporals (1300 каплара), was a volunteer unit of the Royal Serbian Army made up of students that were sent as reinforcement to the Serbian First Army in World War I. They notably participated at the Battle of Kolubara.

== Background ==
The Serbian victory at the Battle of Cer came at a cost with losses of officers and sub-officers, with the command cadre already weakened by the Balkan Wars. In order to replenish the officer ranks, the Serbian High Command decided that all students eligible for military service be called for military training in Skopje. These students were in high school or alumni of gymnasiums, as well as European universities. Some students had already joined as volunteers on the front, and were also called to training in Skopje. They were to support the units at the front that had great losses and had lost faith in a victory.

On 14 September 1914 youngsters of several generations down to birth year 1893 began physical examination, and were then organized into a "Student company" (ђачка чета). The numbers rose in the coming days to around 1,300, and a "Student battalion" was established, with initially five companies of more than 200 each, and a later sixth with European students. They swore Oath in front of general Damjan Popović, potpukovnik Dušan Glišić, Metropolitan Vićentije Krdžić and other officers at the field with an artillery barracks. They danced the kolo and Popović was enthusiastic, claiming that almost a third of the students had already gained experience fighting in the Balkan Wars. Most of the students came from the University of Belgrade, and there were also 300 recently finished teachers. Infantry potpukovnik Glišić was tasked with quickly training the students and sending them to the front.

The battalion was organized into six companies:

- 1st, called Plemići, made up mostly of students from Valjevo and Užice
- 2nd, called Bukvarci, made up of agricultural students from Niš, Toplica and Vranje
- 3rd, called Rmpalije, made up mostly of students from Šumadija
- 4th, called Ruzmarini, made up of students from University of Belgrade
- 5th, called Ćevabdžije, made up of students from newly acquired provinces of Serbia and Montenegro, and Austria-Hungary
- 6th, called Kalašture, made up of students in Europe

The Serbian High Command gave the rank kaplar/podnarednik, the lowest sub-officer rank, to all members of the battalion on 15 November 1914. In January 1915 ranks were elevated to đak-narednik and on 25 October 1915 the rank reserve potporučnik.

The Student Battalion defended Serbia at the end of 1915, retreated through Albania, died on Vido and on the Salonica Front. Some members were retired following the war with the rank reserve infantry poručnik.

== Battle ==
During 1916 and 1917, a group of around 500 corporals were in Jausiers, France, for military training, from where they returned to the front.

== Legacy ==
The "1300 corporals" symbolize a battle for freedom of their country and people, mainly because most of them were youngsters who went into the battle on their own initiative.

== Notable people ==
- Aleksandar Deroko, architect
- Aleksandar Cincar-Marković, later statesman
- Bogoljub Jeftić, later statesman
- Božidar Purić, later statesman
- Vojislav Radovanović, geographer
- Dobrivoje Pandurović, engineer
- Ivan Subotić, diplomat
- Tadija Pejović, mathematician
- Lazar Pijade, industrialist
- Tanasije Aritonović, engineer
- Milutin Stefanović, journalist
- Mihailo Obradović, economic
- Nikola Bešević, painter
- Petar Micić, educator
- Stanislav Vinaver, writer
- Živorad Nastasijević, painter
- Miloš Golubović, painter

== Sources ==
- Lukić, Aleksandar; Kojić, Miroslava (2014). УЧЕШЋЕ 1300 ЂАКА КАПЛАРА У КОЛУБАРСКОЈ БИЦИ. Ljig: Gradska biblioteka Ljig.
- Pećinar, Miladin (1969). Скопски ђачки батаљон 1914: батаљон 1300 каплара. Udruženje 1300 kaplara.
- Životić, Aleksandar (2017). "РАСПОРЕД И ЈАЧИНА СРПСКЕ ВОЈСКЕ У ПОЗАДИНИ СЕПТЕМБРА 1915". Vojnoistorijski glasnik. 2: 103–130.
- Hournac, Roger (2021). "SRPSKI UNIVERZITETSKI BATALJON U ŽOZIJEU (JAUSIERS) 1916–1917. GODINE: U znak sećanja na Miru Pavlović-Urnak". Hereticus. 1–2: 271–285.
