= Ljubomir Ivanović =

Serbian artist

Ljubomir "Ljuba" Ivanović (24 February 1882 – 23 November 1945) was a Serbian painter, printmaker and draughtsman. He is considered one of the first Serbian impressionists, although he found his way of expression through graphic means.

== Biography ==
Ivanović was born in Belgrade, Kingdom of Serbia. After completing his secondary education, Ljubomir Ivanović studied at Kiril Kutlík's Serbian School of Drawing and Painting, and later at the Arts and Crafts School of Beta Vukanović and Risto Vukanović in Belgrade. In 1905, he went to Munich and enrolled at the private painting school of Anton Ažbe, and in the same year the Kunstgewerbeschule.

After his return to the homeland, he was, first, appointed as a teacher in a grammar school. When the war began, Ivanović was mobilized, but because of his poor health, he was made a hospital orderly. He stayed with the Serbian army through most of the retreat, stopped in Prizren in late 1915. After this, he returned to Belgrade. Not surprisingly, he had little time to paint at a time of occupation. There was always that worry of being accused of spying. The wartime painting that he did consists of genre scenes unrelated to the war. He did, however, manage to produce a couple of works, a line drawing entitled "Flight" (Beg) in 1915, that captures the moment of the retreating army, and an equally powerful "Fallen Soldier" from the same period.

After the war, he became a professor of drawing in the Arts and Crafts School in Belgrade. In 1922 he became a member of Serbian Royal Academy (later Serbian Academy of Sciences and Arts).

He traveled through the country and abroad with another artist Vasa Pomorišac and made drawings that were published in several specially edited albums. He was a member of the "Lada" artist's group.

From 1940 to 1945, he was a full-time professor of graphics and printmaking at Academy of Fine Arts in Belgrade.

== Works ==
His works can be found in art galleries and museums throughout the country. Also, Ljubomir Ivanović work can be found in the collection of Milan Jovanović Stojimirović who bequeathed a vast number of paintings, sketches, and artifacts to the Art Department of the Museum in Smederevo.

== See also ==
- List of painters from Serbia
