= Stevan Milosavljević =

Serbian physician and politician

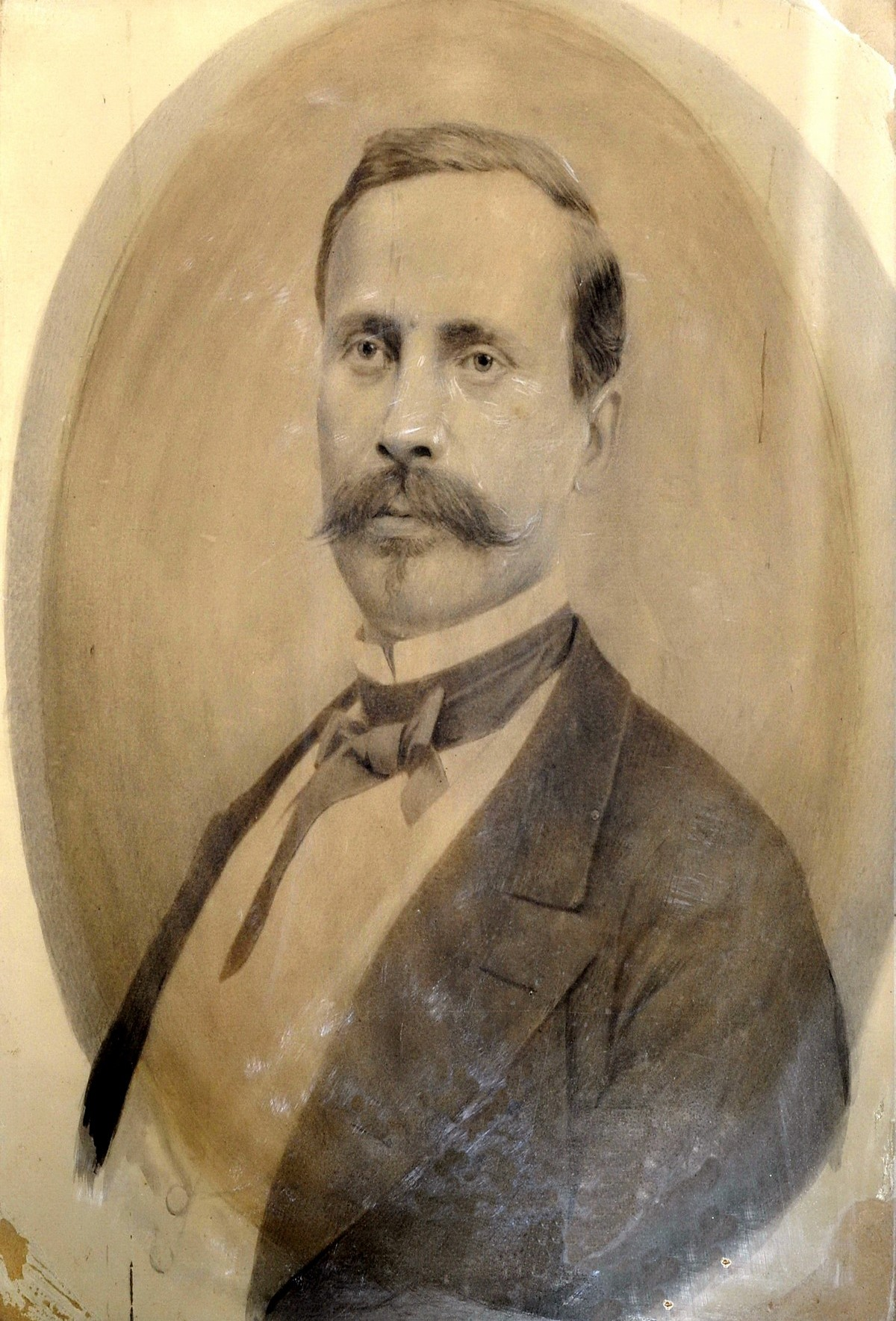
Stevan Milosavljević

Stevan Milosavljević (Belgrade, Principality of Serbia, 18 December 1827 – Vienna, Austria-Hungary, 13 February 1879) was a Serbian medical doctor and politician, who was one of the founders of the Serbian Medical Society.

== Biography ==
Stevan Milosavljević was born in Belgrade on 18 December 1827. He finished primary and secondary school in Belgrade. In early 1850 he went to Paris as a state scholarship holder for medical studies. He finished his medical studies in Paris after five years, on 18 April 1855. The then Ministry of Public Education awarded a diploma to Stevan Milosavljević, declaring him a doctor of medicine.

== Life and work ==
After finishing school, he returned to Serbia, where he opened his practice. He worked as a municipal and private doctor in Belgrade until 1859 when on 1 April Miloš Obrenović appointed Milosavljević by decree head of the Sanitary Department of the Ministry of the Interior. Stevan Milosavljević was the organizer and creator of many sanitary provisions in the sanitary service.

The following were adopted:

- "Rules for grafting smallpox",
- "The highest decision is to establish a Laboratory in the Sanitary Department and the title of a chemist",
- "The highest decision on the duties of district doctors",
- "The highest solution is for municipalities to pay for medical treatment for poor patients",
- "The highest decision is to issue federations of personalities to the poor, officials, priests, servants and students free of charge",
- "Decision on the salary of district physicists",
- "Law on the construction and organization of hospitals",
- "Law on Pharmacies and Pharmacists for Holding and Selling Medicines and Poisons".

He was the head of the Sanitary Department of the Ministry of the Interior until 1879.

In 1870 Stevan Milosavljević was elected councilor of the Municipality of Belgrade, and in 1873 he was elected a government deputy in the National Assembly of the Republic of Serbia. He actively participated in the enactment of laws and discussions on important issues in these bodies.

Stevan Milosavljević participated in the International Medical Congress in Vienna in 1872 and 1874.

In the beginning of 1878, Milosavljević's health began to deteriorate. In April of the same year, he went to Switzerland for treatment and recovery. After a few months, he went to Vienna for further treatment. His condition worsened further and he died on 13 February in Vienna, in the arms of his sisters. He was buried in Belgrade on 21 February 1879.

== Family ==
His father Lazar Milosavljević was a merchant (shopkeeper), born in Sofia, while his mother Simka (née Stefanović) was originally from Belgrade. She was one of three sisters (Magdalena and Savka).

Milosavljević's sister, Savka Panić, in order to preserve the memory of her brother, founded the "Endowment of Dr. Steva Milosavljević, the first Serbian chief of medical services" and bequeathed the Serbian Medical Society her property. The purpose of the will was to raise the Medical Home, which was achieved in 1932.
