= Zastava 1300 =

Zastava 1300 may refer to one of two automobiles:

- A version of the Fiat 1300 and 1500
- A version of the Zastava Skala
