= Jaša Tomić, Sečanj =

Jaša Tomić Јаша Томић (Serbian) Módos (Hungarian)
- Village (Selo)
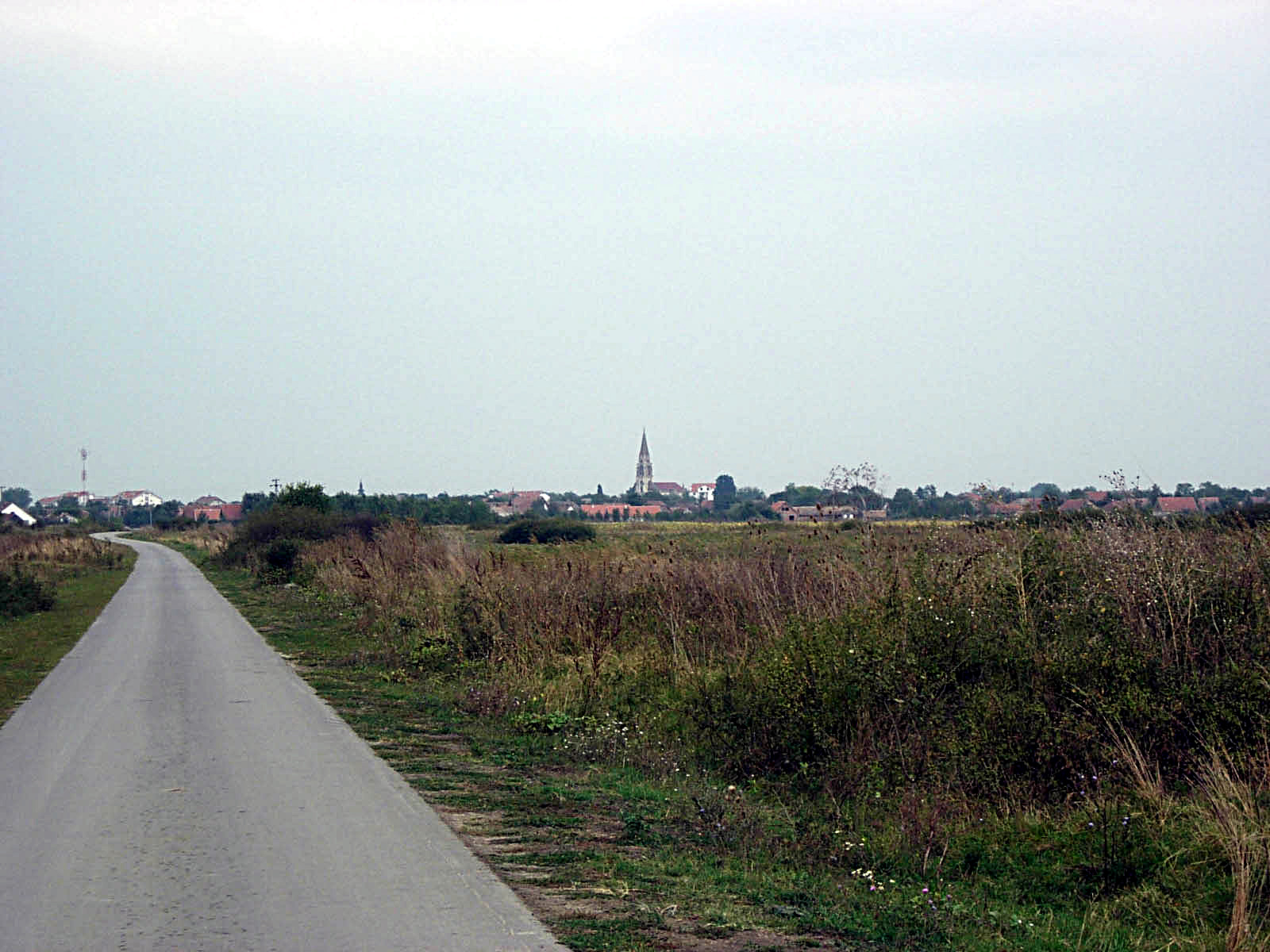
- Jaša Tomić, panoramic view

- Location within Serbia Jaša Tomić (Serbia) Jaša Tomić (Europe)
- Coordinates: 45°26′29″N 20°51′11″E
- Country: Serbia
- Province: Vojvodina
- District: Central Banat
- Municipalities: Sečanj
- Elevation: 52 m (171 ft)

Population (2002)
  - Jaša Tomić: 2,982
- Time zone: UTC+1 (CET)
  - Summer (DST): UTC+2 (CEST)
- Postal code: 23230
- Area code: +381(0)23
- Car plates: ZR

Jaša Tomić (Serbian Cyrillic: Јаша Томић) is a town located in the municipality of Sečanj, in the Central Banat District of Serbia. It is situated in the Autonomous Province of Vojvodina. The town has a Serb ethnic majority and a population numbering 2,982 people (2002 census).

== Name ==
The town is named after Jaša Tomić (1856–1922), a Serb journalist and politician from Vojvodina. In Serbian Cyrillic, the town is known as Јаша Томић, in Serbian Latin Jaša Tomić, in Croatian as Modoš, in German as Modosch, in Hungarian as Módos, in Romanian as Modoș, and in Banat Bulgarian as Modoš. The former name for the town used in Serbian was Modoš (Модош) as well. It is assumed that the old village name, Modoš, derived from the Latin phrase modus transciendi, which in English means way of crossing the river.

== History ==
The oldest known settlements in this area date from the 3rd and 2nd millennia BC. Findings from the Neolithic, Bronze and Iron Ages have been found, including a burial from the Bosut-Basarabi culture of the 9th century BC. The area contains archaeological traces of Celts, Thracians, Romans, Avars and Slavs. Topographic names of Slavic origin found in the area, such as the Grešara, Mlaka, Margitica, Kamenica, Livade, Selište, Rasove, Vagan, Bavanište, etc., testify that the area was inhabited by Slavs from the 5th century onwards.

Historically, the first written mention was in 1334 as Madus. At that time the village was administered by the Kingdom of Hungary and peopled with Catholic Hungarians. In 1338 the settlement was mentioned as Modos and in 1344 as Modoš. Settlement was part of the Kovin county. Two other medieval settlements existed nearby: Új Rév (Uj Rev, Oređ) and Oroszi (Orosi). Oroszi was populated by Russians who had been captured by the Hungarians at the battle of Kiev.

In 1552, Modoš became part of the Ottoman Empire, administratively included in the Province of Temeşvar. With the Ottoman conquest, most of the local Hungarian population left for the north and the Ottoman authorities brought in Serbs in their place. Thus Modoš under the Ottoman administration was populated by ethnic Serbs and divided into two settlements - Veliki Modoš and Mali Modoš. In 1660–6, Katastig of the Patriarchal Monastery of Peć recorded the names of Serb inhabitants of Modoš - priest Jaftimije and priest Zaharije, Ilija, Granny Romana, Milić Radojević, Vladislav, Rusmir, Vuja, Komlenija, Avram, Gavril Panov, Mata, Radomir, Cveja Vranešev, Andreja, and Petar.

In 1717, Modoš became part of the Habsburg monarchy, and contained 50 houses, inhabited by Serbs. Until 1778, it belonged administratively to the Banat of Temeschwar and to the district of Betschkerek (Serbian: Bečkerek). A new Orthodox church was built in Modoš in 1746, to replace an earlier mentioned during the Serbian Patriarch Kalinik I (1691–1710). In the second half of the 18th century, some Serbs from Pomorišje and Sečanj settled in Modoš, as did some Hungarians, Germans, Slovaks and Bulgarians. The first German settlers arrived in 1766, followed by others in 1784 and 1792. In 1779, after abolition of the Banat of Temeswar, Modoš was included in Torontal County, which was part of the Habsburg Kingdom of Hungary. Some local Serbs who were dissatisfied with this administrative change left Modoš and settled in the Banatian Military Frontier. In the end of the 18th century, Modoš was politically divided into two settlements - Serbian Modoš and German Modoš. In 1795 a Catholic church was built.

In 1836, the population of Modoš numbered 3560, of whom 2440 were Orthodox Christians, 1116 Roman Catholics, and 4 Evangelicals (Lutherans). In 1842, Serbian prince Mihajlo Obrenović stayed in Modoš, during his trip from Principality of Serbia to Vienna. In 1848, Torontal County was administratively divided into three districts, one of which had its administrative seat in Modoš. In 1848–9, Modoš was part of the autonomous Serbian Vojvodina and in 1849-60 of the Voivodeship of Serbia and Temes Banat, a separate Habsburg crown land. After abolition of the Voivodeship in 1860, Modoš was again included in Torontal County.

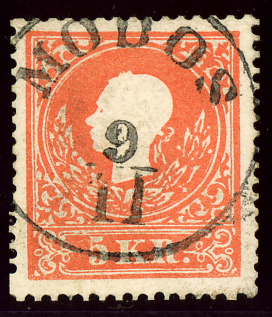
Austria KK stamp of 1858 cancelled at Modos / Modoš

During the 1860s, the ethnic structure changed as some Serbs left and some Germans from Bačka settled there instead. In 1876, a Serb reading house was founded in the settlement. In 1895, Serbian Modoš and German Modoš were joined into a single political unit. By 1910, the population of the town was ethnically mixed, the largest group being the Germans, alongside sizeable Hungarian and Serb communities.

In November 1918, the army of the Kingdom of Serbia entered Modoš, which became part of the Banat, Bačka and Baranja region, first of the Kingdom of Serbia and then of the Kingdom of Serbs, Croats and Slovenes (renamed to Yugoslavia in 1929). In 1918–19, it was part of the Veliki Bečkerek County within the Kingdom. However, in July 1919, the town was assigned to Romania. In 1924, the town, together with a few other settlements, was returned to the SCS Kingdom in exchange for the town of Jimbolia and a few other settlements, which were transferred to Romania. In the same year (1924), the name of the town was changed to Jaša Tomić. From 1924 to 1929 it was part of Podunavlje Oblast with its administrative seat in Smederevo, and from 1929 to 1941 part of Danube Banovina, with its administrative seat in Novi Sad. From 1941 to 1944, it was under Axis occupation and was included in the German-administered region of Banat, which formally was part of Serbia.

In 1944, Jaša Tomić became part of the autonomous province of Vojvodina within the new socialist Yugoslavia. In 1945, Vojvodina became part of the People's Republic of Serbia within Yugoslavia. The German population had mostly fled from Jaša Tomić by the end of the war (in 1944), while some mainly Serb colonists from Bosnia and Herzegovina, Central Serbia and Croatia settled in the town from 1945. Post-war population censuses recorded a Serb ethnic majority in the town. Until the 1950s, Jaša Tomić was the seat of the municipality, but in 1955 this municipality was abolished and the town became part of the municipality of Zrenjanin. Later a separate municipality of Sečanj was formed and town of Jaša Tomić was included into this municipality. However, even today Jaša Tomić is the largest settlement in the Sečanj municipality and the only settlement in the municipality with town status, Sečanj, its seat, being only a village. In 2005, the town was devastated by floods.

== Demographics ==
Historical population
Year	Pop.	±%
1869	4,272	—
1900	4,614	+8.0%
1921	4,750	+2.9%
1948	4,378	−7.8%
1953	4,569	+4.4%
1961	4,420	−3.3%
1971	3,831	−13.3%
1981	3,625	−5.4%
1991	3,544	−2.2%
2002	3,131	−11.7%
2011	2,382	−23.9%

=== Ethnic groups (2002 census) ===
- Serbs = 2,126 (71.29%)
- Hungarians = 251 (8.42%)
- Romani = 142 (4.76%)
- Yugoslavs = 125 (4.19%)
- Bulgarians = 29 (0.97%)
- Macedonians = 11 (0.37%)
- Croats = 10 (0.34%)
- others.

== Notable citizens ==
- Stevan Aleksić, a famous Serbian painter, lived and worked.
- Marta Savić, singer

== See also ==
- List of places in Serbia
- List of cities, towns and villages in Vojvodina

== Gallery ==
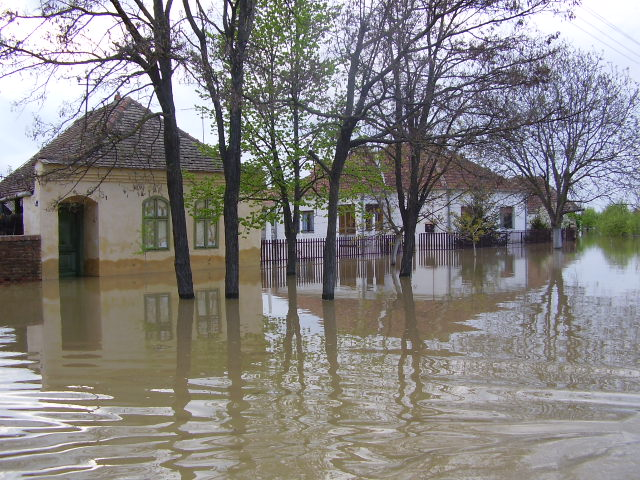
Flood in Jaša Tomić in 2005

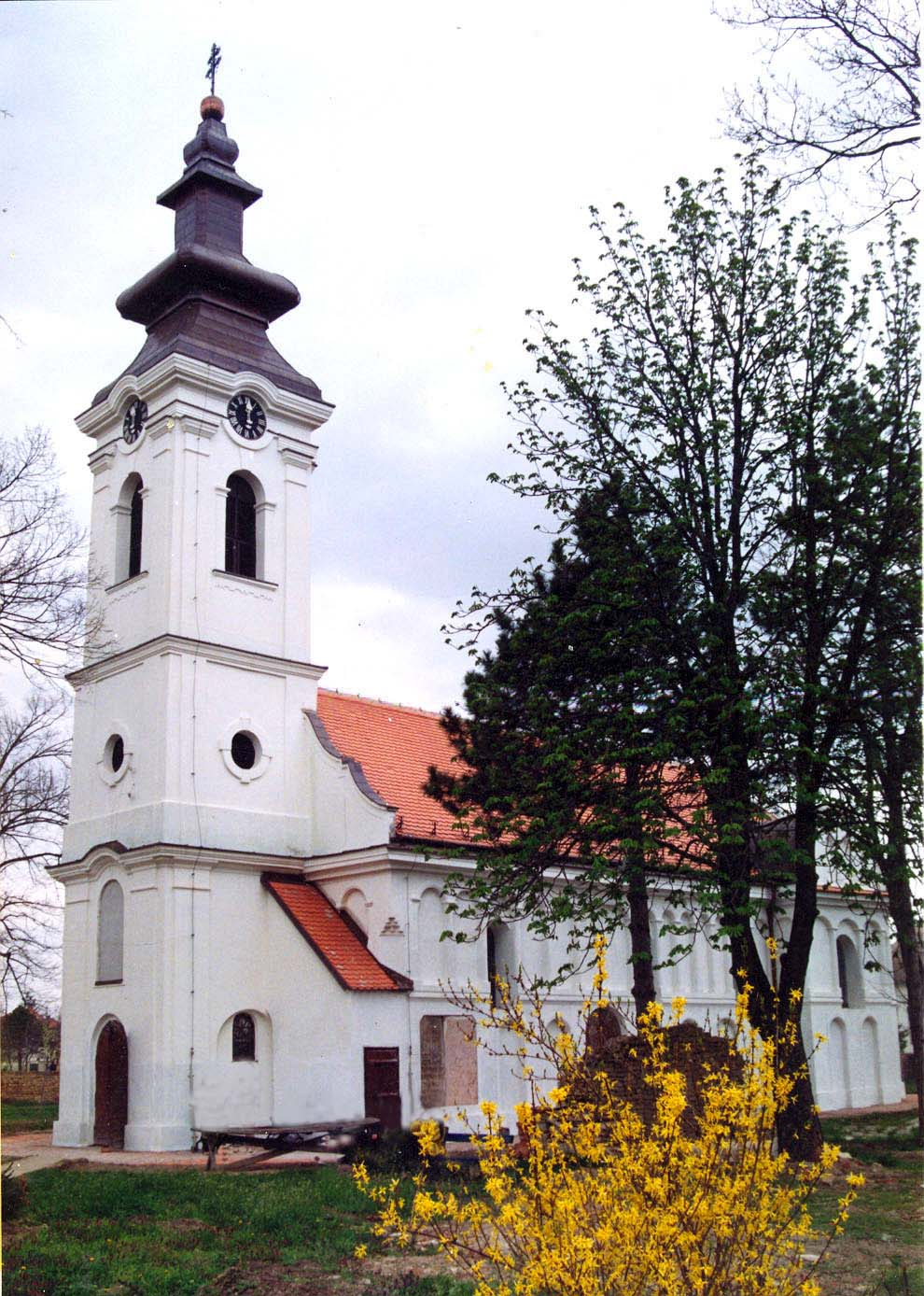
The Orthodox church

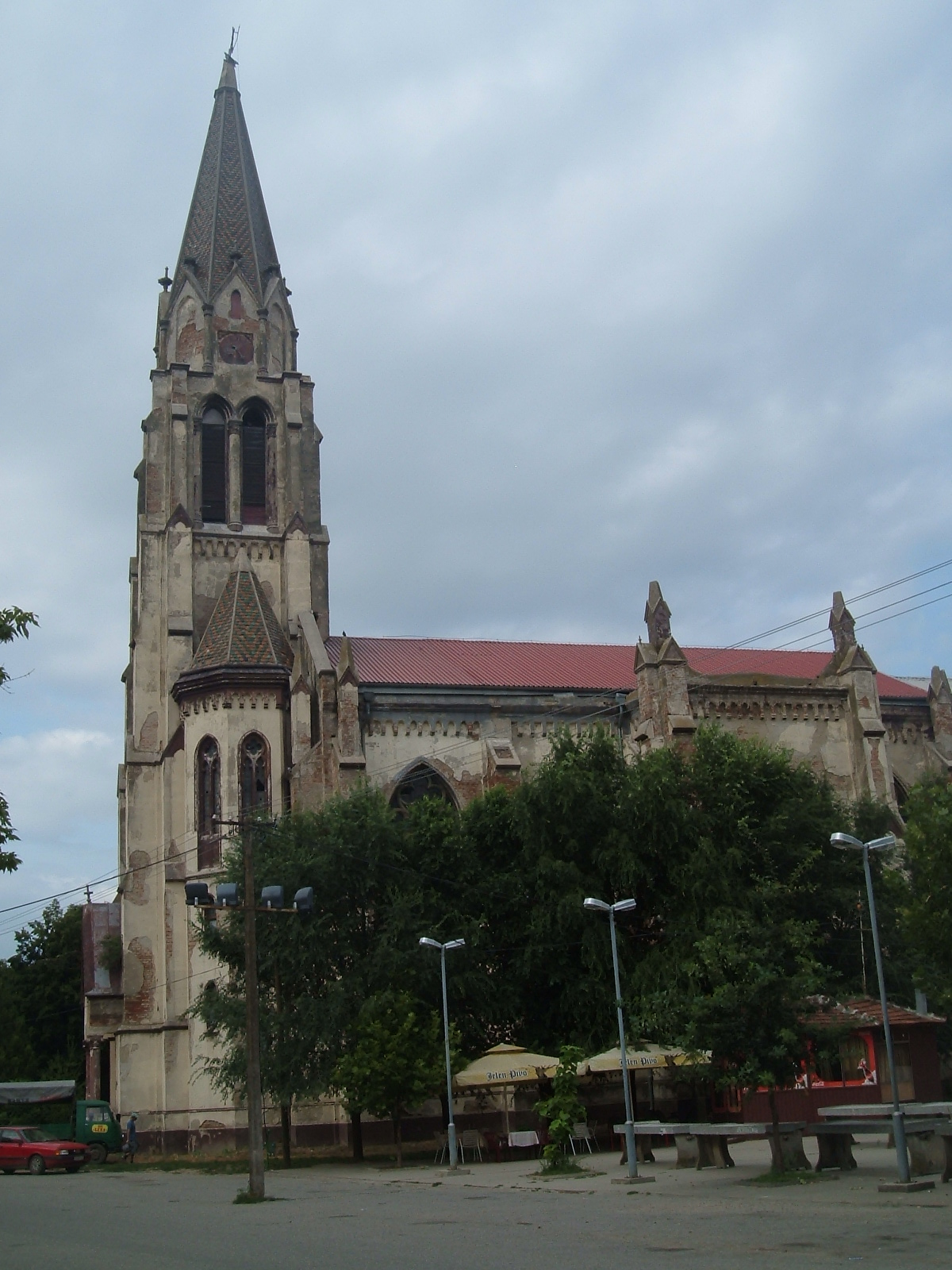
The Ascension of the Blessed Virgin Mary Catholic church
