= Branko Popović (painter) =

Serbian painter and Renaissance man

- Бранко Поповић
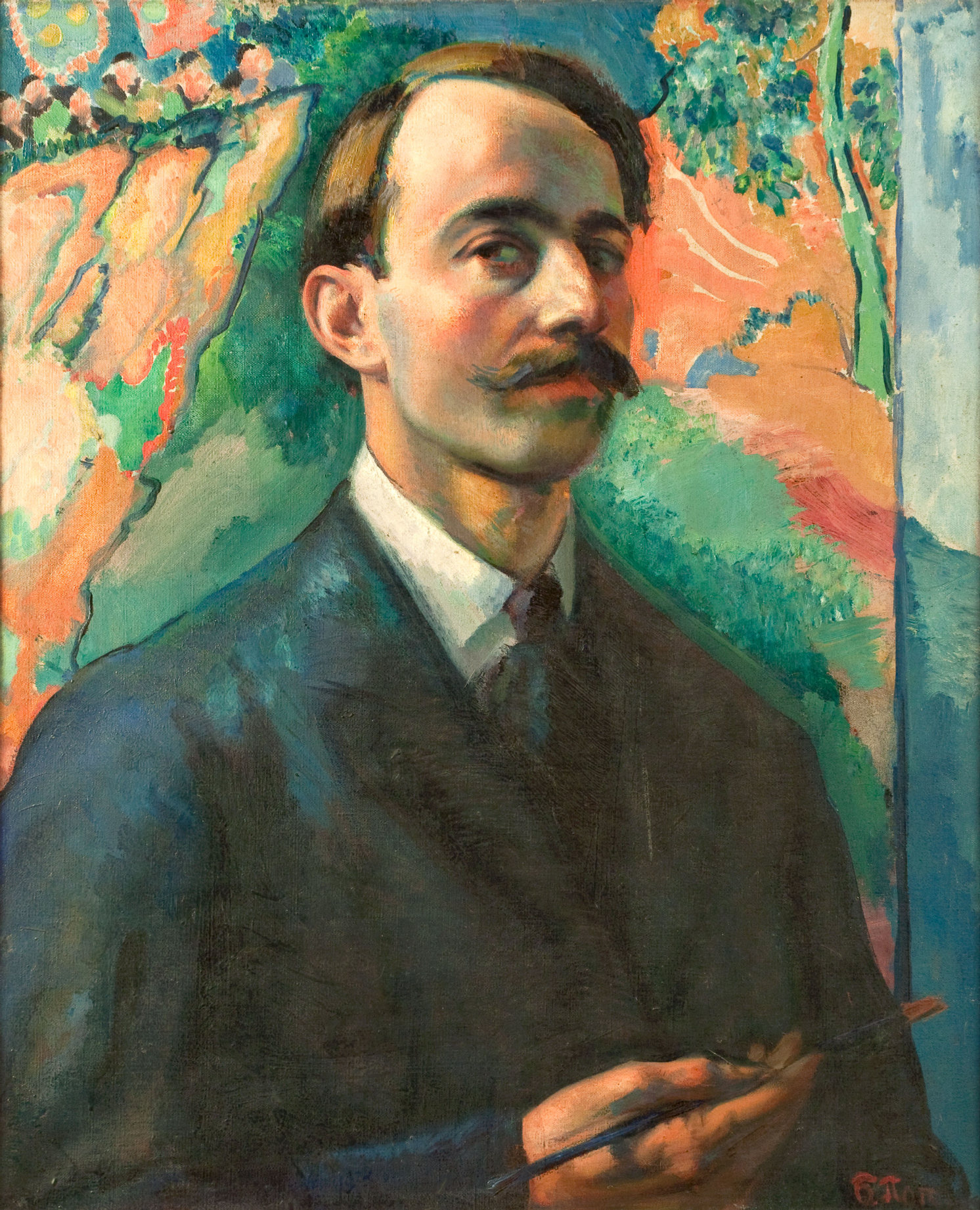
- Self portrait (1912)
- Born: 15 January 1882; Užice, Principality of Serbia
- Died: 27 November 1944 (aged 62); Belgrade, DF Yugoslavia
- Occupations: painter, art critic, professor

Branko Popović (15 January 1882 – 27 November 1944) was a Serbian painter, art critic, professor and dean of the Engineering Faculty at the University of Belgrade. He was also an accomplished architect.

== Biography ==
He was born in Užice to Femka and Stojan Popović, founder of the first blanket factory in Užice. While still a young man, Branko Popović entered Belgrade's public and artistic life. When the First Yugoslav Art Exhibition was held in 1904, he was chosen as a member of the Exhibition Committee. Among the members of that committee, there were many distinguished Serbian scholars and artists such as Mihailo Valtrović, Miloje Vasić, Marko Leko, Jovan Cvijić, Đoka Jovanović and Steva Todorović. The choice of Branko Popović as a member of the Exhibition's Committee was a great honor for him given that he was so young, only 22.

Branko graduated from the Faculty of Engineering in Belgrade in 1905. He then studied painting in Munich at the Heinrich Knirr Drawing School (1905–1906), then at the Art Academy of Ludwig von Herterich (1906–1909) and in Paris (1909–1912). He painted about 100 pieces, 80 of which are preserved. Art critics wrote about his paintings while Branko Popović himself, as a critic, interpreted and evaluated the work of virtually all the artists who were active in Belgrade and the Kingdom of Yugoslavia at the time. He published many reviews, essays, and studies on art. He was one of the founders of the Art group Oblik. He also exhibited at joint exhibitions in Paris (1919), Philadelphia (1926), Barcelona (1928), London (1930), Rome (1937) and at the 22nd Venice Biennale (1940).

He participated in the Balkan Wars, was wounded at Kumanovo, and also participated in the Great War. As an officer of the VII Infantry Regiment, he received the rank of lieutenant colonel. He was awarded the Medal for Bravery (1912) in the First Balkan War and a Medal for Bravery for the Second Balkan War and the French Cross of the Legion of Honour with palm trees in World War I. He was elected assistant professor at the faculty of engineering in 1914. He was an architect and between two wars one of the most famous Serbian painters. On the eve of World War II, he was dean of the faculty of engineering in Belgrade.

Also, Popović was a member of the Democratic Party. After the Nazi invasion and the breakup of Yugoslavia, he was imprisoned and sent to Banjica concentration camp as an advocate for democracy. He managed to get out and return to the position of Dean of the Faculty of Engineering. He refused to be a signatory of the Appeal to the Serbian people, for which he was later charged by the Communists. He participated in the drafting of the Srpski civilni plan nacionalnog preporoda (Serbian Civilian Plan of National Revival) with other Serbian intellectuals, notably Veselin Čajkanović, S. Stefanović, N. Popović, and others.

Branko Popović's life came to a sudden and immediate end after the liberation of Belgrade in November 1944, when the Military Tribunal of the National Liberation Army sentenced him to death, and it is not known where he was buried. On that occasion, the Belgrade dailies Politika and Borba published on 27 November 1944 a list of 105 names of people executed, including Branko's. Popović's family, however, never received any official document stipulating that there was a trial or conviction in his case. His entire assets were confiscated by the communists. Painter Đorđe Andrejević-Kun moved into his apartment and studio at Knez Mihailova 24.

In 2007, following a ruling by the Belgrade District Court, he was rehabilitated. Exhibitions of his works were organized: 1996 in Belgrade (at the SANU Gallery), 1996 in Novi Sad (at the art salon of the SANU branch), 2004 in Uzice (at the City Gallery) and 2011, on February 10, 2011, at the RTS Gallery and in Zrenjanin at the National Museum, August 25, 2011.

== Personal life ==
He was married to Divna, née Naunović, with whom he had three sons: Simeon, an architect, Prijezda, a lawyer, and Borivoje, a TV journalist.

== Works ==
- Branko Popović (1882–1944), autoportrait from 1912.
- Portrait of Divna (B. Popović's wife) from 1925.
- Branko Popović: Devojka u prirodi (The Girl in Nature, 1910).
- Branko Popović: Dr. X (1912).
- Branko Popović: Akt.
- Branko Popović: Korčula u Dalmacijičula in Dalmatia, 1925–1926).
- Branko Popović: Manastir Sveti Naum (St. Naum Monastery, 1931).

== See also ==
- List of Serbian painters
- List of Serbian architects
