= Nikola Milojević (painter) =

Serbian portraitist and photographer (1865–1942)

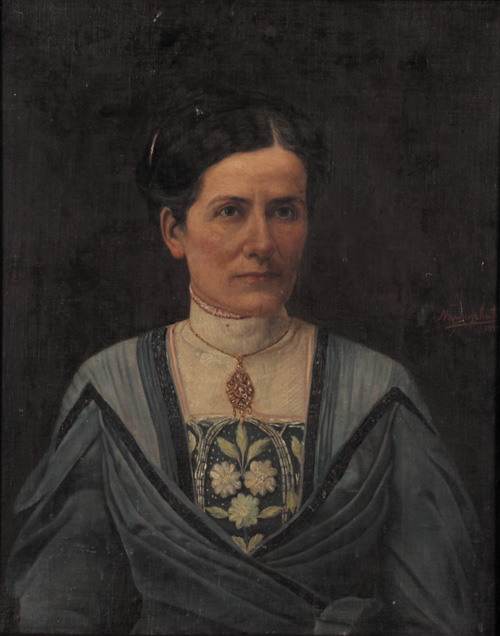
Image of Nikola Milojević

Nikola Milojević (Serbian: Никола Милојевић; Jagodina, Principality of Serbia, 6 May 1865 – Belgrade, Serbia, Kingdom of Yugoslavia under occupation, 7 March 1942) was one of the most prolific Serbian portraitists of his generation. He was also a popular Belgrade studio photographer, a representative of academic realism of the 19th century along with many of his colleagues.

== Birth ==
He was born in Jagodina, Serbia on 6 May 1865, to father Teodor, a merchant craftsman, and mother Milica. He lost his father early in his childhood, and his mother had to take care of him and three other siblings. Faced with scarcity and poverty, the remaining three children died. However, Milica managed to enable Nikola to finish his elementary and high school education in Jagodina. Young Nikola then moved to Belgrade, where his uncle took care of him and gave him a job with a Belgrade merchant Jefta Pavlović. In Pavlović's office supplies store, Nikola became fascinated with the accessories for drawing and painting and there and then he decided to become an artist. Even early on, his talent showed promise and his first portraits came to the fore and were immediately noticed. In the following years, he continued to work for the merchant Pavlović and at the same time devoted himself to learning and training as an artist. He participated as a volunteer in the Serbian-Bulgarian War in 1885. That period left him deeply and permanently marked for life, which would later reflect in his work.

== Education and work ==
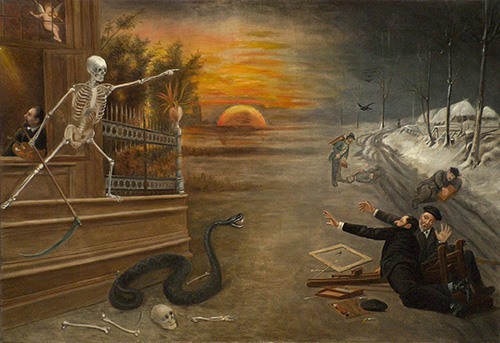
Nikola Milojević – Umetnička pakost, c. 1905

In 1891, he enrolled at the Royal Academy of Fine Arts in Vienna, thanks to the merchant Pavlović and his brother (Mihajlo) and son (Milorad) who became his benefactors. Nikola was recalled to Serbia just before graduating. Upon returning to Belgrade as an academically-trained artist, he opened his own studio in the popular district of Knez Mihailova Street and soon became one of the most sought-after portraitists of the Belgrade middle-class. He participated in Serbian and foreign painting exhibitions, where he was awarded commendations and diplomas. He used the majolica technique and brown toner. At the same time, he provided photographic services to citizens in his studio which was also equipped with photographic equipment, thanks to his close associate and colleague Milan Jovanović whose photographic studio was on the same street as his atelier.

== Later days ==
The end of his painting activity was conditioned by the loss of sight, followed by a heart attack from which he did not fully recover. He died on 7 March 1942 in Nazi-occupied Belgrade.

== Works ==
- Self-Portrait, oil on canvas.
- "Hadži Prodan buna" (revolt), oil on canvas.
- "Impailing of Prior Pajsije before the Stambol Gate", oil on canvas.
- "Torture of captive Rebels (1814-1815)".
- Portrait of Architect Rudević.

== Legacy ==
In 1980, the Homeland Museum in Jagodina took over as a gift from the painter Živan Vulić for permanent use of the Legacy of Nikola Milojević, which contains 15 drawings, 1 lithograph and 14 oil paintings. These works were presented to the professional and general public in the same year. In that way, the work of the most important representative of Serbian art of the period continues to live. Apart from being in private possession, Nikola Milojević's works are in the art collections of the National Museum in Belgrade, the Museum of the City of Belgrade, the museum in the Jovan Cvijić's House in Belgrade, the National Museum in Belgrade, the Matica Srpska in Novi Sad, the National Museum at Kraljevo and the Military Museum of Belgrade, where his Portrait of Voivode Živojin Mišić from 1920 is kept.

== See also ==
- List of Serbian painters

== Literature ==
- Painter Nikola Milojević: 1865–1942, Uglješa Rajčević, Belgrade, 1999, COBISS.SR 149154823
