= Ivan Radović =

Serbian-Yugoslavian tennis player and artist

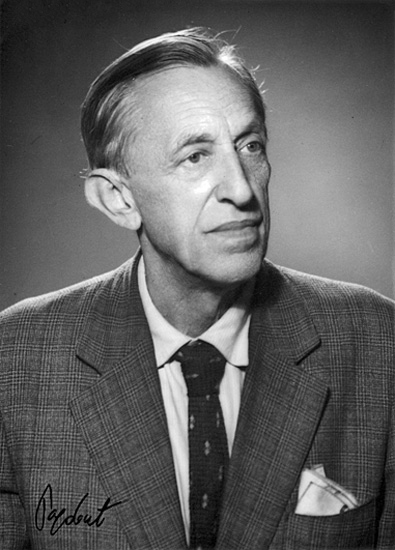
- Ivan Radović, c. 1960s
- Native name: Иван Радовић
- Country (sports): Yugoslavia
- Born: 22 June 1894
- Died: 14 August 1973 (aged 79)

Team competitions
- Davis Cup: Winner (1930); Runner-up (1929)
- Military career
- Allegiance: Yugoslavia
- Service: Royal Yugoslav Army
- Wars: World War II

Ivan Radović (Serbian Cyrillic: Иван Радовић [ǐʋan rǎːdoʋitɕ]; 22 June 1894 – 14 August 1973) was a Serbian-Yugoslav tennis player and painter.

== Early life and education ==
Ivan Radović was born in Vršac and graduated from the Teacher's College in Sombor in 1913, where he finished as a drawing teacher. He taught at a school in Stanišić between 1915-1916. He went to Budapest in order to continue his studies at the Hungarian University of Fine Arts, in the class of Hungarian painter István Réti. He spent his student years in Hungary between 1917 and 1920. He then spent the 1921 school year visiting Munich, Prague, and Venice, and stayed in Prague where he studied art at the Academy of Fine Arts and then went to Paris. Afterwards, he taught at the young girls' high school in Sombor. He moved to Belgrade in 1927. In 1929 he organized his breakthrough third exhibition in the Belgrade Pavilion of Arts, "Cvijeta Zuzorić".

== Tennis career ==
In 1929 Radović participated in the National Championships in Zagreb. The same year, he was ranked third behind Franjo Šefer and Krešimir Friedrich. Thus he was invited onto the Kingdom of Yugoslavia Davis Cup team and travelled to Athens with them to face Greece. The Yugoslavian team lost and Radović remained a reserve player. In 1930 the Yugoslavian squad hosted a first-round match against Sweden and celebrated their first and flawless victory in the Cup. Radović also won in the doubles, partnering Šefer. He retired from the team after the next match against Spain, in which he was defeated in the doubles.

Radović represented his country once more in a friendly match against Hungary in Szeged in June 1930. The team was composed of him and Šefer. Although he lost both of his singles matches, Šefer made it a tie with two victories and they claimed the doubles to close the meeting three to two rubbers. In October he became a Yugoslavian doubles champion, pairing with Šefer, after successfully defeating Emil Gabrowitz of Hungary and compatriot Friedrich in the Belgrade International tournament final. He and Šefer met in the mixed doubles final as well, where the latter teamed with Lili Schräger and beat the duo of Radović and Magda Baumgarten of Hungary. In 1931 Radović reached the doubles semifinal of the international Balkan Cup tournament at the Bob Club in Belgrade.

== Personal life ==
Radović enlisted into the Royal Yugoslav Army in April 1941, during World War II. He was soon taken prisoner and transported to a German concentration camp. He was released just before the end of the war. Radović became a member of the Serbian Academy of Sciences and Arts in 1970. He died in 1973 and was buried in Belgrade's Novo groblje cemetery.

== Painting style ==
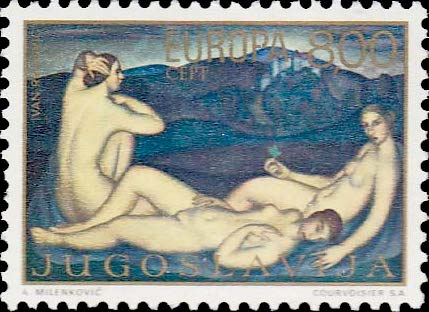
Three Graces by Radović on a 1975 Yugoslavian stamp

Radović's art is described as "evocative of the works of Le Douanier Rousseau, Gauguin and Chagall went through several stages which often overlapped as parallel research does, from contemplative rationalism to the emotional, instinctive and irrational". His two main eras are the neoclassicism style in 1922–1926 and the abstract style between 1923 and 1924. He was strongly influenced by Venetian renaissance and German Expressionism. Radović's naivism is characterized by "violet and greenish-yellow colours, with a gradual lightening of the gamut, with the introduction of new and recreation of old themes in a different way: portraits, interiors, nudes, still-lifes and landscapes".

== See also ==
- List of Serbian painters

== Works cited ==
- "A Magyar Képzőművészeti Egyetem hallgatói 1871-től a mai napig" [The Hungarian Academy of Fine Arts students from 1871 to the present day]. mke.hu (in Hungarian). Budapest, Hungary: Hungarian University of Fine Arts. Archived from the original on 12 November 2019.
- Kehrling, Béla, ed. (28 June 1930). "Jugoszlávia—Magyarország 3:2" [Yugoslavia—Hungary 3:2] (PDF). Tennisz és Golf (in Hungarian). II (12). Budapest, Hungary: Bethlen Gábor írod. és Nyomdai Rt: 225.
- Kehrling, Béla, ed. (22 October 1930). "Belgrádi Verseny" [Belgrade tournament] (PDF). Tennisz és Golf (in Hungarian). II (19–20). Budapest, Hungary: Bethlen Gábor Irod. és Nyomdai R.T.: 387.
- Kehrling, Béla, ed. (15 May 1931). "Belgrádi tenniszélet és Belgrádi "Bob" Club nemzetközi teniszversenye" [The international tournament at the Bob Club in Belgrade] (PDF). Tennisz és Golf (in Hungarian). III (10). Budapest, Hungary: Egyesült Kő-, Könyvnyomda. Könyv- és Lapkiadó Rt.: 174.
- "Ivan Radović". pavle-beljanski.museum. Novi Sad, Serbia: The Pavle Beljanski Memorial Collection.
- Šoškić, Čedomir (2012). Тениски савез Србије Тенис без граници 1922–2012. [Tennis Association of Serbia, Tennis without borders 1922-2012] (PDF) (in Serbian). Belgrade, Serbia: Tennis Association of Serbia. pp. 258–261. Archived from the original (PDF) on 30 December 2013.
