= List of Estonian actors =

This is a list of Estonian actors.

== A ==
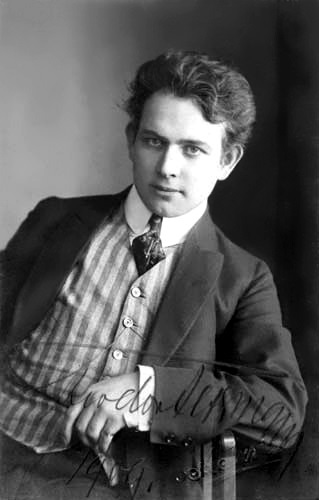
Theodor Altermann

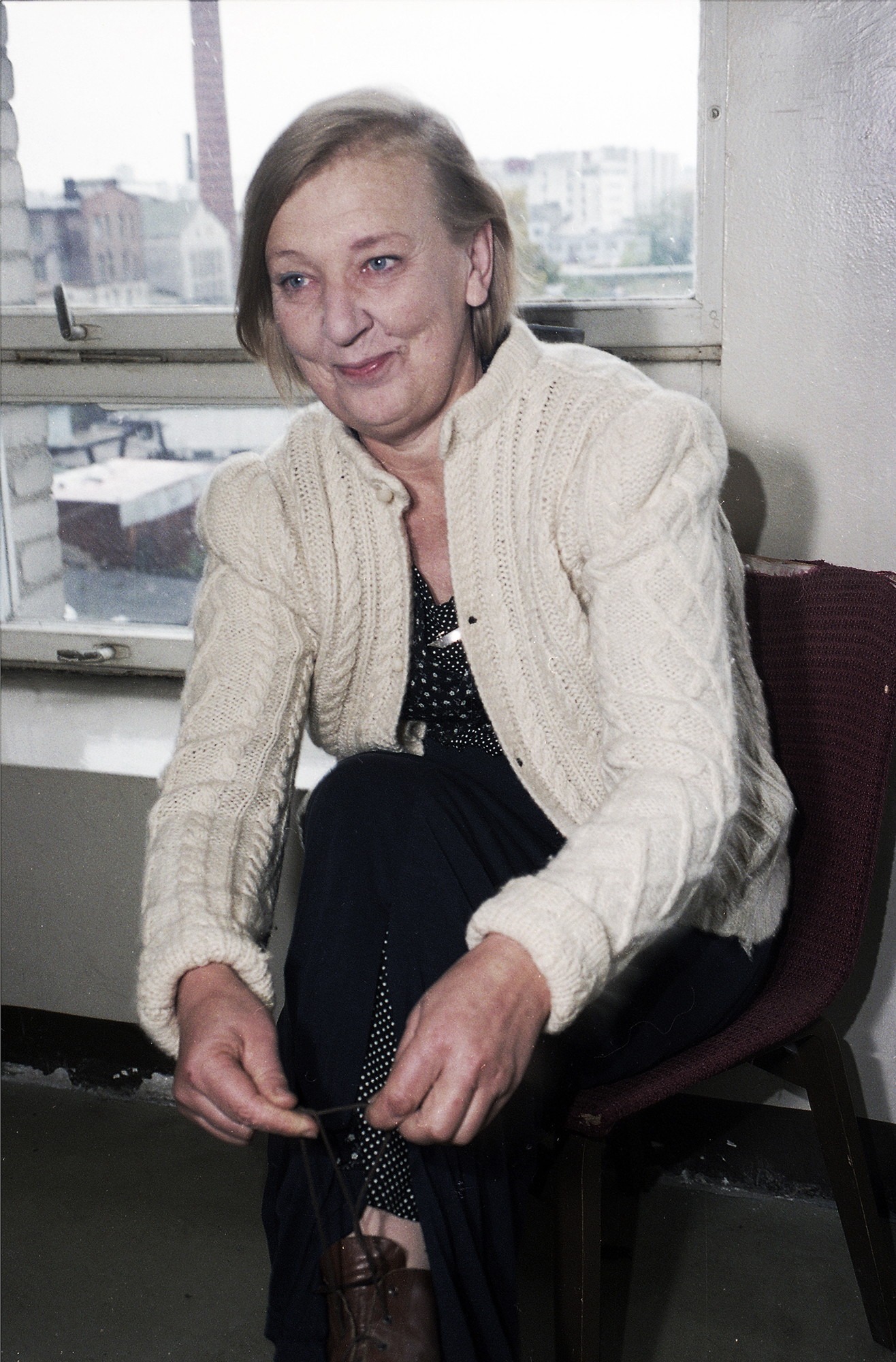
Ines Aru

- Argo Aadli (born 1980)
- Viive Aamisepp (1936–2023)
- Ott Aardam (born 1980)
- Jüri Aarma (1951–2019)
- Irja Aav (1944–1995)
- Tõnu Aav (1939–2019)
- Evald Aavik (1941–2024)
- Ervin Abel (1929–1984)
- Mari Abel (born 1975)
- Raivo Adlas (born 1940)
- Rein Aedma (born 1952)
- Dajan Ahmet (1962–2006)
- Liisa Aibel (born 1972)
- Ellen Alaküla (1927–2011)
- Martin Algus (born 1973)
- Rudolf Allabert (1939–2011)
- Theodor Altermann (1885–1915)
- Ago Anderson (born 1972)
- Maria Annus (born 1979)
- Heino Anto (1882–1955)
- Rein Aren (1927–1990)
- Väino Aren (1933–2023)
- Ines Aru (born 1939)
- Virve Aruoja (1922–2013)
- Märt Avandi (born 1981)
- Maria Avdjuško (born 1968)

== B ==
- Eino Baskin (1929–2015)
- Roman Baskin (1954–2018)

== E ==
- Aleksander Eelmaa (1946–2021)
- Taavi Eelmaa (born 1971)
- Andrus Eelmäe (born 1956)
- Lembit Eelmäe (1927–2009)
- Ivo Eensalu (born 1949)
- Epp Eespäev (born 1961)
- Herta Elviste (1923–2015)
- Andero Ermel (born 1976)
- Ants Eskola (1908–1989)
- Olev Eskola (1914–1990)
- Eda-Ines Etti (born 1981)
- Ita Ever (1931–2023)

== H ==
- Juss Haasma (born 1985)
- Leopold Hansen (1879–1964)
- Johan Hansing (1888–1941)
- Heikki Haravee (1924–2003)
- Tiit Härm (1946–2025)
- Viiu Härm (born 1944)
- Riina Hein (born 1955)
- Kersti Heinloo (born 1976)
- Helle-Reet Helenurm (1944–2003)
- Tiit Helimets (born 1975)
- Evald Hermaküla (1941–2000)
- Valdur Himbek (1925–1991)
- Katri Horma (born 1967)
- Toomas Hussar (born 1962)

== I ==
- Arvo Iho (born 1949)
- Tanel Ingi (born 1976)
- Kaarel Ird (1909–1986)
- Ingrid Isotamm (born 1979)

== J ==
- Merle Jääger (born 1965)
- Adeele Jaago (born 1989)
- Getter Jaani (born 1993)
- Boris Jaanikosk (1897–1976)
- Kadri Jäätma (born 1961)
- Alisa Jakobi (born 1981)
- Peeter Jakobi (1940–2014)
- Maarja Jakobson (born 1977)
- Jüri Järvet (1919–1995)
- Ene Järvis (1947–2025)
- Mikk Jürjens (born 1987)
- Faime Jurno (born 1951)

== K ==
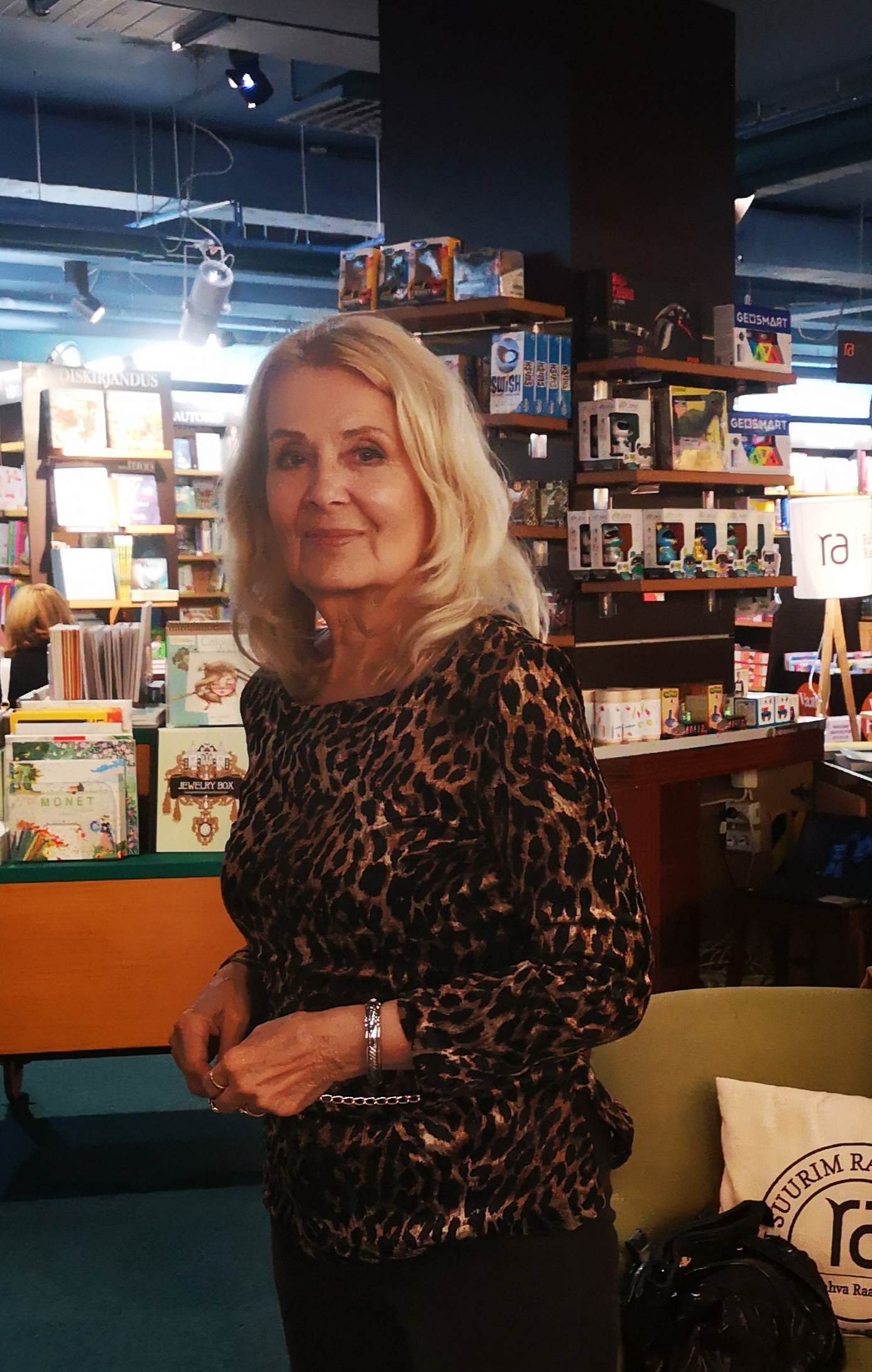
Eve Kivi

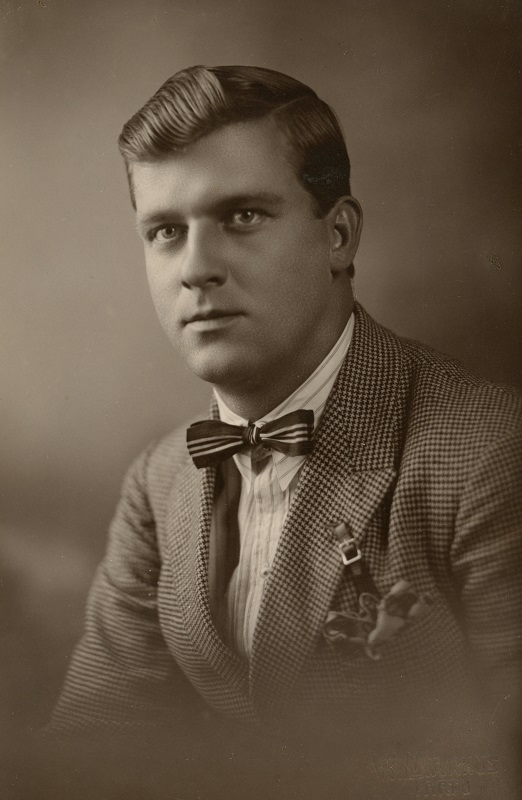
Vambola Kurg

- Ellen Kaarma (1928–1973)
- Epp Kaidu (1915–1976)
- Piret Kalda (born 1966)
- Hans Kaldoja (1942–2017)
- Hannes Kaljujärv (born 1957)
- Rasmus Kaljujärv (born 1981)
- Erika Kaljusaar (born 1956)
- Karl Kalkun (1927–1990)
- Gita Kalmet (born 1959)
- Henrik Kalmet (born 1986)
- Karl-Andreas Kalmet (born 1989)
- Leo Kalmet (1900–1975)
- Madis Kalmet (born 1955)
- Mart Kampus (born 1961)
- Guido Kangur (born 1956)
- Villu Kangur (born 1957)
- Peeter Kard (1940–2006)
- Katrin Karisma (born 1947)
- Feliks Kark (born 1933)
- Tõnu Kark (born 1957)
- Alina Karmazina (born 1981)
- Kirill Käro (born 1975)
- Volli Käro (born 1940)
- Teet Kask (born 1968)
- Ago-Endrik Kerge (1939–2021)
- Urmas Kibuspuu (1953–1985)
- Kaljo Kiisk (1925–2007)
- Tõnu Kilgas (1954–2021)
- Kaarel Kilvet (1944–2005)
- Virve Kiple (1927–2009)
- Vallo Kirs (born 1987)
- Eve Kivi (born 1938)
- Ingrid Kivirähk (1931–2024)
- Maria Klenskaja (1951–2022)
- Enn Klooren (1940–2011)
- Mati Klooren (1938–2000)
- Katrin Kohv (born 1964)
- Liisi Koikson (born 1983)
- Kalju Komissarov (1946–2017)
- Luule Komissarov (born 1942)
- Amalie Konsa (1873–1949)
- Aire Koop (born 1957)
- Heikki Koort (1955–2021)
- Alo Kõrve (born 1978)
- Hele Kõrve (born 1980)
- Harry Kõrvits (born 1953)
- Henry Kõrvits (born 1974)
- Enn Kraam (1943–2001)
- Kersti Kreismann (born 1947)
- Jüri Krjukov (1954–1997)
- Kärt Kross (born 1968)
- Piret Krumm (born 1989)
- Arvo Kruusement (born 1928)
- Risto Kübar (born 1983)
- Arvo Kukumägi (1958–2017)
- Grete Kuld (born 1989)
- Elle Kull (born 1952)
- Helle Kuningas (1949–2014)
- Vambola Kurg (1898–1981)
- Voldemar Kuslap (born 1937)
- Lenna Kuurmaa (born 1985)
- Betty Kuuskemaa (1879–1966)

== L ==
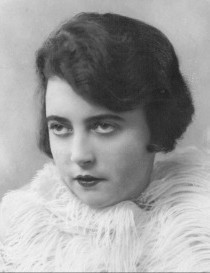
Aksella Luts

- Marta Laan (born 1985)
- Aare Laanemets (1954–2000)
- Karl Laas (1892–after 1944)
- Lia Laats (1926–2004)
- Väino Laes (born 1951)
- Lauri Lagle (born 1981)
- Silvia Laidla (1927–2012)
- Anu Lamp (born 1958)
- Hugo Laur (1893–1977)
- Piret Laurimaa (born 1971)
- Ants Lauter (1894–1973)
- Kristel Leesmend (born 1968)
- Tarmo Leinatamm (1957–2014)
- Astrid Lepa (1924–2015)
- Margus Lepa (born 1953)
- Andres Lepik (born 1957)
- Mait Lepik (born 1968)
- Kadri Lepp (born 1979)
- Mihkel Lepper (1900–1980)
- Ülle Lichtfeldt (born 1970)
- Rea Lest-Liik (born 1990)
- Ellen Liiger (1918–1987)
- Jörgen Liik (1990–2025)
- Arno Liiver (1954–2026)
- Mari Lill (born 1945)
- Mari-Liis Lill (born 1983)
- Tiit Lilleorg (1941–2021)
- Liis Lindmaa (born 1988)
- Raine Loo (1945–2020)
- Priit Loog (born 1984)
- Uno Loop (1930–2021)
- Sulev Luik (1954–1997)
- Terje Luik (born 1941)
- Vilma Luik (born 1959)
- Ada Lundver (1942–2011)
- Aksella Luts (1905–2005)
- Meta Luts (1905–1958)
- Ain Lutsepp (born 1954)
- Kristjan Lüüs (born 1991)

== M ==
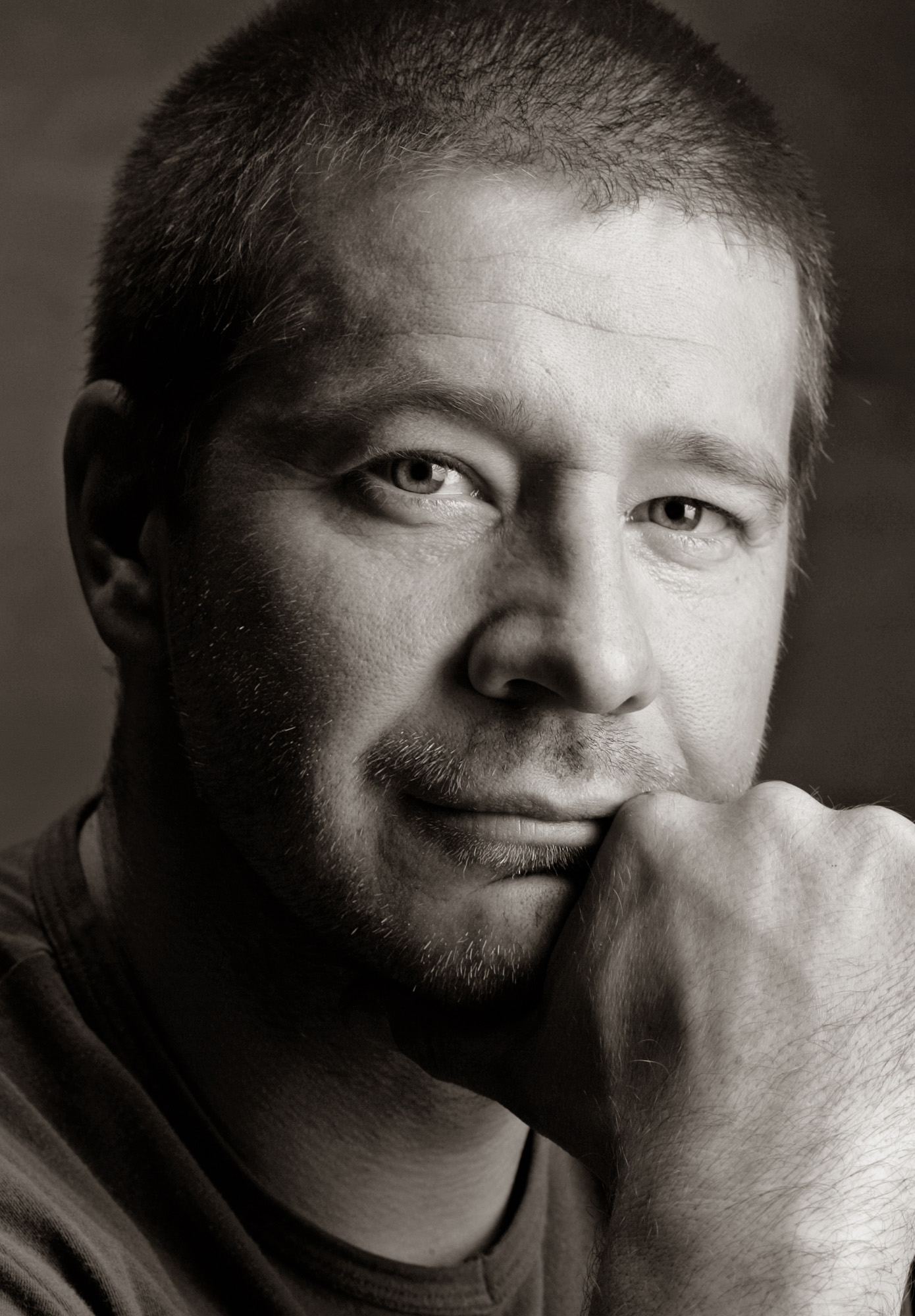
Marko Matvere

- Ain Mäeots (born 1971)
- Arvi Mägi (born 1949)
- Laine Mägi (born 1959)
- Maarja Johanna Mägi (born 1997)
- Marin Mägi (born 1982)
- Tõnis Mägi (born 1948)
- Andres Mähar (born 1978)
- Riina Maidre (born 1982)
- Andres Maimik (born 1970)
- Tiina Mälberg (born 1970)
- Franz Malmsten (1905–1967)
- Mait Malmsten (born 1972)
- Heino Mandri (1922–1990)
- Anne Margiste (born 1942)
- Marko Matvere (born 1968)
- Eva Meil (1917–2002)
- Helle Meri (1949–2024)
- Alfred Mering (1903–1988)
- Märten Metsaviir (born 1994)
- Helena Merzin-Tamm (born 1972)
- Leonhard Merzin (1934–1990)
- Laine Mesikäpp (1917–2012)
- Marje Metsur (born 1941)
- Kaie Mihkelson (born 1948)
- Carmen Mikiver (born 1964)
- Mikk Mikiver (1937–2006)
- Tõnu Mikiver (1943–2017)
- Angelika Mikk (born 1973)
- Madis Milling (1970–2022)
- Mari Möldre (born 1992)
- Hartius Möller (1885–1942)
- Felix Moor (1903–1955)
- Meelis Muhu (born 1972)
- Hilje Murel (born 1975)
- Jüri Müür (1929–1984)
- Mart Müürisepp (born 1991)

== N ==
- Jüri Nael (born 1975)
- Kaili Närep (born 1970)
- Lauri Nebel (born 1948)
- Eero Neemre (1905–1994)
- Sulev Nõmmik (1931–1992)
- Andres Noormets (born 1963)
- Egon Nuter (born 1955)
- Rudolf Nuude (1909–1980)

== O ==
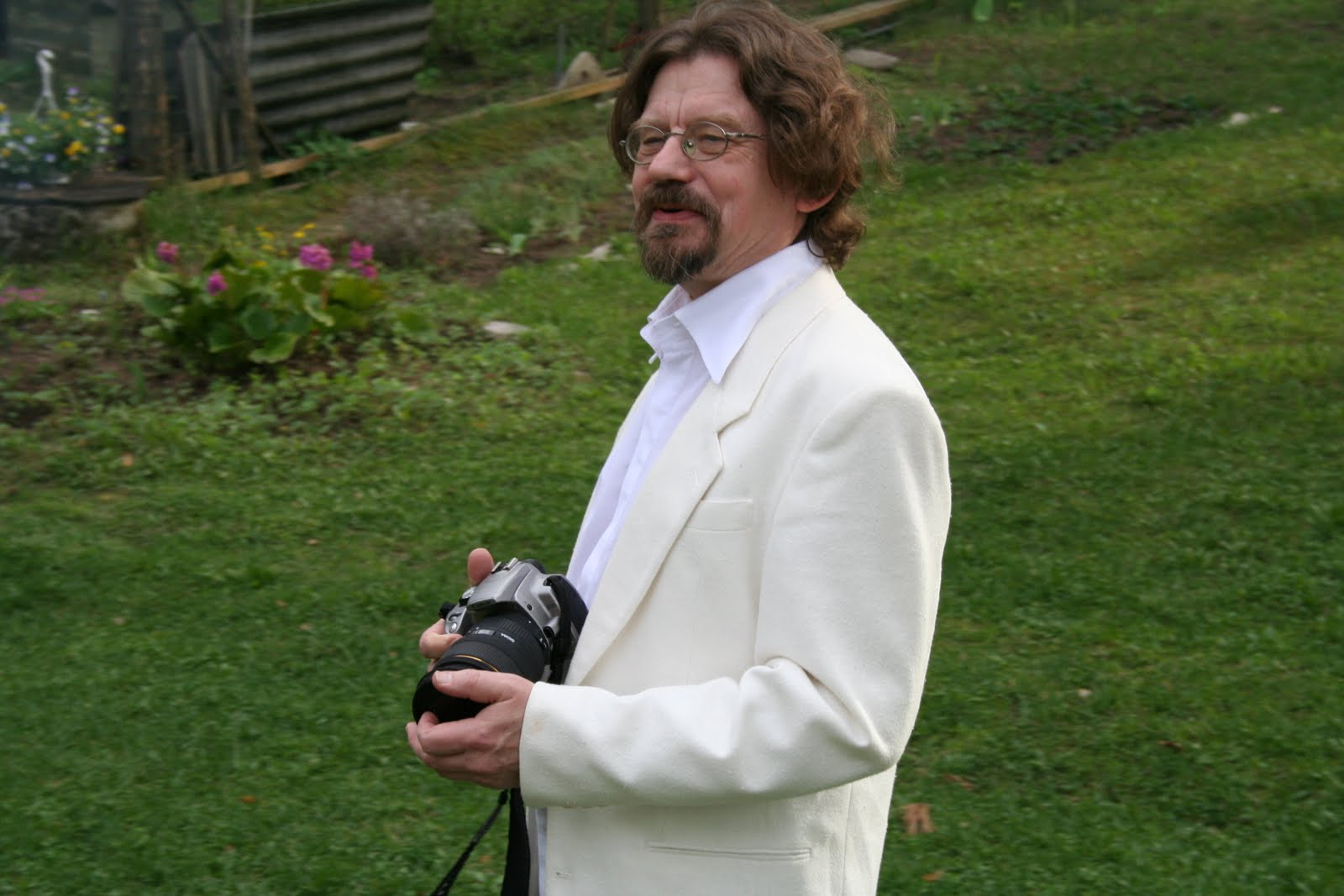
Kalju Orro

- Andres Oja (actor) (born 1983)
- Dagmar Oja (born 1981)
- Tõnu Oja (born 1958)
- Pääru Oja (born 1989)
- Peeter Oja (born 1960)
- Rein Oja (born 1956)
- Indrek Ojari (born 1977)
- Liina Olmaru (born 1967)
- Margus Oopkaup (1959–2025)
- Aksel Orav (1929–2003)
- Õie Orav (born 1934)
- Jaanus Orgulas (1927–2011)
- Liina Orlova (born 1941)
- Kalju Orro (born 1952)
- Olav Osolin (born 1953)
- Georg Ots (1920–1975)
- Velda Otsus (1913–2006)
- Bruno O'Ya (1933–2002)

== P ==
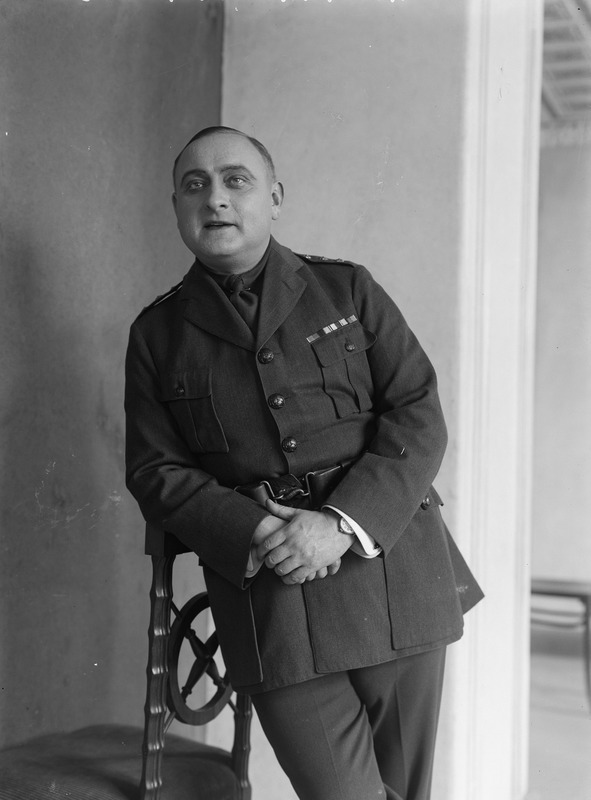
Paul Pinna

- Elina Pähklimägi (born 1983)
- Meelis Pai (born 1968)
- Ester Pajusoo (born 1934)
- Merle Palmiste (born 1970)
- Külli Palmsaar (born 1966)
- Anne Paluver (born 1952)
- Voldemar Panso (1920–1977)
- Endel Pärn (1914–1990)
- Katrin Pärn (born 1977)
- Lauri Pedaja (born 1987)
- Priit Pedajas (born 1954)
- Helend Peep (1910–2007)
- Salme Peetson (1885–1967)
- Terje Pennie (born 1960)
- Ruth Peramets-Püss (1927–2005)
- Lembit Peterson (born 1953)
- Paul Pinna (1884–1949)
- Maiken Pius (born 1985)
- Märt Pius (born 1989)
- Priit Pius (born 1989)
- Saara Pius (born 1990)
- Mirtel Pohla (born 1982)
- Mari Pokinen (born 1988)
- Dan Põldroos (1970–2007)
- Paul Poom (born 1958)
- Salme Poopuu (1939–2017)
- Veiko Porkanen (born 1989)
- Margus Prangel (born 1974)
- Linnar Priimägi (born 1954)
- Jaak Prints (born 1981)
- Ain Prosa (born 1967)
- Liisa Pulk (born 1985)
- Pille Pürg (born 1972)
- Eva Püssa (born 1971)
- Eduard Pütsep (1898–1960)
- Väino Puura (born 1951)
- Andres Puustusmaa (born 1971)

== R ==
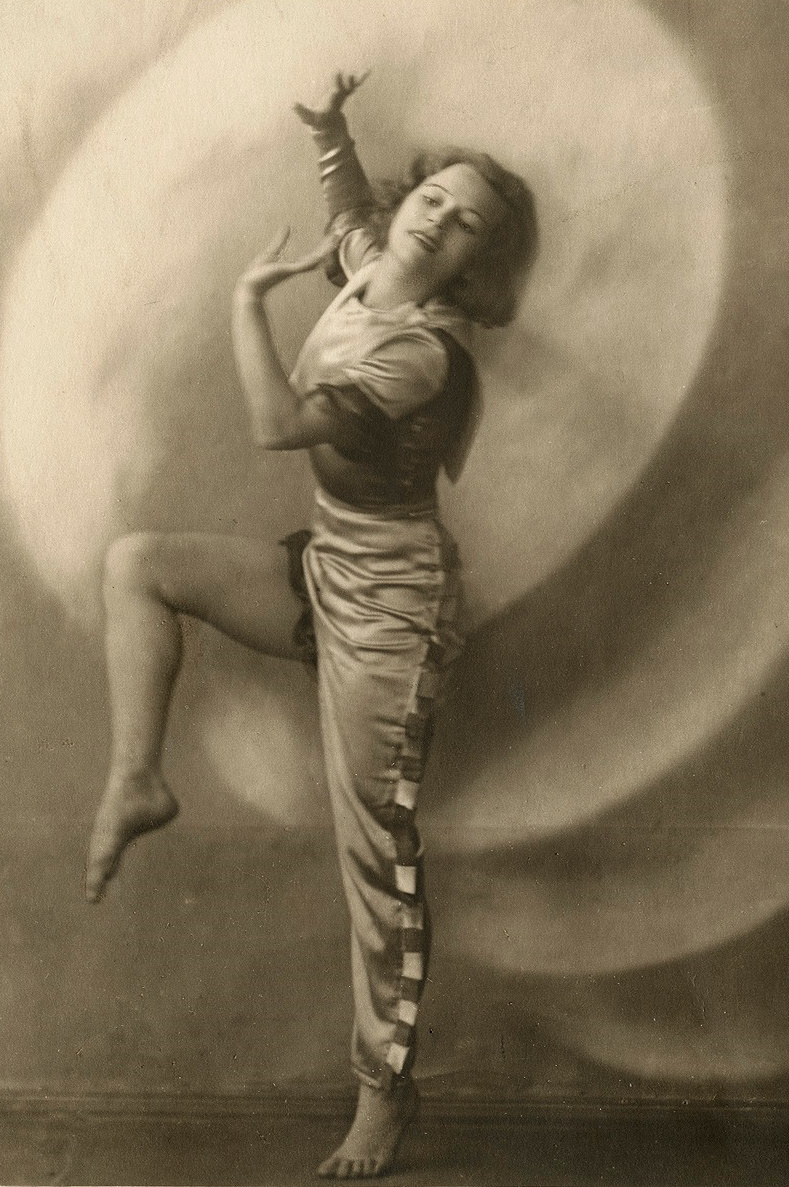
Salme Reek

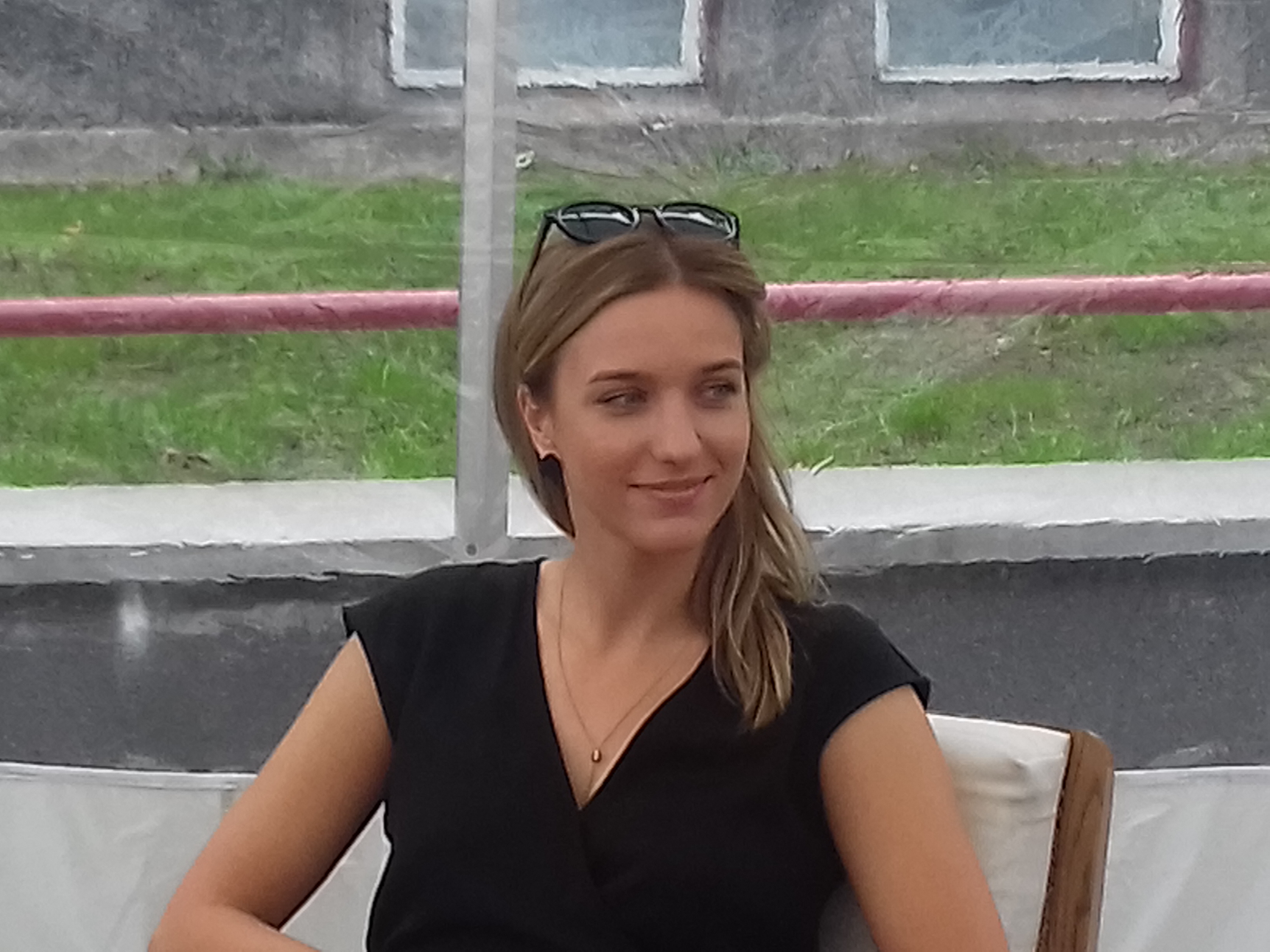
Liis Remmel

- Tõnu Raadik (born 1957)
- Andres Raag (born 1970)
- Ilmar Raag (born 1969)
- Kaljo Raag (1892–1967)
- Rita Raave (born 1951)
- Kaarin Raid (1942–2014)
- Liis Remmel (born 1989)
- Ene Rämmeld (born 1947)
- Kadri Rämmeld (born 1976)
- Meelis Rämmeld (born 1975)
- Leida Rammo (1924–2020)
- Karin Rask (born 1979)
- Maila Rästas (1937–2008)
- Katariina Ratasepp (born 1986)
- Ursula Ratasepp (born 1982)
- Elsa Ratassepp (1893–1972)
- Tõnis Rätsep (born 1947)
- Rita Rätsepp (born 1962)
- Mihkel Raud (born 1969)
- Priit Raudkivi (1920–1970)
- Evi Rauer (1915–2004)
- Salme Reek (1907–1996)
- Anne Reemann (born 1962)
- Leino Rei (born 1972)
- Liina Reiman (1891–1961)
- Veljo Reinik (born 1981)
- Elina Reinold (born 1971)
- Elisabet Reinsalu (born 1976)
- Külli Reinumägi (born 1974)
- René Reinumägi (born 1974)
- Jaan Rekkor (born 1958)
- Ago Roo (born 1946)
- Erik Ruus (1962–2025)

== S ==
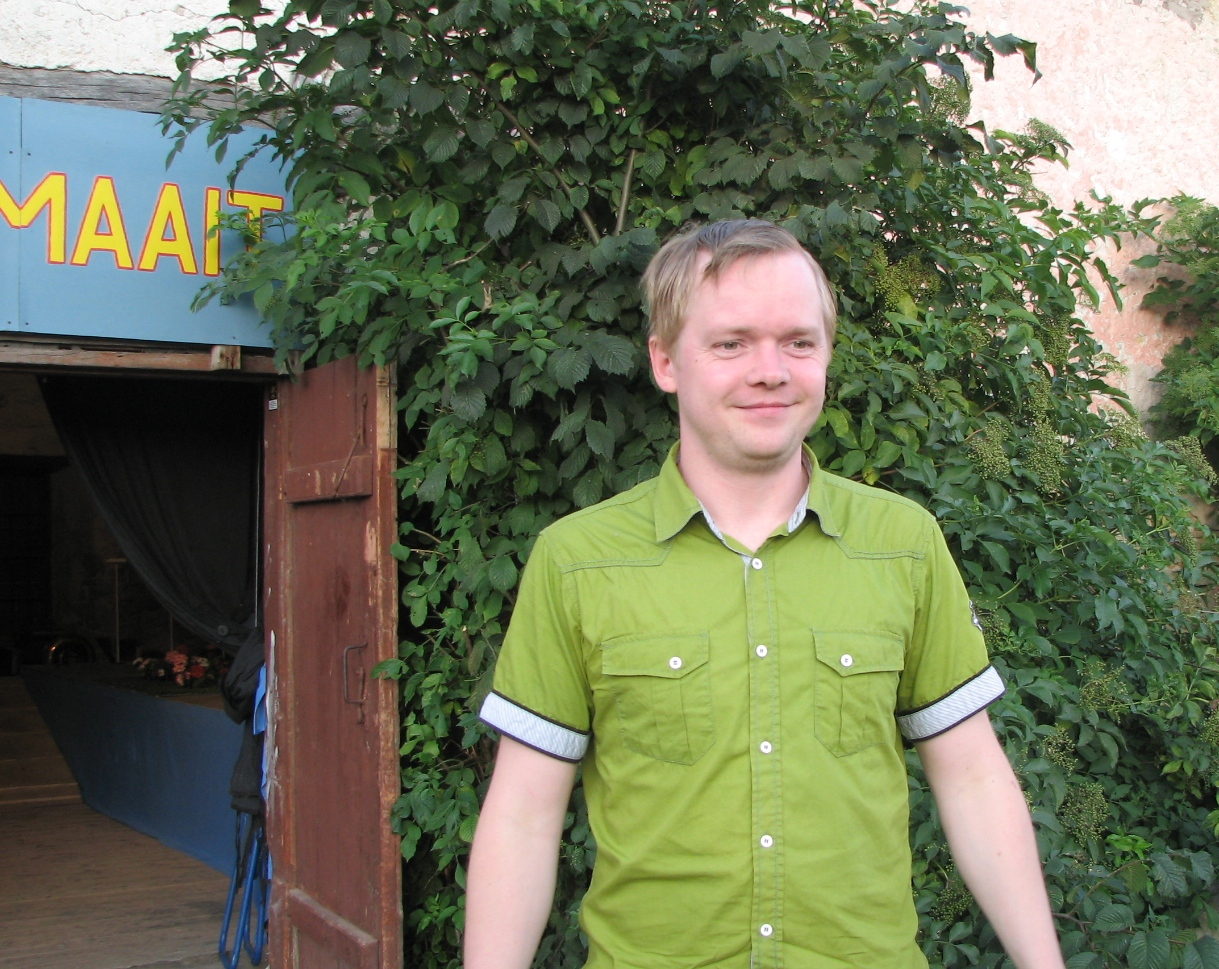
Ott Sepp

- Leila Säälik (born 1941)
- Indrek Saar (born 1973)
- Tõnu Saar (1944–2022)
- Üllar Saaremäe (born 1969)
- Reimo Sagor (born 1987)
- Külliki Saldre (born 1952)
- Helgi Sallo (born 1941)
- Elmar Salulaht (1910–1974)
- Inga Salurand (born 1983)
- Indrek Sammul (born 1972)
- Evelin Samuel (born 1975)
- Mart Sander (born 1967)
- Janek Sarapson (1972–2026)
- Andres Särev (1902–1970)
- Kristjan Sarv (born 1979)
- Aleks Sats (1914–1992)
- Peeter Sauter (born 1962)
- Aino Seep (1925–1982)
- Heino Seljamaa (born 1952)
- Angelina Semjonova (1960–2011)
- Anna Sergejeva (born 1986)
- Ott Sepp (born 1982)
- Lembit Sibul (1947–2001)
- Eili Sild (1942–2026)
- Janika Sillamaa (born 1975)
- Rain Simmul (born 1965)
- Siiri Sisask (born 1968)
- Britta Soll (born 1984)
- Sophie Sooäär (1914–1996)
- Valter Soosõrv (1903–1969)
- Meeli Sööt (1937–2024)
- Aarne Soro (born 1974)
- Eero Spriit (born 1949)
- Tiit Sukk (born 1974)
- Simeoni Sundja (born 1989)
- Arno Suurorg (1903–1960)
- Kulno Süvalep (1929–1996)

== T ==
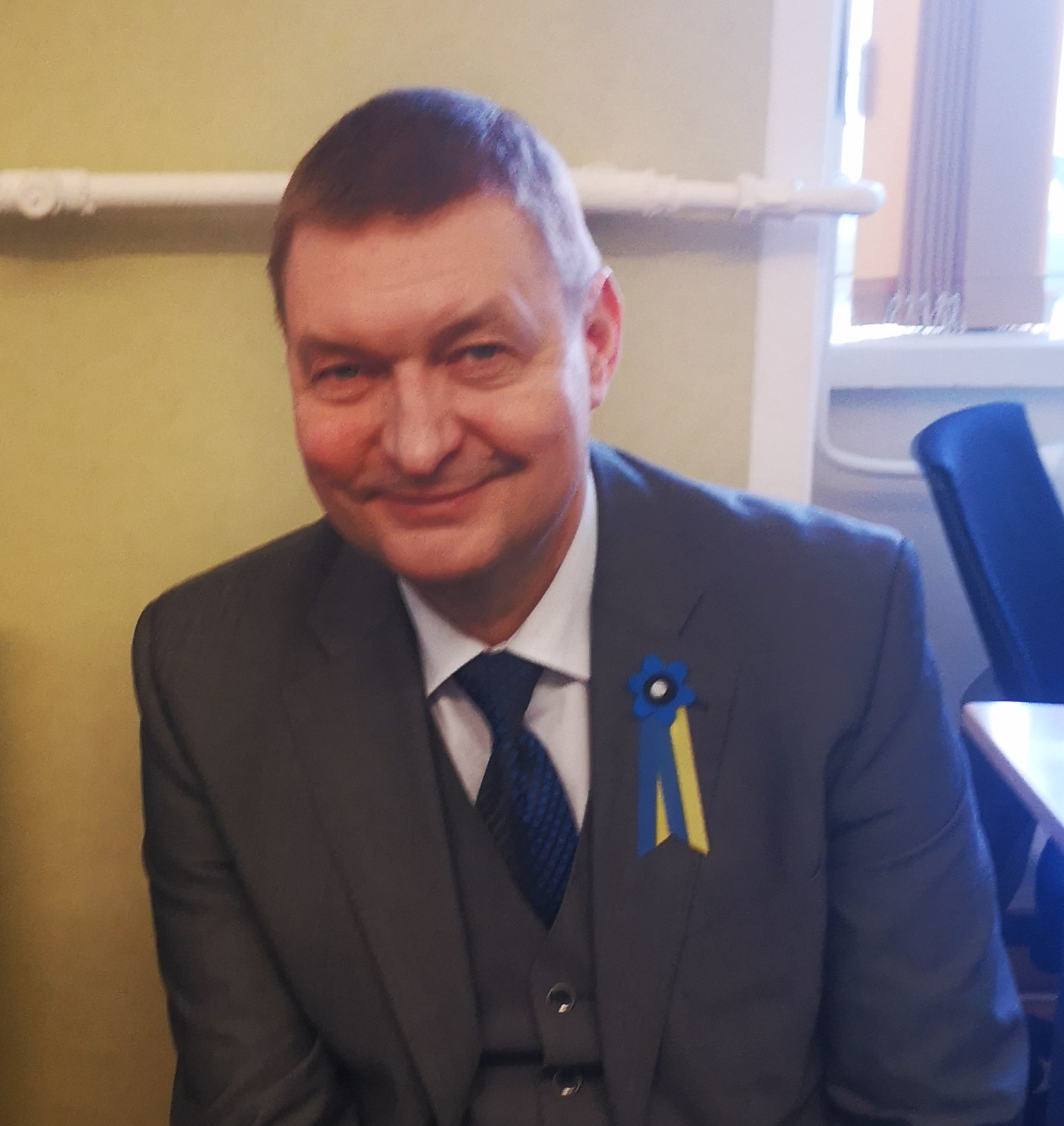
Raivo E. Tamm

- Indrek Taalmaa (born 1967)
- Veikko Täär (born 1971)
- Garmen Tabor (born 1968)
- Margus Tabor (born 1962)
- Andres Tabun (born 1954)
- Aino Talvi (1909–1992)
- Merle Talvik (born 1954)
- Jaak Tamleht (1942–1986)
- Kiiri Tamm (born 1962)
- Raivo E. Tamm (born 1965)
- Karin Tammaru (born 1971)
- Peeter Tammearu (born 1964)
- Kärt Tammjärv (born 1991)
- Kadi Taniloo (1911–1998)
- Ruut Tarmo (1896–1967)
- Jaan Tätte (born 1964)
- Tiina Tauraite (born 1976)
- Lii Tedre (born 1944)
- Külli Teetamm (born 1976)
- Liina Tennosaar (born 1965)
- Sirje Tennosaar (1943–2021)
- Triin Tenso (born 1987)
- Tõnu Tepandi (born 1948)
- Taavi Teplenkov (born 1975)
- Sulev Teppart (born 1960)
- Hardi Tiidus (1918–1999)
- Klaudia Tiitsmaa (born 1990)
- Eduard Tinn (1899–1968)
- Olev Tinn (1920–1971)
- Rain Tolk (born 1977)
- Eduard Toman (born 1960)
- Ülle Toming (born 1955)
- Kärt Tomingas (1967–2025)
- Taimo Toomast (born 1962)
- Koit Toome (born 1979)
- Mart Toome (born 1980)
- Jaan Tooming (1946–2024)
- Harriet Toompere (born 1975)
- Hendrik Toompere Sr. (1946–2008)
- Hendrik Toompere Jr. (born 1965)
- Hendrik Toompere Jr. Jr. (born 1986)
- Enn Toona (1909–1973)
- Heino Torga (1933–2012)
- Raivo Trass (1946–2022)
- Ivan Triesault (1898–1980)
- Lo Tui (1908–1979)
- Tambet Tuisk (born 1976)

== U ==
- Toomas Uibo (born 1971)
- Väino Uibo (1942–2024)
- Albert Üksip (1886–1966)
- Aarne Üksküla (1937–2017)
- Juhan Ulfsak (born 1973)
- Lembit Ulfsak (1947–2017)
- Ülle Ulla (1934–2016)
- Olli Ungvere (1906–1991)
- Katariina Unt (born 1971)
- Johann Urb (born 1977)
- Toomas Urb (born 1958)
- Ivo Uukkivi (born 1965)
- Pärt Uusberg (born 1986)
- Jan Uuspõld (born 1973)

== V ==
- Helmut Vaag (1911–1978)
- Andrus Vaarik (born 1958)
- Marika Vaarik (born 1962)
- Nele-Liis Vaiksoo (born 1984)
- Liina Vahtrik (born 1972)
- Arnold Vaino (1900–1960)
- Katrin Välbe (1904–1981)
- Viire Valdma (born 1960)
- Helene Vannari (1948–2022)
- Hilja Varem (born 1934)
- Sergo Vares (born 1982)
- Ardo Ran Varres (born 1974)
- Ragne Veensalu (1986–2024)
- Kaido Veermäe (born 1971)
- Anne Veesaar (born 1957)
- Ferdinand Veike (1924–2015)
- Kaspar Velberg (born 1989)
- Martin Veinmann (born 1950)
- Asta Vihandi (1929–1993)
- Juhan Viiding (1948–1995)
- Aarne Viisimaa (1898–1989)
- Vello Viisimaa (1928–1991)
- Kaire Vilgats (born 1976)
- Erna Villmer (1889–1965)
- Märt Visnapuu (born 1962)
- Evelin Võigemast (born 1980)
- Priit Võigemast (born 1980)
- Peeter Volkonski (born 1954)
- Peeter Volmer (1940–2002)
- Hannes Võrno (born 1969)
- Silvi Vrait (1951–2013)
