= Uibo =

Family name

Origin
- Language: Estonian
- Meaning: Appletree, Pyrola, wintergreen
- Region of origin: Estonia

Other names
- Variant forms: Uibu, Uibopuu, Õun, Õunapuu, Õunpuu
- Related names: Uiboleht, Uibomägi, Uibomets

Uibo is an Estonian surname derived from uibu, through the contraction of the compound word õunapuu, meaning apple (õun) tree (puu). In common usage, uibuleht means Pyrola and "wintergreen". As of 1 January 2021, 454 men and 513 women in Estonia have the surname Uibo. Uibo is ranked as the 77th most common surname for men in Estonia, and the 72nd most common surname for Estonian women. The surname Uibo is the most common in Põlva County, where 25.86 per 10,000 inhabitants of the county bear the surname. Notable people bearing the surname Uibo include:

- Andres Uibo (born 1956), Estonian organist, music producer, pedagogue and festival director
- Kersti Uibo (born 1956), Estonian filmmaker
- Lembit Uibo (born 1971), Estonian diplomat
- Maicel Uibo (born 1992), Estonian decathlete
- Raivo Uibo (born 1948), Estonian professor of immunology and academic
- Selena Uibo (born 1985), Australian politician
- Tõnis Uibo (born 1945), Estonian singer
- Toomas Uibo (born 1971), Estonian aviation specialist, singer and politician
- Udo Uibo (born 1956), Estonian literary critic, editor, translator and lexicographer
- Väino Uibo (born 1942), Estonian actor and director
- Shaunae Miller-Uibo (born 1994), Bahamian sprinter
