= Uibopuu =

Family name

Origin
- Language: Estonian
- Meaning: Appletree
- Region of origin: Estonia

Other names
- Variant forms: Uibo, Uibu, Õun, Õunapuu, Õunpuu
- Related names: Uiboleht, Uibomägi, Uibomets

Uibopuu is an Estonian surname derived from South Estonian uibu 'apple tree', possibly through the contraction of Standard Estonian õunapuu, a compound of õun 'apple' + puu 'tree'.

As of 1 January 2022, 119 men and 144 women in Estonia have the surname Uibopuu. Uibopuu is ranked as the 639th most common surname for men in Estonia, and the 531st most common surname for Estonian women.

The surname Uibopuu is the most common in Valga County, where 14.75 per 10,000 inhabitants of the county bear the surname.

Notable people bearing the surname Uibopuu include:

- Artur Uibopuu (1879–1930), politician
- Johannes-Heinrich Uibopuu (1886–1986), politician
- Vaike Uibopuu (born 1940), choir director and music teacher
- Valev Uibopuu (1913–1997), writer
