= Visnapuu (surname) =

Visnapuu is an Estonian surname. Notable people with the surname include:

- Henrik Visnapuu (1890–1951), Estonian poet and dramatist
- Indrek Visnapuu (born 1976), Estonian basketball player and coach
- Märt Visnapuu (1962–2025), Estonian actor
