= Vilma Luik =

Estonian actress

Vilma Luik (born 7 November 1959) is an Estonian actress.

Luik was born in Tartu. From 1977 until 1978, she studied at the Vanemuine studios. In 1982, she graduated from Tallinn State Conservatory's performing arts department. Since 1982, she has been engaged at the Ugala Theatre – from 2007 until 2009, the theatre's troupe leader. Besides theatre roles, she has played also in films and television series.

== Recognition ==
- 2020 Viljandi City Theatre Award

== Filmography ==
1982–1983

- Ion Drutse "In the Name of the Earth and the Sun" (Violetta Zamfir)
- John Millington Synge "Hero Across the West" (Pegeen Mike)
- Oscar Wilde / Väino Uibo "The Road to a Happy Garden" (narrator)
- Maxim Gorky "In the North" (Natasha)
- 1983: Nipernaadi (feature film; in the role: Kati)

1983–1984

- Aino Kallas "Mare and her son" (young maiden)
- Rudyard Kipling "The Cat Who Walked on Its Own" (woman)
- Bulat Okudzhava "The Journey of the Dilettantes" (Lavinia Brawura)
- Karel Čapek "White Plague" (Anette)

1984–1985

- Edward Albee "Everything in the Garden" (Louise)
- Aliaksei Dudarav "Over the Threshold" (Alina)
- Anton Chekhov "Chekhov" Jokes (Elena Popova; Tatiana)
- Lion Feuchtwanger / Mati Unt "The Lautensack Brothers" (Man since 1933)

1985–1986

- Tšõngõz Ajtmatov "And a Century Is a Longer Day" (Ajzada)
- Eduard Petiška "How Mutionu Got New Pants" (Helminst, Blueberry)
- Nikolai Baturin "Golden Coast" (singer's daughter Liisa)

1986–1987

- Shakespeare "Othello" (Emilia, episodes)
- Aleksandr Griboyedov "Trouble for Reason" (Princess)
- Vladimir Arro The Women Who Love Us (Maiden)
- Aleksis Kivi Seven Brothers (eit)

1987–1988

- George Bernard Shaw "Androcles and the Lion" (Lavinia; Christian)
- Romain Rolland "Guillotine for Danton" (Lucile Desmoulins)

1988–1989

- Enn Vetemaa "Every Bull Has His Own Horns" (Servant of Luke)

1989–1990 1990–1991

- Anton Chekhov "Seagull" (Masha Samrajeva)
- Alan Ayckbourn "The Marriage Farce" (Jan Davies)

1991–1992

- Margareta Garpe "To Juliet" (Julia)
- 1991: Noorelt õpitud (feature film)
- Truman Capote "The Grass Kannel" (Elizabeth Henderson)
- John Millington Synge "The Holy Source" (Molly Byrne)

1992–1993

- Oskar Luts "Nukitsamees" (Iti)
- Friedrich Schiller "Cunning and Love" (maid Sophie)
- Alexandre Dumas "The Count of Monte Cristo" (Madame de Villefort)
- Anton Chekhov "The Cherry Orchard" (maid Dunjasha)

1993–1994

- Shelagh Delaney "The Lion in Love" (Nell)
- Albert Ramsdell Gurney "Dining Room" (various roles)
- Vladislav Koržets "The Three Crown Opera" (Betty)
- Tennessee Williams "Summer and Smoke" (Rosa Gonzales)

1994–1995

- "A Tale of a Real Duckling" (Chinese woman)
- Arthur Miller "The Witches of Salem" (Elizabeth Proctor)

1995–1996

- John Driver / Jeffrey Haddow "Chekhov at Yalta" (Maria Chekhova)
- Mikhail Bulgakov "Half-witted Jourdain" (Mrs. Beauval)
- Jevgeni Švarts "Dragon" (citizen)

1996–1997

- James Krüss "Timm Thaler or Sold Laughter" (stepmother)
- August Kitzberg "Matchmaking" (servant Miili)
- Helmut Krausser "Batman with a Chainsaw" (female)
- Tammsaare "Truth and Justice" (Miina)

1997–1998

- Isaak Babel "Sunset" (Dvoira)
- Friedrich Schiller "Maria Stuart" (rounder)
- Timo K. Mukka "Song of Sipirja Children" (Keskitaipale Aili)
- Astrid Saalbach "Dance Lesson" (Rose)

1998–1999

- Leo Tolstoy "The Living Corpse" (Nanny)
- Valner Valme / Gert Kiiler "Help, Korupid!" (mother Nataasha)
- Eduard Vilde "Flawed Brides" (Leena)
- Ursula K. Le Guin "The wizard of Zealand. The Shores of the Day". (Akaren; ivy; episodes)

1999–2000

- David Williamson "Friends and Money" (Jaquie)
- Jalmari Finne "Women's Jokes, Men's Games" (Emma)
- Havard Zoll "Greene's Testament" (Sibella Greene)

2000–2001

- George Bernard Shaw "Pygmalion" (Miss Hill)
- Colin Higgins / Jean-Claude Carriere "Harold and Maude"
- Mark Twain "The Adventures of Tom Sawyer" (Miss Thatcher)
- Urmas Vadi "Steal More Strange Bears" (Mother Aime)
- Jaan Kross "Mardileib" (Lady of the Town Hall Kalle)

2001–2002

- Eduardo de Filippo "Marriage the Italian Way" (Maid Lucia)
- Max Lundgren "A Dream of Mallorca" (Hilda)
- Oskar Luts "Spring" (sleeved)
- Ben Elton "Popcorn" (reporter Kristen)

2002–2003

- Gerald Durrell "My Family and Other Animals" (Miss Durell)
- Hella Wuolijoki Niskamäe's passions (judge's wife)
- Andres Noormets "Snow Rabbits" (Pill)
- Éric-Emmanuel Schmitt Don Juan's Night (Mrs. Cassin)
- August Gailit "Toomas Nipernaadi" (writer's wife)

2003–2004

- Charles de Coster "Thijl Ulenspiegel" (Pleasure Girl)
- Peter Horsler "Cut it down and shoot it" (Miss Spout)

2004–2005

- Eve Ensler "Vagina Monologues" (partial)

2005–2006

- Antonio Buero Vallejo "The Blazing Darkness" (donja Pepita)
- Leo Tolstoy "Anna Karenina" (Countess Lidia Ivanovna)
- Anton Chekhov "Three Glasses of Cherry Vodka" (various roles)

2006–2007

- Eppu Nuotio / Tiina Brännare / Matti Seppänen "Marilyn" (neighbour Rose)
- George Bizet / Nagle Jackson "Opera Comique" (la Tartine)
- Ott Aardam "The Stock Exchange and the Stock Exchange Lady" (Rauns' wife; Swedish woman)
- Bernard Kangermann "Naabri Mari" (mother and companion)

2007–2008

- Kamal Abdulla "Come, all of you..." (voice)

2008–2009

- Jaan Kross "The Emperor's Madman" (Maria Feodorovna)
- Gerald Sibleyras "Graffiti" (Mrs. Bouvier)
- 2009 and 2012: Kelgukoerad (television series)

2010-2019

- 2019: Ükssarvik (feature film; in the role: Õie's mother)
