= Kadri Hinrikus =

Estonian children's writer and journalist

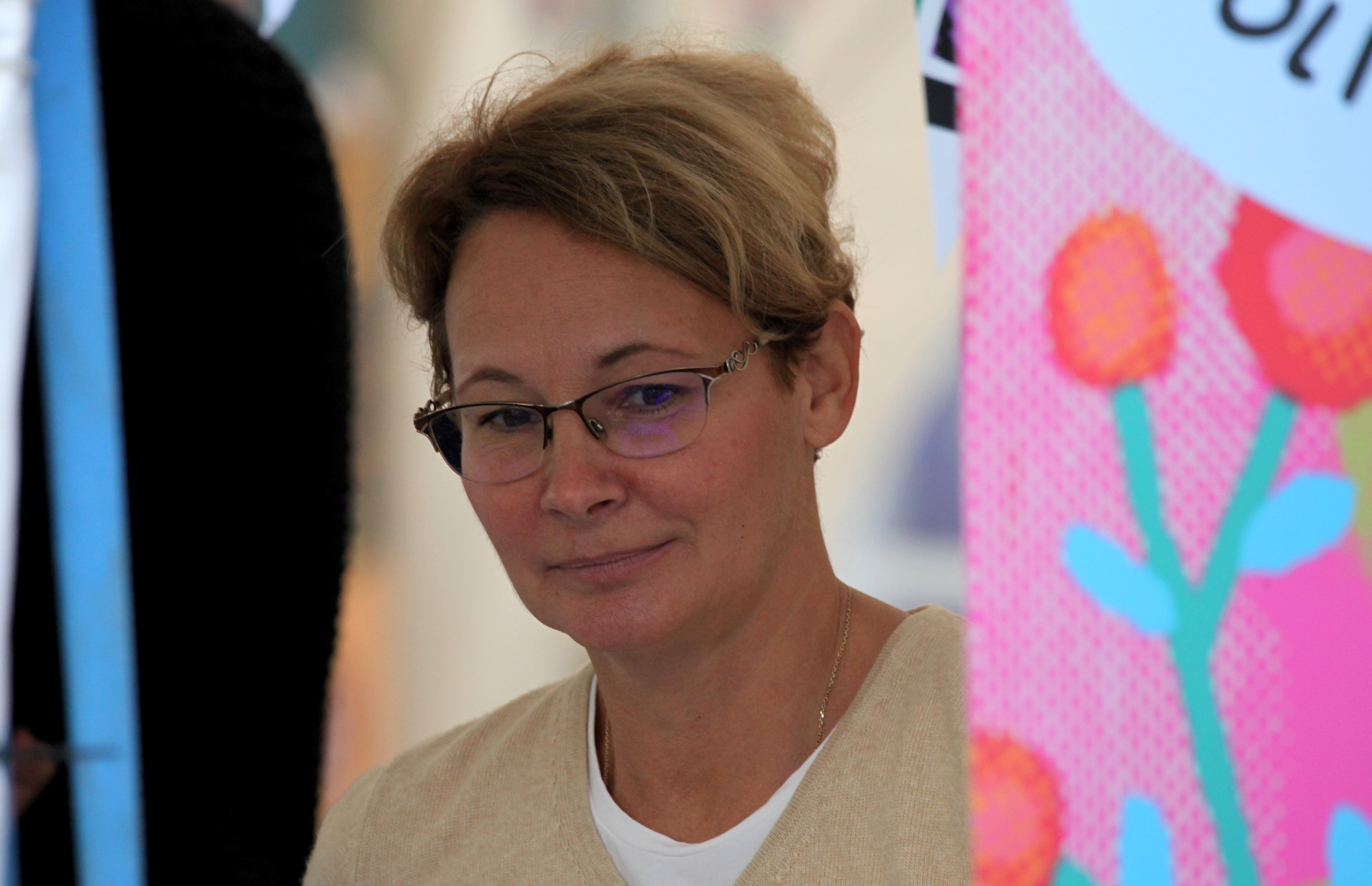
Kadri Hinrikus at the annual Literary Street festival 2021 in Tallinn, Estonia

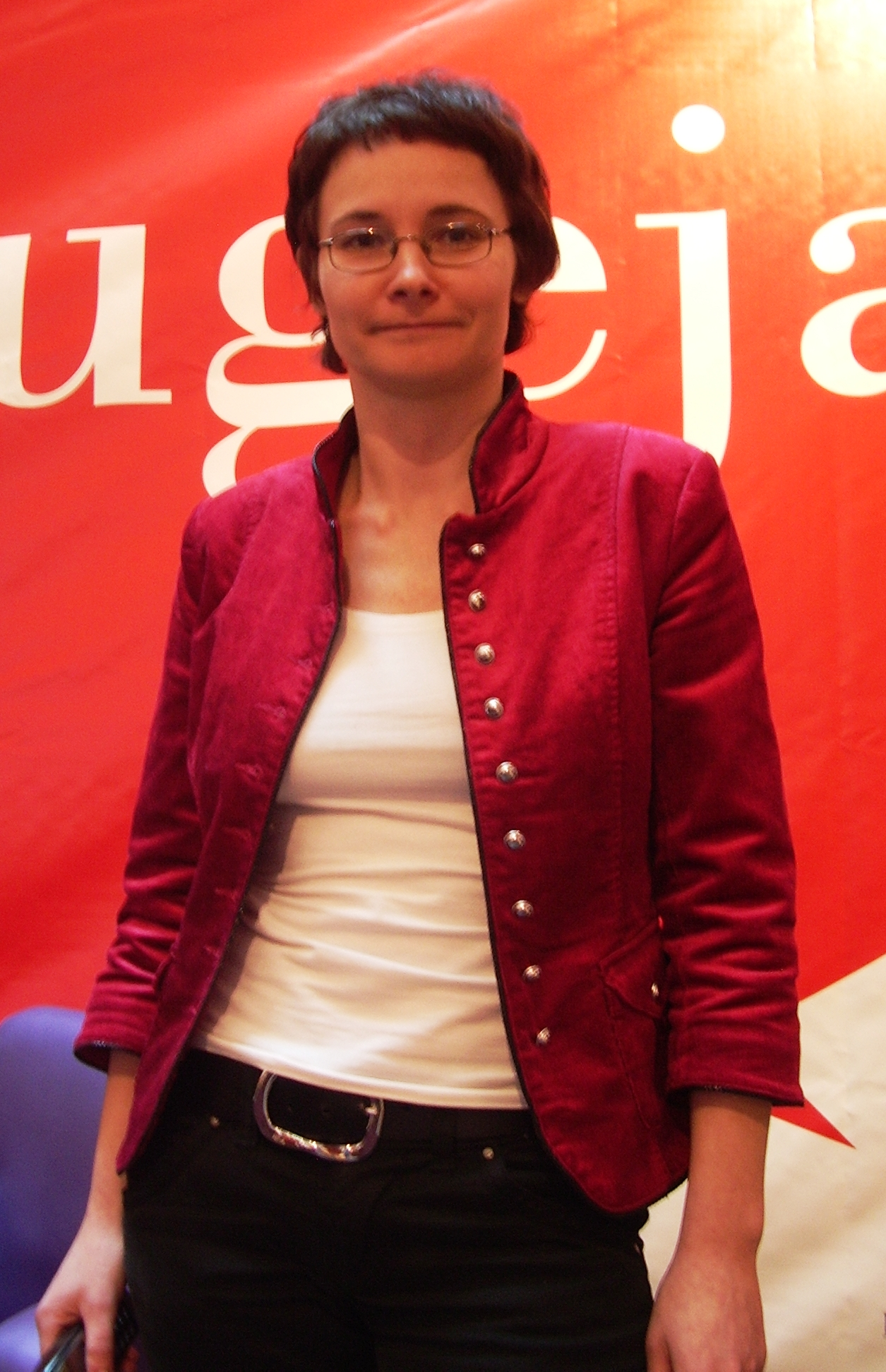
Kadri Hinrikus

Kadri Hinrikus (born 22 June 1970) is an Estonian children's writer and journalist.

She has graduated from Tallinn University in theatre direction.

She has been an editor and news anchor for Estonian national television (Eesti Televisioon). She is working as an editor for children's magazine Täheke.

She has written several children's books. Her works were featured in the White Ravens catalogue in 2013 and 2016.
