= Graveyard Keeper's Daughter =

2011 film

- Directed by: Katrin Laur
- Written by: Katrin Laur
- Produced by: Mati Sepping
- Starring: Maria Avdjuško
- Cinematography: Anssi Leino
- Music by: Pärt Uusberg
- Release date: 25 February 2011
- Running time: 98 minutes
- Country: Estonia
- Language: Estonian

Graveyard Keeper's Daughter (Estonian: Surnuaiavahi tütar) is a 2011 Estonian drama film written and directed by Katrin Laur.

== Cast ==
- Maria Avdjuško as Maria
- Epp Eespäev as Tuvike
- Kertu-Killu Grenman as Lucia
- Ülle Kaljuste as Anne
- Eva Klemets as Õp. Mets
- Kersti Kreismann as Õp. Purga
- Arvo Kukumägi as Joss
- Esther Kõiv as Jats
- Ulla Reinikainen as Sirpa
- Rain Simmul as Kaido
- Katrin Järv as Saara
- Andres Tabun as Robert
- Terje Pennie as Poe-Livii
- Karin Tammaru as Direktor Jaaksoo
- Carolina Kuris as Jasmin
- Kristel Leesmend as Ilse
- Tarvo Poldomaa as Anto
- Priit Sepp as Sverre
- Haide Männamäe as Haide Männamäe
- Märt Visnapuu as Pats
- Mait Lepik as Shelter guard
- Andres Raag
