= Noored kotkad =

1927 film by Theodor Luts

- Directed by: Theodor Luts
- Written by: Theodor Luts; Aksella Luts
- Produced by: Theodor Luts
- Starring: Arnold Vaino; Juhan Nõmmik; Amalie Konsa; Ruut Tarmo; Vambola Kurg; Elli Põder-Roht; Osvald Lipp
- Music by: Heino Eller; Artur Kapp; Villem Kapp; Raimond Kull; Villem Reimann
- Distributed by: Siirius Film; Taska Film
- Release dates: 19 November 1927 (Estonia); 1982 (France, Germany, Poland)
- Running time: 87 minutes
- Country: Estonia
- Languages: Silent; Estonian intertitles

Noored kotkad (English: The Young Eagles) is a 1927 Estonian silent film about the Estonian War of Independence that was fought between 1918 and 1920.

It was filmed in 1927 in Tartu, Mustvee, Värska, and Tartu County. The film was digitally restored in 2008 by Taska Productions and Digital Film Finland.

== Cast ==
- Arnold Vaino as Tammekänd
- Juhan Nõmmik as Laansoo
- Ruut Tarmo as Lepik
- Elli Põder-Roht as Hilja
- Amalie Konsa as Laansoo's mother
- Aksella Luts as Forest-guard's daughter
- Rudolf Ratassepp as Red Army commissar
- Olev Reintalu as Red Army commissar
- Vambola Kurg as Estonian military leader
- Juhan Sütiste as Estonian military leader (as Johannes Schütz)
- August Sunne as Doctor
