= Aksella Luts =

Estonian actress, dancer, and filmmaker (1905–2005)

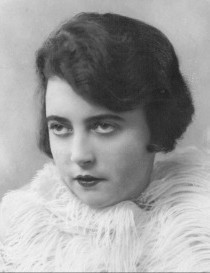
- Luts circa 1925
- Born: Aksella Hildegard Kapsta; 10 November 1905; Moscow, Russian Empire
- Died: 8 January 2005 (aged 99); Pärnu, Estonia
- Other name: Antti Metsalu
- Occupations: Actress, screenwriter, dancer, choreographer, film editor, photojournalist
- Years active: 1924–2005
- Spouse: Theodor Luts (m. 1924; died 1980)

Aksella Luts (born Aksella Hildegard Kapsta; 10 October 1905 – 8 January 2005) was an Estonian actress, screenwriter, dancer, choreographer, film editor and photojournalist.

== Early life ==
Aksella Luts was born Aksella Hildegard Kapsta in Moscow to Estonian parents Martin and Maria Kapsta (née Mark). She was the middle child of three siblings; her sister Erica Regina was born in 1903 and her brother Alfred was born in 1911. The family returned to Estonia when she was quite young. She attended secondary school in Tartu, graduating in 1924 before attending dance classes in Tartu and then the Union des Professeurs de Danse de France (UDPDF) in Paris, where she studied modern dance. She married Estonian future filmmaker Theodor Luts (younger brother of writer Oskar Luts) at age 19 and the two opened a dance studio in Tartu.

== Film ==
In 1927, Theodor Luts founded Tartu Filmiühing (Tartu Film Society) and using the knowledge he had gained from filmmakers in Paris and Berlin, the couple began writing the script for the patriotic silent film Noored kotkad (Young Eagles), which was Estonia's first feature-length dramatic historical film. It was financed through a bank loan. The film was a dramatic telling of the Estonian War of Independence of 1918-1920 and was filmed in Tartu, Mustvee and Värska in the summer of 1927. Theodor directed, acted as cinematographer and had several small roles in the film. Aksella appeared in the film as an actress and was the film's make up artist. Noored kotkad is generally regarded as the cornerstone of Estonian cinema.

After Theodor made several silent film nature and cultural documentaries for Eesti Kultuurfilm, the couple would co-write the script for the 1932 melodrama Päikese lapsed (The Children of the Sun). The film would be Estonia's first feature-length Estonian language sound film; it was co-produced by Erkki Karu of Finland's Suomi-Filmi and Theodor Lutsu Filmiproduktsioon. Theodor would again direct and Aksella would choreograph a dance routine, while Estonian actor Ants Eskola would have a starring role.

== Travel abroad ==
In 1938, Theodor and Aksella moved to Helsinki, Finland, where Theodor hoped to further his education. From 1938 until 1944, Aksella worked as screenwriter under the masculine pen name Antti Metsalu for Fenno-Filmi OY, which was founded by her husband and Yrjö Norta. Many of her scripts from the era were anti-Soviet in nature.

In 1944, the couple moved to Stockholm, Sweden, where Aksella worked as a librarian and archivist at the Folk Universitetet. Following World War II and the annexation of Estonia by the Soviet Union, they relocated to the city of São Lourenço near São Paulo in the South Region of Brazil. In Brazil, the couple made a permanent home. Aksella Luts worked primarily with her husband at his new film company Theodor Lutsu firma as a screenwriter, author of manuscripts, cameraman's assistant, film editor and photojournalist. She was a founding member and secretary of the Estonian Evangelical Lutheran Church in São Paulo (EELK São Paulo Kogudus), worked as a librarian at the Estonian-Brazilian New Cultural Association (Eesti-Brasiilia Kultuuriühing Uus), worked as a film editor at Milo Harbichi Films, and was made an Honorary Member of the Academy of Sciences and Letters of São Lourenço for the introduction of Estonian culture to Brazil.

== Later years ==
Following the death of Theodor Luts on 24 September 1980, Aksella remained in Brazil until 1996, when she returned to Estonia and settled in Pärnu. She gave frequent television and radio interviews and was made an Honorary Member of Eesti Kinoliit (Estonian Filmmaker's Association). She died in Pärnu in 2005, aged 99, and was cremated. Her ashes were buried next to her husband in São Lourenço, Brazil.
