= Eesti Televisioon =

Estonian national television channel

- Country: Estonia
- Broadcast area: Estonia
- Headquarters: Tallinn, Estonia

Programming
- Language: Estonian
- Picture format: 1080i 16:9 HDTV (PAL)

Ownership
- Owner: ERR
- Sister channels: ETV2; ETV+

History
- Launched: 19 July 1955; 71 years ago
- Former names: Tallinna Televisioonistuudio (TTV) (1955–1965)

Links
- Website: jupiter.err.ee/etv (Limited broadcasting outside Estonia)

Eesti Televisioon (ETV) (English: Estonian Television) is an Estonian free-to-air television channel owned and operated by Estonian Public Broadcasting. It made its first broadcast on 19 July 1955.

== History ==
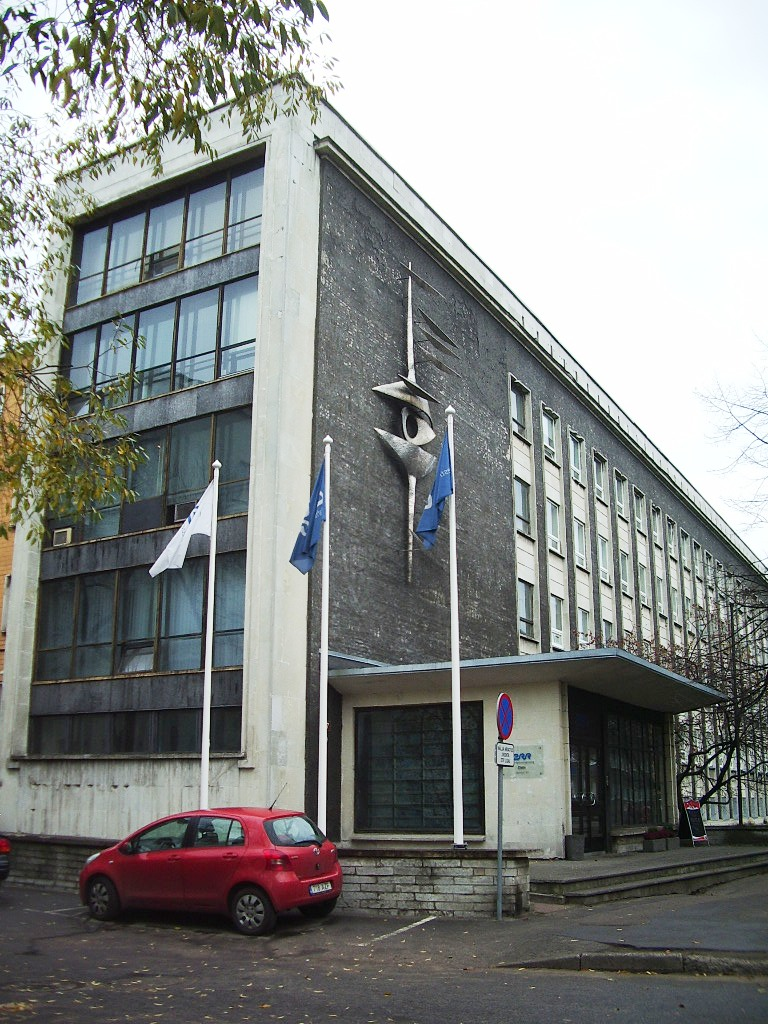
ETV main building at 27 Gonsiori street, Tallinn (November 2008)

Eesti Televisioon (Estonian Television) was launched on 19 July 1955. Before that, television broadcasts in Estonia could only be received from Moscow. The first Estonian-language TV presenter was Ofelia Mikk, whose debut was in the 19 July 1955 test broadcast. Her tenure in television was cut short, because she misspoke out of nervousness.

The first tenured presenter for the nascent ETV was Ruth Peramets-Püss (1927–2005). To find a presenter, a casting competition was held in 1955, but no suitable person was found. By chance, a film in which she starred, was aired on ETV on the day of the competition, and so she was hired.

Kalmer Tennosaar (1928–2004) began as a presenter on 1 January 1956, and subsequently worked as an editor and fellow of music programmes (1957–1962, and then after 1968). He became very popular as the host of a children's songs show "Entel-tentel". Tennosaar later continued his career as a singer.

On 1 January 1993, ETV was admitted as a full active member of the European Broadcasting Union (EBU). From the restoration of independence in 1991 to 31 December 1992, it was a member of the International Radio and Television Organisation (OIRT).

ETV stopped showing commercials in 1998–1999, and has again ceased doing so since 2002: its low-cost advertising rates were damaging the ability of commercial broadcasters to operate. The introduction of a system of broadcast receiver licences, payable by viewers, was considered, but ultimately rejected in the face of public opposition. On 3 September 2001, it started broadcasting DW-TV's Journal in German and TV5's Le Journal in French. These aired during the daytime and catered largely to journalists, public service staff and school students.

In 2002, ETV hosted the Eurovision Song Contest 2002.

On 9 January 2006, ETV launched an Internet news service called ETV24. Broadcasting news on Internet, teletext, and on ETV at night.

Until 2007 ETV was operated by Eesti Televisioon, the eponymous broadcasting organisation. Pursuant to the new Estonian National Broadcasting Act passed by the Estonian Parliament on 18 January 2007, Eesti Televisioon merged with Eesti Raadio (Estonian Radio, ER) on 1 June 2007 to form the Estonian Public Broadcasting service, or Eesti Rahvusringhääling (ERR). During the consolidation, the ETV24 news service was replaced with ERR Uudised (ERR News). On the 10th of May 2009, the first HD broadcast was made on ETV.

On 1 July 2010, Estonia completed its transition to digital terrestrial television, discontinuing all analogue services. An informational on-screen message indicating this was visible on the old ETV frequencies until 5 July 2010.

== Funding and management ==
The bulk of ETV's funding comes from government grant-in-aid, around 15% of which is in turn funded by the fees paid by Estonian commercial broadcasters in return for their exclusive right to screen television advertising. ETV itself is editorially fully independent.

== Notable personnel ==
The more well known journalists of ETV include Tõnu Aav, Maire Aunaste, Grete Lõbu, Anu Välba, Katrin Viirpalu, Reet Linna, Monika Tamla, Kadri Hinrikus, Astrid Kannel, Margus Saar, Peeter Kaldre, Mati Talvik, Marko Reikop, Urmas Vaino, Jim Ashilevi, etc.

=== Notable former personnel ===
- Maire Aunaste, presenter and show host, currently member of parliament
- Meelis Kompus, presenter
- Urve Tiidus, presenter, currently member of parliament

=== Notable past personnel ===
- Valdo Pant (1928–1976), journalist and historian
- Kalmer Tennosaar (1928–2004), early presenter for ETV, show host and singer
- Toomas Uba (1943–2000), sports journalist
- Urmas Ott (1955–2008), journalist, presenter and star interviewer
- Aarne Rannamäe (1958–2016), journalist (foreign affairs), news anchor and presenter

== See also ==
- Eesti Telefilm
- Eastern Bloc information dissemination
