= Kadri Lepp =

Estonian actress and children's writer

Kadri Lepp (born on 13 December 1979) is an Estonian actress and children's writer.

She has graduated from Drama School of the Estonian Academy of Music and Theatre in 2002. Since 2000, she is working as an actress at Ugala Theatre.

== Works ==
She has published three children's books:

- Poiss, kes tahtis põgeneda (2016, Tänapäev)
- Lugu hiirest, kellel polnud kelku (2016, Päike ja Pilv)
- Tüdruk, kellel oli saladus (2017, Tänapäev)
