= Terje Luik =

Estonian film actress and television director

Terje Luik in 2020

Terje Luik (born 13 April 1941) is an Estonian film actress and television director.

After 1961 she hasn't played on films anymore. In 1960s she worked as an assistant director at Estonian Television.

== Filmography ==
- 1959 Vallatud kurvid (role: Vaike and Maret)
- 1960 Perekond Männard (role: Helmi Neider)
- 1961 Ohtlikud kurvid (role: Marika and Ellen)
- 1961 Maizes ducis (role: passenger)
