= Theodor Luts =

Estonian film director and cinematographer (1896–1980)

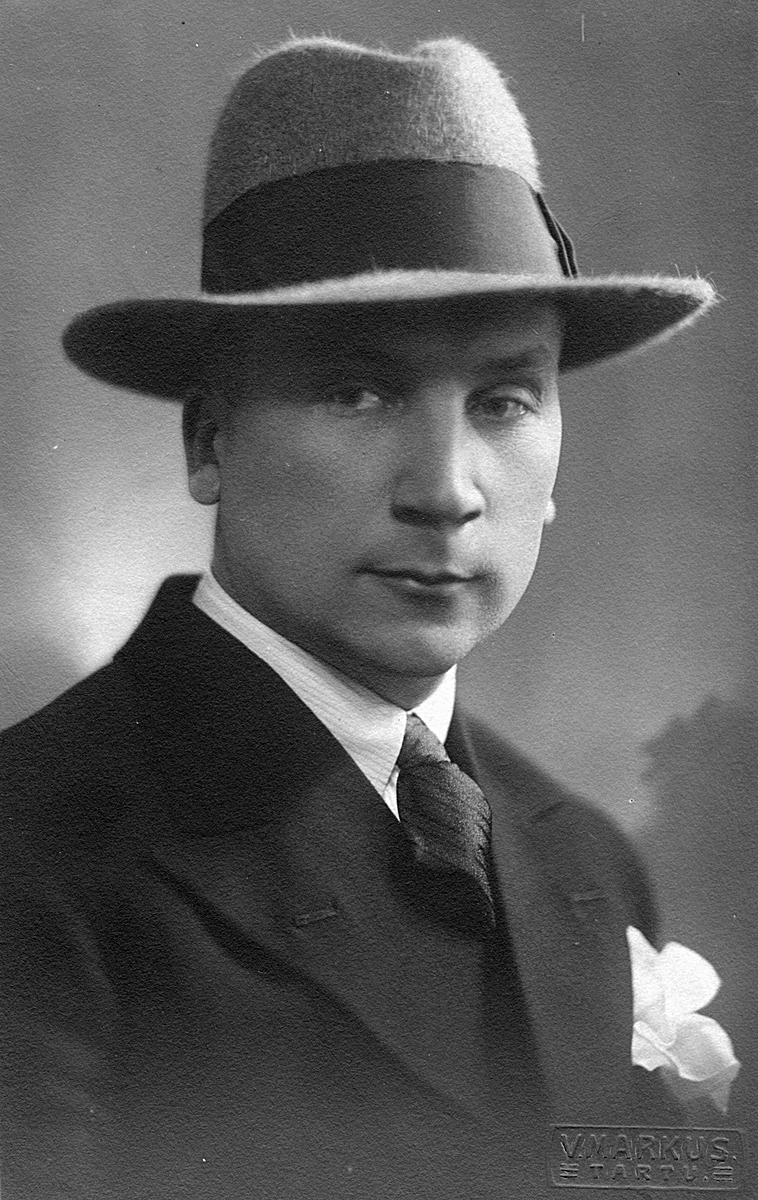
- Luts, c. 1926-30
- Born: 14 August 1896; Palamuse, Estonia
- Died: 24 September 1980 (aged 84); São Paulo, Brazil
- Occupations: Film director, Cinematographer
- Spouse: Aksella Kapsta (m. 1924)

Theodor Luts (14 August [O.S. 2 August] 1896 in Palamuse – 24 September 1980 in São Paulo) was an Estonian film director and cinematographer, brother of classic writer Oskar Luts. Theodor Luts was the first major figure of Estonian cinematography

His Noored kotkad (Young Eagles) (1927) is generally regarded as the cornerstone of Estonian cinema. Päikese lapsed (Children of the Sun) (1932), directed by Luts, was the first Estonian full length sound film.

After the Great Depression hit Estonia in the 1930s Theodor Luts produced mostly documentaries for a state subsidized film studio Eesti Kultuurfilm and also had a successful career in Finland. Twenty-four films by Theodor Luts made in Estonia have survived and are held at the Estonian Film Archives.

Feature films directed by Luts in Finland include Salainen ase (1943) and Varjoja Kannaksella (1943).

After World War II and the Soviet occupation of Estonia, Luts emigrated to Brazil with his wife, actress and filmmaker Aksella Luts, where he directed Caraça, Porta do Céu in 1950.
