= Volli Käro =

Estonian actor (born 1940)

- Born: 13 December 1940 (age 85); Kirov Oblast, Russian SFSR, Soviet Union
- Occupation: Actor
- Years active: 1964–present
- Spouse: Viive Aamisepp

Volli Käro (born 13 December 1940) is an Estonian actor who is possibly best known for his long engagement as a stage actor at the Rakvere Theatre in Lääne-Viru County, Estonia. He has also appeared in several film and television roles.

== Early life ==
Volli Käro was born in Kirov Oblast in Russia to Estonian parents Fidrik and Erika Käro who had been resettled in the area as part of the Stolypin reform. He was one of eight siblings. At age four, the family were able to return to Estonia and settled for a while in Loksa and Vihula. Käro attended schools in Väike-Maarja before his father died when Käro was ten. Afterward, the family moved several more times. Because of his family's poor financial situation after the death of his father, he worked on a collective farm following primary school.

It was during a school trip to Tallinn that Käro became interested in theatre after watching Estonian ballerina Helmi Puur perform in Swan Lake. Afterward, he took dance lessons. After graduating from secondary school in 1960, he began working at the Väike-Maarja cultural centre as an artistic instructor, then the artistic director and finally the director. In 1964, he applied to the Estonian SSR State Institute of Music and Theatre (now, the Estonian Academy of Music and Theatre) to work under the tutelage of theatre actor and director Voldemar Panso, but was not accepted.

== Rakvere theatre ==
In 1964, he was offered an engagement at the Rakvere Theatre; Käro would spend over fifty years with the company. Among his more memorable roles in theater were in works by: Arthur Miller, Anton Chekhov, William Shakespeare, A. H. Tammsaare, Johann Wolfgang von Goethe, August Kitzberg, Harold Pinter and Eno Raud. For his long career in the theatre he was made an honorary member of the Estonian Association of Actors, decorated by the city of Rakvere and was nominated for the Estonian Theatre Union prize in 2009.

In celebration of Volli Käro's upcoming 50th year at the Rakvere Teater, a production of Sławomir Mrożek's 1986 absurdist comedy The Contract premiered on 24 May 2013. Directed by Indrek Apinis, the two-person play starred Käro and actor Märt Avandi and began productions in the autumn of 2013 at Rakvere Theatre's small hall. The play concluded with a performance in Tallinn on 18 May 2015.

== Television and film ==
In 1991, Käro made his film debut in the Jaan Kolberg-directed Estonian drama See kadunud tee. He has also appeared in several television roles for such series as Kelgukoerad, Õnnelikud inimesed and Kättemaksukontor. In 2012, he played the role of Karl in the Toomas Hussar directed comedy feature film Seenelkäik (English: Mushrooming). In 2018, he appeared in the Lauri Lagle-directed Allfilm drama Portugal.

== Personal life ==
Volli Käro is married to stage actress Viive Käro (née Aamisepp). He resides in Rakvere and has a summer home in Kärdla on the island of Hiiumaa. His son Allan Käro is a historian and his first cousin, once removed, is actor Kirill Käro.
