= Maire Aunaste =

Estonian journalist

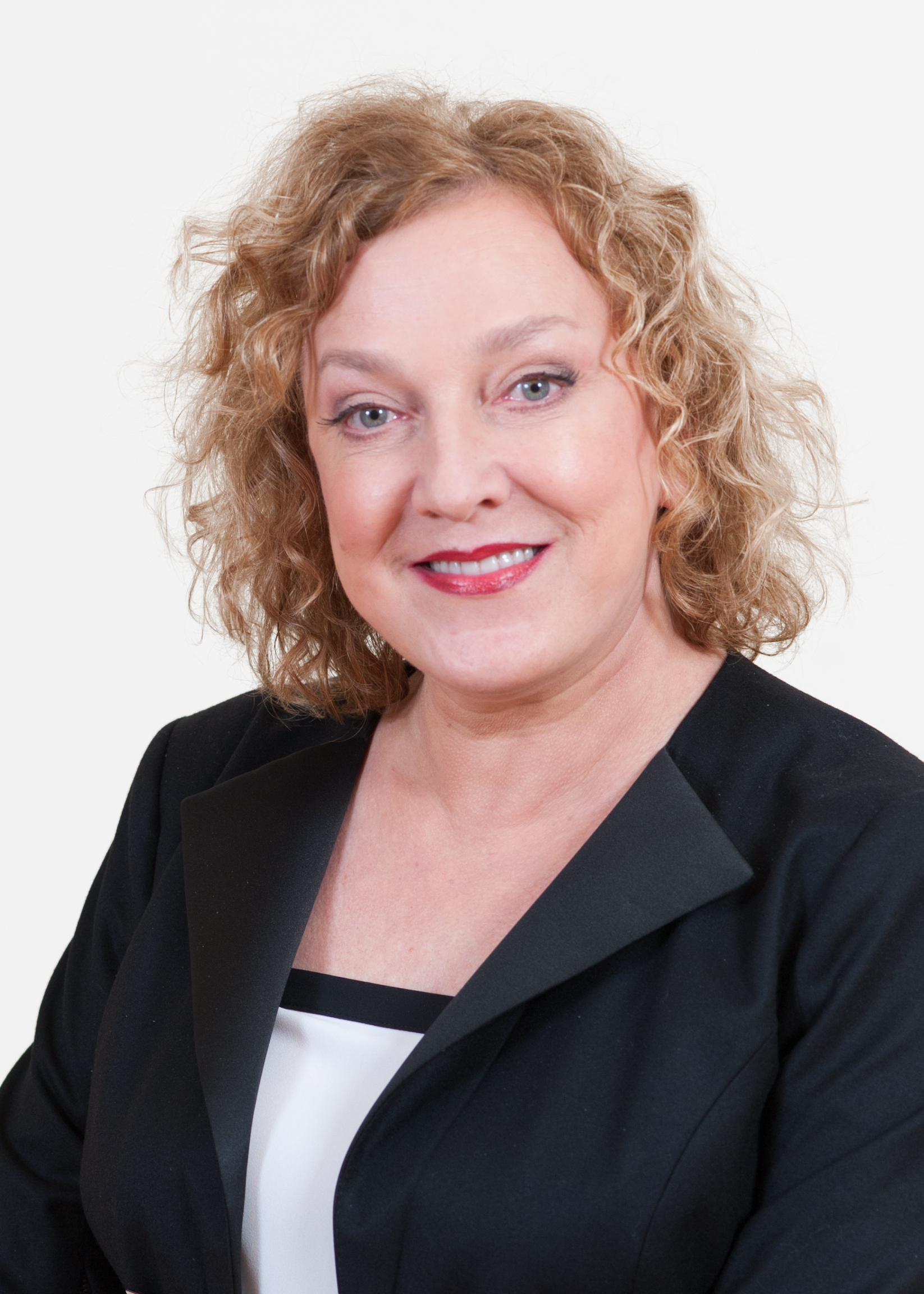
Maire Aunaste in 2015

Maire Aunaste (née Ütt; born November 7, 1953) is an Estonian journalist and politician. In 2015, she was elected to the 13th Riigikogu, representing the Pro Patria and Res Publica Union party.

== Early life and family ==
Maire Aunaste was born Maire Ütt in Tartu. Her father was Helmut-Endel Ütt and her mother's maiden name was Kalaus. She is the oldest of three siblings; her youngest sister is actress Eva Püssa and the middle sister is Tiina Prentsel.

== Career ==
She was an Estonian Television presenter for eight years, and a news reporter for Aktuaalne kaamera. For a total of 10 years, she hosted an Eesti Televisioon entertainment show Out With You, and Kanal 2's We.

On 27 April 2005, in a poll published by the magazine Week, Aunaste was selected as the second best TV host with 626 votes, after Anu Välba, and before Eda-Ines Etti. In 2007, she came in second again in the same election, and this time Anu Välba was first and Aigi Vahing (:et) third.

In the 2015 Estonian parliamentary election, Aunaste won 679 votes.

== Work on the radio ==
- 2004 - "Tuesdays with you" Vikerraadio culture program.

== Work in print ==
=== Journalism ===
- Maire Aunaste is one of the founders of the magazine Kroonika and was its first editor-in-chief.
- In the magazine Naised, she wrote about her life in America. Later these stories were published as a book Viis aastat peidus (Five years in hiding).
- Has been a weekly columnist in Õhtuleht.
- A columnist in Maaleht.

=== Fiction ===
Maire Aunaste has written three books:

- "Iseennast kuulates" (Listening to yourself,) BNS, ISBN 9985-60-297-8 - The book is based on the texts of the Radio 2 broadcasts: "Only Love" and "Frankly about life". The tenet of this book is that absolutely all people want to be special.
- "Viis aastat peidus", (Five years in hiding,) Magazine Publishers Ltd. 2008, ISBN 978-9949-443-50-5 - Book one of the Estonian TV presenter's life in the United States. What life really means to be illegal, if there are no official residence and work permit? How to earn the daily bread procurement, who was known as the home television, but now the only mention of human rights worker in the primary? "After these experiences I know that now there is nothing that can degrade me." says the author herself.
- "Mitte ainult meestest", (Not only about men), 2009

== Awards ==
- Häädemeeste municipality Freeman
