= Eva Püssa =

Estonian stage, film, voice and television actress

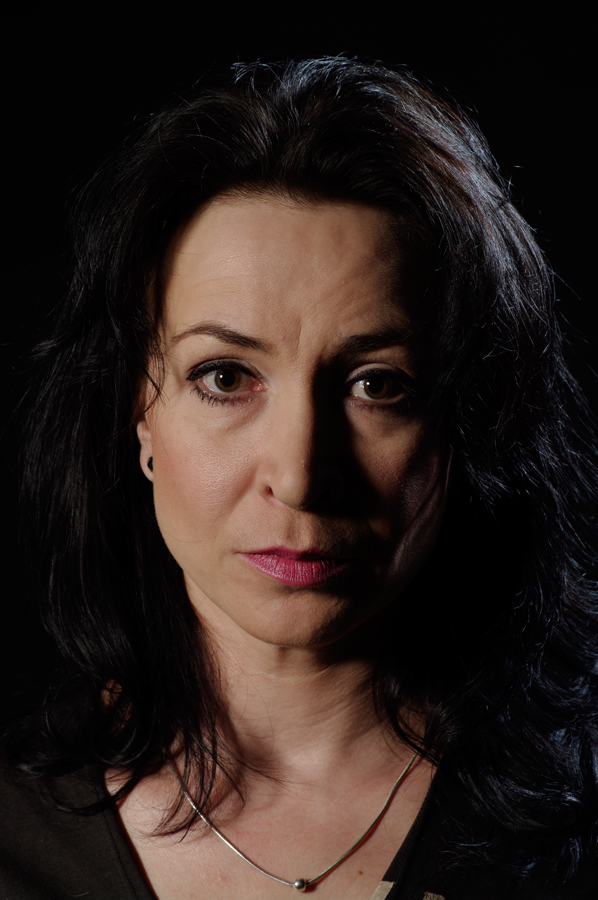
- Born: Eva Ütt; 16 June 1971 (age 54); Tartu, then part of Estonian SSR, Soviet Union
- Occupation: Actress
- Years active: 1998 – present
- Children: 2

Eva Püssa (born Eva Ütt; 16 June 1971) is an Estonian stage, film, voice and television actress and radio personality.

== Early life and education ==
Eva Püssa was born Eva Ütt in Tartu. Her father was Helmut-Endel Ütt and her mother's maiden name was Kalaus. She is the youngest of three siblings; her eldest sister is journalist Maire Aunaste and her next eldest sister is Tiina Prentsel. She attended Tartu 5 Secondary School (now, Tartu Tamme Gymnasium), graduating in 1990. Afterwards, she applied and was accepted to study at the EMA Higher Drama School (now, the Estonian Academy of Music and Theatre), graduating in 2000. Among her graduating classmates were actors Kersti Heinloo, Margus Prangel, Maarja Jakobson, Katrin Pärn, Tambet Tuisk, Piret Simson and directors Urmas Lennuk, Tiit Ojasoo and Vahur Keller.

== Stage career ==
Following her graduation from drama school, Püssa began an engagement as an actress at the Estonian State Puppet and Youth Theatre (NUKU Theatre) in Tallinn in 2000. She remained at the NUKU until 2003, becoming a freelance actress until 2010 when she became engaged at the Vanemuine theatre in Tartu. Püssa remained at the Vanemuine until August 2014 when she once again became a freelance actress. Throughout her stage career she has appeared in a number of roles in productions by such varied authors and playwrights as: Ronald Harwood, Ingmar Bergman, Tim Firth, Mati Unt, John Kander, and Richard Rodgers. As a freelance actress, she has appeared onstage at several theatres throughout Estonia, including: the Von Krahl Theatre, Theatre NO99, Arena Theatre, Rakvere Theatre, and the VAT Theatre.

== Television, film and radio ==
Eva Püssa's film debut was in the 2009 Tiiu-Ann Pello directed short film Kord aastas. She would go on to appear in a number of short films and provide voices for animated films. In 2012, she made her feature-length film debut as Inga in the Ain Mäeots directed and Kopli Theater Company and Exitfilm produced drama Deemonid, which focuses on the lives of three individuals who enter a casino and have to face their inner-demons. In 2018, she had a starring role as Marge, the winner of a ten million euro lottery, in the Toomas Kirss-directed drama Õigus õnnele.

Between 2007 and 2008, Püssa made two appearances as the character Anna on the popular Kanal 2 crime-drama Kelgukoerad. In 2012, she was cast as Helena on the TV3 comedy-drama Nurjatud tüdrukud; a role she would play for the duration of the series. In 2014, she also made an appearance on the Kanal 2 crime-drama series Viimane võmm, and the Kanal 2 comedy reality series Peitusemeistrid.

Eva Püssa has performed in a number of radio play productions. Among her more memorable roles was in a 2002 production of Andrus Kivirähk's Püha Graal. Since 2015, Püssa has hosted a talk radio program on Raadio 2 – Estonian Public Broadcasting (ERR).

== Personal life ==
Eva Püssa was married and is now divorced. She has two daughters, Marta and Sanna. She currently resides in Tallinn.
