= Aivar Õun =

Estonian politician (born 1959)

Aivar Õun (born 15 March 1959) is an Estonian politician. He was a member of the X Riigikogu, representing the Res Publica Party.

Aivar Õun was born in Rakvere. He graduated from the Estonian University of Life Sciences in 1982. From 2009 to 2017, he served as the mayor of Konguta.
