= Irja Aav =

Estonian actress

Irja Aav (née Irja Pilvet; 12 May 1944 – 6 August 1995) was an Estonian actress.

Aav was born in Tallinn. In 1964 she graduated from Estonian Drama Theatre's stage studio. She started working at the Estonian Drama Theatre in 1965. In addition to theatrical roles, she also appeared in several films.

From 1965 to 1974 she was married to the Estonian actor Tõnu Aav. The couple had two sons, the music producer and conductor Lauri Aav and the prop maker Ardi Aav.

Aav died in 1995 in Tallinn.

== Selected filmography ==
- 1970: Kolme katku vahel (role: Epp)
- 1972: Verekivi (role: first servant)
- 1988: Ma pole turist, ma elan siin (role: dispatcher Pille)
- 1991: Vana mees tahab koju
- 1992: Armastuse lahinguväljad (role: the bride's mother)
