= Vambola Kurg =

Estonian actor (1898–1981)

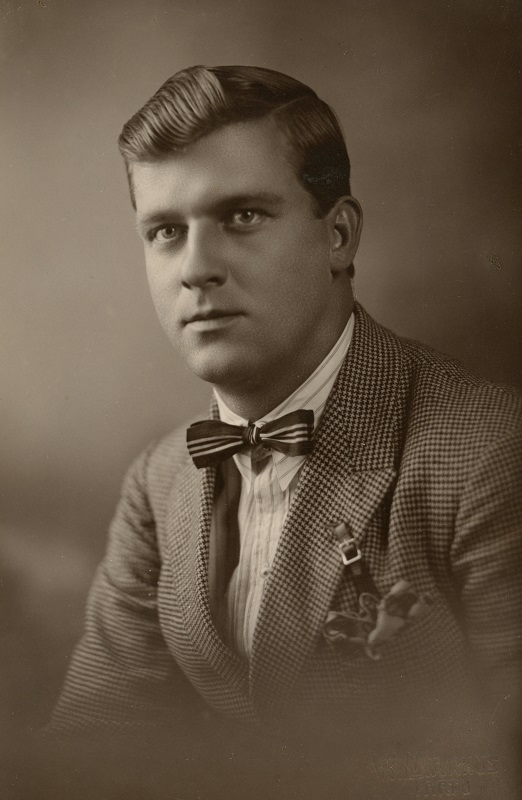
- Kurg c. 1928
- Born: 27 August 1898; Tartu, Governorate of Estonia, Russian Empire
- Died: 22 September 1981 (aged 83); Tallinn, then part of Estonian SSR, Soviet Union
- Occupation: Actor
- Years active: 1918–1971
- Spouse: Alma Kurg

Vambola Kurg (27 August 1898 in Tartu – 22 September 1981 in Tartu) was an Estonian actor.

In 1915 he graduated from Tartu City School. From 1918 until 1959, he worked at the Vanemuine theatre in Tartu. Besides theatre roles he played also in several films. Kurg died, aged 83, and was buried at Rõngu Cemetery.

== Filmography ==
- 1927: Noored kotkad (feature film; role: Unt, commandant of 1st Estonian force (Estonian: I Eesti väeülem Unt))
- 1930: Vahva sõdur Joosep Toots (feature film)
- 1931: Kas tunned maad ... (documentary film; role: officer)
