= Enn Toona =

Estonian actor and director

Enn Toona (13 January 1909 – 22 March 1973) was an Estonian actor and director.

Toona was born in Väinjärve. 1934-1935 he studied at Tartu Stage Art Studio (Estonian: Tartu Näitekunsti Stuudio). 1935–1936 he was an actor at Estonian Drama Theatre, 1936–1942 and 1943–1944 at Tallinna Töölisteater. 1947–1948 he was a director at Ugala Theatre. 1955-1957 he worked at Estonian Radio. 1964-1969 he was principal stage manager of Endla Theatre.

Toona died in 1973 in Tallinn.

== Theatre productions ==
- Ohlson's "Ehast koiduni" (1939)
- Korneitšuk's "Platon Kretšet" (1941 and 1965)
- Goldon's "Kahe isanda teener" (1942 in Vanemuine Theatre)
