= Õun =

Family name

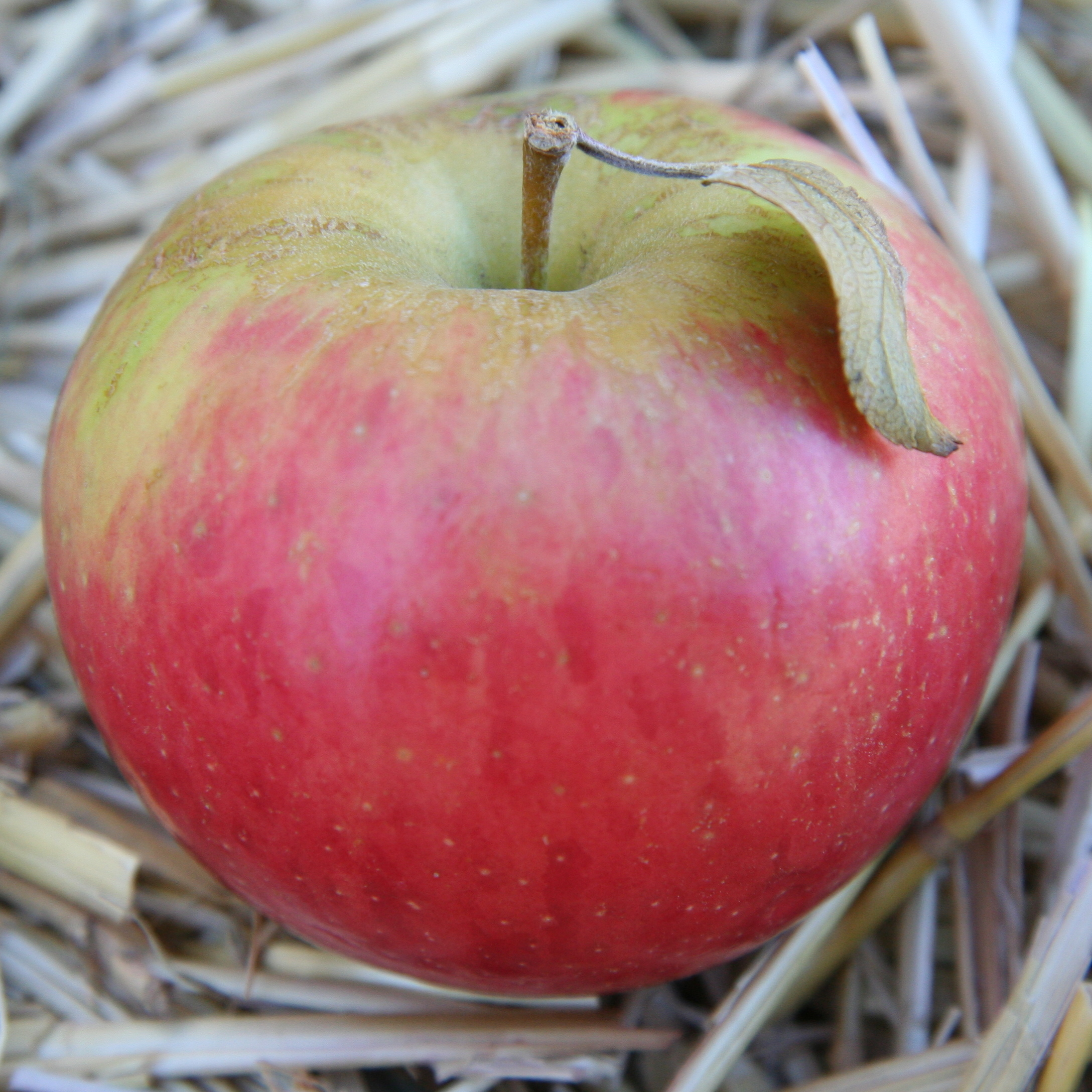

Origin
- Language: Estonian
- Meaning: apple
- Region of origin: Estonia

Õun is an Estonian surname meaning "apple". As of 1 January 2020, 292 men and 338 women have the surname Õun in Estonia. Õun ranks 152nd for men and 143rd for women in the distribution of surnames in the country. The surname Õun is the most common in Saare County, where 27.73 per 10,000 inhabitants of the county bear the surname. Notable people bearing the surname Õun include:

- Aivar Õun (born 1959), Estonian politician
- Elmar Õun (1906–1977), Estonian writer
- Jan Õun (born 1977), Estonian footballer
- Mati Õun (1942–2024), Estonian military historian and sportsman
- Ülo Õun (1940–1988), Estonian sculptor
- Voldemar Õun (1893–1986), Estonian civil servant and writer
