= Mait Lepik =

Estonian actor (born 1968)

Mait Lepik (born 23 September 1968) is an Estonian actor.

Lepik was born in Tallinn. Besides theatre roles he has played also in several Estonian and Finnish films, television series and advertisements.

== Filmography ==
- 1991: Rahu tänav (feature film)
- 1991: Rist (feature film)
- 2000: Me saame hakkama (television series)
- 2006: Hundi agoonia (feature film)
- 2011: Surnuaiavahi tütar (feature film)
- 2017: Sangarid (feature film)
