= Õunapuu =

Family name

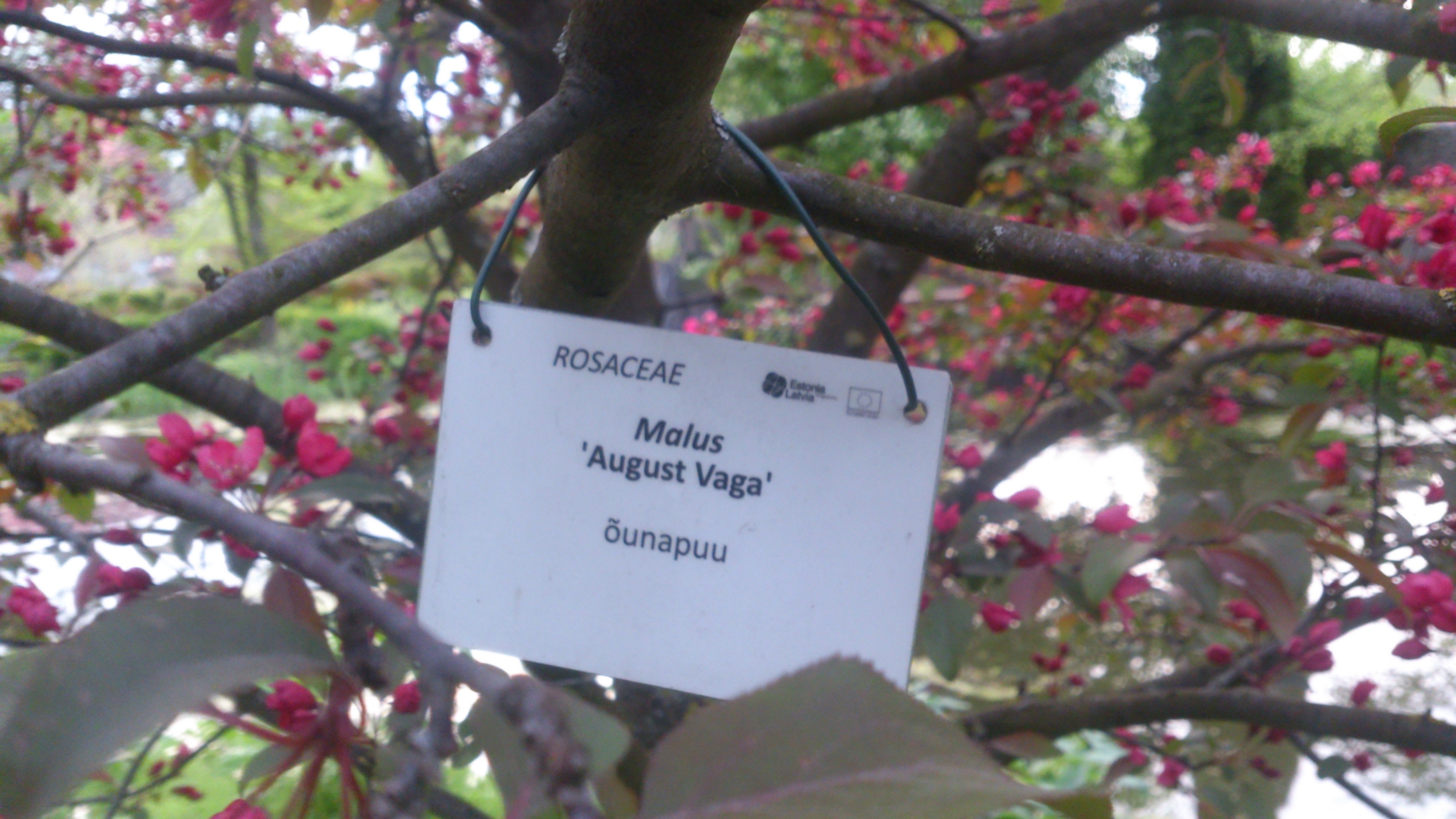

Origin
- Language: Estonian
- Meaning: apple tree (Malus domestica)
- Region of origin: Estonia

Other names
- Variant forms: Õunpuu, Õunap

Õunapuu is an Estonian surname meaning "apple tree"; a compound of õun (apple) and puu (tree). As of 1 January 2020, 337 men and 342 women in Estonia have the surname Õunapuu. Õunapuu is ranked as the 129th most common surname for men in Estonia, and the 138th most common surname for Estonian women. The surname Õunapuu is the most common in Jõgeva County, where 16.45 per 10,000 inhabitants of the county bear the surname. Notable people bearing the surname Õunapuu include:

- Anton Õunapuu (1887–1919), Estonian physical education teacher, soldier, and founder of the Boy Scouts movement in Estonia
- Egert Õunapuu (born 2005), Estonian footballer
- Enn Õunapuu (born 1949), Estonian economist
- Ervin Õunapuu (born 1956), Estonian prose writer, screenwriter and director, playwright, and artist
- Harri Õunapuu (born 1947), Estonian politician
- Jaan Õunapuu (born 1958), Estonian politician
- Lauri Õunapuu (born 1976), Estonian musician (Metsatöll)
- Madis Õunapuu (1969–2012), Estonian wrestler and sumo wrestler
- Villem Õunapuu (1917–2007), Estonian violinist and composer
