= Ruth Peramets-Püss =

Estonian actress and television presenter

Ruth Peramets-Püss (since 1968 Peramets; 28 November 1927 Tallinn – 3 August 2005 Tallinn) was an Estonian actress and television presenter.

From 1955 until 1984, she worked at Eesti Televisioon (ETV) as a presenter. Popular were children's programmes where she acted as tädi Ruth ('aunt Ruth'). She played also in several films.

== Awards ==
- 1978: Meritorious Artist of the Estonian SSR.
- 2005: Order of the White Star, V class.
- 2005: Estonian Television Lifetime Achievement Award

== Filmography ==
- Andruse õnn (1955)
- Jahid merel (1956)
