= Märt Visnapuu =

Estonian actor (1962–2025)

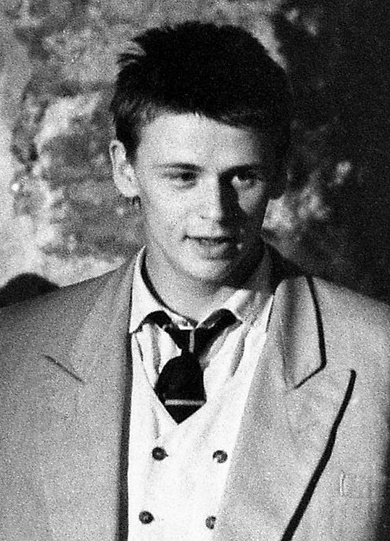
Visnapuu in 1983

Märt Visnapuu (23 April 1962 – 27 March 2025) was an Estonian actor.

== Life and career ==
Visnapuu was born in Tallinn on 23 April 1962. In 1984 he graduated from the Tallinn State Conservatory's Performing Arts Department. From 1984 until 1992, he was an actor at the Estonian Drama Theatre, and from 1993 until 1996, at Ugala Theatre. From 1996 he was a freelance actor. Besides theatre roles he played also in several films and television series. Visnapuu died on 27 March 2025, at the age of 62.

== Filmography ==
- 1983: Küljetuul
- 1984: Hundiseaduse aegu
- 1991: Vana mees tahab koju
- 1998: Kired
- 2011: Surnuaiavahi tütar
