= Valter Soosõrv =

Estonian actor, director and theatre historian

Valter Soosõrv (also Sooserv; 3 April 1903 – 26 June 1969) was an Estonian actor, director and theatre historian.

Soosõrv was born in Vahastu. In 1927 he graduated from the Drama Studio theatre school. 1922-1925 he was a choir singer at Estonia Theatre. 1925–1927 he played at Estonian Drama Studio Theatre, and 1927–1928 in Endla Theatre. 1932-1933 he was the head of Ugala Theatre. 1948-1951 he was the head of Estonian Theatre and Music Museum. Besides theatre roles he played also in several films.

Soosõrv died in 1969 in Tallinn.

== Filmography ==
- 1960: Näitleja Joller (television feature film)
- 1961: Laulu sõber (feature film)
- 1968: Libahunt (feature film)
