= Tõnu Aav =

Estonian actor (1939–2019)

Tõnu Aav (21 January 1939 – 14 August 2019) was an Estonian stage, film, TV, and radio actor.

Aav was born in Tallinn and graduated from the Estonian Academy of Music and Theatre in 1961. From 1961 he performed at the Estonian Drama Theatre in Tallinn. He played in dozens of films and twenty screenplays and also recorded a number of radio play and audio CDs (including Uncle Remus stories and Alice in Wonderland) as well as a recurring role as Feliks Viss on the ETV dramatic series Õnne 13.

From 1965 until 1974, Aav was married to the actress Irja Aav (née Pilvet). The couple had two sons: the music producer and conductor Lauri Aav and the prop maker Ardi Aav.

== Awards ==
Aav's awards include:

- 1971: Honorary title of Honored Actor of the Estonian SSR (Estonian SSR People's Artist)
- 1992: Meie Mats Humor Prize
- 2001: Class 5 Order of the White Star
- 2010: Oskar Luts Humor Prize
