= Amalie Konsa =

Estonian actress and singer

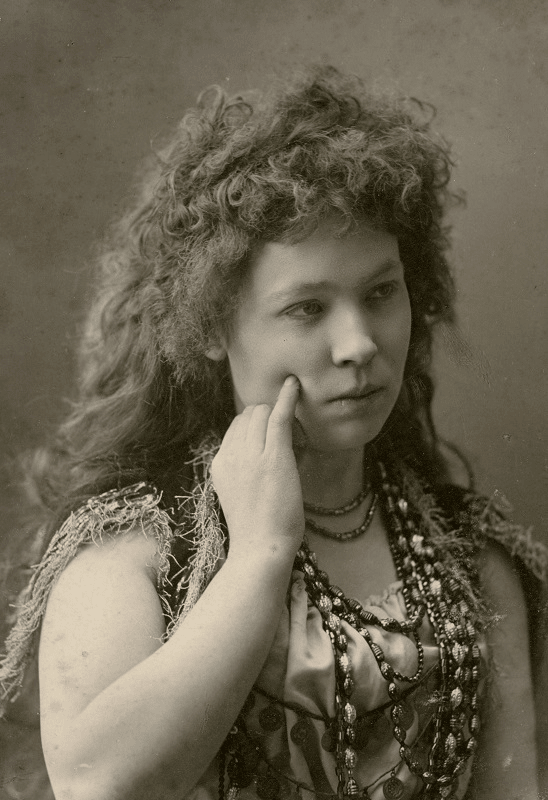
- in 1903
- Born: Amalie-Luise Konts; 10 March 1873; Raadi Parish, Governorate of Livonia, Russian Empire
- Died: 19 July 1949 (aged 76); Tartu, then part of Estonian SSR, Soviet Union
- Other name: Brigitta
- Occupations: Actress, singer
- Known for: "grandmother of the Estonian theatre"

Amalie Konsa (also known as Brigitta; 10 March 1873 – 19 July 1949), was an Estonian stage actress and singer usually based in Tartu. She was known as the "grandmother of the Estonian theatre"

== Life ==
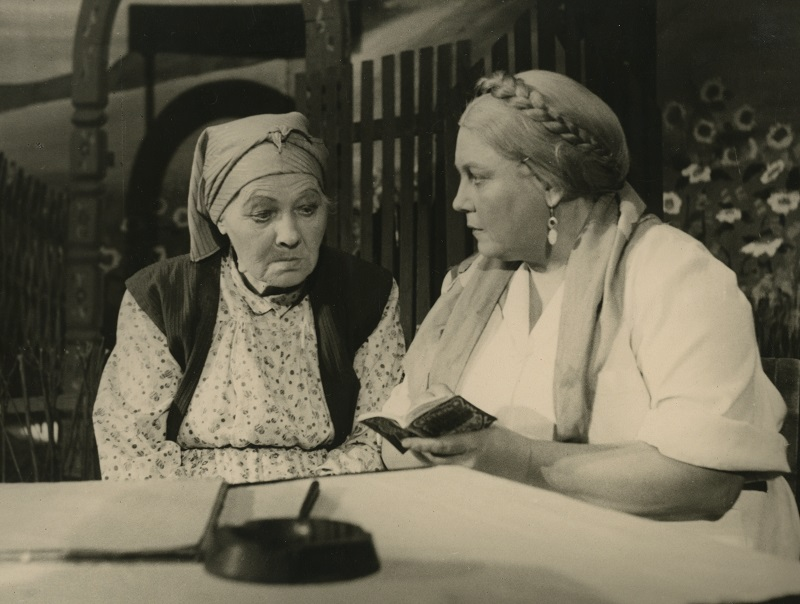
Amalie Konsa and Alli Tammemets acting in 1948

Konsa was born Amalie-Luise Konts in Raadi Parish (now, Tartu Parish) in 1873. She came from a large family and received only primary education at St. John's Church, Tartu.

She started acting in 1886 in the important Estonian culture group of the Vanemuine Choir. She was chosen by August Wiera to join his troupe and she then played on and off from 1906 to 1949 with the Vanemuine. In an interview when she was 70 she said that acting had been the "greatest joy in her life". She was the only actress employed by the theatre leader August Wiera who was re-employed to join the later Karl Menning troupe. She was known as the "grandmother of the Estonian theatre" and she appeared on stage over 50 years whilst nearly always living in Tartu.

In 1927 she had played the mother of one of the protagonists in the Estonian film Noored kotkad ("Young Eagles"). The film was set against the background of when the Bolsheviks interfered with the Estonian War of Independence. The film was digitally restored in 2008.

Konsa died in a bus accident in Tartu in 1949. She has a plaque to her memory on the house where she lived in Ülikooli 11 in Tartu. The incorporated sculpture is by Elmar Rebane.

The Estonian Theatre and Music Museum has a collection of her pictures.

== Awards and honours ==
- Honorary actress (1936)
- Gold badge of merit of the Estonian Association of Actors 1936.
- Meritorious artist of the Estonian SSR (1948)
