= Albert Üksip =

Estonian actor and botanist

Albert Aleksander Üksip (8 December 1886 – 10 August 1966) was an Estonian actor, botanist (hieraciologist) and translator. He published a part of his works in Russian as Альберт Яковлевич Юксип, so besides the correct form Üksip there exist several variants of his name: Ueksip, Juxip, Juksip and Üxip.

Üksip was born in Narva. In 1902 he graduated from Narva city school. Between 1902 and 1923 he worked at Kreenholm Manufacturing Company. From 1923 to 1949 he was an actor of the national Estonian theatre "Estonia". After his retirement he worked on the genus Hieracium, publishing two monographs and several smaller papers. He authored several hundred names in this difficult genus, including both new species he described and new nomenclatural combinations.

There exists a documentary film about him, dated from 1963.

Üksip died in 1966 in Tallinn.

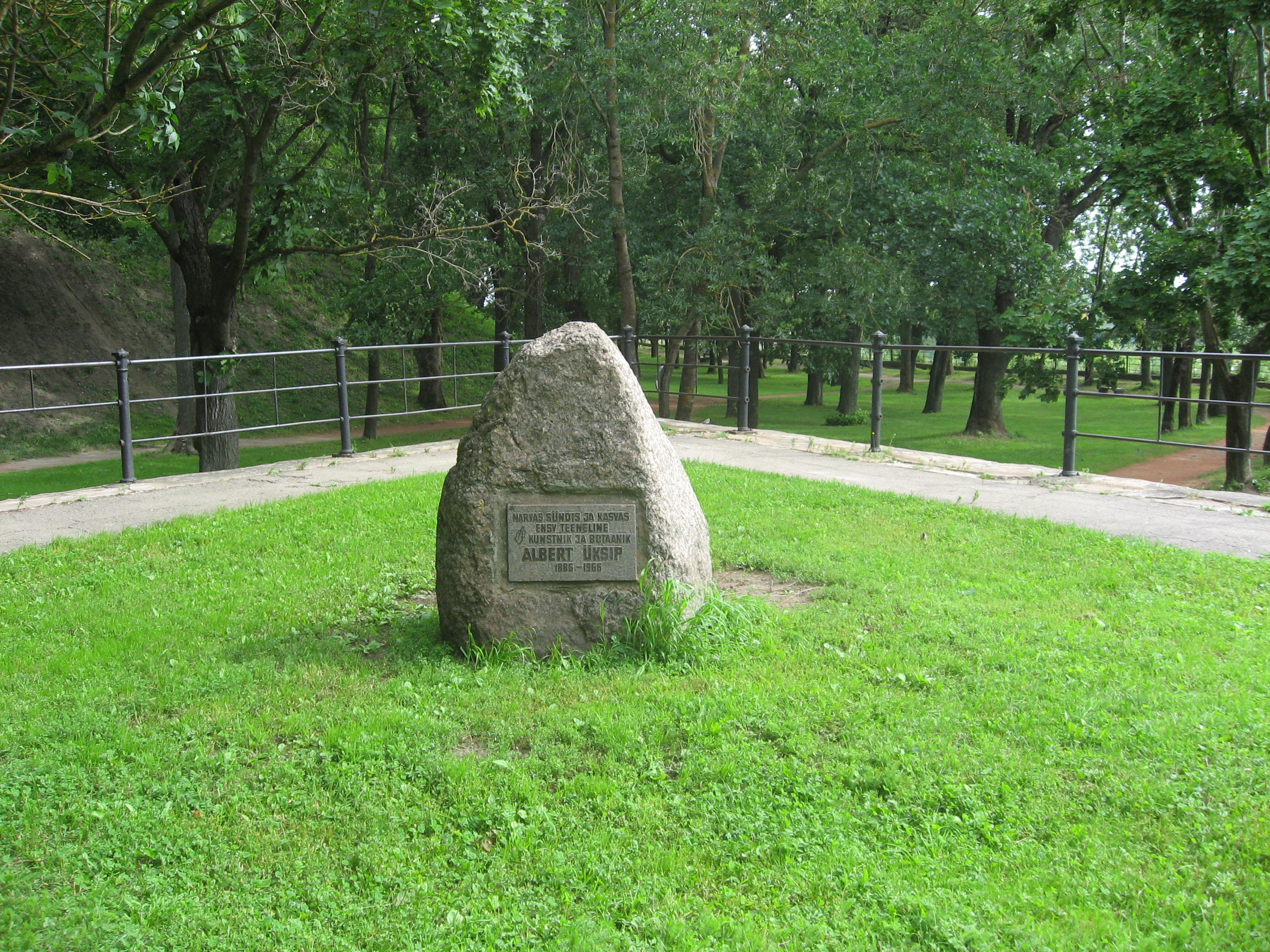
Albert Üksip memorial stone in Narva
