= Eero Neemre =

Estonian theatre actor and director

Eero Neemre (until 1936 Ernst Nüssik; 22 March 1905 Ropka Parish, Tartu County – 28 September 1994 Viljandi) was an Estonian theatre actor and theatre director.

In 1926 he graduated from Lulu Kitzberg-Pappel's Theatre School. 1928 he worked at Tartu Töölisteater (since 1930 its artistic leader). 1932-1940 he worked at Vanemuine theatre in Tartu. From 1943 until 1991, he worked at Ugala theatre in Viljandi and was the theatre's principal artistic director from 1943 until 1945.

== Awards ==
- 1967: Meritorious Artist of the Estonian SSR
- 1970: Honorary Letter of the Presidium of the Supreme Soviet of the Estonian SSR
- 1979: Estonian SSR Theatre Association Prize

== Productions of plays ==
- Antson's "Lapsed" (1929)
- Raudsepp's "Mikumärdi" (1930)
- Voltaire's "Metsmees" (1932)
