= Heino Torga =

Estonian theatre director and actor

Heino Torga (18 March 1933 Narva – 9 September 2012 Tallinn) was an Estonian theatre director and actor.

In 1955 he graduated from Estonian Drama Theatre's learning studio, and 1967 Leningrad State Institute of Theatre, Music and Cinema. From 1958 until 1962, he was an actor, from 1967 until 1970, a director and from 1970 until 1979, the principal stage manager-chief of Ugala Theatre in Viljandi. From 1981 until 1986, he worked at Tallinna Linnahall. From 1986 until 1993, he was an actor at Vanalinnastuudio. In 1993 he became a freelance actor. Besides stage roles he has also acted on films and in television series.

== Filmography ==
- Vernanda (1988)
- Noid (1988)
- Regina (1989)
- Äratus (1989)
- Miss Marpleʹi lood (1990)
- Tule tagasi, Lumumba (1992)
- Tulivesi (1994)
- Wikmani poisid (1995)
- Kohtumine tundmatuga (2005)
- Kormoranid ehk nahkpükse ei pesta (2011)
