= Eva Meil =

Estonian actress

Eva Meil (beginning in 1940, Eva Malmsten; 11 September 1917 Tallinn – 10 January 2002 Tallinn) was an Estonian actress.

Meil began her stage career at age ten in the role of Young Tiina in a production of August Kitzberg's Libahunt. Meil graduated from the Drama Studio in Tallinn in 1946. From 1937 until 1941 and from 1944 until 1949, she worked at Estonian Drama Theatre. From 1949 until 1975 she worked at Estonian National Opera as an actress and operetta performer. Besides theatrical roles she has also appeared in several films.

Meil was married to actor Franz Malmsten. Their son was actor Rein Malmsten. Their grandson was actor Mait Malmsten and great-grandchildren include actors Franz and Hugo Malmsten. She died in Tallinn, aged 84.

== Filmography ==
- 1975 Jõmm (role: Berrypicker)
- 1971 Teatriöö (role: ?)
- 1979 Siin me oleme! (role: Janne)
