= Aleks Sats =

Estonian actor and director (1914–1992)

Alexs Sats
- Born: Aleksander Sats; 21 August 1914; Mariinsk, Tomsk Governorate, Russian Empire
- Died: 15 May 1992 (aged 77); Viljandi, Estonia
- Education: Tartu Stage Art Studio
- Occupations: Director; actor

Aleks Sats (born Aleksander Sats; 21 August 1914 – 15 May 1992) was an Estonian director, writer and actor.

== Early life and education ==
Aleks Sats was born on 21 August 1914 in Mariinsk, Tomsk governorate in the Russian Empire. Aleks Sats then moved to Tartu where he graduated in 1933 from Miina Härma Gymnasium. In 1937, he graduated from Tartu Stage Art Studio (Estonian: Tartu Näitekunsti Stuudio).

== Career ==
From 1938 to 1940, he worked in the construction industry around Tallinn where he also worked in puppet productions for the youth. From 1940 to 1949, he worked in several theatres including Ugala Theatre in Viljandi. In Ugala Theatre, her served as the chief of the theatre from 1944 to 1952; 1952 to 1971 its principal stage manager, and 1971 to 1979 as a director.

== Filmography and repertoire ==
Year	Title	Role	Notes
1941	Lumekuninganna	Ronk	
1942	Kahe isanda teener	Florindo	
1945	Mirandolina	Markii de Forlipopoli	
1945	Säärane mulk	Erastu Enn	
1946	Tagatipu Tiisenoosen	Viilup	
1946	Tederi Mereingel	Kondikoristaja	
1947	Windsori lõbusad naised	Slender	
1947	Elu tsitadellis	Richard Miilas	
1949	Süüta süüdlased	Neznamov	
1963	Jäljed		Only film role

== Awards ==
- 1958: Estonian SSR merited art personnel
- 1964: Estonian SSR merited people's artist

== Productions of plays ==
- Chekhov's "Kosjas" (1945)
- Ostrovski's "Mets" (1949)
- Sobko's "Teise rinde taga" (1950)
