= Alfred Mering =

Estonian actor and theatre director

Alfred Mering (until 1936 Meering; 26 August 1903 – 24 April 1988) was an Estonian actor and theatre director.

Mering was birn in Tallinn. In 1927 he graduated from Estonian Drama Studio's theatre school. 1921-1924 he was a choir singer at Estonia Theatre. 1927-1936 (intermittently) he worked at Ugala Theatre. 1926-1929 and 1967-1984 he worked at Estonian Drama Theatre. 1932-1940 he worked at Vanemuine Theatre. 1946-1965 he was the artistic manager of Estonia Theatre. Mering died in 1988 in Tallinn.

Awards:

- 1963: Estonian SSR merited artist

== Productions of plays ==
- Faiko's "Õpetaja Bubus" (1927 in Ugala Theatre)
- Kálmán's "Mariza" (1929 and 1936 in Ugala Theatre)
- Kitzberg's and Simm's "Kosjasõit" (1929 in Ugala Theatre)
