= Eduard Tinn =

Estonian actor and theatre director

Eduard Tinn (18 January 1899 – 27 March 1968) was an Estonian actor and theatre director.

Tinn was born in Hummuli Parish. He passed the examinations of as an assistant pharmacist at the Imperial Academy of Military Medicine in Saint Petersburg in 1917. He then studied pharmacy at the University of Tartu between 1917 and 1918 and was front-line pharmacist from 1919 and 1920 during the Estonian War of Independence. In 1927, he graduated from Drama Studio's theatre school in Tallinn.

From 1927 until 1932, and from 1944 until 1968, he was an actor in Estonian Drama Theatre. Between 1932 and 1934, he was an actor in Estonia Theatre. From 1936 until 1940, he was the head of Ugala Theatre.

Besides stage roles he played also in several films and radio theatre.

Tinn died in 1968 in Tallinn. His son was actor Olev Tinn.

== Awards ==
- 1947: Meritorious Artist of the Estonian SSR
- 1949: Soviet Estonia Prize

== Filmography ==
- 1947: Elu tsitadellis (feature film; role: Lillak, writer)
- 1960: Perekond Männard (feature film; role: railway worker)
- 1966: Tütarlaps mustas (feature film)
- 1985: Naerata ometi (feature film; role Tauri's father)
