= Franz Malmsten =

Estonian actor

- Born: November 6, 1905; Narva, Saint Petersburg Governorate, Russian Empire
- Died: February 6, 1967 (aged 61); Tallinn, then part of Estonian SSR, Soviet Union
- Burial place: Metsakalmistu; 59°28′4″N 24°51′53″E
- Occupation: Actor
- Spouse: Eva Malmsten

Notes
- "Franz Malmsten (1905 –1967) näitleja". www.kalmistud.ee. Estonian Cemeteries Portal.

Franz Malmsten (6 November 1905 Narva – 6 February 1967 Tallinn) was an Estonian actor.

From 1925 to 1937 he worked at the Narva Theatre. From 1937 to 1967 he worked at Estonian Drama Theatre. He participated also on operas and operettas, and he also acted in films.

== Awards ==
- 1964: Estonian SSR merited artist

== Personal life ==
He was married to actress Eva Meil. His grandchild is the actor Mait Malmsten.

== Filmography ==
- 1951: "Valgus Koordis" (feature film; in the role: Janson)
- 1956: "Tagahoovis"
- 1957: "Pöördel"
- 1960: "Näitleja Joller"
- 1965: "Külmale maale"
- 1965: "Me olime 18-aastased"
- 1970: "Valge laev"
