= Margus Saar =

Estonian television journalist and producer

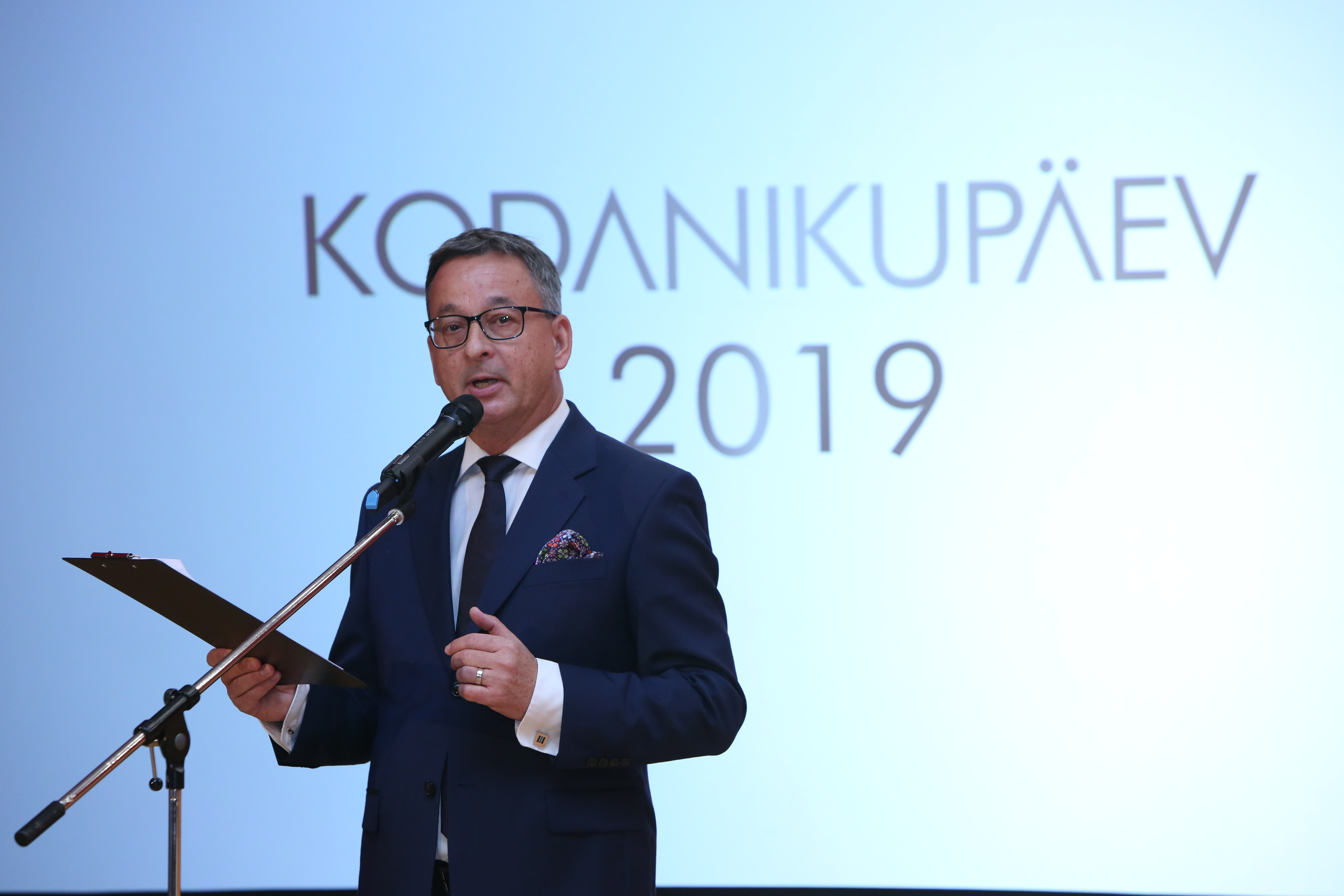
Margus Saar in 2019

Margus Saar (born 20 April 1966 in Tallinn) is an Estonian television journalist and producer. He was felicitated with the Order of the White Star in 2016.
