= Angelika Mikk =

Estonian singer and actress

Angelika Mikk (née Tendermann; born on 8 September 1973, Tallinn) is an Estonian opera singer and actress.

In 2004, she graduated from Estonian Academy of Music and Theatre.

She made her opera debut in 2003 at Estonian National Opera. Since 2003, she has been a freelance opera singer.

She has also participated on several Estonian television series, including, Padjaklubi, Kättemaksukontor, Tupiktänava mehed and Pilvede all.

== Opera roles ==
- Juliet (Britten's "The Little Sweep" (2003))
- Sofia (Rossini's "Signor Bruschino")
- Lucy (Menotti's "Telephone")
