= Estonian Culture Film =

Film production company based in Estonia

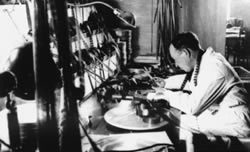
Konstantin Märska at the 'Estonian Culture Film' in 1936

The Estonian Culture Film (Estonian: Eesti Kultuurfilm) was a state-subsidized movie studio established in Estonia in 1931 by the Ministry of Culture. During the first years of existence, the studio mostly distributed films.

The foundation for the professional Estonian film industry was created by training filmmakers in Germany, where the professional production equipment for the studio was also purchased. The studio's sound equipment from the 1930s is preserved in the Estonian Film Archives and is still in good working order even today.

In 1936, Culture Film was transferred to the authority of the Ministry of Internal Affairs, at the same time the Estonian Film Archives were established. Thanks to the state archive, many of the movies produced by the Culture Film from 1936 to 1940 have survived, even though during World War II many film negatives were destroyed.

The Estonian Culture Film was mostly producing popular-scientific documentaries that recorded everyday life in Estonia. The titles of movies included Aviation show in Tallinn 28.08.1938, International Sailing Yacht Race in Tallinn 10.-12. July 1938, Views of Beautiful Viljandimaa, Tallinn Before and Now, Pictures of Saku, etc.

Some of the major filmmakers working for the Estonian Culture Film was Konstantin Märska. and Theodor Luts.
