= Viive Aamisepp =

Estonian actress (1936–2023)

Viive Aamisepp (since 1969 Viive Käro; 21 April 1936 – 22 July 2023) was a renowned Estonian stage and film actress, best known for her long career at Rakvere Theatre and contributions to Estonian performing arts.

== Biography ==
Viive Aamisepp was born on 21 April 1936 in Haapsalu. She graduated from Tallinna 2. secondary school in 1956 and later studied the English language at the University of Tartu from 1958 to 1961. During her university years, she participated in the Tombi-nimeline Rahvateater amateur theatre in Tallinn.

She was working as an economist in Tallinn between 1957 and 1961. She also took part in an amateur drama group called Tombi-nlime Rahvateater in the Tallinn. Heino Kulvere, the theatre director noticed her talent and offered her a position in Rakvere Theatre as a professional actress.

From 1961 to 2009 she worked at Rakvere Theatre, taking on over 100 different roles throughout the 48 years. She has also taken part in radio plays including Kividest tõuseb leek (1964). In 1965 she became a member of the Estonian Theatre Union and in 1993 a member of the Estonian Association of Actors.

Aamisepp was married to actor Volli Käro. She died on 22 July 2023, at the age of 87.

== Honours ==
- Honored Artist of the Estonian SSR (1980)
- Lääne-Viru County Coat of Arms Insignia (2006)
- Rakvere Crown Insignia (2007)

== Roles ==
1961

- "Romeo, Julia ja pimedus" – Ester
- "Kõik jääb inimestele" – Ziina
- "Politseitund" – Mitzi
