= Arnold Vaino =

Estonian actor and director

Arnold Vaino (26 June 1900 – 15 March 1960) was an Estonian actor and director.

Vaino was born in Tartu. From 1921 to 1932, he was an actor at Vanemuine Theatre and from 1932 to 1941, he worked at Estonia Theatre. Besides theatre roles he played also in films.

Vaino died in 1960 in Tallinn.

== Filmography ==
- 1927 Noored kotkad (feature film; role: student Tammekänd)
- 1930 Vahva sõdur Joosep Toots (feature film; co-director and the role: Joosep Toots)
- 1931 Kas tunned maad? (documentary film; role: ?)
