= Toomas Uibo =

Estonian aviation specialist, singer and politician

Toomas Uibo (born 29 August 1971) is an Estonian aviation specialist, singer and politician. In 2023, he was elected a member of the XV Riigikogu, representing the Estonia 200 party.

Uibo was born in Tallinn. He is the son of actor and theatre director Väino Uibo and cultural organizer Riina Uibo. He has a brother, Märt Uibo. He was formerly in a long-term relationship with politician and civil servant Liisa Pakosta, with whom he has two children. He has a son with his current partner.
