= Toomas Hussar =

Estonian film director

Toomas Hussar (born 1 May 1962 in Tallinn) is an Estonian actor, film and theatre director, playwright and dramaturge.

From 1986 to 1988 he studied at Tallinn State Conservatory in acting Estonian: näitlemine speciality.

== Selected filmography ==
- 1994 "Tulivesi" (feature film; role: student)
- 1999 "Sellised kolm lugu: Kõrbekuu" (feature film; role: visitor)
- 2007 "Jan Uuspõld läheb Tartusse" (feature film; role: sacristan)
- 2007 "Kuhu põgenevad hinged" (feature film; role: businessman)
- 2012 "Seenelkäik" (feature film; director and scenarist)
- 2016 "Luuraja ja luuletaja" (feature film; director and scenarist)
