= Väino Uibo =

Estonian actor (1942–2024)

- Born: 7 October 1942; Tartu, Estonia
- Died: 24 January 2024 (aged 81); Estonia
- Education: Estonian Academy of Music and Theatre
- Occupations: Actor, director, theatre leader
- Years active: 1970-2024
- Spouse: Riina Uibo (divorced)
- Children: 2, including Toomas Uibo

Väino Uibo (7 October 1942 – 24 January 2024) was an Estonian actor, singer, director and theatre leader.

== Life and career ==
In 1970 he graduated from the Tallinn State Conservatory Performing Arts Department. Between 1970–1975 and 1977–1981 he was an actor at Vanemuine theatre, between 1981–1989 at Ugala Theatre.

From 1998 to 2001, he was the head of the Kuressaare Town Theatre (Estonian: Kuressaare Linnateater). Besides theatre roles he appeared also in four films.

From 1993 until 1998, he was the mayor of Elva.

== Personal life and death ==
Uibo was married to cultural organizer Riina Uibo, with whom he had two sons, including singer and politician Toomas Uibo. In 1989, the family relocated to Sweden. Uibo returned to Estonia in 1992, following the Estonian Restoration of Independence.

Uibo died on 24 January 2024, at the age of 81.

== Filmography ==
- 1971: Tuuline rand (feature film; role: Jaan)
- 1972: Väike reekviem suupillile (feature film; role: Heiki)
- 1976: Aeg elada, aeg armastada (feature film; role: Silver)
- 1984: Kevad südames (television film)
