= Õunpuu =

Surname list

Õunpuu is an Estonian surname. Notable people with the surname include:

- Cindy Õunpuu (born 1966), Canadian-Estonian swimmer
- Kethy Õunpuu (born 1987), Estonian footballer
- Veiko Õunpuu (born 1972), Estonian film director and screenwriter
- Vello Õunpuu (1943–2021), Estonian rally driver
