= Ugala =

Theatre in Estonia

Coordinates: 58.362013°N 25.588253°E

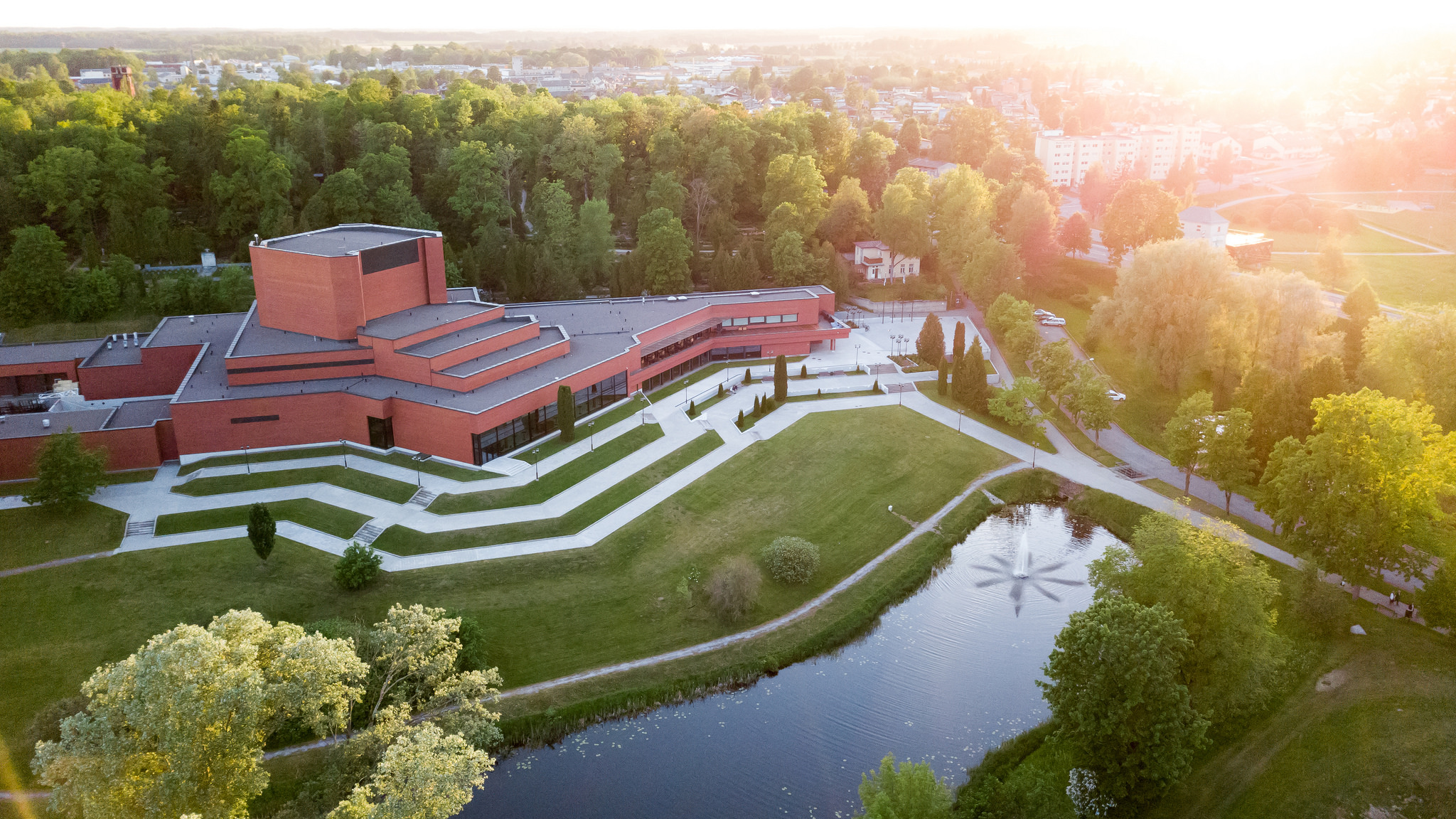
Ugala theatre

Ugala is a theatre in Viljandi, Estonia.

The theatre was founded in 1920 opening on January 10 of that year. The first production was Oscar Wilde's "Salome".

== Ugala's Artistic Directors ==
- 1925 - 1926: Andres Särev
- 1926 – 1928: Eduard Lemberg
- 1928 – 1932: Alfred Mering
- 1932 – 1933: Valter Soosõrv
- 1933 – 1934: Karl Merits
- 1934 – 1936: Alfred Mering
- 1936 – 1941: Eduard Tinn
- 1942 – 1943: Jullo Talpsepp
- 1943 – 1945: Eero Neemre
- 1945 – 1947: Karl Ader
- 1947 – 1948: Enn Toona
- 1949 – 1970: Aleks Sats
- 1970 – 1979: Heino Torga
- 1979 – 1983: Jaan Tooming
- 1983 – 1988: Jaak Allik
- 1989 – 1991: Kalju Komissarov
- 1991 – 1995: Jaak Allik
- 1995 – 1998: Andres Lepik
- 1998 – 2000: Andres Noormets
- 2000 – 2002: Jaak Allik
- 2002 - 2003, 2009: Peeter Tammearu
- 2002 - 2009: artistic director Peter Tammearu (theater director since 2003)
- 2009 - 2012: head of the theater Hillar Sein and head stage director Indrek Sammul
- 2012 - 2013: head of the theater Heiti Pakk and head stage director Margus Kasterpalu
- 2014 - 2019: theater director Kristiina Alliksaar and creative director Ott Aardam
- 2019 - : Tanel Jonas
