= Tõnu =

Male given name

- Gender: Male
- Language: Estonian

Origin
- Region of origin: Estonia

Other names
- Nickname: Tõnn
- Related names: Tõnis, Tõnn

Tõnu is an Estonian masculine given name, a version of Anthony.

People named Tõnu include:

- Tõnu Aare (1953–2021), musician
- Tõnu Aav (1939–2019), actor
- Tõnu Anton (born 1953), politician and judge
- Tõnu Aru (1935–2020), film director
- Tõnu Endrekson (born 1979), rower
- Tõnu Haljand (1945–1997), skier
- Tõnu Kaalep (born 1966), playwright, designer and critic
- Tõnu Kalam, Estonian-American orchestral pianist and conductor
- Tõnu Kaljuste (born 1953), conductor
- Tõnu Kalvet (born 1970), journalist and politician (:et)
- Tõnu Kark (born 1947), actor
- Tõnu Kauba (born 1952), physician and politician
- Tõnu Kaukis (born 1956), track and field athlete and coach
- Tõnu Kilgas (1954–2021), actor and singer
- Tõnu Kõiv (born 1968), politician
- Tõnu Kõrvits (born 1969), composer
- Tõnu-Reid Kukk (1939–2011), politician
- Tõnu Laanemäe (born 1977), architect (:et)
- Tõnu Laigu (born 1956), architect
- Tõnu Lehtsaar (born 1960), psychologist and professor
- Tõnu Lepik (born 1946), long jumper
- Tõnu Luik (1941–2019), philosopher
- Tõnu Maarand (born 1940), sculptor
- Tõnu Mellik (1934–1993), architect
- Tõnu Mikiver (1943–2017), actor
- Tõnu Möls (1939–2019), mathematician and biologist
- Tõnu Naissoo (born 1951), composer and pianist
- Tõnu Õim (born 1941), correspondence chess grandmaster
- Tõnu Oja (ecologist) (born 1955), ecologist
- Tõnu Oja (born 1958), actor
- Tõnu Õnnepalu (born 1962), poet and author
- Tõnu Ots (born 1941), psychologist (:et)
- Tõnu Parming (1941–1998), Estonian-American sociologist, historian and journalist
- Tõnu Pedaru (born 1962), journalist and singer (:et)
- Tõnu Prima (1902–1992), clergyman (:et)
- Tõnu Puu (1936–2020), economist
- Tõnu Raadik (born 1957), actor and composer
- Tõnu Reim (1853–1938), horticulturist (:et)
- Tõnu Saar (1944–2022), actor
- Tõnu Samuel (born 1972), white hat hacker
- Tõnu Sepp (born 1946), musician, teacher, instrument maker
- Tõnu Seero (1957–1998), writer and journalist
- Tõnu Tepandi (born 1948), actor and singer
- Tõnu Tõniste (born 1967), sailor
- Tõnu Trubetsky (born 1963), punk musician, writer and anarchist
- Tõnu Tuvikene (1952–2010), astrophysicist and mathematician
- Tõnu Viik (astronomer) (born 1939), astronomer
- Tõnu Viik (philosopher) (born 1968), philosopher
- Tõnu Virve (1946–2019), theatre and film designer and artist, producer and director
- Tõnu Walk (?–1898), first Estonian manor owner

== See also ==
- Ton (given name)
- Tona (name)
- Tonu (disambiguation)
