= Viiu Härm =

Estonian actress, poet, author and translator

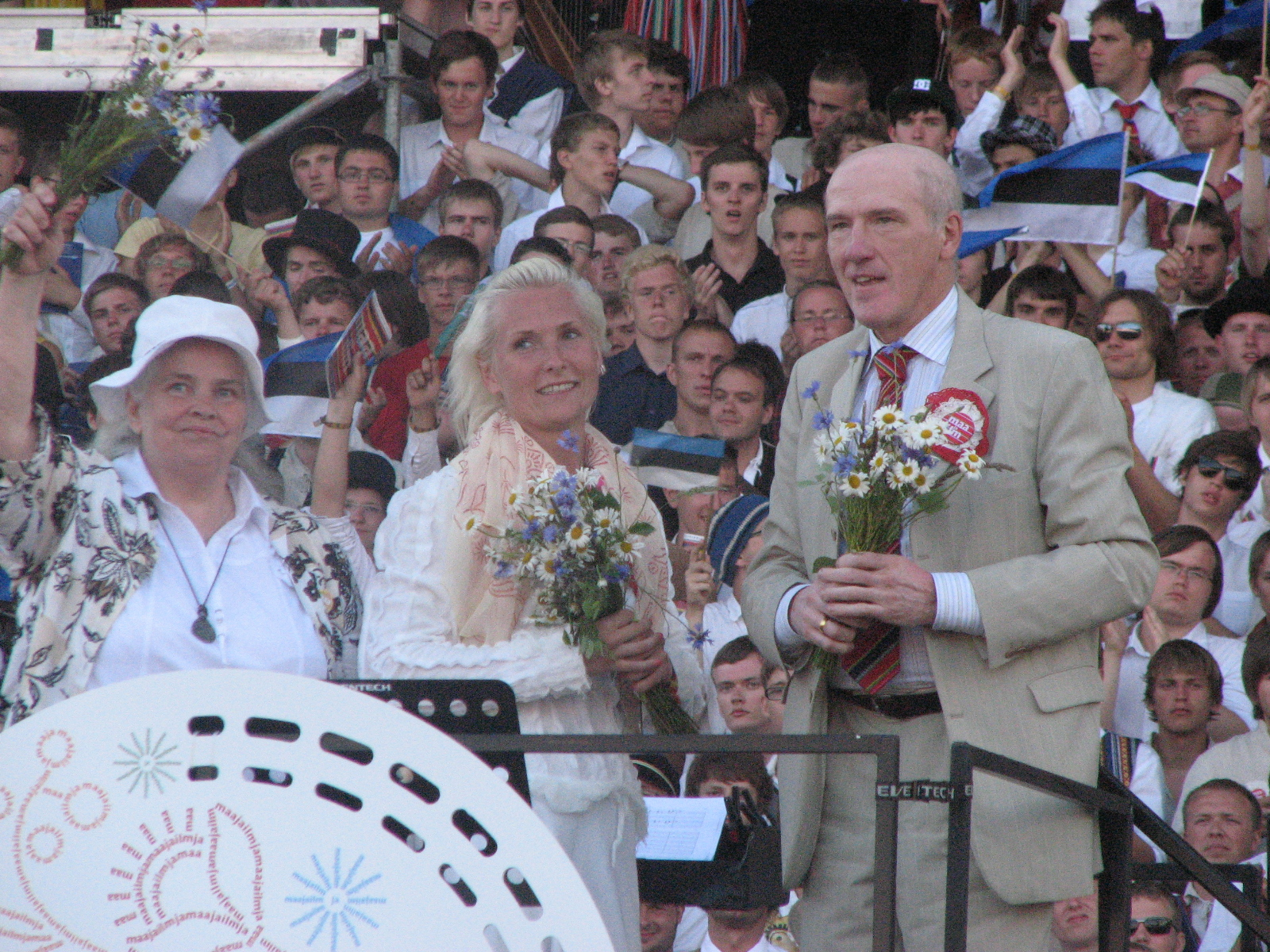
- Viiu Härm (left), Veronika Portsmuth and Olav Ehala at the XI Estonian Youth Song and Dance Festival in 2011
- Born: 3 July 1944 (age 81); Tallinn, then part of Generalbezirk Estland, Reichskommissariat Ostland
- Other name: Viiu Härm-Rummo
- Occupations: Actress, poet, author, photographer, translator
- Years active: 1962–present
- Spouse: Paul-Eerik Rummo
- Children: 3
- Relatives: Tiit Härm (brother)

Viiu Härm (born 3 July 1944) is an Estonian poet, author, photographer, translator, and former actress. Härm's career as an actress began as a teenager in the early 1960s. After appearing onstage and in several films, she retired from acting in the early 1970s to focus on writing.

== Early life and education ==
Viiu Härm was born in German occupied-Tallinn during World War II to parents Evald and Liidia Härm (née Kiive). She is the eldest of two children; her brother was ballet dancer/master and choreographer Tiit Härm (1946–2025). She attended Tallinn 29th Incomplete Secondary School from 1951 until 1958 and Tallinn 7th Secondary School from 1958 until graduating in 1962. Upon graduating from secondary school, she enrolled in the Performing Arts Department of the Tallinn State Conservatory (now, the Estonian Academy of Music and Theatre) to study acting under instruction of Voldemar Panso and Vello Rummo, graduating in 1966. Among her graduating classmates were Rudolf Allabert, Helgi Ilo, Enn Kraam, Tõnu Mikiver, and Tõnu Tamm.

== Career ==
=== Acting ===
Viiu Härm's career as an actress came to prominence as an eighteen-year-old when she was cast in the starring role of Salme in the 1962 Leida Laius-directed Tallinna Kinostuudio (now, Tallinnfilm) war-drama Õhtust hommikuni, based on the 1960 short story by author Heino Puhvel (under the pen name Mart Kalda). This was followed by a supporting role in the 1963 Igor Yeltsov-directed drama Ühe katuse all, based on the story Ühes majas by Estonian author Hans Leberecht and also released by Tallinna Kinostuudio. In 1967, she appeared in her final film role, that of Paula, in the Veljo Käsper-directed and Lilli Promet-penned Tallinnfilm drama Tütarlaps mustas. She has also appeared in several television productions.

When Härm's former Tallinn State Conservatory instructor and theatre pedagogue Voldemar Panso helped establish the Estonian SSR State Youth Theatre (now, the Tallinn City Theater) in 1965, Härm was among the first group of actors to receive an engagement with the theatre. She was employed at the theatre until 1971 when she retired for health reasons.

=== Writing ===
After retiring from acting before the age of thirty, Härm began to concentrate on writing. Her first works of poetry were published in the youth magazine Säde and the journal Noorus; her later works were consistently published in Estonia's oldest literary journal Looming. In 1973, Eesti Raamat published her first collection of poetry Pealkirjata. Since then, a number of collections of poetry and two novels have been published. Her 2004 novel Õhuaken won the 2005 Eduard Vilde Literary Award.

Selected works

- Pealkirjata (poetry collection, 1973)
- Luuletusi, lugusid ja midagi ka Margareetast (poetry collection, 1978)
- Valge vaikus (poetry collection with Peeter Tooming and Ants Säde, 1979)
- Sina, jõgi (poetry collection with photographer Peeter Tooming, 1984)
- Avamaastik / Kusagil tuksub mu süda (poetry collection with husband Paul-Eerik Rummo, 1989)
- Duubel kaks: nüüd, kus ma midagi ei küsi... (novel, 2000)
- Keegi teeline (poetry collection, 2004)
- Õhuaken (novel, 2004)
- Oh sind tüdrukut (children's book, 2009)
- Pallimäng (children's book, 2017)

In addition to her own work, Härm has also compiled a collection of poems by Marie Under titled Laternaks mu enda süda that was published in 2006 with a foreword written by Härm. She has also translated verses from Latvian into the Estonian language, and has also written new Estonian translations for the plays Among the Angels by Leonid Zhuhovitsky, The Cherry Orchard by Anton Chekhov, and Years of Wandering by Aleksei Arbuzov.

=== Photography ===
Härm has also earned recognition as a nature photographer. In 2017, she won awards from both the Pilvepiir photo contest and the natural science magazine Eesti Loodus. That same year, Härm's exhibit of nature photography titled Lähedal opened in both Kõpu Lighthouse on the island of Hiiumaa and at the A. H. Tammsaare Museum in Tallinn.

== Personal life ==
Viiu Härm is married to poet, playwright, translator, and politician Paul-Eerik Rummo. The couple have three daughters: Lilit, Tiiu-Liisa, and Viiu-Marie.
