= Ideaalmaastik =

1980 film directed by Peeter Simm

- Directed by: Peeter Simm
- Written by: Karl Helemäe
- Starring: Arvo Kukumägi; Tõnu Kark; Kalju Komissarov; Priit Adamson; Reet Paavel
- Cinematography: Arvo Iho
- Edited by: Toomas Raudam
- Music by: Erkki-Sven Tüür
- Production company: Tallinnfilm
- Release date: April 20, 1981
- Running time: 86 minutes
- Countries: Estonia; Soviet Union
- Language: Estonian

Ideaalmaastik (English: The Ideal Landscape) is a 1980 Estonian drama film directed by Peeter Simm, based on the story "Kevadkülvi volinik" by Karl Helemäe.

Awards:

- 1982: All-Union Film Festival, best director debut: Peeter Simm; best actor: Arvo Kukumägi
- 1983: San Remo Film Festival (Italy), 1983, jury special prize to Peeter Simm

== Cast ==
- Arvo Kukumägi - Deputy Mait Kukemeri
- Tõnu Kark - Chairman Harald Tuvike
- Kalju Komissarov - Secretary of district committee
- Priit Adamson - Asser
- Reet Paavel - Liina
- Aarne Üksküla - Liina's father
- Ines Aru - Liina's mother
- Paul Poom - Peeter Viksur
- Aire Johanson - Peeter Viksur's wife
- Urmas Kibuspuu - Vidrik Kits
- Viire Valdma - Reet Pärn
- Helle Kuningas - Asser's aunt
- Roland Selav - Old Kits
- Feliks Kark - Bearded man
