= Aire Koop =

Estonian actress

- Born: Aire Johanson; 30 May 1957 (age 69); Jõgeva, then part of Estonian SSR, Soviet Union
- Occupation: Actress
- Years active: 1978–present

Aire Koop (until 1987, Aire Johanson; born 30 May 1957) is an Estonian stage, film, and television actress whose career began in the late 1970s.

== Early life and education ==
Aire Koop was born Aire Johanson in Jõgeva. After graduating from Jõgeva Secondary School in 1975, she studied drama at the Pärnu Theatre training studio from 1977 until 1979. Koop later returned to school in 2004, graduating from the University of Tartu Viljandi Culture Academy in 2008 with a degree as a teacher and director of cultural and creative activities.

== Career ==
Koop began her career as a stage actress at the Endla Theatre in Pärnu in 1979, an engagement that lasted until 1994. Notable roles at the Endla Teatre have been in works by: Dagmar Normet, Juhan Smuul, William Shakespeare, Paul-Eerik Rummo, August Kitzberg, Agatha Christie, Stephen Poliakoff, Hugo Raudsepp, Franz von Pocci, Brian Friel, Jean Anouilh, Claude Magnier, and Tony Roper.

Koop (credited by her maiden name Johanson) made her film debut in a small role in the 1980 Peeter Simm directed feature film Ideaalmaastik for Tallinnfilm and based on the 1977 short-story Kevadkülvi volinik by Karl Helemäe. The following year, she had a more significant role as Miia in the Valentin Kuik directed television film Teaduse ohver. In 1983, she appeared in another television film, the crime-drama Suletud ring, directed by Peeter Urbla. The same year, she appeared in starring role as Tralla in Nipernaadi, a film adaptation of August Gailit's 1928 novel Toomas Nipernaadi, directed by Kaljo Kiisk.

In 1987, she appeared in two prominent roles in television films: as Käo Linda in the Eesti Televisioon (ETV) historical epic Tants aurukatla ümber, directed by Peeter Simm and written by Mats Traat, and as Knuters Minna in the Olav Neuland directed historical drama Näkimadalad; an adaptation of the Herman Sergo penned novel of the same name. Other feature film roles throughout the 1980s include the Lembit Ulfsak directed drama Keskea rõõmud in 1986, and in the Valentin Kuik directed youth film drama Perekonnapildid in 1989.

During the 1990s, Koop appeared in several more films: As Marta in the 1990 Arvo Iho directed Tallinnfilm drama Ainult hulludele ehk halastajaõde and as the character Silin's wife in the 1999 Peeter Simm directed drama Sellised kolm lugu: Aida for Lege Artis Film.

Since 1996, Koop has supervised the acting troupe of the Häädemeeste Hobby Theatre and from 2013 until 2014, the Pärnu Folk Theatre. She is also the CEO of the Pärnu County Folk Culture Centre Society, an organisation whose goals and activities are aimed at preserving and developing the regional identity of Pärnu County folk culture, and chairs the education and culture committee of the rural municipality council.

In 2009, Koop appeared as Mai in several episodes of the Kanal 2 comedy-crime television series Kelgukoerad. In 2017, Koop returned to film in two roles: as the apparition of the character Hans' mother in the Rainer Sarnet directed dark fantasy-drama November, and a small role as a member of a therapy group in the Andres Maimik and Katrin Maimik directed comedy film Minu näoga onu.
