= Äratus =

1989 film by Jüri Sillart

- Directed by: Jüri Sillart
- Written by: Rein Saluri
- Starring: Tõnu Kark; Sulev Luik; Kaljo Kiisk; Maria Klenskaja; Ülle Kaljuste; Väino Laes
- Cinematography: Mait Mäekivi
- Edited by: Tiina Lokk; Marju Juhkum
- Music by: Kuldar Sink
- Production company: Tallinnfilm
- Release date: 22 February 1990
- Running time: 103 minutes
- Countries: Estonia; Soviet Union
- Language: Estonian

Äratus (English: Awakening) is a 1989 Estonian historical drama film directed by Jüri Sillart.

== Plot ==
The film chronicles the lives of Estonian villagers during "Operation Priboi"; the 25 to 28 March 1949 Soviet mass deportation of more than 90,000 Estonians, Latvians and Lithuanians labeled as "enemies of the people" to forced settlements in inhospitable areas of the Soviet Union.

== Production ==
The manuscript of the film was written by writer and playwright Rein Saluri and presented to Tallinnfilm editor Tiina Lokk in late 1986 or early 1987. Lokk liked the manuscript, but was initially dissuaded by other employees at Tallinnfilm from pursuing the project. In 1989, the editorial board at Tallinnfilm granted Lokk permission to turn the manuscript into a film. Arvo Kruusement was the first choice to direct the film, however, he disliked the material. Jüri Sillart, who had worked as a cameraman and cinematographer up to that point in his career, showed an interest in the material and was hired as the director. Historian Mart Laar interviewed subjects who were deported to Siberia in the late 1940s for research and the manuscript was finalized on Hiiumaa by Saluri and Sillart.

The filmmakers later recounted that they were surprised that it was not difficult to make a film about the deportations during the end of the Soviet era. Russian conscripts were even hired from their military base at Tapa as extras in the film. When the film was completed, Lokk, Sillart, and Saluri took the film in a taxi to the All-Union Cinema Committee in Moscow for review. Neither Lokk nor Sillart remember any reproach by Soviet authorities there.

== Cast ==
- Tõnu Kark as Voldemar Rass
- Sulev Luik as I Linnamees
- Kaljo Kiisk as Mõistuse Jaan
- Maria Klenskaja as Linnanaine
- Jaan Rekkor as Peeter Kängsepp
- Anne Paluver as Salme Peterson
- Arvo Kukumägi as Kaarel Peterson
- Väino Laes as Saareaugu Arnold
- Ülle Kaljuste as Saareaugu Aliide
- Mati Klooren as Richard Sass
- Feliks Kark as Ants Tammemets
- Katrin Kohv as Vennaru Linda
- Rein Oja as II Vallamees
- Hilja Varem as Nuudimäe Armelde
- Elle Kull as Antsurahva Leida
- Kaie Mihkelson as I Naine
- Kaarin Raid as Maanaine
- Hannes Kaljujärv as Komsorg

== Accolades ==
Awards, nominations, participations:

- 1989: Monstra Internationale del Film d'Auttore (San Remo, Italy). Special Jury Prize
- 1990: Espoo Ciné International Film Festival (Finland). Nyrki Tapiovaara Award
- 1990: Riga International Film Festival (Latvia), Participation. Main Program
- 1990: Edinburgh International Film Festival (Scotland, UK). Participation, Main Program
- 2001: Baltic Film Festival (Gotland, Sweden). Participation, Main Program
