= Härm =

Härm is an Estonian surname. Notable people with the surname include:

- Tiit Härm (1946–2025), Estonian ballet dancer, ballet master and choreographer
- Viiu Härm (born 1944), Estonian poet, author, and former actress

== See also ==
- Mihkel Härms (1874–1941), Estonian ornithologist
- Miina Härma (1864–1941), Estonian composer
