= Tõnis =

Male given name

Tonis, Tõnis or Tönis is a masculine given name. Tõnis is an Estonian form of Anthony. Tönis is a Dutch and Swedish form of Tönnis and diminutive form of Antonius, Anton, Antoon, Anthonis, Anthoon, Antonie and Antonis. Tonis is a Dutch diminutive form of Antonius, Anton, Antoon, Anthonis, Anthoon, Antonie and Antonis. Tonis is a Lithuanian diminutive form of Antanas. Another variant of Tõnis in Estonian is Tõnu. It is also a surname. Persons bearing the name included:

== Given name ==
- Tõnis Erilaid (1943–2025), Estonian journalist
- Tõnis Kaasik (born 1949), Estonian entrepreneur, fencer, environmentalist, and politician
- Tõnis Kalbus (1880–1942), Estonian lawyer and politician
- Tõnis Kalde (born 1976), Estonian football player
- Tõnis Kasemets (born 1974), Estonian race car driver
- Tõnis Kask (1929–2016), Estonian director
- Tõnis Kimmel (born 1977), Estonian architect
- Tõnis Kint (1896–1991), Estonian politician
- Tõnis Kõiv (born 1970), Estonian politician
- Tõnis Lukas (born 1962), Estonian politician
- Tõnis Mägi (born 1948), Estonian musician
- Tõnis Mölder (born 1989), Estonian politician
- Tõnis Palts (born 1953), Estonian businessman and politician
- Tõnis Rätsep (born 1947), Estonian actor, musician, playwright, and educator
- Tõnis Rotberg (1882–1953), Estonian army general
- Tõnis Sahk (born 1983), Estonian long jumper
- Tõnis Seesmaa (born 1955), Estonian politician and engineer
- Tõnis Soop (1937–2016), Estonian painter and teacher
- Tõnis Tootsen (born 1988), Estonian writer
- Tõnis Vint (1942–2019), Estonian artist

== Surname ==
- Mike Tonis (born 1979), American baseball player
