= Arvo Kukumägi =

Estonian film and theatre actor

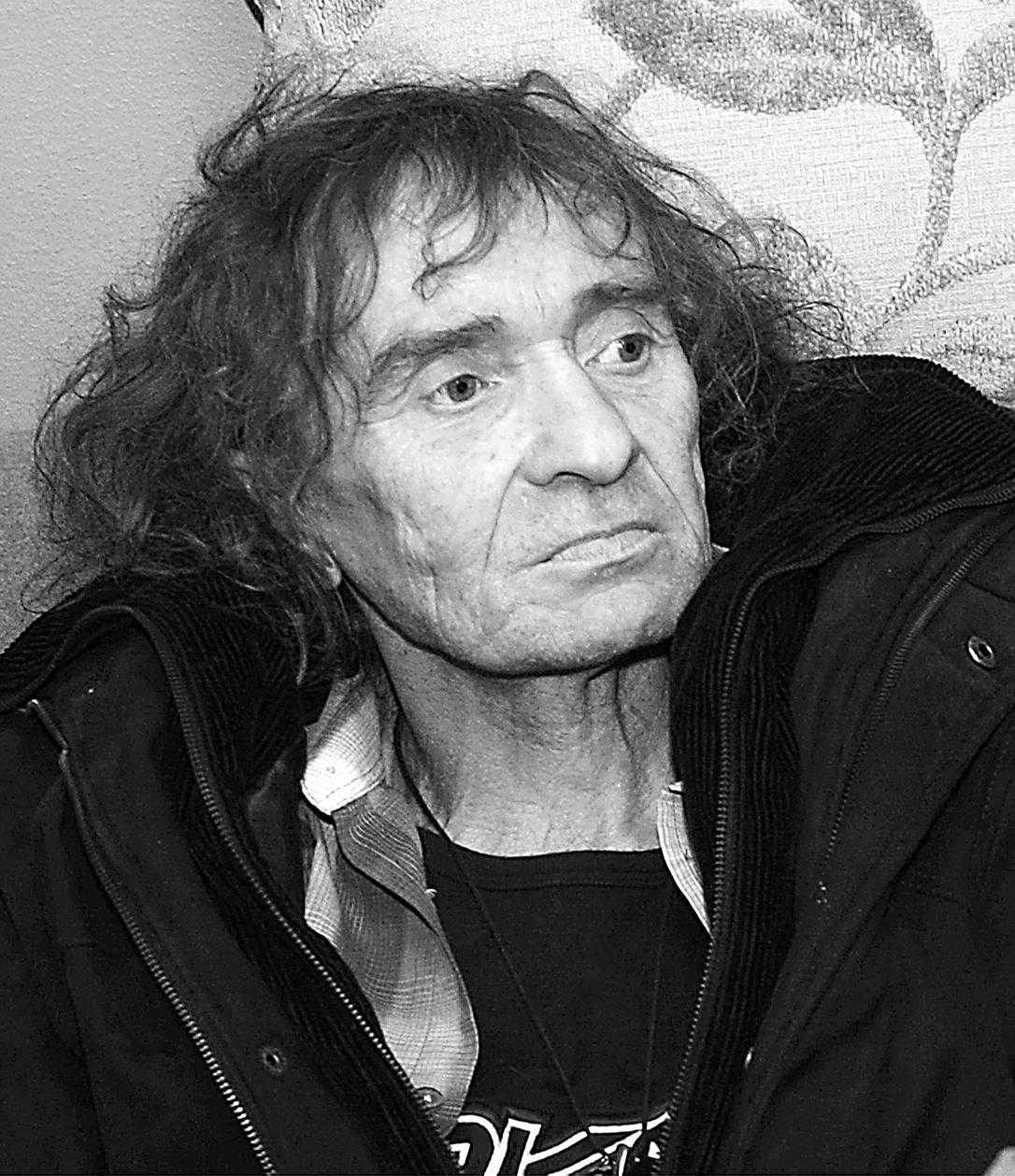
Arvo Kukumägi

Arvo Kukumägi (9 August 1958 in Litvina, Setomaa – 16 May 2017) was an Estonian film and theatre actor.

In 1980 he graduated from the Tallinn State Conservatory's Performing Arts Department. From 1980 to 1984 he was an actor at the Estonian SSR State Youth Theatre. He started working as a freelance actor in 1984.

In total, he acted or appeared in 50 films and 13 plays.

== Selected filmography ==
- Metskannikesed (1980)
- Tants aurukatla ümber (1987)
- Äratus (1989)
- Rahu tänav (1991)
- Firewater (1994)
- All My Lenins (1997)
- The Heart of the Bear (2001)
- Revolution of Pigs (2004)
- The Visit of the Old Lady (2006)
- Georg (2007)
- Graveyard Keeper's Daughter (2011)
- November (2017)
