= Meelis Kompus =

Estonian civil servant and media personality

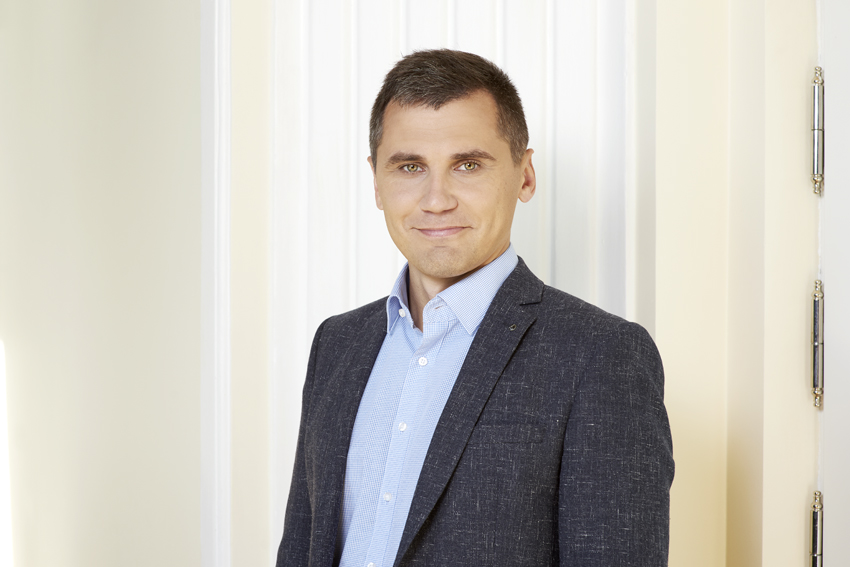
Meelis Kompus in 2016.

Meelis Kompus (born December 27, 1980, in Tallinn) is an Estonian civil servant and former Estonian TV and radio host, employed by the Estonian Public Broadcasting.

He has graduated from the Tallinn University in 2003 in radio production (B.A.) and continued in Tartu University, where he received the M.A. in cultural management in 2012.

At the age of 27, he became a news anchor of Aktuaalne kaamera, the evening news programme of Estonian Television, thus being among the youngest ever in that job. He resigned in 2013 to start working in government affairs.

Since 2014, Kompus is serving as the head of communications and spokesperson of the Ministry of Culture of Estonia. He was involved with the 2017 Estonian Youth Song and Dance Festival as a script writer.

Since 2025, he has been serving as the Communications Director of the publicly listed company AS Tallink Grupp.
