= Tõnisson =

Family name

Origin
- Language: Estonian
- Meaning: Son of Tõnis
- Region of origin: Estonia

Tõnisson is an Estonian patronymic surname meaning "son of Tõnis"; a compound of the Estonian masculine given name Tõnis and the Germanic suffix -son.

As of 1 January 2021, 344 men and 337 women have the surname Tõnisson in Estonia. In terms of the distribution of surnames, Tõnisson ranks the 124th most common surname for men in Estonia and 142nd for women in the country. The surname Tõnisson most commonly found in Viljandi County, where 15.45 per 10,000 inhabitants of the county bear the name.

Notabale people with the surname Tõnisson include:

- Tõnisson, a fictional character who appeared in Estonian writer Oskar Luts' short novels Kevade, Sügis, and Suvi and the film adaptations.
- Aleksander Tõnisson (1875–1941), Estonian military commander
- Ilmar Tõnisson (1911–1939), Estonian politician
- Jaan Tõnisson (1868–1941), Estonian statesman, former Prime Minister of Estonia
- Karl Tõnisson (1873/83–1962), Estonian writer and Buddhist
- Liina Tõnisson (born 1940), Estonian politician
- Mats Tõnisson (1853–1915), Estonian writer
