= Moscow Mission =

Moscow Mission may refer to:

- Moscow Mission (2006 film), a Russian action film
- Moscow Mission (2023 film), a Chinese crime action film
