= Nukitsamees =

1981 film directed by Helle Murdmaa

- Directed by: Helle Murdmaa
- Written by: Helle Murdmaa; Helgi Oidermaa; Olav Ehala
- Starring: Egert Soll; Anna-Liisa Kurve; Ülari Kirsipuu; Ita Ever; Tõnu Kark; Urmas Kibuspuu; Ines Aru; Aarne Üksküla
- Cinematography: Ago Ruus
- Edited by: Toomas Raudam
- Music by: Olav Ehala
- Production company: Tallinnfilm
- Release date: 16 March 1981
- Running time: 73 minutes
- Country: Estonia
- Language: Estonian

Nukitsamees (English: Bumpy) is a 1981 Estonian musical film directed by Helle Karis, based on the 1920 novel of the same name by Oskar Luts.

== Plot ==
Brother and sister Kusti and Iti are picking wild strawberries when they are abducted by Metsamoor, a forest witch. Metsamoor lives on a farm with Tölpa and Mõhk, two lazy creatures, and her son. Kusti is forced to perform slave labor around the farm, and Iti is locked in the hut to care for Metsamoor's mischievous son, whom Iti calls "Bumpy" ("Nukitsamees," or "the little horned one" in Estonian), due to the horn-like bumps on his head.

After some time in captivity, Kusti and Iti manage to escape, taking Bumpy with them back to their family. Though the parents and grandparents accept Bumpy, Kusti and Iti's five siblings reject him. Despite Father's insistence that they wait to see if Bumpy will grow into a normal adult, and Mother's repeated song number arguing against using a corporal punishment against the young boy, the siblings decide to wash Bumpy and rasp down his horns, to no avail as they immediately grow back.

Bumpy escapes the children's harassment only to be found by the family at the edge of the forest where Metsamoor resides. Unable to leave the forest from which she gets her powers, Metsamoor cannot take Bumpy back to her farm, much to the family's relief, who decide to adopt him for good. His horns magically disappear, and he whispers into Grandfather's ear the human name he chose for himself.

== Cast ==
- Egert Soll as Nukitsamees
- Anna-Liisa Kurve as Iti
- Ülari Kirsipuu as Kusti
- Ines Aru as Mother
- Aarne Üksküla as Father
- Sulev Nõmmik as Grandfather
- Ita Ever as Metsamoor
- Kaarel Kilvet as Metsavana
- Urmas Kibuspuu as Tölpa
- Tõnu Kark as Mõhk
- Mari Jüssi as Minni
- Tanel Kapper as Juku
- Ingrid Maasik as Mann
- Heiki Moorlat as Aadu
- Mihkel Raud as Tõnn

== Awards ==
Awards, nominations, participations:

- 1982: All-Union Film Festival (USSR), Grand Prix of children's jury and audience
- 1983: Soviet Estonian Film Festival, best cinematographer work: Ago Ruus
