= Jüri Järvet =

Estonian actor (1919–1995)

- Born: Georgi Kuznetsov; 18 June 1919; Tallinn, Estonia
- Died: 5 July 1995 (aged 76); Tallinn, Estonia
- Occupation: Actor

Jüri Järvet (Note: Estonian: Jüri Järvet; Russian: Юри Евгеньевич Ярвет, romanized: Yuri Yevgenyevich Yarvet) (18 June 1919 – 5 July 1995), born Georgi Kuznetsov, (Note: Russian: Георгий Евгеньевич Кузнецов, romanized: Georgy Yevgenyevich Kuznetsov; German: Georgi Kusnezow) was an Estonian actor.

== Biography ==
Jüri Järvet's birthname was Georgi Yevgenyevich Kuznetsov, and he took the Estonian form in 1938. Järvet's mother was a Russian, while his father is believed to have been an ethnic German who had immigrated from Lorraine.

Järvet is best known in the West for the role of Dr. Snaut in Andrei Tarkovsky's Solaris, but he played in numerous other films both in Russian and in his native Estonian. He was awarded the title of People's Artist of the USSR in 1975, and the USSR State Prize in 1981.

Järvet played the title role in King Lear (1971) filmed on bleak landscapes in his native Estonia by Russian director Grigori Kozintsev and released in 1970. Kozintsev shared the screenwriting credit with Boris Pasternak; the score was by Dmitri Shostakovich.

His son Jüri Järvet, Jr. has also acted in several movies, including All My Lenins and Khrustalyov, My Car!.

== Filmography ==
- The Happiness of Andrus (1955)
- The Uninvited Guests (1959) – Valter
- A Friend of Song (1961) – Ott Kuu
- Under One Roof (1963) – Tõnis
- Traces (1963) – Elmar
- Devil with a False Passport (1964) – Peetrus
- The Dairyman of Mäeküla (1965) – Tõnu Prillup
- The Baby Girl in Black (1967) – Juonas
- Postmark from Vienna (1968) – Martin Roll
- Dead Season (1968) – professor O'Reilly
- Madness (1969) – Windisch
- The Last Relic (1969) – Brother Johannes's voice (Estonian version)
- King Lear (1970) – King Lear
- The Windy Beach (1971) – Hollmann
- In the Stillness of the Wind (1971) – Saare Sander
- Echoes of the Past (1971) – Zeifert
- Metskapten (1971) – Jõnn
- Solaris (1972) – doctor
- Komitet 19-ti (1972) – teacher
- Ukuaru (1973) – Minna's father
- A Strange Story (1974) – psychiatrist
- Dangerous Games (1974) – Õline
- Crash (1974) – judge
- The Red Violin (1975 film (1975) – Peek
- Indrek (1976) – teacher of religion
- Summer (1976) – Toots's father
- A Time to Live and a Time to Love (1977) – minister
- The Cup game (1977) – Oskar (segment "Salakütt")
- Shores (1977, TV Series) – Count Seged
- Dead Mountaineer's Hotel (1979) – Alex Snewahr
- Wild Violets (1980) – Apothecary Lipp
- A Tale Told at Night (1981) – Waldmännchen
- The Adventurer (1983) – Siimon Vaa
- At the Lurich Arena (1984) – lawyer
- Face to Face (1987)
- Dances with a Bang (1987, TV film)
- Philip Traum (1989) – father Peter
- Dance of Death (1991) – mayor of Tallinn
- Peace Street (1991) – Jaak
- The Time of Your Life (1992)
- He will Get His (1992) – Demoney
- Luukas (1992) – Albert
- Lza ksiecia ciemnosci (1993) – composer
- Marraskuun harmaa valo (1993) – Vanha Mies
- Darkness in Tallinn (1993) – Anton
