= Peace Street (film) =

1991 film directed by Roman Baskin

- Estonian: Rahu tänav
- Directed by: Roman Baskin
- Written by: Toomas Kall
- Produced by: Ants Tomband
- Starring: Mikk Mikiver; Katrin Karisma; Lauri Vihman; Kaljo Kiisk; Kersti Kreismann; Sulev Luik; Jüri Järvet
- Cinematography: Ago Ruus
- Edited by: Kaie-Ene Rääk
- Music by: Erkki-Sven Tüür
- Production company: Tallinnfilm
- Release date: 12 December 1991
- Running time: 98 minutes
- Country: Estonia
- Language: Estonian

Peace Street (Estonian: Rahu tänav) is a 1991 Estonian film directed by Roman Baskin.

Awards:

- 1992: FilmFestival Cottbus (Germany), 1992, main prize - best film
- 1992: European Film Awards, nomination: European Supporting Actor of the Year 1992: Väino Laes for Rahu tänav
- 1993: Brussels International Independent Film Festival, participating

== Plot ==
Somewhere in a European country in its 1930-ies, 1940-ies, in a small town and its Peace Street, which suddenly becomes occupied by an unknown army on Christmas Eve: looking out of their windows, the street's inhabitants are faced with soldiers standing in front of their houses, keeping guard there. Additionally, a new official moves in as a new tenant into one of the houses. And while nothing worth noticing happens at first, after some weeks all inhabitants of Peace Street willing to enter their homes have to show their IDs before. In order to maintain peace, they better should cooperate, they are told by the authorities. While some few rebel (and shortly after vanish), the mayority obeys the instructions. The more that they are told by the commander, the soldiers will leave as soon as the snow melts, and normality will return soon... But meanwhile it's June, and the lake near the town is still covered with ice, on which the military and remaining inhabitants of Peace Street celebrate their annual midsummer party.

== Cast ==
- Mikk Mikiver as Verner
- Jüri Järvet as Jaak
- Katrin Karisma as Agnes
- Maria Avdjuško as Lilka
- Lauri Vihman as Lauri
- Arvo Kukumägi as Uugu
- Kaljo Kiisk as Eugen
- Väino Laes as Peeter
- Kersti Kreismann as Inga
- Helene Vannari as Selma
- Elisabet Reinsalu as Rita
- Tõnu Kilgas as Kuno
- Mihkel Pulk as Tiit
- Laine Mägi as Lagle
- Sulev Luik as Tiidus
- Maimu Vannas as Loreida
- Härmo Saarm as Officer
