= Curse of Snakes Valley =

- Original Russian film poster
- Directed by: Marek Piestrak
- Written by: Marek Piestrak; Vladimir Valutsky; Wojciech Niżyński
- Based on: The Hobby of Dr. Traven by Robert Stratton
- Starring: Krzysztof Kolberger; Roman Wilhelmi; Ewa Sałacka; Leon Niemczyk
- Cinematography: Ryszard Lenczewski; Janusz Pawłowski
- Edited by: Maria Kuźmińska-Lebiedzik
- Music by: Sven Grünberg
- Production companies: Tallinnfilm; Zespól Filmowy "Oko"
- Distributed by: Sagres Filmes
- Release dates: 3 October 1988 (Poland); 5 March 1988 (Estonia)
- Running time: 99 minutes
- Countries: Poland; Soviet Union
- Languages: Polish; Russian
- Budget: 100 million PLN

Curse of Snakes Valley (Polish: Klątwa doliny węży, Estonian: Madude oru needus) is a 1988 Polish–Soviet Estonian adventure science fiction horror film directed by Marek Piestrak. The screenplay is loosely based on the Robert Stratton short story "The Hobby of Dr. Traven", which was published by the end of 1970s in the Polish magazine Przekrój.

The trio of adventurous pals, a man who is a scientist, a fine lady and a former military pilot are in the Indochina jungles, looking for some mysterious vase that holds a metal container that is of no mundane origin.

Curse of Snakes Valley was a great box office success. About 1 million viewers saw the film in Poland and as many as 25 million in the Soviet Union.

In 2022, New Orleans hip hop duo $uicideboy$ used clips of the film for the lyric video of their song "$uicideboy$ Were Better In 2015", off of their album Sing Me A Lullaby, My Sweet Temptation.

== Plot ==
In 1954, during the First Indochina War, a helicopter is shot by partisans. It lands on the edge of the jungle. Military pilot Bernard Traven goes to a Buddhist temple while looking for water, from where he steals a precious casket. The monk curses him for this act.

30 years later in Paris, Polish scientist Jan Tarnas arrives for a lecture. He is a specialist in old Thai manuscripts. The military asks the professor to decipher the manuscript from the found box. When cutting the stolen item, the light goes out in the laboratory and snakes appear. Police arrives on site. Tarnas also meets Christine Jaubert, journalist of France-Soir.

Traven and Tarnas explain the manuscript card. They pay attention to the warning of "Khuman" – a mysterious danger in the Valley of a Thousand Snakes. They both decide to travel to this place together. At the headquarters of an indefinite organization, Martin Breecher studies information about Tarnas and Traven. He learns that, according to a computer analysis, the casket consists of an Yttrium and a Lutetium alloy, which can be obtained in conditions of space. Breecher draws attention to the term "terrible weapon." The organization forces a photo of the Christine article about snakes in the center of Paris.

Traven and Tarnas arrive in Vietnam. They receive a guide from the Ministry of Culture and Art. Since the only working car was previously borrowed by Christine, the pilot and the professor decide to go on an expedition together with the journalist. Noiret, a representative of the organization, learns that Christine informed the editors about the expedition to the Lerng Nochta monastery. During the journey, the expedition encounters a Soviet engineer Buturlin who is an acquaintance of Tarnas.

Upon reaching the monastery, the expedition promises the monks to return the manuscripts after leading them to the Valley of Might and Power. During the expedition, they find the remains of Traven's helicopter. Near the Valley of Snakes, the monk suddenly disappears. Among the ruins, the team discovers a descent to a chamber where many snakes live. Traven saves Christine and Tarnas. The three proceed to a great hall with statues resembling astronauts. They find a passage through a corridor guarded by a sculpture of dragons firing laser beams. Another threat is a giant white snake that dies as a result of Tarnas' ruse. The team enters the chamber, where they find the grave of the extraterrestrial visitor and an amphora, which, when moved, opens the water supply. At the last moment, the professor finds a hidden entrance. Traven betrays Christine and Tarnas, leaving them in the chamber. The journalist and the professor are saved by an injured guide. The monk warns Tarnas and Christine about the consequences of stealing the amphora.

Thanks to Buturlin's help, Tarnas and Christine return to the hotel just as Traven is killed and takes the amphora. A monk kills a thief sent by the organization, and Christine, following the trail, switches bags. After landing in Paris, the attackers kidnap the professor and the amphora bag. Tarnas ends up in the organization's palace, where he watches Breecher open a mysterious container. Breecher transforms when trying to open it. Christine finds the professor looming in the garret. Tarnas and Christine observe Buddhist monks in the center of Paris. The organization's director accepts Noiret's report of the lab's events. During the analysis, concentrated poisons and an unknown genetic code were found in the liquid. Director ordering Noiret to transport the amphora to Mataiva. Pink smoke comes out of the amphora and the plane carrying it disappears.

== Cast ==
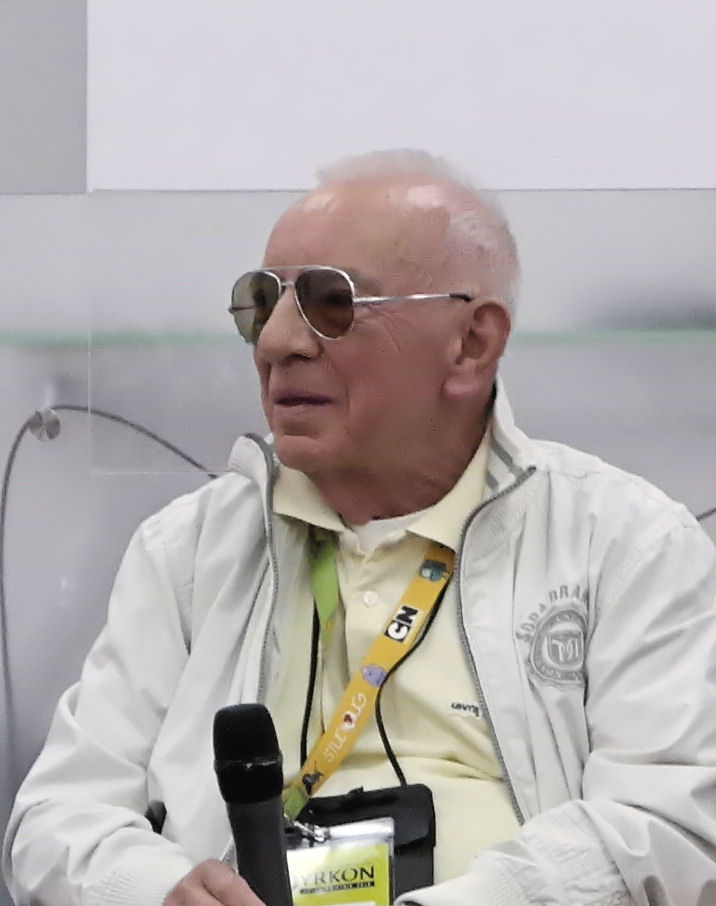
Marek Piestrak, director Curse of Snakes Valley

- Krzysztof Kolberger as professor Jan Tarnas
- Roman Wilhelmi as Captain Bernard Traven
- Ewa Sałacka as Christine Jaubert
- Zbigniew Lesień as Noiret
- Leon Niemczyk as Man with black glasses
- Igor Przegrodzki as Breecher
- Zygmunt Bielawski as Morineau
- Henryk Bista as Reporter
- Sergey Desnitsky as Andrey Buturlin
- Mikk Mikiver as Director of organization (dubbed by Bogusław Sochnacki)
- Tõnu Saar as Saar

== Production ==
The film's principal photography was done primarily in Vietnam (Initially, it was planned to shoot in Laos). Shots for the film were made at: Ho Chi Minh City Airport, Hanoi, Mỹ Sơn Temple and in Quang Nam Province. Some of the scenes for the film were shot in Paris (Eiffel Tower, Sorbonne square) and Tallinn.

The film's budget is estimated to 100 million PLN.
