= All My Lenins =

1997 film by Hardi Volmer

- Directed by: Hardi Volmer
- Written by: Toomas Kall
- Produced by: Mati Sepping
- Cinematography: Arko Okk
- Edited by: Marju Juhkum
- Music by: Thomas DeRenzo
- Release date: 2 October 1997
- Running time: 99 minutes
- Countries: Estonia; Russia
- Languages: Estonian; Russian; German; English

All My Lenins (Estonian: Minu Leninid; Russian: Все мои Ленины) is a 1997 historical comedy film by Hardi Volmer. It was produced by the Faama Film company in cooperation with Lenfilm.

== Synopsis ==
In 1908, young Estonian politician Aleksander Kesküla (Üllar Saaremäe) escaped from the Esthonia (Estland) Governorate, then part of the Russian Empire, to Switzerland, where he enrolled in the University of Bern. Kesküla is concerned about national oppression in tsarist Russia, as is famous Russian Bolshevik and exiled intellectual, Vladimir Lenin (portrayed by Viktor Sukhorukov). Lenin believes tsarist Russia to be "the prison of nations".

When World War I breaks out, Lenin blames it on the Russian and German bourgeoisie. He begins to agitate "to end war even if Russia is defeated". Kesküla seizes the opportunity to use Lenin and his followers to start a revolution against the Russian Empire. He devises a plan to overthrow Russia and build upon the ruins of the defunct state of Gross-Estland (Great Estonia). The new empire would incorporate all former Finno-Ugric territories, including Saint Petersburg.

Kesküla and the German Ministry of Foreign Affairs make a deal to support Lenin financially. Lenin accepts the help. The Germans then install their super-spy Müller (Andrus Vaarik) to serve as the project's coordinator. Kesküla and Müller train five Russian men as Lenin's doppelgängers; they want to be sure they can replace the real Lenin at any moment should something happen to him or should Lenin become a liability.

== Historical accuracy ==
The authors of the film (screenplay by Toomas Kall, story by Hardi Volmer and Ott Sandrak) called it "pseudo-historical", as the film contains some historical accuracies, but is mostly fictional. In fall 1914, the German ambassador in Switzerland, Freiherr Gisbert von Romberg (Linnar Priimägi), informed his government about "an Estonian, Alexander Kesküla, who made a proposal to use Lenin in our plans against Russia". German intelligence clarified that Kesküla indeed had access to Bolshevik inner circles and to Lenin himself (as in the film). Moreover, Kesküla had prior experience using foreign assistance to support rebels in Russia; in 1905, he received money from Japanese spy Akashi Motojiro to advance his interests in Tallinn, Tartu, and Riga.

The Germans were initially skeptical of Kesküla's proposal. The German Foreign Ministry viewed the Bolsheviks as a fringe political group that lacked the influence to change hearts and minds in the Russian state (as in the film). However, the situation soon changed; in December 1914, Kesküla received 10,000 Reichsmarks from the German Empire to distribute to the Bolsheviks.

Although Kesküla informed the German government about Lenin, Kesküla may not have been the only one to fund Lenin's cause with outside money. The film, however, focuses solely on Kesküla. "The school of Lenin's doppelgängers in Zürich" is also fictional, as are the doppelgängers themselves (Lenin-Monk, Lenin-Beggar, Lenin-Electrician, and Lenin-Criminal).

== Cast ==
- Üllar Saaremäe as Aleksander Kesküla
- Viktor Sukhorukov as V. I. Lenin / Vanya
- Andrus Vaarik as Alfred Müller
- Indrek Taalmaa as Oskar Elevant
- Helene Vannari as Nadezhda Krupskaya
- Janne Sevtsenko as Inessa Armand
- Peeter Volkonski as Grigory Zinoviev
- Peeter Laurits as Lenin III (Beggar)
- Lauri Nebel as Lenin IV (Hardened Criminal)
- Jüri Järvet Jr. as Lenin V (Electrician)
- Eero Spriit as Lenin VI (Monk)
- Elektra as Katherine
- Epp Eespäev as Katherine's mother
- Jaan Rekkor as Katherine's father
- Omar Volmer as Wallace, American industrialist
- Linnar Priimägi as Bernis Romberg, German ambassador
- Peeter Kard as Bernis Bismarck, German military attaché
- Peeter Jakobi as Jagow, Secretary of State of German Ministry of Foreign Affairs
- Sulev Luik, Zimmermann, Secretary of State Jagow's deputy
- Gunnar Kilgas as Officer of German military mission
- Hannes Võrno as Officer of German military mission
- Raivo Rüütel as Officer of German military mission
- Egon Nuter as Officer of German military mission
- Aarne Üksküla as Hollweg, German State Chancellor
- Ferdinand Kala as Professor Ostenstern
- Arvo Kukumägi as Head of German War Prisoner's camp
- Peeter Kaljumäe as Romberg's secretary
- Tõnu Aav as German general
- Hardi Volmer as General's adjutant
- Eduard Toman as J. V. Stalin / Frontier Officer
- Sergei Tserkassov as Radek
- Rein Oja as Bolshevik / NKVD Agent
- Jüri Krjukov as Bolshevik
- Erik Ruus as Bolshevik
- Roman Baskin as Bolshevik
- Anne Paluver as Bolshevik
- Dajan Ahmet as Cossack Konev
- Kalju Komissarov as Head of Russian gendarmerie

== See also ==
- Cinema of Estonia
- History of Russia (1894–1917)
  - Bolshevism
  - October Revolution
  - Russian Revolution of 1905
- Estonia–Germany relations
- Estonia–Russia relations
