= Nest of Winds =

1979 film directed by Olav Neuland

- Estonian: Tuulte pesa
- Directed by: Olav Neuland
- Written by: Mats Traat; Grigori Kanovičius; Isaakas Fridbergas
- Starring: Rudolf Allabert; Nelli Taar; Arvo Iho; Anne Maasik; Indrek Korb; Evald Aavik; Tõnu Kark; Vaino Vahing; Ain Lutsepp
- Cinematography: Arvo Iho
- Edited by: Enn Rekkor; Ilmar Taska
- Music by: Lepo Sumera
- Production company: Tallinnfilm
- Release date: 17 September 1979
- Running time: 95 minutes
- Countries: Estonia; Soviet Union
- Language: Estonian

Nest of Winds (Estonian: Tuulte pesa) is a 1979 Estonian drama film directed by Olav Neuland.

Awards:

- 1980: All-Union Film Festival (USSR), best director debut: Olav Neuland
- 1980: Karlovy Vary International Film Festival (Czech), First award to "Tuulte pesa" (debut prize)

== Cast ==
- Rudolf Allabert - Jüri Piir, host of Mahtjamäe farm
- Nelli Taar - Roosi Piir, his spouse
- Arvo Iho - Juhan Piir, their son
- Anne Maasik - Liisa Piir, Juhan's wife
- Indrek Korb - Margus Piir, son of Liisa Piir
- Evald Aavik - Foreigner
- Tõnu Kark - Tiit Paljasmaa
- Vaino Vahing - Forest Brother
- Ain Lutsepp - Forest Brother
