= Villu Kangur =

Estonian actor, poet, translator, and scenarist

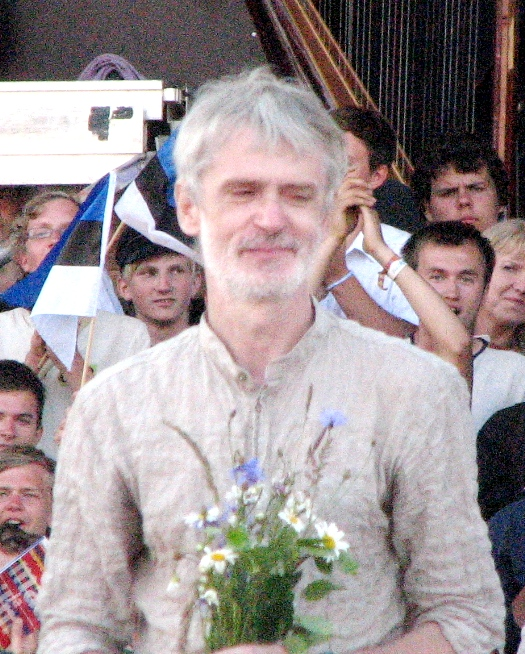
Villu Kangur at the XI Estonian Youth Song and Dance Festival, 2011

Villu Kangur (born 27 November 1957) is an Estonian actor, poet, translator and scenarist.

Kangur was born in Pärnu. In 1982–1992 he worked at Estonian State Youth Theatre. In 1993–2002 he was an editor at the newspaper Eesti Ekspress.

He has written song texts, libretos and screenwritings for musicals, operas and films.

In 2018 he was awarded with Order of the White Star, V class.

== Filmography ==
- 1993 "Salmonid" (television series; scenarist)
- 2005 "Hajameelselt abielus" (television series; scenarist)
- 2010, 2019 "ENSV" (television series; scenarist; role: doctor)
- 2014 "A ja B" (television series; scenarist)
- 2015 "Mustad lesed" (television series; role Estonian: antiigikaupmees)
- 2018 "Põrgu Jaan" (feature film; role: Jakub)
