= Toomas Kall =

Estonian humorist, caricaturist, writer, scenarist and translator

Toomas Kall (pseudonym Uku-Ralf Tobi; born on 16 October 1947 in Tallinn) is an Estonian humorist, caricaturist, writer, scenarist and translator.

== Career ==
1966-1969 he studied history, and 1970-1972 Estonian philology at Tartu State University. From 1971 until 1978, he worked at the newspaper Sirp ja Vasar. From 1980 until 1987, he worked at Vanalinnastuudio. From 1990 until 1994, he was the chief editor of the newspaper Sirp. Since 1994 he is a freelancer. He has also worked as a film and television screenwriter.

In 1980, Kall was a signatory of the Letter of 40 intellectuals; a public letter in which 40 intellectuals attempted to defend the Estonian language and expressed their protest against the recklessness of the Republic-level government in dealing with youth protests that were sparked a week earlier due to the banning of a public performance of the band Propeller. The real reasons were much more deep-seated, and had to do primarily with the Russification policies of the Kremlin in occupied Estonia.

Since 1984, Kall has been a member of the Estonian Writers Union.

== Awards ==
- 2006: Order of the National Coat of Arms, IV class.

== Works ==
=== Screenwritings ===
- 1973: Värvipliiatsid, Tallinnfilm, animated film
- 1983: Sõlm, Tallinnfilm, puppetry film
- 1986: Kevadine kärbes, Tallinnfilm, puppetry film
- 1987: Magus planeet, Tallinnfilm, puppetry film
- 1991: Ärasõit, Tallinnfilm, animated film
- 1991: Hobuse aasta, Tallinnfilm, feature film
- 1991: Rahu tänav, Tallinnfilm, feature film
- 1995–1998: M Klubi, BEC, television series
- 1997: Minu Leninid, Faama Film, feature film
- 2001–2011: Pehmed ja karvased, BEC, television series
- 2002: Eesti valik 2001, Raamatfilm, documentary film
- 2005: Mees animatsoonist, Acuba Film, documentary film
