= Tulivesi =

1994 film by Hardi Volmer

The Firewater Estonian: Tulivesi
- Directed by: Hardi Volmer
- Written by: Ott Sandrak; Hardi Volmer
- Produced by: Mati Sepping
- Cinematography: Arko Okk
- Edited by: Marju Juhkum
- Music by: Olav Ehala
- Release date: 14 April 1994
- Country: Estonia

Tulivesi "Firewater," is Hardi Volmer's history-based thriller released in 1994.

The movie is based on the historical situation in Estonia at the end of 1920s and portrays a pivotal example of the struggle between the Estonian government and alcohol smugglers. This film is dedicated to those who carry out the difficult and hopeless struggle against the narcotic business.

== Plot ==
At the end of the 1920s, Finland enacted a prohibition law that lasted for 12 years. Estonian bootleggers living across the Gulf of Finland profited heavily from this dry law, and this severely disrupted the Finnish economy.

In the fictional Estonian fishing village of Ropsi, a principled new border guard chief, Lieutenant Aleksander Kattai, arrives determined to enforce law and order. At the same time, the village's most notorious alcohol smuggler, Eerik Ekström, is crossing the gulf in a boat loaded with jerry cans full of liquor. He tows more cans behind him, welded into a unit known to smugglers as a "liquor torpedo." Around this time, Lieutenant Kattai meets Ekström's fiancée, Hilda Sibul. The two quickly fall in love, but their romance is short-lived.

From this point on, the film shifts into a thrilling game of cat-and-mouse filled with unexpected plot twists. Lieutenant Kattai discovers that high-ranking government officials are deeply involved in the Ropsi smuggling ring. Estonaian minister Tui and a senior navy officer, "Papa" Nymann, are both profiting from the contraband. Wanting to drive up liquor prices to reap greater profits, Minister Tui hypocritically campaigns for the Estonian parliament to pass its own prohibition laws, weaponizing the rhetoric of the local temperance movement to manipulate the public.

Lieutenant Kattai's dedication to the law stems from a rigorous military background, which he reveals during the film: "I am Lieutenant Kattai, a former soldier of Armored Train Unit Number Two. After the war, I stayed with the border guard. I was stationed at the southern border near Pskov up until now. There was gunfire every day; Russian merchants and smugglers, Red agents..." These details directly tie his character history to the veteran experiences of the Estonian War of Independence.

== Background ==
Estonia’s first period of independence (1918–1940) has long been deeply revered by its citizens, who often look back on those twenty-one years as a "golden age." In many ways, Tulivesi treats this era with a tender, almost postcard-like nostalgia. However, a deeper, more sobering question echoes through the narrative: "Is this the same Estonia we fought for?" This emotional resonance led contemporary film critics to praise the movie as one of the finest Estonian thrillers ever made.

The movie premiered in the fall of 1994 and went on to win the inaugural Film of the Year award from the Estonian Association of Film Journalists. The movie features an original score by celebrated composer Olav Ehala, with cinematography captured by Arko Okk. The screenplay was co-written by Ott Sandrak and the film's director, Hardi Volmer.

== Cast ==
- Epp Eespäev as Hilda
- Erik Ruus as Eerik
- Jaan Tätte as Aleks
- Ain Lutsepp as Nymann
- Lembit Ulfsak as Tui
- Tõnu Kark as Julius
- Raivo Mets as Mart
- Eduard Toman as Einari
- Marko Matvere as Pilli-Villu
- Eve Kivi as Lulu
- Arvo Kukumägi as Türgi Joss
- Janika Piibemaa as Tui's secretary
- Enn Kraam as Eerik's father
