= Marek Piestrak =

Polish film director (*1938)

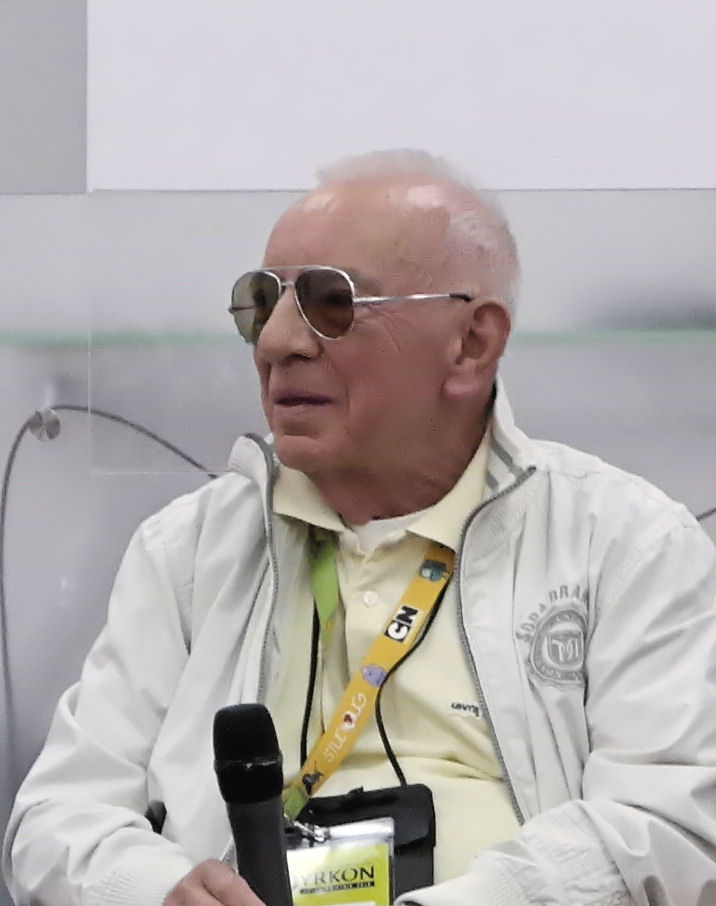
Marek Piestrak, 2015

Marek Piestrak (born March 31, 1938) is Polish film director and screenwriter.

== Filmography ==
- 1974: Śledztwo Polish TV film based on Stanislaw Lem's novel The Investigation
  Lem was unhappy with the work, but he wrote he was aware of the extremely low budget and appreciated the director's dedication, who sometimes used dirty tricks to make shots (e.g., he pretended to be a crazy man and burst into Scotland Yard with a camera to make some valuable shots for free) .
- 1979: Inquest of Pilot Pirx
  "Golden Asteroid" Big Prize at the International Cinema Festival at Trieste 1979.
- 1983: She-Wolf, psychological drama with elements of horror, set in 1848
- 1988: Curse of Snakes Valley
  Despite the box office success, film critics considered it a failure and gave name to the Snake Award for Polish cinematographic failures, similar to the American Golden Raspberry Awards.
- 1990: The Return of She-Wolf, sequel to She-Wolf
- 1993: The Tear of the Prince of Darkness (Satan's Tear) Saatana pisar (in Estonian), Łza księcia ciemności (in Polish), Слеза князя тьмы (in Russian)
  Horror / crime fiction. Actions are in Tallinn, 1939. A German baron and a sect of Satanists are looking for a legendary ring hidden by the 18th-century Satanists, with which they want to bring Satan to Earth.
