= Jüri Sillart =

Estonian film operator, director and producer

Jüri Sillart (29 May 1943 Tallinn – 10 September 2011) was an Estonian film operator, director, producer and pedagogue.

In 1970 he graduated from Gerasimov Institute of Cinematography. From 1971 to 1994 he worked as an operator-director in Tallinnfilm. Since 1993 he is a producer and director in studio OÜ Kairiin (which he established itself). He worked at Tallinn University, who described him as producing "very unusual and interesting artistic visuals in the 1970's and 1980's". After his death, which was said to be "sudden", a memorial service was held for him in the ceremony hall of Baltic Film and Media School.

He worked with many well-known directors of his time, including Grigori Kromanov, Kaljo Kiisk, Leida Laius, and Arvo Kruusement.

Awards:

- 2001: Order of the White Star, V class.

== Filmography ==
- 1980: Metskannikesed (cinematographer)
- 1989: Äratus (director)
- 1998: Raplamaa (Documentary film) (producer, director, screenwriter)
- 1999: Gotland-saaremaa. Sõsarsaared (Documentary film) (Producer)
- 2000: Volli, sempre volli (Documentary film)
- 2001: Peeter (Documentary film) (producer, director, screenwriter. cinematographer)
- 2002: Leida lugu (documental film) (producer, director, screenwriter)
- 2006: Kuldrannake (feature film) (director)
- 2011: Monumentum kikilipsuga (documentary film) (director, screenwriter)
