= Tonu =

Tonu may refer to:

- Tonu, a rhinoceros-like species of Neopet
- Tonu Laijinglembi, a heroine in the epic cycles of incarnations of Meitei mythology
- Tonu, Papua New Guinea
- Tõnu, an Estonian masculine given name
