= Tõnu Saar =

Estonian actor (1944–2022)

- Born: 6 August 1944
- Died: 12 July 2022 (aged 77)
- Education: Tallinn State Conservatory
- Occupations: actor, photographer
- Years active: 1972–1998
- Known for: Estonian Youth Theatre, Estonian Drama Theatre

Tõnu Saar (6 August 1944 – 12 July 2022) was an Estonian actor.

In 1972, he graduated from the Tallinn State Conservatory's Performing Arts Department. From 1963 until 1968, he worked as a photographer. From 1972 until 1980, he worked at Estonian Youth Theatre, and from 1980 until 1998, at the Estonian Drama Theatre. Besides theatre roles he appeared in a number of films and on television.

== Filmography ==
- 1971: Don Juan Tallinnas
- 1977: Surma hinda küsi surnutelt
- 1978: Inquest of Pilot Pirx
- 1980: Metskannikesed
- 1981: Young Russia
- 1987: Madude oru needus
- 1994: Ameerika mäed
- 1994: Tulivesi
