= Hullumeelsus =

1969 film directed by Kaljo Kiisk

- Directed by: Kaljo Kiisk
- Written by: Viktors Lorencs
- Starring: Jüri Järvet; Vaclovas Blēdis; Valeri Nosik; Bronius Babkauskas; Voldemar Panso; Mare Garšnek; Viktor Pljut
- Cinematography: Anatoli Zabolotski; Andrei Dobrovolski
- Edited by: Eugen Rozental
- Music by: Lembit Veevo
- Production company: Tallinnfilm
- Distributed by: Tallinnfilm
- Release date: February 1969
- Running time: 79 minutes
- Countries: Estonia; Soviet Union
- Languages: Estonian; German

Hullumeelsus (English: Madness) is a 1969 Estonian mystery drama film directed by Kaljo Kiisk.

Awards, nominations, participations:

- 1969: Baltic Soviet Republics and Belarusian Film Festival (USSR), best male actor: Jüri Järvet
- 1984: San Remo Film Festival (Italy), participation

== Cast ==
- Jüri Järvet - Windisch
- Vaclovas Blėdis - human nr 1
- Valeri Nosik - editor
- Bronius Babkausas - Willy
- Viktor Plyut - Krohn
- Hugo Havel - Olly
- Mare Garsnek - Sophie
- Lembit Anton - Naerja
