= Erika Kaljusaar =

Estonian actress, theatre producer, and stage manager

- Born: 23 March 1956 (age 70); Tallinn, then part of Estonian SSR, Soviet Union
- Occupations: Actress, theatre producer, stage manager
- Years active: 1979–present
- Partner: Väino Laes (1980–present)

Erika Kaljusaar (born 23 March 1956) is an Estonian stage, film, and television actress, theatre producer, and stage manager whose career began on stage in 1979. She is a founder of the Open Stage Association of Freelance Actors, and a founding member and leader of the Loomine traditional theatre since 2004. Kaljusaar has also worked as a project manager for the Padise Abbey museum since 2007, and since 2013, as a contributor to the newspaper Padise Teataja.

== Early life and education ==
Kaljusaar was born in Tallinn. Her parents were laborers. During her youth, she lived in Keila and graduated from Keila I secondary school in 1974. Afterward, she studied drama at the Vanemuine training studio in Tartu.

== Career ==
=== Theatre ===
In 1979, Kaljusaar began a five-year engagement as an actress at the Rakvere Theatre in Rakvere. In 1986, she joined the Vanemuine theatre in Tartu, leaving in 1988. Notable stage roles been in works by such playwrights and authors as: Jüri Tuulik, Albert Uustulnd, Kalju Saaber, Mait Metsanurk, Jaan Kross, Stanislav Stratiev, Carlo Goldoni, A. H. Tammsaare, Georges Feydeau, Jaan Kruusvall, Oldřich Daněk, and Henrik Ibsen. In 1997, she was a founder of the Open Stage Association of Freelance Actors. Between 1999 and 2004, she worked as a stage manager at the Old Town Studio theatre in Tallinn. She is a founding member and leader of the Tallinn-based Loomine traditional theatre since 2004.

=== Film and television ===
Kaljusaar made her television debut with the role of Ethel in the 1986 Ago-Endrik Kerge directed Eesti Telefilm drama Võtmeküsimus. This was followed by the role of Juta in the 1988 two-part television historical drama Narva kosk, again directed by Kerge and penned by Vladimir Beekman and Enn Vetemaa. The same year, she appeared in the Mikk Mikiver directed television drama Doktor Stockmann for Tallinnfilm. She has also appeared in several television series, including roles on the 1998 TV3 drama Kired, the Eesti Televisioon (ETV) crime drama Ohtlik lend in 2006, the long-running ETV drama Õnne 13 in 2007, the Kanal 2 crime series Kelgukoerad in 2009, and several roles on the TV3 comedy-crime series Kättemaksukontor between 2009 and 2010.

Kaljusaar's first film role was as Mari in the 1989 Kaljo Kiisk-directed Tallinnfilm drama Regina, based on the 1978 novel Valikuvõimalus by Estonian author Aimée Beekman. In 1992, she appeared in the Peeter Urbla directed thriller Daam autos, based on the 1968 novel The Lady in the Car with Glasses and a Gun by French author Sébastien Japrisot.

== Later career ==
Since 2007, Kaljusaar has worked as a project manager for the Padise Abbey museum in Lääne-Harju Parish, and has been a regular contributor to the civil initiative newspaper Padise Teataja.

== Personal life ==
Kaljusaar has been in a long-term relationship with actor Väino Laes since 1980. The couple reside in the village of Padise in Harju County, with a summer home and small farm on the island of Saaremaa.
