= Linnar Priimägi =

Estonian art historian, journalist, literary critic, poet and actor

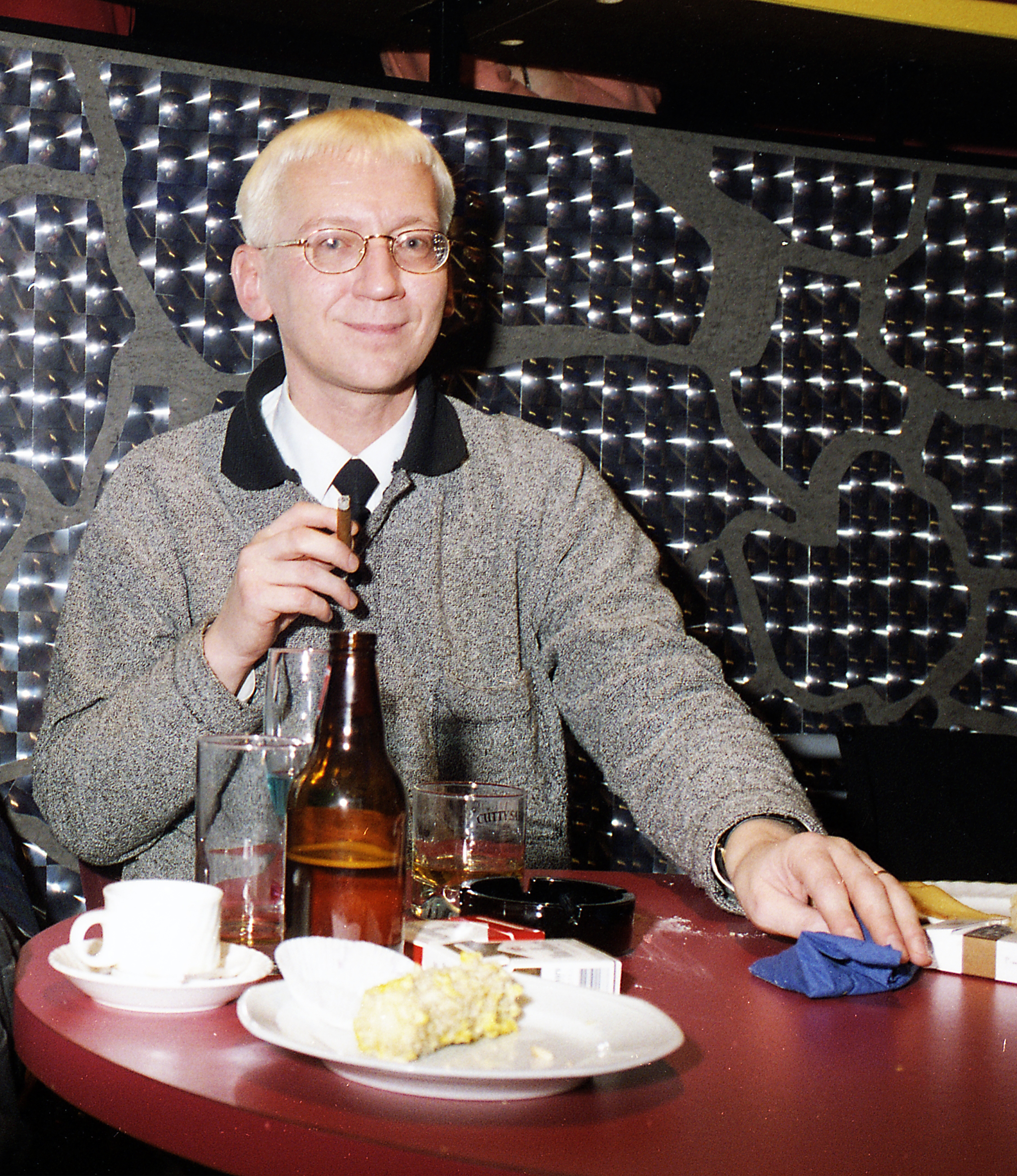
Linnar Priimägi, 1996

Linnar Priimägi (born 29 March 1954) is an Estonian art historian, journalist, literary critic, poet and actor from Tallinn.

He graduated from Tartu State University in philology, Estonian Academy of Arts (master's thesis) and Tallinn University (doctoral thesis).

Priimägi is a docent at Tallinn University. He has taught German language, art history and theory of literary criticism at the University of Tartu, history of philosophy at the Estonian Academy of Music and Theatre, and cultural history at Tallinn Pedagogical University and Tallinn University.

== Filmography ==
- 1973 Tavatu lugu (role: class organizer)
- 1980 Jõulud Vigalas (role: baron Uexküll)
- 1997 Minu Leninid (role: Romberg, German ambassador)
- 2007 Jan Uuspõld läheb Tartusse (role: philologist Linnar)
- 2009 Mis su nimi on? (role: Linnar Priimägi)
- 2017 November (role: kratt Joosep (voice))
