= Anastasiya Makeyeva =

Russian actress and model (born 1981)

- Анастасия Макеева
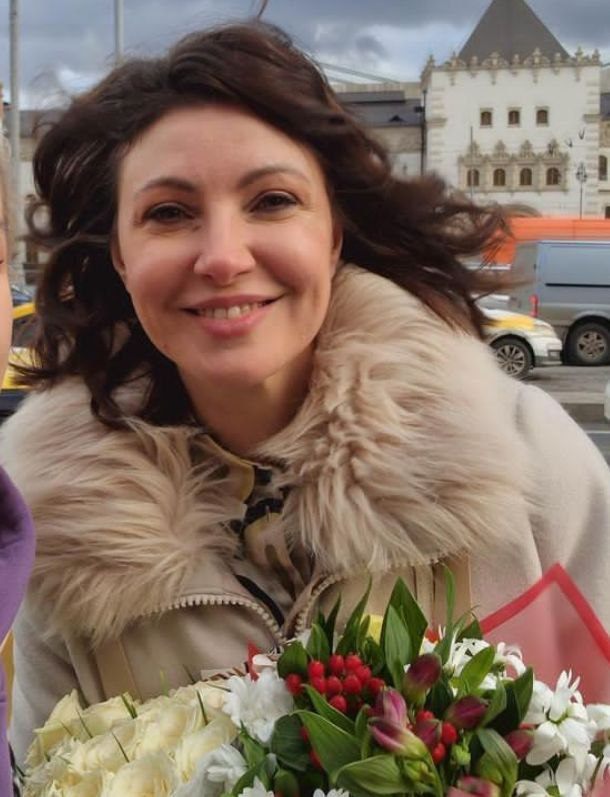
- Makeyeva Kazansky Train Station in Moscow in 2023.
- Born: Anastasiya Vasilevna Makeyeva; December 23, 1981 (age 44); Krasnodar, Krasnodar Krai, RSFSR, USSR
- Occupations: Actress; singer; model
- Years active: 2004–present

Anastasiya Vasilevna Makeyeva (Russian: Анастаси́я Васи́льевна Маке́ева; born December 23, 1981) is a Russian actress, singer and model. She is best known for her roles in Moscow Mission (2006), Sniffer (2013) and Home, Sweet Home... (2008).

== Biography ==
She was born on December 23, 1981, in Krasnodar, Russian SFSR, Soviet Union (now Russia).

In 2008–2010, Anastasiya played the main role of Mercedes in Russia (the only one at that time) production of the musical Monte Cristo. In the summer of 2010, she starred for XXL magazine and in the fall of 2019, she became the cover of magazine Trends People.

Her first husband was actor Pyotr Kislov, 2006; the marriage lasted 7 months. From 2007 to 2008 she met with Alexei Makarov. From August 2010 to July 2016 she was married to actor, singer and composer Gleb Matveychuk. From November 2018 to 2019, she was married to a lawyer and businessman Alexander Sakovich. The fourth husband is Sromik Malkov, May 2021. In marriage, she took the double surname Srakeyeva-Malkova.

== Filmography ==
Year	Work	Role	Notes
2003	Advokat	Nastya	
2004	The Rider Named Death	Elena	
2005	Persona non grata	Anna Golovina	
2006	Moscow Mission	Olga	
2007	Georg	Asta Ots	
2007	Whirlpool	Nika Mstislavovna	Russian language television series
2007	Set	Katya	Russian language television series
2007	Urgently to the room	Tatyana Tumanova	Russian language television series
2008	Home Sweet Home	Inna	
2008	Still, I love…	Katya	Russian language television series
2008	One night of love	Olga Orlova	Russian language television series
2008	To be continued	Ksyusha Korolenko	Russian language television series
2009	Love and hate	Alexandra	Russian language television series
2009	Officers-2	Zinaida	Russian language television series
2009	Maze Rule: Placenta	Rita	Russian language television series
2009	Mistress of the taiga	Regina Reutova	Russian language television series
2009	Private investigation of a retired colonel	Tamara Konysheva	Russian language television series
2010	Permissible Victims	Alisa	Russian language television series
2010	Capital of sin	Lena	Russian language television series
2010	Everyone has their own war	Tamara	Russian language television series
2010	Cherkizon. Disposable people	Lilka	Russian language television series
2010	Sheriff	Anna Varadi	Russian language television series
2011	Homecoming	Vika	Russian language television series
2011	Retribution	Janna	Russian language television series
2011	News	Nastya Chernova	Russian language television series
2011	Mistress of my destiny	Marina Bondar	Russian language television series
2012	Both fathers and children	Galia	Russian language television series
2012	Escape-2	Ella	Russian language television series
2012	Oboroten v pogonakh	Veronika Zorina	
2013	The Sniffer	Sekretar Generala	
2013	Tsezar	Marina Yashina	
2013	Mom under contract	Irina Panfilova	
2013	Amulet	Marina	
2014	Mannequin	Lilya Mirskaya	
2015	Delta. Continuation	Alla	
2015	Fighters. Last Stand	Lydia Serebryanskaya	
2017	Anna Karenina: Vronsky's Story	Betsi Tverskaya	Main character; appeared in all nine episodes
2017	New Year's commotion	Diana	Main character
2017	Caviar	Liudmila Perlova	Main character

=== Musicals ===
- 2002 — «Dracula» — Adriana, Sandra
- 2003 — «Jay wedding» — Magpie, Crow
- 2008 — 2010 — «Monte Cristo» — Mercedes
- 2010 — 2011 — «Zorro» — Luisa
- 2010 — «The Strange Case of Dr. Jekyll and Mr. Hyde» — Emma Carew (2016 — Lucy Harris)
- 2011 — «The Witches of Eastwick» — Alex
- 2012 — «Francois Viyon. Three days in Paris» — Isabella
- 2012 — «Jesus Christ Superstar» — Maria Magdalena
- 2012 — 2013 — «Mamma Mia!» — Donna Sheridan
- 2013 — 2014 — «Chicago» — Roxie Hart
- 2014 — 2016 — «Territory of Passion» — Marquise de Merteuil, Madame de Tourvel
- 2014 — «Master and Margarita» — Margarita
- 2016 — «Onegin» — Tatyana Larina
- 2016 — «Chudo-Yudo» — Murena
- 2018 — «Yoshkin cat» — Raisa
- 2018 — «Lolita» — Anna Vyrubova
- 2019 — «Viy» — Pannochka
- 2020 — «Don Juan. The untold story» — Pilar
- 2020 — «Diamond Chariot» — O-Yumi
- 2021 — «Last Trial» — Takhisis (single interpretation)

== Awards ==
- Winner of the contest "Miss Krasnodar-1998" (1998, Krasnodar)
- Winner of the contest "Miss Academy of Russia-2000" (2000, Moscow)
- Vice-Miss of the Miss MK-Europe contest (2004, Spain)
- Vice-Miss "Miss Universe, Russia" (2004, Moscow)
