= Metskannikesed =

1980 film directed by Kaljo Kiisk

- Directed by: Kaljo Kiisk
- Written by: Isaakas Friedbergas; Grigorijus Kanovičius
- Starring: Tõnu Kark; Rudolf Allabert; Aarne Üksküla; Enn Klooren; Robert Gutman; Arvo Kukumägi; Jüri Järvet; Tõnu Mikiver
- Cinematography: Jüri Sillart
- Edited by: Jüri Müür
- Music by: Lembit Veevo
- Production company: Tallinnfilm
- Release date: 1980
- Running time: 88 minutes
- Country: Estonia
- Language: Estonian

Metskannikesed (English: Wild Violets) is a 1980 Estonian action film directed by Kaljo Kiisk.

Awards, nominations, participations:

- 1980: Soviet Estonia Film Festival (USSR), first prize to Tõnu Virve being the best film artist; first prize to Tõnu Kark, being the best male actor
- 1980: All-Union Film Festival, best cinematographer: Jüri Sillart

== Cast ==
- Tõnu Kark as Rein
- Rudolf Allabert as Andres
- Aarne Üksküla as Juhan
- Enn Klooren as Kristjan
- Robert Gutman as Kalev
- Arvo Kukumägi as Tõnu
- Sulev Luik as Sander
- Jüri Järvet as Apothecary Lipp
- Tõnu Mikiver as Anti
- Tõnu Saar as Lauri
