= Mait Mäekivi =

Estonian cinematographer

Mait Mäekivi (born 8 January 1959 in Kohtla-Järve) is an Estonian cinematographer.

In 1982-88, he studied at Gerasimov Institute of Cinematography. In 1986-91, he worked at Tallinnfilm. From 1991, he is a freelance cinematographer.

In 2007, he was awarded with Order of the White Star, V class.

== Filmography ==
- "Ringhoov" (1987)
- "Äratus" (1989)
- "Vanad ja kobedad saavad jalad alla" (2003)
- "Vanameeste paradiis" (2005)
- "Stiilipidu" (2005)
