= Aarne Üksküla =

Estonian actor

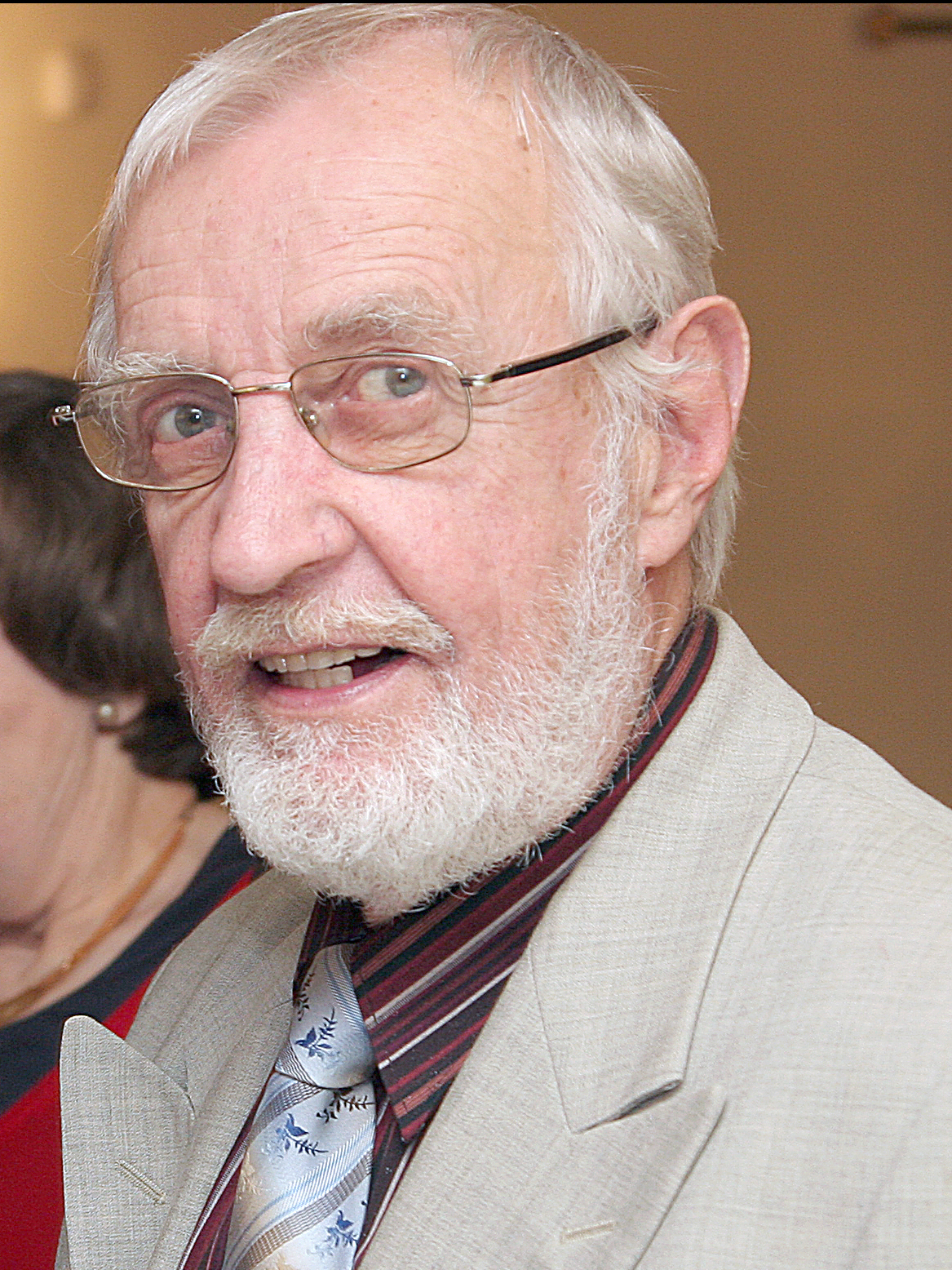
Aarne Üksküla in 2007

Aarne Üksküla (21 September 1937 Tallinn – 29 October 2017) was an Estonian film and stage actor and theatre instructor.

In 1961 he graduated from Tallinn State Conservatory's Performing Arts Department.

== Career ==
- Rakvere Theatre (1961–1968)
- Endla Theatre (1968–1978)
- Estonian Drama Theatre (1985–1988, 1993–2002)
- Tallinn's Old Town Studio (1988–1993).

From 1978 to 2000 he worked at Estonian Academy of Music and Theatre's Drama School. His partner was Maria Klenskaja.

He was a signatory of the Letter of 40 Intellectuals.

== Filmography ==
- A Time to Live and a Time to Love, drama
- All My Lenins, historical comedy
- Lotte from Gadgetville, animation feature
- Dead Mountaineer's Hotel, science fiction mystery
- Wikmani poisid, TV series
- 1981: Karge meri, film by novel
- 2011: A Friend of Mine, drama
- 1973: The Headless Horseman, mystery/romance/Red Western
- 2006: Vana daami visiit
- 1981: Nukitsamees, musical film
- 1980: Ideaalmaastik, drama
- 1990: Autumn
- 1980: Metskannikesed, action
