= Väino Laes =

Estonian actor (born 1951)

Väino Laes (born 26 September 1951 in Jõhvi) is an Estonian actor.

In 1974 he graduated from Tallinn State Conservatory.

From 1978 to 1989 he worked at Rakvere Theatre, 1989–1995 in Estonian Drama Theatre, and since 1995 in Vanalinnastuudio. He has also starred in several films.

In 1992 he was a nominee for the European Film Award for Best Supporting Actor.

Laes has been in a long-term relationship with actress Erika Kaljusaar since 1980. The couple reside in the village of Padise in Harju County, with a summer home and small farm on the island of Saaremaa.

== Selected roles ==
=== Film roles ===
- 1984 Karoliine hõbelõng (feature film)
- 1989 Äratus (feature film, role: Saareaugu Arnold)
- 1990 Sügis (feature film, role: Oskar Luts)
- 1990 See kadunud tee (feature film, role: Riida Oskar)
- 1991 Rahu tänav (feature film, role: Peeter)
- 1993 Tallinn pimeduses (feature film, role: Andreas)
- 1994 Jüri Rumm (feature film, role: Count von Rellingshausen)
- 1998 Kallis härra Q (feature film, role: Uncle Oskar)
- 2002 Nimed marmortahvlil (feature film)
- 2010 Taevavõti (feature film)
- 2012 Üksik saar (feature film)
- 2012 Distants (short film, role: Father)
- 2014 Väikelinna detektiivid (television series, role: Bishop)
