= Peeter Laurits =

Estonian artist and photographer

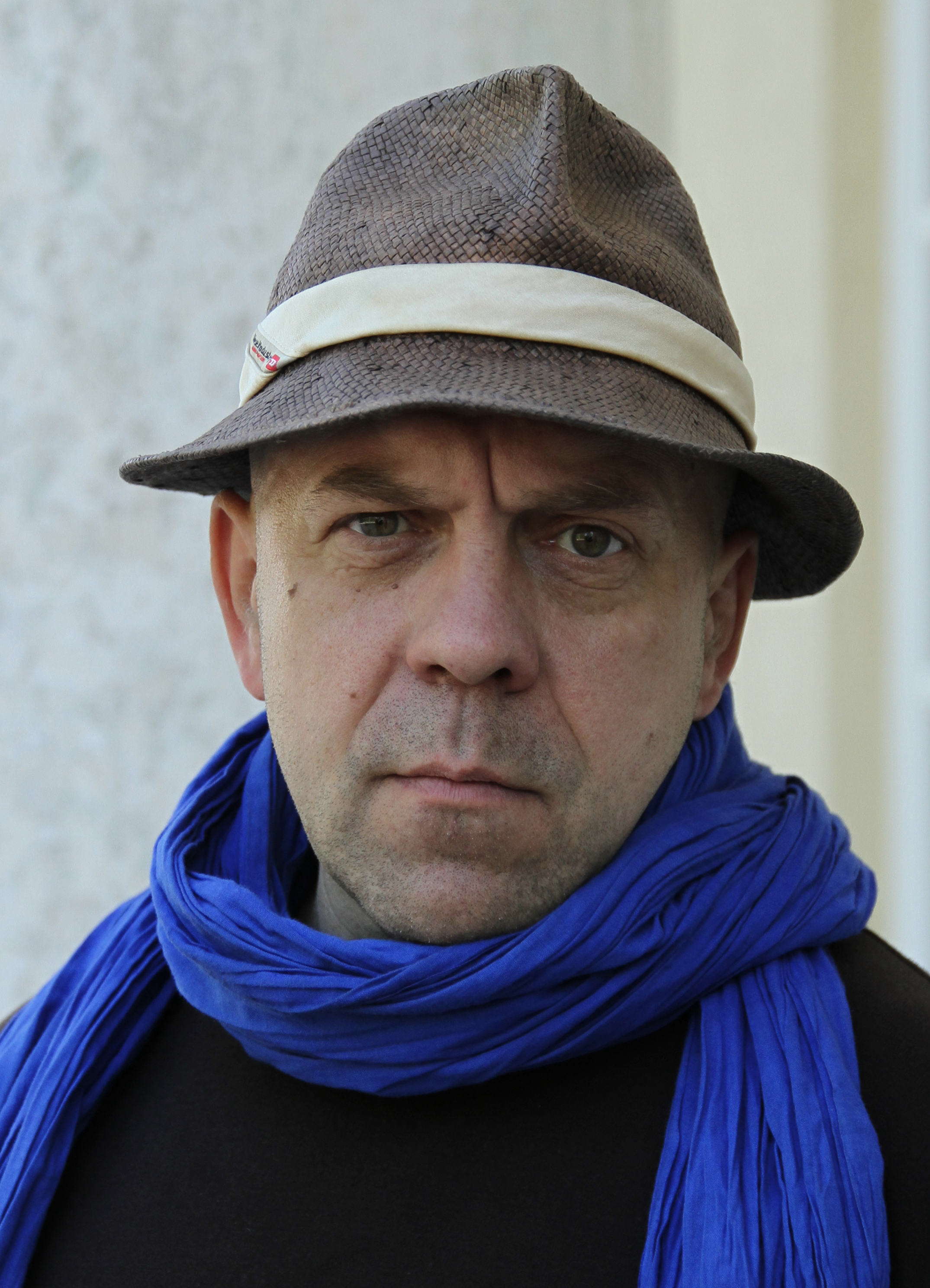
- Born: Tallinn, then part of Estonian SSR, Soviet Union
- Website: https://www.peeterlaurits.com/

Peeter Laurits (born in 1962 in Tallinn) is an Estonian artist and photographer.

Since the 1990s he has exhibited his works at numerous exhibitions. His works are strongly related to photography.

He has been a founder of several artistical collectives, including Igavesti Sinu, DeStudio, and Kütioru Avatud Ateljee.

In 2005 he was awarded the Order of the White Star, V class.

== Gallery ==
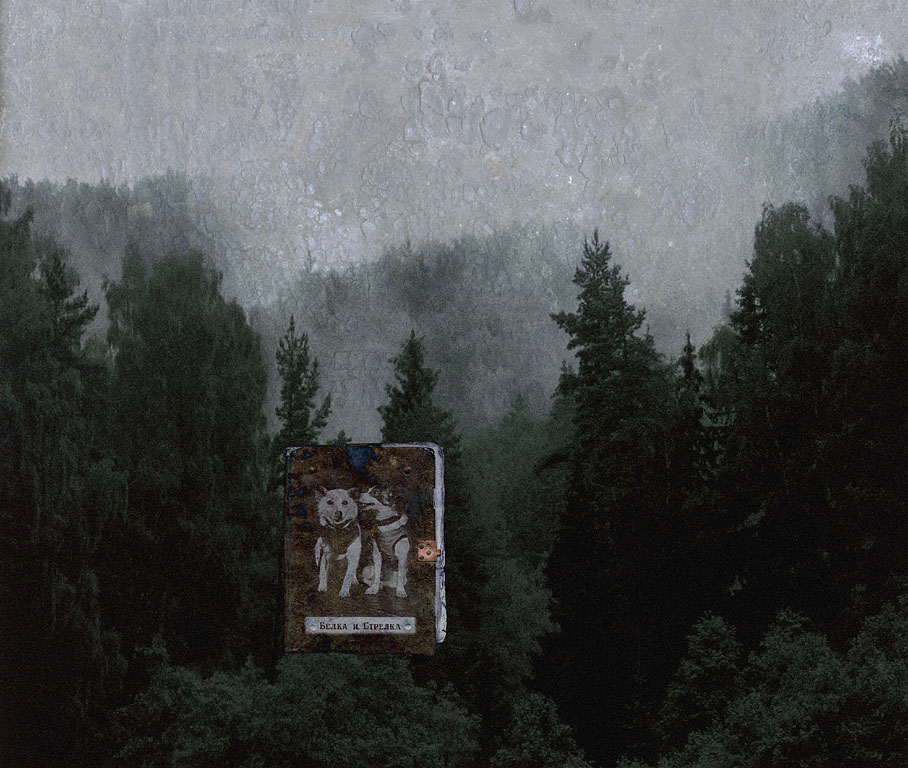
Evenings at Woods, 1999

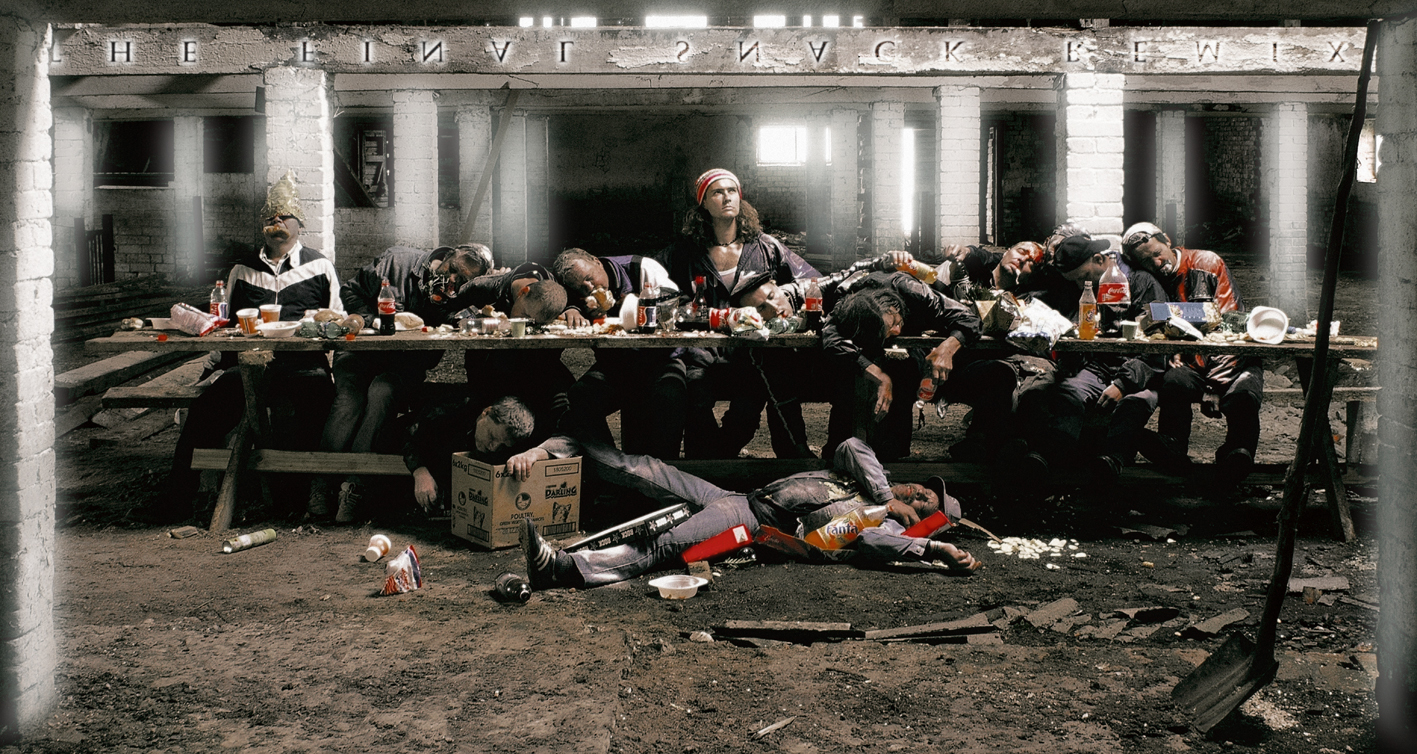
"The Final Snack Remix"

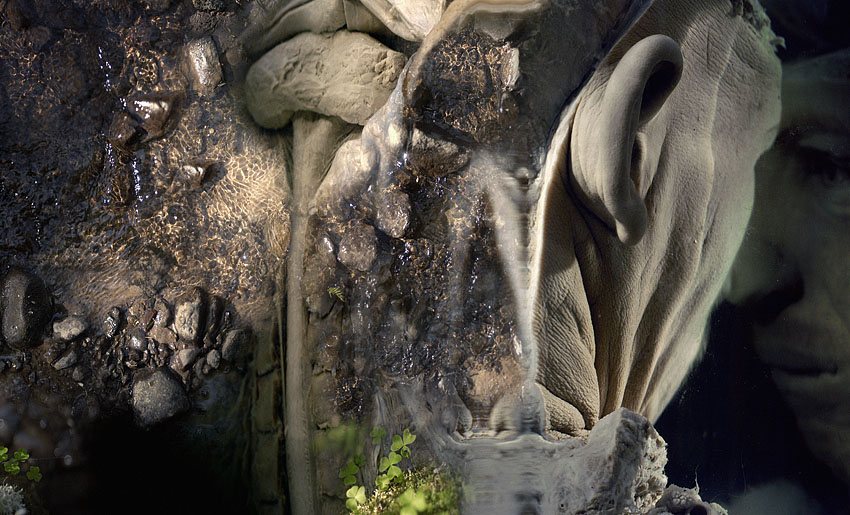
Estonian: Narcissos vaatab pimenevat peegelpilti

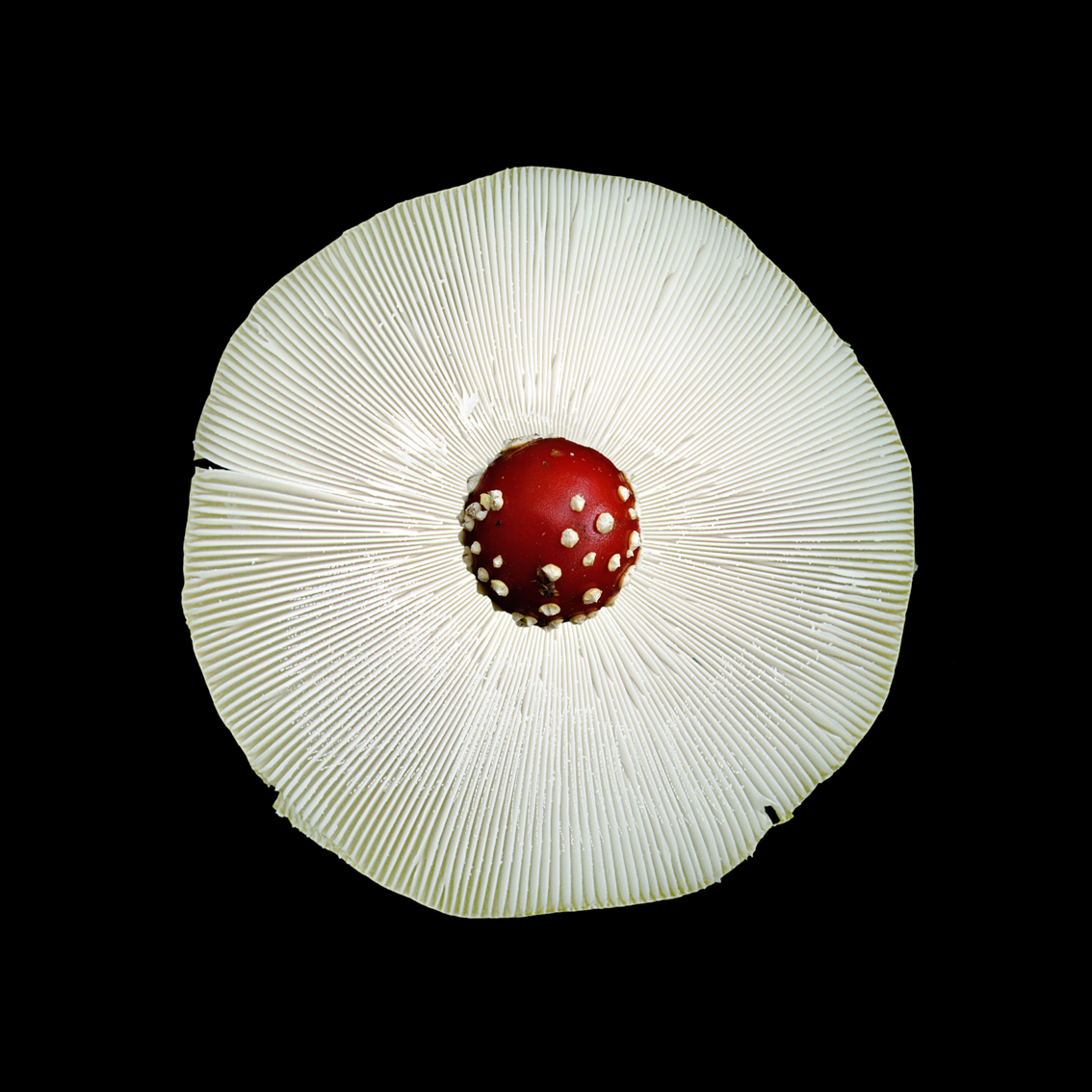
Estonian: Taeva Atlas 47
