= Georg (film) =

2007 film directed by Peeter Simm

- Directed by: Peeter Simm
- Written by: Mati Põldre; Alexander Borodyansky
- Produced by: Märten Kross; Ivo Felt
- Starring: Marko Matvere; Renārs Kaupers; Anastasiya Makeyeva; Elle Kull; Tõnu Kark; Mirtel Pohla
- Cinematography: Rein Kotov
- Music by: Yuri Poteyenko
- Production companies: Lege Artis Film; Allfilm; Central National Film; Matila Rohr Productions
- Release date: 5 October 2007
- Running time: 105 minutes
- Countries: Estonia; Finland; Russia
- Languages: Estonian; Finnish; Russian
- Budget: 32 million EEK

Georg is a 2007 biography drama film about the Estonian singer Georg Ots. It was directed by Peeter Simm and written by Mati Põldre and Alexander Borodyansky. The film features Marko Matvere, Anastasiya Makeyeva and Renārs Kaupers.

The film was released in Estonia on 5 October 2007. Georg was produced in Estonia, Russia and Finland, and the film runs approximately 105 minutes. Georg was shot in Tallinn, Helsinki and Moscow.

== Cast ==
- Marko Matvere as Georg Ots
- Anastasiya Makeyeva as Asta Ots
- Renārs Kaupers as Caesar
- Elle Kull as Lydia Ots
- Tõnu Kark as Karl Ots
- Mirtel Pohla as Margot
- Karin Touart as Ilona
- Rein Oja as Richard
- Aleksander Okunev as Nikolaev
- Sergey Fetissov as Nikita Khrushchev
- Bert Raudsepp as painter
- Indrek Taalmaa as Taleš
- Hele Kõre as Asta Ots (voice)
- Andero Ermel as Caesar (voice)
