= Tõnis Seesmaa =

Estonian politician and engineer

Tõnis Seesmaa (born 3 October 1955) is an Estonian politician and engineer. He was an alternate member of VIII Riigikogu, representing the Estonian Coalition Party.

He was born in Tartu and graduated with a degree as a forestry engineer from the Estonian Agricultural University in 1979.
