= Tõnu Virve =

Estonian theatre and film designer and artist (1946–2019)

Tõnu Virve (18 June 1946 in Rõuge – 1 October 2019 in Tallinn) was an Estonian theatre and film designer and artist, producer and director.

In 1974 he graduated from the Estonian State Art Institute in theatre decoration speciality. 1975–1980 he was the principal artist at Estonian Youth Theatre. 1980–1990 he was an artist-director at Tallinnfilm. In 1990 he established the independent film studio Freyja Film (ERSFF).

== Filmography ==
- 1979: "Hukkunud Alpinisti hotell" (stage artist)
- 1980: "Metskannikesed" (stage artist, costume artist)
- 1991: "Surmatants" (director, scenarist, producer)
