= Tiit Härm =

Estonian ballet dancer, ballet master and choreographer (1946–2025)

Tiit Härm (19 March 1946 – December 2025) was an Estonian ballet dancer, ballet master, choreographer and actor.

== Life and career ==
Tiit Härm was born in Tallinn on 19 March 1946. He was the younger brother of actress and author Viiu Härm. From 1957 to 1962, he studied at Tallinn Choreographic School. In 1966, he graduated from Leningrad Choreographic School. From 1966 to 1967, he was a dancer at Estonia Theatre. From 1967 to 1972, he was a soloist at All-Union Choreographic Collective Noor Ballett. From 1972, he worked again at the Estonia Theatre. From 2001 to 2009, he was the ballet manager, principal ballet master and choreographer of the Estonia Theatre.

In 2014, he established his own ballet theatre. He also appeared as an actor in several films.

== Death ==
Härm died in December 2025, at the age of 79.

== Awards ==
- 2001: Order of the White Star, IV class.

== Filmography ==
- Tantsib Tiit Härm (1975, Tallinnfilm documentary)
- Hukkunud Alpinisti hotell (1979, Tallinnfilm)
- Anna Pavlova: A Woman for All Time (1983, Soviet Union and Great Britain television miniseries)
- Sädelev maailm (1984, Mosfilm)
