= Aleksander Kesküla =

Estonian politician and revolutionary

Aleksander Eduard Kesküla (21 March [O.S. 9 March] 1882 in Saadjärve Parish, Kreis Dorpat – 17 June 1963 in Madrid, Spain) was an Estonian politician and revolutionary.

Kesküla studied politics and economics in the universities of Tartu, Berlin, Zürich, Leipzig and Bern.

In 1905, he was a Bolshevik with the pseudonym Kivi and endeavoured to create strife inside the Russian Empire and, according to Elisabeth Heresch, he was working alongside the Japanese spy's, Motojiro Akashi.

In 1913 he became an Estonian nationalist and wanted to play a role in the world's political arena. In 1914-1915, he informed the German government about Lenin´s plans and intended to use Bolshevik agitation to replace the Russian empire with a number of national states. Some earlier scholarship expressed skepticism, but other research has indicated that between 200,000 - 500,000 German Reichsmark was passed to Lenin by Germany using Kesküla as a conduit.

Michael Futrell interviewed Kesküla whilst researching his book 1958-63. Here, Futrell records that although Kesküla had only minimal contact with Lenin, he nevertheless passed money to him through another Estonian, Arthur Siefeldt, who drip fed the money into Bolsheviks hands by making a series of small secret donations. Other researches claim Kesküla had given the Germans little of substance and he did not deliver any significant sums to the Bolsheviks.

In 1918, he founded the Estonian Office in Stockholm to seek the support of the Entente states for Estonian independence. He acted in such status, until the official Estonian delegation forbade him to do that. The Estonian delegation was skeptical about Kesküla and considered him a German agent.

Central in Kesküla's thought was the region of Baltic Sea. According to Kesküla's approach, Estonia had originally belonged to the Nordic region, but as a result of the German conquest in the 13th century it was included in the alien Central European cultural space. It then re-established its Nordic heritage in the 16-17th centuries and in the 18th century fell under the yoke of the even more alien Eastern European (Russian) sphere. Kesküla thought that Estonia should separate from Russia and restore its place among the Nordic countries that were becoming increasingly unified.

In his later years, Kesküla acted as the teacher of politics for several young Spanish scientists.
