= Tõnis Erilaid =

Estonian journalist (1943–2025)

Tõnis Erilaid (26 September 1943 – 2 August 2025) was an Estonian journalist.

== Life and career ==
Erilaid studied at the Tallinn 10. Secondary School, which he dropped out of, later graduated from the evening high school in Tallinn. In 1985, he graduated from Tartu State University via distance learning, majoring in Estonian language and literature.

Erilaid worked at Õhtuleht from the spring of 1971. From 1992 to 1996, he was the editor-in-chief of Õhtuleht. Erilaid was the host of the Saturday program "Midnight Program" at Vikerraadio alongside Olavi Pihlamäe.

In 1989 he was awarded the Merited Journalist of the Estonian SSR, and in 2013, he was awarded the Kuldmikrofon ("Golden Microphone"). In 2022, he was awarded the Order of the White Star, V Class.

Erilaid died on 2 August 2025, at the age of 81.
