= Peeter Simm =

Estonian film director (1953–2026)

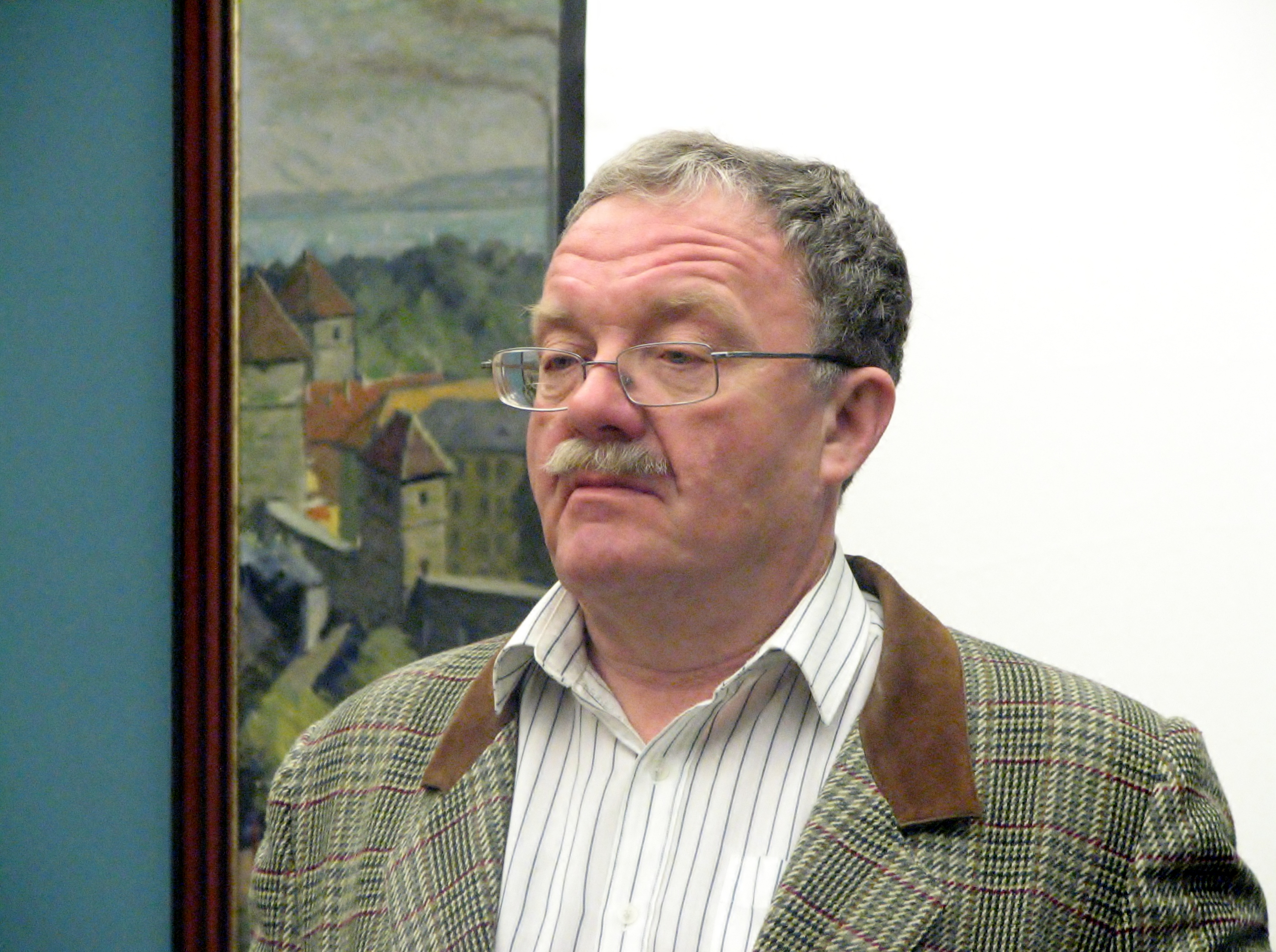
Simm in 2012

Peeter Simm (24 February 1953 – 12 March 2026) was an Estonian film director.

== Life and career ==
Born in Kiviõli on 24 February 1953, he graduated in 1976 from the All-Union State Institute of Cinematography (VGIK).

Simm died on 12 March 2026, at the age of 73.

== Selected filmography ==
- Ideaalmaastik (1980)
- Fed up! (2005)
- On the Other Side of Leprosy (2006)
- Georg (2007)
- Circulation of the Blood (2011)
- Lonely Island (2012)
- Englas. Old Warrior (2015)
- Koma (2018)
- Taagepera (2019)
- Vangis ja vabaduses (2019)
- On the Water (2020)
