= Rudolf Allabert =

Estonian actor, director, and theatrical pedagogue

Rudolf Allabert (3 September 1939 Gatchina, Leningrad Oblast – 10 March 2011 Tallinn) was an Estonian actor, director and theatrical pedagogue.

Until 1961 he worked at Rakvere Theatre. In 1965 he graduated from Tallinn State Conservatory. Allabert was a founding member of the Estonian State Youth Theatre.

In 2006 he was awarded with Order of the White Star, IV class. Following his death in 2011, he was interred at Tallinn's Forest Cemetery.

== Selected filmography ==
- Keskpäevane praam (Jumbu; 1967)
- Inimesed sõdurisinelis (Kalm; 1968)
- Metskapten (Lauri; 1971)
- Tuuline rand (Coxswain; 1971)
- Verekivi (Kaspar; 1972)
- Indrek (Priimus; 1975)
- Surma hinda küsi surnutelt (1977)
- Karikakramäng (Robert; 1977)
- Tuulte pesa (Jüri Piir; 1979)
- Metskannikesed (Andres; 1980)
- Naerata ometi (1985)
- Saja aasta pärast mais (1986)
- Dubultnieks (1986)
- Viktoriya (1988)
- Surmatants (Estonian: Lübecki raehärra; 1991)
- Wikmani poisid (Mister Tooder; 1995)
- Misiganes, Aleksander! (Old Man; 2007)
