= Tiina Lokk =

Estonian filmmaker, film teacher and politician (born 1955)

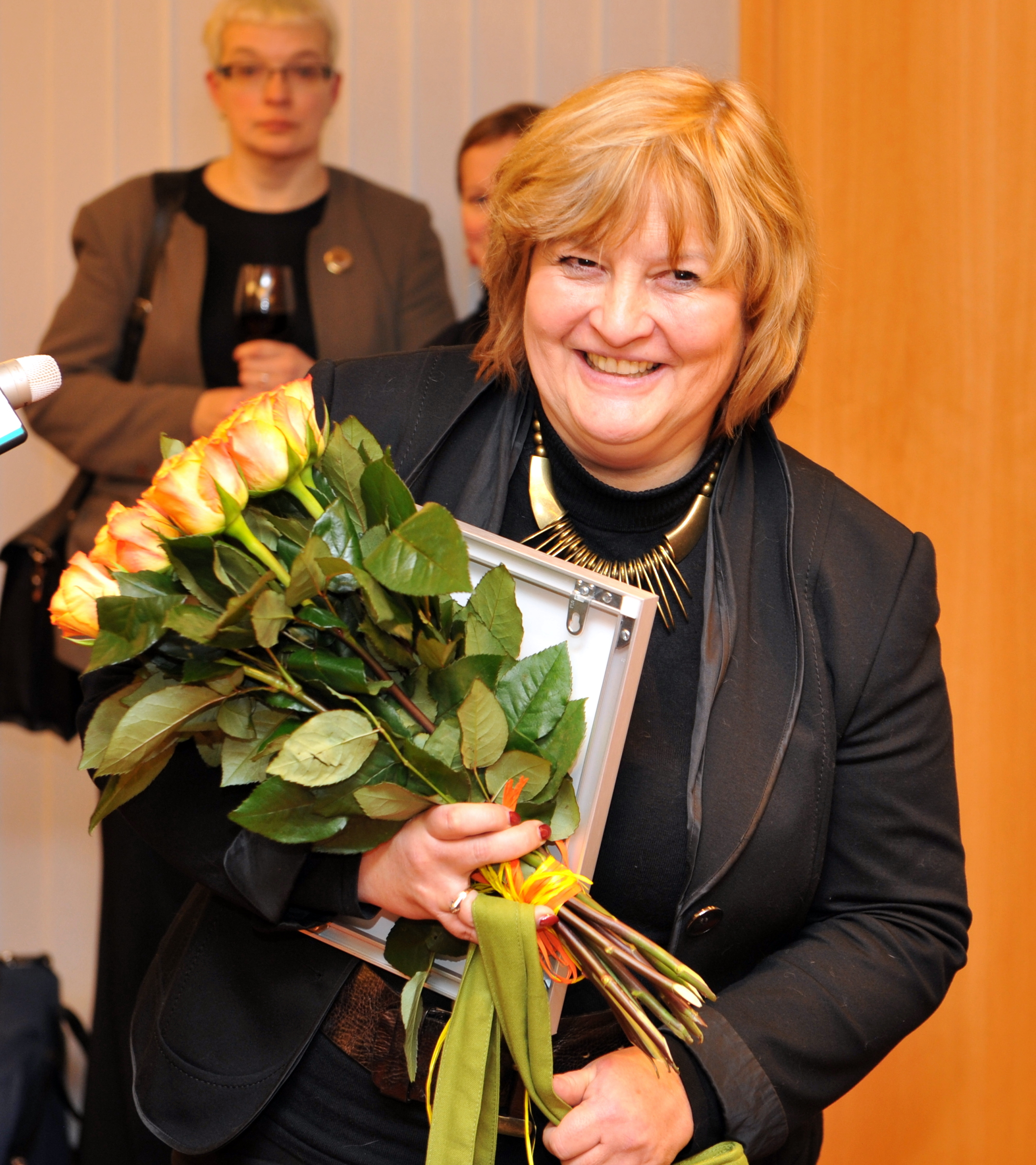
Tiina Lokk receiving the Foreign Ministry Culture Prize in 2011.

Tiina Lokk-Tramberg (born 1 October 1955) is an Estonian filmmaker, film teacher and politician, who was a member of the Riigikogu from 2012 to 2015, representing the Estonian Reform Party.

== Early life and education ==
Born in Tallinn, Lokk graduated from the Gerasimov Institute of Cinematography in Moscow with a degree in film theory and criticism.

== Career ==
Since 1997, she has been the director of the Tallinn Black Nights Film Festival, and later became a member of the European Film Academy. She also has been a member of the editorial board, screenwriter and art council of Tallinnfilm for a decade before being a freelance journalist for the Tallinn Black Nights Film Festival. She then founded and directed the movie label FilmaMAX. She has been a lecturer in the Estonian Academy of Music and Theater (cultural organization) and the Estonian Academy of Arts (teaching film history, film scripts and management of cultural projects) and a professor of scriptwriting at the Baltic Film and Media School. On 21 May 2012, the Tallinn University senate elected Lokk as Professor of Film and Art at the Baltic Film and Media School.

She has been a member of the Estonian Reform Party since 2006 and was a member of the Riigikogu from 2012 to 2015. She was promoted to the Riigikogu as an alternate member as later prime minister Taavi Rõivas became Minister of Social Affairs and Jaanus Rahumägi, who had originally replaced him, withdrew from the Riigikogu.

== Personal life ==
Lokk has two daughters: Triin and Martina.

Her hobbies include cooking, hiking, and travelling.

Lokk's favorite films include One Flew Over the Cuckoo's Nest, Citizen Kane, Amarcord, and Pulp Fiction.

== Awards ==
- 5th class of the Order of the White Star (received 22 February 2002)
- Foreign Ministry Culture Prize, 2010
