= Sorbonne square =

Public square in Paris, France

Coordinates: 48.84866°N 2.34237°E

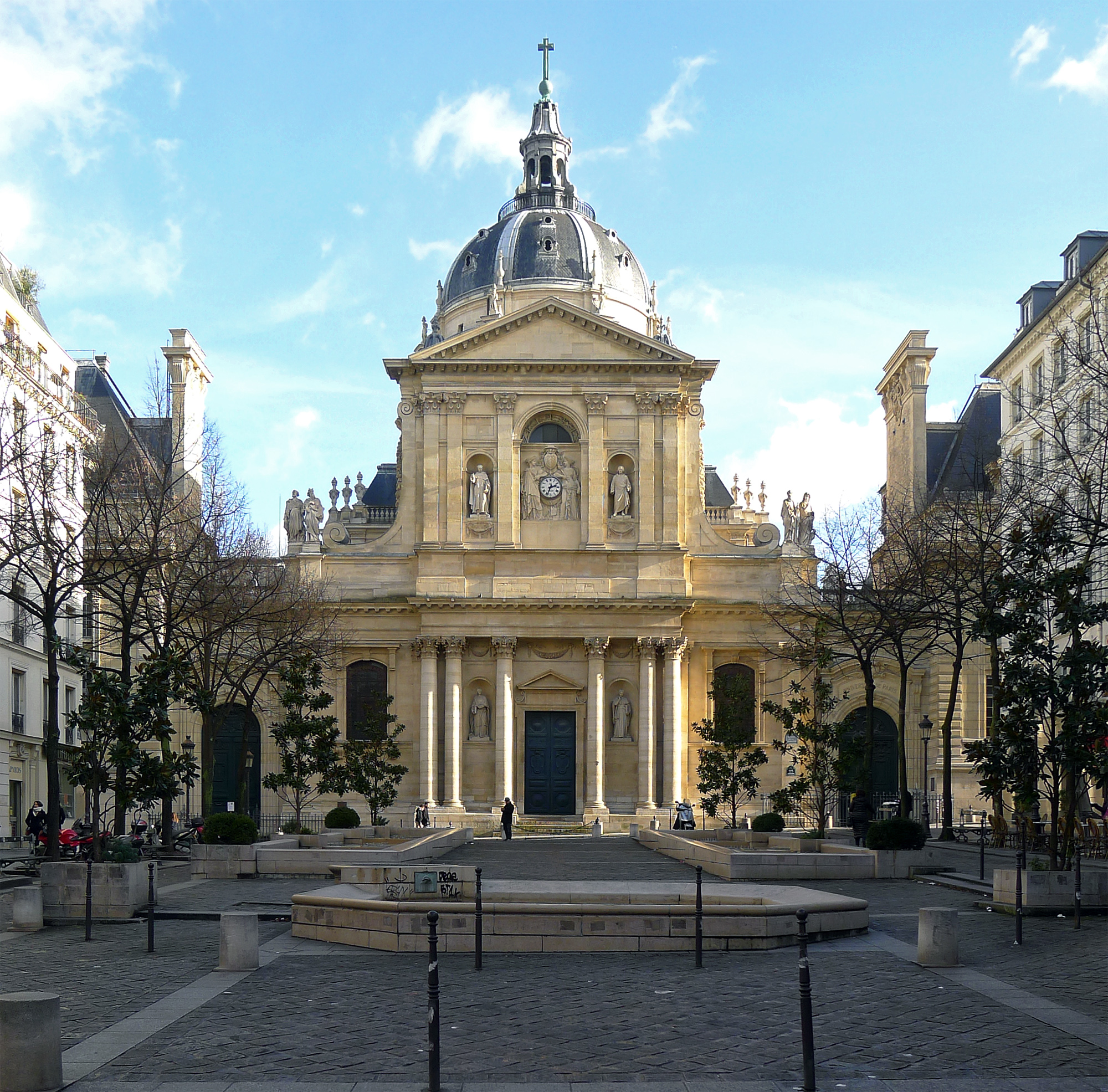
View of the Sorbonne Chapel from Sorbonne square

The Sorbonne square is a public space located in the Latin Quarter in Paris' 5th arrondissement, France.

Its limits are defined by:

- On its eastern side: Victor Cousin street (and the Sorbonne Chapel across it).
- On its western side: Saint-Michel boulevard
- On its northern side (partially): Champollion street

The square takes its name from the Sorbonne building on its eastern side (across Victor Cousin street).

== History ==
The square was opened in 1639, and its activities have been linked to the proximity of the Sorbonne universities and other education institutions in the latin quarter.

In 1980 the plane trees were replaced by silver lindens and a new fountain was installed. Auguste Comte's monument was moved to the west of the square.

In 2000 a preventive archaeological excavation (preceding new works on the square) discovered the ruins of two 1st century houses, a 2nd century cellar and a short section of a Roman road.

== Access ==
The square can be reached with the metro 10 line at station Cluny-La Sorbonne, the RER B at station Gare du Luxembourg and several bus lines.

== In film ==
The square is portrayed in Jacques Rivette's "Paris nous appartient" (1961).
