= Ago Ruus =

Estonian film cinematographer and director

Ago Ruus (born on 4 August 1949 Vastseliina, Võru County) is an Estonian film cinematographer and director.

In 1979 he graduated from All-Russian State Institute of Cinematography.

From 1970 to 1971, 1973 to 1974, and 1979 to 1993 he worked at Tallinnfilm. In 1996 he established the film studio PROfilm. Since 2003 he has been the artistic director (Estonian: kunstiline juht) of Matsalu International Nature Film Festival.

In 2007 he was awarded with Order of the White Star, V class.

== Filmography ==
- "Kõrboja peremees" (1979)
- "Nukitsamees" (1981)
- "Šlaager" (1982)
- "Suletud ring" (1983) (television feature film)
- "Karoliine hõbelõng" (1984)
- "Puud olid ..." (1985)
- "Metsluiged" (1987)
- "Tants aurukatla ümber" (1987) (television feature film)
- "Doktor Stockmann" (1988) (television feature film)
- "Inimene, keda polnud" (1989)
- "Ainult hulludele ehk halastajaõde" (1990)
- "Rahu tänav" (1991)
- "Lammas all paremas nurgas" (1992)
- "Hüsteeria" ('Hysteria') (1993)
- "Ameerika mäed" (1994)
- "Ma olen väsinud vihkamast" (1995)
