= Moscow Mission (2006 film) =

Russian movie directed by Vadim Shmelyov

- Directed by: Vadim Shmelyov
- Screenplay by: Denis Karyshev
- Produced by: Ilya Neretin; Valery Todorovsky; Vitaly Yerenkov
- Starring: Andrey Merzlikin; Leonid Yarmolnik; Oksana Akinshina
- Cinematography: Yury Raysky
- Edited by: Alla Strelnikova
- Music by: Dmitry Dankov
- Production company: Rekun TV
- Distributed by: Central Partnership
- Release date: November 2, 2006 (Russia)
- Running time: 110 min.
- Country: Russia
- Language: Russian
- Budget: 4 million $

Moscow Mission (or Countdown, Russian: Обратный отсчёт, romanized: Obratnyy otschet) is a Russian action movie directed by Vadim Shmelyov. The movie was released in Moscow in 2006.

== Plot ==
There will be an explosion exactly in 48 hours in Moscow. The information was provided by an agent who was killed this very second. All Intelligence Services work on it, but the only hope is for recently organized independent team. They are a hacker girl who once broke through Pentagon servers, a former special operative officer who enjoys speed and adrenalin, psychologist, a lady whose beauty outshines her intelligence and her rank of major, and a blind field engineer whose sense of smell and intuition substitute for his eyesight... And the Chief who got them all together and learned how to control them.

Only this team is able to figure it out who, and most importantly where, by knowing just when...

== Cast ==
- Andrey Merzlikin as Maks
- Maksim Sukhanov as Starshiy (Denis)
- Leonid Yarmolnik as Krot
- Oksana Akinshina as Anna
- Oleg Stefan as Martin
- Aleksandr Ustyugov as Martin's aid
- Andrey Ilyin as Grishin
- Anastasiya Makeyeva as Olga
- Pavel Smetankin as Hadid
- James Derrick as Agent Kevin

== See also ==
- Countdown, another similar Russian action film
