= Tõnu Kark =

Estonian actor

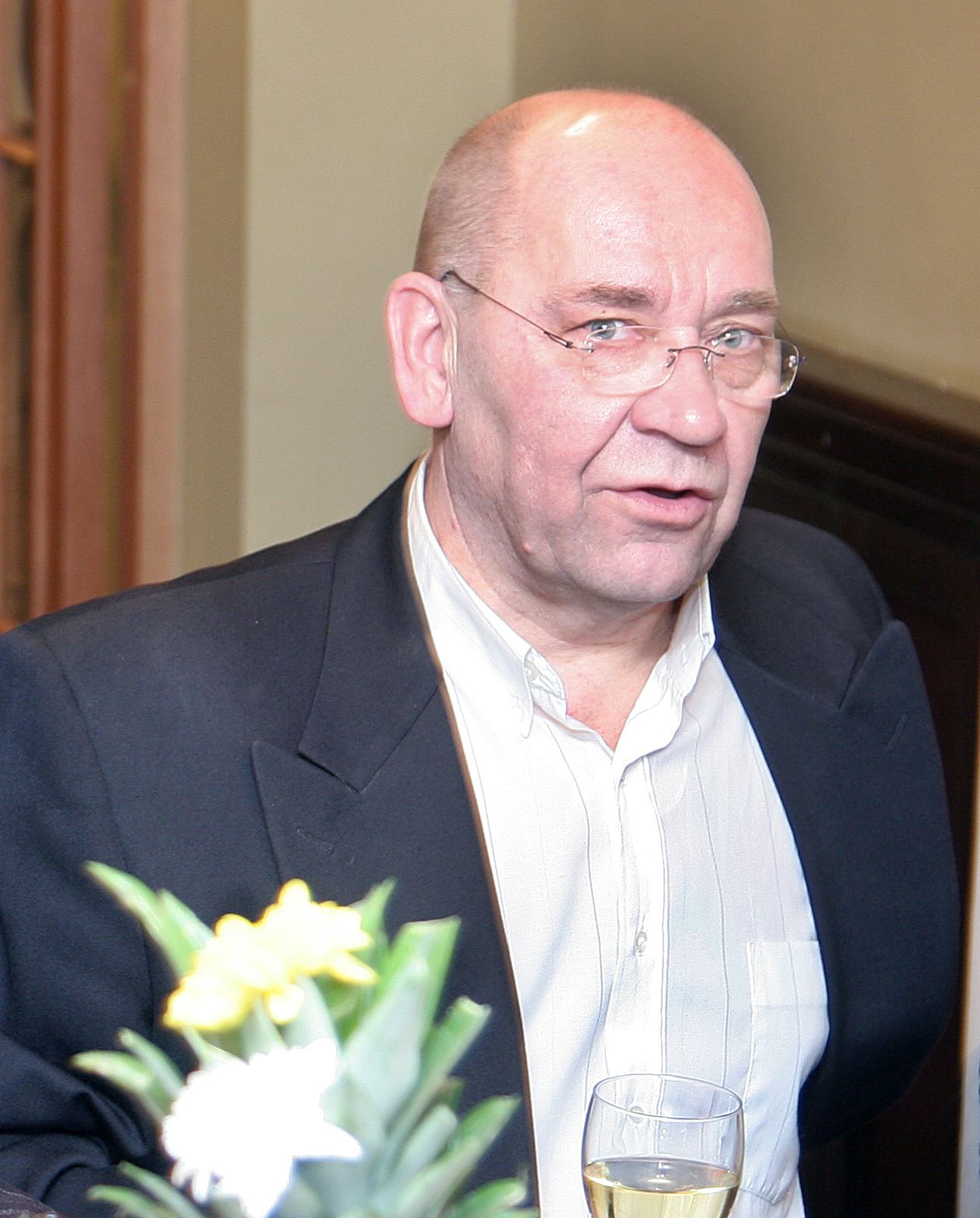
Tõnu Kark (2007)

Tõnu Kark (born 4 December 1947 in Tallinn) is an Estonian actor. His older brother is actor and caricaturist Feliks Kark.

== Notable roles ==
Notable film roles:

- Nest of Winds (1979)
- Metskannikesed (1980)
- Nukitsamees (1981)
- Äratus (1989)
- Firewater (1994)
- Screwed in Tallinn (1999)
- Good Hands (2001)
- Lilya 4-ever (2002)
- Waterbomb for the Fat Tomcat (2004)
- The Power of Fear (2006)
- Lotte from Gadgetville (2006)
- The Visit of the Old Lady (2006)
- Georg (2007)
- December Heat (2008)
- Devil Incarnate (2008)
- Circulation of the Blood (2011)
- Lotte and the Moonstone Secret (2011)
- Rat Trap (2011)
- Family Lies (2016)
- Green Cats (2017)
- The Dissidents (2017)
- Johannes Pääsukese tegelik elu (2019)
- Christmas In The Jungle (2020)
