= Tants aurukatla ümber =

1971 novel by Mats Traat

- Cover of 2005 published version.
- Language: Estonian
- Publication place: Estonia

Tants aurukatla ümber (English: Dance Around the Steam Boiler) is a novel by Estonian author Mats Traat, first published in 1971. The novel is notable for its exploration of rural life in Estonia through various historical periods.

The novel is structured into five chapters, each representing a different era of rural life in 20th-century Estonia. The "dance" metaphorically illustrates the transitions and changes within the country's rural environment over time.

== Television film ==
The novel, originally conceived as a film scenario, was adapted into a television movie by director Peeter Simm in 1987 for Eesti Televisioon (ETV). The film features cinematography by Ago Ruus and music by Erkki-Sven Tüür. The cast includes Heino Mandri, Rudolf Allabert, Egert Soll, Arvo Kukumägi, Jüri Järvet, Kärt Kross, Ita Ever, Sulev Luik, Paul Poom, Kaljo Kiisk, Inga-Kai Puskar, Uve Urbla, Liina Tennosaar, Tarvo Hanno Varres, Lennart Mänd, Laine Mägi, and Aire Koop.

Filming took place during the period of perestroika and glasnost, and the adaptation remains faithful to the book. With Mats Traat's involvement, the film incorporated a sixth chapter, which depicts the late-1980s Soviet era. This additional chapter illustrates the old age and warmth of the main characters against the backdrop of the industrial and technological developments, and environmental degradation typical of the 1980s.

The film holds a significant place in Estonian historiography and culture, reflecting both the historical context of the Soviet era and the rural experience depicted in the novel.
