= Olav Neuland =

Estonian film director

Olav Neuland (often spelled wrongly Olev Neuland; 29 April 1947 Viljandi – 21 May 2005 Anija) was an Estonian film director.

He died on May 21, 2005, while piloting a trike. He was buried in Pärnamäe Cemetery.

== Filmography ==
- "Tuulte pesa" (1979)
- "Corrida" (1982)
- "Reekviem" (1984)
- "Hundiseaduse aegu" (1984)
- "Näkimadalad" (1988) (short series)
