= Tõnu Mikiver =

Estonian actor

Tõnu Mikiver (2 August 1943 Loksa – 21 March 2017 Tallinn) was an Estonian actor.

== Career ==
In 1965 he graduated from the Tallinn State Conservatory's Performing Arts Department. From 1965 until 1977, he worked at Estonian Youth Theatre and from 1977 until 2007, at the Estonian Drama Theatre. Besides theatre roles, he has played also in several films.

== Family ==
His older brother was an actor Mikk Mikiver.

== Selected filmography ==
- 1968: Inimesed sõdurisinelis (feature film)
- 1978: Reigi õpetaja (feature film)
- 1980: Metskannikesed (feature film; roll: Anti)
- 1995: Tallinna legendid (animated film; in role: voice)
- 2008: Tuulepealne maa (television series; in role: Einar Soodla)
- 2010: Punane elavhõbe (feature film; in role: Eduard Janovitš)
- 2012: Eestlanna Pariisis (feature film; in role: Endel)
