= Feliks Kark =

Estonian actor and caricaturist

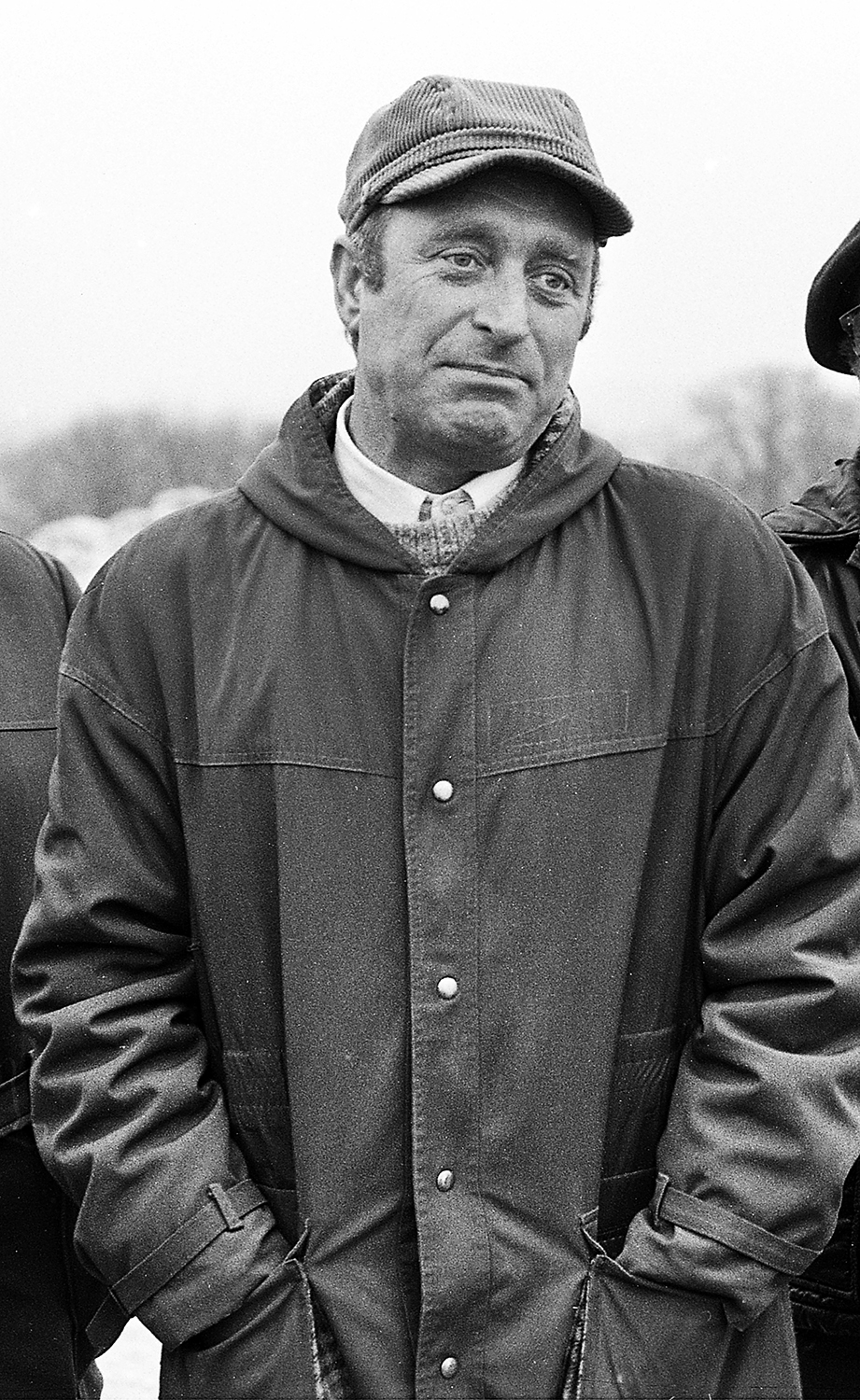
Feliks Kark

Feliks Kark (born 13 December 1933 in Tallinn) is an Estonian actor and caricaturist.

From 1965 to 1986, he worked at Rakvere Theatre. Since 1986 he is working at Endla Theatre. He has also played in several films.

In 2015, he was awarded with Order of the White Star, IV class. His younger brother is actor Tõnu Kark.
