= Olav Ehala =

Estonian composer

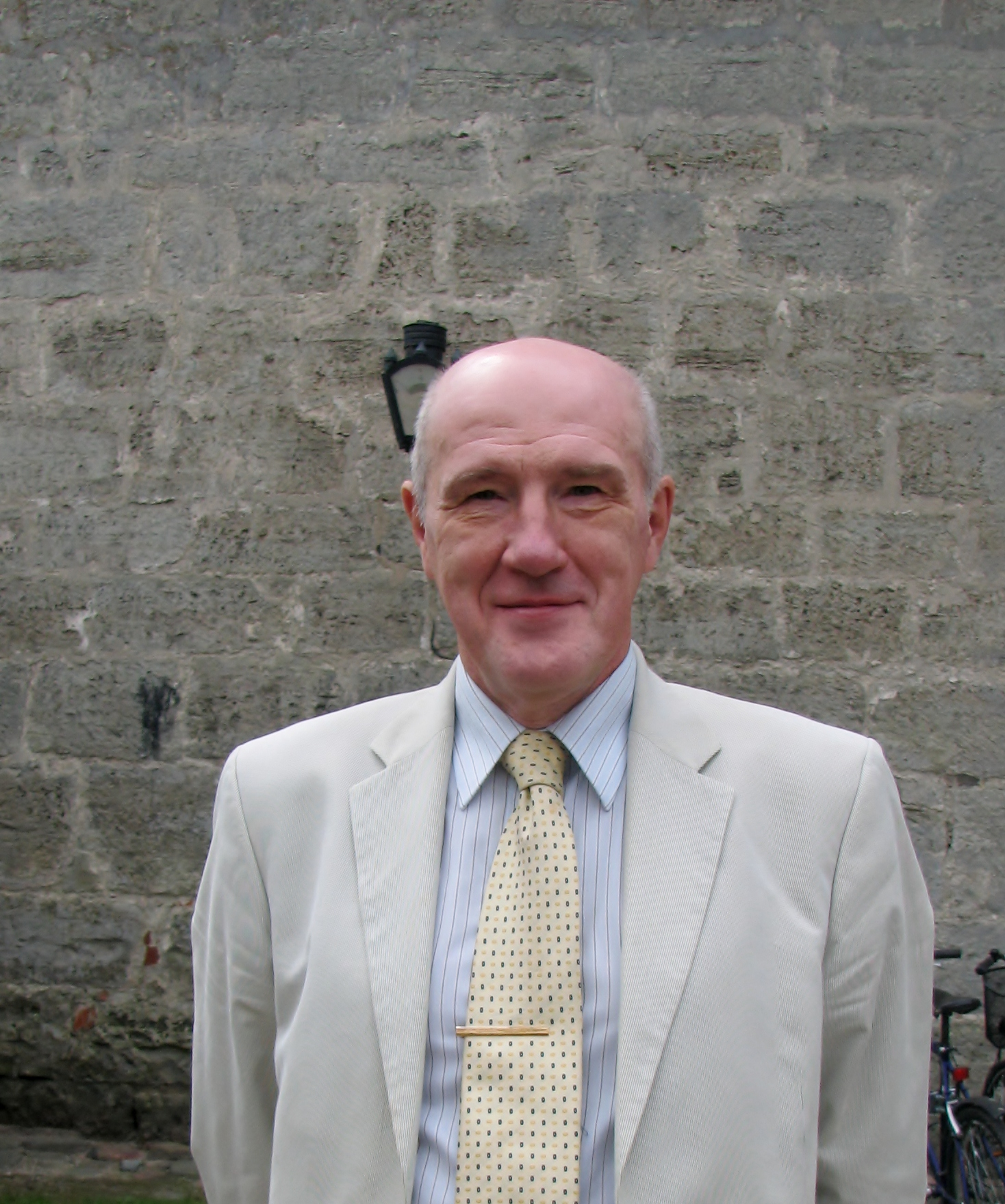
Olav Ehala in 2012

Olav Ehala (born 31 July 1950), is an Estonian composer.

Ehala was born in Tallinn. In 1969, he graduated from Tallinn Music School and then studied composition under Eugen Kapp at the Tallinn State Conservatory, graduating in 1974. From 1975 to 1991 he was the music director for the Estonian State Youth Theater. Since 1991 he has been teaching at the Estonian Academy of Music and Theatre and is currently a Professor Emeritus of Music Pedagogy.

Ehala has been a member of both the Estonian Theatre Union and the Estonian Composers' Union since 1977, having been a chairman for the latter between 2001 and 2014.

He has composed, arranged, and been a pianist for the ensemble Kiigelaulukuuik since 1989 and is a member of many other musical collectives.

He has written music for over 70 plays and 60 films.
