= Estonian Youth Song and Dance Festival =

Estonian youth festival

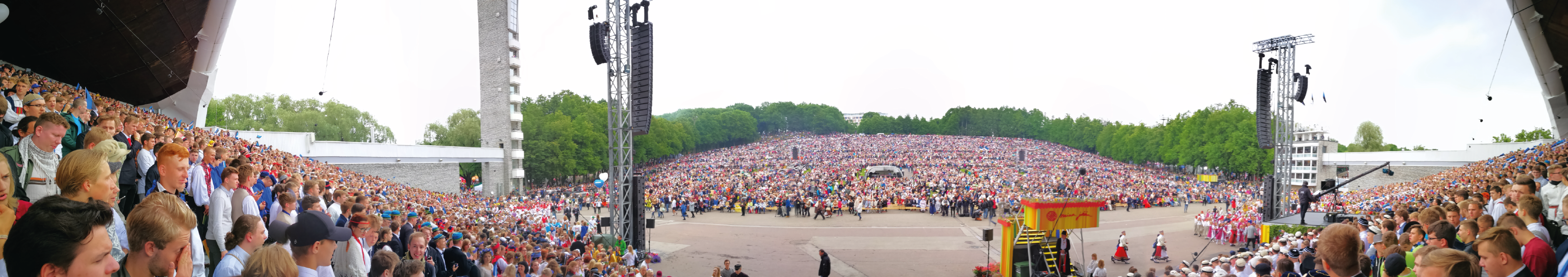
Estonian Youth Song and Dance Festival in 2017

The Estonian Youth Song and Dance Festival (Estonian: Eesti noorte laulu- ja tantsupidu) is an Estonian youth festival which takes place in Tallinn, Estonia. The festival is a mini-variant of the Estonian Song Festival and the Estonian Dance Festival. The festival is organized by the Estonian Song and Dance Celebration Foundation.

The first festival took place from 30 June to 1 July 1962.

In 2017, the XII Festival took place.
