= Veljesto =

Student society in Estonia

- Founded: 24 February 1920; 106 years ago Tartu, Estonia
- Type: Estonian Student Society
- Affiliation: Union of Student Societies
- Status: Active
- Scope: Local
- Motto: "Through true SPIRIT to BROTHERHOOD, through them both to FREEDOM!"
- Colors: none
- Chapters: 1
- Headquarters: Gildi 3-10; Tartu 51007; Estonia
- Website: www.veljesto.ee

Estonian Student Society Veljesto (EYS Veljesto or Eesti Yliõpilaste Selts Vejesto) is an association of Estonian university students. It was founded on 24 February 1920, in Tartu, Estonia.

== History ==
The Estonia Student Society Veljesto was founded on 24 February 1920 in Tartu, Estonia. Its founders were students who left the Estonian Students' Society.

Under Soviet Union occupation, the society closed on 31 July 1940. Members who escaped to Sweden reformed the society in Stockholm on 13 May 1957. Groups also formed in the United States and Toronto, Canada.

It was reformed in Estonia on 24 February 1989. It was approved as a student organization by the University of Tartu in May 1989.

== Symbols ==
Veljesto's motto is "Through true SPIRIT to BROTHERHOOD, through them both to FREEDOM!"

Veljesto is known for being the only Estonian students' association with no official colors or other symbols.

== Notable members ==
- Johannes Aavik, philologist
- August Annist, writer, folklorist, and translator
- Paul Ariste, linguist
- Tiit Hennoste, philologist and linguist
- Jaak Kangilaski, art historian
- Ott Kangilaski, artist
- Bernard Kangro, writer and poet
- Albert Kivikas, writer and journalist
- Alfred Koort, philosopher
- Janika Kronberg, literary scientist and critic
- Mart Kuldkepp, historian and Scandinavianist
- Marju Lauristin, politician and sociologist
- Harry Liivrand, art historian and diplomat
- Timo Maran, biosemiotician and poet
- Aksel Mark, politician
- Heinrich Mark, politician
- Harri Moora, archaeologist
- Julius Mägiste, linguist
- Pent Nurmekund, linguist and polyglot
- Ants Oras, translator and writer
- Lauri Pilter, writer and literary scientist
- Aare Pilv, poet and literary scholar
- Linnar Priimägi, art historian, journalist, literary critic, poet and actor
- Karl Ristikivi, writer
- Elmar Salumaa, theologian
- August Sang, poet
- Fanny de Sivers, linguist
- Ilmar Talve, writer
- Heiti Talvik, poet
- Helmut Tarand, poet, philologist, philosopher
- Mari Tarand, radio journalist
- Voldemar Vaga, art and architecture historian and teacher
- Paul Viiding, poet, author and literary critic

== See also ==
- List of fraternities and sororities in Estonia
