= Juhan Kreem =

Estonian historian, writer, and archivist (born 1971)

Juhan Kreem (born 26 June 1971) is an Estonian historian, writer, and archivist. His principal topic is Livonian Middle Ages, especially topics related to the Livonian Order.

Juhan Kreem was born in Tallinn. His father is Antarctic researcher and journalist Enn Kreem and his mother is actress Anni Kreem. His younger brother is musician Jaagup Kreem, who is a member of the rock band Terminaator. His maternal grandparents were writer Paul Viiding and translator Linda Viiding. His uncle was actor and writer Juhan Viiding, and his first cousin is poet Elo Viiding. His aunt Mari Tarand was a noted radio journalist who was married to politician, geographer and climatologist Andres Tarand, and his first cousins are politician Indrek Tarand and journalist Kaarel Tarand.

Kreem graduated from the University of Tartu in 1993 with a degree in history. He then continued his studies at the Medieval Department of the Central European University in Budapest, Hungary, where he received his master's degree. In 2002, Kreem received his doctorate in history from the University of Tartu. Since 1996, he is working at Tallinn City Archives, and since 2010, he is a senior researcher at Tallinn University.

In 2021, he was awarded with Order of the White Star, V class.
