= Kaur Alttoa =

Estonian architectural historian (born 1947)

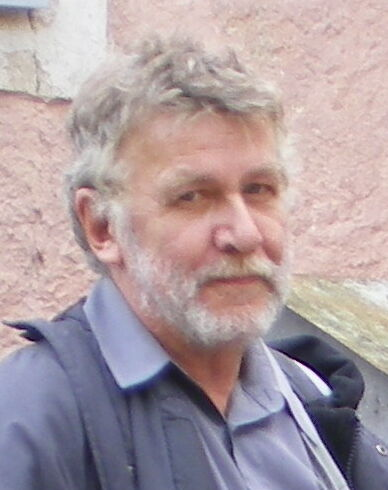
Image of Kaur Alttoa (2007)

Kaur Alttoa (born 14 September 1947, Tartu) is an Estonian art historian and cultural historian.

== Biography ==
Alttoa graduated from Hugo Treffner Gymnasium in 1966. His class teacher was Liidia Tanimäe, a legendary physics teacher during the days of the Estonian SSR. After graduating from secondary school, he attended the University of Tartu in the same year and graduated in 1972 with an art history degree, protecting his diploma paper "Vastseliina Fortress".

In October 1980, Alttoa was a signatory of the Letter of 40 Intellectuals, a public letter in which forty prominent Estonian intellectuals defended the Estonian language and protested the Russification policies of the Kremlin in Estonia. The signatories also expressed their unease against Republic-level government in harshly dealing with youth protests in Tallinn that were sparked a week earlier due to the banning of a public performance of the punk rock band Propeller.

Alttoa has mainly studied the medieval architecture of Estonia, such as forts and sacral buildings. In 1995, while working at the university, he completed his master's thesis on medieval brick buildings in southern Estonia. He has also led several archaeological excavations at Viljandi Castle, Hermann Castle, Vastseliina Castle, and elsewhere. Alttoa was a researcher at the Tartu Branch of Estonian Construction Municipalities from 1971 to 1990, and from 1975 to 1980, he was also the senior teacher of the Estonian SSR State Art Institute. He has also been the head of Anton Starkopf Museum in Tartu. Since 1977, he has been working at the University of Tartu. By the end of the 1980s, he became a lecturer in art history at the University of Tartu. From 2005 to 2007, he was the head of their Department of Art History. He was also one of the editors of the Castella Maris Baltici series publishing international bird surveys.

From 1968 to 1972, Alttoa was a member of the Tartu-based art group Visarid as a theorist and translator. In 1980, he became a signatory to the Letter of 40 intellectuals.

== Personal life ==
He is the son of literary scholar Villem Alttoa and school principal Aino Alttoa (née Liit). His wife is conservator Eve Alttoa.

== Awards ==
- 2000 – Villem Raam Award
- 2001 – 4th class of the Order of the White Star (received 23 January 2001)
- 2006 – 4th class of the Order of the Coat of National Arms (received 23 February 2006)

== Publications ==
=== Books ===
- 1990: "Villem Raami bibliograafia". Compiled by Kaur Alttoa and Eve Palginõmm. Tallinn: Eesti Muinsuskaitse Selts. 46 lk
- 1993–1999 "Eesti arhitektuur. 1–4".Üldtoimetaja Villem Raam. [Kaur Alttoa writer and compiler]. Edited by Tiit Masso. Tallinn Valgus
- 1995: "Ars Estoniae medii aevi grates Villem Raam viro doctissimo et expertissimo". [Collection of articles]. Compiled by Kaur Alttoa. Translated by Viktor Sepp, Mart Aru, and Jaan Unt. Foreword by Jaan Tamm. Tallinn: Eesti Muinsuskaitse Selts. 210 lk. ISBN 998-5601459
- 1997: Kaur Alttoa. "Saaremaa kirikud = The churches on the island of Saaremaa". Translated into English by Liina Viires. Design by Jaan Klõšeiko. Tallinn: Kunst. 80 lk. ISBN 589-9201002 (2. revised edition published in 2003, 95 lk, ISBN 589-9203188)
- 1999: Kaur Alttoa. "Estonian churches". Tallinn: Eesti Instituut. 15 lk
- 2007: "Saaremaa 2. Ajalugu. Majandus. Kultuur". Editors Kärt Jänes-Kapp, Enn Randma and Malle Soosaar. Author Kaur Alttoa design by Angelika Schneider. Tallinn: Koolibri. 1136 lk. ISBN 978-9985018828
- 2011: Kaur Alttoa. "Tartu Jaani kirik". Series "Eesti kirikud" 3rd volume. Contributors Eve Alttoa, Krista Kodres, Anu Mänd. Tallinn: Muinsuskaitseamet, 2011. 135 lk. ISBN 978-9985989647
- 2015: "Viljandi ordulinnus ja Lossimäed läbi aja = The Teutonic Order's castle and castle hills in Viljandi through time". Viljandi Muuseumi Toimetised V volume. Editors Ain-Andris Vislapuu. Authors Heiki Valk, Arvi Haak, Juhan Kreem, Kaur Alttoa and Ain-Andris Vislapuu. English translation by Juta Ristsoo, Heiki Valk and Arvi Haak. Designed by Kristjan Mändmaa. Viljandi: Viljandi Muuseum. 183 lk. ISBN 978-9949928637
- 2015: Kaur Alttoa. "101 Eesti pühakoda". Edited by Eha Kõrge. Designed by Mari Kaljuste. Fotograaf Kaur Alttoa. Tallinn: Varrak. 214 lk. (sari "101 Eesti ...") ISBN 978-9985335314
- 2017: Kaur Alttoa. "Tartu. Piiskopi- ja hansalinnast Emajõe Ateenaks. Kirjutisi Tartu vanemast ehitusloost". Toimetanud Urmas Tõnisson. Designed by Mari Ainso. Tartu: Ilmamaa. 375 lk. (sari "Ilmatargad") ISBN 978-9985776049
- 2018: "Tartu toomkirik. Katedraal. Raamatukogu. Muuseum". Designed by Mariann Raisma and Krista Andreson. Authors Kaur Alttoa, Malle Ermel, Lea Leppik, Madis Maasing, Juhan Maiste, Martin Malve, Mihkel Mäesalu, Anu Ormisson-Lahe and Heiki Valk. Translated by Juta Ristsoo. Publisher: Tartu Ülikooli muuseum. 336 lk. ISBN 978-9985410929

=== Manuscripts ===
- 1969: "Eesti kunsti üldnäitused 1906–1918". Auhinnatöö. Tartu: Tartu Riiklik Ülikool. 122 lk
- 1972: "Vastseliina linnus". Thesis. Tartu: Tartu Riiklik Ülikool
- 1995: "Lõuna-Eesti arhitektuur 15. saj.–16. saj. I poolel". Magistritöö. Tartu: Tartu Ülikool. 206 lk

== Works about Alttoa ==
- 1996 - Kersti Markus. "Alttoa, Kaur". // Eesti kunsti ja arhitektuuri biograafiline leksikon. Eesti Entsüklopeediakirjastus. Tallinn 1996. Lk 574
- 2000 - Rein Loodus. "Alttoa, Kaur". // Eesti teaduse biograafiline leksikon. I kd, A - Ki. Tallinn 2000. Lk 63
- 2000 - "Alttoa, Kaur". // Eesti entsüklopeedia. 14. kd (Eesti elulood). Eesti Entsüklopeediakirjastus. Tallinn 2000. Lk 18
