= Kilvet =

Kilvet is a surname. Notable people with this surname include:

- Kaarel Kilvet (1944–2005), Estonian actor, singer and director
- Krista Kilvet (1946–2009), Estonian radio journalist, politician and diplomat
