= Villu Jürjo =

Estonian Lutheran cleric (1950–2024)

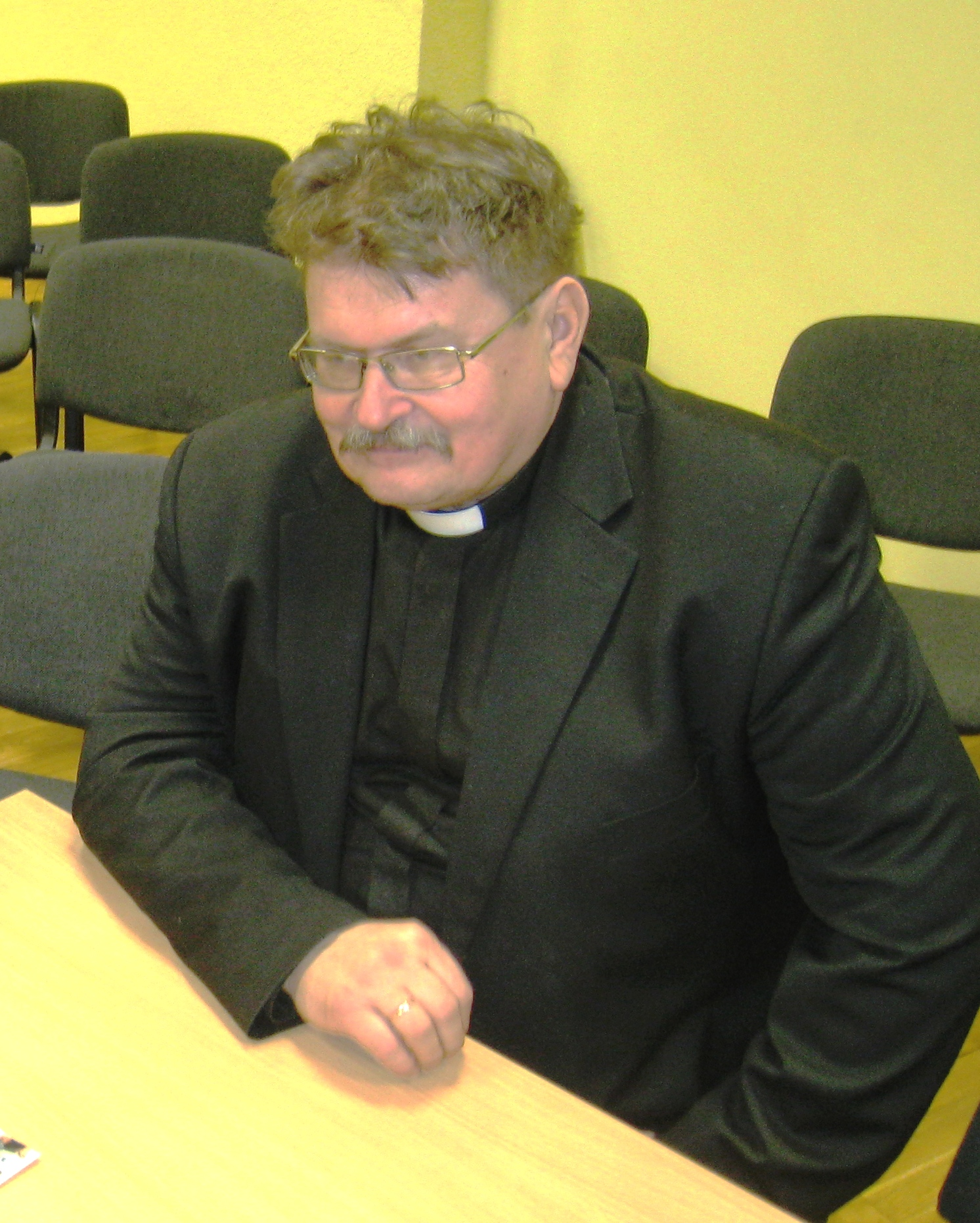
Jürjo in 2013

Villu Jürjo (12 November 1950 – 1 August 2024) was an Estonian Lutheran cleric who was most notable for voting for the Estonian restoration of Independence.

== Biography ==
Jürjo graduated from the Institute of Theology of the Estonian Evangelical Lutheran Church in 1975 and was ordained on 5 October 1975. From 1971 to 1975, he was a practitioner of the church practice at the Saarde Congregation with Elmar Salumaa.

Jürjo has worked as a chaplain in multiple parishes; He worked in the parishes of Häädemeeste and Treimani from 1975 to 1978, and from 1978 to 1980 in Võru. He was the chaplain in Pindi from 1980 to 1982. He was later a pastor in Pechory from 1982 to 1984, and in Urvaste from 1984 to 1994. From 1990 to 1991, he was also a member of the Supreme Soviet of the Estonian SSR. There, he voted for the Estonian restoration of Independence. He was also a member of the Supreme Council of the Republic of Estonia from 1991 to 1992, an assessor at the EELC Consistory from 1990 to 1994, and, from 1991 to 1995, a member of the Võru Brethren. From 1994 to 2000, he was a teacher at Mary's Church in Tartu, where he participated in the restoration of Tartu Maarja Congregation House.

From 1 July 2000 to 4 November 2014, Jürjo was a chaplain at the Narva Alexandri parish. He was the Ambassador of the Synod of the Viru Prophet of the agency, as well as the Ambassador of the EELK Council. He was also the chairman of the board of the Narva Alexandri Church and organized the construction of Alexander's Cathedral in Narva. On 21 July 2000, the article "The Church Teacher exchanged both a woman and a church" was published in Õhtuleht, where ex-wife Audrone describes the breakdown of their marriage and how his wife was left alone with 5 children.

Jürjo had participated in the restoration of the Kraavi Church.

Jürjo was a member of Pro Patria Union, but left it because, in his own words, "the then prime minister, Mart Laar, did not return the Church of Mary in Tartu". He was a member of the Centre Party.

In 1990, Jürjo's pastor, Harald Meri, disappeared and was found dead under mysterious circumstances.

Together with Sirje Simson, he wrote the book "Viru praostkonna kirikud"" (Logos, 2003). He also translated the Michel Quoist book "Prayers on the Cross" (Logos, 1993).

On 23 October 2013, the article "Is Narva Congregation Under the Hammer?", published in the Estonian Church, says that Viru County Court fined the Viru County Congregation €530,000 on 9 October in favor of the construction company Eviko. The article also mentioned Jürjo. A week later, Jürjo sued the Press Club of the Estonian Church, arguing that it was an article about him. Jürjo estimated that the article contained unproven facts. The Estonian Church replied that the article was based on a story that appeared on Põhjarannik, to which additional comments were requested. The Estonian Church added that Jürjo was also able to explain in a separate article the borrowing of a loan. On 19 December 2013, the Press Council decided that the Estonian Church had not violated the code of ethics for journalism. According to the press council, the complainant received a sufficient amount of words on the same page.

In March 2014, the EELC Consortium suspended the performance of the duties of Jürjo in the Narva church until the end of 2014, following the internal audit carried out at the EELC Narva Congregation, pursuant to § 89 (1) of the Church Code.

On 4 June 2014, Eesti Ekspress published an article titled "Pastor Jürjo, who had ruined the church in Narva: I do not know why I signed it", described the activities of Jürjo, which could have led to the bankruptcy of the EELC Narva's Alexander's Church.

On 3 November 2014, Jürjo dispatched his superiors, Viru's Peeter Kaldur, in the face of Jürjo's controversy. On the following day, the EELC Church Council decided to send Jürjo to retire in January 2015. The same evening Jürjo himself wrote a statement asking himself to be freed from the office of the Alexander congregation since 4 November. On 23 November, the council of the parish council decided to liquidate the church congregation and start bankruptcy proceedings. It was decided to sell the real estate of the congregation to the full extent of the €1.3 million debt incurred during Jürjo's term.

Jürjo died on 1 August 2024, at the age of 73.

== Awards ==
- 4th Class of the Order of the National Coat of Arms (received 23 February 2002)
- 3rd Class of the Order of the National Coat of Arms (received 23 February 2006)
- Territory Altar III Class Order

== Bibliography ==
- Villu Jürjo "Eesti Töörahwa Kommuna terror Narvas 29.11.1918 – 18.01.1919" Kultuur ja Elu
- Villu Jürjo "Salumaa sajand" Eesti Kirik, 18. märts 2008
