= Kangilaski =

Kangilaski is an Estonian surname. Notable people with the surname include:

- Jaak Kangilaski (1939–2022), Estonian art historian
- Ott Kangilaski (1911–1975), Estonian printmaker, cartoonist, and journalist
