= Indrek Tarand =

Estonian politician (born 1964)

Indrek Tarand MEP
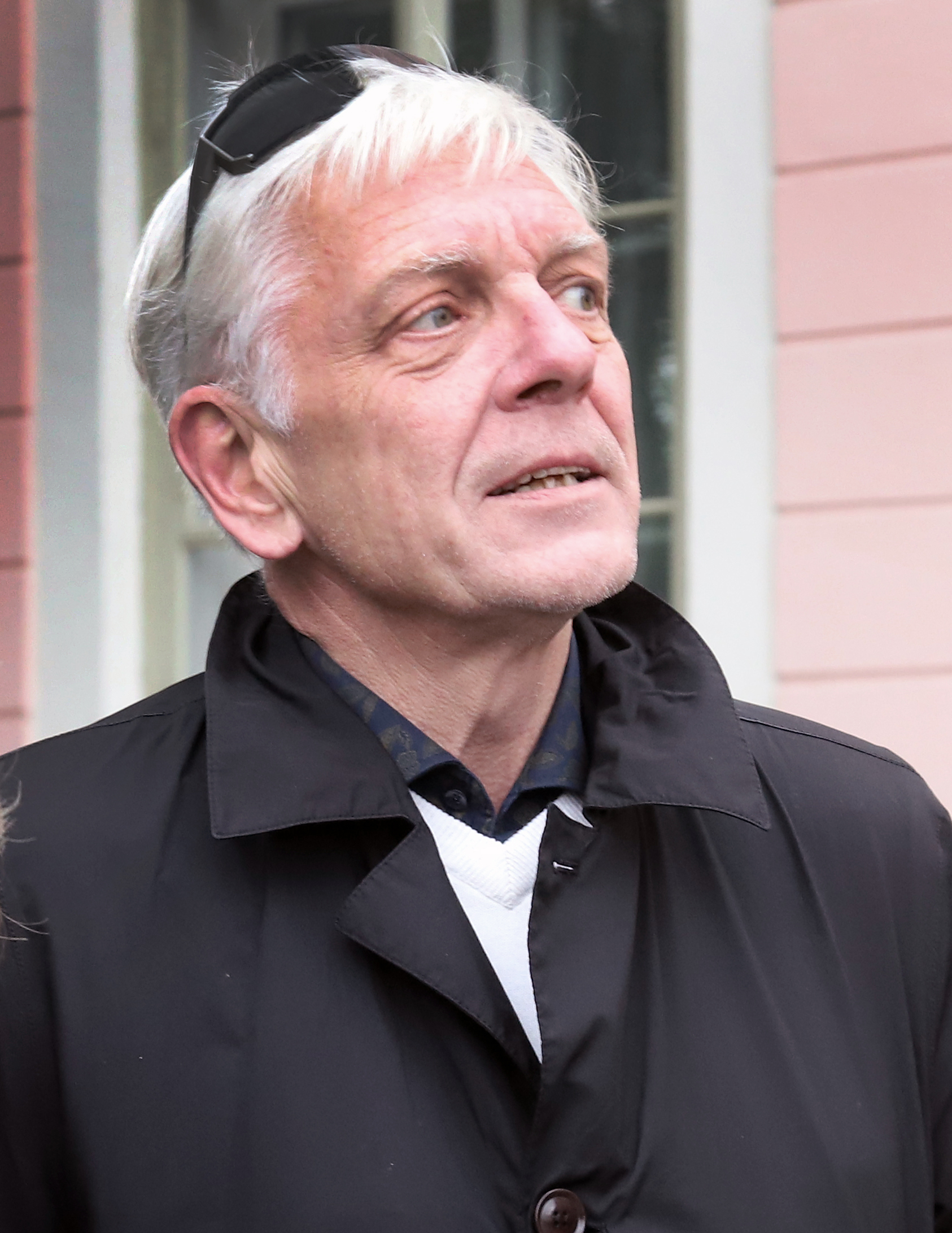
- Tarand in 2024

Member of the European Parliament
- In office 1 July 2009 – 30 June 2019
- Constituency: Estonia

Personal details
- Born: 3 February 1964 (age 62) Tallinn, then part of Estonian SSR, Soviet Union
- Party: Estonian; Independent; EU; European Green Party
- Spouse: Kadi Tarand
- Children: 3
- Education: University of Tartu; SAIS Bologna, Johns Hopkins University

Indrek Tarand (born 3 February 1964) is an Estonian politician and a former Member of the European Parliament (MEP) from Estonia. He was an independent politician, but a member of the European Green Party.

Tarand has served as an advisor to the Prime Minister of Estonia and as the Secretary General of the Estonian Ministry of Foreign Affairs.

== Biography ==
Tarand is the eldest son of politician Andres Tarand. His mother Mari Tarand, was a well-known linguist and radio journalist and the elder sister of Juhan Viiding. His younger brother is journalist Kaarel Tarand. His paternal grandfather was Estonian cultural figure, philologist and poet Helmut Tarand. His maternal grandparents were poet, author and literary critic Paul Viiding and translator Linda Viiding. His first cousins include historian Juhan Kreem, musician Jaagup Kreem, and poet Elo Viiding.

He studied history at the University of Tartu, as well as the University of Bologna, Italy. As a student during the Soviet occupation, he was expelled in his first year for lighting candles with his fellow Estonian patriots on the grave of Julius Kuperjanov, an Estonian military commander. Tarand was forced to the Soviet military service and after that he finished the university in 1991.

In 2005, Tarand caused a scandal at a soccer game by wearing a shirt that bore the names of some former Communist Party members, including Estonian president Arnold Rüütel and Prime Minister Andrus Ansip with the words Kommarid ahju! ("Commies to the oven!") This was one of the reasons that caused defense minister Jaak Jõerüüt to resign.

In 2006, Tarand participated as a celebrity contestant on the first season of Tantsud tähtedega, an Estonian version of Dancing with the Stars. His professional dancing partner was Kaisa Oja.

He is also a freelance journalist hosting programmes in radio and television, including the Estonian version of Are You Smarter Than a 5th Grader?.

He also held the post of the Director of the Estonian War Museum – General Laidoner Museum. However, shortly after taking the MEP seat, Tarand relinquished his directorship. As a reserve officer, Tarand holds the rank of second lieutenant (nooremleitnant).

In 2011, Tarand ran in the indirect presidential election of Estonia against Toomas Hendrik Ilves. His candidacy was supported by the Centre Party, while the other three parliamentary parties backed Ilves. Tarand received 25 votes in the Riigikogu against Ilves's 73.

== European Parliament ==
For the elections for the European Parliament (EP) in June 2009 he stood as an independent candidate and received 102.460 votes (25.81%) in Estonia, which placed him on a surprising second rank after the Estonian Centre Party (KE, Eesti Keskerakond) with 103.506 votes (26.07%). He joined the political group of the Greens/European Free Alliance (Greens/ALE). During this legislature 2009-2014 he became member (either as full member or as substitute member) of the following committees and delegations:

- 2009-2014 Committee on Constitutional Affairs (AFCO),
- 2009-2014 Committee on Foreign Affairs (AFET),
- 2009-2014 Subcommittee on Security and Defence (SEDE),
- 2009-2014 Delegation for relations with Israel (D-IL),
- 2009-2014 Delegation for relations with Switzerland and Norway and to the EU-Iceland Joint Parliamentary Committee and the European Economic Area (EEA) Joint Parliamentary Committee (DEEA),
- 2009-2014 Delegation for relations with the NATO Parliamentary Assembly (DNAT).

In the 65 speeches of his first legislature (2009-2014), he was mostly covering issues linked to European External Action Service, United Nations, WTO, international treaties and conventions, human rights, refugees, arms trade, neighbourhood policy, Russia, Ukraine, Belarus, Southern Caucasus, Kyrgyzstan, Israel, Syria, South Sudan, Mali, US and NSA surveillance programme, Arctic, Iceland, Italy, Swiss quota, EU budget, climate, energy security and strategy for Europe, IT, Single Seat for the EP, European Citizens’ Initiative.

He was rapporteur of the following report and opinion:

- October 2012 (AFET) “Report on the role of the Common Security and Defence Policy in case of climate-driven crises and natural disasters” (A7-0349/2012),
- March 2014 (AFET) “Opinion on the proposal for a Council decision on the conclusion of the Doha Amendment to the Kyoto Protocol to the United Nations Framework Convention on Climate Change and the joint fulfilment of commitments thereunder” (AFET_AD(2014)527952).

He was as well shadow rapporteur of the following reports and opinions:

- October 2009 (AFCO) “Report on the institutional aspects of setting up the European External Action Service” (A7-0041/2009),
- December 2010 (AFET) “Report on a sustainable EU policy for the High North” (A7-0377/2010),
- October 2012 (AFET) “Report on Cyber Security and Defence” (A7-0335/2012),
- November 2012 (AFET) “Report on a Digital Freedom Strategy in EU Foreign Policy” (A7-0374/2012).

In 2010, together with the other MEPs Guy Verhofstadt, Daniel Cohn-Bendit, Sylvie Goulard and Isabelle Durant, Andrew Duff and Jo Leinen, he became member of the Spinelli Group, in order to inject a federalist momentum into the political decisions and policies of the EU. The aim is to be a network of citizens, politicians, academics and writers who are convinced it is time for Europe to move forward.
His surprising success in 2009 tempted fifteen other individuals to follow his example and to stand as independent candidate for the elections for the European Parliament in May 2014. Indrek Tarand stood again as an independent candidate, got more votes than all the other independent candidates together and was with 43.369 votes (13.2%) reelected. http://ep2014.vvk.ee/voting-results-en.html He stayed member of the political group of the Greens/European Free Alliance. For his second legislature he became member (either as full member or as substitute member) of the following committees and delegations:

- Committee on Budgets (BUDG),
- Committee on Industry, Research and Energy (ITRE),
- Subcommittee on Security and Defence (SEDE),
- Delegation for relations with the countries of the Andean Community (DAND),
- Delegation to the Euro-Latin American Parliamentary Assembly (DLAT).

He was rapporteur of the following opinions:

- January 2015 (BUDG) “Opinion on the 2013 annual report from the High Representative of the European Union for Foreign Affairs and Security Policy to the European Parliament” (BUDG_AD(2015)544127),
- January 2015 (BUDG) “Opinion on (…) a Sustainable Fisheries Partnership Agreement between the European Union and the Republic of Senegal” (...) (BUDG_AD(2015)541661).

He was as well shadow rapporteur of the following reports and opinions:

- October 2014 (BUDG) “Report on the Council position on the draft general budget of the European Union for the financial year 2015” (A8-0014/2014),
- November 2014 (ITRE) “Recommendation on the draft Council decision on the conclusion of the Cooperation Agreement on a Civil Global Navigation Satellite System (GNSS) between the European Community and its Member States and the Kingdom of Morocco” (A8-0045/2014),
- January 2015 (AFET) “Opinion on the proposal for a regulation of the European Parliament and of the Council amending Regulation (EU, EURATOM) No 966/2012 on the financial rules applicable to the general budget of the Union” (AFET_AD(2015)541620).

For his first 16 speeches in the ongoing legislature 2014–2019, he focused on issues as EU budget, Horizon 2020, new Commission President, EU Summit, Paris climate agreement, anti-terrorism measures, EU Internal Security Strategy, situation in Ukraine and state of play of EU-Russia relations, closing down of Memorial (Sakharov Prize 2009) in Russia, human rights in Uzbekistan, situation in Libya, humanitarian situation in South Sudan.
