= Mõmmi ja aabits =

Estonian television series

Mõmmi ja aabits (English: Teddy Bear and the Alphabet Book) is an Estonian children's television series, where a little bear cub learns letters from a primer. The children's show is based on Heljo Mänd's story "Karu aabits" (1971). The program was broadcast on Eesti Televisioon (ETV) from 1973 until 1976. The director of the series was Kaarel Kilvet, the co-director was Tiiu Vahi, the artist was Gunta Randla, and the music was composed by Tõnis Kõrvits.

== History ==
The first broadcast went live on 18 March 1973, and was in black and white. By 1976, 17 episodes were made. These shows have not survived on tape. Another version was recorded in color in 1977–1978, which is also the most well-known. At the end of the 1970s, another seven-part series was made, where Mõmmi already attends school, but these parts have not been preserved either.

In the years 1998–1999, Karin Nurm and Maarika Lauri staged the new stories Mõmmi ja aabits. 20 aastat hiljem (English: Teddy Bear and the Alphabet Book. 20 Years Later) on ETV. The artist of the production was Gunta Randla, the author of the music was Tõnis Kõrvits and the author of the lyrics was Heljo Mänd.

The director of the bear story, Kaarel Kilvet, has also emphasized the social importance of the show, because the family of bears is a good example for children, from whom they can learn to care for each other.

== Cast (1977–1978) ==
- Mõmmi – Ivo Eensalu, a bear
- Karu-Kati – Ene Janson, a bear
- Karu-Mati – Vello Janson, a bear
- Mõmmi's mother – Katrin Karisma, a bear
- Mõmmi father – Tõnis Rätsep, a bear
- Jänku-Juta – Maria Klenskaja, a bunny
- Rebase-Rein – Lembit Ulfsak, a fox
- Hundikutsikas Uudu – Tõnu Saar, a wolf cub
- Hundikutsikas Uugu – Kalev Tammin, a wolf cub
- Orava-Olga – Marje Metsur, a squirrel

== Home media ==
- "Mõmmi ja aabits". Parts 1–8; 1977 recording. Eesti Televisioon (ETV), 2005.
- "Mõmmi ja aabits". Parts 9–16; 1977 recording. Eesti Televisioon (ETV), 2005.
- "Mõmmi ja aabits". 20 years later. 1998 recording. Eesti Rahvusringhääling (ERR), 2008. Learn the letters A, I, L, E, P, B, V, U, J, T and D.
- "Mõmmi ja aabits". 20 years later. 1999 recording. Eesti Rahvusringhääling (ERR), 2008. Learn the letters M, N, O, G, K, H, Ü, Ä, S, R, Õ and Ö.
