= Aare Laht =

Estonian chemist

Aare Laht (born 6 June 1948) is an Estonian chemist.

He has worked at National Institute of Chemical Physics and Biophysics

In 1980, he was among the signatories of the Letter of 40 intellectuals.

In 2006, he was awarded with Order of the National Coat of Arms, IV class.
