= Ivo Eensalu =

Estonian actor and musician (born 1949)

- Born: 3 April 1949 (age 77); Märjamaa, then part of Estonian SSR, Soviet Union
- Occupations: Actor, theatre director
- Years active: 1972–present
- Spouse: Marika Eensalu (m. 1971)

Ivo Eensalu (born 3 April 1949) is an Estonian actor and theatre director. Eensalu's career began in the early 1970s, and has appeared as an actor on stage, film and in television. He became widely known after appearing on the Eesti Televisioon children's educational television series Mõmmi ja aabits. From 1995 until 2001, he was the director of the Estonian Drama Theatre.

== Early life and education ==
Ivo Eensalu was born in Märjamaa in 1949. His father was a carpenter. He graduated from Järvakandi Secondary School in 1967 and enrolled in the Performing Arts Department of the Tallinn State Conservatory (now, the Estonian Academy of Music and Theatre) the following year, studying drama with instructor Voldemar Panso, and graduating in 1972. His diploma production role was that of Eero in Aleksis Kivi's The Seven Brothers, directed by Panso and performed at the Estonian Drama Theatre in Tallinn. Among his graduating classmates were actors Helgi Annast, Vello Janson, Rein Kotkas, Kersti Kreismann, Siim Rulli, Tõnis Rätsep, Tõnu Saar, Jaak Tamleht, Martin Veinmann, and Juhan Viiding.

== Career ==
=== Theatre ===
Eensalu began an engagement the Estonian SSR State Youth Theatre (now, the NUKU Theatre) in Tallinn in 1972, where he would remain until 1977. Notable roles at the Estonian SSR State Youth Theatre include Karlsson and Rulle in Astrid Lindgren's Karlsson-on-the-Roof, Shurik in Vasily Zhukovsky's Orpheus, Tom Sawyer in Mark Twain's The Adventures of Tom Sawyer, and Detective Blore in Agatha Christie's And Then There Were None.

In 1977, Eensalu accepted an engagement as an actor and director at the Estonian Drama Theatre in Tallinn, and in 1995, he became the theatre's principal director. He retired his position in 2001 and has been a freelance actor and director since; most notably, as a director of a number of productions at Old Baskin's Theatre, as well as Tallinn Town Hall and the Salme Cultural Center in Tallinn and the Rakvere Theatre. He has also directed productions in theatres in Finland.

=== Television ===
In 1972, Eensalu was cast in the role of Mõmmi in the Eesti Televisioon (ETV) children's educational series Mõmmi ja aabits, based on writer Heljo Mänd's 1971 short story Karu aabits. The series aired on 18 March 1973 and became extremely popular and ran, with breaks, until 1978. A sequel series, Mõmmi ja aabits. 20 aastat hiljem, was created in 1998 and ran until 1999, in which Eensalu played the role of Father Bear Madis. In 2011, 2017, 2019, and 2022, Eensalu appeared in and directed stage productions derived from Mõmmi ja aabits at several venues throughout Estonia. In 1998, the kindergarten in the village of Imavere in Järva County was renamed Mõmmi Kindergarten in honour of the series; in 2008, the corresponding order was read out by Eensalu in character as Mõmmi at an event dedicated to the tenth anniversary of the kindergarten.

Another popular ETV children's series, Vandersellid, aired from 1982 until 1983, in which Eensalu played the role of Ivo opposite actors Paul Poom and Guido Kangur. From 1984 until 1987, he appeared as Sass Suhkur in the Virve Koppel directed ETV children's series Pailapsiin opposite Tallinn Conservatory classmate and fellow Mõmmi ja aabits actor Tõnu Saar.

In 1980, Eensalu had a prominent role in the Elvi Koppel directed children's television film Kardemoni linna rahvas ja röövlid, based on the 1955 book When the Robbers Came to Cardamom Town by Norwegian writer Thorbjørn Egner. In 1982, Eensalu appeared in the ETV television musical comedy film Teisikud, directed by Leo Karpin. Other television roles include the 1987 four-part Olav Neuland directed ETV television film Näkimadalad, the 1997 TV3 television series Waba Riik , and the 2015 Andres Puustusmaa directed ETV drama series Mustad lesed. In 2011, he had a recurring role as the character Manfred Aavakivi in the Raivo Maripuu directed Kanal 2 crime series Kelgukoerad. In 2018, he appeared as the character Sass Tabi in two episodes of the TV3 comedy-crime series Kättemaksukontor.

Eensalu has also directed a number of teleplays for the Estonian Drama Theatre that aired on ETV, beginning with a 1983 production of Simo "Aapeli" Puupponen's The Whole City of Vinski. Other teleplays directed by Eensalu include works by Evgeny Schwartz, Ekaterina Borisova, Janno Põldma, Arthur Omre, Astrid Lindgren, and Ene-Maris Tali.

=== Film ===
Eensalu made his feature film screen debut in the role of Vikerkaar in the 1974 Virve Aruoja and Jaan Tooming directed drama Värvilised unenäod. The following year, he had a more substantial role as Sikk in the Mikk Mikiver directed Tallinnfilm historical drama Indrek, based on the second volume of A. H. Tammsaare's pentalogy Tõde ja õigus.

During the 1980s, he established himself as a character actor. In 1982, he appeared in the Peeter Simm directed Tallinnfilm adventure film Arabella, mereröövli tütar, based on the story of the same name by children's writer Aino Pervik. In 1984, he appeared as a village idiot in the Olav Neuland directed historical adventure film Hundiseaduse aegu.

In 1992, he appeared in the Lembit Ulfsak directed comedy-family film Lammas all paremas nurgas, and the following year appeared as Ivo in the Kaljo Kiisk directed Tallinnfilm drama Suflöör, the Marek Piestrak directed Estonian-Polish-Russian historical supernatural thriller Saatana pisar, and in the Pekka Karjalainen directed Finnish-Estonian comedy Hysteria. In 1994, he played the role of a Siberian guard in the Jaan Kolberg directed period adventure film Jüri Rumm, based on the life of 19th-century itinerant thief and robber Rummu Jüri. In 1995, he appeared as a voice actor in the role of Alderman in the Heiki Ernits and Leo Lätti directed animated film Tallinna legendid.

Eensalu has been a member of the Estonian Theatre Association since 1973, the Directors' Association since 1992, and the Actors' Union since 1993.

== Personal life ==
In 1971, Eensalu married opera singer Marika Eensalu. He is an avid cook and fisherman.

== Acknowledgements ==
- Fr. R. Kreutzwald Museum Medal of Commemoration (1995)
- Salme Reek Award (1997)
