= Aavo Sirk =

Estonian physicist

Aavo Sirk (born in 1945) is an Estonian physicist.

He has worked at National Institute of Chemical Physics and Biophysics.

He gave his signature to Letter of 40 intellectuals.

In 2006, he was awarded with Order of the National Coat of Arms, IV class.
