= Verilaske =

Village in Estonia

- Village
- Location within Estonia
- Coordinates: 58.3625°N 25.686111111111°E
- Country: Estonia
- County: Viljandi County
- Parish: Viljandi Parish
- Time zone: UTC+2 (EET)
  - Summer (DST): UTC+3 (EEST)

Verilaske is a village in Viljandi Parish, Viljandi County in Estonia. It was a part of Viiratsi Parish before 2013.

== Notable people ==
Notable people that were born in Verilaske include the following:

- Ott Kangilaski (1911–1975), printmaker, cartoonist, and journalist
