= Aare Pilv =

Estonian poet and literary scholar

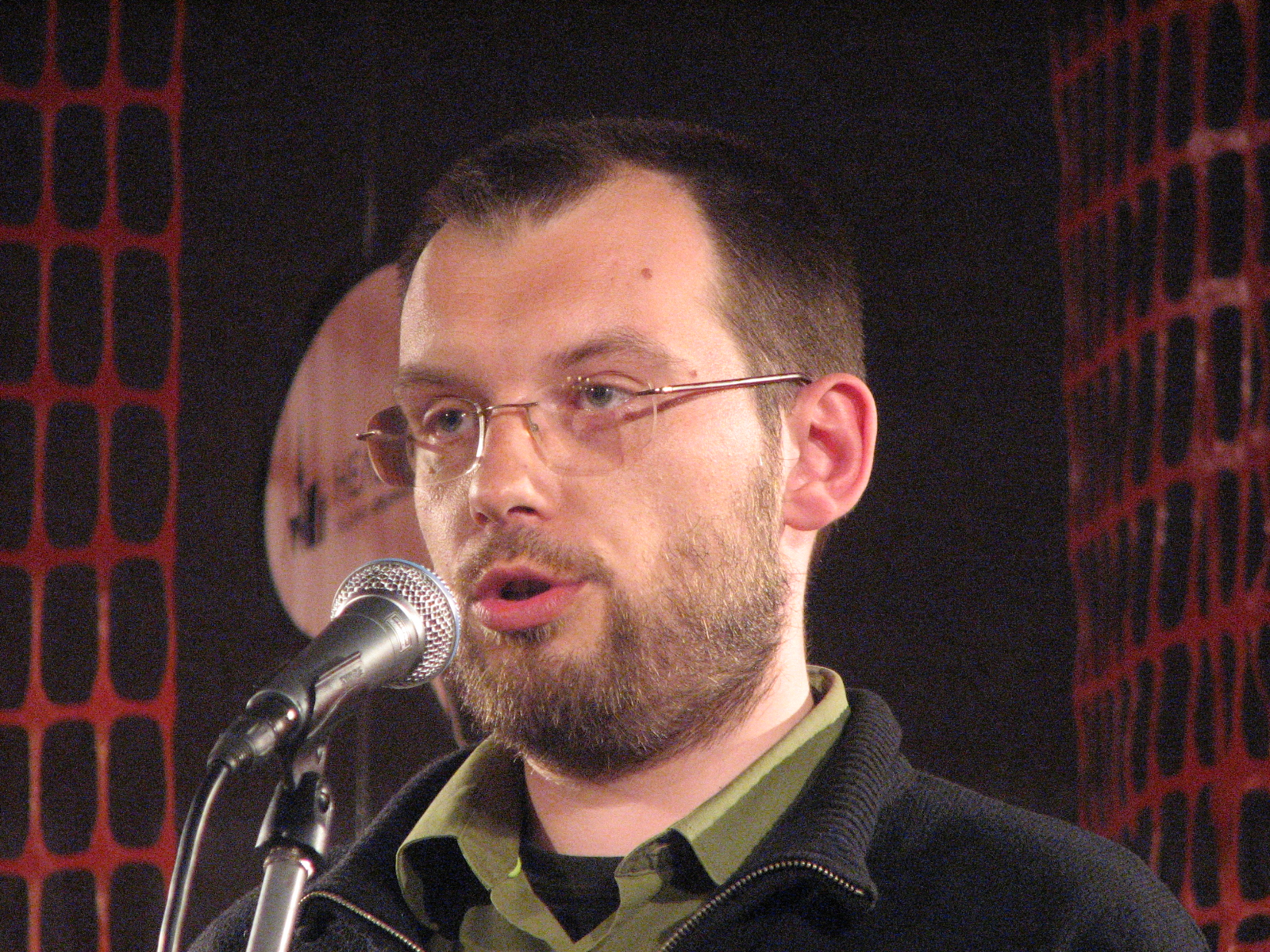
Aare Pilv (2011)

Aare Pilv (born 15 April 1976) is an Estonian poet, literary scholar, translator and critic.

Pilv as born in Viljandi. He is working as a researcher at Under and Tuglas Literature Centre of the Estonian Academy of Sciences.

He is a member of the poetry group Erakkond ('The Group of Hermits'). He is also a member of Estonian Writers' Union and student society Veljesto.

== Works ==
- 1996: poetry collection "Üle"
- 1998: poetry collection "Päike ehk päike" ('Sun or Sun')
- 1999: poetry collection "Tema nimi on kohus" ('Their Name is Duty')
- 2002: poetry collection "Nägemist" ('Goodbye')
- 2007. "Näoline" (poetry and prose)
- 2010: travelogue "Ramadaan"
- 2017: poetry collection "Kui vihm saab läbi" ('When the Rain is Over')
