= Marje Metsur =

Estonian actress

Marje Metsur (née Marje Mihhailova; born 27 June 1941) is an Estonian actress.

In 1965, she graduated from Tallinn State Conservatory Stage Art Department. In 1965-2009, she worked at Tallinn City Theatre. Since 2009, she is a freelance actress.

Her most notable theatrical role (Mati Unt's play "Rästiku pihtimus") was in 1979 in Noorsooteater. Besides theatrical roles she has also played on several films.

In 2006, she was awarded with Order of the White Star, IV class.

She has been married to Estonian athlete and educator Kaupo Metsur since 1967.

== Filmography ==
- 1966 Kirjad Sõgedate külast (role: Secretary)
- 1971: Metskapten
- 1977 Mõmmi ja aabits (role: Orava-Olga)
- 1977 Karikakramäng (role: Leida)
- 1987 Metsluiged (role: Witch)
- 1992 Armastuse lahinguväljad (role: Mother)
- 1993– Õnne 13 (role: Leili Kerges)
- 2005 Libahundi needus (role: Poetess)
- 2007 Klass (role: Estonian language teacher)
- 2008 Taarka (role: Old Taarka)
- 2010 ENSV (role: Marta)
- 2016 Naabriplika (role: Krista's mother)
- 2019 Johannes Pääsukese tõeline elu (role: Hostess of Tsängu)
- 2020 FRESH BLOOD: With the Best Intentions (Narrator (segment "Virago")
