= Kersti Kreismann =

Estonian actress (born 1947)

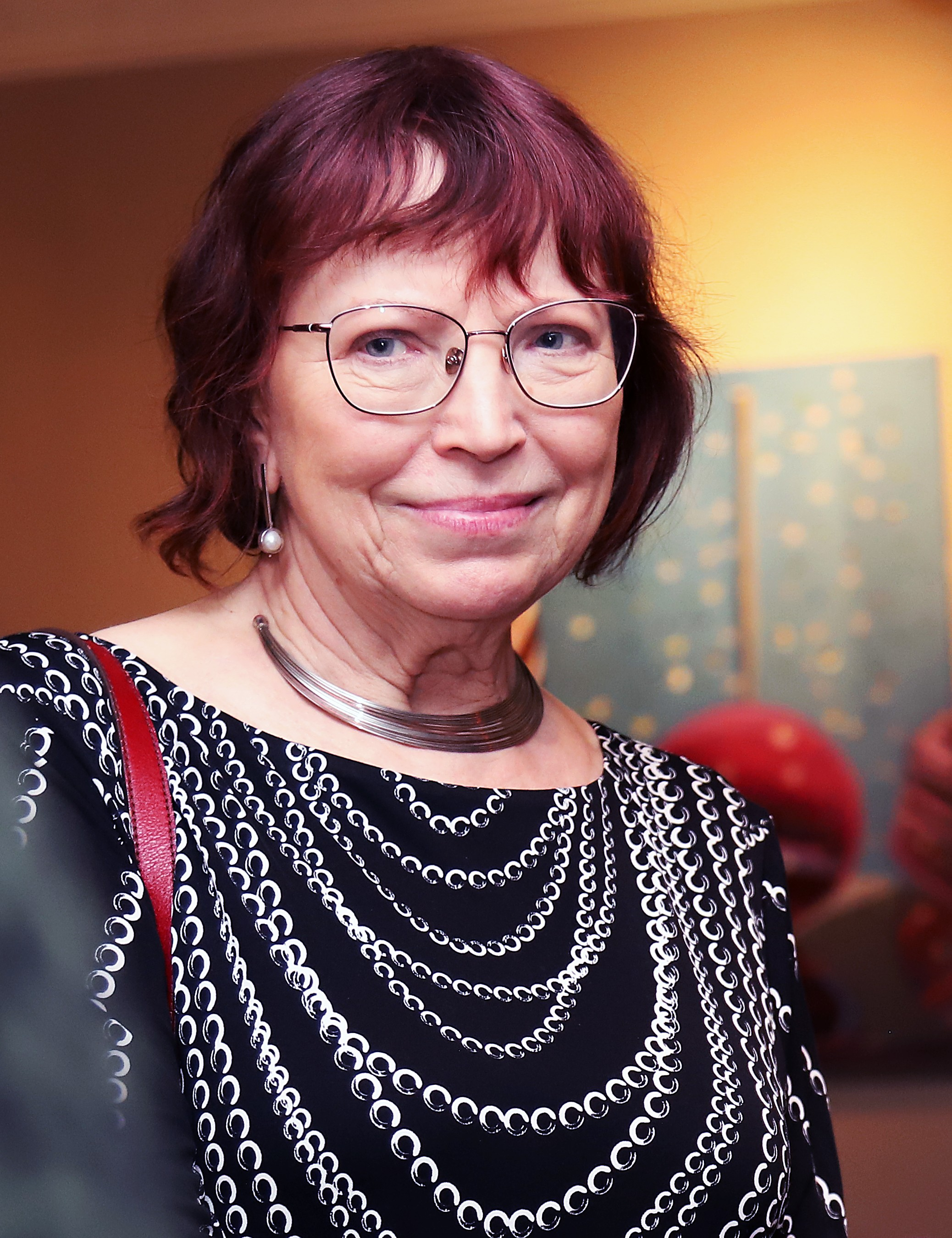
- Kreismann in 2023
- Born: 25 January 1947 (age 79); Tali, then part of Estonian SSR, Soviet Union
- Occupation: Actress
- Children: Andres Raag

Kersti Kreismann (born 25 January 1947) is an Estonian actress.

Kreissmann graduated from Kilingi-Nõmme High School in 1965. From 1965 to 1968, she studied Estonian philology at University of Tartu. In 1972, she graduated from the Tallinn Conservatory (now, the Estonian Academy of Music and Theatre), studying acting under instruction of actor and theatre pedagogue Voldemar Panso. Among her graduating classmates were Tõnis Rätsep, Ivo Eensalu, Vello Janson, Rein Kotkas, Helle Meri (née Pihlak), Katrin Kumpan, Martin Veinmann, and Juhan Viiding. Afterward, she began an engagement as an actress at the Estonian Drama Theatre. Kreismann has played in radio drama, television broadcasting and TV series (Laxons 1993-1995, M Club 1996-1998, Home in the Middle of the City from 2003). She has also acted in films (for example, Christmas in Vigala in 1980).

In October 1980, Kreismann was a signatory of the Letter of 40 Intellectuals, a public letter in which forty prominent Estonian intellectuals defended the Estonian language and protested the Russification policies of the Kremlin in Estonia. The signatories also expressed their unease against Republic-level government in harshly dealing with youth protests in Tallinn that were sparked a week earlier due to the banning of a public performance of the punk rock band Propeller.

== Personal life ==
Kreismann is the mother of actor Andres Raag.
