= Marika Eensalu =

Estonian opera singer (born 1947)

Marika Eensalu (until 1971 Marika Bahvalova; born 20 September 1947) is an Estonian opera singer (mezzo-soprano) and music pedagogue.

== Biography ==
Eensalu was born in Tallinn and attended schools in Peri before enrolling at the Tallinn University of Technology. After graduation, she worked at the AS Kommunaalprojekt construction design company. She sang in the Estonian girls' choir Ellerhein, and later with the Aare Rüütel Orchestra and studied singing at the Estonian SSR State Philharmonic. In 1973, she graduated from Ludmilla Issakova's class of classical singing at the Tallinn Music School. In 1978, she graduated from the Tallinn State Conservatory.

From 1970 to 1980, she sang with the Estonia Theatre's choir. From 1980 until 1997, she was an Estonia Theatre soloist.

From 1988 to 1990, she taught at the Tallinn State Conservatory. Since 1990, she has taught at Georg Ots Tallinn Music College. Her notable students have included Kädy Plaas and Maria Veretenina.

== Personal life ==
Eensalu's is married to actor and theatre director Ivo Eensalu.

== Awards ==
- 1986: Merited Artist of Estonian SSR
- 1989: Georg Ots' prize

== Roles ==
- La Frugola – Giacomo Puccini's "Il tabarro"
- Catharina – Eduard Tubinİ's "Reigi õpetaja"
- Marfa – Modest Mussorgsky's "Khovanshchina"
