= Helmut Tarand =

Estonian poet, philologist, philosopher

Helmut(h) Tarand (until 1935; Helmuth Takenberg; 8 October 1911 – 1 November 1987) was an Estonian poet, philologist, philosopher and cultural figure. He used also pseudonyms Annus Rävälä and Aili Helm (with Hilja Rüütli).

From 1929 to 1936 he attended Tartu University, studying philosophy.

He was a member of student society Veljesto.

In 1945 he was arrested because of his anti-Soviet activities during WW II. He was sent to Vorkuta coal mines. In 1956 he moved back to Estonia.

His son is climatologist and politician Andres Tarand and his grandchildren include politician Indrek Tarand and journalist Kaarel Tarand. His nephew is poet, humorist and politician Priit Aimla.

== Pseudonym Aili Helm ==
With Hilja Rüütli they used pseudonym "Aili Helm". Hilja was a nurse and writer who also was sent to Vorkuta camps. Under the pseudonym "Aili Helm", they published five-part sequence of documentary novels about the Soviet prison system.

== Selected works ==
- 1981: poetry collection "Vorkuta värsse" ('The Vorkuta Verses')
- 1990: poetry collection "Epitaaf" (published posthumously)
- 2011: poetry collection "Ürglohutus" (published posthumously)
