= Ott Kangilaski =

Estonian artist (1911–1975)

- Born: June 14, 1911; Verilaske, Governorate of Livonia, Russian Empire
- Died: April 28, 1975 (aged 63); Tallinn, then part of Estonian SSR, Soviet Union
- Education: Pallas Art School
- Occupations: Printmaker, cartoonist, and journalist
- Relatives: Juhan Kangilaski, Jaak Kangilaski

Ott Kangilaski (pseudonym King Kong Kongivere, June 14, 1911 – April 28, 1975) was an Estonian printmaker, cartoonist, and journalist.

== Early life and education ==
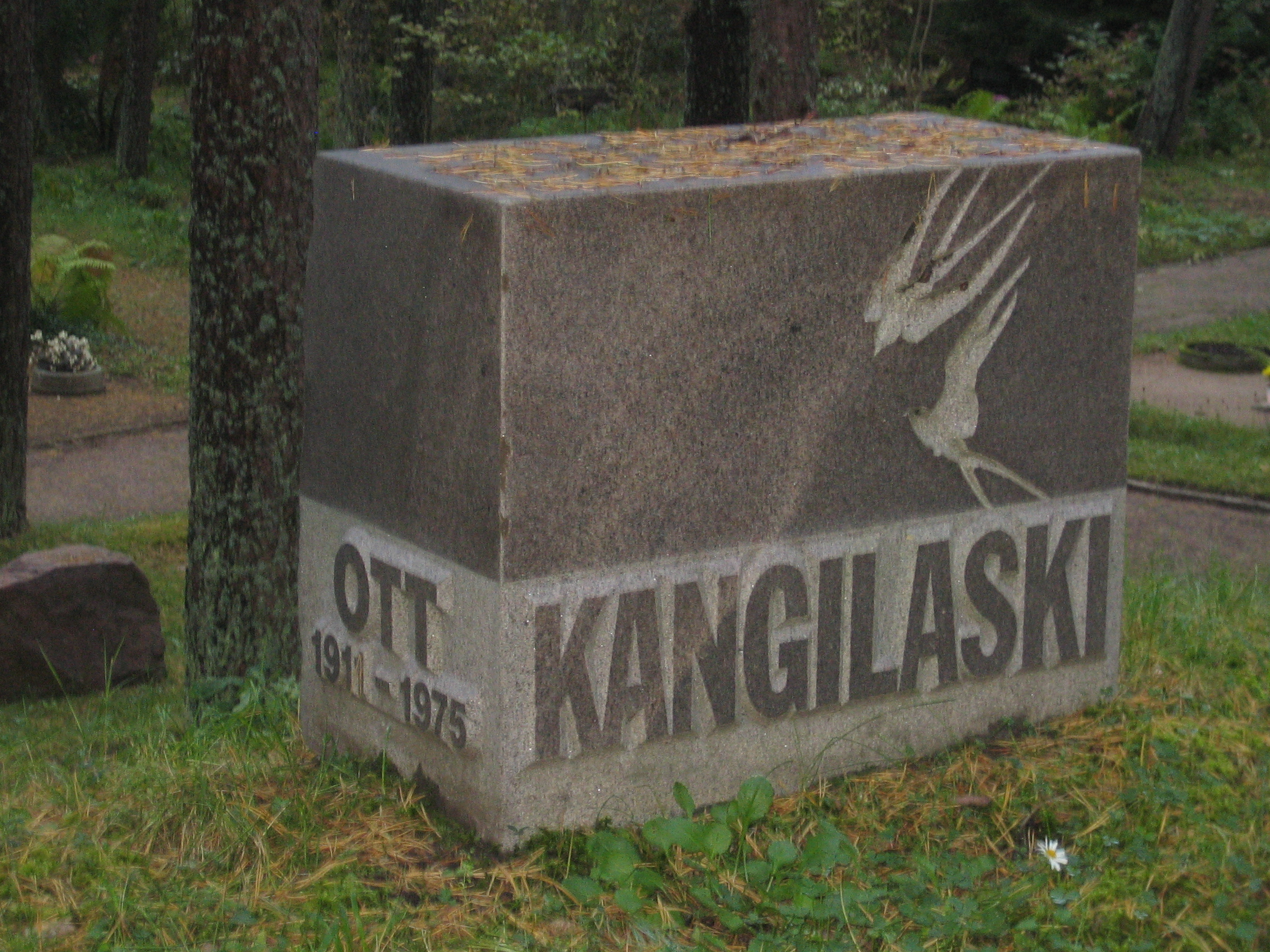
Ott Kangilaski's grave

Ott Kangilaski was born to the farmer Jaak Kangilaski (1866–1951) and his wife Kadri (née Murss; 1869–1956) in Verilaske in Viljandi County. He studied at Arumetsa Primary School and Tartu High School for Boys, and he graduated from high school in Viljandi. From 1931 to 1935, he studied the history of art and literature, and folk poetry at the University of Tartu's Faculty of Philosophy. He participated in the activities of the Veljesto student association; for example, in the large events during the autumn, creating stage texts in verse for mock Martinmas operas, for which he was the main author. His studies at the university were interrupted due to deteriorating health. Starting in 1934, he also studied in Ado Vabbe's studio at the Pallas Art School.

Over the years, however, Kangilaski had already proven himself in the artistic community as a talented book illustrator, among which the works of the poets of the Arbujad literary group received considerable attention. As a result, his main technique became printmaking. From 1940 to 1941, Kangilaski continued his studies at the Konrad Mägi Higher State School of Art under Aino Bach and Arkadio Laigo, and in 1943 he graduated from the Advanced Fine Arts Program in printmaking. He was one of the founders of the Estonian Nature Conservation Society, established in 1966, and an honorary member of the society. He also contributed to the Vanemuine Theater.

Ott Kangilaski is buried in Tallinn's Forest Cemetery.

== Works ==
A large part of Kangilaski's creations and independent graphic works are based on folk poetry. The most notable is a series of historical prints, which display his mastery of gravure printing techniques. He also practiced wood engraving. In the 1950s, his Estonian historical prints and landscapes related to scenes in Kalevipoeg became popular.

Kangilaski worked as a book illustrator and caricaturist, and he wrote art-related articles and books. He wrote about Eduard Wiiralt, gravure printing techniques, and current art issues. Together with his nephew Jaak Kangilaski, he published the popular Kunsti kukeaabitsa (The ABCs of Art, 1968; print run 10,000). In 1969, the collection Jutulõng (Conversation; print run 22,000) was published in the series Loomingu Raamatukogu (Creation Library). Kangilaski illustrated several popular children's books with characters from Estonian folk tales, and he also covered the same subject in his independent graphic works.

Kangilaski began showing his work at exhibitions in 1929, and he appeared in solo exhibitions in 1963 and 1971.

== Recognitions and awards ==
- 1944: Member of the Estonian Artists' Association
- 1945: Medal "For Valiant Labor in the Great Patriotic War 1941–1945"
- 1950: Prize of Soviet Estonia
- 1956: Medal "For Labor Valor"
- 1975: Honored Artist of the Estonian SSR

== Family ==
Ott Kangilaski married Leida Madari (née Ingermann; 1911–1981). He was the brother of the artist Juhan Kangilaski (1904–1981) and the uncle of the art historian Jaak Kangilaski (1939–2022).
