= Andres Langemets =

Estonian publicist and poet

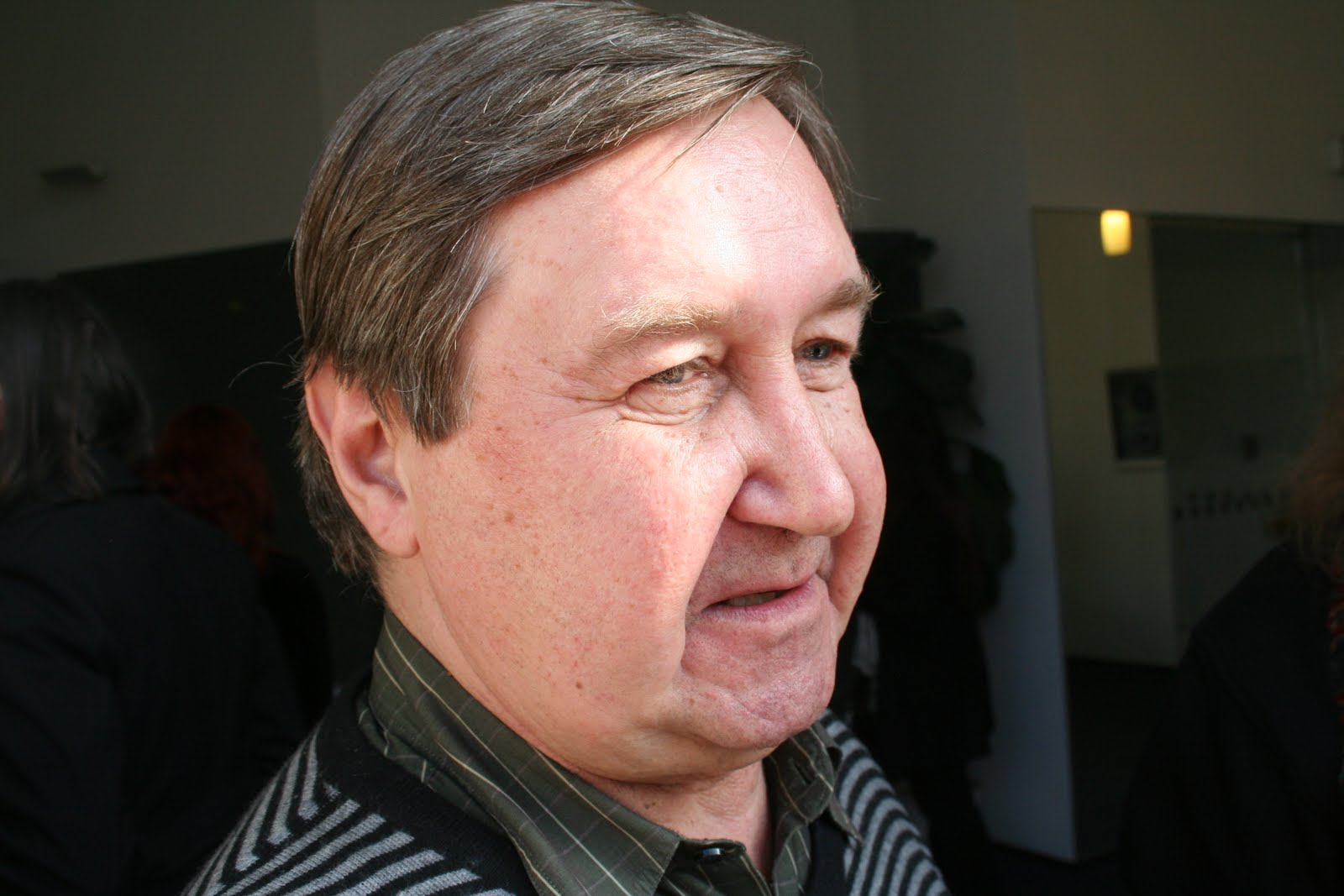
Andres Langemets

Andres Langemets (born 9 March 1948 in Rapla) is an Estonian publicist, poet.

1980, he gave his signature to Letter of 40 intellectuals.

1988–1997, he was the chief editor of the magazine Looming.

In 2006, he was awarded with Order of the National Coat of Arms, IV class.

== Works ==
- poetry collection "Omadus" (1981)
- poetry collection "Üleminekud" (1987)
- literary critics "Post librum. Kijandusmõtisklusi 1972–1987" (1992)
- prose and poetry "Lüroeepika" (1998)
- poem "Vooder" (2008)
- poetry anthology "Tagasisadu. Valik luuletusi 1965–2011" (2012)
