= Krista Kilvet =

Estonian radio journalist, politician and diplomat

Krista Kilvet (née Kanter; May 31, 1946 – January 21, 2009) was an Estonian radio journalist, politician and diplomat.

== Biography ==
Kilvet was born on May 31, 1946, in Tallinn, Estonia. She graduated from the University of Tartu with a major in English. Between 1992 and 1995, she was elected to the Estonian parliament (Riigikogu). In August 2008, she was appointed the Ambassador of Estonia to Norway and Iceland, but wasn't able to assume to this office. Between 1970 and 1990, she was married to the actor Kaarel Kilvet. They had three daughters.
