= Letter of 40 intellectuals =

1980 open letter from 40 Estonian intellectuals

The Letter of 40 intellectuals, also The letter of 40 (Estonian: Neljakümne kiri), originally A public letter from Estonian SSR (Estonian: Avalik kiri Eesti NSV-st) was a public letter dated October 28, 1980 and posted a week later, in which 40 intellectuals attempted to defend the Estonian language and expressed their protest against the recklessness of the Republic-level government in dealing with youth protests sparked a week earlier by the banning of a public performance by the band Propeller. The real reasons were much more deep-seated, and had to do primarily with the Russification policies of the Kremlin in occupied Estonia.

The letter was addressed to the newspapers Pravda, Rahva Hääl, and Sovetskaya Estoniya. None of these, nor any other Soviet publication, printed the letter. However, copies were widely distributed through self-publishing.

== Publication ==
The letter was first published abroad on December 10, 1980 in Eesti Päevaleht in Stockholm, a weekly newspaper run by Estonians in exile. At the same time that the letter circulated in Estonian exile communities, radio stations in other countries broadcast the contents of the letter. Radio Free Europe read the letter in full on 11 December 1980 in the Estonian language, and later also transmitted it in translated form in other languages. Voice of America aired a thorough overview on December 23, 1980. This distribution round, in turn, led to a number of tertiary copies, meaning hand-written transcripts of the reading from the broadcasts began to circulate underground in Estonia.

The letter was translated into English by Jüri Estam. Jaan Pennar contributed editing.

In Estonia, the letter was first officially published in Vikerkaar (no. 7, 1988), together with commentary by Rein Ruutsoo and Lembit Valt.

== Soviet reaction ==
In November 1980, the Soviet government took a number of repressive measures against the signatories: they were "interviewed" at work and by various Party structures, and invited to renounce their signatures. A number of signatories did so.

The Soviet KGB conducted a search at the home of Jaan Kaplinski, whom it suspected was the originator of the letter.

Academician Gustav Naan in turn sent a letter entitled "Some Thoughts About the Ideological Situation" to the Central Committee of the Communist Party of Estonia, demanding reprisals against what he described as the “gang of forty”.

Four signatories were fired from their jobs.

Other repressions were not undertaken against the signatories. The KGB attempted but failed to track down people who had sent copies of the letter out of the country.

== Signatories ==
- Priit Aimla
- Kaur Alttoa
- Madis Aruja
- Lehte Hainsalu
- Mati Hint
- Fred Jüssi
- Aira Kaal
- Maie Kalda
- Tõnu Kaljuste
- Toomas Kall
- Jaan Kaplinski
- Peet Kask
- Heino Kiik
- Jaan Klõšeiko
- Kersti Kreismann
- Alar Laats
- Aare Laht
- Andres Langemets
- Marju Lauristin
- Peeter Lorents
- Vello Lõugas
- Endel Nirk
- Lembit Peterson
- Arno Pukk
- Rein Põllumaa
- Tõnis Rätsep
- Paul-Eerik Rummo
- Rein Ruutsoo
- Ita Saks
- Aavo Sirk
- Mati Sirkel
- Jaan Tamm
- Rein Tamsalu
- Andres Tarand
- Lehte Tavel
- Peeter Tulviste
- Mati Unt
- Arvo Valton
- Juhan Viiding
- Aarne Üksküla

== Literature ==
- Text of the Letter of 40 in English
- 40 kirja lugu by Sirje Kiin, Rein Ruutsoo and Andres Tarand. Olion 1990, ISBN 5-450-01408-2
- Rein Ruutsoo: Tartu Ülikool ja 40 kiri: kodanikuühiskond Eestis ja vastupanu strateegiad, no. 31 in Tartu Ülikooli ajaloo küsimusi, pages 144–181
- Andres Tarand: Kiri ei põle ära: päevaraamat 1980–..., Eesti Päevalehe Kirjastus 2005, ISBN 9985-9662-1-X
