= Mart Kuldkepp =

Estonian historian and academic

Mart Kuldkepp (born 19 September 1983) is an Estonian public commentator. He is Professor of Estonian and Nordic History at University College London. Between 2011 and 2015, he worked in various positions in the University of Tartu Scandinavian studies department, including as head of department and programme director. In 2024, he held Visiting Professor positions at the University of Tartu and Yale University.

Mart Kuldkepp's main research topics are Estonian and Scandinavian political and cultural contacts in the twentieth century, questions of Estonians' nordic identity, and Old Norse literature and culture. At the University of Tartu in 2014, he defended his doctoral dissertation on the subject "Estonia Gravitates towards Sweden: Nordic Identity and Activist Regionalism in World War I".

He has also been engaged in a thorough investigation of Aleksander Kesküla, and in 2015 received an Emerging Scholar Award from the Association for the Advancement of Baltic Studies.

Mart Kuldkepp belongs to the Estonian student society Veljesto. He is also a member of the Learned Estonian Society. In 2025, Old Street Publishing released his book The Shortest History of Scandinavia.
