= Kädy Plaas =

Estonian opera singer (born 1979)

- Born: October 1, 1979 (age 46); Pärnu, then part of Estonian SSR, Soviet Union
- Occupation: opera singer
- Years active: 2002–present

Kädy Plaas (born 1 October 1979 in Pärnu) is an Estonian opera singer (soprano).

She graduated from the Georg Ots Tallinn Music School in 2002 with Marika Eensalu. She then studied as an exchange student at the Hamburg Academy of Music and Theater in 2006–2007 under the guidance of Ingrid Kremling and participated in the master courses of Peter Kooy, Ingrid Kremling, Barbara Bonney, Cathrine Sadolin and Sona Ghazarian. She also graduated from Estonian Academy of Music and Theatre in with a Bachelor of Arts in 2007 and a master's degree in 2014.

Between 2002 and 2004, she sang in the Estonian Philharmonic Chamber Choir and has been a soloist for the project-theatre Nargen Opera from 2004 to 2008, performed at the Estonia and Vanemuise theater and the Hamburg State Opera. Since 2004, Plaas is a voice teacher at Georg Ots Tallinn Music School, and Lecturer at Estonian Academy of Music and Theatre.

She was a member of the Eesti Interpreetide Liidu in 2007.

== Opera roles ==
- Sylvia (Haydn's "Üksik saar", 2004 at Nargen Opera)
- Zelmira (Haydn's "Armida", 2005 at Nargen Operas)
- Hannerl (Schubert's ja Berté's "Kolme neitsi maja", 2005 at Estonia Theatre)
