= Tõnis Rätsep =

Estonian actor and musician (born 1947)

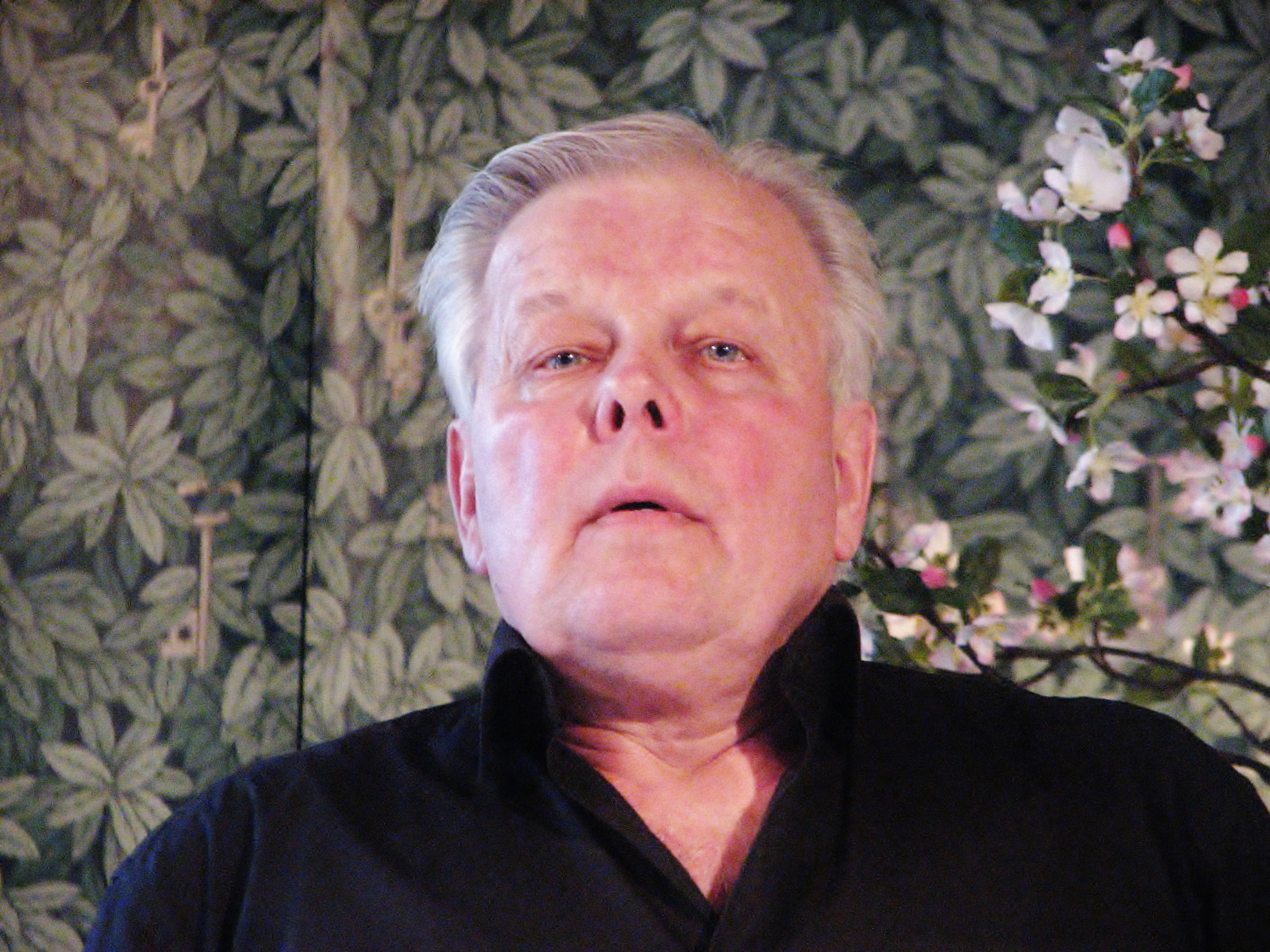
- Rätsep in 2015
- Born: 30 June 1947 (age 79); Viljandi, then part of Estonian SSR, Soviet Union
- Occupations: Actor, musician, educator, poet, and playwright
- Years active: 1972–present
- Children: 2

Tõnis Rätsep (born 30 June 1947) is an Estonian actor, musician, educator, poet, and playwright.

== Early life and education ==
Tõnis Rätsep was born in Viljandi, one of two children to a father who was a dairyman and a mother who worked in a dairy laboratory. The family later relocated to Rakvere, where he attended primary and secondary schools, graduating from Rakvere Secondary School No. 1 in 1965. The same year he graduated from lessons at the Rakvere Music School, having studied bass accordion.

In 1968 he enrolled at the Tallinn University of Technology, majoring in energetics, graduating in 1972. Afterward, he enrolled in the Performing Arts Department of the Tallinn Conservatory (now the Estonian Academy of Music and Theatre), studying acting under instruction of actor and theatre pedagogue Voldemar Panso, graduating in 1972. Among his graduating classmates were Kersti Kreismann, Ivo Eensalu, Vello Janson, Rein Kotkas, Helle Meri (née Pihlak), Katrin Kumpan, Martin Veinmann, and Juhan Viiding.

== Acting career ==
Rätsep's first appearance on Estonian television was a small role in the Virve Aruoja and Jaan Tooming-directed Eesti Telefilm short feature film Lõppematu päev. Later that year, he was cast in the role of Don Antonio in the Arvo Kruusement-directed romantic feature film musical-comedy Don Juan Tallinnas for Tallinnfilm. In 1972, shortly after graduating from the Tallinn Conservatory, Rätsep began an engagement as a stage actor at the Estonian Drama Theatre in Tallinn. He left the theatre in 1975, before returning in 1978, remaining until 1995. From 1973 until 1977, he was a cast member of the Eesti Televisioon (ETV) children's series Mõmmi ja aabits, and rejoined the series when it was resurrected by Eesti Rahvusringhääling as Mõmmi ja aabits. 20 aastat hiljem between 1998 and 1999. In 1975, he appeared as Toomas, opposite actors Elle Kull and Heino Mandri, in the Tõnis Kask and Ben Drui-directed television drama film Aeg maha!.

In addition to acting, Rätsep has also composed the musical score for the 2011 Arko Okk-directed documentary Monoloogid 3D.

== Collaboration with Juhan Viiding ==
While attending the Tallinn Conservatory, Tõnis Rätsep befriended classmate Juhan Viiding. Apart from acting, the two shared a love of music and poetry and began a lifelong collaboration – reciting poetry set to music at venues throughout Estonia. In 1972, Rätsep and Viiding, along with actor Lembit Ulfsak, formed the musical ensemble Amor Trio, which performed songs from the 1930s and 1940s, frequently appearing on television. The trio disbanded the following year. An album titled Amor Trio 1972 was released in 2004 on the Theka label. In 1979, Rätsep and Viiding co-wrote a play titled Olevused, republished in 2014 by Eesti Keele Sihtasutus. In 1989, the duo recorded an album, Öötöö, as a cassette-only release for the Estonian label Kuldnokk. Rätsep and Viiding would remain close friends until Viiding's suicide in 1995. Their last performance together, Kallis õhtu, took place in 1994 at the café of Rakvere Theatre.

== Politics ==
In October 1980, Rätsep was a signatory of the Letter of 40 Intellectuals, a public letter in which forty prominent Estonian intellectuals defended the Estonian language and protested the Russification policies of the Kremlin in Estonia. The signatories also expressed their unease against Republic-level government in harshly dealing with youth protests in Tallinn that were sparked a week earlier due to the banning of a public performance of the punk rock band Propeller.

Following Estonia's regaining independence from the Soviet Union, Rätsep became a member of the conservative Isamaa party, and served on the Tallinn City Central Council.

== Educator ==
From 1975 until 1981, Rätsep was a lecturer at the Tallinn Pedagogical Institute, and from 1995 until 2004 he was a lecturer at the Estonian Institute of Humanities. Since 1995, he has been a teacher at the Old Town Educational College, and a lecturer at the Institute of Theology of the Estonian Evangelical Lutheran Church since 2000.

== Acknowledgements ==
- Order of the White Star, V Class (2001)
- Order of the National Coat of Arms, IV Class (2006)
- Karl Ader Award (2006)
