= Jaan Klõšeiko =

Estonian printmaker and photographer

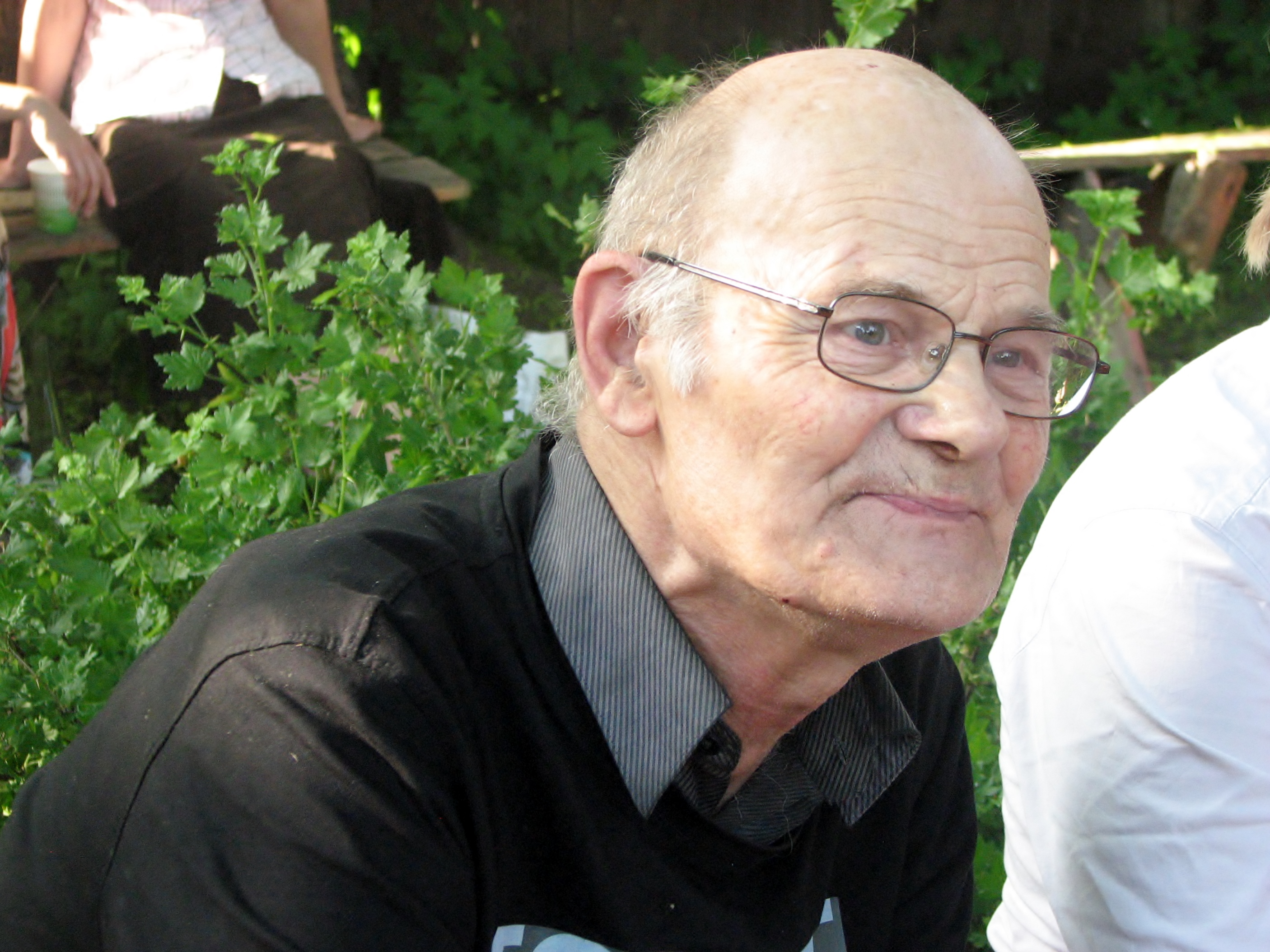
Jaan Klõšeiko at the HeadRead festival on 2 June 2013

Jaan Klõšeiko (10 September 1939, Tallinn – 21 December 2016, Tallinn) was an Estonian printmaker and photographer.

Klõšeiko graduated from Tallinn Secondary School No. 22 in 1958. He continued his studies at the Estonian Academy of Arts and graduated in 1964 with a specialty in graphic arts.

Klõšeiko worked at the publishing houses Valgus and Eesti Raamat, at the magazine Noorus and at the newspaper Televisioon. He was the head designer of Kunst in 1975. He also designed soundboard covers, worked as a photographer and captured cultural history events and people of culture, and the like. He participated in art and photo exhibitions from 1965, and was a member of the Estonian Artists' Union from 1979 to his death.

Klõšeiko was a signatory of the Letter of 40 intellectuals in 1980.

Klõšeiko died on 21 December 2016 and was later buried at Metsakalmistu.

== Awards ==
- 2001: 4th class of the Order of the White Star (received 23 January 2001)
- 2006: 4th class of the Order of the Coat of National Arms (received 23 February 2006)
