= Andres Tarand =

Prime Minister of Estonia

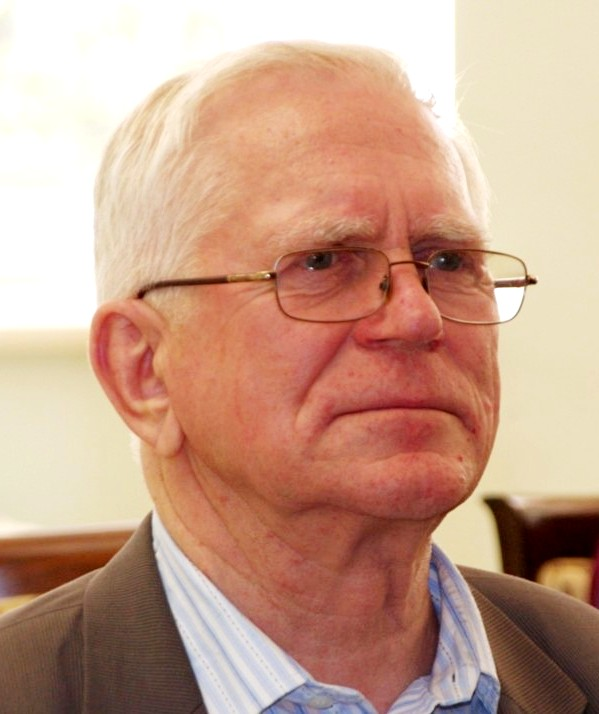
- Tarand in 2012

Prime Minister of Estonia
- In office 8 November 1994 – 17 April 1995
- President: Lennart Meri
- Preceded by: Mart Laar
- Succeeded by: Tiit Vähi

Minister of the Environment
- In office 1992–1994
- Prime Minister: Mart Laar
- Preceded by: Tõnis Kaasik
- Succeeded by: Vootele Hansen

Personal details
- Born: 11 January 1940 (age 86) Tallinn, Estonia
- Party: Social Democratic Party

Andres Tarand (born 11 January 1940) is an Estonian geographer, climatologist and politician who served as the Prime Minister of Estonia from 1994 to 1995. He was also a Member of the European Parliament (MEP) for the Social Democratic Party, part of the Party of European Socialists, between 2004 and 2009.

Tarand was born in Tallinn. His father was poet, philologist, philosopher and cultural figure Helmut Tarand. He graduated from the University of Tartu with a degree in climatology in 1963. After receiving his first degree he continued his studies at Tartu receiving a second degree in geography in 1973. He continued to do research at Tartu, eventually becoming director of research in 1979, to 1981.

In October 1980, Tarand was a signatory of the Letter of 40 Intellectuals, a public letter in which forty prominent Estonian intellectuals defended the Estonian language and protested the Russification policies of the Kremlin in Estonia. The signatories also expressed their unease against Republic-level government in harshly dealing with youth protests in Tallinn that were sparked a week earlier due to the banning of a public performance of the punk rock band Propeller.

Besides serving as director of research at University of Tartu, Tarand has also been a member of the board for the university, since 1996, as well as director of the Tallinn Botanical Gardens, from 1988 to 1990.

Tarand has also been a member of the Estonian Parliament from 1992 to 2004. While in parliament Tarand served as the Minister of the Environment twice, 1992 to 1994 and 1994 to 1995, as well as his term as prime minister. He was elected to the European Parliament in June 2004.

Tarand has also been involved in environmental and sustainable development concerns not only in Estonia but throughout the Baltic and Nordic states. His involvement in these concerns has led to his involvement in such organisations as the Estonian Geographical Association, Estonian Institute for Sustainable Development, Stockholm Environment Institute, Estonian Nature Fund, and GLOBE International Europe. He has published a title ''Tornadoes in Estonia'' with Éditions Universitaires Européennes.

Andres Tarand and his wife, journalist Mari Tarand (née Viiding; 1941–2020) have two sons. The elder son Indrek Tarand (born 1964) is a politician, historian and journalist who also won a seat in the European Parliament, running as an independent candidate in the 2009 election. The younger son Kaarel Tarand (born 1966) is a well-known journalist. His first cousin is writer, poet, humorist and politician Priit Aimla.

Political offices
| Preceded by Jüri Martin | Director of Tallinn Botanic Garden; 1989–1990 | Succeeded by Heiki Tamm |
| Preceded by Tõnis Kaasik | Estonian Minister of the Environment; 1992–1994 | Succeeded by Vootele Hansen |
| Preceded by Mart Laar | Prime Minister of Estonia; 1994–1995 | Succeeded by Tiit Vähi |
