= Harry Liivrand =

Estonian art historian and diplomat

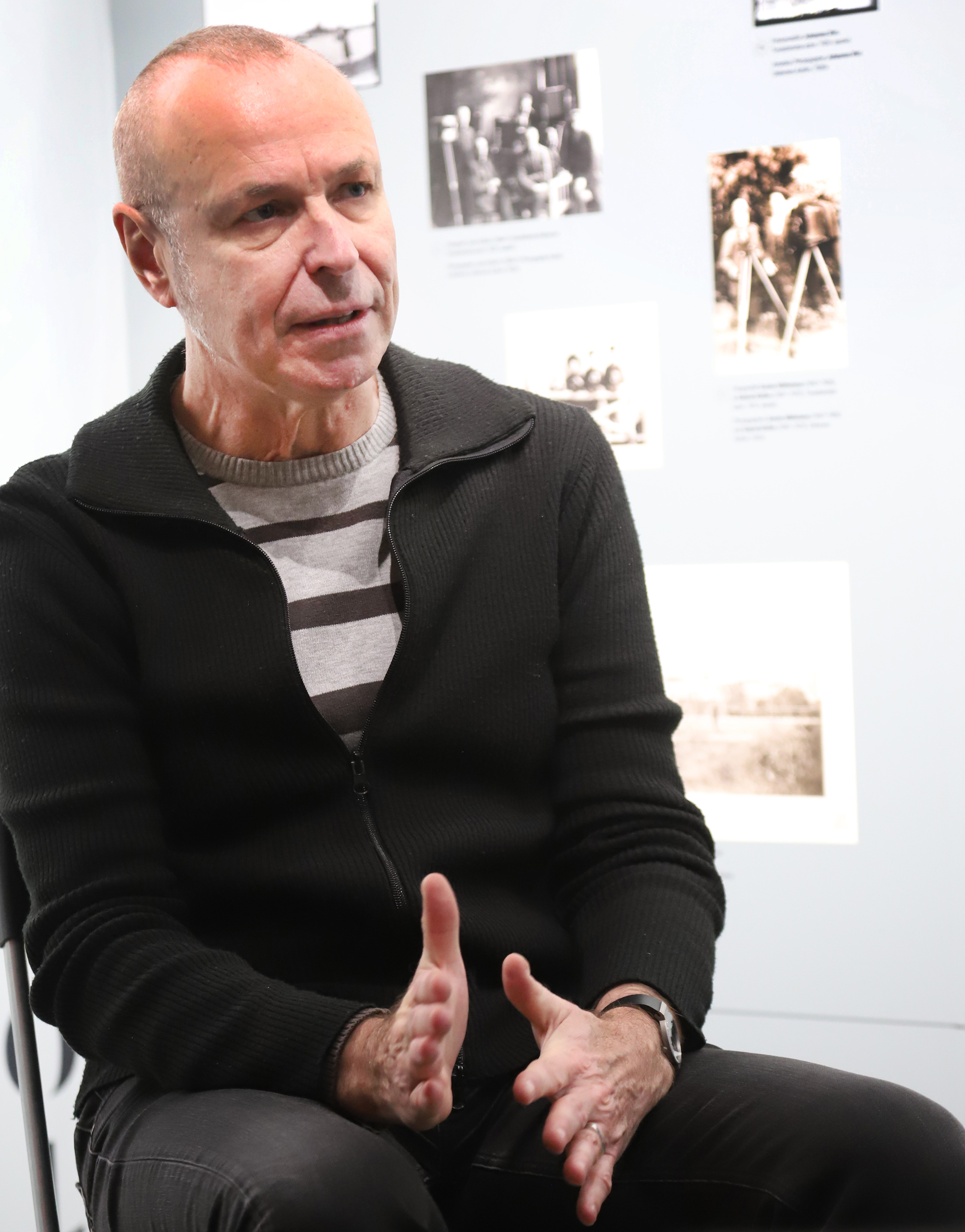
Harry Liivrand (2024)

Harry Liivrand (born 17 June 1961 in Tallinn) is an Estonian art critic, art historian, curator and diplomat.

== Biography ==
In 1984–1993, he worked as a senior researcher at the Estonian Art Museum. After the restoration of Estonian independence, he started working in the press, working for the newspaper Hommikuleht. However, for more than ten years he worked as an art and culture editor at Eesti Ekspress (1991 and 1994–2008). At the same time, he worked as a curator in the Tallinn galleries Deco (1994–1998) and Viviann Napp (2002–2006). He has organized dozens of exhibitions in Estonia and abroad.

1991 and 1991–2008, he was an art and cultural editor at the newspaper Eesti Ekspress.

In 2008, he became the head of Tallinn Art Hall. During 2011–2016 he was the cultural attaché of the Estonian Embassy in Berlin. Since 2016, he is the chief specialist in science and communication at the Academic Library of Tallinn University.

== Awards ==
- 2006: Kristjan Raud Prize
- 2018: Order of the White Star, V class.
