= Mari Tarand =

Estonian radio journalist (1941–2020)

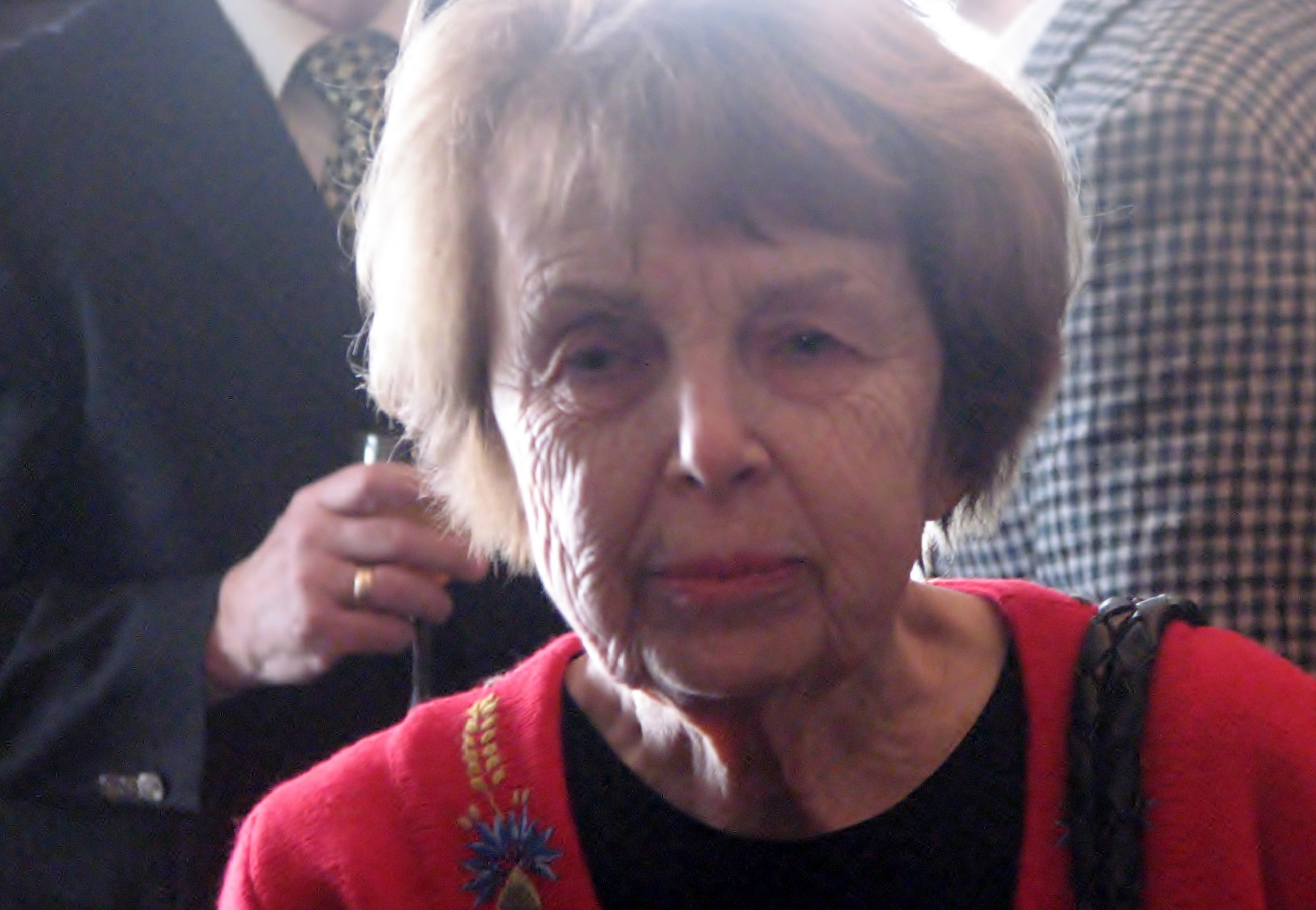
Tarand in 2013

Mari Tarand (née Mari Viiding;14 January 1941 Tallinn – 5 October 2020) was an Estonian radio journalist.

Her spouse was Andres Tarand. She is the mother of Indrek and Kaarel Tarand and older sister of poet Juhan Viiding.

In 1963 she graduated from Tartu State University in Estonian philology. 1963-2005 she was an editor and commentator at Estonian Radio. Besides radio programs she also has written screenwritings for films.

In 2004 she was awarded with the Order of the White Star, IV class.
