= Elmar Salumaa =

Estonian theologian

Elmar Salumaa (15 December 1908 Vara Parish – 1 January 1996 Kilingi-Nõmme) was an Estonian theologian.

In 1935 he graduated from Tartu University in religion. From 1937 to 1940 and 1942 to 1944, he taught at Tartu University. From 1944 to 1945 he was a pastor at Laiuse Congregation. In 1945 he was arrested and until 1955 he was imprisoned. From 1956 to 1995 he was a professor at the Institute of Theology of the Estonian Evangelical Lutheran Church. From 1969 to 1995 he was a pastor at Saarde Congregation.

== Works ==
- Sören Kierkegaard (1939, 1992)
- Antiikfilosoofia ajalugu (1991)
- Filosoofia ajalugu (5 volumes, 1992–1998).
- Tiib pandud aastaile õlale
- Süstemaatilise teoloogia käsiraamat ehk dogmaatika märksõnades
- Evangeelium ja eetos
- Nartsiss ja Goldmund
