= Krista Kodres =

Estonian art historian and swimmer

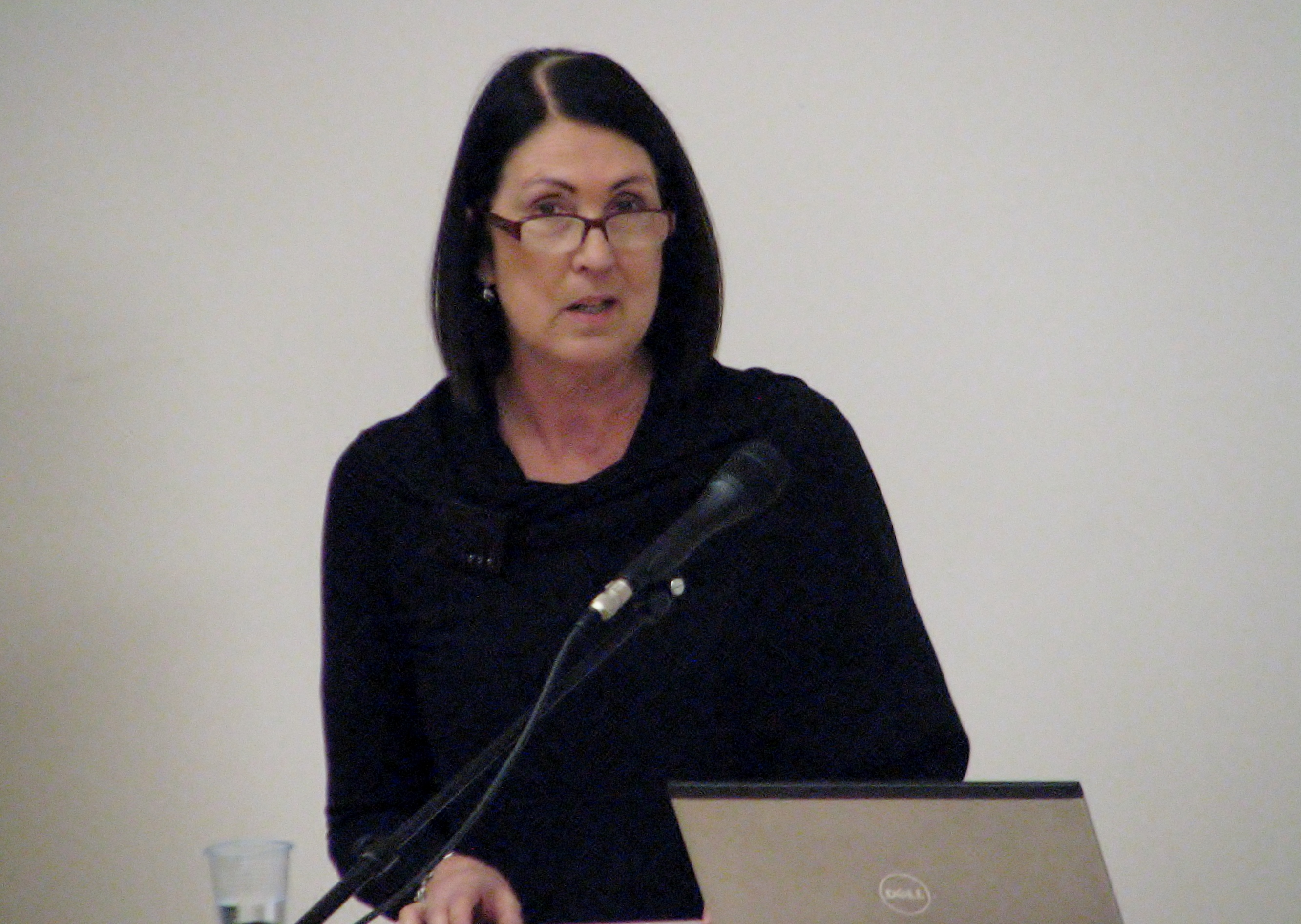
Krista Kodres

Krista Kodres (until 1979 Krista Saar; born on 15 October 1957 in Tallinn) is an Estonian art historian and former backstroke and freestyle swimmer.

From 1971 until 1974, she become 7-times Estonian champion in different swimming disciplines and was a member of Estonian swimming team. She has set 13 national records.

Kodres graduated from Tartu State University in 1980 with a degree in art history.

She is one of the founder of Estonian Architecture Museum and from 1991 until 1993, was its science director. From 1993 until 1995, she was the science prorector and from 1995 until 1998, the prorector of the Estonian Academy of Arts. She has been a senior researcher at the Institute of History of Tallinn University since 2007.

== Awards ==
- 2013: Order of the White Star, III class.
