= Vootele Hansen =

Estonian politician (1962–2026)

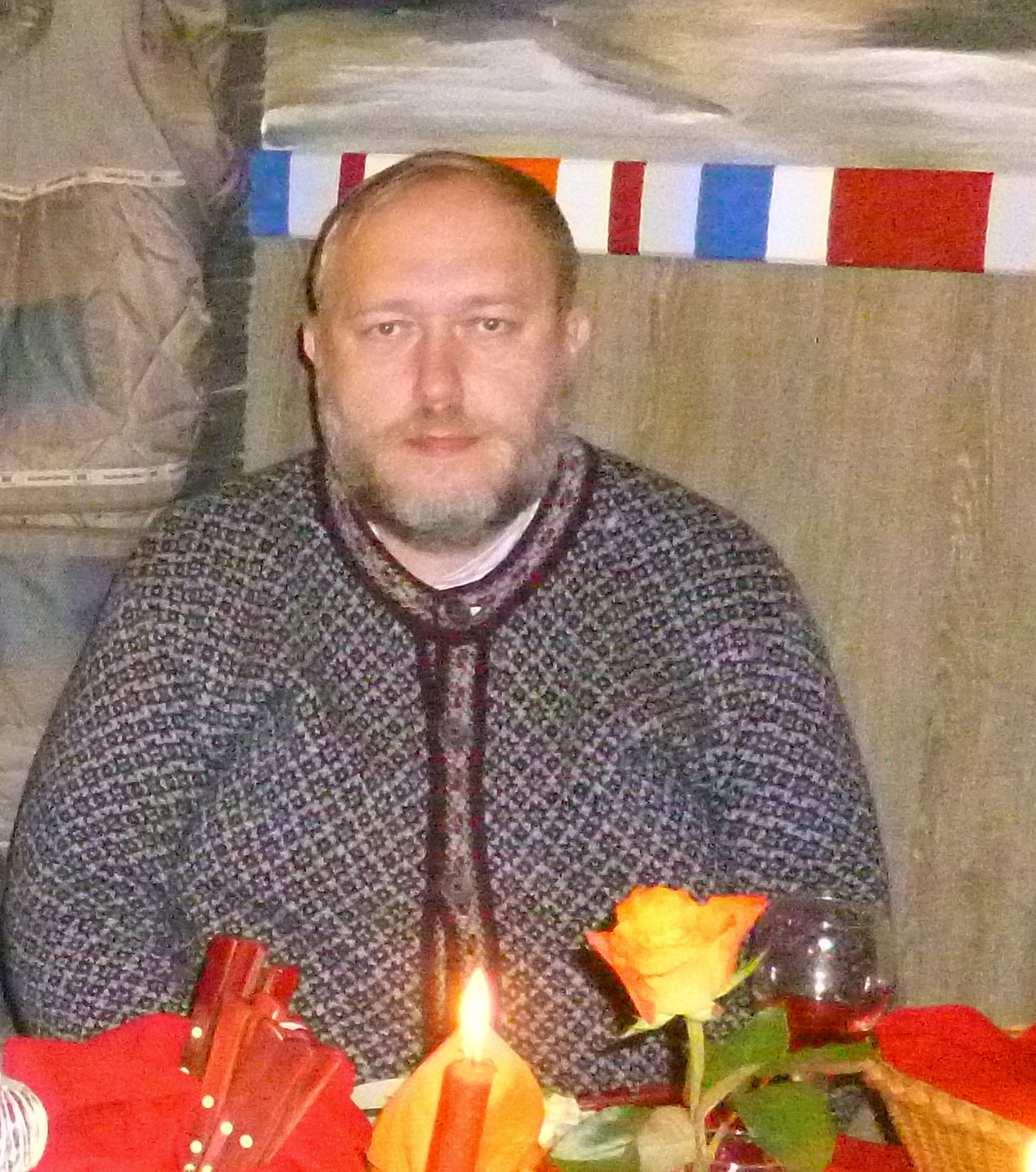
Hansen in 2014

Vootele Hansen (19 January 1962 – 10 April 2026) was an Estonian politician. He was a member of VIII and IX Riigikogu. From 1994 to 1995 he was Minister of the Environment. Hansen was born in Tallinn on 19 January 1962, and died there on 10 April 2026, at the age of 64.
