= Kaarel Tarand =

Estonian journalist (born 1966)

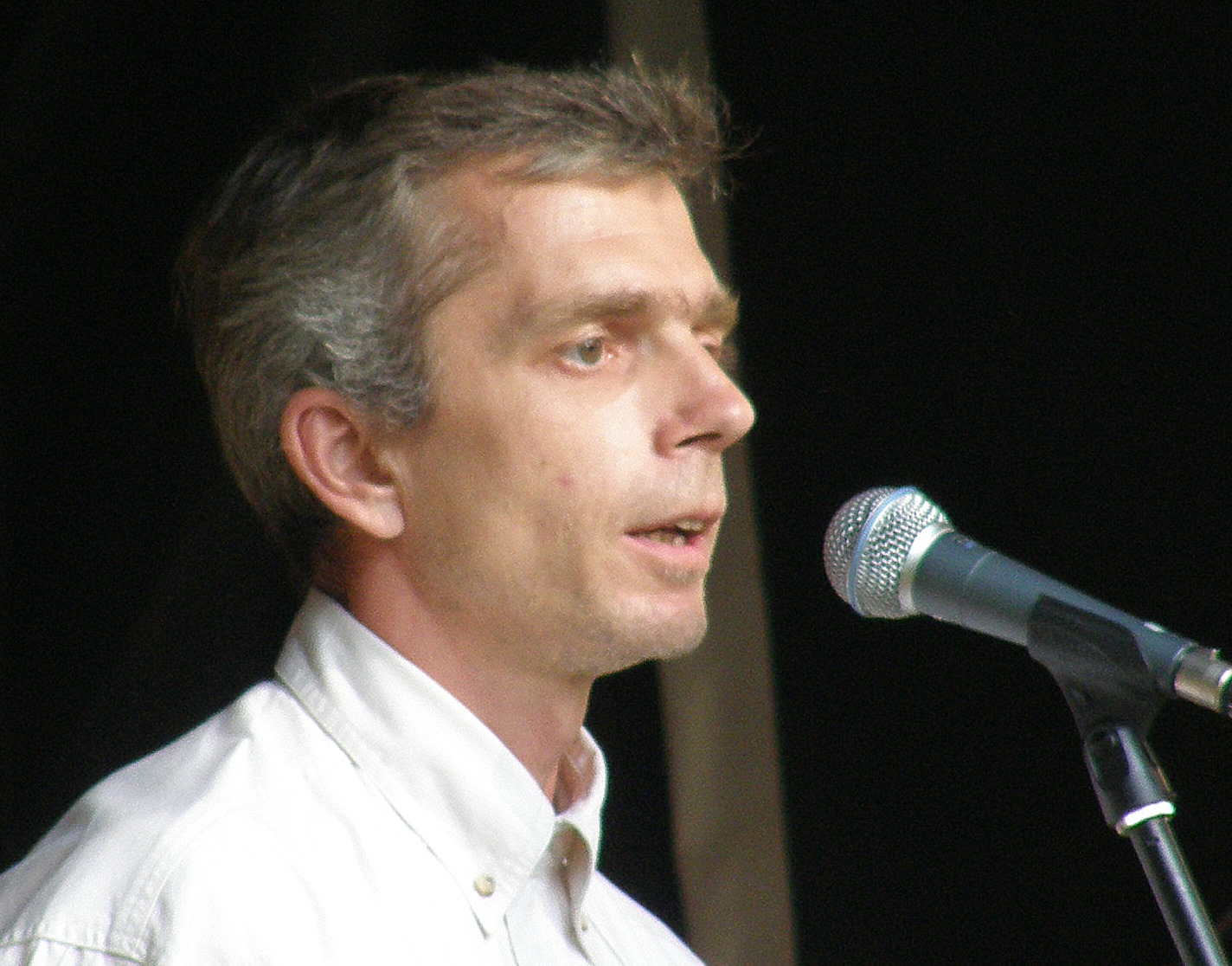
Kaarel Tarand

Kaarel Tarand (born 20 September 1966) is an Estonian journalist and editor.

He was born in Tallinn to geographer, climatologist and politician Andres Tarand and radio journalist Mari Tarand. His older brother is politician Indrek Tarand. He has three children. During 1987–1996 he studied philology and social sciences at the University of Tartu.

In 1996–1999, he was the editor of magazine Luup. Since 2002, he has worked as a columnist at newspaper Eesti Päevaleht. Since 2005, he has been a chief editor of newspaper Sirp.
