= Juhan Viiding =

Estonian poet and actor (1948–1995)

- Born: 1 June 1948; Tallinn, then part of Estonian SSR, Soviet Union
- Died: 21 February 1995 (aged 46); Rapla, Estonia
- Other name: Jüri Üdi
- Occupations: Poet, actor
- Spouse: Riina Kiisk
- Children: Elo Viiding
- Relatives: Mari Tarand (sister)

Juhan Viiding (1 June 1948 – 21 February 1995), also known under the pseudonym of Jüri Üdi was an Estonian poet and actor.

== Personal life ==
Juhan Viiding was born on 1 June 1948 in Tallinn to Paul Viiding, a well-known poet in Estonia who had belonged to the influential Arbujad (Soothsayers) – a collective group of eight young influential poets who rose to prominence before the outbreak of World War II – and Linda Viiding (née Laarmann), a noted translator. Juhan was the youngest of four children and the only boy—his older sisters were Reet, Anni and radio journalist Mari Tarand. He was an intellectually precocious and restless youngster. Between the years 1968 and 1972, Viiding studied theatre and stagecraft at the Tallinn Conservatory (now the Estonian Academy of Music and Theatre), under instruction of actor and theatre pedagogue Voldemar Panso, graduating in 1972. Among his graduating classmates were Kersti Kreismann, Ivo Eensalu, Vello Janson, Rein Kotkas, Helle Meri (née Pihlak), Katrin Kumpan, Martin Veinmann, and Tõnis Rätsep.

Juhan Viiding was married to Riina Kiisk, the daughter of actor, film director and politician Kaljo Kiisk. Their daughter Elo is also a poet.

On 21 February 1995 Juhan Viiding committed suicide in Rapla by cutting his wrists.

== Dramatic career ==
Upon his graduation in 1972, Viiding worked in Tallinn's National Drama Theatre (now the Estonian Drama Theatre).

During the last ten years of his life Viiding staged many plays. His favourite playwrights were Samuel Beckett, Eugène Ionesco, and Minoru Betsuyaku.

Viiding worked at the Estonian Drama Theatre until his death on 21 February 1995.

== Literary career ==
Juhan Viiding who until 1975 published his poetry under the pseudonym Jüri Üdi was the brightest talent to appear in Estonian poetry in the 1970s. Unlike the major poets of the immediately preceding generation (Rummo, Kaplinski, Runnel), he never wrote essays or criticism.

The heteronymic poetics of the modern Portuguese classic Fernando Pessoa (whose selected poetry was translated into Estonian in 1973), may have served as an impulse for Juhan Viiding to create the poet Jüri Üdi. However, the difference between the works published under the author's name and his pseudonym is that the "marrow" of Juhan Viiding's poetry remained in his George Marrow pseudonym; what followed, under his authentic name, lacked the former brilliance. Jüri Üdi's playfulness and rich undertones gave way to a more direct and pathetic expression. It is not known whether Viiding intended to develop a second poetic voice in addition to that of Jüri Üdi, or that he simply realized that the Soviet era of ideological symbols—as described in his "Jüri’s Yarn"—was coming to an end and the actor Jüri Üdi could drop the mask to reveal Juhan Viiding's true literary face.

In October 1980, Viiding was a signatory of the Letter of 40 intellectuals, a public letter in which forty prominent Estonian intellectuals defended the Estonian language and protested the Russification policies of the central government of the USSR in then Soviet-occupied Estonia. The signatories also expressed their unease with the harsh manner in which the Soviet police and KGB were treating the Estonian youth protests that had been sparked in Tallinn a week earlier after the Soviet authorities had banned a concert of the punk rock band Propeller.

== Awards ==
- Ants Lauter Actor Award in 1978
- Juhan Smuul Literary Prize in 1984 for his collection Tänan ja palun
- Juhan Liiv Poetry Award in 1985 for the poem “Soov” (‘A Wish’)

== Selected works ==
- Närvitrükk (Nerve Print, 1971)
- Aastalaat (Year's Fair, 1971)
- Detsember (December, 1971)
- Käekäik (1973)
- Selges eesti keeles (In Plain Estonian, 1974) Note: As a footnote of the title Viiding requested that the name of the language in the title has to be renamed to the one that was used for translating. Therefore, the translation of the title should be "In Plain English"
- Armastuskirjad (Love Letters, 1975)
- Ma olin Jüri Üdi (I Was George Marrow, 1978)
- Olevused (Beings, 1979) Note: Co-written with Tõnis Rätsep
- Elulootus (Hope of Life/Being without a Biography, 1980) Note: Due to the clever wordplay in the title as it is in the original Estonian, both of the "translations" presented here are correct. In an interview, Viiding admitted that the wordplay in the title was intentional.
- Tänan ja Palun (Cheers and Please, 1983)
- Osa (Part, 1991)
