= Jaak Kangilaski =

Estonian art historian (1939–2022)

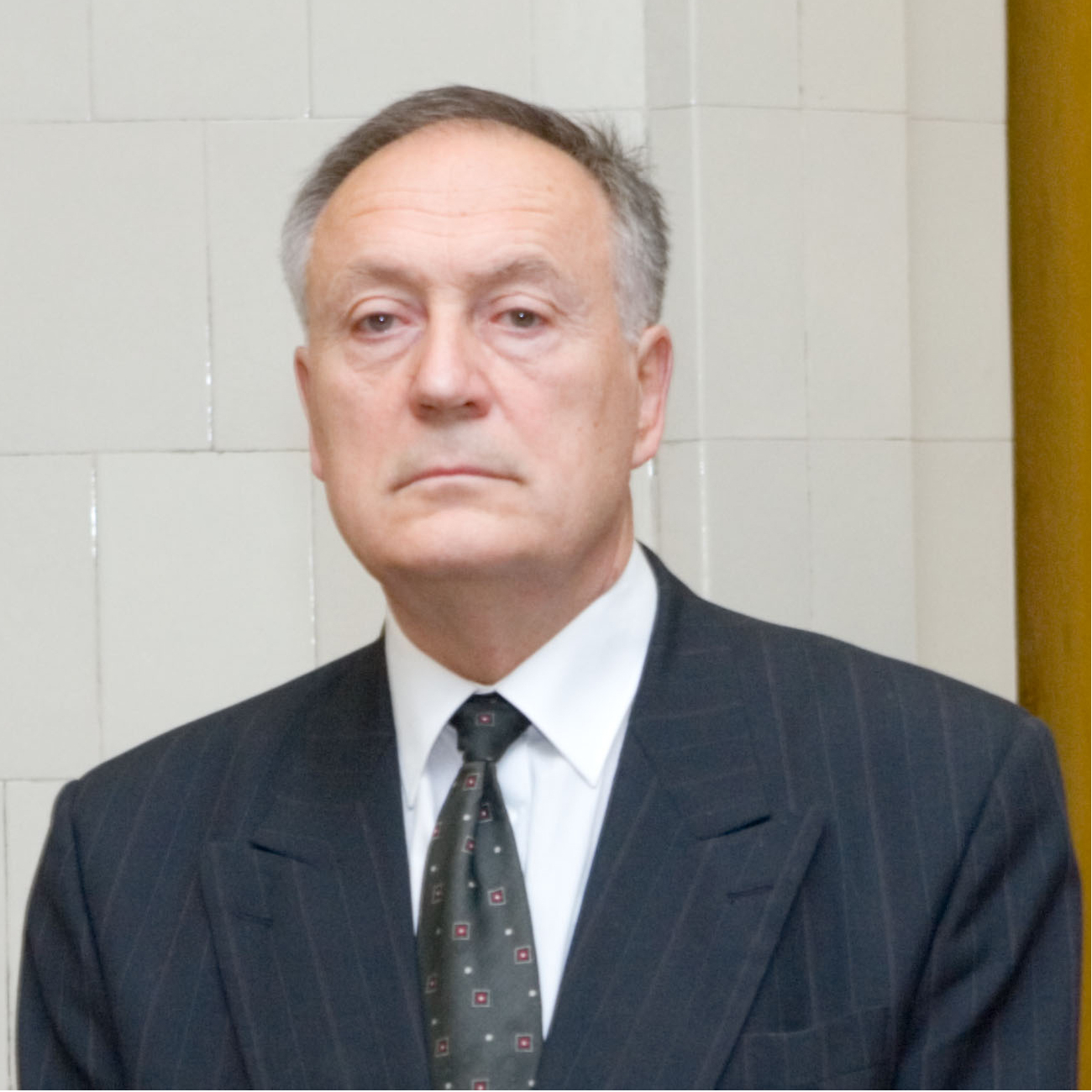
Jaak Kangilaski

Jaak Kangilaski (10 December 1939 – 30 August 2022) was an Estonian art historian.

In 1971, Kangilaski began working as a lecturer at the Estonian SSR State Art Institute (now, the Estonian Academy of Arts). From 1978 until 1987, he was the Head of the Department of Art History. From 1987 until 1989, he was the vice rector of the university, and from 1989 until 1995, he was the rector of the university. In 1995, Jaak Kangilaski was elected Professor of Art History at the University of Tartu. He worked in this position until 2005. In 2006 he was appointed Professor Emeritus of the University of Tartu. In 2014, Jaak Kangilaski was elected Professor Emeritus of the Estonian Academy of Arts.

In 1998 he was awarded the Order of the National Coat of Arms, IV class. He was the nephew of the artist Ott Kangilaski.
