= Saarde, Pärnu County =

Village in Estonia

Saarde
- Village
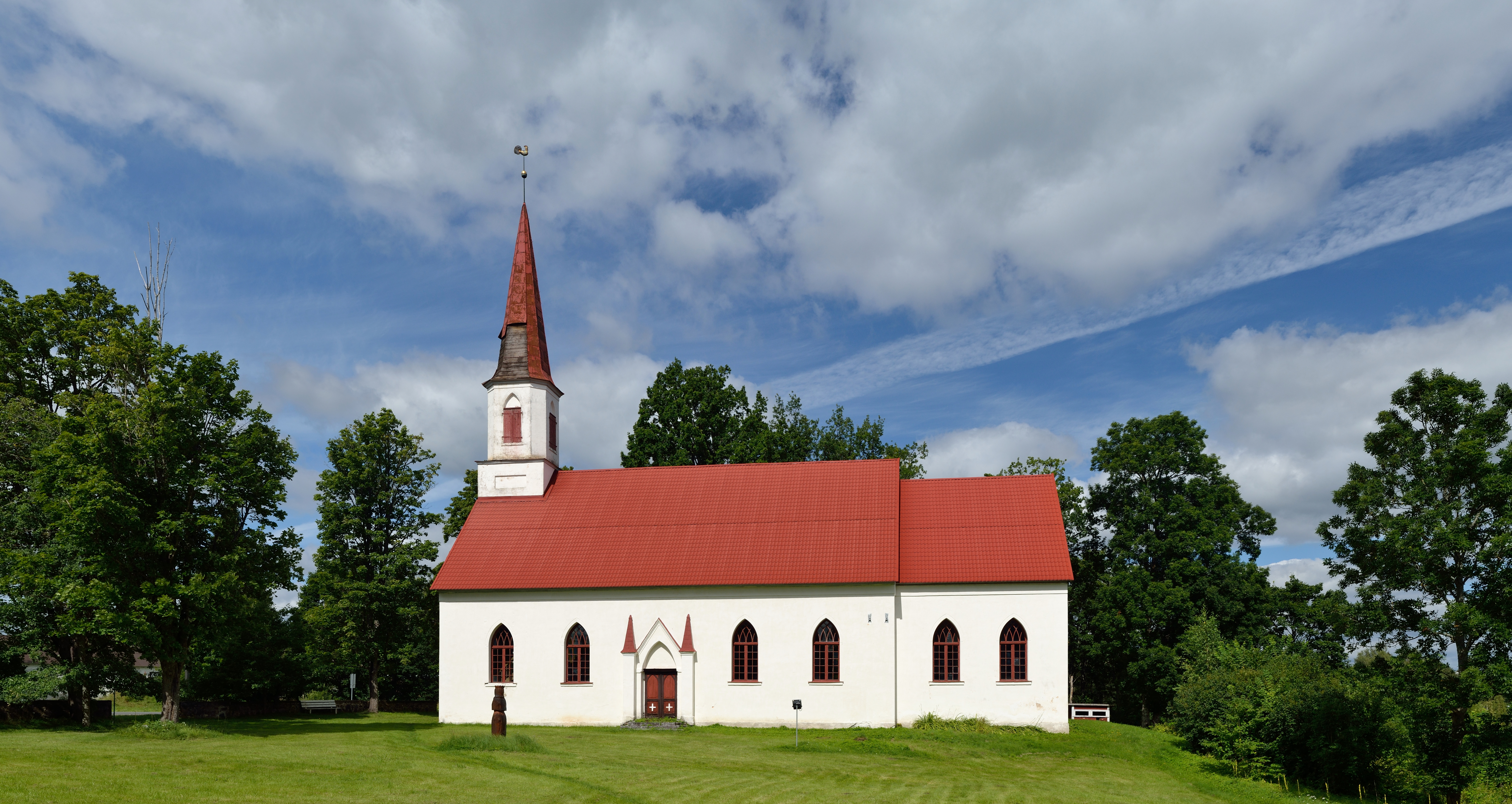
- Saint Catherine's Church in Saarde.

- Location in Estonia
- Coordinates: 58°08′18″N 24°58′01″E
- Country: Estonia
- County: Pärnu County
- Municipality: Saarde Parish

Population (2011 Census)
  - Total: 318

Saarde is a village in Saarde Parish, Pärnu County in southwestern Estonia. It is located just south of the town of Kilingi-Nõmme, the administrative centre of the municipality. As of the 2011 census, the settlement's population was 318.

Saarde is the location of St. Cathrine's Church, built from 1858 to 1859 on the site of a previous church from 1684.

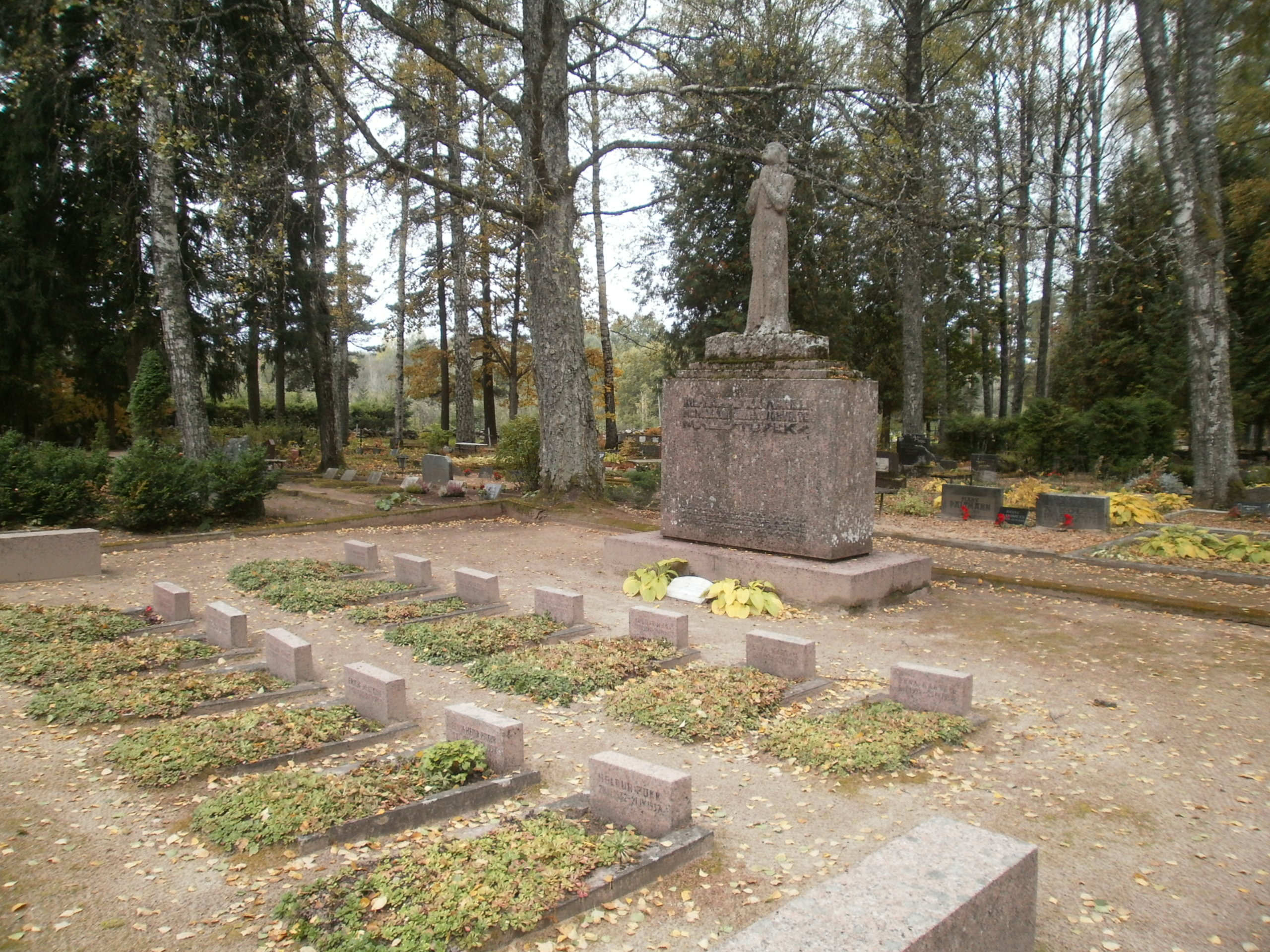
Memorial in Saarde Cemetery to the eighteen children killed in the Kilingi-Nõmme II primary school fire of 1937
