= National Institute of Chemical Physics and Biophysics =

Research institute in Estonia

National Institute of Chemical Physics and Biophysics (NICPB; Estonian Keemilise ja Bioloogilise Füüsika Instituut, or KBFI) is public non-profit research institute that carries out fundamental and applied research and engages in the development of the novel directions in material sciences, physics, chemistry, gene- and biotechnology, environmental technology, and computer science. in Estonia, Tallinn at the address Akadeemia tee 23.
