= Heljo Mänd =

Estonian writer, novelist, newspaper editor, and poet (1934–2020)

Heljo Mänd (until 1934 Heljo Kleinmüller, 1934–1946 Heljo Raidla; 11 February 1926 in Narva – 6 December 2020) was an Estonian children's writer, novelist, newspaper editor and poet.

She studied at Tallinn Secondary School of Business, and Estonian State Theatre Institute. In 1956 she was an editor for the children and youth newspaper Säde, from 1958 until 1965 she was an editor for the children's magazine Pioneer, and from 1960 until 1965 an editor for the children's magazine Täheke. Since 1965 she was a freelance writer.

Since 1961 she was a member of Estonian Writers' Union.

== Selected works ==
- television script: "Mõmmi ja aabits" ('Teddy's ABC')
- television script: "Nõiakivi" ('The Magic Stone')
- 1968: story "Toomas Linnupoeg" ('Thomas Bird-Boy')
- 1971: alphabet book "Karu-aabits" ('Teddy's ABC'),
- 1984: short-story collection "Väikesed võililled" ('Little Dandelions').
- 2017 poem "Salasõna" ('Password')
