= Kaarel Kilvet =

Estonian actor, singer, and director (1944–2005)

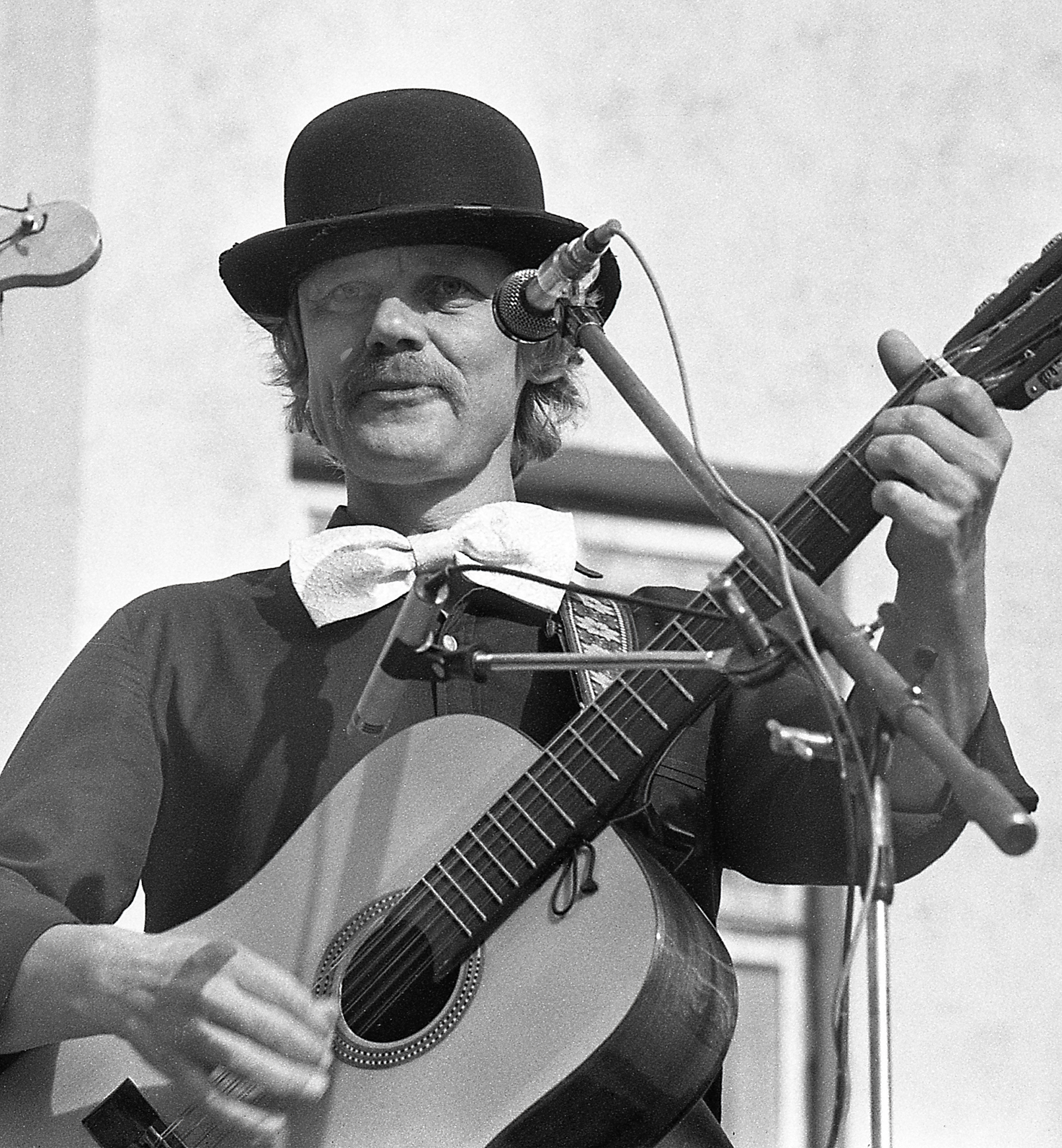
Kilvet performing in 1984

Kaarel Kilvet (13 July 1944 in Pärnu – 30 April 2005 in Tallinn) was an Estonian actor, singer and director.

In 1970 he graduated from Tallinn State Conservatory's Performing Arts Department. 1970-1993 he was an actor and director in Estonian Youth Theatre. 1993-1998 he was a director in Endla Theatre. Since 1998 he was a freelancer.

He was a member of the folk music groups Kukerpillid and Leegajus, and a founder and member of the folk and comedy musical trio Hampelmann, with Jüri Aarma and Lauri Nebel.

Besides stage roles he appeared also in several films and in radio theatre.

Awards:

- 2005: Order of the White Star, V class.

== Filmography ==
- 1972: Verekivi (feature film; role: the gate guard)
- 1973–1978: Mõmmi ja aabits (television series; director)
- 1981: Nukitsamees (feature film, music film; role: Estonian: Ätt)
- 1994: Jüri Rumm (feature film; role: musician)
- 1998: Mõmmi ja aabits. 20 aastat hiljem (television series; director)
