= Elo Viiding =

Estonian poet (born 1974)

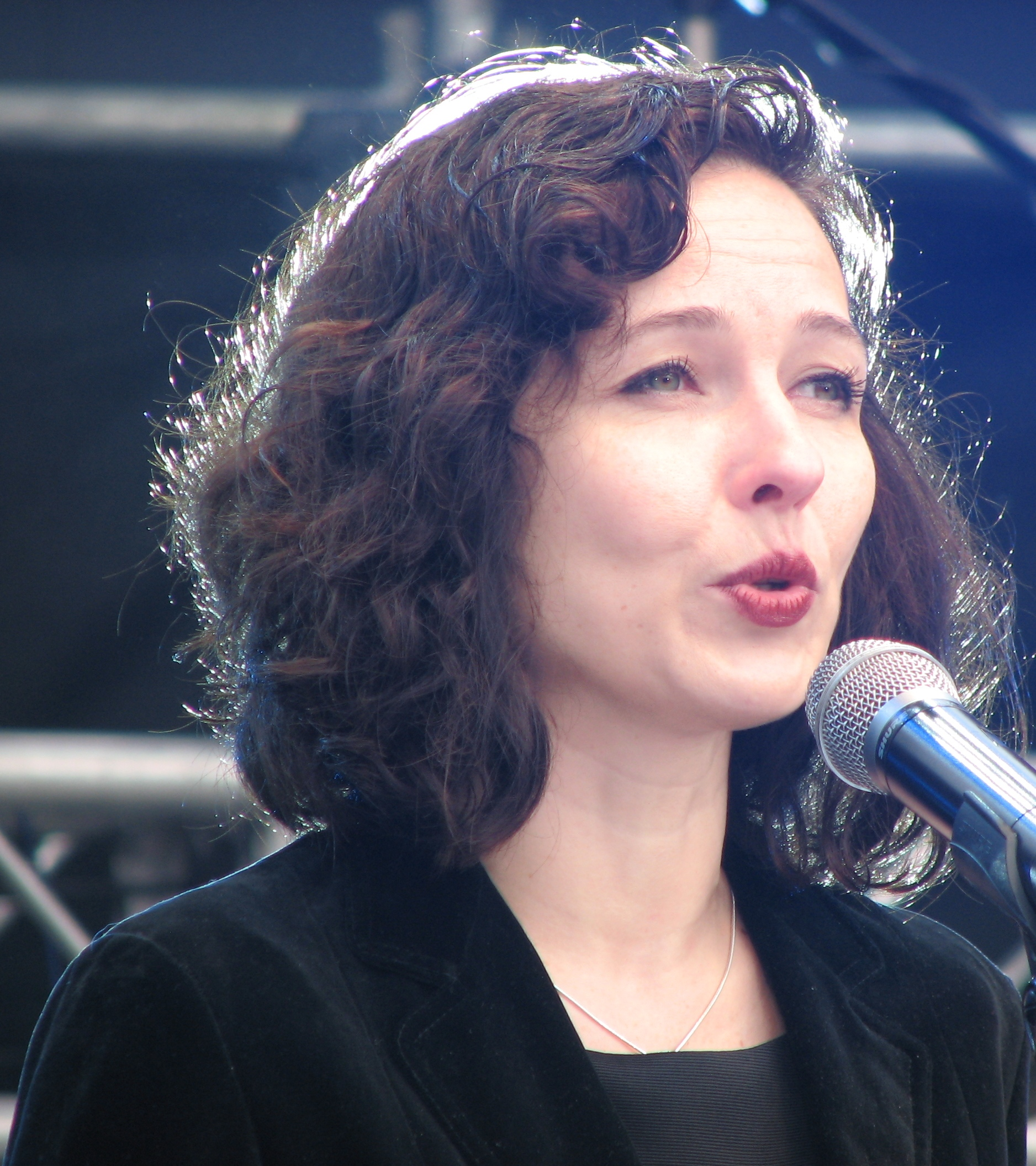
- Viiding in 2010
- Born: 20 March 1974 (age 52); Tallinn, Estonia
- Parent(s): Juhan Viiding, Riina Kiisk
- Writing career
- Pen name: Elo Vee

Elo Viiding (pen name Elo Vee; born 20 March 1974) is an Estonian poet and prose writer.

== Family ==
Elo Viiding was born in Tallinn on 20 March 1974. She is the third poet in her family. Her father, Juhan Viiding was a famous and influential poet in the 1970s. He was also an actor. Her paternal grandfather, Paul Viiding, was a poet, author and literary critic and member of Arbujad in the 1930s, and her paternal grandmother was translator Linda Viiding. Her maternal grandfather, Kaljo Kiisk, was an actor, film director and politician. Viiding's mother Riina was a music teacher.

== Education ==
Viiding, inspired by her father's career as an actor and her mother's love for music, graduated from school in 1999 as an actress. She studied violin.

== Literary career ==
Viiding debuted under a pseudonym ("Elo Vee") in 1991. She published four anthologies under her pseudonym. After her father's death in 1995, she began to publish her works under her real name.

== Themes and style ==
Viiding writes mainly about the oppressed. It is her opinion that every person is controlled and oppressed by someone else. She also uses her poetry to address what she sees as shortcomings in the Estonian educational system. She writes directly to her reader and her tone is extremely ironic. When her poetry is compared with that of other Estonian writers, it seems to be more masculine than feminine.

== Selected works ==
- collection of poetry "Telg" Kassett ´ 90 (publisher Eesti Raamat 1990),
- collection of poetry „Laeka lähedus" (publisher Tuum 1993),
- collection of poetry "Võlavalgel" (publisher Tuum 1995),
- collection of prose "Ingelheim" (publisher Eesti Raamat 1995),
- collection of poetry "V" (publisher Tuum 1998),
- selection of poetry in Finnish "Paljastuksia" (translated by Katja Meriluoto, publisher Nihil Interit 2000),
- „Kaardipakk" (poetry with Karl Martin Sinijärv, Jürgen Rooste, Triin Soomets, Asko Künnap, published by Näo Kirik 2001),
- collection of poetry "Esimene tahe" (publisher Tuum 2002),
- collection of poetry "Teatud erandid" (publisher Tuum 2003),
- selection of poetry in Swedish "För en stämma" (translator Peeter Puide, publisher Ariel 2004),
- collection of poetry "Selge jälg" (publisher Tuum 2005),
- „Kaardipakk Kaks" (poetry with Asko Künnap, Karl Martin Sinijärv, Jürgen Rooste, Triin Soomets, published by Näo Kirik 2006),
- collection of short stories "Püha Maama" (publisher Tuum 2008),
- collection of poetry "Meie paremas maailmas" (publisher Tuum 2009).

=== In anthologies ===
Prose: "Välismaa naised", ("Foreign women") "Best European Fiction 2010", Dalkey Archive Press, edited by Aleksandar Hemon, translated by Eric Dickens

Poetry: "Verden Finnes ikke på kartet" (Poesi fra hele verden), Forlaget Oktober AS, Oslo 2010, edited by Pedro Carmona-Alvarez and Gunnar Wærness. Translated by Turid Farbregd

Poems: "The Baltic Quintet: Poems from Estonia, Finland, Latvia, Lithuania and Sweden", edited by Edita Page, translated by Eric Dickens, Wolsak and Wynn Publishers Ltd. 2008

Poems: "New European poets" (edited by Wayne Miller and Kevin Prufer). St. Paul, Minn. : Graywolf Press, 2008, translated by Eric Dickens

Poems: "Viie tunni tee. Five Hours Away" – Poetry from Nordic Poetry Festival 2001 in English: Vahur Afanasjev, Kristiina Ehin, Mehis Heinsaar, Aapo Ilves, Jan Kaus, Marko Kompus, Kalju Kruusa, Asko Künnap, Fagira D. Morti, Veiko Märka, Aare Pilv, Juku-Kalle Raid, Jürgen Rooste, Olavi Ruitlane, Francois Serpent, Karl-Martin Sinijärv, Lauri Sommer, Elo Viiding, Wimberg. Edited by AcrossWords, translated by Tiina Laats, Acrosswords, 2001. 62 lk

Poems: "Ajattelen koko ajan rahaa" – Estonian contemporary poetry in Finnish: Jürgen Rooste, FS, Elo Viiding, Toomas Liiv, Aleksander Suuman, Kivisildnik, Kalev Keskküla, Asko Künnap, Kristiina Ehin, Triin Soomets, Mats Traat, Hasso Krull, Kalju Kruusa, Fagira D. Morti, Eeva Park, Karl Martin Sinijärv, Aare Pilv, Wimberg. Edited by Harri Rinne, translated by Anu Laitila

"Emadepäev" (Mothers' Day) in Swedish literary magazine "00-tal" (English edition), translated by Eric Dickens
