= Dead Mountaineer's Hotel (film) =

1979 film directed by Grigori Kromanov

- Soviet theatrical release poster
- Directed by: Grigori Kromanov
- Written by: Arkady and Boris Strugatsky
- Produced by: Veronika Bobossova; Raimund Felt
- Starring: Uldis Pūcītis; Jüri Järvet; Lembit Peterson; Mikk Mikiver; Kārlis Sebris; Irena Kriauzaitė
- Cinematography: Jüri Sillart
- Edited by: Sirje Haagel
- Music by: Sven Grünberg
- Production company: Tallinnfilm
- Release dates: 24 August 1979 (Estonia); 18 January 1980 (Moscow)
- Running time: 80 minutes
- Countries: Estonia; Soviet Union
- Language: Estonian

Dead Mountaineer's Hotel (Estonian: "Hukkunud Alpinisti" hotell, Russian: Отель "У погибшего альпиниста") is a 1979 Soviet era Estonian science fiction horror film directed by Grigori Kromanov and starring Uldis Pūcītis, Jüri Järvet, Lembit Peterson, Mikk Mikiver, Kārlis Sebris, and Irena Kriauzaitė. The film is based on the 1970 novel Dead Mountaineer's Hotel by Arkady and Boris Strugatsky, who also wrote the screenplay.

== Plot ==
Due to an anonymous call, Inspector Glebsky travels to the hotel "Dead Mountaineer's." This hotel is situated in a mountainous region of a secluded valley in a European nation. Simply put, the hotel's name, "Dead Mountaineer's," refers to the fact that a climber perished here after falling from a cliff. He left only his faithful dog behind – a St. Bernard called Lel. In the hotel there is a rather bleak portrait of the climber near which faithful Lel likes to sleep.

Almost all of the lodgers are rather strange, especially Mr. and Mrs. Moses and Olaf Andvarafors. Later another strange individual materializes; Luarvik, who can not even utter a couple of words. Mr. Moses and Luarvik turn out to be aliens and Mrs. Moses and Olaf are their robots, although they look like ordinary people. And in the mountains they suffer a calamity.

After a heavy snowfall, when the hotel is cut off from the outside world, a body appears at one point. Inspector Glebsky initiates an investigation, using all of his standard skills. However the investigation of the pseudo-murder of Olaf comes to a standstill. And when seemingly all intricacies of the plot unravel and the aliens can safely leave the Earth a military helicopter appears.

The inspector has a chance to do great service to the aliens, but Glebsky behaves like a typical cop, subordinate only to common sense and official instructions which leads to the tragic outcome.

At the end of the film the inspector is plagued by doubts whether he did everything he could.

== Cast ==
- Uldis Pūcītis as Inspector Peter Glebsky
- Jüri Järvet as Alex Snewahr
- Lembit Peterson as Simon Simonet
- Mikk Mikiver as Hinckus
- Kārlis Sebris as Mr. Moses
- Irena Kriauzaitė as Mrs. Moses
- Sulev Luik as Luarvik
- Tiit Härm as Olaf Andvarafors
- Nijolė Oželytė as Brun
- Kaarin Raid as Kaisa

== Production ==
The film was directed by Grigori Kromanov, with his wife Irena Veisaitė acting as assistant director while taking a sabbatical year from university. It was filmed between 1978 and 1979 in Kazakhstan, and set in a fictional western country. Lead actor Uldis Pūcītis, who did not speak Estonian, had his lines dubbed by Estonian actor and theatre teacher Aarne Üksküla.

== Release ==
A restored cut of the film was screened at the Berlin International Film Festival in February 2026.

=== Home media ===
Deaf Crocodile released a limited edition 4K UHD Blu-ray set on 31 March 2026.

== Reception ==
=== Analysis ===
Eva Näripea and Henriette Cederlöf, in a 2015 article on the film, viewed it as a blend of science fiction and film noir, the latter particularly in its visual aesthetics. They also viewed the film as "[touching] upon the inherent tensions and social anxieties of the 'crudely communist' Soviet regime" and "Soviet nationalism and the threat it poses to the language, culture and the very existence of non-Russian ethnic groups". Gender identity was also a theme that they identified in the film, commenting on its "apparent denial of heteronormativity as the sole accepted coordinate system for sexual identity", which "parallels its obvious denunciation of oppressive power relations and the attempts by Soviet authorities to combat all kinds of otherness, including of ideological and ethnic origin".

=== Accolades ===
Award/association	Year	Category	Recipient(s) and nominee(s)	Result	Ref.
Estonian SSR Film Festival	1980	Best Cinematography	Jüri Sillart	Won	
Estonian SSR Film Festival	1980	Best Art Design	Tõnu Virve	Won	
Estonian SSR Film Festival	1980	Jury Special Prize – Novel Expression in Film Music	Sven Grünberg	Won	
Trieste Science Fiction Festival	1980	Silver Asteroid Award	Dead Mountaineer's Hotel	Won	
USSR Film Competition, Shoskta	1979	Best Cinematography	Jüri Sillart	Won	

== Sources ==
- Pick, Anat; Narraway, Guinevere (2014). Screening Nature: Cinema Beyond the Human. New York City, New York: Berghan Books. ISBN 978-1-782-38227-0.
- Plasseraud, Yves (2015). Irena Veisaite: Tolerance and Involvement. Leiden, Netherlands: Brill/Rodopi. ISBN 978-9-004-29890-3.
