= Ingo Normet =

Estonian theatre director and pedagogue (1946–2022)

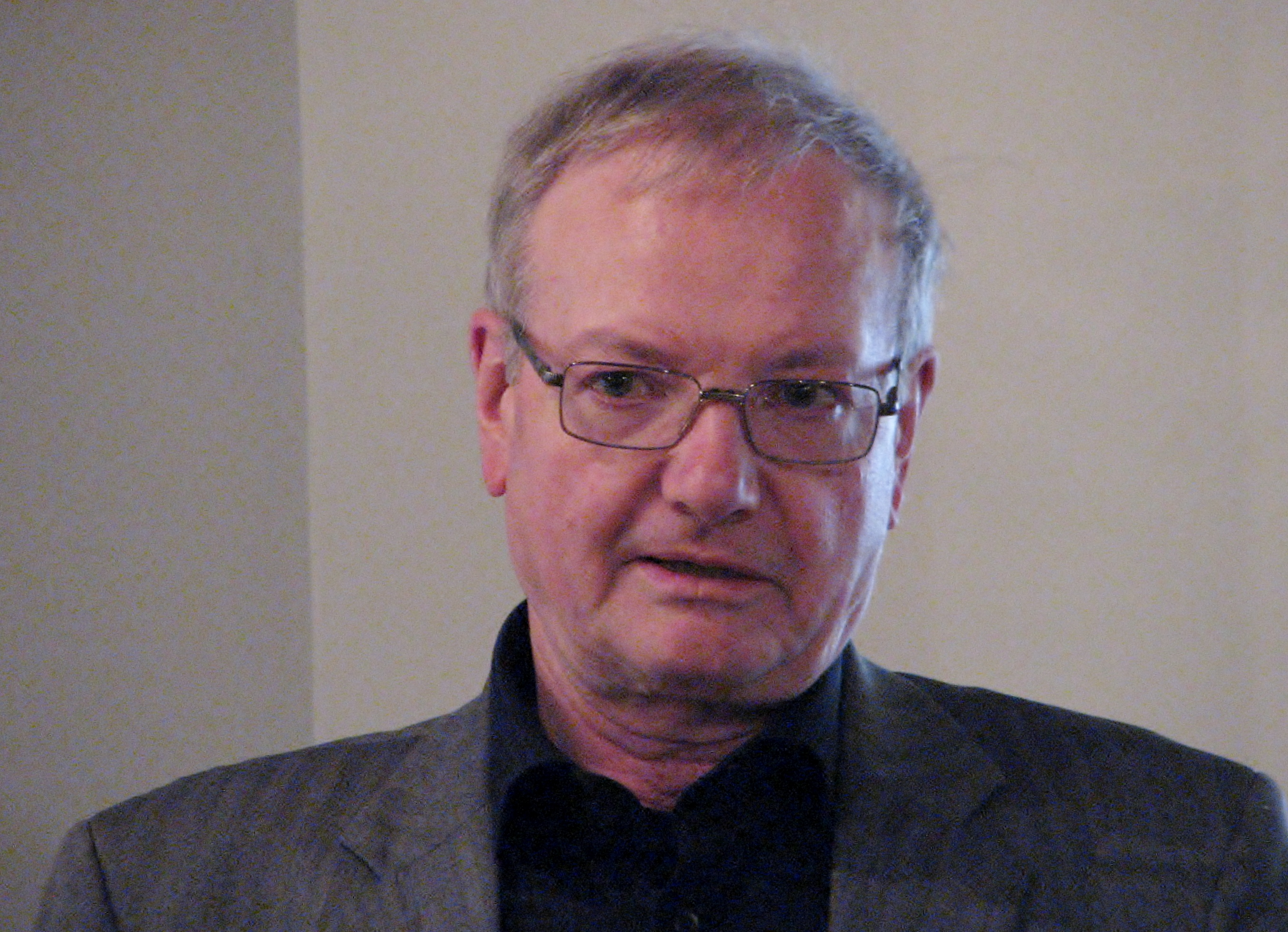
- Normet in 2014
- Born: 8 June 1946; Tallinn, then part of Estonian SSR, Soviet Union
- Died: 8 September 2022
- Occupations: Theatre director; theatre pedagogue
- Known for: Long-term work at Endla Theatre; leadership of the drama department (lavakunstikool) at the Estonian Academy of Music and Theatre
- Spouse(s): Kaarin Raid (m. 1967; div. 1973) Tiia Kriisa (m. 1974–2022)
- Parent(s): Leo Normet (father); Dagmar Normet (mother)
- Awards: Ants Lauter Award (1979); Order of the White Star (4th Class; 2001); Priit Põldroos theatre-thought prize (2002); Cultural Endowment of Estonia lifetime achievement award (2021)

Ingo Normet (8 June 1946 – 8 September 2022) was an Estonian theatre director and theatre pedagogue. He worked at the Endla Theatre in Pärnu from the late 1960s, serving as its chief director (peanäitejuht) in the 1980s and early 1990s. From the 1990s he became one of the central figures in Estonian theatre education, teaching at and later directing the drama department (lavakunstikool) of the Estonian Academy of Music and Theatre (EAMT). He also staged productions in Finland and is recorded in Finnish bibliographic and theatre-history sources as an Estonian director active in Finnish professional theatres.

== Early life and education ==
Ingo Normet was born in Tallinn. His parents were composer Leo Normet and writer and translator Dagmar Normet (née Rubinstein). His mother was Jewish. He graduated from Tallinn 10th Secondary School in 1964 and studied drama directing at GITIS in Moscow (graduating 1969), later undertaking advanced training in Leningrad (1981–1984).

== Career ==
=== Endla Theatre and television ===
Normet joined the Endla Theatre in 1969 and worked there as a director until 1982; he served as chief director from 1982 to 1991. The ETBL biography also notes work in film and television, including a period at Tallinnfilm in the 1970s and later leadership work connected to Estonian Television’s theatre productions (Teleteater) in the early 1990s.

=== Theatre pedagogy and EAMT drama department ===
From 1990 Normet taught at the Estonian Academy of Music and Theatre’s drama department (lavakunstikool) and from 1995 to 2011 led the school; he held a professorship from the mid-1990s and later became emeritus. In an obituary, the Estonian Theatre Union described him as one of the most influential figures shaping the drama school and, through it, the professional theatre field in Estonia over the last quarter-century.

Normet received the Priit Põldroos theatre-thought prize in 2002; the Theatre Union’s award citation explicitly linked the prize to his leadership of the EAMT drama school, the introduction of systematic directing education, and his pedagogical work.

=== Work in Finland and international activity ===
Normet directed productions in Finland and is mentioned in Finnish theatre-history scholarship in connection with Estonian participation and recognition in festival exchanges, including a directing prize for a production based on Maiju Lassila. A Finnish National Library bibliographic record indexes a 1995 review of Shakespeare’s Measure for Measure (Mitta mitasta) at Lappeenranta City Theatre credited to Normet as director. He is also credited as director (ohj.) of Saituri (The Miser) in a Finnish theatre’s published retrospective content.

== Works ==
Normet’s credited stage works span several decades and include productions in Estonian professional theatres and in teletheatre productions for Eesti Televisioon.

=== Selected stage productions ===
- An Enemy of the People (Doktor Stockmann) (after Henrik Ibsen) (1978)
- Measure for Measure (Mõõt mõõdu vastu) (after William Shakespeare) (1979)
- Waiting for Godot (Godot’d oodates) (after Samuel Beckett) (1996)
- The Miser (Ihnur) (after Molière) (1999)
- The Blue Bird (Sinilind) (after Maurice Maeterlinck) (2013)
- Brand (after Henrik Ibsen) (2014)
- Romeo vs. Julia (after Shakespeare; Sipari & Urpelainen) (2015)
- Dear Liar (Armas luiskaja) (after Jerome Kilty) (2019)

== Publications ==
Normet published a collection of his theatre-related articles and interviews (Teatrist, 2002) and a theatre-school handbook (Ujuda selles jões. Teatrikooli aabits, 2011). The ETBL biography also credits him with children’s plays and with editing/compiling theatre books and translations used in theatre education.

== Awards and honours ==
- Ants Lauter Award (1979).
- Merited Art Worker of the Estonian SSR (1986).
- Order of the White Star (4th Class; 2001).
- Priit Põldroos theatre-thought prize (2002).
- Cultural Endowment of Estonia (Performing Arts Foundation) lifetime achievement award (2021).

== Personal life ==
Inog Normet was married to theatre director Kaarin Raid (1967–1973) and later to actress Tiia Kriisa (from 1974).
