= Orden Satany =

Studio album by Korrozia Metalla
- Released: 1988 (original); 1991 (re-recording)
- Recorded: Summer 1988, Ostankino TV Studio (original); July–September 1991, Stas Namin Centre (re-recording)
- Genres: Thrash metal, speed metal
- Length: 41:50 (1988 original); 36:16 (1991 re-recording); 49:22 (2008 remaster)
- Labels: KTR; SNC Records (1991 re-recording)
- Producers: Sergei Troitsky, Stas Namin (1998 (produced original tape), 1991 (helped with re-recording))

Korrozia Metalla chronology
Orden Satany (1988)	Russian Vodka (1989)

Orden Satany (Russian: Орден Сатаны, [ˈordʲɪn sataˈnɨ], The Order of Satan) is the debut album by Korrozia Metalla. Originally released in 1988 as a self-published cassette, produced by Stas Namin. After that the album was professionally re-recorded with the assistance of Stas Namin and reissued in late 1991.

== History ==
Korrozia Metalla formed in 1984. The following year, they released a six-song cassingle titled "Vlast zla", which included a song called "Lucifer" as its lead-off track. "Lucifer" became a fixture in the group's setlists and would eventually be re-recorded for Orden Satany.

The original version of the album was recorded at a recording studio in Ostankino in the summer of 1988 over three nights. Melodiya, the Soviet state label, wouldn't release the album due to the Satanic themes in the lyrics, so bandleader Sergei Troitsky decided to release it on his own, selling it on cassette at concerts. These tapes would also be traded among fans.

In 1991, the group signed a record deal with SNC Records, who offered to release Orden Satany. The master tapes were lost, so between July and September, they re-recorded the album at Namin's studio. The band, however, still list 1988 as the release date for the album in all their discographies, even though it was given its first official release in 1991. On the 1991 version of the album, the track "Motorocker", recorded both in Russian and English, was included in its English form, "Wheels of Fire".

In 1994, Korrozia Metalla signed to Moroz Records, who reissued the album on CD the following year. "Motorocker" was included in its Russian version and an instrumental, "Sedmye vorota ada", recorded in November 1994 with a keyboard-based industrial trio called Block Four (which also made Nicht Kapituliren), was included at the end of the album.

In 2008, the album was remastered and reissued by the band's label KTR. Bonus tracks included an instrumental, "Marsh Drakuly" (an outtake from the 1991 sessions), the original version of "Lucifer" from the 1988 release as recorded at Ostankino, and four live videos.

In 2021, the original 1988 recordings were remastered and released on CD for the first time, with a bonus disc containing the Live in October live album.

== Track listing ==
No.	Title	Lyrics	Music	Transliterated (translated) title	Length
1.	"СПИД"	Sergei Troitsky	Sergei Troitsky, Sergei Vysokosov	SPID (AIDS)	4:01
2.	"Героин"	Troitsky	Vysokosov, Alexander Bondarenko, Vadim Mikhailov	Geroin (Heroin)	4:41
3.	"В шторме викинг и меч"	Vysokosov	Vysokosov, Troitsky	V shtorme viking i mech (Viking and Sword in the Storm)	4:18
4.	"Моторокер" (The original LP and CD releases on SNC Records had an English version of this song called "Wheels of Fire", originally from cassette album President (1990).)	Troitsky	Troitsky, Vysokosov	Motoroker (Motorocker)	3:03
5.	"Марш Дракулы" (instrumental; only included on 2008 remaster; was made in 1997 with Vysokosov and Troitsky and firstly released on Dancing Heaven & Hell (1998))		Troitsky, Vysokosov	Marsh Drakuly (The March of Dracula)	1:06
6.	"Чёрный террор"	Troitsky	Troitsky, Vysokosov	Cherny terror (Black Terror)	5:09
7.	"Фантом"	Troitsky	Troitsky	Fantom (Phantom)	5:50
8.	"Аббадон"	Troitsky	Troitsky	Abbadon	4:57
9.	"Люцифер" (pseudo-live effects are on this track; only included on official remasters from 1991)	Troitsky	Troitsky	Lyutsifer (Lucifer)	4:34
10.	"Седьмые ворота ада" (instrumental, recorded in November 1994, appears on all releases since the 1995 CD reissue on Moroz)		Vysokosov, Troitsky, Roman Lebedev, Block Four (mixed, keyboards)	Sedmye vorota ada (The Seventh Gates of Hell)	7:08
11.	"Люцифер" (original version from the 1988 tape release (but with editing), bonus track on 2008 remaster)	Troitsky	Troitsky		4:56

== Personnel ==
- Sergei Vysokosov - vocals, lead guitar
- Roman Lebedev - rhythm guitar
- Sergei Troitsky - bass
- Alexander Bondarenko - drums
- Konstantin Smirnov, Yuri Orlov, Oleg Salkhov - keyboards, mixed by (The Seventh Gates of Hell)
