= Kuidas kuningas kuu peale kippus =

2004 album by No-Big Silence and Kosmikud

Kuidas kuningas Kuu peale kippus

Studio album by No-Big-Silence and Kosmikud
- Released: 2004
- Recorded: 2003
- Genre: Industrial metal Folk rock Alternative metal
- Length: 21:18
- Label: NBS Recordings
- Producer: No-Big-Silence and Kosmikud

No-Big-Silence chronology
Procreate the Petrifactions 2004 (2004)	Kuidas kuningas Kuu peale kippus (2004)	War in Wonderland (2006)

Kosmikud chronology
Kuidas tuli pimedus... (2003)	Kuidas kuningas Kuu peale kippus (2004)	Pulmad ja matused (2006)

Kuidas kuningas Kuu peale kippus (How the King Wanted to Go to the Moon) is an album released in 2004 by No-Big-Silence and Kosmikud.

The singles are "Kuninga imekanad", "Sepa kahurikuul" and "Tisleri kastitorn". The album is based on the 1976 TV musical Kuidas kuningas kuu peale kippus by Peeter Volkonski and Dagmar Normet. The original arrangement was done by the Estonian rock band Ruja (1971–1988).

== Track listing ==
1. "Kuninga imekanad" ("King's Wonder-chicken") – 2:31
2. "Vapper major annab au" ("Brave Major Salutes") – 1:25
3. "Tisleri imelind" ("Joiner's Wonderbird") – 3:52
4. "Sepa kahurikuul" ("Blacksmith's Cannonball") – 2:13
5. "Koka laul" ("Chef's Song") – 3:26
6. "Tisleri kastitorn" ("Joiner's Tower of Boxes") – 2:18
7. "Ehitame torni" ("We're Building a Tower") – 1:55
8. "Ei jaksa me" ("We Haven't Got the Strength") – 2:19
9. "Hei pinguta ja rassi" ("Hey Strive and Toil") – 13:18
- The real length of "Hei pinguta ja rassi" is 2:14 and is followed by 7:55 of silence before a small clip of the band doing a recording session comes in at 9:29 which lasts for 3:50.

== Personnel ==
=== No-Big-Silence ===
- Cram – vocals (tracks 1, 2, 3, 4, 7, 8, 9)
- Kristo K – guitar (3); backing vocals (8); keyboards
- Willem – acoustic guitar (1, 3, 5, 7); backing vocals (8)
- Kristo R – drums; backing vocals (8)

=== Kosmikud ===
- Hainz - vocals (5, 8, 9)
- Aleksander Vana - guitar
- Kõmmari - bass

=== Others ===
- Peeter Volkonski - vocals (6, 7, 9)
- Hele Kõre - vocals (1, 5, 7, 8)
- Peeter Malkov - flute (3)
- DJ Sinda - DJing (4)

== Notes ==
- No-Big-Silence & Kosmikud featuring Peeter Volkonski and Hele Kõre.
- Music by Peeter Volkonski, lyrics by Dagmar Normet, arranged by No-Big-Silence and Kosmikud.
- Recorded at No-Big-Silence Studios winter 2003/2004.
- Mastered by Kristo Kotkas.
- Drawings by Aivar Juhanson, photos by Viktor Koshkin, design by Cram.
