= Kosmikud =

Estonian musical group

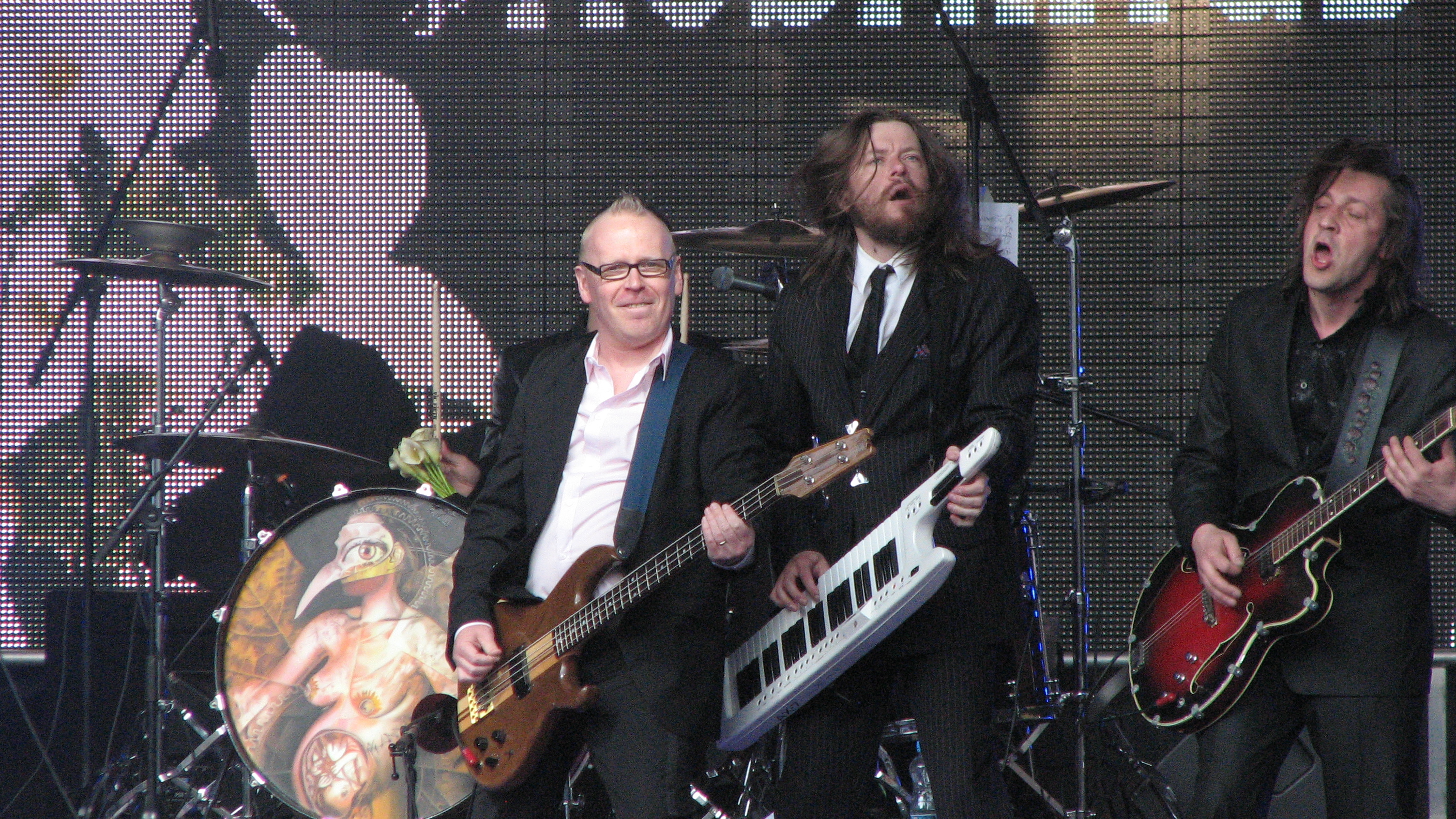
Kosmikud performing in 2012

Kosmikud are an Estonian alternative rock group founded in 1999. They released their first album Ei roosid in 2000, after their singer Taavi Pedriks died. The remaining three members of the band – Aleksander Vana (guitar), Kristo Rajasaare (drums) and Raivo Rätte (a.k.a. Kõmmari, bass) – decided to take a time out, rehearse and try new singers. They finally chose Meelis Hainsoo (Hainz), violinist in Eriti Kurva Muusika Ansambel ('Ensemble of Especially Sad Music') and also a friend of their previous singer.

Their second album Kuidas tuli pimedus... ('How Darkness Came...'), which was released in 2003, includes songs that talk about love, death, depression, etc. Their biggest influences have been Joy Division, Nick Cave, and Кино.

In 2004 they did an album with Estonian industrial metal band No-Big-Silence called Kuidas kuningas kuu peale kippus. In 2006 they released Pulmad ja matused ('Weddings and Funerals') and in 2008 Ainus, mis jääb, on beat ('Only Beat Endures').

On 18 July 2018, Raivo Rätte was killed when he was hit by a car apparently driven by his former wife's new partner. Criminal investigation is ongoing.

Kosmikud has a new bassist Lauri "Uims" Leis, who has been a household name in Estonian punk scene for years and played for example in Vennaskond.

== Line-up ==
=== Original line-up (1999–2000) ===
- Taavi Pedriks (1971–2000) – vocals
- Andres alias Aleksander Vana – guitar
- Raivo "Kõmmari" Rätte – bass (died 18 July 2018)
- Kristo Rajasaare – drums

=== Second line-up (2001–present) ===
- Meelis "Hainz" Hainsoo – vocals
- Andres alias Aleksander Vana – guitar
- Raivo "Kõmmari" Rätte – bass (died 18 July 2018)
- Kristo Rajasaare – drums

== Discography ==
- Ei roosid (2000)
- Kuidas tuli pimedus... (2003)
- Kuidas kuningas kuu peale kippus (2004), with No-Big-Silence
- Pulmad ja matused (2006)
- Ainus, mis jääb, on beat (2008)
- Öö ei lase magada (2011)
- Sügis sanatooriumis (2017)
