= Suurte Masinate Muusika =

2007 album by No-Big-Silence

Video by No-Big-Silence and Tiit Kikas
- Released: August 17, 2007
- Recorded: Leigo Lake Music Festival 2005, Estonia
- Genre: Industrial metal Electro-Industrial
- Length: 1:16:49
- Label: NBS Recordings
- Producer: No-Big-Silence

No-Big-Silence and Tiit Kikas chronology
Suurte Masinate Muusika	...

Suurte Masinate Muusika (The Music of Big Machines) is a live DVD by No-Big-Silence and Tiit Kikas of their concert at Leigo Järvemuusika in 2005.

Although it was released when the band and Tiit Kikas performed the Suurte Sõjamasinate Muusika (The Music of Big War Machines) concert at the same place on 17 August 2007, the footage on the DVD is of the 2005 concert. The main difference between the two concerts was that the 2007 performance contained a lot of songs from War in Wonderland, images of war were used prominently and military vehicles (e.g. troop carriers and an aircraft) moved around during the concert; whereas in 2005 there was an industrial theme with images of industrial machines and industry vehicles (e.g. tractors) moving around.

On the inside of the DVD case it says: Tuli + Vesi + Elektroonika + Masinad ("Fire + Water + Electronica + Machines").

== Track listing ==
1. "Intro"
2. "On the Hunt"
3. "Vapper major annab au" ("Brave major is saluting")
4. "Reaction"
5. "Sepa kahurikuul" ("Blacksmith's cannonball")
6. "Blowjob"
7. "Vamp-o-Drama"
8. "Relief"
9. "New Race"
10. "Outro"

The DVD also contains footage of stage crew setting up the concert and the band doing sound check, named "Day Before", and a photo gallery of the concert and the setting up of the concert.

== Personnel ==
- Cram (Marek Piliste) — lead vocals
- Willem (Villem Tarvas) — bass guitar, backing vocals
- Kristo Kotkas — keyboard, guitar, programming
- Kristo Rajasaare — drums
- Tiit Kikas — keyboard, fiddle, programming
