= Starstealer =

2009 album by No-Big-Silence

Studio album by No-Big-Silence
- Released: June 2009
- Recorded: Sinusoid Studio (December 2008- April 2009)
- Genre: Industrial metal
- Length: 43:06
- Label: NBS Recordings
- Producer: No-Big-Silence

No-Big-Silence chronology
War in Wonderland (2006)	Starstealer (2009)

Starstealer is an album released in 2009 by an Estonian industrial metal band No-Big-Silence.

The first single is "Chain Me".

== Track listing ==
Lyrics written by Cram; music written by Willem.

1. "Chain Me" – 4:18
2. "Starstealer" – 4:46
3. "505 Signs of Chaos" – 4:24
4. "Kiss the Beast" – 4:50
5. "Plastic Cabaret" – 3:45
6. "Radioactive Paradise" – 3:34
7. "The Bone Man" – 4:25
8. "Flashback" – 4:02
9. "Neuropathic Pain Control" – 4:19
10. "Cut the Cord" – 5:07

== Personnel ==
- Vocals - Cram
- Bass, backing vocals, guitar - Willem
- Guitar, mandolin, keyboards and programming - Kristo Kotkas
- Drums - Rainer Mere
- Editing, mixing - Kristo Kotkas
- Producing - No-Big-Silence
- Mastering - Kristo Kotkas
- Additional vocals and voices - Kaire Vilgats, Iiris, Vicky OS X, Sethh
- Artwork - Taavi Oolberg
- Layout - Taavi Oolberg and Cram
- Photos - Veiko Kallas, Erik Riikoja
