= Kaarin Raid =

Estonian director, theatre pedagogue, and actor

Kaarin Raid (22 October 1942 Rakvere – 29 July 2014 Viljandi) was an Estonian director, theatre pedagogue and actor.

In 1967 she graduated from GITIS in director speciality. 1967–1974 she was a director at Endla Theatre, 1974–1977 at Estonian Youth Theatre, 1977–1983 at Vanemuine Theatre, and 1983–1995 and 2000–2005 at Ugala Theatre. 1994–2001 he taught at Viljandi Culture Academy. Besides theatre roles she has played also in several films.

== Filmography ==
- 1978: Imelugu (musical television film; in the role: Abbess)
- 1979: Hukkunud Alpinisti hotell (feature film; in the role: Kaisa)
- 1986: Saja aasta pärast mais (feature film; in the role: Telman's mother)
- 1989: Äratus (feature film; in the role: Rural woman)
- 1995: Nadja - Heimkehr in die Fremde (television film)
