= Sergei Troitskiy =

Russian footballer

Personal information
- Full name: Sergei Gennadyevich Troitskiy
- Date of birth: 14 February 1961 (age 65)
- Place of birth: Bryansk, Russian SFSR
- Height: 1.80 m (5 ft 11 in)
- Position: Defender

Youth career
- FC Dynamo Bryansk

Senior career*
Years	Team	Apps	(Gls)
1979–1985	FC Dynamo Bryansk	170	(10)
1986	FC Torpedo Moscow	12	(0)
1987–1991	FC Dynamo Bryansk	171	(8)
1992	FC Kuban Krasnodar	15	(0)
1992	FC Niva Slavyansk-na-Kubani	1	(0)
1992–1996	FC Kremin Kremenchuk	100	(1)
1996–1997	FC Spartak Bryansk	48	(5)
1998	FC Dynamo Bryansk	27	(0)

Managerial career
- 2000–2003: FC Dynamo-D Bryansk
- * Club domestic league appearances and goals

Sergei Gennadyevich Troitskiy (Russian: Серге́й Геннадьевич Троицкий; born 14 February 1961) is a former Russian professional footballer.

== Club career ==
He made his professional debut in the Soviet Second League in 1981 for FC Dynamo Bryansk.

== Honours ==
- Soviet Cup winner: 1986.
