= Dagmar Normet =

Estonian writer (1921–2008)

Dagmar Normet (born Dagmar-Sarlia Rubinstein; 13 February 1921 – 16 October 2008 Tallinn) was an Estonian literary author and translator.

== Biography ==
Dagmar Normet was born Dagmar-Sarlia Rubinstein on 13 February 1921, in Tallinn into a Jewish family. From 1940 till 1945, her name was Dagmar Randa.

Normet studied in Ulyanovsk in the Soviet Union at the Pedagogical Institute, and in Moscow at the Moscow Institute of Physical Education. In 1945, Normet returned to Tartu in Estonia to teach sport at the Tartu State University. From 1945–1960, Dagmar was married to the Estonian composer Leo Normet, with whom she had a son Ingo Normet and a daughter Haldi.

== Selected works ==
- "Maalesõit" (1948)
- "Me ehitame maja" (1957)
- "Vöödiline hobune" (Play 1968)
- "Lo Tui" (Essay; 1973)
- "Delfiinia" (1975)
- "Suur saladus" (Radio drama; 1977)
- "Une-Mati, Päris-Mati ja Tups" (1979)
- "Kümme ust" (1985)
- "Une-Mati rannakülas" (1986)
- "Ernst Idla – võlur Tallinnast" (1991)
- "Naeratuste vikerkaar" (1992)
- "Lõvi ja lohe" (1993)
- "Avanevad uksed" (2001)
- "... ainult võti taskus" (2004)

Translation

- Mira Lobe "Vanaema õunapuu otsas" (1973)
- Mira Lobe "Hiir kipub välja" (1984)
