= Yves Plasseraud =

French-born doctor of law in intellectual property (born 1939)

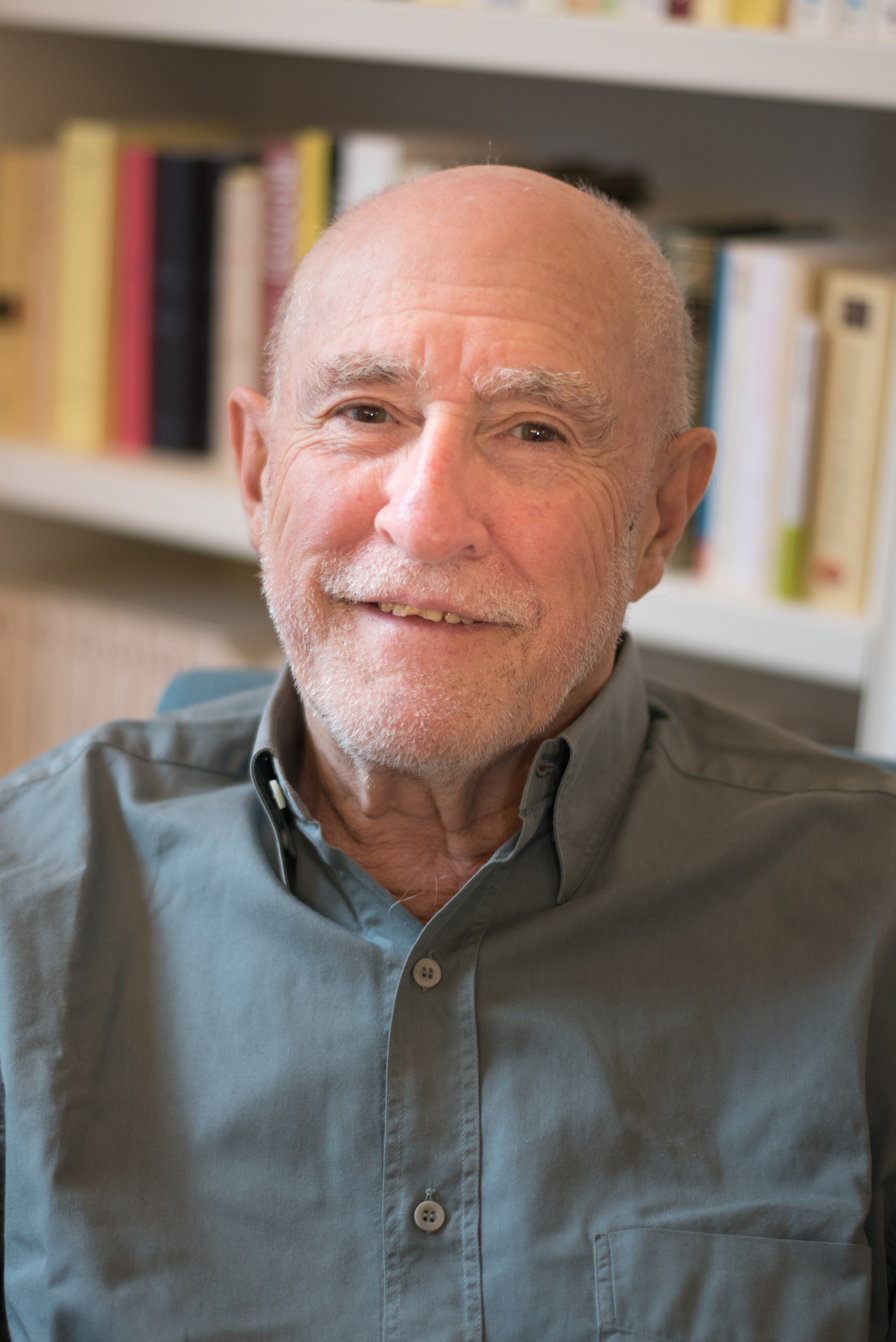
- Born: June 24, 1939 (age 87); Boulogne-Billancourt, France
- Education: Graduated from the Paris Institute of Political Studies (Sciences Po Paris, 1965) after which he continued his education at the Center for International Intellectual Property Studies (CEIPI) at the University of Strasbourg (1968), where he received Ph.D. in Intellectual Property Law in 1970.
- Known for: Intellectual Property, particularly Trademarks, Designs & Models and Geographical Indications. Expert in Ethnic, linguistic and cultural minorities and their protection. Expert on the Baltic States and their minorities.
- Partner: Suzanne Pourchier-Plasseraud
- Children: 3
- Parent(s): René Plasseraud, Marie-Gabrielle Mézergue
- Honours: Order of the Lithuanian Grand Duke Gediminas 5° "Knight's Cross" Ordre de la Libération Order of the Cross of Terra Mariana

Yves Plasseraud (born June 24, 1939) is a French-born doctor of law in intellectual property, a researcher and lecturer and a minority rights advocate. He is notably a founder and long-time president of ‘Groupement pour les Droits des minorités' (Grouping for the Rights of Minorities), author or editor of numerous books and publications. He is also an expert on Eastern Europe, specifically the Baltic States.

== Early life and background ==
=== Graduate studies ===
Plasseraud's thesis, "La protection des inventions en URSS et dans les républiques populaires d’Europe" (The Protection of Inventions in the USSR and the Popular Republics of Europe), was the first study in French on the protection of inventions in Eastern countries. It was amended and published by Litec in collaboration with Martine Hiance in 1969. A second work titled 'Brevets et sous-développement. La protection des inventions dans les pays du tiers monde' (Patents and Underdevelopment: The Protection of Inventions in Third World Countries), also co-authored with Martine Hiance, was published by Litec in 1972.

=== Personal life ===
Plasseraud is married to Suzanne Pourchier-Plasseraud with whom he co-authored several books and articles.

== Intellectual property ==
=== Legal career ===
After returning from Strasbourg in 1966, Plasseraud worked for Cabinet Plasseraud, becoming a partner in 1974.

In 1984, Plasseraud left Cabinet Plasseraud and co-founded the firm Ernest Gutmann-Yves Plasseraud (EGYP) with Ernest Gutmann, son of Rodolphe Gutmann. During these years, Yves was active in a number of professional associations.

Throughout his professional years, Plasseraud published several works focusing on topics such as the origins of patent law (in collaboration with François Savignon), as well as trademark law and geographical indications.

During many years, Yves was a member of the group of experts who drafted the modern law on Patents for developing countries. He was later a member of another group who drafted the European Trademarks convention.

In 1995, Plasseraud left EGYP to concentrate on his research and writing and devote time to the field of minorities protection.

In 2018, returning to the field of intellectual property, he co-authored a book titled ‘Typicité : valorisation du patrimoine’ with his daughter which presents several decades of experience in how regions enhance the recognition of terroirs and their products.

== Minority rights ==
In 1996 Plasseraud together with a small group of activists, including Gérard Chaliand (writer), Alain Fenet (professor of law), and Olivier Mongin (philosopher and journalist), launched the Groupement pour les Droits des Minorités (GDM), following the pattern of the British Minority Rights Group (MRG).

After having acted as Secretary General for some years, Plasseraud became the president of the GDM.

GDM was responsible for organizing numerous conferences on minority themes. The proceedings were published, either through Parisian publishers or by GDM self-publishing. GDM was represented at various drafting meetings of the Council of Europe and European Community as well as that of the European charter for regional and minority languages. Plasseraud also lectured at the Paris International College of Defense (CID) on minorities and geopolitics.

Extraterritorial cultural autonomy is a field that Yves Plasseraud has researched and written papers on. This concept relates to the protection of the rights of individuals regardless of the territory where they live. It has seen many successful applications in history, from the Ottoman millet court to the Hungarian Law of 1993.

=== Baltic States ===
Another area of enduring interest for Plasseraud is the future and the status of the Baltic States and their minorities. After writing various articles on this topic, Plasseraud published his first book about it in 1989. He subsequently wrote close to ten books on this subject. He especially researched the Jews of the Baltic region, particularly the Litvaks of former Lithuania, and published several works in collaboration with Henri Minczeles. Plasseraud was also directly involved in the process of investigating the Holocaust in the Baltic States and particularly in Lithuania through conferences and interviews. He was also invited to participate in meetings concerning the integration of the Russian speaking communities in the Estonian and Latvian societies.

Yves Plasseraud was the president of Association France-Estonie in 1991-1995. He was also instrumental, together with Suzanne Champonnois, in founding the Association France-Lettonie in 1996.

In 2015, Plasseraud published Irena Versaité: Tolerance and Involvement, a biography of his long-standing friend Irena Veisaite, a Holocaust survivor and outstanding cultural and human rights activist in Vilnius

For his service to the Baltic countries, Plasseraud was awarded:

- Order of the Lithuanian Grand Duke Gediminas 5° "Knight's Cross" (Lithuania, 1996)
- January 13th commemorative medal (Lithuania, 1993.01.11)
- Order of the Cross of Terra Mariana (Estonia)

Devoting himself to promoting awareness and advocating for the rights of ethnic, cultural, and religious minorities, he made numerous interventions and wrote or edited about ten books on these topics, including Atlas Européen des minorités (European Atlas of Minorities) published by Autrement (2005).

Since 2000 Plasseraud has been a member of the Association for the Study of Nationalities (ASN), attending the yearly conventions in Columbia University in New York, delivering lectures and chairing roundtables.

== Bibliography (non-exhaustive) ==
=== Intellectual property ===
==== Personal works and books written in collaboration ====
- La protection des inventions en URSS et dans les républiques populaires d'Europe , with M. Hiance, Litec, 1969.
- Brevets et sous-développement, la protection des inventions dans les pays du tiers monde, with M. Hiance, Litec, 1972.
- Choisir, protéger et gérer vos marques, Editions d’Organisation, 1977.
- Genèse du droit unioniste des brevets, in collaboration with F. Savignon, Litec, 1983.
- L'État et l'invention, histoire des brevets Yves Plasseraud, F. Savignon, Paris, 1883, La Documentation Française, 1986.
- Entreprise et propriété industrielle, Cabinet Plasseraud, Europrotection, 1983.
- Le nouveau droit chinois des brevets d'invention, with C. Grosset-Fournier, EGYP, 1987.
- Les Marques, with M. Dehaut & C. Plasseraud, Francis Lefebvre 1994.
- Les AOC with Martine Dehaut, EGYP.
- Typicité, La valorisation du patrimoine, in collaboration with Marie-Gabrielle Plasseraud, TIR, Rennes, 2018.

==== Collective works ====
- European Patent Law and Practice, (M. Stiefel & J. Gevers), Practising Law Institute, New York, 1970.
- Piraterie et contrefaçon de marques dans les pays du Marché commun, Paris, EGYP, 1985.
- De Dienstmerken, Les marques de service, RDC-TBH, Bruxelles, 1987
- Die Neuregelung des gewerblichen Rechtschutzes in China, GRUR Abhandlungen, Munich, 1988.
- Interfaces between Trademarks, Geographical Indications and Designations of Origin in Europe, ECTA, Crète, May 24–27, 2000.
- Les instruments juridiques reconnus par l’OMC: IGP, marques collectives, certifications, labels, in Les ressources génétiques végétales et le droit dans les rapports Nord-Sud, Bruylant, 2004.

==== Articles ====
- “Droit communautaire des ententes”, Bulletin de la Compagnie des Conseils en propriété industrielle (CBI).
- "La nouvelle loi française sur les brevets", Rassegna della proprietà Industriale Litteraria Artistica (RPILA), N° 14- December–January, 1967.
- “Le commerce Est-Ouest et la propriété industrielle”, RPILA, Milan, 1968.
- “La marque de spécialité pharmaceutique”, CBI Informations, N°11 March 1975
- “La recherche d’antériorités en matière de marques”, CBI Informations, n° 15, 3° trimester 1976.
- “Marques et langues régionales”, Revue de propriété Industrielle, Litttéraire et Artistique (RIPIA), ca. 1976.
- “Droit communautaire des ententes”, Bulletin de la Compagnie des Conseils en propriété industrielle (CBI).
- “La marque de fabrique, de commerce ou de service dans l’industrie pharmaceutique”, Bulletin de l’Ordre des pharmaciens N° 278, October - November 1984.
- “Ancré dans le terroir français… le système des appellations d’origine”, Le Monde diplomatique, April 1988.
- “La lucrative industrie de la contrefaçon”, Le Monde diplomatique, April 1988.
- “La déclaration française des droits de l’homme et sa filiation. La protection des inventions" (décrets de January et May 1791), Droits d’auteurs et droits de l’homme, INPI, 16 et 17 June 1989.
- "Intellectual Property Enforcement Practices in the Judiciary, Customs and Police". OMC/OMPI/OSIM, Mangalia (Ro), June 6–8, 2001.

=== Works on the subject of minorities and identity ===
==== Personal works and books written in collaboration ====
- Une et (in)divisible, Nature et Bretagne, 1980.
- Ethnisme et extrême- droite, Celsius, special issue, February 1987.
- Histoire de France, mythes et réalités, (with S. Citron & C. Guyonvarc'h), Analyse Laïque,1995.
- Les minorités, Clés, Montchrétien, 1998.
- L'identité, Clés, Montchrétien, 2000.
- Atlas des minorités des États d’Europe, (ed.), Autrement, 2005.
- L’Europe et ses minorités, PUG, Grenoble, 2012.
- Les identités des peuples d’Europe, Armeline, 2016.
- Идентичность народов Европы, L’identité des peuples d’Europe, Moscow, 2019.
- Identity and Sustainable Development. Promoting Cities and States in the Global Market, Riga 14–15 November 2002.

==== Collective works ====
- Qu’est-ce qu’une minorité en France aujourd’hui? Les minorités l'âge de l'État-nation, Fayard, 1985.
- Les revendications des minorités autochtones de France métropolitaine deux siècles après 1789, Les minorités et leurs droits depuis 1789, L'Harmattan,1989.
- Nouvelle Europe: minorités et réfugiés, GDM, 1993.
- Les minorités et leur protection, Encyclopedia Universalis, 1997.
- Nouvelle Europe et minorités, in: Questions contemporaines de minorités: Diversité culturelle, fédéralisme et prévention des conflits, Conférence OSCE, 2006 sur la mise en œuvre des engagements concernant la dimension humaine (Warsaw 2–12 October 2006), CGRI, Bruxelles, 2007. (with an English version).
- Tallinn Conference on Conceptualizing Integration (October 18–19 - 2007), Integration Foundation, Tallinn, 2008.
- “Typologie des minorités ethniques, culturelles et religieuses”, in Bretons, Indiens, Kabyles … Des minorités nationales?, Rennes, PUR, 2009.
- Les minorités ethniques et linguistiques en Europe, Rencontres européennes, Actes de la Fondation Joseph Karolyi, Budapest, 2012.
- Les langues de France et la ratification de la charte des langues régionales ou minoritaires, Klein, Pierre, Initiative citoyenne alsacienne. Strasbourg, 2013.
- Yves Person un historien de l’Afrique engagé dans son temps, ed. Becker, Charles, & al, IMAF-Karthala, Paris, 2015.
- Panarchy, Political theory of non-territorial states, Tucker, Aviezer, de Bellis, Gian Piero de Bellis (eds.) Routledge, 2015.
- Minorités et mondialisation, ed. Le Coadic, Ronan, BCD, Rennes, 2016.
- Panarchia, Un paradigma per la società multiculturale, ed. De Bellis G-P, FSC, Ladispoli (RM), 2017.
- Svoi i tchoujnie. Metamorfosi identitnosti na vostoke i zapade Evropi, (Soi-même et les autres, la métamorphose des identités à l’Est et à l’Ouest de l’Europe), ed. Filippova, Elena & al, Académie des sciences de Russie, Goriatchaia linaia (Hotline) – Telekom, Moscow, 2018.
- В Амелин, Les nôtres et les autres. Retour épistémologique sur la perception des identités en Europe, Elena Filippova, Yann Bévant, Yves Plasseraud, Sergey Sokolovskiy 2019.
- Peuples en lutte, ed. Blanchard, J-F, Choplin, R. LE Coadic, R., TIR, 2021.
- Région, Régionalisation, Régionalisme, ed. Klein, Pierre, ID Éditions, Strasbourg, 2022.
- “Le nationalisme et son double”, Le Peuple breton, November 1996.
- “Les minorités en Europe médiane: tensions et conflits potentiels”, La Nouvelle Alternative, N° 43, September 1996.
- “La résistible émergence du «peuple corse»”, Le Monde, 6 April 2000. (with H. Giordan, B. Étienne, S. Citron, C. Guyonvarc'h, R. Lafont)
- “Minorités et nouvelle Europe^{”}, Courrier des pays de l’Est, N° 1052, November - December 2005.

==== Articles ====
- “Do Ethnic Minorities exist in France in 1984?”, Razprave in Gradivo, December 1984, page 53-61.
- “Ali v letu 1984 v Franciji obsajajo manjsine?”, Razprave in Gradivo, 12, 1984.
- “Le bilinguisme dans l’enseignement en France: le cas des langues régionales”, Razprave in Gradivo (Treatises and Documents), N° 18, March 1986.
- “L’identité”, Article 31, August 1986.
- “Éveils minoritaires et luttes d’émancipation nationales: essai de typologie”, Études polémologiques, N°43, March 1987.
- “Pourquoi l’identité? Pourquoi les luttes culturelles?”, Le Peuple Breton, July/August 1987.
- “Identité : Yves Plasseraud répond”, Le Peuple breton, December 1987.
- “Les identités culturelles contre le racisme”, Celsius, December 1987.
- “Droit à la différence ou société métisse?”, Celsius, January 1988.
- “Lumières et ombres de l’identité ethnique”, Razprave in gradivo (Treaties and Documents), St.21, December 1988.
- “Un peuple moral”, Land un Sproch, December 1988.
- “Moldavie soviétique et conscience identitaire roumaine”, Celsius, July–August 1989.
- “Moldavie soviétique et conscience identitaire roumaine”, Le Peuple Breton, January 1990.
- “Le nationalisme albanais”, Le Peuple Breton, June 1990.
- “Indépendantisme, autonomisme, le terrorisme régional est minoritaire”, (Interview d’Antoine Fouchet), La Croix, June 11, 1990.
- “Minorités nationales, nationalisme et racisme en Europe de l’Est”, MRAX – Information (Bruxelles), N° 59, June 1990.
- “Pour ou contre l’identité ? Identitarisme, nationalisme et exclusion”, Peuple Breton, July - August 1992.
- “Minorités et régions”, Les enjeux de l’Europe, N° 9, Autumn 1992.
- “Les minorités ethniques ou nationales en Europe centrale et orientale; handicap ou richesse?”, Diagonales Est - Ouest, N°9, April 1993.
- “La conscience d’être différent”, Courrier de l’UNESCO, June 1993.
- “Les minorités, enjeu géopolitique”, Le Peuple Breton, January 1994.
- “Le retour du nationalisme ethnique”, Ar Falz, N° 82–83, 1994.
- “Rencontre, Militant des droits des minorités”, La lettre de la rue Saint Guillaume, 57, November 1993.
- “L’autonomie culturelle personnelle et les minorités nationales dispersées”, Le Peuple breton, November 1997.
- “Les minorités en Ukraine”, La Nouvelle Alternative, September 1999,
- “L’histoire oubliée de l’autonomie culturelle”, Le Monde diplomatique, May 2000.
- “Le révisionnisme breton …Encore un mot …”, Diasporiques, November 2000.
- “États - nations et minorités en Europe”, Plurielles, Les Juifs et l’Europe, N°9, 2001.
- “Un jour avec …Yves Plasseraud, «défenseur des minorités», Le Peuple breton, May 2004.
- “Plus on est à l’aise dans son identité, plus on est accueillant envers les autres”, La Croix, May 28, 2004.
- "Minorités et Nouvelle Europe", Le Courrier des pays de l’Est, 2005/6 (n° 1052)
- “Les minorités nationales en Pologne, 1918-1945”, F. Bafoil (Dir. ) La Pologne, Fayard-Ceri, Paris, 2007.
- "Protection des minorités et autonomie culturelle" in Nations et territoires : Quelles institutions ?, Confluences méditerranéennes, Vol. 73, Spring 2010.
- “«Old» and «new» Minorities: The pro and contra of Similar Treatment, an Inclusion unaffordable? The uncertain fate of integration Policies in Europe”, Providus, Riga, 2010.
- “National minorities/ New minorities. What similarities and differences in contemporary Europe?^{”}, Sens public, 2010.
- “Minorités et autonomie culturelle”, La Bretagne au monde, Hopala, N°44, 2014.
- “Ukraine-Russie : Une instrumentalisation des minorités”, Médiapart, 17 March 2014.
- “Réforme territoriale: promouvoir des régions charnelles”, with H. Giordan, Mediapart, 24 September 2014.
- “Les Setos”, Le Peuple breton, 2016.
- “Région et régionalisme: La longue histoire du régionalisme français, le régionalisme alsacien”, Elsass (published online), N° 2, January 2017.
- "Wokisme et minorités, le grand paradoxe", Esprit, March 2026.

Podcasts

- La question des minorités en Europe, Radio France: France Culture, October 27, 2014.
- Europe: les Métamorphoses (2/4) - Union divisée cherche modèle de gouvernance, Radio France: France Culture, November 4, 2014.
- Indépendance catalane : le dilemme européen, Radio France: France Culture, Octobre 6, 2017.

=== Works on the Baltic States ===
==== Personal works and books written in collaboration ====
- Les pays baltes, Preface by Marc Ferro, GDM, 1989.
- Les pays baltes, (2nd Edition), GDM, 1990.
- Pays baltes, with F. Moulonguet, Autrement, 1991.
- Les États baltes, Clés, Montchrétien, 1992.
- L’année 1993 est encore difficile pour les pays scandinaves et les pays baltes, Grand Larousse annuel, 1993.
- Sympozjum w wilnie o szesciu wiekach obecnosci zydow na Litwie, Dni Pamieci, (with Suzanne Pourchier-Plasseraud), 1993.
- La Lituanie juive: 1918-1940 messages d'un monde englouti, with H. Minczeles, Autrement,1996.
- Les États baltes (2° Edition), Clés, Montchrétien, 1996.
- Carnets baltes, 1980-1999, Lituanica, Strasbourg, 1999.
- Les capitales baltes, with Suzanne Pourchier-Plasseraud, Autrement Collection Guides, 1999.
- Lietuvos Zydai, 1918-1940, Prarasto pasaulio aidas, ALK/Baltos Lankos, Vilnius. 2000.
- Les États baltiques. Les sociétés gigognes, Armeline, Crozon, 2003.
- Carnets baltes 1980-2004, Lituanica, Strasbourg, 2004.
- Les États baltiques, des sociétés gigognes, Armeline, 2nd ed., Crozon, 2006.
- Mazumos. Tautiniu it etniniu mazumu studiju ivadas, Apostrofa, Vilnius, 2006.
- La Lituanie juive: 1918-1940 messages d’un monde englouti, with Henri Minczeles, Autrement, 2006 (2nd ed.).
- Les Litvaks: L'héritage universel d'un monde juif disparu, with Henri Minczeles et Suzanne Pourchier, La Découverte, 2008.
- Histoire de la Lituanie, un millénaire (Ed.), Crozon, Armeline, 2009.
- Irena Veisaite: Tolerance and involvement, in: On the Boundary of Two Worlds, Brill, Volume: 40, 2015
- Les Germano-baltes, (with Suzanne Pourchier) Armeline, 2022.

==== Collective works ====
- L’année 1993 est encore difficile pour les pays scandinaves et les pays baltes, Grand Larousse Annuel, 1993.
- The Days of Memory, Baltos Lankos, Vilnius, 1995
- Riga, la cohabitation de sociétés rivales. Villes baltiques. Une mémoire partagée, CNRS Éditions, 11/2010.
- Lituanie, j’écris ton nom, L’Harmattan, 2013.
- Estonie, Lettonie, Lituanie 1918-2018, Groupe interparlementaire d’amitié France-Pays Baltes, Actes du colloque 2018, N° GA 152, July 2018.
- Lituanie, j’écris ton nom, L’Harmattan, 2020.

==== Articles ====
- “Sur la bonne voie …”, Le Peuple breton, December 1988.
- “Carnets baltes”, with Suzanne Pourchier-Plasseraud, Esprit, February 1989.
- “Qu’en est-il des pays baltes?”, Le Peuple breton, March 1989.
- “Ce qui se passe dans les pays baltes”, Le Peuple Breton, April 1989.
- “La conférence du mouvement d’indépendance pour la Lettonie (LNNK), 21–23 August 1989”, Nouvelles baltes, N°7, September 1989.
- “Plein cadre, Yves Plasseraud et les pays baltes”, La liberté du Morbihan, October 23, 1989.
- “La renaissance des pays baltes, un sujet de réflexion pour le mouvement breton”, (interview), Ouest-France, October 26, 1989.
- “Retour à Riga'" with Suzanne Pourchier, Esprit, November 1989.
- “Lituanie. Coup de bélier dans l’empire éclaté”, Geo – Magazine, January 1990.
- “Vers l’indépendance des pays baltes”, with S. Pourchier, Esprit, March – April 1990.
- “La fédération des pays baltes est indispensable”, L’autre journal, May 1990.
- “Towards independence for the Baltic States?”, Esprit, with S. Pourchier 1990, Vol.160, p. 33-39.
- “Vers l'indépendance des pays baltes?”, Esprit, 1990 (160 (3/4).
- “Francuzis par Baltijas valstim”, Briva Latvija, Interview par Rolands Lappuke's interview, N° 36, October 1990.
- "La rota de l’independencia?" Occitans, July – August 1990.
- “Post mortem – Juifs et Baltes“, Esprit, February 1991.
- “La question balte”, Cahiers pour croire aujourd’hui, 15 April 1991.
- “Les pays baltes: enfin l’indépendance! (Independence finally comes to the Baltic States) (with S. Pourchier), Esprit, October 1991.
- Estonie, Lettonie, Lituanie: une indépendance glauque (with Suzanne Pourchier), Esprit, October 1992.
- Vilnius: retour au communisme? (with S. Pourchier), Esprit, June 1993.
- “États baltes, trois ans après l’indépendance”, Diagonales Est - Ouest, Décembre 1994- January 1995.
- “Les États baltes: Quatrième année d’indépendance retrouvée”, Le Peuple breton, July/August 1995.
- “Reikia esverti, galeros metu, kai zmones nezino kur iriasi”, Lietuvos Rytas, 1995, rugpjucio 5 d.
- “Construire sur du sable : Les États baltes en 1995”, (with S. Pourchier), Esprit, January – February 1996.
- “Les Juifs des pays baltes depuis 1980”, in Juifs d'Europe Centrale et Orientale 1945–1996, N° 3, Yod, 1996–1997.
- “Le rôle des langues nationales dans l’affirmation identitaire des peuples baltes”, Langues et pouvoirs, de l’Afrique du Nord à l’Extrême-Orient, Edisud, Paris, 1998.
- “Les États baltes vers l’Europe", (Baltic states: moving towards Europe) (with S. Pourchier), Esprit, January 1999.
- “Pays baltes. Huit ans de liberté”, L’Europe centrale et orientale; dix ans de transformations (1989-1999)", CEDUCEE, La Documentation française, 1999.
- “The Baltic States and the French Public Opinion since the Return to Independence”, Mosklo darbai, mokloslotyra, 3, 1999.
- “Dix ans de transition baltes”, Regards sur l’Est, January/February 2000.
- “Estonie 1999-2000. Une avancée à pas de géant”, Le courrier des pays de l’Est, June–July 2000.
- "Réussir la sortie du communisme. L’exemple balte", with S. Pourchier, Les cahiers lituaniens, Série documents, September 12, 2001.
- “Réussir la sortie du communisme. L’exemple balte", Esprit, February 2002.
- “Lituanie 2003 : Retour au multiculturalisme”, Diasporiques, N°25, March 2003.
- "Yves`as Plasseraud. Nejaučiame atsakomybės už laisvę", Bernardinai, interview by Loic Salphaty, 2003.
- “Pays baltiques : questions de citoyenneté?”, La Nouvelle Alternative, Winter 2003–2004.
- Interview dans le périodique informatique letton: Neirozes Iabak neslept, Politika. Lv: 14-05-04.
- “Pays baltes : rêves, propagandes, malentendus", Intellectuels, médias et médiations autour de la Baltique, Questions de communication, N°6, 2004.
- “La Lettonie : Principal ennemi de la Russie”, Nordiques, N°7, Spring/Summer 2005.
- “Pravilnim poutem idietié”, Tchass, (Riga), November 25, 2005.
- "Caucase du Sud, États baltes: derrière la géopolitique, une histoire". Caucaz, Europenews, March 28, 2006.
- “L’Estonie et le monde nordique”, Nordiques, N° 11, Autumn 2006.
- “France-Lituanie 1918-2004: Sympathies réelles et occasions manquées”, Cahiers lituaniens, N°9, Autumn 2008.
- “Ar Paryzius atras Vilniu?”, Interview, Atgimimas, 27 birzelio 2008.
- “Lituanie : imaginaire politique et vie politique”, Regards Sur l’Est (RSE), 01-03-2008
- “Vilna/Wilno/Vilnius ou le palimpseste retrouvé”, Multiculturalité urbaine en Europe Centrale, villes moyennes et bourgades. Cultures d’Europe Centrale, N°7, 2008.
- “Riga: La cohabitation de sociétés rivales", in Villes baltiques, Une mémoire partagée. Revue germanique internationale, CNRS, Paris, 2010.
- “Assiste-on aujourd’hui à une renaissance juive en Lituanie?”, RSE, 01/07/2011.
- “Révisionnisme lituanien”, Diasporiques, N° 11, September 2011, p. 79.
- “Pologne-Lituanie: Un surprenant regain de tensions”, RSE Géopolitique (published online) 02-02-2011.
- “Lithuania and the Memory of the Shoah” (Holocaust), Vilnews, 2011.
- “Riga, une capitale”, RSE, N. 65.
- “Le russe, langue officielle en Lettonie?” Regard sur l’Est, 15-01-2014.
- “Les pays baltiques, européens d’abord?”, Esprit, Vol.Mai (5) 2021.
- “La guerre en Ukraine vue depuis les pays baltiques^{”}, Esprit, Vol.September (9) 2022.
- “À plusieurs voix: la guerre en Ukraine vue depuis les pays baltiques", Esprit, September 2022.
- “Les États baltiques”, Esprit, 2022
- "Comment se situent les Etats baltiques au sujet de la guerre russe en Ukraine et par rapport àl’Occident ?", Diploweb, June 11, 2023.

==== Podcasts ====
- "Les Litvaks : l'héritage universel d'un monde juif disparu", Radio France: France Culture, Mars 31, 2019.
- Guerre en Ukraine : comment protéger les pays baltes ?, Radio France: France Culture, June 27, 2022.
- Tête-à-tête avec Yves Plasseraud, Institut français Lituanie, 2022.
- Les États baltes, Nouvel Esprit Public, July 9, 2023.

=== Various other works ===
==== Personal works and books written in collaboration ====
- Bureaucraties chinoises, Études chinoises, dir. R.Lew et F.Thierry, 1987.
- Les nouvelles démocraties d'Europe centrale: Hongrie, Pologne, Tchécoslovaquie, Bulgarie, Roumanie, Clés, Montchrétien, 1991
- Et merde pour le Roi d’Angleterre, stéréotypes xénophobes en Europe, with Philippe Hamon, preface Yves Meny, PUR, 2023.

==== Collective works ====
- Bureaucraties chinoises, Asie - Débat, L’Harmattan, February 1987.
- Les masques du racisme, Recueil, Le Monde diplomatique, October 1990.
- Dictionnaire constitutionnel (O. Duhamel, Y. Meny), Article Pologne, 1991.
- Russie: la décentralisation aux prises avec l'étatisme, La Documentation Française, 1994
- Les extrémismes en Europe, Centre Européen de Recherche et d’Action sur le Racisme et l‘Antisémtisme (CERA), L’aube, Paris, 1996, 1997, 1998.
- Dialogue among Civilisations, The International Conference in Vilnius, Lithuania 23-26 April 2001, UNESCO, Paris, 2002.
- Penser les frontières de l’Europe du XIX° au XXI° siècle. Élargissement et union : approches historiques. dir. Gilles Pécout, PUF, 2004.

==== Articles ====
- "Rapport du Centre de Recherches, d’Information et de documentation sur la Démocratie et l’Autonomie (CRIDA)," 1995, 1996, 1997, 1998.
- “La Nouvelle droite fait son chemin"^{,} Esprit, July 1983.
- “Droite intellectuelle (Nouvelle droite), droite politique et Extrême - Droite : des points communs”, Article 31, November 1984.
- “Controverse”, Esprit, Plasseraud, Yves; et al., 1984 (88 (4)), p. 179-182
- “Décadence et barbarie”, Article 31, March 1985.
- “Décadence et barbarie (2nd part)”, Article 31, July 1985.
- “Le R.P.R: Un bien étrange libéralisme”, Article 31, June 1985.
- “Écrits sur Le Pen (E. Roussel, A. Rollat): Book Review”, Esprit, October Vol.9 (7), p.10, 1985.
- “Ambiguïtés idéologiques”, Article 31, October 1985.
- “1985: Une convergence G.R.E.C.E – M.N.R?”, Article 31, February 1986.
- “L’ésotérisme n’est pas (seulement) ce que l’on pense”, Article 31, May 1986.
- “Alain de Benoist «Europe – tiers – monde, même combat”, Article 31, September 1986.
- “Le mythe du guerrier - extrême droite et chose militaire”, Celsius, 12, 1986.
- “Où est passée la nouvelle droite? Immersion subversive”, Le droit de vivre, June - July 1987.
- “URSS: Les nouvelles droites grand – russe”, Celsius, October 1987.
- “Ombres et lumières du néo-cosmopolitisme”, Celsius, February 1988.
- “Progrès des droites russes”, Celsius, March 1989.
- “Le retour du pendule : l’extrême droite en Europe de l’Est” (interview), Celsius, Janvier 1990.
- “A l’Est, après un si long déficit démocratique”, Le monde diplomatique, June 1990.
- “Le retour vers l’Europe, Russie: la décentralisation aux prises avec l’étatisme”, Ex-URSS, La documentation française, édition 1994.
- “Un itinéraire combattant, Afrique, Asie, Amérique latine. 30 ans d'expérience de terrain^{”}, Esprit, 1998, Vol.241 (241 (3/4)), p.289-289
- “La démographie, ce facteur si souvent oublié : l’immigration, dernier recours face au vieillissement”, Atlantico, December 14, 2012.
- “Le Tourisme mémoriel en Europe centrale et orientale, Esprit, coll. « Usages de la mémoire »”, Review by Yves Plasseraud, 2014 (vol. 408 (10), p.146-148
- “Comprendre la géopolitique ukrainienne”, Le Peuple Breton, April 2014.
- “Visus darbus atlieku tik jausdamas didele simpatija Lietuvai”, Bernardianai 13/02/2014
- “Contre le populisme, le nationalisme revisité”, Elsass Journal, N° 6, May 2017.
- "Du centre et de la périphérie. Au carrefour d'italophonie et francophonie, Aracne, coll. « L'Essere di linguaggi » by Giovanni Agresti, Henri Giordan, Review by Yves Plasseraud", Esprit, No. 438, October 2017.
- “Jei kam idomu, esu pasirengusi papasakoti savo istorija, Irena Veisaite”, Literatura ir Menas, N°14 2017.
- “Europe, pourquoi partir ou rester?”, Elsass Journal, Numéro 10, Novembre 2017.
- “Le risque de prolifération étatique en Europe”, Diasporiques, N°40, January 2018.
- "Où est passé l'idéal tiers-mondiste", Le Peuple Breton, September 2024.
- "La Géorgie à l’ombre russe", Le Peuple breton, Novembre 2024.
