= Sven Grünberg =

Estonian composer (born 1956)

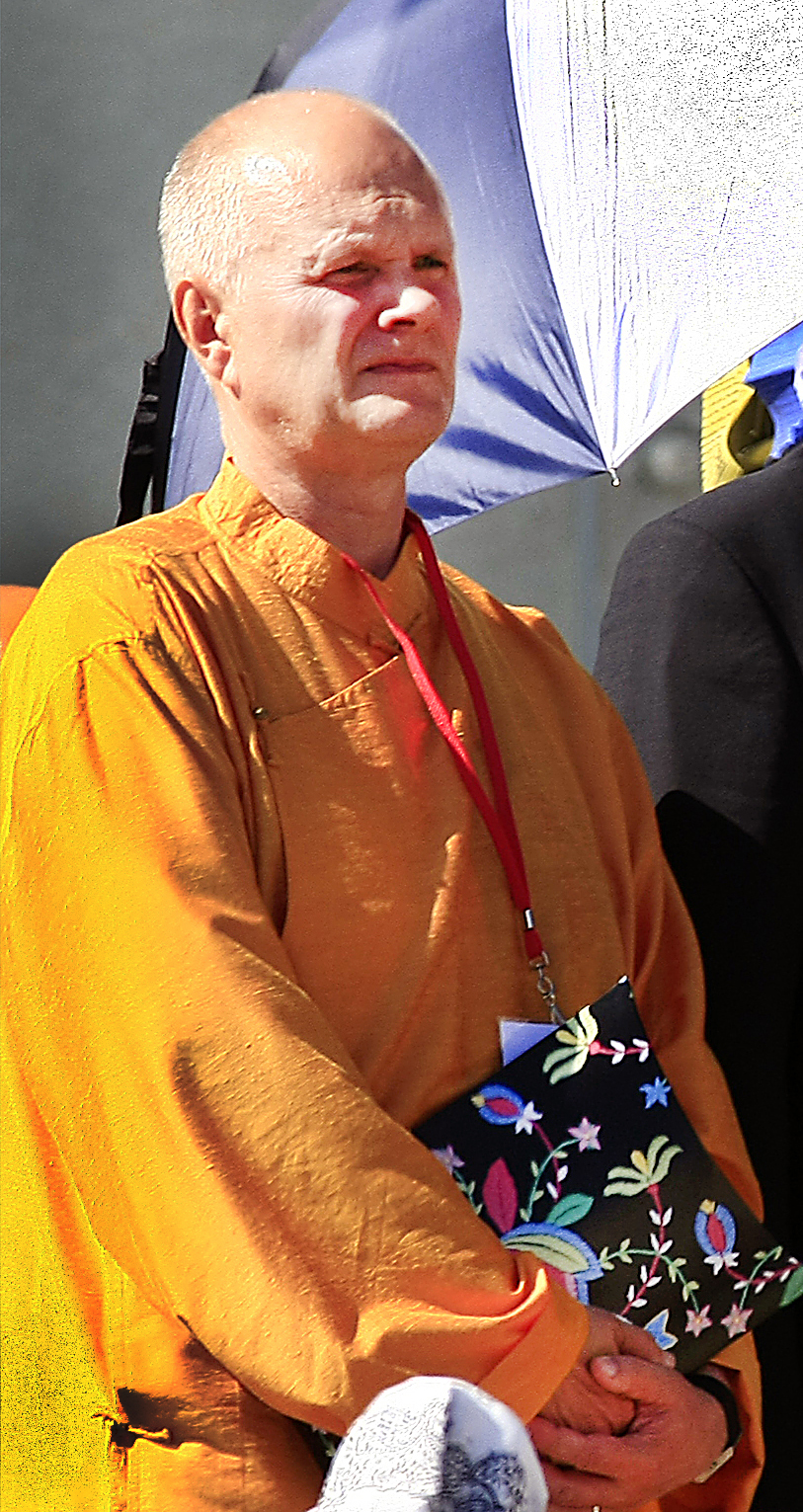
Sven Grünberg (2011)

Sven Grünberg (born 24 November 1956, Tallinn) is an Estonian synthesizer and progressive rock composer and musician best known for his meditative organ and electronic works involving the concepts of Tibetan Buddhism. He has collaborated with the film director Olav Neuland and written the soundtracks for the most of his films.

In the 1970s Grünberg was the leader of the progressive rock band Mess, which was founded by him in January 1974 together with Härmo Härm.

Grünberg is also the Chairman of the Board of the Estonian Institute of Buddhism.

== Albums ==
- Mess (1980)
- Hingus (1981)
- OM (1988)
- Milarepa (1993)
- Prana Symphony (1995)
- Hukkunud Alpinisti Hotell (2001)

== Mess Albums ==
- Mess (1996)
- Küsi eneselt (2004)
