= Korrozia Metalla =

Controversial Russian thrash metal band

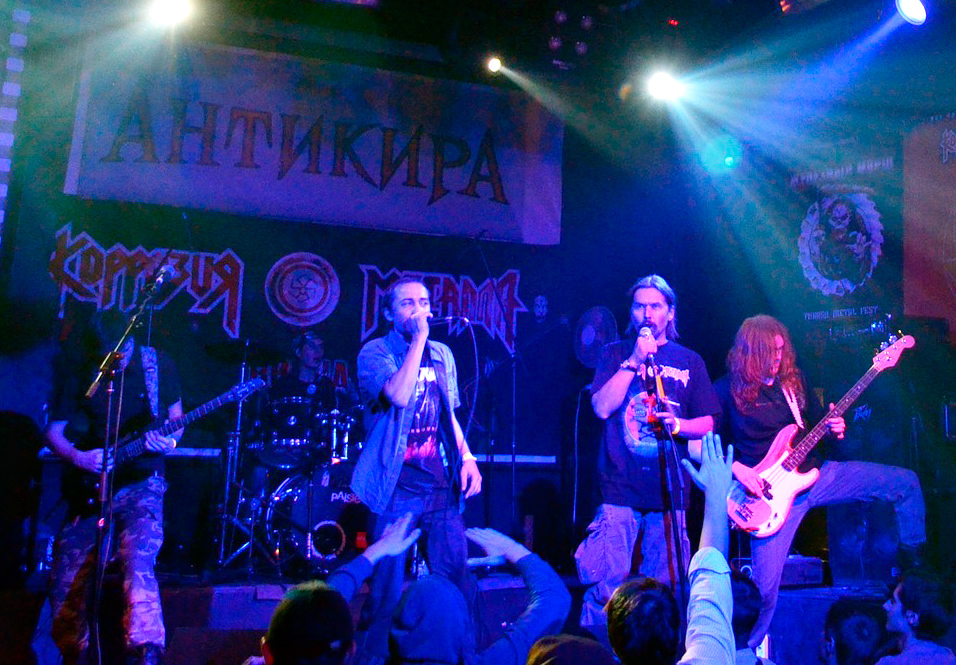
- Korrozia Metalla performing live in 2011

Background information
- Origin: Moscow, Soviet Union (now Russia)
- Genres: Thrash metal
- Years active: 1984–present
- Labels: KTR, SNC, RiTonis, Moroz
- Members: Sergey "Spider" Troitsky; Dmitry Ginkul; Alexander "Stalin"; Vladislav Tsarkov; Alexandra Karaseva; Alexander Skvortsov
- Past members: Sergey "Boar" Vysokosov; Roman "Crutch" Lebedev; Alexander "Lizard" Bondarenko; Andrey Shatunovsky; Max "Python" Trefan; Alexander Solomatin; Vasily "Mole" Kasurov; Konstantin "Kostya" Lepatov; Maxim "Max with Screw-Bolt" Layko
- Website: http://www.korroziametalla.ru

Korrozia Metalla (Коррозия Металла, [kɐˈrozʲɪjə mʲɪˈtalə], Russian for "Corrosion of metal",) is a Russian (formerly Soviet) thrash metal band led by Sergey "Pauk" Troitsky. It is best known for provocative public performances.

== Biography ==
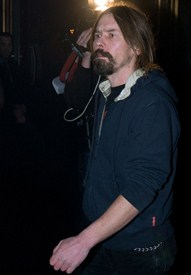
Sergey "Pauk" Troitsky, the band's leader and bassist

Korrozia Metalla was founded in 1984 in Moscow by bass guitarist and vocalist Sergey Troitsky. The band's first live show was illegally carried out in an apartment house basement. Annoyed by their noise, the neighbours called the police, which forced Korrozia to leave the stage. Next year the band joined the Moscow Rock Laboratory, which allowed the band to perform rock music legally. The band's first album, Orden Satany (Order of the Satan) was released in 1988. No Soviet state label was ready to release that kind of music, so Pauk created his own label, Hard Rock Corporation (HRC, Korporatsia Tyazhologo Roka, KTR, or КТР in Cyrillic). Before the album was recorded, Schizophrenic was fired and Boar performed vocals as well as guitar. Morgue was replaced by Yasher (Lizard).

In late Soviet years, censorship was lifted, and Korrozia Metalla became notorious for lyrics and imagery that, although consistent with western shock rock traditions, were quite provocative by Soviet Russia's measures. For their live shows, they employed strippers to dance on stage and decorated it with pyrotechnics and "satanic" imagery. Similarly, the band's lyrics consisted of black humour and strong language, describing violence, the supernatural, and sex.

In the 1990s, Pauk eventually fired the band's original line-up and both Korrozia Metalla's lyrics and live performances changed to a feigned affinity with fascism and neo-Nazism. During the promotional tour for the 1997 album "Computer Hitler", the band employed impersonators of dictators and political figures for their concerts. Pauk indicated his interest in politics when he nominated himself for mayor of Moscow in 1993, and for mayor of Khimki in 2012. The band has long been a spoof of far-right politics; several of their songs have been banned in Russia and they are included in Russia's Federal List of Extremist Materials for inciting inter-ethnic hatred.

The band's song Russian Vodka was covered by Koldbrann and Aggressor.

At the beginning of 2016, due to the local law, Korrozia Metalla's discography was removed from iTunes and Google Play Music.

On 3 September 2016, Troitsky was arrested in Montenegro after the house he was staying at burned down. He was facing a sentence of 5 years in prison, however Troitsky was sentenced to 10 months, of which he served 6.

On 28 April 2017, Troitsky returned to Russia and performed with Korrozia at the Mona Club, at a special concert called "Rock Against NATO".

On 29 April 2024 the band members were arrested during a live show in Nizhny Novgorod for displaying neo-Nazi symbols and selling neo-Nazi books and clothes, which is illegal in Russia. The band claimed, however, that they merely used "old Slavic symbols".

== Discography ==
=== Studio albums ===
- 1985 — Власть Зла (Демо), Vlast Zla (The Power of Evil, Demo)
- 1988 — Фантом, Phantom (Phantom)
- 1988 — Орден Сатаны, Orden Satany (Order of Satan, 1988/1991)
- 1989 — Russian Vodka (Russian Vodka, 1989/1993)
- 1990 — President (President, cassette demo of Cannibal)
- 1990 — Каннибал, Kannibal (Cannibal, 1990–1991)
- 1992 — Садизм, Sadizm (Sadism)
- 1995 — 1.966, 1,966 (1966)
- 1997 — Компьютер-Гитлер, Kompyuter-Gitler (Computer-Hitler)
- 1997 — Задержите поезд, Zaderzhite Poyezd (Delay the Train)
- 1998 — Антихрист (сольный альбом Паука), Antixrist (Antichrist, solo album Pauk)
- 2001 — Camoгoн, Samogon (Moonshine)
- 2001 — Бей чертей, Bey Chertey (Bay Devils)
- 2002 — Языческие боги, Yazycheskie Bogi (Pagan Gods)
- 2003 — чад Кутежа, Chad Kutezha (Children of Spree)
- 2004 — Белые волки, Belye Volki (White Wolves)
- 2005 — Одинокие сердца, Odinokiye Serdtsa (Lonely Heart, solo album Pauk)
- 2010 — Война миров, Voina mirov (War of the Worlds)
- 2011 — Огненный коловрат, Ognenni Kolovrat (Fiery Kolovrat)
- 2013 — 666 Like (666 Like)
- 2018 — Богиня морга, Boginya Morga (Goddess of the Morgue)

The first six albums were initially circulated on cassette tape and reel-to-reel among fans and sold at concerts. The band lost the master tapes and eventually wound up re-recording both albums, releasing them in 1991 and 1993 respectively. Kannibal was released on vinyl in 1991 by Sintez Records.

=== Live albums ===
- Жизнь в Октябре (Life in October, 1987 [recorded 1987])
- Дебош в Орлёнке (Party Hard in Orlenok, 1996 [recorded 1990])
- Live in Sexton FOZD Nightclub & Officers' Culture House. (1995, included in Nicht Kapituliren maxi-single [recorded 1993–1995])
- Адский концерт (Hellish Concert, 1997)
- Угар в Полярном (Party Hard in Polyarny, 1998, included Niger)
- Съешь живьём (Eat in the Flesh, 2005)

=== Singles ===
- "Vlast zla" (The Power of Evil, 1985)
- "Nicht Kapituliren" (Don't Give Up, 1995, included Live in Sexton FOZD Nightclub & Officers' Culture House [recorded 1995])
- "Задержите поезд" (Stop the Train, 1996)
- "Человек со шрамом" (Man with Scar, 1998)
- "Нигер" (Niger, 1998, included Party Hard in Polyarny)
- "Он не любил учителей" (He Didn't Like the Teachers, 1999)
- "Глаза вампира" (The Eyes of the Vampire, 2002)

A demo tape called "Vii" (Вий) from 1982 is also rumoured to exist.

== Literature ==
- Michael Moynihan, Didrik Söderlind: Lords of Chaos: Satanischer Metal: Der blutige Aufstieg aus dem Untergrund. Index Verlag, 2004, ISBN 978-3-936878-00-4, S. 343.
